= Athletics at the 1987 Mediterranean Games =

1987 Athletics at the Mediterranean Games

- Dates: 19–24 September
- Host city: (Syria) Latakia
- Venue: Al-Assad Stadium
- Events: 23 + 16
- Participation: 18 nations

Athletics at the 1987 Mediterranean Games were held in Latakia, Syria from 19 to 24 September.

== Medal table ==
Rank	Nation	Gold	Silver	Bronze	Total
1	Italy	17	10	8	35
2	Morocco	6	4	2	12
3	Yugoslavia	5	9	1	15
4	France	4	5	8	17
5	Greece	2	3	5	10
5	Spain	2	3	5	10
7	Algeria	1	1	3	5
8	Tunisia	1	0	1	2
9	Cyprus	1	0	0	1
10	Turkey	0	2	1	3
11	Albania	0	1	2	3
11	Egypt	0	1	2	3
13	Syria*	0	0	2	2
Totals (13 entries)		39	39	40	118

== Results ==
=== Men's events ===
Event	Gold		Silver		Bronze	
100 metres (wind: 0.0 m/s)	Stefano Tilli (ITA)	10.41	Ezio Madonia (ITA)	10.52	Mustapha Kamel Selmi (ALG)	10.56
200 metres (wind: +2.2 m/s)	Stefano Tilli (ITA)	20.76 w	Mustapha Kamel Selmi (ALG)	20.84 w	Jean-Charles Trouabal (FRA)	20.88 w
400 metres	Antonio Sánchez (ESP)	45.98	Ismail Mačev (YUG)	46.23	Marcello Pantone (ITA)	46.40
800 metres	Faouzi Lahbi (MAR)	1:48.87	Saïd M'Hand (MAR)	1:49.52	Andrés Vera (ESP)	1:50.37
1500 metres	Saïd Aouita (MAR)	3:39.48	Zeki Öztürk (TUR)	3:40.53	Teófilo Benito (ESP)	3:41.27
5000 metres	Saïd Aouita (MAR)	13:38.05	Brahim Boutayeb (MAR)	13:40.73	Abel Antón (ESP)	13:48.26
10,000 metres	Féthi Baccouche (TUN)	28:39.66	Brahim Boutayeb (MAR)	28:40.34	Spyros Andriopoulos (GRE)	28:40.38
Marathon	Enrico Ogliar Badessi (ITA)	2:24:13	Georgios Afordakos (GRE)	2:25:23	Ahmet Altun (TUR)	2:25:29
3000 m steeplechase	Alessandro Lambruschini (ITA)	8:19.72	Saïd Aouita (MAR)	8:21.92	Féthi Baccouche (TUN)	8:35.33
110 metres hurdles (wind: -0.5 m/s)	Pascal Boussemart (FRA)	13.90	Gianni Tozzi (ITA)	13.92	Daniel Darien (FRA)	13.98
400 metres hurdles	José Alonso (ESP)	49.93	Jesús Ariño (ESP)	50.68	Angelo Locci (ITA)	51.05
High jump	Novica Čanović (YUG)	2.24 m	Luca Toso (ITA)	2.24 m	Daniele Pagani (ITA)	2.21 m
Pole vault	Gianni Stecchi (ITA)	5.30 m	Alain Morineau (FRA)	5.20 m	Giorgio Grassi (ITA)	5.20 m
Long jump	Dimitros Hatzopoulos (GRE)	7.89 m	Jean-Louis Rapnouil (FRA)	7.82 m	Othmane Belfaa (ALG)	7.61 m
Triple jump	Marios Hadjiandreou (CYP)	16.49 m	Ahmed Hassan Badra (EGY)	15.98 m	Theodoros Tantanozis (GRE)	15.96 m
Shot put	Dimitrios Koutsoukis (GRE)	19.23 m	Jovan Lazarević (YUG)	19.06 m	Aubert Tréguilly (FRA)	17.33 m
Discus throw	Marco Martino (ITA)	60.94 m	Kostas Georgakopoulos (GRE)	59.64 m	Hassan Ahmed Hamad (EGY)	58.12 m
Hammer throw	Lucio Serrani (ITA)	74.30 m GR	Ajet Toska (ALB)	74.06 m	Francisco Fuentes (ESP)	69.34 m
Javelin throw	Sejad Krdžalić (YUG)	74.78 m	Ivan Mustapić (YUG)	70.48 m	Hafez El-Hussein (SYR)	70.10 m
Decathlon	Marco Rossi (ITA)	7588 pts	Goran Kabić (YUG)	7515 pts	Saša Karan (YUG)	7503 pts
20 km race walk	Maurizio Damilano (ITA)	1:25:33	Carlo Mattioli (ITA)	1:25:34	Daniel Plaza (ESP)	1:25:47
4 x 100 metres relay	Italy; Paolo Catalano; Sandro Floris; Ezio Madonia; Stefano Tilli	39.67	Spain; Valentín Rocandio; Juan José Prado; Miguel Ángel García; Enrique Talavera	40.15	France; Alain Mazella; Thierry Laromanière; Jean-Charles Trouabal; Daniel Darien	40.16
4 x 400 metres relay	Italy; Andrea Montanari; Marcello Pantone; Vito Petrella; Roberto Ribaud	3:05.29	Spain; Juan José Prado; Cayetano Cornet; Jesús Ariño; Antonio Sánchez	3:07.48	Morocco	3:09.25

=== Women's events ===
Event	Gold		Silver		Bronze	
100 metres (wind: -1.1 m/s)	Violetta Kaminska (FRA)	11.76	Kornelija Šinković (YUG)	11.80	Laurence Bongard (FRA)	11.93
200 metres (wind: +1.6 m/s)	Marisa Masullo (ITA)	23.35	Kornelija Šinković (YUG)	23.37	Anna Rita Angotzi (ITA)	23.58
400 metres	Nathalie Simon (FRA)	52.68	Erica Rossi (ITA)	53.57	Cosetta Campana (ITA)	54.28
800 metres	Slobodanka Čolović (YUG)	2:00.94 GR	Snežana Pajkić (YUG)	2:02.91	Adriana Vejkollari (ALB)	2:03.27
1500 metres	Fatima Aouam (MAR)	4:10.96	Agnese Possamai (ITA)	4:13.98	Pavlina Evro (ALB)	4:14.94
3000 metres	Fatima Aouam (MAR)	8:58.07 GR	Rosanna Munerotto (ITA)	9:08.54	Rosario Murcia (FRA)	9:13.24
100 metres hurdles (wind: -0.5 m/s)	Patrizia Lombardo (ITA)	13.41	Carla Tuzzi (ITA)	13.57	Nacèra Zaaboub (ALG)	13.81
400 metres hurdles	Nawal El Moutawakel (MAR)	56.28 GR	Semra Aksu (TUR)	56.59	Irmgard Trojer (ITA)	57.25
High jump	Amra Temim (YUG)	1.87 m	Biljana Petrović (YUG)	1.84 m	Niki Bakoyianni (GRE)	1.84 m
Long jump	Antonella Capriotti (ITA)	6.43 m GR	Christine Leux (FRA)	6.04 m	Géraldine Bonnin (FRA)	5.90 m
Shot put	Agnese Maffeis (ITA)	15.90 m	Simone Créantor (FRA)	15.83 m	Souad Malloussi (MAR)	15.42 m
Discus throw	Maria Marello (ITA)	55.98 m GR	Lidia Rognini (ITA)	53.08 m	Isabelle Devaluez (FRA)	51.56 m
Javelin throw	Kristina Jazbinšek (YUG)	59.40 m	Anna Verouli (GRE)	58.92 m	Sofia Sakorafa (GRE)	57.16 m
Heptathlon	Nacèra Zaaboub (ALG)	5696 pts GR	Marina Mihajlova (YUG)	5676 pts	Stefania Frisiero (ITA)	5000 pts
4 x 100 metres relay	France; Nathalie Simon; Marine Cassin; Laurence Bongard; Violetta Kaminska	44.32	Italy; Anna Rita Angotzi; Annarita Balzani; Daniela Ferrian; Marisa Masullo	45.17	Greece; Marina Skordi; Georgia Zouganeli ? ?	46.98
4 x 400 metres relay	Italy; Cosetta Campana; Giuseppina Cirulli; Nevia Pistrino; Erica Rossi	3:32.14 GR	France; Martine Cassin; Christine Jaunin; Barbara Gourdet; Nathalie Simon	3:33.21	Syria; Sumayyah Yohanon; Hiyam Saleh; Sabiah Awad; Hala El-Moughrabi	4:01.35

== Men's results ==
=== 100 meters ===
Heats – 19 September
Wind: Heat 1: +2.6 m/s, Heat 2: +2.3 m/s

Rank	Heat	Name	Nationality	Time	Notes
1	2	Mustapha Kamel Selmi	Algeria	10.42	Q
1	1	Alain Mazzella	France	10.45	Q
2	1	Stefano Tilli	Italy	10.46	Q
4	1	Miguel Ángel García	Spain	10.48	q
2	2	Ezio Madonia	Italy	10.50	Q
3	2	Enrique Talavera	Spain	10.56	Q
?	2	Thierry Laromanière	France	10.61	

Final – 20 September
Wind: 0.0 m/s

Rank	Lane	Name	Nationality	Time	Notes
1st place, gold medalist(s)	3	Stefano Tilli	Italy	10.41	
2nd place, silver medalist(s)	1	Ezio Madonia	Italy	10.52	
3rd place, bronze medalist(s)	6	Mustapha Kamel Selmi	Algeria	10.56	
4	5	Alain Mazzella	France	10.64	
5	2	Enrique Talavera	Spain	10.73	
6	4	Yannis Zisimides	Cyprus	10.76	
7	8	Miguel Ángel García	Spain	10.88	
8	7	Thierry Laromanière	France	10.93	

=== 200 meters ===
Heats – 21 September
Wind: Heat 1: -0.4 m/s, Heat 2: -0.2 m/s

Rank	Heat	Name	Nationality	Time	Notes
1	1	Stefano Tilli	Italy	21.18	Q
1	2	Sandro Floris	Italy	21.20	Q
?	1	Jean-Charles Trouabal	France	21.27	
?	2	Alain Mazzella	France	21.39	
3	1	Juan José Prado	Spain	21.67	Q

Final – 23 September
Wind: +2.2 m/s

Rank	Name	Nationality	Time	Notes
1st place, gold medalist(s)	Stefano Tilli	Italy	20.76	
2nd place, silver medalist(s)	Mustapha Kamel Selmi	Algeria	20.84	
3rd place, bronze medalist(s)	Jean-Charles Trouabal	France	20.88	
4	Sandro Floris	Italy	20.98	
5	Alain Mazzella	France	21.11	
6	Juan José Prado	Spain	21.22	
7	Mihalis Vagenas	Greece	21.45	
8	Iannis Bitsis	Greece	21.45	

=== 400 meters ===
Heats – 20 September

Rank	Heat	Name	Nationality	Time	Notes
2	1	Marcello Pantone	Italy	46.60	Q
1	2	Antonio Sánchez	Spain	46.76	Q
3	2	Vito Petrella	Italy	47.12	Q
1	2	Cayetano Cornet	Spain	47.48	Q

Final – 21 September

Rank	Name	Nationality	Time	Notes
1st place, gold medalist(s)	Antonio Sánchez	Spain	45.98	
2nd place, silver medalist(s)	Ismail Mačev	Yugoslavia	46.23	
3rd place, bronze medalist(s)	Marcello Pantone	Italy	46.40	
4	Vito Petrella	Italy	46.60	
5	Emmanuel Esdras	France	46.88	
6	Pavle Pavlović	Yugoslavia	47.20	
7	Cayetano Cornet	Spain	47.24	
8	Abdelali Kasbane	Morocco	48.52	

=== 800 meters ===
Heats – 23 September

Rank	Heat	Name	Nationality	Time	Notes
?	?	André Lavie	France	1:52.65	
3	2	Andrés Vera	Spain	1:52.86	Q

Final – 24 September

Rank	Name	Nationality	Time	Notes
1st place, gold medalist(s)	Faouzi Lahbi	Morocco	1:48.87	
2nd place, silver medalist(s)	Saïd M'Hand	Morocco	1:49.52	
3rd place, bronze medalist(s)	Andrés Vera	Spain	1:50.37	
4	Sotirios Moutsanas	Greece	1:51.35	
5	Filippos Stylianoudes	Cyprus	1:52.15	
6	Thierry Tonnelier	France	1:52.28	
7	André Lavie	France	1:54.80	
	Mamoutie	Greece	DNF	

=== 1500 meters ===
20 September

Rank	Name	Nationality	Time	Notes
1st place, gold medalist(s)	Saïd Aouita	Morocco	3:39.48	
2nd place, silver medalist(s)	Zeki Öztürk	Turkey	3:40.53	
3rd place, bronze medalist(s)	Teófilo Benito	Spain	3:41.27	
4	Hocine Ameur	France	3:41.60	
5	Luca Vandi	Italy	3:42.21	
6	Hervé Phelippeau	France	3:42.45	
7	Riccardo Materazzi	Italy	3:43.36	
8	Mustapha Lachaal	Morocco	3:43.48	
10	Andrés Vera	Spain	3:45.33	

=== 5000 meters ===
21 September

Rank	Name	Nationality	Time	Notes
1st place, gold medalist(s)	Saïd Aouita	Morocco	13:38.05	
2nd place, silver medalist(s)	Brahim Boutayeb	Morocco	13:40.73	
3rd place, bronze medalist(s)	Abel Antón	Spain	13:48.26	
4	Ranieri Carenza	Italy	13:49.70	
5	Pascal Clouvel	France	13:51.04	
6	Zeki Öztürk	Turkey	13:56.97	
7	Miloud Djellal	Algeria	14:02.41	
8	Manolis Hantzos	Greece	14:03.73	
9	M. Kamarane	Lebanon	14:06.76	
10	Panagiotis Fotiou	Greece	14:25.34	
11	Thierry Pantel	France	14:26.44	
12	B. Hachem	Syria	14:33.53	
13	M. Alhariry	Syria	14:43.08	

=== 10,000 meters ===
19 September

Rank	Name	Nationality	Time	Notes
1st place, gold medalist(s)	Féthi Baccouche	Tunisia	28:39.66	
2nd place, silver medalist(s)	Brahim Boutayeb	Morocco	28:40.34	
3rd place, bronze medalist(s)	Spyros Andriopoulos	Greece	28:40.38	
4	Santiago Llorente	Spain	28:40.85	
5	Manolis Hantzos	Greece	28:56.06	
6	José Manuel Albentosa	Spain	29:09.95	
7	Miloud Djellal	Algeria	29:27.96	
8	Salvatore Nicosia	Italy	29:43.12	
	Philippe Legrand	France	DNF	
	Antonio Rapisarda	France	DNF	

=== Marathon ===
24 September

Rank	Name	Nationality	Time	Notes
1st place, gold medalist(s)	Enrico Ogliar Badessi	Italy	2:24:13	
2nd place, silver medalist(s)	Georgios Afordakos	Greece	2:25:23	
3rd place, bronze medalist(s)	Ahmed Altun	Turkey	2:25:29	
4	Bilal Hachem	Syria	2:25:50	
5	Tomislav Ašković	Yugoslavia	2:26:15	
6	Zeki Atlı	Turkey	2:26:55	
7	Joan Balsera	Spain	2:27:38	
8	Tasos Psathas	Greece	2:32:40	
	Marco Milani	Italy	DNF	
	Osvaldo Faustini	Italy	DNF	
	Juan Antonio García	Spain	DNF	

=== 110 meters hurdles ===
Heats – 19 September
Wind: Heat 1: +2.6 m/s, Heat 2: -2.5 m/s

Rank	Heat	Name	Nationality	Time	Notes
1	1	Gianni Tozzi	Italy	13.86	Q
?	1	Daniel Darien	France	13.86	Q
?	1	Antonio Llanau	Spain	14.00	Q
?	2	Pascal Boussemart	France	14.01	Q
?	2	Luigi Bertocchi	Italy	14.04	Q

Final – 20 September
Wind: -0.5 m/s

Rank	Name	Nationality	Time	Notes
1st place, gold medalist(s)	Pascal Boussemart	France	13.90	
2nd place, silver medalist(s)	Gianni Tozzi	Italy	13.92	
3rd place, bronze medalist(s)	Daniel Darien	France	13.98	
4	Antonio Llanau	Spain	14.13	
5	Luigi Bertocchi	Italy	14.26	
6	Aldin Obeid Kheir	Syria	14.28	
7	Stilianis Bisbas	Greece	14.46	

=== 400 meters hurdles ===
Heats – 20 September

Rank	Heat	Name	Nationality	Time	Notes
2	1	José Alonso	Spain	50.79	Q
1	2	Angelo Locci	Italy	50.82	Q
?	?	Dominique Duvigneau	France	51.22	
4	1	Jesús Arino	Spain	51.42	q
4	1	Fausto Frigerio	Italy	51.78	Q

Final – 21 September

Rank	Name	Nationality	Time	Notes
1st place, gold medalist(s)	José Alonso	Spain	49.93	
2nd place, silver medalist(s)	Jesús Arino	Spain	50.68	
3rd place, bronze medalist(s)	Angelo Locci	Italy	51.05	
4	Emmanuel Gonigam	France	51.31	
5	Fausto Frigerio	Italy	51.31	
6	Dominique Duvigneau	France	51.43	
7	Yiannis Ioannou	Cyprus	51.51	

=== 3000 meters steeplechase ===
24 September

Rank	Name	Nationality	Time	Notes
1st place, gold medalist(s)	Alessandro Lambruschini	Italy	8:19.72	
2nd place, silver medalist(s)	Saïd Aouita	Morocco	8:21.92	
3rd place, bronze medalist(s)	Féthi Baccouche	Tunisia	8:35.33	
4	Azzedine Brahmi	Algeria	8:37.27	
5	Brahim Ayachi	Tunisia	8:38.84	
6	Rabah Aboura	Algeria	8:45.15	
7	Francisco Sánchez	Spain	8:53.10	
8	Mauro Pregnolato	Italy	8:57.54	

=== 4 x 100 meters relay ===
24 September

Rank	Nation	Competitors	Time	Notes
1st place, gold medalist(s)	Italy	Paolo Catalano, Sandro Floris, Ezio Madonia, Stefano Tilli	39.67	
2nd place, silver medalist(s)	Spain	Valentín Rocandio, Juan José Prado, Miguel Ángel García, Enrique Talavera	40.15	
3rd place, bronze medalist(s)	France	Alain Mazella, Thierry Laromanière, Jean-Charles Trouabal, Daniel Darien	40.16	
4	Cyprus		41.36	
5	Syria		41.77	
6	Libya		42.08	
	Greece		DNF	

=== 4 x 400 meters relay ===
24 September

Rank	Nation	Competitors	Time	Notes
1st place, gold medalist(s)	Italy	Andrea Montanari, Marcello Pantone, Vito Petrella, Roberto Ribaud	3:05.29	
2nd place, silver medalist(s)	Spain	Juan José Prado, Cayetano Cornet, Jesús Ariño, Antonio Sánchez	3:07.48	
3rd place, bronze medalist(s)	Morocco		3:09.25	
4	France	Emmanuel Gonigam, Emmanuel Esdras, Dominique Duvigneau, Thierry Tonnelier	3:09.84	
5	Syria		3:11.45	
6	Cyprus		3:20.93	

=== 20 kilometers walk ===
19 September

Rank	Name	Nationality	Time	Notes
1st place, gold medalist(s)	Maurizio Damilano	Italy	1:25:33	
2nd place, silver medalist(s)	Carlo Mattioli	Italy	1:25:34	
3rd place, bronze medalist(s)	Daniel Plaza	Spain	1:25:47	
4	Giorgio Damilano	Italy	1:26:16	
5	Jean-Claude Corre	France	1:28:44	
6	Antonio González	Spain	1:30:38	
7	Christos Karagiorgos	Greece	1:31:37	
	Philippe Lafleur	France	DNF	

=== High jump ===
Rank	Name	Nationality	Result	Notes
1st place, gold medalist(s)	Novica Čanović	Yugoslavia	2.24	
2nd place, silver medalist(s)	Luca Toso	Italy	2.24	
3rd place, bronze medalist(s)	Daniele Pagani	Italy	2.21	
4	Vincent Gouzalch	France	2.15	
5	Khalid Koughbar	Morocco	2.15	
6	Othmane Belfaa	Algeria	2.10	
7	Mohamed Aghlal	Morocco	2.05	
	Dany Dhaneus	France	NM	

=== Pole vault ===
23 September

Rank	Name	Nationality	Result	Notes
1st place, gold medalist(s)	Gianni Stecchi	Italy	5.30	
2nd place, silver medalist(s)	Alain Morineau	France	5.20	
3rd place, bronze medalist(s)	Giorgio Grassi	Italy	5.20	
4	Ousana Nihlawi	Syria	4.40	

=== Long jump ===
Rank	Name	Nationality	#1	#2	#3	#4	#5	#6	Result	Notes
1st place, gold medalist(s)	Dimitrios Hatzopoulos	Greece							7.89	
2nd place, silver medalist(s)	Jean-Louis Rapnouil	France	7.12	6.63	7.55	7.36	7.82	7.67	7.82	
3rd place, bronze medalist(s)	Othmane Belfaa	Algeria							7.61	
4	Dimitrios Delifotis	Greece							7.59	
5	Giancarlo Biscarini	Italy							7.51	
6	Mohamed El Aïd Zaghdoudi	Tunisia							7.41	
7	Mustapha Benmrah	Morocco							7.37	
8	Assad Nakour	Syria							7.08	

=== Triple jump ===
Rank	Name	Nationality	Result	Notes
1st place, gold medalist(s)	Marios Hadjiandreou	Cyprus	16.49	
2nd place, silver medalist(s)	Hassan Hamed Badra	Egypt	15.98	
3rd place, bronze medalist(s)	Theodoros Tandanozis	Greece	15.96	
4	Fethi Khelid Aboud	Libya	15.84	
5	Mustapha Banmrah	Morocco	15.20	

=== Shot put ===
19 September

Rank	Name	Nationality	#1	#2	#3	#4	#5	#6	Result	Notes
1st place, gold medalist(s)	Dimitrios Koutsoukis	Greece							19.23	
2nd place, silver medalist(s)	Jovan Lazarević	Yugoslavia							19.06	
3rd place, bronze medalist(s)	Aubert Tréguilly	France							17.33	
4	Mohamed Fatihi	Morocco							17.13	
5	Ahmed Kamel Chatta	Egypt							16.39	
6	Martín Vara	Spain	15.54	15.69	x	15.27	15.93	16.22	16.22	
7	Adnan Houri	Syria							14.41	

=== Discus throw ===
21 September

Rank	Name	Nationality	Result	Notes
1st place, gold medalist(s)	Marco Martino	Italy	60.94	
2nd place, silver medalist(s)	Kostadinos Georgakopoulos	Greece	59.64	
3rd place, bronze medalist(s)	Hassan Ahmed Hamad	Egypt	58.12	
4	Dragan Mustapić	Yugoslavia	57.12	
5	Mohamed Naguib Hamed	Egypt	56.88	
6	Serge Avedissian	France	56.12	
7	Dimitrios Koutsoukis	Greece	54.74	
8	Antonio Roccabella	Italy	53.44	
9	David Martínez	Spain	52.34	

=== Hammer throw ===
23 September

Rank	Name	Nationality	Result	Notes
1st place, gold medalist(s)	Lucio Serrani	Italy	74.30	
2nd place, silver medalist(s)	Ajet Toska	Albania	74.06	
3rd place, bronze medalist(s)	Francisco Fuentes	Spain	69.34	
4	Hakim Toumi	Algeria	68.64	
5	Triandafilos Apostolidis	Greece	67.92	
6	Giuliano Zanello	Italy	66.74	
7	Roland Dufour	France	62.50	
8	Murat Elçin	Turkey	58.85	

=== Javelin throw ===
Rank	Name	Nationality	Result	Notes
1st place, gold medalist(s)	Sejad Krdžalić	Yugoslavia	74.78	
2nd place, silver medalist(s)	Ivan Mustapić	Yugoslavia	70.48	
3rd place, bronze medalist(s)	Hafez Al-Hussein	Syria	70.10	
4	Athanassios Peristeris	Greece	69.90	
5	Bassan Al-Shater	Syria	68.26	
6	Fabio De Gaspari	Italy	67.70	
7	Metin Altıntaş	Turkey	64.76	
8	Andonis Papadimitriou	Greece	61.78	

=== Decathlon ===
19–20 September

The highest mark recorded in each event is highlighted in yellow

Rank	Athlete	Nationality	100m	LJ	SP	HJ	400m	110m H	DT	PV	JT	1500m	Points	Notes
1st place, gold medalist(s)	Marco Rossi	Italy	11.03	6.53	13.93	1.93	49.18	14.92	44.16	4.40	52.60	4:29.75	7588	
2nd place, silver medalist(s)	Goran Kabić	Yugoslavia	11.48	7.11w	14.58	1.87	53.16	14.80	41.86	3.80	64.02	4:26.61	7515w	
3rd place, bronze medalist(s)	Saša Karan	Yugoslavia	11.50	6.88	12.77	1.99	49.92	14.91	46.10	4.00	54.26	4:24.59	7503	
4	Jean-Bernard Royer	France	11.31	6.77	12.28	1.96	50.77	14.98	43.32	4.50	56.76	4:43.92	7411	
5	Moreno Martini	Italy	11.58	6.77	12.55	2.10	52.48	16.26	41.42	4.30	59.48	4:40.53	7242	
6	Dimitrios Papadopoulos	Greece	11.62	7.00	13.42	2.02	52.54	15.60	37.82	4.10	48.32	4:46.13	7007	
7	Yves Lesaulnier	France	11.47	6.95	13.47	1.99	52.36	15.29	38.72	NM	56.84	DNF	5904	
8	Imad Leimouni	Syria	11.50	5.88	9.28	1.70	51.94	19.65	30.54	3.40	49.20	4:40.05	5594	

== Women's results ==
=== 100 meters ===
Heats – 19 September

Rank	Heat	Name	Nationality	Time	Notes
?	?	Violetta Kaminska	France	11.60	Q, +1.6
?	?	Laurence Bongard	France	11.75	Q, +1.2
3	2	Daniela Ferrian	Italy	11.83	Q
3	1	Rosselo Tarolo	Italy	11.91	Q

Final – 20 September
Wind: -1.1 m/s

Rank	Name	Nationality	Time	Notes
1st place, gold medalist(s)	Violetta Kaminska	France	11.76	
2nd place, silver medalist(s)	Kornelija Šinković	Yugoslavia	11.80	
3rd place, bronze medalist(s)	Laurence Bongard	France	11.93	
4	Daniela Ferrian	Italy	11.94	
5	Marina Skordi	Greece	11.97	
6	Rosselo Tarolo	Italy	12.02	
7	Georgia Paspali	Cyprus	12.29	
8	Georgia Zouganeli	Greece	12.47	

=== 200 meters ===
Heats

Rank	Heat	Name	Nationality	Time	Notes
1	1	Marisa Masullo	Italy	23.74	Q
1	2	Anna Rita Angotzi	Italy	23.89	Q
?	?	Laurence Bongard	France	24.02	-0.6
?	?	Martine Cassin	France	24.17	-0.6

Final
Wind: +1.6 m/s

Rank	Name	Nationality	Time	Notes
1st place, gold medalist(s)	Marisa Masullo	Italy	23.35	
2nd place, silver medalist(s)	Kornelija Šinković	Yugoslavia	23.37	
3rd place, bronze medalist(s)	Anna Rita Angotzi	Italy	23.58	
4	Marina Skordi	Greece	23.64	
5	Martine Cassin	France	23.69	
6	Laurence Bongard	France	23.92	
7	Georgia Zouganeli	Greece	24.79	
8	Hala El-Moughrabi	Syria	24.90	

=== 400 meters ===
Rank	Name	Nationality	Time	Notes
1st place, gold medalist(s)	Nathalie Simon	France	52.68	
2nd place, silver medalist(s)	Erica Rossi	Italy	53.57	
3rd place, bronze medalist(s)	Cosetta Campana	Italy	54.28	
4	Hala El-Moughrabi	Syria	55.39	
5	Christine Jaunin	France	55.69	
6	Sevil Sahin	Tunisia	56.35	

=== 800 meters ===
Heats – 23 September

Rank	Heat	Name	Nationality	Time	Notes
3	1	Nicoletta Tozzi	Italy	2:06.26	Q
4	2	Rosa Colorado	Spain	2:06.34	q
4	?	Barbara Gourdet	France	2:06.68	
7	2	Valentina Tauceri	Italy	2:09.98	

Final – 24 September

Rank	Name	Nationality	Time	Notes
1st place, gold medalist(s)	Slobodanka Čolović	Yugoslavia	2:00.94	
2nd place, silver medalist(s)	Snežana Pajkić	Yugoslavia	2:02.91	
3rd place, bronze medalist(s)	Adriana Vejkollari	Albania	2:03.27	
4	Hassiba Boulmerka	Algeria	2:04.33	
5	Christine Hanon	France	2:04.34	
6	Anila Meshri	Albania	2:07.81	
7	Nicoletta Tozzi	Italy	2:11.53	
	Rosa Colorado	Spain	DNF	

=== 1500 meters ===
20 September

Rank	Name	Nationality	Time	Notes
1st place, gold medalist(s)	Fatima Aouam	Morocco	4:10.96	
2nd place, silver medalist(s)	Agnese Possamai	Italy	4:13.98	
3rd place, bronze medalist(s)	Pavlina Evro	Albania	4:14.94	
4	Andri Avraam	Cyprus	4:15.58	
5	Arila Mekshi	Albania	4:16.47	
6	Betty Molteni	Italy	4:18.56	
7	Irini Theodoridou	Greece	4:19.08	
8	Patricia Demilly	France	4:23.05	

=== 3000 meters ===
23 September

Rank	Name	Nationality	Time	Notes
1st place, gold medalist(s)	Fatima Aouam	Morocco	8:58.07	
2nd place, silver medalist(s)	Rosanna Munerotto	Italy	9:08.54	
3rd place, bronze medalist(s)	Rosario Murcia	France	9:13.24	
4	Patricia Demilly	France	9:18.38	
5	Andri Avraam	Cyprus	9:24.09	
6	Pavlina Evro	Albania	9:26.23	
7	Nadia Ouaziz	Morocco	9:27.57	
8	Dimitra Papaspirou	Greece	9:36.62	
	Ana Isabel Alonso	Spain	DNF	
	Agnese Possamai	Italy	DNF	

=== 100 meters hurdles ===
Wind: -0.5 m/s

Rank	Name	Nationality	Time	Notes
1st place, gold medalist(s)	Patrizia Lombardo	Italy	13.41	
2nd place, silver medalist(s)	Carla Tuzzi	Italy	13.57	
3rd place, bronze medalist(s)	Nacèra Zaaboub	Algeria	13.81	
4	Véronique Truwant	France	13.85	
5	Nezha Bidouane	Morocco	14.76	
	Elissavet Pantazi	Greece	DNF	

=== 400 meters hurdles ===
Heats

Rank	Heat	Name	Nationality	Time	Notes
1	2	Giuseppina Cirulli	Italy	58.00	Q
3	1	Irmgard Trojer	Italy	59.02	Q
?	?	Catherine Lebreton	France	1:00.24	

Final – 20 September

Rank	Name	Nationality	Time	Notes
1st place, gold medalist(s)	Nawal El Moutawakel	Morocco	56.28	
2nd place, silver medalist(s)	Semra Aksu	Turkey	56.59	
3rd place, bronze medalist(s)	Irmgard Trojer	Italy	57.25	
4	Giuseppina Cirulli	Italy	57.55	
5	Annie Moëllo	France	58.67	
6	Hionati Kapeti	Greece	59.16	
7	Catherine Lebreton	France	1:00.58	
8	Noura Omar	Syria	1:08.39	
	Monteserrat Pujol	Spain	DNF	

=== 4 x 100 meters relay ===
Rank	Nation	Competitors	Time	Notes
1st place, gold medalist(s)	France	Nathalie Simon, Marine Cassin, Laurence Bongard, Violetta Kaminska	44.32	
2nd place, silver medalist(s)	Italy	Anna Rita Angotzi, Annarita Balzani, Daniela Ferrian, Marisa Masullo	45.17	
3rd place, bronze medalist(s)	Greece	Marina Skordi, Georgia Zouganeli, ?, ?	46.98	
4	Cyprus		47.11	
5	Syria		48.87	

=== 4 x 400 meters relay ===
Rank	Nation	Competitors	Time	Notes
1st place, gold medalist(s)	Italy	Cosetta Campana, Giuseppina Cirulli, Nevia Pistrino, Erica Rossi	3:32.14	
2nd place, silver medalist(s)	France	Martine Cassin, Christine Jaunin, Barbara Gourdet, Nathalie Simon	3:33.21	
3rd place, bronze medalist(s)	Syria	Sumayyah Yohanon, Hiyam Saleh, Sabiah Awad, Hala El-Moughrabi	4:01.35	

=== High jump ===
Rank	Name	Nationality	Result	Notes
1st place, gold medalist(s)	Amca Temim	Yugoslavia	1.87	
2nd place, silver medalist(s)	Biljana Petrović	Yugoslavia	1.84	
3rd place, bronze medalist(s)	Niki Bakoyianni	Greece	1.84	
4	Miceala Tarantino	Italy	1.81	
5	Nacèra Zaaboub	Algeria	1.75	
6	Touria Aboudi	Morocco	1.60	
7	Haifaa Abbas	Syria	1.40	

=== Long jump ===
23 September

Rank	Name	Nationality	#1	#2	#3	#4	#5	#6	Result	Notes
1st place, gold medalist(s)	Antonella Capriotti	Italy							6.43	
2nd place, silver medalist(s)	Christine Leux	France	6.04	5.97	6.04	6.00	x	5.68	6.04	
3rd place, bronze medalist(s)	Géraldine Bonnin	France	5.90	x	5.76	5.81	x	x	5.90	
4	Maria Elefthriou	Cyprus							5.76	
5	Estrella Roldán	Spain	5.73	x	x	x	5.74	x	5.74	
6	Paraskevi Patoulidou	Greece							5.54	
7	Soumaya Yohanon	Syria							5.27	
8	Hiyam Saleh	Syria							5.27	

=== Shot put ===
24 September

Rank	Name	Nationality	#1	#2	#3	#4	#5	#6	Result	Notes
1st place, gold medalist(s)	Agnese Maffeis	Italy							15.90	
2nd place, silver medalist(s)	Simone Créantor	France							15.83	
3rd place, bronze medalist(s)	Souad Malloussi	Morocco							15.42	
4	Margarita Ramos	Spain	12.99	14.14	13.68	13.41	13.66	13.44	14.14	
5	Valérie Hanicque	France							14.09	
6	Halana Ahmed Khaled	Egypt							13.55	
7	Sevgi Sen	Turkey							13.10	
8	Marie Hazim	Syria							10.55	

=== Discus throw ===
20 September

Rank	Name	Nationality	Result	Notes
1st place, gold medalist(s)	Maria Marello	Italy	55.98	
2nd place, silver medalist(s)	Lidia Rognini	Italy	53.08	
3rd place, bronze medalist(s)	Isabelle Devaluez	France	51.56	
4	Suzana Golubić	Yugoslavia	51.40	
5	Zoubida Laayouni	Morocco	51.34	
6	Ángeles Barreiro	Spain	51.34	
7	Valérie Hanicque	France	51.02	
8	Halana Ahmed Khaled	Egypt	43.98	

=== Javelin throw ===
23 September

Rank	Name	Nationality	#1	#2	#3	#4	#5	#6	Result	Notes
1st place, gold medalist(s)	Kristina Jazbinšek	Yugoslavia							59.40	
2nd place, silver medalist(s)	Anna Verouli	Greece							58.92	
3rd place, bronze medalist(s)	Sofia Sakorafa	Greece							57.16	
4	Fausta Quintavalla	Italy							52.56	
5	Samia Djémaa	Algeria							51.56	
6	Natividad Vizcaíno	Spain	x	41.94	49.40	x	x	49.46	49.46	
7	Wilma Vidotto	Italy							49.20	
8	Chrisala Georgiou	Cyprus							47.12	
9	Christine Gravier	France	x	45.16	47.10				47.10	

=== Heptathlon ===
September 23–24

Rank	Athlete	Nationality	100m H	HJ	SP	200m	LJ	JT	800m	Points	Notes
1st place, gold medalist(s)	Nacèra Zaaboub	Algeria	13.91	1.75	12.55	24.95	5.80	38.02	2:23.06	5696	
2nd place, silver medalist(s)	Marina Mihajlova	Yugoslavia	14.49	1.72	11.47	25.40	6.03	40.62	2:16.42	5676	
3rd place, bronze medalist(s)	Stefania Frisiero	Italy	14.89	1.63	11.24	25.55	5.33	36.32	2:31.31	5000	
	Ana Pérez	Spain	15.57	1.60	10.77	27.47	DNS	–	–	DNF	
