= Italy at the 1987 Mediterranean Games =

- IOC code: ITA
- NOC: Italian National Olympic Committee

in Latakia
- Medals Ranked 1st: Gold 69 Silver 45 Bronze 38 Total 152

Mediterranean Games appearances (overview)
- 1951; 1955; 1959; 1963; 1967; 1971; 1975; 1979; 1983; 1987; 1991; 1993; 1997; 2001; 2005; 2009; 2013; 2018; 2022; 2026

Italy competed at the 1987 Mediterranean Games in Latakia, Syria.

== Medals ==
=== Athletics ===
Sport	Gold	Silver	Bronze	Total
Athletics	17	10	8	35
Totals (1 entries)	17	10	8	35

==== Men ====
Event	1st place, gold medalist(s)	2nd place, silver medalist(s)	3rd place, bronze medalist(s)
100 metres	Stefano Tilli	Ezio Madonia	
200 metres	Stefano Tilli		
3000 metres steeplechase	Alessandro Lambruschini		
Marathon	Enrico Oligarbadessi		
Pole vault	Gianni Stecchi		Giorgio Grassi
Discus throw	Marco Martino		
Hammer throw	Lucio Serrani		
Decathlon	Marco Rossi		
20 km walk	Maurizio Damilano	Carlo Mattioli	
4×100 metres relay	Paolo Catalano; Sandro Floris; Ezio Madonia; Stefano Tilli		
4×400 metres relay	Roberto Ribaud; Andrea Montanari; Vito Petrella; Marcello Pantone		
110 metres hurdlers		Gianni Tozzi	
High jump		Luca Toso	Daniele Pagani
400 metres			Marcello Pantone
400 metres hurdlers			Angelo Locci
	11	4	4

==== Women ====
Event	1st place, gold medalist(s)	2nd place, silver medalist(s)	3rd place, bronze medalist(s)
200 metres	Marisa Masullo		Anna Rita Angotzi
100 metres hurdles	Patrizia Lombardo	Carla Tuzzi	
Long jump	Antonella Capriotti		
Shot put	Agnese Maffeis		
Discus throw	Maria Marello	Lidia Rognini	
4×400 metres relay	Cosetta Campana; Giuseppina Cirulli; Nevia Pristino; Erica Rossi		
400 metres		Erica Rossi	Cosetta Campana
1500 metres		Agnese Possamai	
3000 metres		Rosanna Munerotto	
4×100 metres relay		Anna Rita Angotzi; Annarita Balzani; Daniela Ferrian; Marisa Masullo	
400 metres hurdles			Irmgard Trojer
Heptathlon			Stefania Frisiero
	6	6	4

== See also ==
- Boxing at the 1987 Mediterranean Games
- Swimming at the 1987 Mediterranean Games
- Volleyball at the 1987 Mediterranean Games
