= 1987 Italian Athletics Championships =

Edition of the Italian Athletics Championships

- Dates: 28–30 July
- Host city: Rome (main events)
- Venue: Stadio Olimpico
- Level: Senior
- Events: 47 (26 men, 21 women)

The 1987 Italian Athletics Championships was the 77th edition of the Italian Athletics Championships and were held in Rome.

== Champions ==
The table also includes the national champions of non-track and field events whose competitions were not held in Rome.

Non-track and field events

Full results.

=== Men ===
| Event | Athlete | Performance |
|---|---|---|
| 100 metres | Pierfrancesco Pavoni | 10.39 |
| 200 metres | Pierfrancesco Pavoni | 20.59 |
| 400 metres | Marcello Pantone | 46.17 |
| 800 metres | Tonino Viali | 1:48.05 |
| 1500 metres | Claudio Patrignani | 3:46.24 |
| 5000 metres | Ranieri Carenza | 13:55.04 |
| 10,000 metres | Giuseppe Miccoli | 29:22.76 |
| 110 metres hurdles | Gianni Tozzi | 14.01 |
| 400 metres hurdles | Angelo Locci | 50.32 |
| 3000 metres steeplechase | Alessandro Lambruschini | 8:19.17 |
| High jump | Daniele Pagani | 2.24 |
| Pole vault | Gianni Stecchi | 5.60 |
| Long jump | Giuseppe Bertozzi | 7.77 |
| Triple jump | Dario Badinelli | 16.39 |
| Shot put | Marco Montelatici | 18.26 |
| Discus throw | Marco Martino | 60.48 |
| Hammer throw | Lucio Serrani | 74.18 |
| Javelin throw | Fabio De Gaspari | 73.80 |
| Decathlon (Note: Held in Brunico 8-9 August) | Moreno Martini | 7402 |
| Half Marathon | Davide Bergamini | 01:04:23 |
| Marathon | Salvatore Bettiol | 02:10:01 |
| 10,000 metres track walk | Maurizio Damilano | 1:01:31# |
| 20 km road walk | Carlo Mattioli | 01:25:53 |
| 50 km road walk | Giovanni Pericelli | 03:47:50 |
| Cross country (long course) | Francesco Panetta | |
| Mountain running | Alfonso Vallicella | |

=== Women ===
| Event | Athlete | Performance |
|---|---|---|
| 100 metres | Marisa Masullo | 11.73 |
| 200 metres | Marisa Masullo | 23.71 |
| 400 metres | Erica Rossi | 53.10 |
| 800 metres | Nicoletta Tozzi | 2:05.59 |
| 1500 metres | Betty Molteni | 4:16.40 |
| 3000 metres | Agnese Possamai | 9:08.77 |
| 10,000 metres | Maria Curatolo | 33:30.66 |
| 100 metres hurdles | Carla Tuzzi | 13.36 |
| 400 metres hurdles | Irmgard Trojer | 56.82 |
| High jump | Alessandra Bonfigliolo | 1.86 |
| Long jump | Antonella Capriotti | 6.40 |
| Shot put | Maria Assunta Chiumariello | 16.58 |
| Discus throw | Maria Marello | 57.28 |
| Javelin throw | Vilma Vidotto | 51.60* |
| Heptathlon (Note: Held in Pavullo 8-9 August) | Stefania Frisiero | 5509 |
| Half Marathon | Cristina Tomasini | 01:17:30 |
| Marathon | Rita Marchisio | 02:29:36 |
| 5000 Metres Track Walk | Giuliana Salce | 22:51.56 |
| Cross country (long course) | Maria Curatolo | |
| Mountain running | Maria Cocchetti | |
| 10 Kilometres Road Walk | Ileana Salvador | 52:50:00 |
