= 1986 Italian Athletics Championships =

Edition of the Italian Athletics Championships

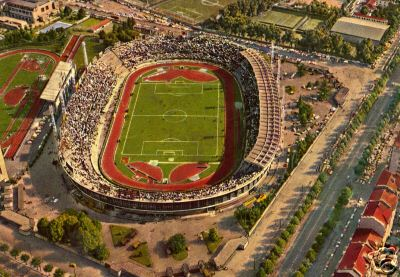
- Stadio Comunale in 1960s. Since 2006, on the occasion of its restructuring for the 2006 Winter Olympics, the running track was eliminated.
- Dates: 22–24 July
- Host city: Turin (main events); Schio (combined events)
- Venue: Stadio Comunale
- Level: Senior
- Events: 47 (26 men, 21 women)

The 1986 Italian Athletics Championships was the 76th edition of the Italian Athletics Championships and were held in Turin.

== Champions ==
The table also includes the national champions of non-track and field events whose competitions were not held in Turin.

Non-track and field events

Full results.

=== Men ===
Event	Athlete	Performance
100 metres	Stefano Tilli	10.48
200 metres	Stefano Tilli	20.72
400 metres	Mauro Zuliani	46.05
800 metres	Alberto Barsotti	1:47.88
1500 metres	Alessandro Lambruschini	3:46.36
5000 metres	Stefano Mei	13:56.61
10,000 metres	Francesco Panetta	28:00.20
110 metres hurdles	Daniele Fontecchio	13.86
400 metres hurdles	Luca Cosi	50.99
3000 metres steeplechase	Alessandro Lambruschini	8:33.14
High jump	Gianni Davito	2.24
Pole vault	Gianni Stecchi	5.40
Long jump	Giovanni Evangelisti	8.13
Triple jump	Dario Badinelli	16.25
Shot put	Alessandro Andrei	21.29
Discus throw	Marco Martino	63.14
Hammer throw	Lucio Serrani	74.80
Javelin throw	Agostino Ghesini	74.92
Decathlon	Marco Rossi	7490
Half Marathon	Salvatore Bettiol	01:04:20
Marathon	Osvaldo Faustini	02:16:03
10,000 metres track walk	Carlo Mattioli	40:13.50
20 km road walk	Maurizio Damilano	01:23:55
50 km road walk	Maurizio Damilano	03:51:50
Cross country (long course)	Alberto Cova	
Mountain running	Fausto Bonzi	

=== Women ===
Event	Athlete	Performance
100 metres	Rossella Tarolo	11.69
200 metres	Daniela Ferrian	23.73
400 metres	Cosetta Campana	54.06
800 metres	Nicoletta Tozzi	2:04.57
1500 metres	Roberta Brunet	4:21.84
3000 metres	Roberta Brunet	9:06.74
10,000 metres	Cristina Tomasini	33:12.01
100 metres hurdles	Mary Massarin	13.64
400 metres hurdles	Giuseppina Cirulli	57.80
High jump	Alessandra Fossati	1.86
Long jump	Antonella Capriotti	6.47
Shot put	Maria Assunta Chiumariello	15.91
Discus throw	Sandra Benedet	52.78
Javelin throw	Fausta Quintavalla	59.80*
Heptathlon	Claudia Del Fabbro	5441
Half Marathon	Maria Curatolo	01:13:59
Marathon	Paola Moro	02:38:10
5000 Metres Track Walk	Maria Grazia Cogoli	23:08.68
Cross country (long course)	Agnese Possamai	
Mountain running	Valentina Bottarelli	
10 km road walk	Nadia Forestan	50:10:00
