= 1988 Italian Athletics Championships =

Edition of the Italian Athletics Championships

- Dates: 6–8 September
- Host city: Milan (main events)
- Venue: Stadio Olimpico
- Level: Senior
- Events: 47 (26 men, 21 women)

The 1988 Italian Athletics Championships was the 78th edition of the Italian Athletics Championships and were held in Milan.

== Champions ==
The table also includes the national champions of non-track and field events whose competitions were not held in Milan.

Non-track and field events

Full results.

=== Men ===
Event	Athlete	Performance
100 metres	Antonio Ullo	10.48
200 metres	Stefano Tilli	20.85
400 metres	not contested	
800 metres	Donato Sabia	1:51.90
1500 metres	Davide Tirelli	3:46.03
5000 metres	Francesco Panetta	13:37.43
10,000 metres	Giuseppe Miccoli	28:30.81
110 metres hurdles	Gianni Tozzi	14.21
400 metres hurdles	Luca Cosi	51.47
3000 metres steeplechase	Francesco Panetta	8:21.45
High jump	Luca Toso	2.24
Pole vault	Marco Andreini	5.40
Long jump	Milko Campus	7.53
Triple jump	Dario Badinelli	16.29
Shot put	Marco Montelatici	18.15
Discus throw	Marco Martino	60.10
Hammer throw	Lucio Serrani	78.02
Javelin throw	Fabio De Gaspari	71.90
Decathlon (Note: Held in Bolzano 20-21 August)	Marco Rossi	7673
Half Marathon	Salvatore Bettiol	01:02:59
Marathon	Carlo Terzer	02:18:09
10,000 metres track walk	Giovanni De Benedictis	40:33.00
20 km road walk	Maurizio Damilano	01:20:26
50 km road walk	Raffaello Ducceschi	03:44:27
Cross country (long course)	Francesco Panetta	
Mountain running	Dino Tadello	

=== Women ===
Event	Athlete	Performance
100 metres	Marisa Masullo	11.60
200 metres	Marisa Masullo	23.70
400 metres	Rossana Morabito	53.83
800 metres	Nicoletta Tozzi	2:07.50
1500 metres	Roberta Brunet	4:16.79
3000 metres	Roberta Brunet	8:58.97
10,000 metres	Maria Curatolo	33:35.07
100 metres hurdles	Carla Tuzzi	13.73
400 metres hurdles	Irmgard Trojer	56.44
High jump	Barbara Fiammengo	1.87
Long jump	Antonella Capriotti	6.50
Shot put	Concetta Milanese	15.81
Discus throw	Maria Marello	55.24
Javelin throw	Stefania Galbiati	52.02*
Heptathlon	Herta Steiner	5570
Half Marathon	Maria Curatolo	01:14:00
Marathon	Graziella Struli	02:36:02
5000 Metres Track Walk	Pier Carola Pagani	22:33.82
Cross country (long course)	Maria Curatolo	
Mountain running	Maria Cocchetti	
10 Kilometres Road Walk	Erica Alfridi	52:27:00
