= Athletics at the World School Sport Games =

Athletics is one of the core sports on the programme for the Gymnasiade, an international multi-sport event organised by the International School Sport Federation (ISF). It has featured at all editions of the competition since 1976. An athletics competition was held the same year as the inaugural 1974 Gymnasiade, but was held separately at a different location. The event, contested by youth athletes under eighteen years old, was used as a reference point by the International Association of Athletics Federations (IAAF) when organising its first IAAF World Youth Championships in Athletics in 1999.

== Editions ==
Edition	Year	City	Country	Date	Venue	Events
1st	1974	Florence	Italy			26
2nd	1976	Orléans	France	21–27 June		30
3rd	1978	İzmir	Turkey	18–24 July		30
4th	1980	Turin	Italy	1–7 June		32
5th	1982	Lille	France	1–6 June		35
6th	1984	Florence	Italy	5–9 June		37
7th	1986	Nice	France	2–7 June		37
8th	1988	Barcelona	Spain	3–9 June		37
9th	1990	Bruges	Belgium	20–27 May		37
10th	1994	Nicosia	Cyprus	14–21 May		37
11th	1998	Shanghai	China	12–19 October		37
12th	2002	Caen	France	27 May – 3 June	Stade nautique, Stade Hélitas, Parc des Expositions	34
13th	2006	Thessaloniki	Greece	26 June – 3 July	Kaftanzoglio Stadium	34
14th	2009	Doha	Qatar	7–12 December	Aspire Dome	34
15th	2013	Brasília	Brazil	28 November – 4 December	Ginásio Nilson Nelson	36
16th	2016	Trabzon	Turkey	11–18 July	Trabzon Athletics Stadium	0
17th	2018	Rabat	Morocco			0
18th	2020		China			0
19th	2022		France			0

== Champions ==
=== Boys track ===
Year	100 m	200 m	400 m	800 m	1500 m	3000 m
1974	Miguel Arnau (ESP)	—	Dele Udo (NGR)	Paul Millet (FRA)	—	José Luis González (ESP)
1976	Giovanni Grazioli (ITA)	Antonis Georgallides (CYP)	Antônio Dias Ferreira (BRA)	Marco De Angelis (ITA)	Claudio Patrignani (ITA)	Féthi Baccouche (TUN)
1978	Bruno Jankowski (FRA)	Denis Favrot (FRA)	Andrea Spagnol (ITA)	Mario Lala (ITA)	Miguel Ángel Lindoso (ESP)	Hanifi Atmaca (TUR)
1980	Jean-François Angelie (FRA)	Jean-Jacques Boussemart (FRA)	Joaquim Cruz (BRA)	Joaquim Cruz (BRA)	Raf Wijns (BEL)	Stefano Mei (ITA)
1982	Steve Eden (ENG)	Steve Eden (ENG)	Rosan Rauzduel (FRA)	Yves Gardès (FRA)	Andrew Rodgers (ENG)	Angelo Brunetti (ITA)
1984	Ivan Sgaria (ITA)	Thierry Frieré (FRA)	Predrag Melnjak (YUG)	Jean-Joseph Hector (FRA)	Róbert Banai (HUN)	Salvatore Signorino (ITA)
1986	Pascal Théophile (FRA)	Jean-Daniel Allagui (FRA)	Peter Crampton (ENG)	Kevin McKay (ENG)	Savino Tondo (ITA)	Haydar Dogan (TUR)
1988	Juha Olava (FIN)	Stefano Paladini (ITA)	Jean-Philippe Brunel (FRA)	Niklas Norling (SWE)	Du Dunliang (CHN)	Oriol Nin Barrull (ESP)
1990	David Jackson (ENG)	Darren Campbell (ENG)	Konstantinos Kenteris (GRE)	Davide Cadoni (ITA)	Abderrahim Marchoud (MAR)	Mohamed Belasri (MAR)
1994	Liu Xiang (CHN)	Graham Beasley (ENG)	Gunther De Kie (BEL)	Andy Young (SCO)	Iván Manjon (ESP)	Miloud Abaoub (ALG)
1998	Fabrice Calligny (FRA)	Cao Xuezheng (CHN)	Mandla Nkosi (RSA)	Florent Lacasse (FRA)	Cai Jinquan (CHN)	Paul Ascani (RSA)
2002	Hank Palmer (CAN)	Hank Palmer (CAN)	Maksim Aleksandrenko (RUS)	Bonolo Maboa (RSA)	Mohamed Moustaoui (MAR)	Zolile Bitane (RSA)
2006	Funmi Sobodu (ENG)	Wilhelm van der Vyver (RSA)	Hendrik Maartens (RSA)	Mario Scapini (ITA)	Ivan Mandrykin (RUS)	Hassan Chahdi (FRA)
2009	Jordan Arthur (GBR)	Zhang Xinwei (CHN)	Marcell Deák-Nagy (HUN)	Mohamad Al-Garni (QAT) (1000 m)	—	Zhang Lei (CHN)
2013	Vitor Hugo dos Santos (BRA)	Vitor Hugo dos Santos (BRA)	Wang Wei-hsu (TPE)	Konstantin Tolokonnikov (RUS)	Abubaker Haydar Abdalla (QAT)	Enis Korkmaz (TUR)
2016	Vinicius Moraes (BRA)	Vinicius Moraes (BRA)	Cleverson Pereira Jr. (BRA)	Jeferson Santos (BRA)	Adil Mchaouri (MAR)	Ilyas Raji (MAR)

Year	110 m h	400 m h	2000 m st	5000 m walk	4 × 100 m/ Medley relay (short)	4 × 400 m/Medley relay (long)
1974	Ángel Horcajada (ESP)	—	—	—	Italy (ITA)	—
1976	Philippe Goulletquer (FRA)	—	—	—	France (FRA)	—
1978	Patrick Solal (FRA)	—	—	—	France (FRA)	—
1980	Mika Harju (FIN)	—	—	—	France (FRA)	—
1982	Paul Brice (ENG)	Ignacio Huedo (ESP)	—	Massimiliano Rossignoli (ITA)	France (FRA)	—
1984	Philippe Tourret (FRA)	Pascal Maran (FRA)	Róbert Banai (HUN)	Giovanni De Benedictis (ITA)	France (FRA)	Yugoslavia (YUG)
1986	Philippe Maymat (FRA)	David Petit (FRA)	Jonny Petrén (SWE)	Germán Nieto (ESP)	France (FRA)	England (ENG)
1988	Thierry Herbe (FRA)	Henrik Wistam (SWE)	Benito Dieguez (ESP)	Sergio Roca (ESP)	Italy (ITA)	Italy (ITA)
1990	Fredrik Lindberg (SWE)	Jean-Sébastien Dauch (FRA)	Alessandro Briana (ITA)	Michele Didoni (ITA)	England (ENG)	France (FRA)
1994	Liu Xiang (CHN)	Lambros Zevakos (GRE)	Antonio Álvarez (ESP)	Wang Yinhang (CHN)	France (FRA)	Italy (ITA)
1998	Shen Zhensheng (CHN)	Luca Bortolaso (ITA)	Máté Németh (HUN)	Douglas Connolly (AUS)	Italy (ITA)	South Africa (RSA)
2002	Bano Traoré (FRA)	L. J. van Zyl (RSA)	Vito Custodero (ITA)	—	—	Italy (ITA)
2006	Ko Wen-Ting (TPE)	Toby Ulm (ENG)	Yevgeniy Skorokhodov (RUS)	—	—	Sweden (SWE)
2009	Ivan Mach Di Palmstein (ITA)	José Reynaldo Bencosme de Leon (ITA)	Ahmed Mohamed Burhan (KSA)	—	—	Spain (ESP)
2013	Rafael Pereira de Souza Mello (BRA)	Matteo Beria (ITA)	Ahmed Abdelwahed (ITA)	—	—	Italy (ITA)
2016	Thomas Wanaverbecq (FRA)	Caio Giovane Martins (BRA)	Abderrahim Louktam (MAR)	—	India (IND)	Morocco (MAR)

=== Boys field ===
Year	High jump	Pole vault	Long jump	Triple jump	Shot put	Discus throw	Hammer throw	Javelin throw
1974	Arnaud Segond (FRA)	Denis Barboza (FRA)	José Luis Rodríguez (ESP)	—	Bruno Zecchi (ITA)	Abderrazak Ben Hassine (TUN)	—	—
1976	Werner Prenner (AUT)	Thierry Vigneron (FRA)	Michalis Rodosthenous (CYP)	Alberto Raffaelli (ITA)	Robert Gressier (FRA)	Karl Janik (FRA)	—	Arto Härkönen (FIN)
1978	Roberto Cerri (FRA)	Charles Renaud (FRA)	Waldemar Golanko (POL)	Maurizio Bellucci (ITA)	Regino Pérez (ESP)	Jari Pyykko (FIN)	—	Pierre Beaudoin (FRA)
1980	Zhu Jianhua (CHN)	Gerald Kager (AUT)	Zheng Zhujia (CHN)	Gabriele Perusi (ITA)	Francisco Fuentes (ESP)	Zhang Yingbo (CHN)	—	Tero Saviniemi (FIN)
1982	Femi Abejide (ENG)	Arto Peltoniemi (FIN)	Jan-Anders Willén (SWE)	Jan-Anders Willén (SWE)	Chris Ellis (ENG)	Pasi Heikkilä (FIN)	Pasi Heikkilä (FIN)	Roger Lakalaka (FRA)
1984	Pascal Lerus (FRA)	David Prosi (FIN)	Jesús Oliván (ESP)	Lahor Marinovic (YUG)	Jean-Philippe Revallier (FRA)	Attila Horváth (HUN)	Raphaël Piolanti (FIN)	Jari Nakki (FIN)
1986	Artur Partyka (POL)	Christophe Mattei (FRA)	René Zeman (AUT)	Stewart Faulkner (ENG)	Johan Svensson (SWE)	Petri Koskinen (FIN)	Christophe Épalle (FRA)	Petri Castren (FIN)
1988	Philippe Lami (FRA)	Jean-Michel Godard (FRA)	Maurizio Fusari (ITA)	Emanuele Cocco (ITA)	Sergio Moliner (ESP)	Malek Al-Shammari (KUW)	Laurent Aletti (FRA)	Tommi Viskari (FIN)
1990	Steve Smith (ENG)	Nick Buckfield (ENG)	Zhang Jun (CHN)	Zhang Jun (CHN)	Milan Haborák (TCH)	Evangelos Alatsatianos (GRE)	David Chaussinand (FRA)	Jani Jutila (FIN)
1994	Attila Zsivoczky (HUN)	Mathieu Boisrond (FRA)	Richard Chastan (FRA)	Colomba Fofana (FRA)	Mikko Dannback (FIN)	Yves Niaré (FRA)	Maciej Pałyszko (POL)	Harri Haatainen (FIN)
1998	Cui Kai (CHN)	Filippos Sgouros (GRE)	Leslie Djhone (FRA)	Yu Ning (CHN)	Dong Enxin (CHN)	Sun Guichuan (CHN)	Li Zhongqun (CHN)	Gerhardus Pienaar (RSA)
2002	Linus Thörnblad (SWE)	Denis Fedas (UKR)	John Thornell (AUS)	Andrew Howe (ITA)	Jakub Giża (POL)	Bartosz Ratajczak (POL)	Aleksiy Sokirskiy (UKR)	André Rautenbach (RSA)
2006	Bohdan Bondarenko (UKR)	Tomáš Ondrejko (SVK)	Nikolay Ilin (RUS)	Sheryf El-Sheryf (UKR)	Xu Zhongnan (CHN)	Mykyta Nesterenko (UKR)	Igor Sergeyev (RUS)	Kirill Kadukov (RUS)
2009	Andriy Kovalyov (UKR)	Kévin Menaldo (FRA)	Florent Szezesny (FRA)	Alexander Yurchenko (RUS)	Daniele Secci (ITA)	Michael Klatsia (CYP)	Huang Shih-Feng (TPE)	Amer Ahmad Ahmad (QAT)
2013	Filippo Lari (ITA)	Vladimir Shcherbakov (RUS)	Anatoliy Ryapolov (RUS)	Tobia Bocchi (ITA)	Sun Shuai (CHN)	Kyriakos Zotos (GRE)	Oleg Romanov (RUS)	Lee Sungming (TPE)
2016	Enes Can Bayraktaroglu (TUR)	Te-Ching Hsu (TPE)	Weslley Beraldo (BRA)	Gabriel Oliveira (BRA)	Saymon Hoffmann (BRA)	Giorgos Koniarakis (CYP)	Alencar Pereira (BRA)	Rohit Yadav (IND)

=== Girls track ===
Year	100 m	200 m	400 m	800 m	1500 m	3000 m
1974	Christiane Banq (FRA)	—	—	Gali Toyb (ISR)	—	—
1976	Esmeralda Freitas (BRA)	Marie-Reine Gross (FRA)	Elisabeth Petutschnig (AUT)	Célestine N'Drin (CIV)	Lucie Drouault (FRA)	—
1978	Véronique Desbiendras (FRA)	Helga Brüstle (AUT)	Nathalie Simon (FRA)	Gloria Pallé (ESP)	Zui Yunmei (CHN)	—
1980	Laurence Bily (FRA)	Dominique Procope (FRA)	Nevia Pistrino (ITA)	Vesna Uršic (YUG)	Gu Qin (CHN)	—
1982	Fabienne Ficher (FRA)	Lisa Goreeph (ENG)	Christine Jaunin (FRA)	Florence Giolitti (FRA)	Elise Lyon (ENG)	—
1984	Annarita Balzani (ITA)	Véronique Clachet (FRA)	Ulrike Alge (AUT)	Rossana Morabito (ITA)	Satu Levelä (FIN)	—
1986	Dagmar Holbl (AUT)	Sonia Middleton (ENG)	Ulrike Alge (AUT)	Pia Lautala (FIN)	Pia Lautala (FIN)	—
1988	Lucrécia Jardim (POR)	Lucrécia Jardim (POR)	Patricia Djaté (FRA)	Najat Ouali (MAR)	Zheng Guixia (CHN)	—
1990	Bai Liqun (CHN)	Diane Smith (ENG)	Androula Sialou (CYP)	Séverine Foulon (FRA)	Anja Smolders (BEL)	—
1994	Fabé Dia (FRA)	Susie Williams (ENG)	Miriam Mašeková (SVK)	Tytti Reho (FIN)	Xiao Guohong (CHN)	—
1998	Sandra Dufour (FRA)	Wang Guanjun (CHN)	Yang Junli (CHN)	Shi Shengda (CHN)	Tinneke Boonen (BEL)	—
2002	Aurélie Kamga (FRA)	Giulia Arcione (ITA)	Alissa Kallinikou (CYP)	Liu Qing (CHN)	Jelena Ština (LAT)	—
2006	Ashlee Nelson (ENG)	Emily Shaw (ENG)	Alexandra Štukova (SVK)	Yekaterina Zarudnaya (RUS)	Sarah Hopkinson (ENG)	—
2009	Anasztázia Nguyen (HUN)	Jennifer Galais (FRA)	Kateryna Slyusarenko (UKR)	Georgia Peel (GBR) (1000 m)	—	Emelia Gorecka (GBR)
2013	Paraskevi Andreou (CYP)	Marina Sizova (RUS)	Anastasiya Kudryavtseva (RUS)	Ekaterina Alekseeva (RUS)	Elena Paushkina (RUS)	Guan Yaxin (CHN)
2016	Marina Oliveira (BRA)	Marina Oliveira (BRA)	Janka Molnar (HUN)	Assia Nouri (MAR)	Nikoleta Kinatidoy (GRE)	Inci Kalkan (TUR)

Year	100 m h	400 m h	2000 m st	3000 m walk	4 × 100 m/Medley relay (short)	Medley relay (long)
1974	Patrizia Lombardo (ITA)	—	—	—	Italy (ITA)	
1976	Pascale Grolhier (FRA)	—	—	—	France (FRA)	
1978	Lena Spoof (FIN)	—	—	—	France (FRA)	
1980	Valérie Frehaut (FRA)	—	—	—	France (FRA)	
1982	Elisa Mosconi (ITA)	Simonetta Bellandi (ITA)	—	Helen Ringshaw (ENG)	France (FRA)	
1984	Carla Tuzzi (ITA)	Simonetta Bellandi (ITA)	—	Begoña Miranda (ESP)	France (FRA)	
1986	María José Mardomingo (ESP)	Miriam Alonso (ESP)	—	Mari Cruz Díaz (ESP)	Austria (AUT)	
1988	Regina Gabarro (ESP)	Stella Theocharous (CYP)	—	Zuo Xiaohui (CHN)	Austria (AUT)	
1990	Nathalie Ferreira (FRA)	Francesca Delon (ITA)	—	Sun Yan (CHN)	France (FRA)	
1994	Eveliina Peltola (FIN)	Annika Kumlin (FIN)	—	Jiang Guoqin (CHN)	England (ENG)	
1998	Wang Ni (CHN)	Wang Ni (CHN)	—	Liu Chang (CHN)	France (FRA)	
2002	Alice Decaux (FRA)	Chantelle Terblanche (RSA)	—	—	France (FRA)	
2006	Meng Yuan (CHN)	Irina Reshetkina (RUS)	—	—	Russia (RUS)	
2009	Mathilde Raibaut (FRA)	Lisa Elvira Celi (AUS)	Jessica Gilfillian (AUS)	—	Italy (ITA)	
2013	Natalia Christofi (CYP)	Tatiana Kiseleva (RUS)	Janaina Lima de Paulo (BRA)	—	Russia (RUS)	
2016	Micaela Mello (BRA)	Rita de Cassia Ferreira (BRA)	Ioana Stefania Ghebu (ROM)	—	Brazil (BRA)	Brazil (BRA)

=== Girls field ===
Year	High jump	Pole vault	Long jump	Triple jump	Shot put	Discus throw	Hammer throw	Javelin throw
1974	Susann Sundkvist (FIN)	—	Marie-Andrée Quinchon (FRA)	—	Verônica Brunner (BRA)	Maristella Bano (ITA)	—	—
1976	Maria Foscalla Pettoello (ITA)	—	Ewa Langwinska (POL)	—	Erja Tulikanto (FIN)	Marja-Leena Larpi (FIN)	—	Olga Verissimo (BRA)
1978	Alessandra Fossati (FRA)	—	Cristina Bobbi (ITA)	—	Sumin (CHN)	Liu (CHN)	—	Sylvie Brossier (FRA)
1980	Alessandra Fossati (FRA)	—	Solli Huotari (FIN)	—	Peng Qinyun (CHN)	Yu Hourun (CHN)	—	Laurence Czechowski (FRA)
1982	Sabine Skvara (AUT)	—	Joanne Mulliner (ENG)	—	Zhou Tianhua (CHN)	Zheng (CHN)	—	Xin Xiaoli (CHN)
1984	Isabelle Chevallier (FRA)	—	Maria Dracou (CYP)	—	Maria Tranchina (ITA)	Päivi Hämeenkorpi (FIN)	—	Fani Berberidou (GRE)
1986	Brigitte Pock (AUT)	—	Caroline Claire (FRA)	—	Päivi Salonen (FIN)	Amanda Barnes (ENG)	—	Ines Staudigl (AUT)
1988	Petra Bader (SWE)	—	Paula Silmala (FIN)	—	Minna Nousiainen (FIN)	Päivi Hautaniemi (FIN)	—	Veronica Becuzzi (ITA)
1990	Katja Kilpi (FIN)	—	Karin Högberg (SWE)	—	Marika Tuliniemi (FIN)	Gao Yuhua (CHN)	—	Ágnes Preisinger (HUN)
1994	Yuliya Lyakhova (RUS)	—	Peng Fengmei (CHN)	—	Qian Chunhua (CHN)	Liu Weiying (CHN)	—	Chu Chunxia (CHN)
1998	Gaëlle Niaré (FRA)	—	Célia Harmenil (FRA)	—	Hong Mei (CHN)	Hong Mei (CHN)	—	Yi Chunmei (CHN)
2002	Irina Kovalenko (UKR)	Miina Kentta (FIN)	Jacinta Boyd (AUS)	Olga Savenkova (LAT)	Chrysi Moisidou (GRE)	Katerina Karsak (UKR)	Natalya Zolotukhina (UKR)	Xue Juan (CHN)
2006	Serena Capponcelli (ITA)	Ekaterini Stefanidi (GRE)	Jade Surman (ENG)	Ganna Knyazyeva (UKR)	Anita Márton (HUN)	Li Wen-hua (TPE)	Adriana Papadopoulou (GRE)	Vera Rebrik (UKR)
2009	Alessia Trost (ITA)	Tatiana Stetsyuk (RUS)	Megane Beaufour (FRA)	Yana Borodina (RUS)	Shi Xuewei (CHN)	Viktoriya Klochko (UKR)	Alexia Sedykh (FRA)	Liina Laasma (EST)
2013	Sofia Voronina (RUS)	Mariia Zakharutkina (RUS)	Lea Fleury (FRA)	Nubia Aparecida Soares (BRA)	Alena Bugakova (RUS)	Alena Bugakova (RUS)	Giulia Camporese (ITA)	Hanna Tarasiuk (BLR)
2016	Eniko Kata Karpati (HUN)	Isabel Quadros (BRA)	Hui-Chi Chiang (TPE)	Mirieli Santos (BRA)	Gleice Castro (BRA)	Dimitra Alexiov (GRE)	Iliana Evangelou (CYP)	Hui-Jun Li (TPE)

== Medals ==
- Medals (1974-2016 / Only Gold)

Rank	Nation	Gold	Silver	Bronze	Total
1	France	118	0	0	118
2	Italy	70	0	0	70
3	China	56	0	0	56
4	England	46	0	0	46
5	Finland	36	0	0	36
6	Russia	35	0	0	35
7	Brazil	31	0	0	31
8	Spain	23	0	0	23
9	Hungary	15	0	0	15
10	Greece	14	0	0	14
10	Ukraine	14	0	0	14
12	Austria	13	0	0	13
13	Cyprus	12	0	0	12
13	Sweden	12	0	0	12
15	South Africa	11	0	0	11
16	Morocco	10	0	0	10
17	Chinese Taipei	8	0	0	8
18	Belgium	6	0	0	6
18	Poland	6	0	0	6
20	Australia	5	0	0	5
20	Turkey	5	0	0	5
22	Great Britain	4	0	0	4
22	Yugoslavia	4	0	0	4
24	Qatar	3	0	0	3
24	Slovakia	3	0	0	3
24	Tunisia	3	0	0	3
27	Canada	2	0	0	2
27	India	2	0	0	2
27	Latvia	2	0	0	2
27	Portugal	2	0	0	2
31	Belarus	1	0	0	1
31	Israel	1	0	0	1
31	Ivory Coast	1	0	0	1
31	Kuwait	1	0	0	1
31	Nigeria	1	0	0	1
31	Romania	1	0	0	1
31	Saudi Arabia	1	0	0	1
Totals (37 entries)		578	0	0	578

== See also ==
- International athletics championships and games
