= Annarita =

Annarita is a given name. Notable people with the given name include:

- Annarita Balzani (born 1967), Italian sprinter
- Annarita Sidoti (1969–2015), Italian race walker
- Annarita Buttafuoco (1951–1999), Italian historian

== See also ==
- Anna Rita Angotzi (born 1967), Italian former sprinter
- Anarita, place in Cyprus
