= Yugoslavia at the 1987 Mediterranean Games =

- IOC code: YUG
- NOC: Yugoslav Olympic Committee

in Latakia
- Medals Ranked 2nd: Gold 17 Silver 19 Bronze 17 Total 53

Mediterranean Games appearances (overview)
- 1951; 1955; 1959; 1963; 1967; 1971; 1975; 1979; 1983; 1987; 1991

Other related appearances
- Bosnia and Herzegovina (1993–); Croatia (1993–); Slovenia (1993–); Serbia and Montenegro (1997–2005); Montenegro (2009–); Serbia (2009–); North Macedonia (2013–); Kosovo (2018–)

Yugoslavia competed at the 1987 Mediterranean Games held in Latakia, Syria.

== Medalists ==
Medal	Name	Sport	Event
Gold	Novica Čanović	Athletics	Men's High jump
Gold	Sejad Krdžalić	Athletics	Men's Javelin throw
Gold	Slobodanka Čolović	Athletics	Women's 800m
Gold	Amra Temim	Athletics	Women's High jump
Gold	Kristina Jazbinšek	Athletics	Women's Javelin throw
Gold	Agim Ljatifi	Boxing	Light Welterweight
Gold	Vukašin Dobrašinović	Boxing	Welterweight
Gold	Damir Škaro	Boxing	Light Heavyweight
Gold	Azis Salihu	Boxing	Super Heavyweight
Gold	Mirjana Jovović	Shooting	Women's 50 meter rifle three positions
Gold	Zoran Primorac	Table tennis	Men's Singles
Gold	Ilija Lupulesku, Zoran Primorac	Table tennis	Men's Doubles
Gold	Ilija Lupulesku, Jasna Fazlić	Table tennis	Mixed Doubles
Gold	Šaban Trstena	Wrestling	Freestyle 57kg
Gold	Nandor Sabo	Wrestling	Greco-Roman 68kg
Gold	Franc Podlesek	Wrestling	Greco-Roman 74kg
Gold	Emil Trauber	Wrestling	Greco-Roman 100kg
Silver	Ismail Mačev	Athletics	Men's 400m
Silver	Jovan Lazarević	Athletics	Men's Shot put
Silver	Ivan Mustapić	Athletics	Men's Javelin throw
Silver	Goran Kabić	Athletics	Men's Decathlon
Silver	Kornelija Šinković	Athletics	Women's 100m
Silver	Kornelija Šinković	Athletics	Women's 200m
Silver	Snežana Pajkić	Athletics	Women's 800m
Silver	Biljana Petrović	Athletics	Women's High jump
Silver	Marina Mihajlova	Athletics	Women's Heptathlon
Silver	Dragan Živadinović	Boxing	Light Flyweight
Silver	Fatmir Makoli	Boxing	Light Middleweight
Silver	Slavko Stanišić	Judo	95kg
Silver	Srećko Pejović	Shooting	Men's 50 meter rifle three positions
Silver	Vesna Domazet	Shooting	Women's 50 meter rifle three positions
Silver	Jasna Fazlić	Table tennis	Women's Singles
Silver	Jasna Fazlić, Polona Frelih	Table tennis	Women's Doubles
Silver	Zoran Kalinić, Fatima Isanović	Table tennis	Mixed Doubles
Silver	Mirko Dimčevski	Wrestling	Freestyle 48kg
Silver	Abas Emini	Wrestling	Freestyle 52kg
Bronze	Saša Karan	Athletics	Men's Decathlon
Bronze	Safetin Salijevski	Boxing	Flyweight
Bronze	Afrim Majanci	Boxing	Lightweight
Bronze	Filip Leščak	Judo	78kg
Bronze	Ivan Todorov	Judo	86kg
Bronze	Dragan Kusmuk	Judo	+95kg
Bronze	Šaćir Đeko	Shooting	Men's 50 meter rifle three positions
Bronze	Nace Majcen	Swimming	Men's 100m Freestyle
Bronze	Tibor Rezmanj	Swimming	Men's 100m Butterfly
Bronze	Nace Majcen, Novak, Slaven Šitić, Đerđ Cabafi	Swimming	Men's 4×100m Freestyle
Bronze	Tanja Godina	Swimming	Women's 200m Backstroke
Bronze	Ilija Lupulesku	Table tennis	Men's Singles
Bronze	Zoran Primorac, Polona Frelih	Table tennis	Mixed Doubles
Bronze	Nusret Hamidi	Wrestling	Freestyle 62kg
Bronze	Šaban Sejdiu	Wrestling	Freestyle 74kg
Bronze	Gradimir Dedić	Wrestling	Greco-Roman 62kg
Bronze	Vladislav Kočović	Wrestling	Greco-Roman +100kg

== Medals by sport ==
Sport	Gold	Silver	Bronze	Total
Athletics	5	9	1	15
Wrestling	4	2	4	10
Boxing	4	2	2	8
Table tennis	3	3	2	8
Shooting	1	2	1	4
Judo	0	1	3	4
Swimming	0	0	4	4
Totals (7 entries)	17	19	17	53
