= Dimitros Hatzopoulos =

Greek long jumper (born 1967)

Personal information
- Born: 17 April 1967 (age 59)

Sport
- Sport: Track and field
Medal record
Representing Greece
Mediterranean Games
Gold medal – first place	1987 Latakia	Long jump
Bronze medal – third place	1997 Bari	Long jump

Dimitrios Hatzopoulos (born 17 April 1967) is a retired Greek long jumper.

He finished tenth at the 1986 World Junior Championships, eighth at the 1987 European Indoor Championships, seventh at the 1987 World Indoor Championships. He also competed at the 1987 World Championships (no mark), the 1991 World Indoor Championships, the 1994 European Championships, the 1997 World Indoor Championships, the 1997 World Championships (no mark) and the 1998 European Championships without reaching the final.

Regionally he won the 1987 Mediterranean Games, won the Balkan Championships in 1994 and took the bronze medal at the 1997 Mediterranean Games. However, he never became Greek champion, owing to the dominance of Kostas Koukodimos and Spyros Vasdekis.

His personal best jump was 8.07 metres, achieved in June 1994 in Athens. His personal best indoor was 7.99 metres.
