= 1992 European Athletics Indoor Championships – Women's 800 metres =

The women's 800 metres event at the 1992 European Athletics Indoor Championships was held in Palasport di Genova on 28, 29 February and 1 March.

== Medalists ==
Gold	Silver	Bronze
Ella Kovacs; Romania	Inna Yevseyeva; Unified Team	Yelena Afanasyeva; Unified Team

== Results ==
=== Heats ===
First 3 from each heat (Q) and the next 3 fastest (q) qualified for the semifinals.

Rank	Heat	Name	Nationality	Time	Notes
1	1	Inna Yevseyeva	Unified Team	2:02.24	Q
2	1	Carla Sacramento	Portugal	2:02.42	Q
3	1	Heike Huneke	Germany	2:02.80	Q
4	1	Stella Jongmans	Netherlands	2:03.34	q
5	1	Fabia Trabaldo	Italy	2:03.62	q
6	3	Stefania Savi	Italy	2:05.69	Q
7	3	Milena Strnadová	Czechoslovakia	2:05.93	Q
8	3	Aurelia Scalabrin	Switzerland	2:05.93	Q
9	3	Krista Aukema	Netherlands	2:05.94	q
10	2	Ella Kovacs	Romania	2:06.95	Q
11	2	Yelena Afanasyeva	Unified Team	2:07.65	Q
12	2	Nadia Falvo	Italy	2:08.35	Q
13	2	Amaia Andrés	Spain	2:08.69	
14	2	Arlene Smith	Ireland	2:08.99	
15	2	Malahat Kokalp	Turkey	2:12.02	

=== Semifinals ===
First 3 from each semifinal qualified directly (Q) for the final.

Rank	Heat	Name	Nationality	Time	Notes
1	1	Inna Yevseyeva	Unified Team	2:02.93	Q
2	1	Fabia Trabaldo	Italy	2:03.51	Q
3	1	Carla Sacramento	Portugal	2:03.78	Q
4	1	Aurelia Scalabrin	Switzerland	2:03.93	
5	2	Ella Kovacs	Romania	2:04.00	Q
6	1	Milena Strnadová	Czechoslovakia	2:04.16	
7	2	Yelena Afanasyeva	Unified Team	2:04.22	Q
8	2	Stella Jongmans	Netherlands	2:04.52	Q
9	2	Heike Huneke	Germany	2:05.37	
10	2	Nadia Falvo	Italy	2:05.94	
11	2	Stefania Savi	Italy	2:06.05	
12	1	Krista Aukema	Netherlands	2:06.30	

=== Final ===
Rank	Name	Nationality	Time	Notes
1st place, gold medalist(s)	Ella Kovacs	Romania	1:59.98	
2nd place, silver medalist(s)	Inna Yevseyeva	Unified Team	2:00.26	
3rd place, bronze medalist(s)	Yelena Afanasyeva	Unified Team	2:00.69	
4	Carla Sacramento	Portugal	2:02.90	
5	Stella Jongmans	Netherlands	2:03.50	
6	Fabia Trabaldo	Italy	2:03.70	
