= 1987 European Athletics Indoor Championships – Men's long jump =

The men's long jump event at the 1987 European Athletics Indoor Championships was held on 21 February.

== Results ==
Rank	Name	Nationality	#1	#2	#3	#4	#5	#6	Result	Notes
1st place, gold medalist(s)	Robert Emmiyan	Soviet Union	8.27	x	8.34	8.14	8.28	8.49	8.49	AR, CR
2nd place, silver medalist(s)	Giovanni Evangelisti	Italy	7.63	7.67	7.84	8.05	8.26	8.00	8.26	NR
3rd place, bronze medalist(s)	Christian Thomas	West Germany	7.44	7.84	7.96	x	7.76	8.12	8.12	
4	László Szálma	Hungary	7.60	7.78	7.93	x	8.07	8.07	8.07	
5	Norbert Brige	France	7.88	7.96	8.05	8.02	7.97	7.78	8.05	
6	Jarmo Kärnä	Finland	7.91	7.81	7.95	7.85	7.94	7.87	7.95	NR
7	Ron Beer	East Germany	x	7.87	7.78	x	x	7.77	7.87	
8	Dimitrios Hadzopoulos	Greece	7.85	7.75	x	x	x	x	7.85	NR
9	Sergey Layevskiy	Soviet Union							7.82	
10	Franck Lestage	France							7.69	
11	Jeroen Fischer	Belgium							7.62	
12	Emiel Mellaard	Netherlands							7.62	
13	Róbert Széli	Czechoslovakia							7.58	
14	Joachim Assenmacher	West Germany							7.52	
15	Thierry Delrieu	France							7.41	
16	Michael Rodosthenous	Cyprus							7.29	
	Einar Sagli	Norway							DNS	
