= Assenmacher =

Assenmacher is a surname. Notable people with the surname include:

- Joachim Assenmacher (born 1963), West German long jumper
- Karl-Josef Assenmacher (born 1947), German football referee
- Paul Assenmacher (born 1960), American baseball player
