= 1993 IAAF World Indoor Championships – Women's 800 metres =

The women's 800 metres event at the 1993 IAAF World Indoor Championships was held on 12, 13 and 14 March.

== Medalists ==
Gold	Silver	Bronze
Maria Mutola; Mozambique	Svetlana Masterkova; Russia	Joetta Clark; United States

== Results ==
=== Heats ===
First 2 of each heat (Q) and next 4 fastest (q) qualified for the semifinals.

Rank	Heat	Name	Nationality	Time	Notes
1	1	Inna Yevseyeva	Ukraine	2:01.75	Q
2	1	Joetta Clark	United States	2:01.84	Q
3	3	Svetlana Masterkova	Russia	2:02.50	Q
4	3	Maria Mutola	Mozambique	2:02.74	Q
5	3	Rita Paulavičienė	Lithuania	2:03.01	q
6	2	Ella Kovacs	Romania	2:03.46	Q
7	1	Elsa Amaral	Portugal	2:03.66	q
8	1	Amaia Andrés	Spain	2:03.76	q, PB
9	2	Yelena Afanasyeva	Russia	2:03.79	Q
10	2	Dalia Matusevičienė	Lithuania	2:04.05	q
11	2	Edith Nakiyingi	Uganda	2:04.88	
12	1	Lynn Gibson	Great Britain	2:05.15	
13	4	Yelena Storchovaya	Ukraine	2:06.87	Q
14	4	Mitica Constantin	Romania	2:07.46	Q
15	2	Eduarda Coelho	Portugal	2:07.51	
16	4	Heike Huneke	Germany	2:08.02	
17	4	Jane Brooker	United States	2:08.04	
18	4	Jacqui Parker	Great Britain	2:09.99	
	3	Stella Jongmans	Netherlands	DQ	

=== Semifinals ===
First 2 of each semifinal (Q) and the next 2 fastest (q) qualified for the final.

Rank	Heat	Name	Nationality	Time	Notes
1	1	Maria Mutola	Mozambique	2:00.65	Q, AR
2	1	Ella Kovacs	Romania	2:00.79	Q
3	1	Yelena Afanasyeva	Russia	2:01.20	q
4	1	Yelena Storchovaya	Ukraine	2:01.57	q
5	1	Dalia Matusevičienė	Lithuania	2:02.17	
6	2	Svetlana Masterkova	Russia	2:03.13	Q
7	2	Joetta Clark	United States	2:03.25	Q
8	2	Inna Yevseyeva	Ukraine	2:03.97	
9	2	Rita Paulavičienė	Lithuania	2:03.98	
10	1	Amaia Andrés	Spain	2:05.13	
11	2	Mitica Constantin	Romania	2:05.67	
12	2	Elsa Amaral	Portugal	2:09.52	

=== Final ===
Rank	Name	Nationality	Time	Notes
1st place, gold medalist(s)	Maria Mutola	Mozambique	1:57.55	CR, AR
2nd place, silver medalist(s)	Svetlana Masterkova	Russia	1:59.18	NR
3rd place, bronze medalist(s)	Joetta Clark	United States	1:59.18	PB
4	Yelena Afanasyeva	Russia	2:01.87	
5	Ella Kovacs	Romania	2:02.35	
6	Yelena Storchovaya	Ukraine	2:03.08	
