= Athletics at the 1989 Summer Universiade – Women's 800 metres =

International athletics championship event

The women's 800 metres event at the 1989 Summer Universiade was held at the Wedaustadion in Duisburg on 29 and 30 August 1989.

== Medalists ==
Gold	Silver	Bronze
Ana Fidelia Quirot; Cuba	Ellen van Langen; Netherlands	Inna Yevseyeva; Soviet Union

== Results ==
=== Heats ===
Held on 29 August

Rank	Heat	Athlete	Nationality	Time	Notes
1	3	Inna Yevseyeva	Soviet Union	2:07.20	Q
2	3	Gabriela Sedláková	Czechoslovakia	2:07.38	Q
3	3	Nicoletta Tozzi	Italy	2:07.61	Q
4	3	Debbie Marshall	United States	2:07.99	Q
5	2	Ana Fidelia Quirot	Cuba	2:08.15	Q
6	2	Gabi Lesch	West Germany	2:08.41	Q
7	3	Barbara Gourdet	France	2:08.47	Q
8	2	Lynne Robinson	Great Britain	2:09.89	Q
9	1	Ellen van Langen	Netherlands	2:12.00	Q
10	1	Nadezhda Loboyko	Soviet Union	2:12.07	Q
11	1	Sharon Stewart	Australia	2:12.16	Q
12	1	Ella Kovacs	Romania	2:12.27	Q
13	1	Meredith Rainey	United States	2:13.28	Q
14	1	Nicki Knapp	Canada	2:13.31	q
15	2	Mao Yujie	China	2:14.86	Q
16	2	Nancy Mathea	Kenya	2:14.86	Q
17	2	Wang Hsin-hsin	Chinese Taipei	2:37.04	
17	2	Woo Chui Ying	Hong Kong	2:37.04	
19	3	Oumou Doumbouya	Guinea	2:42.30	

=== Semifinals ===
Held on 29 August

Rank	Heat	Athlete	Nationality	Time	Notes
1	1	Ana Fidelia Quirot	Cuba	2:03.45	Q
2	2	Gabi Lesch	West Germany	2:03.46	Q
3	1	Inna Yevseyeva	Soviet Union	2:03.62	Q
4	2	Nadezhda Loboyko	Soviet Union	2:03.66	Q
5	2	Gabriela Sedláková	Czechoslovakia	2:03.67	Q
6	1	Ellen van Langen	Netherlands	2:03.70	Q
7	2	Nicoletta Tozzi	Italy	2:03.87	q
8	2	Meredith Rainey	United States	2:04.15	q
9	2	Barbara Gourdet	France	2:04.50	
10	1	Lynne Robinson	Great Britain	2:04.63	
11	1	Debbie Marshall	United States	2:04.91	
12	2	Nicki Knapp	Canada	2:05.54	
13	1	Ella Kovacs	Romania	2:06.03	
14	1	Mao Yujie	China	2:10.96	
15	1	Nancy Mathea	Kenya	2:15.71	
	2	Sharon Stewart	Australia	DNF	

=== Final ===
Held on 30 August

Rank	Athlete	Nationality	Time	Notes
1st place, gold medalist(s)	Ana Fidelia Quirot	Cuba	1:58.88	
2nd place, silver medalist(s)	Ellen van Langen	Netherlands	1:59.82	
3rd place, bronze medalist(s)	Inna Yevseyeva	Soviet Union	2:01.03	
4	Gabi Lesch	West Germany	2:01.46	
5	Nadezhda Loboyko	Soviet Union	2:02.28	
6	Gabriela Sedláková	Czechoslovakia	2:03.01	
7	Nicoletta Tozzi	Italy	2:03.24	
8	Meredith Rainey	United States	2:04.55	
