= Athletics at the 1991 Summer Universiade – Women's 800 metres =

The women's 800 metres event at the 1991 Summer Universiade was held at the Don Valley Stadium in Sheffield on 20, 21 and 22 July 1991.

== Medalists ==
Gold	Silver	Bronze
Inna Yevseyeva; Soviet Union	Gabi Lesch; Germany	Jasmin Jones; United States

== Results ==
=== Heats ===
Rank	Heat	Athlete	Nationality	Time	Notes
1	2	Gabi Lesch	Germany	2:07.29	Q
2	2	Edith Nakiyingi	Uganda	2:07.53	Q
3	2	Elsa Amaral	Portugal	2:07.56	Q
4	2	Mireille Sankaatsing	Suriname	2:07.68	q
5	1	Jasmin Jones	United States	2:07.71	Q
6	1	Gabriela Sedláková	Czechoslovakia	2:07.76	Q
7	1	Qu Yunxia	China	2:07.87	Q
8	1	Cătălina Gheorghiu	Romania	2:07.91	q
9	4	Nicoletta Tozzi	Italy	2:07.94	Q
10	4	Nicole Masil	Canada	2:07.98	Q
11	4	Michelle Bennett	United States	2:08.18	Q
12	4	Yelena Goncharova	Soviet Union	2:08.58	q
13	3	Inna Yevseyeva	Soviet Union	2:08.74	Q
14	2	Natalie Tait	Great Britain	2:08.83	q
15	3	Mary Kitson	Great Britain	2:09.45	Q
16	3	Eduarda Coelho	Portugal	2:09.71	Q
17	3	Patrizia Morreale	Italy	2:10.07	
18	3	Ester Sumah	Indonesia	2:11.60	
19	4	Lin Shu-huei	Chinese Taipei	2:12.38	
20	4	Una English	Ireland	2:16.24	
21	4	Nancy Mathea	Kenya	2:20.69	
22	3	Mirta Jackson	Costa Rica	2:20.99	
23	1	Betty Siyani	Malawi	3:08.31	

=== Semifinals ===
Rank	Heat	Athlete	Nationality	Time	Notes
1	1	Inna Yevseyeva	Soviet Union	2:01.16	Q
2	1	Mary Kitson	Great Britain	2:02.83	Q
3	1	Cătălina Gheorghiu	Romania	2:02.90	Q
4	1	Jasmin Jones	United States	2:03.40	Q
5	1	Elsa Amaral	Portugal	2:03.71	
6	2	Gabi Lesch	Germany	2:03.92	Q
7	2	Nicoletta Tozzi	Italy	2:04.71	Q
8	2	Edith Nakiyingi	Uganda	2:04.75	Q
9	2	Michelle Bennett	United States	2:04.86	Q
10	1	Mireille Sankaatsing	Suriname	2:04.92	
11	2	Yelena Goncharova	Soviet Union	2:05.15	
12	2	Nicole Masil	Canada	2:05.38	
13	2	Qu Yunxia	China	2:05.73	
14	1	Eduarda Coelho	Portugal	2:06.43	
15	1	Gabriela Sedláková	Czechoslovakia	2:08.21	
16	2	Natalie Tait	Great Britain	2:09.24	

=== Final ===
Rank	Athlete	Nationality	Time	Notes
1st place, gold medalist(s)	Inna Yevseyeva	Soviet Union	1:59.80	
2nd place, silver medalist(s)	Gabi Lesch	Germany	2:00.97	
3rd place, bronze medalist(s)	Jasmin Jones	United States	2:02.00	
4	Edith Nakiyingi	Uganda	2:02.22	
5	Mary Kitson	Great Britain	2:04.36	
6	Cătălina Gheorghiu	Romania	2:04.80	
7	Michelle Bennett	United States	2:05.09	
8	Nicoletta Tozzi	Italy	2:08.94	
