= Nevia Pistrino =

Italian sprinter

== Biography ==
Nevia Pistrino
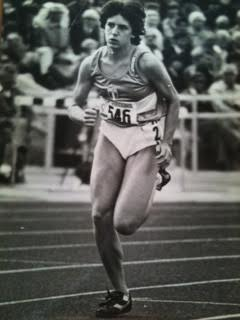
- 1981 European Athletics Junior Championships

Personal information
- National team: Italy: 10 (1981-1987)
- Born: 18 October 1964 (age 61) Udine, Italy
- Height: 1.60 cm (1 in)
- Weight: 48 Kg

Sport
- Sport: Athletics
- Event: 400 metres
- Club: Libertas Gonars (1975/1977), Snia Friuli Torviscosa (1978/1982), Snia Milano (1983/1985), Libertas Udine (1986/1992)
- Coached by: Rosario Bisesi (1975/1982), Edmondo Codarini(1983/1987, Franco Colle(1988/1992)

Achievements and titles
- Personal best: 54.01
Medal record
Mediterranean Games
Gold medal – first place	1987 Latakia	4x400 m relay
Gymnasiade
Gold medal – first place	1980 Turin	400 metres

1987 Mediterran Games gold medal 4x400 m

Nevia Pistrino (born 18 October 1964) is an Italian retired sprinter.

She was introduced to athletics by her middle school physical education teacher, starting with cross-country running at the age of 11 before soon switching to sprinting, following in the footsteps of her hurdler sister, Morena. Her first three years as an athlete were extraordinary. As a youth (allieva), she won the 400 meters at the Italian category championships for two consecutive years, and in 1980, she won the 'Gymnasiade in Turin'. At fifteen, she was already a junior national team athlete, and at sixteen, her time of 54.65 in the single-lap race set an Italian youth record, ranking as the fifth-fastest overall time in Italy. In her first year as a junior in 1981, not yet seventeen years old, her progress was even more substantial: she achieved the fourth-fastest overall time in Italy and won the bronze medal at the Italian Senior Championships in Turin. These performances earned her a spot on the senior national team. In the European Cup semifinal in Bodø, Sweden, she was selected for the starting lineup and finished sixth with a personal best of 54.23. That same year, she represented Italy again in the European Cup B Final in Pescara and at the World Cup in Rome. Her youth record stood as the Junior Italian record for many years, and even longer-lasting was her 38.6-second mark set in Rieti, also in 1981, in the non-Olympic 300-meter event. In 1982, she confirmed her status as an athlete of national interest by winning the silver medal at the Italian Championships in Rome.After a rather serious injury, a torn hamstring, her career was put on hold for a few years. However, she returned as a key competitor in 1986, winning bronze at the Italian Championships in Turin. In 1987, she competed again in the European Cup in Gothenburg with the 4x400-meter relay, took part in the World Championships in Rome, and participated in the Mediterranean Games in Latakia, where the team won gold. The following year, in 1988, she achieved a new personal best of 54.01.

== Career ==
During her career she participated at the 1980 Gymnasiade, 1981 European Cup (athletics), 1981 European Athletics Junior Championships, 1981 IAAF World Cup, 1987 European Cup (athletics), 1987 Mediterranean Games and 1987 World Championships in Athletics.

== National records ==
- Women's 4 × 400 metres relay Pescara 1981 3:34.69
- Women's 4 × 400 metres relay Palermo 1981 3:33.53
- 300 metres Juniores Rieti 1981 38.6 manual (lasted until 2018)
- 400 metres under 18yo 54.23
- 1.000 metres 'Ragazze 12yo' Udine 21.5.77 3'06”7

== Progression 400 meters ==
- 1979 14yo 55.88
- 1980 15yo 54.65
- 1981 16yo 54.23
- 1987 22yo 54.20
- 1988 23yo 54.01

== Achievements ==
Year	Competition	Venue	Rank	Event	Time	Notes
1980	Gymnasiade	(Italy) Turin	1	400 m	55.46	
1981	World Cup	(Italy) Rome	6	4x400 m relay	3:36.50	
1981	European Junior Championships	(Netherlands) Utrecht	5	400 m	55.03	
1987	Mediterranean Games	(Syria) Latakia	1	4x400 m relay	3:32.14	
1987	World Championships	(Italy) Rome	Semi	4x400 m relay	3:31.72	
