= Pavlina Evro =

Albanian distance runner (born 1965)

Pavlina Evro (born 22 January 1965) is a retired Albanian mid-distance and long-distance runner athlete.

Born in Korçë, Albania she specialized in the mid-distances of 800m and 1500m. She is the most famous Albanian athlete for her extraordinary results. She was champion of Albania and is still the record holder for those specialties in Albania after 26 years.

Evro will be remembered internationally for having ranked first place in the 1500 meter race at the "Grand Prix" International Athletic Meeting in Nice, France in 1984 and for winning a bronze medal in the 1500 metres at the 1987 Mediterranean Games in Latakia, Syria.
