= Elsa Amaral =

Portuguese middle-distance runner

Personal information
- Full name: Elsa Maria Meireles Amaral
- Born: 31 May 1966 (age 60) Porto, Portugal
- Height: 1.68 m (5 ft 6 in)
- Weight: 59 kg (130 lb)

Sport
- Sport: Athletics
- Event: 800 m
- Club: FC Porto

Elsa Maria Meireles Amaral (born 31 May 1966 in Porto) is a retired Portuguese middle-distance runner who competed primarily in the 800 metres. She represented her country at the 1992 Summer Olympics, as well as two outdoor and two indoor World Championships.

== Competition record ==
Year	Competition	Venue	Position	Event	Notes
Representing Portugal
1990	European Indoor Championships	Glasgow, United Kingdom	13th (h)	800 m	2:11.66
1990	Ibero-American Championships	Manaus, Brazil	4th	400 m	54.32
1990	Ibero-American Championships	Manaus, Brazil	3rd	800 m	2:03.57
1990	European Championships	Split, Yugoslavia	11th (sf)	800 m	2:01.49
1991	Universiade	Sheffield, United Kingdom	5th (sf)	800 m	2:03.71
1991	World Championships	Tokyo, Japan	21st (h)	800 m	2:03.83
1992	Ibero-American Championships	Seville, Spain	3rd	800 m	2:02.75
1992	Olympic Games	Barcelona, Spain	8th	4 × 400 m relay	3:36.85
1993	World Indoor Championships	Toronto, Canada	12th (sf)	800 m	2:09.52
1993	Universiade	Buffalo, United States	11th (h)	800 m	2:07.76
1993	Universiade	Buffalo, United States	5th	4 × 400 m relay	3:37.47
1993	World Championships	Stuttgart, Germany	11th (h)	4 × 400 m relay	3:34.76
1995	World Indoor Championships	Barcelona, Spain	11th (h)	800 m	2:08.03

== Personal bests ==
Outdoor

- 400 metres – 53.59 (1991)
- 800 metres – 2:01.21 (Split 1990)

Indoor

- 800 metres – 2:02.51 (Sindelfingen 1993)
- 1000 metres – 2:47.11 (Moscow 1996)
