= Edith Nakiyingi =

Ugandan middle-distance runner

Personal information
- Born: 15 October 1968 (age 57)
- Height: 1.68 m (5 ft 6 in)
- Weight: 51 kg (112 lb)

Sport
- Country: Uganda
- Sport: Athletics
- Events: 800 m, 1500 m
- College team: Iowa State Cyclones
Medal record
Women's athletics
Representing Uganda
All-Africa Games
Silver medal – second place	1987 Nairobi	4x400 m relay
African Championships
Silver medal – second place	1990 Cairo	800 m
Silver medal – second place	1990 Cairo	1500 m

Edith Nakiyingi (born 15 October 1968) is a retired Ugandan middle-distance runner who competed primarily in the 800 metres. She represented her country at the 1992 Summer Olympics as well as two outdoor and one indoor World Championships.

== College career ==
Nakiyingi competed as an athlete in both cross country and track & field as Iowa State. She finished her career a two-time NCAA champion, seven-time All-American, 11-time Big Eight champion, and the 1992 Big Eight Athlete of the Year.

She captured her first NCAA track & field title in 1989, winning the 800-meter run in an NCAA meet record of 2:05.68. That season, Nakiyingi won two Big Eight indoor titles, the 1,000-meter and distance medley relay and the 800-meter run in outdoor competition. Nakiyingi again won the NCAA 800-meter indoor title in 1991 in Indianapolis with a time of 2:04.84. At the conclusion of Nakiyingi's career, she owned three of the four fastest 800-meter times in NCAA indoor meet history.

In cross country she finished 15th at the 1989 NCAA Championships and then lead ISU to the 1990 Big Eight Conference cross country title.

In 2001 she was inducted into the Iowa State Cyclones Hall of Fame.

== Competition record ==
Year	Competition	Venue	Position	Event	Notes
Representing Uganda
1987	All-Africa Games	Nairobi, Kenya	2nd	4x400 m relay	3:34.41
1990	African Championships	Cairo, Egypt	2nd	800 m	2:14.00
1990	African Championships	Cairo, Egypt	2nd	1500 m	4:25.34
1991	Universiade	Sheffield, United Kingdom	4th	800 m	2:02.22
1991	Universiade	Sheffield, United Kingdom	13th (h)	1500 m	4:17.31
1991	World Championships	Tokyo, Japan	29th (h)	800 m	2:08.72
1991	World Championships	Tokyo, Japan	35th (h)	1500 m	4:25.43
1992	Olympic Games	Barcelona, Spain	27th (h)	800 m	2:03.55
1993	World Indoor Championships	Toronto, Canada	11th (h)	800 m	2:04.88
1993	World Championships	Stuttgart, Germany	28th (h)	800 m	2:07.81

== Personal bests ==
Surface	Event	Time	Date	Place
Outdoor	800 m	2:00.88	July 7, 1990	Formia, Italy
Outdoor	1500 m	4:16.58	July 18, 1990	Bologna, Italy
Outdoor	400 m hurdles	1:01.00	March 12, 1985	Kampala, Uganda
Indoor	800 m	2:04.88	1993	Toronto, Canada
