= Athletics at the 1991 Summer Universiade – Women's 1500 metres =

The women's 1500 metres event at the 1991 Summer Universiade was held at the Don Valley Stadium in Sheffield on 24 and 25 July 1991.

== Medalists ==
Gold	Silver	Bronze
Sonia O'Sullivan; Ireland	Iulia Besliu; Romania	Qu Yunxia; China

== Results ==
=== Heats ===
Rank	Heat	Athlete	Nationality	Time	Notes
1	2	Qu Yunxia	China	4:07.71	Q, AR
2	2	Sarah Collins	Australia	4:12.01	Q
3	2	Iulia Besliu	Romania	4:13.09	Q
4	2	Katje Hoffman	Germany	4:13.13	Q
5	2	Lynne Robinson	Great Britain	4:13.67	Q
6	1	Sonia O'Sullivan	Ireland	4:14.92	Q
7	1	Lyudmila Borisova	Soviet Union	4:15.60	Q
8	1	Tuuli Merikoski-Silius	Finland	4:15.93	Q
9	1	Christine Toonstra	Netherlands	4:16.05	Q
10	1	Elisa Rea	Italy	4:16.41	Q
11	1	Heike Oehme	Germany	4:16.42	q
12	1	Darcy Arreola	United States	4:16.96	q
13	1	Edith Nakiyingi	Uganda	4:17.31	
14	2	Geraldine Hendricken	Ireland	4:19.35	
15	1	Simona Staicu	Romania	4:20.44	
16	2	Stephanie Best	United States	4:20.49	
17	1	Andrea Sollárová	Czechoslovakia	4:21.01	
18	2	Patrizia Morreale	Italy	4:22.82	
19	2	Yelena Storchovaya	Soviet Union	4:24.40	
20	1	Maxine Newman	Great Britain	4:24.49	
21	1	Mireille Sankaatsing	Suriname	4:27.54	
22	2	Marcelina Piran	Indonesia	4:58.43	

=== Final ===
Rank	Athlete	Nationality	Time	Notes
1st place, gold medalist(s)	Sonia O'Sullivan	Ireland	4:12.14	
2nd place, silver medalist(s)	Iulia Besliu	Romania	4:12.24	
3rd place, bronze medalist(s)	Qu Yunxia	China	4:12.43	
4	Sarah Collins	Australia	4:12.60	
5	Lyudmila Borisova	Soviet Union	4:12.80	
6	Lynne Robinson	Great Britain	4:13.40	PB
7	Katje Hoffmann	Germany	4:14.55	
8	Heike Oehme	Germany	4:14.64	
9	Christine Toonstra	Netherlands	4:14.93	
10	Tuuli Merikoski-Silius	Finland	4:15.60	
11	Elisa Rea	Italy	4:16.22	
12	Darcy Arreola	United States	4:16.97	
