= Ajet Toska =

Albanian hammer thrower (born 1961)

Ajet Toska (born 11 February 1961) is a retired Albanian hammer thrower.

He won the silver medal at the 1987 Mediterranean Games. He also competed at the 1991 World Championships without reaching the final.

His personal best throw was 75.92 metres, achieved in August 1986 in Tirana.
