= Athletics at the 1993 Summer Universiade – Women's 800 metres =

The women's 800 metres event at the 1993 Summer Universiade was held at the UB Stadium in Buffalo, United States on 15 and 16 July 1993.

== Medalists ==
Gold	Silver	Bronze
Amy Wickus; United States	Inez Turner; Jamaica	Daniela Antipov; Romania

== Results ==
=== Heats ===
Rank	Heat	Athlete	Nationality	Time	Notes
1	2	Petya Strashilova	Bulgaria	2:03.80	Q
2	2	Daniela Antipov	Romania	2:??.??	Q
3	2	Nicoletta Tozzi	Italy	2:04.15	q
4	2	Joanna Latimer	Great Britain	2:04.81	q
5	1	Inez Turner	Jamaica	2:05.37	Q
6	2	Sarah Renk	United States	2:05.73	
7	1	Eduarda Coelho	Portugal	2:06.45	Q
8	3	Amy Wickus	United States	2:07.37	Q
9	1	Paula Fryer	Great Britain	2:07.66	
10	3	Natalya Zaytseva	Russia	2:07.75	Q
11	3	Elsa Amaral	Portugal	2:07.76	
12	1	Emma James	New Zealand	2:09.15	
13	3	Mireille Sankaatsing	Suriname	2:09.90	
14	2	Kari Uglem	Norway	2:10.44	
15	3	Eva García	Suriname	2:12.04	
16	3	Charlene Neptune	Trinidad and Tobago	2:14.17	
17	3	K. Mathews Beenamol	India	2:14.81	
18	1	Shirley Cespedes	Costa Rica	2:16.93	
19	2	Davaadorj Tsendsuren	Mongolia	2:21.05	
20	1	Flossie Siyani	Malawi	2:40.50	

=== Final ===
Rank	Athlete	Nationality	Time	Notes
1st place, gold medalist(s)	Amy Wickus	United States	2:03.72	
2nd place, silver medalist(s)	Inez Turner	Jamaica	2:04.14	
3rd place, bronze medalist(s)	Daniela Antipov	Romania	2:04.75	
4	Petya Strashilova	Bulgaria	2:04.78	
5	Joanna Latimer	Great Britain	2:05.23	
6	Nicoletta Tozzi	Italy	2:05.48	
7	Eduarda Coelho	Portugal	2:07.63	
8	Natalya Zaytseva	Russia	2:08.09	
