= Amaia Andrés =

Spanish middle-distance runner (born 1966)

Personal information
- Born: 26 June 1966 (age 60) San Sebastián, Spain
- Height: 1.65 m (5 ft 5 in)
- Weight: 52 kg (115 lb)

Sport
- Sport: Athletics
- Event: 800 m

Amaia Andrés Berakoetxea (born 26 June 1966 in San Sebastián) is a retired Spanish middle-distance runner who competed primarily in the 800 metres. She represented her country at the 1992 Summer Olympics, and twice at both the IAAF World Indoor Championships and European Athletics Indoor Championships. She won two bronze medals at the Mediterranean Games, in the 4 × 400 metres relay in the 1991 and the 800 m in 1993.

She holds personal bests of 2:02.67 minutes for the 800 metres and 4:25.05 for the 1500 metres. She retired from competition after 1996. She was a seven-time national champion in the 800 m, six times outdoors and once indoors.

== International competitions ==
Representing Spain
Year	Competition	Venue	Position	Event	Result	Notes
1986	European Indoor Championships	Madrid, Spain	8th (h)	800 m	2:08.58	
1991	Mediterranean Games	Athens, Greece	5th	800 m	2:03.65	
1991	Mediterranean Games	Athens, Greece	3rd	4 × 400 m relay	3:34.21	
1992	European Indoor Championships	Genoa, Italy	13th (h)	800 m	2:08.69	
1992	Ibero-American Championships	Seville, Spain	4th	800 m	2:03.25	
1992	Olympic Games	Barcelona, Spain	24th (h)	800 m	2:02.67	
1993	World Indoor Championships	Toronto, Canada	10th (sf)	800 m	2:05.13	
1993	Mediterranean Games	Narbonne, France	3rd	800 m	2:05.16	
1994	European Indoor Championships	Paris, France	9th (h)	800 m	2:05.60	
1995	World Indoor Championships	Barcelona, Spain	10th (sf)	800 m	2:06.20	

== National titles ==
- Spanish Athletics Championships
  - 800 metres: 1986, 1991, 1992, 1993, 1994, 1995
- Spanish Indoor Athletics Championships
  - 800 metres: 1993

== Personal bests ==
Outdoor

- 800 metres – 2:02.67 (Barcelona 1992)
- 1500 metres – 4:25.05 (Seville 1993)

Indoor

- 800 metres – 2:03.76 (Toronto 1993)
- 1000 metres – 2:42.51 (Madrid 1994)
