= 1995 IAAF World Indoor Championships – Women's 800 metres =

The women's 800 metres event at the 1995 IAAF World Indoor Championships was held on 10–12 March 1995.

The winning margin was 2.17 seconds which as of July 2024 remains the only time the women's 800 metres was won by more than two seconds at these championships.

== Medalists ==
Gold	Silver	Bronze
Maria Mutola; Mozambique	Yelena Afanasyeva; Russia	Letitia Vriesde; Suriname

== Results ==
=== Heats ===
First three of each heat (Q) and next three fastest (q) qualified for the semifinals.

Rank	Heat	Name	Nationality	Time	Notes
1	2	Patricia Djaté-Taillard	France	2:04.09	Q
2	2	Stella Jongmans	Netherlands	2:04.30	Q
3	2	Irina Samorokova	Russia	2:04.47	Q
4	2	Inez Turner	Jamaica	2:04.65	q
5	3	Maria Mutola	Mozambique	2:05.15	Q
6	2	Andrea Šuldesová	Czech Republic	2:05.49	q
7	3	Ludmila Formanová	Czech Republic	2:06.32	Q
8	3	Amaia Andrés	Spain	2:06.82	Q
9	2	Tina Paulino	Mozambique	2:06.95	q
10	3	Abigail Hunte	Great Britain	2:07.82	
11	3	Elsa Amaral	Portugal	2:08.03	
12	1	Letitia Vriesde	Suriname	2:09.15	Q
13	1	Yelena Afanasyeva	Russia	2:09.41	Q
14	1	Petya Strashilova	Bulgaria	2:09.58	Q
15	1	Nekita Beasley	United States	2:10.62	
16	1	Rosa Evora	El Salvador	2:20.47	
17	1	Myadagmaa Otgontuya	Mongolia	2:20.68	

=== Semifinals ===
First 3 of each semifinal qualified directly (Q) for the final.

Rank	Heat	Name	Nationality	Time	Notes
1	2	Maria Mutola	Mozambique	2:03.28	Q
2	2	Yelena Afanasyeva	Russia	2:04.12	Q
3	2	Stella Jongmans	Netherlands	2:04.35	Q
4	2	Patricia Djaté-Taillard	France	2:05.14	
5	1	Letitia Vriesde	Suriname	2:05.18	Q
6	2	Petya Strashilova	Bulgaria	2:05.40	
7	1	Inez Turner	Jamaica	2:05.46	Q
8	1	Irina Samorokova	Russia	2:05.49	Q
9	1	Ludmila Formanová	Czech Republic	2:05.60	
10	1	Amaia Andrés	Spain	2:06.20	
11	2	Andrea Šuldesová	Czech Republic	2:07.25	
	1	Tina Paulino	Mozambique	DNS	

=== Final ===
Rank	Name	Nationality	Time	Notes
1st place, gold medalist(s)	Maria Mutola	Mozambique	1:57.62	
2nd place, silver medalist(s)	Yelena Afanasyeva	Russia	1:59.79	
3rd place, bronze medalist(s)	Letitia Vriesde	Suriname	2:00.36	
4	Irina Samorokova	Russia	2:00.43	
5	Stella Jongmans	Netherlands	2:01.14	
6	Inez Turner	Jamaica	2:02.00	
