= Valérie Hanicque =

French athlete

Personal information
- Nationality: France
- Born: 16 February 1964 (age 62) Cambrai

Sport
- Event(s): shot put, discus throw, Hammer throw

Valerie Hanicque (born 16 February 1964, at Cambrai) is a former French athlete, who specialised in the shot put and the discus throw.

She won the French national title in the shot put (15.84 m) and the discus (55.22 m) at the 1988 French Athletics Championships .

Selected eleven times for France national athletic teams, her personal best is 16.68 m in the Shot Put (1989) 57.56 m in the discus (1989) and 47.40 meters in the hammer throw.
