= Georgia Zouganeli =

Greek sprinter

Personal information
- Nationality: Greek
- Born: 5 March 1966 (age 59) Athens, Kingdom of Greece

Sport
- Sport: Sprinting
- Event: 4 × 100 metres relay

Georgia Zouganeli (born 5 March 1966) is a Greek sprinter. She competed in the women's 4 × 100 metres relay at the 1988 Summer Olympics.
