= Marina Skordi =

Greek sprinter

Personal information
- Nationality: Greek
- Born: 16 May 1962 (age 64) Arta, Greece

Sport
- Sport: Sprinting
- Event: 200 metres

Marina Skordi (born 16 May 1962) is a Greek sprinter. She competed in the women's 200 metres at the 1988 Summer Olympics.
