= Andrea Montanari =

Italian sprinter

Personal information
- Nationality: Italian
- Born: August 10, 1965 (age 60) Ravenna, Italy

Sport
- Country: Italy
- Sport: Athletics
- Event: 400 metres

Achievements and titles
- Personal best: 400 m: 46.16 (1993)
Medal record
Mediterranean Games
Gold medal – first place	1987 Latakia	4x400 metres relay

Andrea Montanari (born 10 August 1965) is a retired Italian sprinter who specialized in the 400 metres. He won one medal, at senior level, at the International athletics competitions.

== Biography ==
He finished fourth in the 4 × 400 m relay at the 1990 European Championships, with teammates Vito Petrella, Roberto Ribaud and Andrea Nuti. His personal best time is 46.16 seconds, achieved in August 1993 in Bologna. He has 14 caps in national team from 1987 to 1993.

== National titles ==
Andrea Montanari has won one time the individual national championship.

- 1 win in the 400 metres (1989)

== See also ==
- Italy national relay team
