= Angelo Locci =

Italian hurdler

Personal information
- Nationality: Italian
- Born: 21 December 1962 (age 63) Cagliari

Sport
- Country: Italy
- Sport: Athletics
- Event: 400 metres hurdles
- Club: Esperia Cagliari; G.S. Fiamme Azzurre

Achievements and titles
- Personal best: 400 m hs: 50.18 (1987)
Medal record
Mediterranean Games
Bronze medal – third place	1987 Latakia	400 m hs

Angelo Locci (born 21 December 1962) is an Italian male retired hurdler, which participated at the 1987 World Championships in Athletics.

== Achievements ==
Year	Competition	Venue	Position	Event	Performance	Notes
1987	World Championships	(Italy) Rome	Quarter	400 metres hurdles	51.15	
1987	Mediterranean Games	(Syria) Latakia	3rd	400 metres hurdles	51.05	
