= Nathalie Simon =

French athlete (born 1962)

Personal information
- Nationality: France
- Born: 14 April 1962 (age 63) Le Petit-Quevilly, France
- Height: 1.71 m (5 ft 7 in)

Sport
- Event: 400 m
- Club: Racing Club de France

Nathalie Simon-Chevallier (French pronunciation: [natali simɔ̃]; born 14 April 1962) is a French former athlete, who specialised in the 400 metres.

== Biography ==
Champion of France 400 meters in 1986 she was seventh in the 4 × 400 m relay at the 1987 World Championships, at Rome. She participated in the following year in the 1988 Seoul Olympics. Eliminated in the 400m heats, she took seventh in the 4 × 400 m relay.

In 1987, she won the gold medal in the 400m at Mediterranean Games at Latakia, Syria.

=== prize list ===
- French Championships in Athletics :
  - winner of the 400m 1986

=== Records ===
personal records
Event	Performance	Location	Date
400 m	52.05s		1987
