= Barbara Gourdet =

French middle-distance runner

Personal information
- Other names: Barbara Aknin; Barbara Le Guillou
- Born: 29 December 1965 (age 60) Saintes, France
- Years active: 1987-1993
- Height: 168 cm (5 ft 6 in)
- Weight: 56 kg (123 lb)

Sport
- Country: France
- Sport: Athletics
- Event: 800 metres
Medal record
Representing France
Mediterranean Games
Silver medal – second place	1987 Latakia	4x400m relay

Barbara Gourdet (born 29 December 1965) is a French former middle-distance runner, who specialized in the 800 metres.

== Biography ==
She won three French National 800m championships in 1987, 1988 and 1993.

=== Results ===
- French Championships in Athletics :
  - 3 times winner of 800 m in 1987, 1988 and 1993.

=== Records ===
Personal Bests
Event	Performance	Location	Date
800 m	2:01.31		1988
