= Boxing at the 1987 Mediterranean Games =

Boxing competition

- Location: Latakia, Syria
- Dates: 16–22 September 1987
- Competitors: 74

Boxing was one of the sports held at the 1987 Mediterranean Games.

== Medalists ==
Event	Gold	Silver	Bronze
Light Flyweight (– 48 kilograms)	Mohamed Haddad; Syria	(Socialist Federal Republic of Yugoslavia) Dragan Živadinović; Yugoslavia	Galip Aktaş; Turkey; Salvatore Todisco; Italy
Flyweight (– 51 kilograms)	Hamed Halbouni; Syria	Miloud Mouhi; Morocco	Vedat Tutuk; Turkey (Socialist Federal Republic of Yugoslavia) Sefedin Salijevski; Yugoslavia
Bantamweight (– 54 kilograms)	Redouane Handassi; Morocco	Hamadi Chargui; Tunisia	Altan Angın; Turkey; Fabrizio Cappai; Italy
Featherweight (– 57 kilograms)	Abdelhak Achik; Morocco	Luigi Guitadamo; Italy	Mohamad Soltani; Tunisia; Mohamad Alomar; Syria
Lightweight (– 60 kilograms)	Mayez Khanji; Syria	Azzedine Saïd; Algeria	Atila Arslan; Turkey (Socialist Federal Republic of Yugoslavia) Afrim Majanci; Yugoslavia
Light Welterweight (– 63.5 kilograms)	(Socialist Federal Republic of Yugoslavia) Vukašin Dobrašinović; Yugoslavia	Michele Caldarella; Italy	Manuel Sierra; Spain; Ali Çıtak; Turkey
Welterweight (– 67 kilograms)	(Socialist Federal Republic of Yugoslavia) Agim Ljatifi; Yugoslavia	Faouzi Hattab; France	Khemais Refai; Tunisia; Hasan Özdemir; Turkey
Light Middleweight (– 71 kilograms)	Noureddine Meziane; Algeria	(Socialist Federal Republic of Yugoslavia) Fatmir Makoli; Yugoslavia	Stefano Pompilio; Italy; Fikret Kaman; Turkey
Middleweight (– 75 kilograms)	Raouf Harbi; Tunisia	Ahmed Dine; Algeria	Michele Mastrodonato; Italy; Hasan Kordieh; Syria
Light Heavyweight (– 81 kilograms)	(Socialist Federal Republic of Yugoslavia) Damir Škaro; Yugoslavia	Andrea Magi; Italy	Jamiel Nabhan; Syria; Ahmet Canbakış; Turkey
Heavyweight (– 91 kilograms)	Mohamed Bouchiche; Algeria	Luigi Gaudiano; Italy	José Ortege; Spain; Georgios Stefanopoulos; Greece
Super Heavyweight (– +91 kilograms)	(Socialist Federal Republic of Yugoslavia) Aziz Salihu; Yugoslavia	Mouhamed Toubi; Morocco	(Turkey) Erdal Sarıkaş; Tunisia; Maymoun Alcheikh-Aboud; Syria

== Medal table ==
Place	Nation	1st place, gold medalist(s)	2nd place, silver medalist(s)	3rd place, bronze medalist(s)	Total
1	Yugoslavia	4	2	2	8
2	Syria	3	0	4	7
3	Algeria	2	2	0	4
3	Morocco	2	2	0	4
5	Tunisia	1	1	2	4
6	Italy	0	4	4	8
7	France	0	1	0	1
8	Turkey	0	0	9	9
9	Spain	0	0	2	2
10	Greece	0	0	1	1
Total		12	12	24	48
