= Polona Frelih =

Slovenian table tennis player

Personal information
- Nationality: Slovenian
- Born: 3 September 1970 (age 54); Ljubljana, Yugoslavia

Sport
- Sport: Table tennis

Polona Frelih (born 3 September 1970) is a Slovenian table tennis player. She competed in the women's singles event at the 1992 Summer Olympics.
