= Betty Molteni =

Italian middle-distance runner

Personal information
- Full name: Elisabetta Molteni
- National team: Italy (12 caps 1982-1990)
- Born: 30 August 1962 (age 63) Besana Brianza, Italy

Sport
- Country: Italy
- Sport: Athletics
- Events: Middle-distance running; Cross country running
- Club: Snia Milano

Achievements and titles
- Personal bests: 1500: 4:13.00 (1985); 3000: 9:31.58 (1984)

Betty Molteni (born 30 August 1962) is a former Italian female middle-distance runner and cross-country runner who competed at the individual senior level at the World Athletics Cross Country Championships (1985, 1986, 1990).

== National titles ==
She won a national championship at the individual senior level.

- Italian Athletics Championships
  - 1500 m: 1987
