= Joachim Assenmacher =

German long jumper

Joakim Assenmacher (born 10 January 1963) is a retired West German long jumper.

He finished fourteenth at the 1987 European Indoor Championships. He represented the sports club USC Mainz, and won bronze medals at the West German championships in 1985 and 1989.

His personal best jump was 8.03 metres, achieved in May 1988 in Bensheim.
