= Nicoletta Tozzi =

Italian middle-distance competitor

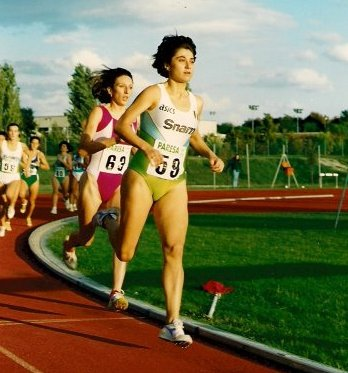

Personal information
- Nationality: Italian
- Born: 3 January 1966 (age 60) Cesena, Italy
- Height: 1.68 m (5 ft 6 in)
- Weight: 56 kg (123 lb)

Sport
- Country: Italy (18 caps)
- Sport: Athletics
- Event: Middle-distance running
- Club: SNAM gas metano
- Retired: 1993

Achievements and titles
- Personal bests: 800 m: 2:01.04 (1990); 1500 m: 4:19.0 (1993)

Nicoletta Tozzi (born 3 January 1966) is a former Italian middle-distance runner who currently holds a national record with the relay national team.

== Biography ==
She won 9 national championships at senior level.

== National records ==
- 4x800 metres relay: '8:18.3 ( (United Kingdom) Sheffield, 5 June 1992) - with Nadia Falvo, Stefania Savi, Fabia Trabaldo - current holder.

== Achievements ==
Year	Competition	Venue	Position	Event	Time	Notes
1987	Mediterranean Games	(Syria) Latakia	7th	800 m	2:06.01	
1987	Universiade	(Socialist Federal Republic of Yugoslavia) Zagreb	Semi	800 m	2:04.78	
1989	Universiade	(West Germany) Duisburg	7th	800 m	2:03.24	
1991	Universiade	(United Kingdom) Sheffield	8th	800 m	2:08.94	
1993	Mediterranean Games	(France) Narbonne	5th	800 m	2:11.53	
1993	Universiade	(United States) Buffalo	6th	800 m	2:05.48	

== National titles ==
- Italian Athletics Championships
  - 800 m: 1984, 1986, 1987, 1988, 1989, 1990, 1993 (7)
- Italian Athletics Indoor Championships
  - 800 m: 1993, 1994 (2)

== See aldo ==
- List of Italian records in athletics
