= Maria Assunta Chiummariello =

Italian shot putter

Personal information
- National team: Italy (2 caps from 1977 to 1978)
- Born: 1 January 1958 (age 68) Palmanova, Italy

Sport
- Sport: Athletics
- Event: Shot put
- Club: Snia Bpd Milano

Achievements and titles
- Personal best: Shot put: 17.74 m (1986)

Maria Assunta Chiummariello (born 1 January 1958) is a former Italian shot putter three-time national champion at senior level.

== Career ==
As of 13 March 2021 her 17.74 m in the shot put established in 1986, still represents the eighth best Italian all-time performance.

== National titles ==
Chiummariello won three national championships.

- Italian Athletics Championships
  - Shot put: 1984, 1986, 1987

== Personal bests ==
Outdoor

- Shot put: 17.74 m ( (Italy) Imola, 12 October 1986)

== See also ==
- Italian all-time lists - Shot put
