= Gianni Tozzi =

Italian former athlete (born 1962)

Personal information
- Born: 6 May 1962 (age 64) Tollo, Italy
- Height: 1.84 m (6 ft 0 in)
- Weight: 70 kg (154 lb)

Sport
- Sport: Athletics
- Events: 110 m hurdles, 60 m hurdles
- Club: Gruppo Sportivo Forestale
Medal record
Representing Italy
Mediterranean Games
Silver medal – second place	1987 Latakia	110m hurdles

Gianni Tozzi (born 6 May 1962) is an Italian former athlete who competed in the sprint hurdles. He won the silver medal at the 1987 Mediterranean Games. In addition, he represented his country at the 1987 World Championships without advancing from the first round.

== Biography ==
His personal bests are 13.61 seconds in the 110 metres hurdles (+0.5 m/s; Barcelona 1988) and 7.82 seconds in the 60 metres hurdles (Turin 1989).

== International competitions ==
Year	Competition	Venue	Position	Event	Notes
Representing Italy
1981	European Junior Championships	Utrecht, Netherlands	7th	110 m hurdles	14.28
1983	Mediterranean Games	Casablanca, Morocco	4th	110 m hurdles	13.81 (w)
1985	World Indoor Games	Paris, France	9th (sf)	60 m hurdles	7.88
1985	European Indoor Championships	Piraeus, Greece	16th (h)	60 m hurdles	7.95
1986	European Championships	Stuttgart, West Germany	16th (sf)	110 m hurdles	14.16
1987	World Championships	Rome, Italy	19th (h)	110 m hurdles	13.87
1987	Mediterranean Games	Latakia, Syria	2nd	110 m hurdles	13.92
1988	European Indoor Championships	Budapest, Hungary	13th (h)	60 m hurdles	8.02
1989	European Indoor Championships	The Hague, Netherlands	24th (h)	60 m hurdles	7.99
1990	European Championships	Split, Yugoslavia	–	110 m hurdles	DQ
