= Cosetta Campana =

Italian sprinter (born 1961)

Personal information
- Nationality: Italian
- Born: June 12, 1961 (age 65) Bassano del Grappa, Italy
- Height: 1.78 m (5 ft 10 in)
- Weight: 64 kg (141 lb)

Sport
- Country: Italy
- Sport: Athletics
- Event: 400 metres
- Club: Fiat Also Torino

Achievements and titles
- Personal best: 400 m: 52.93 (1986)
Medal record
Mediterranean Games
Gold medal – first place	1983 Casablanca	4x400 m relay
Gold medal – first place	1987 Latakia	4x400 m relay
Silver medal – second place	1991 Athens	4x400 m relay
Bronze medal – third place	1983 Casablanca	400 m
Bronze medal – third place	1987 Latakia	400 m

Cosetta Campana (born 12 June 1961) is a former Italian sprinter (400 m).

== Biography ==
In the era of Erica Rossi (20 national championships), she was able to win the national championships three times. She has 43 caps in national team from 1983 to 1994.

== Achievements ==
Year	Competition	Venue	Position	Event	Time	Notes
1983	Mediterranean Games	(Morocco) Casablanca	3rd	400 metres	54.52	
1983	Mediterranean Games	(Morocco) Casablanca	1st	4x400 metres relay	3:33.63	
1984	Olympic Games	(United States) Los Angeles	6th	4x400 metres relay	3:30.82	
1986	European Championships	(Germany) Stuttgart	SF	400 metres	53.89	
1986	European Championships	(Germany) Stuttgart	5th	4x400 metres relay	3:32.30	
1987	Mediterranean Games	(Syria) Latakia	3rd	400 metres	54.28	
1987	Mediterranean Games	(Syria) Latakia	1st	4x400 metres relay	3:32.14	
1987	World Championships	(Italy) Rome	heats	4x400 metres relay	3:31.77	
1991	Mediterranean Games	(Greece) Athens	2nd	4x400 metres relay	3:33.68	

== National titles ==
- 2 wins in 400 metres at the Italian Athletics Championships (1986, 1992)
- 1 win in 400 metres at the Italian Athletics Indoor Championships (1987)

== See also ==
- Italy at the 1986 European Athletics Championships
