= Maria Marello =

Italian discus thrower and coach

Personal information
- Nationality: Italian
- Born: March 11, 1961 (age 65) Turin, Italy

Sport
- Country: Italy
- Sport: Athletics
- Event: Discus throw

Achievements and titles
- Personal best: Discus throw: 57.54 m (1986)
Medal record
Representing Italy
Mediterranean Games
Gold medal – first place	1987 Latakia	Discus throw

Maria Marello (born 11 March 1961) is a retired Italian discus thrower. She is the coach of the Italian female discus thrower Daisy Osakue, and javelin thrower Zahra Bani.

== Biography ==
She won the gold medal at the 1987 Mediterranean Games and finished fifth at the 1991 Mediterranean Games. She also competed at the 1987 World Championships without reaching the final.

Marello became Italian champion twice, in 1987 and 1988. Her personal best time was 57.54 metres, achieved in June 1986 in Verona.
