= Alessandra Fossati =

Italian high jumper

Personal information
- National team: Italy
- Born: 30 September 1963 (age 62) Milan, Italy

Sport
- Sport: Athletics
- Event: High jump

Achievements and titles
- Personal best: High jump (i): 1.90 m (1986)

Alessandra Fossati (born 30 September 1963) is a retired Italian high jumper.

== Biography ==
She became Italian champion in 1986. Her personal best jump was 1.90 metres, achieved in February 1986 in Madrid.

== Achievements ==
Year	Tournament	Venue	Result	Extra
1979	European Indoor Championships	Vienna, Austria	4th	
1980	European Indoor Championships	Sindelfingen, West Germany	6th	
1981	European Junior Championships	Utrecht, Netherlands	2nd	
1986	European Indoor Championships	Madrid, Spain	5th	
