= Marcello Pantone =

Italian sprinter

Personal information
- Nationality: Italian
- Born: 6 April 1965 (age 61) Potenza, Italy

Sport
- Country: Italy
- Sport: Athletics
- Event: 400 metres

Achievements and titles
- Personal best: 400 m: 46.17 (1987)
Medal record
Mediterranean Games
Gold medal – first place	1987 Latakia	4x400 metres relay
Universiade
Bronze medal – third place	1991 Sheffield	4x400 metres relay

Marcello Pantone (born 6 April 1965) is an Italian male retired sprinter, who participated at the 1987 World Championships in Athletics.

== Achievements ==
Year	Competition	Venue	Position	Event	Performance	Notes
1987	World Championships	(Italy) Rome	Semi	4x400 metres relay	3:03.91	
