= Inna Yevseyeva =

Personal information
- Born: 14 August 1964 (age 62) Zhytomyr, Soviet Union
Medal record
Women's Athletics
Representing Soviet Union
Summer Universiade
Gold medal – first place	1991 Sheffield	800 metres
Silver medal – second place	1991 Sheffield	4 x 400 metres relay
Bronze medal – third place	1989 Duisburg	800 metres
Representing CIS
European Indoor Championships
Silver medal – second place	1992 Genoa	800 metres

Inna Yevseyeva (Russian: Инна Евсеева; born 14 August 1964) is a retired middle-distance athlete who specialised in the 800 metres. She was born in Zhytomyr, Ukrainian SSR and represented the Soviet Union in the 1980s and the early 1990s, and then Ukraine. A two-time Olympian, Yevseyeva finished sixth in the 1988 Olympic 800 m final in Seoul and fourth in the 1992 Olympic 800 m final in Barcelona. She set her personal best in the women's 800 metres with 1:56.0 on 4 July 1988 at a meet in Kharkov, which made her the fastest 800m woman in the world for 1988.
