= Annarita Balzani =

Italian sprinter (born 1967)

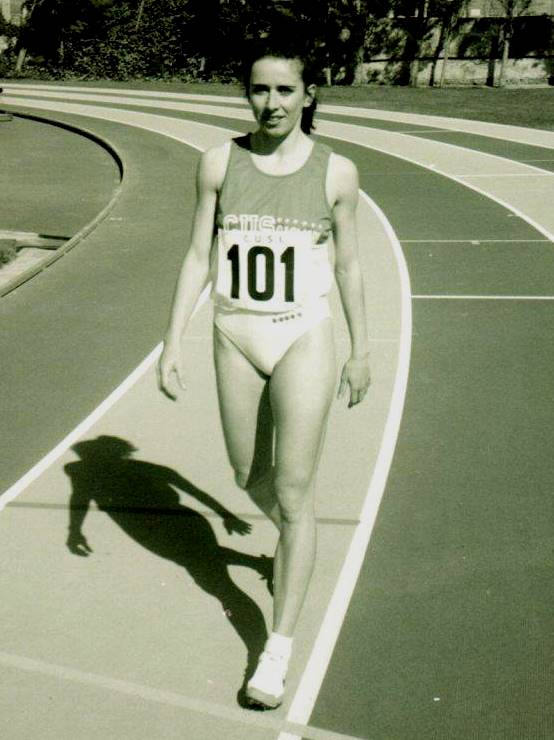

Personal information
- Nationality: Italian
- Born: 15 April 1967 (age 59) Meldola, Italy

Sport
- Country: Italy
- Sport: Athletics
- Event: Sprint
- Club: Edera Atletica
- Coached by: Herself

Achievements and titles
- Personal best: 100 m: 11.00 (1985)
Medal record
Mediterranean Games
Silver medal – second place	1987 Latakia	4×100 m relay
Silver medal – second place	1993 Narbonne	4×100 m relay
Summer Universiade
Bronze medal – third place	1991 Sheffield	4×100 m relay
Event	1st	2nd	3rd
Summer Universiade	0	0	1
Mediterranean Games	0	2	0
Total	0	2	1

Annarita Balzani (born 15 April 1967 in Meldola) is a former Italian sprinter.

== Biography ==
She won three medals at senior level, two of these with the national relay team at International athletics competitions. She has 26 caps for the national team from 1983 to 1993. On 2 December 2012 she was elected federal advisor of the Federazione Italiana di Atletica Leggera (FIDAL), in the team of the new President Alfio Giomi.

== Achievements ==
Year	Competition	Venue	Position	Event	Notes
Representing Italy
1987	Mediterranean Games	Latakia, Syria	2nd	4×100 metres relay	45.17
1990	European Championships	Split, Yugoslavia	5th	4×100m relay	43.71
1991	Summer Universiade	Sheffield, United Kingdom	3rd	4×100 metres relay	45.24
1993	Mediterranean Games	Narbonne, France	2nd	4×100 metres relay	45.62
1994	European Championships	Helsinki, Finland	8th	4×100m relay	44.46

== See also ==
- Italy national relay team - All the medals
