= Gianni Stecchi =

Italian pole vaulter

Personal information
- Full name: Giovanni Stecchi
- Nationality: Italian
- Born: 3 March 1958 (age 68) Florence, Italy

Sport
- Country: Italy
- Sport: Athletics
- Event: Pole vault
- Club: Assi Banca Toscana
- Coached by: Vitaly Petrov

Achievements and titles
- Personal best: Pole vault: 5.60 m (1987)
Medal record
Mediterranean Games
| Gold medal – first place | 1987 Latakia | Pole vault |

Gianni Stecchi (born 3 March 1958) is a retired Italian pole vaulter.

== Biography ==
He won one medal at the International athletics competitions. He is the father of Claudio Stecchi.

== Achievements ==
| Year | Tournament | Venue | Result | Extra |
|---|---|---|---|---|
| 1987 | World Indoor Championships | Indianapolis, United States | 10th | |
| 1987 | European Indoor Championships | Liévin, France | 11th | |
| 1987 | World Championships | Rome, Italy | 11th | |
| 1987 | Mediterranean Games | Latakia, Syria | 1st | |

== National titles ==
He has won 3 times the individual national championship.

- 2 wins in pole vault (1986, 1987)
- 1 win in pole vault indoor (1987)

== See also ==
- Italian all-time top lists - Pole vault
