= Lucio Serrani =

Italian hammer thrower (born 1961)

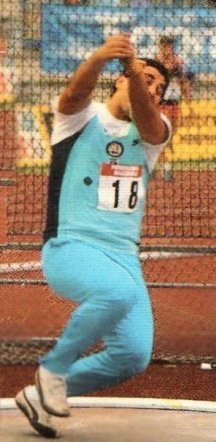

Personal information
- Nationality: Italian
- Born: March 11, 1961 (age 65) Sangemini, Terni

Sport
- Country: Italy
- Sport: Athletics
- Event: Hammer throw
- Club: Pro Patria Milano

Achievements and titles
- Personal best: Hammer throw: 78.02 m (1988)
Medal record
Representing Italy
Summer Universiade
| Silver medal – second place | 1985 Kobe | Hammer throw |
| Bronze medal – third place | 1987 Zagreb | Hammer throw |
Mediterranean Games
| Gold medal – first place | 1987 Latakia | Hammer throw |

Lucio Serrani (born 11 March 1961) is a retired male hammer thrower from Italy.

== Biography ==
He twice competed for his native country at the Summer Olympics: in 1984 and 1988. Serrani set his personal best (78.02 metres) in the men's hammer throw event in 1988.

== Achievements ==
| Year | Competition | Venue | Position | Notes |
Representing Italy
| 1984 | Olympic Games | Los Angeles, United States | 15th | 70.64 m |
| 1987 | Summer Universiade | Zagreb, FR Yugoslavia | 3rd | 75.70 m |
| 1987 | Mediterranean Games | Latakia, Syria | 1st | 74.30 m |
| 1987 | World Championships | Rome, Italy | 16th | 74.00 m |
| 1988 | Olympic Games | Seoul, South Korea | 21st | 70.50 m |

== See also ==
- Italian all-time lists - Hammer throw
