= Anna Rita Angotzi =

Italian sprinter (born 1967)

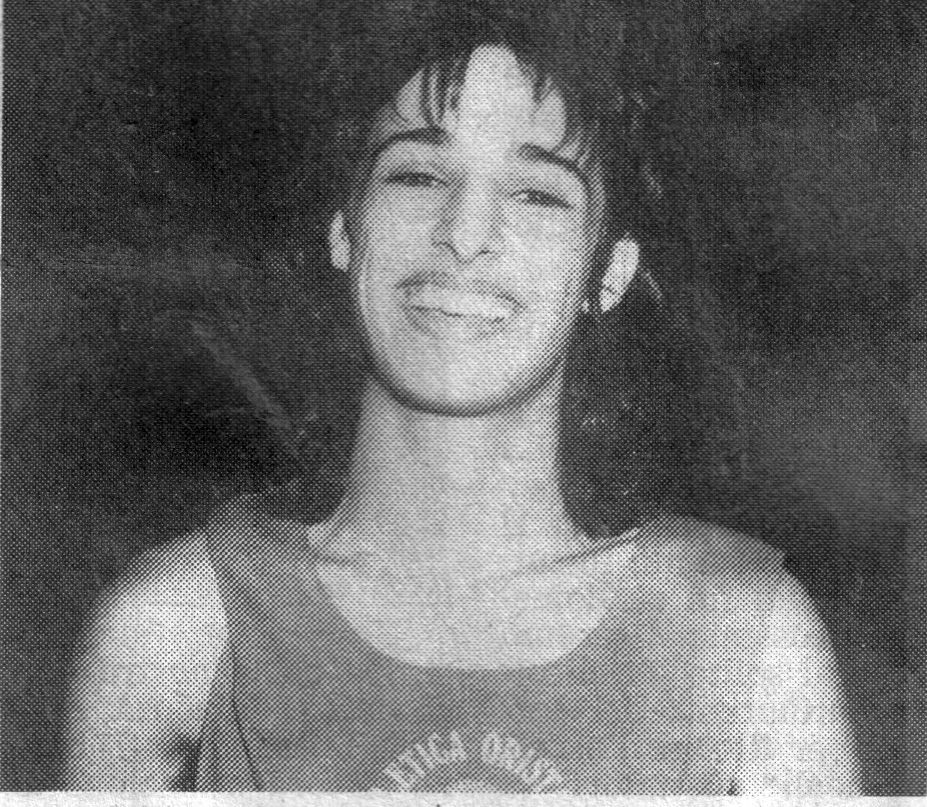
- Anna Rita Angotzi in the 1980s

Personal information
- Full name: Anna Rita Angotzi
- Nationality: Italian
- Born: February 12, 1967 (age 59) Oristano, Italy
- Height: 1.70 m (5 ft 7 in)
- Weight: 50 kg (110 lb)

Sport
- Country: Italy
- Sport: Athletics
- Event: Sprint
- Club: Atletica Oristano

Achievements and titles
- Personal bests: 100 m: 11.36 (1988); 200 m: 23.33 (1988)
Medal record
Mediterranean Games
| Silver medal – second place | 1987 Latakia | 4x100 m relay |
| Bronze medal – third place | 1987 Latakia | 200 m |

Anna Rita Angotzi (born 12 February 1967 in Oristano), known as Rita Angotzi, is an Italian former sprinter.

== Biography ==
She participated at the 1988 Summer Olympics.

== Achievements ==
| Year | Competition | Venue | Position | Event | Performance | Notes |
|---|---|---|---|---|---|---|
| 1988 | Olympic Games | (South Korea) Seoul | Quarter-finals | 200 metres | 23.33 | |

== See also ==
- Italian all-time lists - 100 metres
- Italy national relay team - All the medals
