= Marco Rossi (decathlete) =

Italian decathlete

Personal information
- Nationality: Italian
- Born: 7 July 1963 (age 63) Bolzano

Sport
- Country: Italy
- Sport: Athletics
- Event: Decathlon

Achievements and titles
- Personal best: Decathlon: 7761 pts (1988)
Medal record
Mediterranean Games
Gold medal – first place	1987 Latakia	Decathlon

Marco Rossi (born 7 July 1963) is an Italian male retired decathlete who participated in the 1987 World Championships in Athletics.

== Biography ==
During his career, Rossi won the gold medal at the 1987 Mediterranean Games. He won seven times in the national championships at the senior level.

== Personal best ==
- Decathlon: 7761 pts ( (Austria) Götzis, 19 June 1988) at the 1988 Hypo-Meeting
  - 100 m: 10.94, long jump: 7.05 m, shot put: 13.80 m, high jump: 1.96 m, 400 m: 49.11;
  - 110 m hs: 14.52, discus throw: 42.34 m, pole vault: 4.30 m, javelin throw: 51.30 m, 1500 m: 4:22.95

== Achievements ==
Year	Competition	Venue	Position	Event	Performance	Notes
1987	World Championships	(Italy) Rome	DNF	Decathlon	NM	

== National titles ==
- Italian Athletics Championships
  - Decathlon: 1985, 1986, 1988 (3)
- Italian Athletics Indoor Championships
  - Heptathlon: 1982, 1984, 1986, 1989 (4)

== See also ==
- Italian all-time top lists - Decathlon
