= Marco Martino =

Italian discus thrower

Personal information
- Nationality: Italian
- Born: 21 February 1960 (age 66) Rome, Italy
- Height: 1.90 m (6 ft 3 in)
- Weight: 97 kg (214 lb)

Sport
- Country: Italy
- Sport: Athletics
- Event: Discus throw
- Club: G.S. Fiamme Gialle

Achievements and titles
- Personal best: Discus throw: 67.62 m (1989)
Medal record
Mediterranean Games
Gold medal – first place	1987 Latakia	Discus thrower
Silver medal – second place	1991 Athens	Discus thrower
Bronze medal – third place	1983 Casablanca	Discus thrower

Marco Martino (born 21 February 1960) is an Italian former discus thrower. He won three medals, at senior level, at the International athletics competitions.

== Biography ==
He competed in the 1984 Summer Olympics.

== National titles ==
Marco Martino has won 14 times the individual national championship.

- 6 wins in discus throw at the Italian Athletics Championships (1983, 1986, 1987, 1988, 1990, 1991)
- 8 wins in discus throw at the Italian Winter Throwing Championships (1985, 1986, 1987, 1988, 1989, 1991, 1993, 1998)

== See also ==
- Italian records in athletics
- Italian all-time top lists - Discus throw
