= 1987 Mediterranean Games =

10th edition of the Mediterranean Games

X Mediterranean Games Latakia 1987
- Host city: Latakia, Syria
- Nations: 18
- Athletes: 1,996
- Events: 162 in 19 sports
- Opening: 11 September 1987
- Closing: 25 September 1987
- Opened by: President Hafez al-Assad
- Main venue: Sports City Stadium

The X Mediterranean Games (Arabic: ألعاب البحر الأبيض المتوسط 1987), commonly known as the 1987 Mediterranean Games, were the 10th Mediterranean Games. The Games were held in Latakia, Syria, from 11 to 25 September 1987. A total of 1,996 athletes from 18 countries participated, of which 467 were women. The Games featured 162 medal events from 19 different sports.

== Participating nations ==
The following is a list of the 18 nations that participated in the 1987 Mediterranean Games in Latakia:

- Albania (33)
- Algeria (69)
- Cyprus (54)
- Egypt (61)
- France (191)
- Greece (213)
- Italy (263)
- Lebanon (135)
- Libya (21)
- Malta (8)
- Monaco (5)
- Morocco (88)
- San Marino (30)
- Spain (194)
- Syria (277)
- Tunisia (47)
- Turkey (212)
- Yugoslavia (95)

== Sports ==
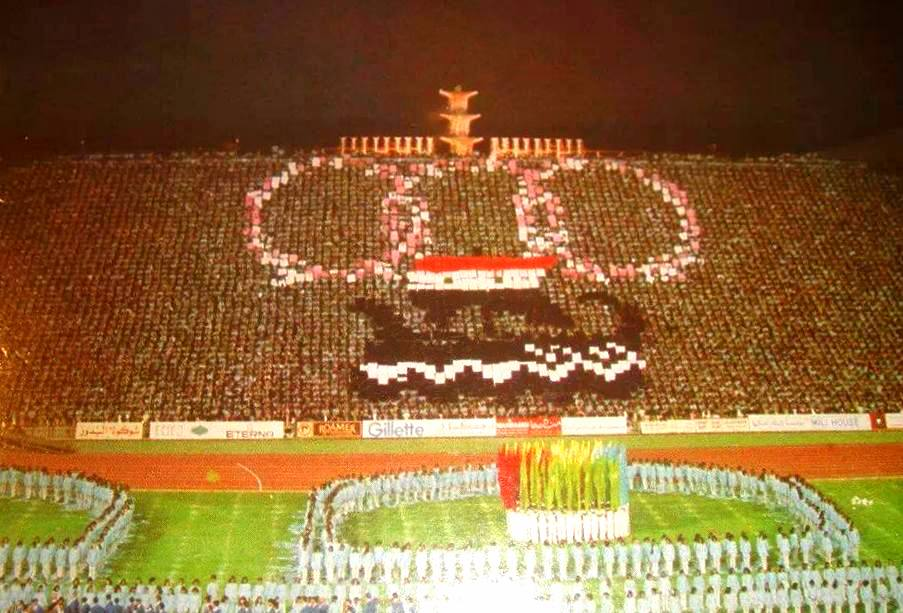
During the opening ceremony

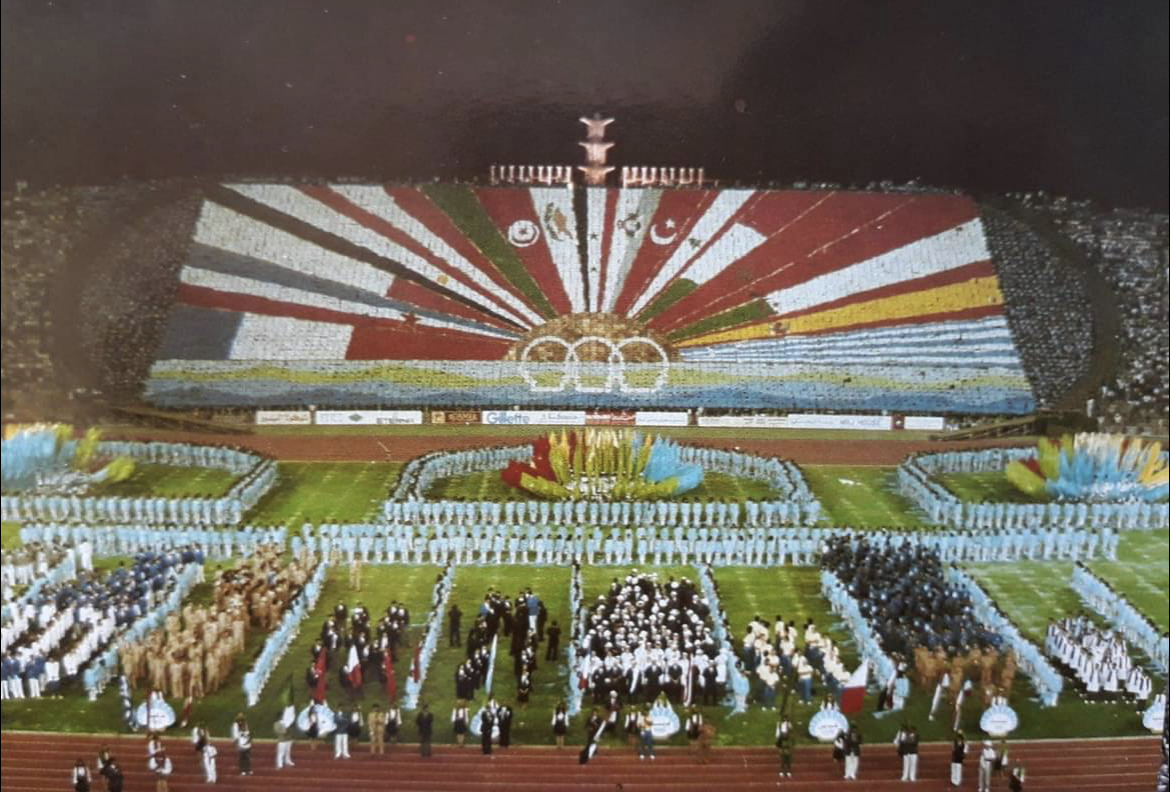
The opening ceremony continues

- Athletics
- Basketball
- Boxing
- Cycling
- Diving
- Football
- Gymnastics
- Handball
- Judo
- Shooting
- Swimming
- Table tennis
- Tennis
- Volleyball
- Water polo
- Weightlifting
- Wrestling

== Medal table ==
* Host nation (Syria)

Rank	Nation	Gold	Silver	Bronze	Total
1	Italy	69	45	38	152
2	Yugoslavia	17	19	17	53
3	France	16	30	22	68
4	Spain	15	21	33	69
5	Morocco	9	8	3	20
6	Syria*	9	6	12	27
7	Turkey	8	9	22	39
8	Greece	7	14	16	37
9	Algeria	5	3	4	12
10	Egypt	4	4	6	14
11	Albania	3	1	4	8
12	Tunisia	2	4	5	11
13	Cyprus	2	0	0	2
14	Lebanon	0	1	0	1
14	San Marino	0	1	0	1
Totals (15 entries)		166	166	182	514

== See also ==
- Football at the 1987 Mediterranean Games
