= Athletics at the 1991 Mediterranean Games =

1991 Athletics at the Mediterranean Games

Athletics at the XI Mediterranean Games
- The host stadium later held the 2004 Olympic Games
- Dates: 6–11 July
- Host city: Athens, Greece
- Venue: Olympic Stadium
- Events: 38
- Participation: 15 nations
- Records set: 22 Games records

At the 1991 Mediterranean Games, the athletics events were held at the Olympic Stadium in Athens, Greece. A total of 38 events were contested, of which 23 by male and 15 by female athletes. An exhibition heptathlon also took place, with Algeria's Yasmina Azzizi being the only athlete to compete. Several hundred athletes from fourteen Mediterranean nations took part in the competition.

Nine nations reached the medal table, with eight of them having an athlete top the podium. Italy was dominant, taking eleven gold medals and 38 overall. France was a clear second with nine golds from a haul of 25 medals. Algeria won the next highest number of golds (five), while Spain had the third largest overall medals with thirteen. Morocco also performed well (four golds and twelve in total) as did the host nation Greece (three golds and eleven overall). A total of 22 games records were broken in Athens – this was over half of the event programme and only five field event records were unbeaten by the end of the tournament.

Hassiba Boulmerka won a middle-distance double and went on to win the 1500 metres at the World Championships a month later. Fabienne Ficher was runner-up in the 200 metres but she added two golds to her tally through victories in the relays with the French team. Ezio Madonia won the men's 100 metres and anchored the Italian team to a second gold in the 4×100 metres relay. Italy's Agnese Maffeis broke the games record in the discus throw and also won the shot put silver medal. Paraskevi Patoulidou played a role in three of Greece's medals, taking the women's 100 m gold, silver in the 100 metres hurdles and a bronze in the 4×100 m relay.

Three former Olympic champions featured in Italy's team (Maurizio Damilano, Alessandro Andrei, and Gabriella Dorio). Damilano, who set a games record, won the men's 20 kilometres walk title at that year's world championships, while men's steeplechase winner Azzedine Brahmi became a world bronze medallist in his event. Brahim Boutayeb, the reigning Olympic champion in the 10,000 metres, took the world 5000 metres bronze after his games record performance in Athens.

The games proved a launching point for many less-established athletes: the 1992 Barcelona Olympics saw Mediterranean medallists Boulmerka, Patoulidou, Khalid Skah and Daniel Plaza win an Olympic gold medal. The 1500 m runner-up Rachid El Basir repeated his placing there. Women's 400 m hurdles winner Nezha Bidouane went on to become a two-time world champion and 1500 m champion Gennaro Di Napoli later had two wins at the IAAF World Indoor Championships.

== Medal table ==
* Host nation (Italy)

Rank	Nation	Gold	Silver	Bronze	Total
1	Italy*	11	17	10	38
2	France	9	8	8	25
3	Algeria†	5	0	1	6
4	Morocco	4	2	6	12
5	Spain	3	5	5	13
6	Greece	3	3	5	11
7	Yugoslavia	2	1	0	3
8	Cyprus	1	1	0	2
9	Turkey	0	1	3	4
Totals (9 entries)		38	38	38	114

- ^{†} Excludes Yasmina Azzizi's gold in the heptathlon, as this was an exhibition event only.

== Medal summary ==
=== Men ===
Event	Gold		Silver		Bronze	
100 metres (wind: +0.5 m/s)	Ezio Madonia (ITA)	10.27	Yiannis Zisimides (CYP)	10.41	Cengiz Kavaklıoğlu (TUR)	10.44
200 metres (wind: -1.0 m/s)	Stefano Tilli (ITA)	20.73	Miguel Ángel Gómez (ESP)	20.76	Sandro Floris (ITA)	20.96
400 metres	Olivier Noirot (FRA)	45.41	Fabio Grossi (ITA)	45.93	Abdelali Kasbane (MAR)	45.9
800 metres	Réda Abdenouz (ALG)	1:47.62	Luis Javier González (ESP)	1:47.84	Tonino Viali (ITA)	1:47.86
1500 metres	Gennaro Di Napoli (ITA)	3:42.80	Rachid El Basir (MAR)	3:43.06	Zeki Öztürk (TUR)	3:43.22
5000 metres	Brahim Boutayeb (MAR)	13:29.64 GR	Khalid Skah (MAR)	13:30.00	Antonio Martins (FRA)	13:38.08
10,000 metres	Hammou Boutayeb (MAR)	28:24.19 GR	Francesco Bennici (ITA)	28:38.19	Khalid Boulami (MAR)	28:52.84
110 metres hurdles (wind: +0.7 m/s)	Dan Philibert (FRA)	13.56 GR	Carlos Sala (ESP)	13.64	Fausto Frigerio (ITA)	13.72
400 metres hurdles	Stéphane Caristan (FRA)	49.27 GR	Fabrizio Mori (ITA)	49.85	Mauro Maurizi (ITA)	50.05
3000 metres steeplechase	Azzedine Brahmi (ALG)	8:21.58	Alessandro Lambruschini (ITA)	8:22.95	Abdelaziz Sahere (MAR)	8:24.15
4×100 metres relay	Italy (ITA); Mario Longo; Carlo Simionato; Sandro Floris; Ezio Madonia	39.12	Spain (ESP); Juan Trapero; Enrique Talavera; Miguel Ángel Gómez; Luis Turón	39.39	France (FRA); Antoine Richard; Éric Perrot; Olivier Théophile; Pascal Théophile	39.99
4×400 metres relay	Italy (ITA); Marco Vaccari; Alessandro Aimar; Fabio Grossi; Andrea Nuti	3:03.20 GR	Yugoslavia (YUG); Dejan Jovković; Nenad Đurović; Ismail Mačev; Slobodan Branković	3:03.74	Morocco (MAR); Abdelali Kasbane; Ali Dahane; Bouchaib Belkaid; Benyounés Lahlou	3:03.75
Marathon	Salah Qoqaiche (MAR)	2:20:26	Gianluigi Curreli (ITA)	2:20:54	Christos Sotiropoulos (GRE)	2:24:54
20 km walk	Maurizio Damilano (ITA)	1:22:48 GR	Daniel Plaza (ESP)	1:23:51	Olegario Regidor (ESP)	1:26:45
High jump	Othmane Belfaa (ALG)	2.28 m GR	Luca Toso (ITA)	2.26 m	Fabrizio Borellini (ITA)	2.26 m
Pole vault	Philippe d'Encausse (FRA)	5.60 m GR	Jean-Marc Tailhardat (FRA)	5.60 m	Marco Andreini (ITA)	5.50 m
Long jump	Konstandinos Koukodimos (GRE)	8.26 m GR	Fausto Frigerio (ITA)	8.15 m (w)	Giovanni Evangelisti (ITA)	7.89 m
Triple jump	Marios Hadjiandreou (CYP)	17.13 m GR	Alex Norca (FRA)	16.74 m	Lotfi Khaïda (ALG)	16.64 m
Shot put	Alessandro Andrei (ITA)	19.38 m	Luciano Zerbini (ITA)	19.25 m	Luc Viudès (FRA)	19.05 m
Discus throw	Luciano Zerbini (ITA)	60.10 m	Marco Martino (ITA)	59.82 m	David Martinez (ESP)	59.16 m
Hammer throw	Raphaël Piolanti (FRA)	75.10 m GR	Enrico Sgrulletti (ITA)	74.78 m	Savvas Saritzoglou (GRE)	70.06 m
Javelin throw (new model)	Julián Sotelo (ESP)	76.04 m GR	Fabio De Gaspari (ITA)	73.10 m	Charlus Bertimon (FRA)	72.52 m
Decathlon	Saša Karan (YUG)	7771 pts GR	Alper Kasapoğlu (TUR)	7650 pts	Efthimios Andreoglou (GRE)	7513 pts

=== Women ===
Event	Gold		Silver		Bronze	
100 metres (wind: +0.3 m/s)	Voula Patoulidou (GRE)	11.48	Maguy Nestoret (FRA)	11.50	Magali Simioneck (FRA)	11.53
200 metres (wind: +0.2 m/s)	Marisa Masullo (ITA)	23.21 GR	Fabienne Ficher (FRA)	23.40	Valérie Jean-Charles (FRA)	23.52
400 metres	Julia Merino (ESP)	51.88 GR	Véronique Poulain (FRA)	52.85	Francine Landre (FRA)	53.43
800 metres	Hassiba Boulmerka (ALG)	2:01.27	Frédérique Quentin (FRA)	2:01.51	Nadia Falvo (ITA)	2:02.58
1500 metres	Hassiba Boulmerka (ALG)	4:08.17	Irini Theodoridou (GRE)	4:10.30	Gabriella Dorio (ITA)	4:10.63
3000 metres	Roberta Brunet (ITA)	8:45.68 GR	Nadia Dandolo (ITA)	8:46.94	Amina Maanaoui (MAR)	9:22.94
100 metres hurdles (wind: -0.2 m/s)	Anne Piquereau (FRA)	12.88 GR	Voula Patoulidou (GRE)	12.96	María José Mardomingo (ESP)	13.34
400 metres hurdles	Nezha Bidouane (MAR)	55.13 GR	Irmgard Trojer (ITA)	55.42	Nadia Zatouani (MAR)	57.57
4×100 metres relay	France (FRA); Magali Simioneck; Maguy Nestoret; Fabienne Ficher; Valérie Jean-Charles	43.66	Italy (ITA); Marisa Masullo; Donatella Dal Bianco; Daniela Ferrian; Rossella Tarolo	43.67	Greece (GRE); Kanelidou; Ekaterini Koffa; Marina Vasarmidou; Voula Patoulidou	44.77
4×400 metres relay	France (FRA); Elsa Devassoigne; Véronique Poulain; Francine Landre; Fabienne Ficher	3:31.00 GR	Italy (ITA); Roberta Rabaioli; Johanna Zuddas; Barbara Martinelli; Cosetta Campana	3:33.68	Spain (ESP); Idoia Granda; Gregoria Ferrer; Amaia Andrés; Esther Lahoz	3:34.21
High jump	Isabelle Chevallier (FRA)	1.90 m	Niki Gavera (GRE)	1.87 m	Niki Bakoyianni (GRE)	1.87 m
Long jump	Tamara Malešev (YUG)	6.60 m GR	Valentina Uccheddu (ITA)	6.52 m	Isabel López (ESP)	6.14 m
Shot put	Margarita Ramos (ESP)	17.71 m	Agnese Maffeis (ITA)	17.46 m	Mara Rosolen (ITA)	15.95 m
Discus throw	Agnese Maffeis (ITA)	59.46 m GR	Isabelle Devaluez (FRA)	56.14 m	Agnès Teppe (FRA)	55.80 m
Javelin throw (old model)	Anna Verouli (GRE)	60.34 m	Nadine Auzeil (FRA)	54.82 m	Aysel Taş (TUR)	54.34 m
Heptathlon (exhibition event)	Yasmina Azzizi (ALG)	6114 pts GR	Only one participant			

== Participation ==
Fifteen of the eighteen nations present at the 1991 edition of the games entered athletes into the athletics competition. Lebanon, Libya and Malta did not send any track and field athletes.

- Albania
- Algeria
- Cyprus
- Egypt
- France
- Greece
- Italy
- Morocco
- Monaco
- San Marino
- Spain
- Syria
- Tunisia
- Turkey
- Yugoslavia

== Men's results ==
=== 100 meters ===
Heats – 6 July
Wind: Heat 1: -1.1 m/s, Heat 2: -0.5 m/s

Rank	Heat	Name	Nationality	Time	Notes
1	1	Ezio Madonia	Italy	10.43	Q
5	1	Juan Jesús Trapero	Spain	10.59	q
3	2	Luis Rodríguez	Spain	10.64	Q
4	2	Giovanni Puggioni	Italy	10.69	

Final – 6 July
Wind: +0.4 m/s

Rank	Lane	Name	Nationality	Time	Notes
1st place, gold medalist(s)	4	Ezio Madonia	Italy	10.27	
2nd place, silver medalist(s)	6	Yannis Zisimedes	Cyprus	10.41	
3rd place, bronze medalist(s)	3	Cengiz Kavaklıoğlu	Turkey	10.44	
4	5	Driss Bensaddou	Morocco	10.45	
5	2	Éric Perrot	France	10.49	
6	8	Juan Jesús Trapero	Spain	10.54	
7	7	Antoine Richard	France	10.57	
8	1	Luis Rodríguez	Spain	10.59	

=== 200 meters ===
Heats – 10 July
Wind: Heat 1: +0.6 m/s, Heat 2: -1.9 m/s

Rank	Heat	Name	Nationality	Time	Notes
1	1	Stefano Tilli	Italy	20.96	Q
2	1	Miguel Ángel Gómez	Spain	21.02	Q
1	2	Sandro Floris	Italy	21.29	Q
4	2	Enrique Talavera	Spain	21.46	
5	2	Olivier Théophile	France	21.56	

Final – 10 July
Wind: -1.0 m/s

Rank	Lane	Name	Nationality	Time	Notes
1st place, gold medalist(s)	3	Stefano Tilli	Italy	20.73	
2nd place, silver medalist(s)	4	Miguel Ángel Gómez	Spain	20.76	
3rd place, bronze medalist(s)	6	Sandro Floris	Italy	20.96	
4	7	Aldo Canti	San Marino	21.02	
5	1	Mohamed El Kandoussi	Morocco	21.07	
6	5	Hermann Lomba	France	21.11	
7	8	Anninos Marcoullides	Cyprus	21.17	
8	2	Cengiz Kavaklıoğlu	Turkey	21.47	

=== 400 meters ===
Heats – 6 July

Rank	Heat	Name	Nationality	Time	Notes
2	2	Fabio Grossi	Italy	46.48	Q
4	1	Andrea Nuti	Italy	46.60	q
3	2	Antonio Sánchez	Spain	46.67	Q
5	1	Luis Cumellas	Spain	47.09	q
4	?	André Jaffory	France	47.29	

Final – 7 July

Rank	Lane	Name	Nationality	Time	Notes
1st place, gold medalist(s)	4	Olivier Noirot	France	45.41	
2nd place, silver medalist(s)	6	Fabio Grossi	Italy	45.93	
3rd place, bronze medalist(s)	5	Abdellali Kasbane	Morocco	45.99	
4	3	Benyounés Lahlou	Morocco	46.01	
5	2	Andrea Nuti	Italy	46.02	
6	8	Antonio Sánchez	Spain	46.63	
7	7	Luis Cumellas	Spain	47.05	
8	1	Amar Hacini	Algeria	47.28	

=== 800 meters ===
Heats – 6 July

Rank	Heat	Name	Nationality	Time	Notes
1	1	Andrea Benvenuti	Italy	1:49.65	Q
2	2	Luis Javier González	Spain	1:49.83	Q
3	2	Tonino Viali	Italy	1:49.90	Q
6	1	Alfredo Lahuerta	Spain	1:51.95	

Final – 7 July

Rank	Name	Nationality	Time	Notes
1st place, gold medalist(s)	Réda Abdenouz	Algeria	1:47.62	
2nd place, silver medalist(s)	Luis Javier González	Spain	1:47.84	
3rd place, bronze medalist(s)	Tonino Viali	Italy	1:47.86	
4	Frédéric Cornette	France	1:47.93	
5	Andrea Benvenuti	Italy	1:48.54	
6	Spyros Christopoulos	Greece	1:49.77	
7	Hamed Belkessam	Algeria	1:50.54	
8	Saïd Quaboudou	Morocco	1:52.12	

=== 1500 meters ===
11 July

Rank	Name	Nationality	Time	Notes
1st place, gold medalist(s)	Gennaro Di Napoli	Italy	3:42.80	
2nd place, silver medalist(s)	Rachid El Basir	Morocco	3:43.06	
3rd place, bronze medalist(s)	Zeki Öztürk	Turkey	3:43.22	
4	Abdelaziz Sahere	Morocco	3:43.31	
5	Davide Tirelli	Italy	3:43.37	
6	Ángel Fariña	Spain	3:43.85	
7	Mahmoud Kalboussi	Tunisia	3:44.24	
9	Víctor Rojas	Spain	3:45.44	

=== 5000 meters ===
10 July

Rank	Name	Nationality	Time	Notes
1st place, gold medalist(s)	Brahim Boutayeb	Morocco	13:29.64	GR
2nd place, silver medalist(s)	Khalid Skah	Morocco	13:30.00	
3rd place, bronze medalist(s)	Antonio Martins	France	13:38.08	
4	Zeki Öztürk	Turkey	13:51.79	
5	Stefano Baldini	Italy	13:53.15	
6	José Manuel García	Spain	13:54.24	
7	Emmanuel Chatzos	Greece	13:59.88	
8	Nihat Yaylalı	Turkey	14:07.30	

=== 10,000 meters ===
6 July

Rank	Name	Nationality	Time	Notes
1st place, gold medalist(s)	Hammou Boutayeb	Morocco	28:24.19	GR
2nd place, silver medalist(s)	Francesco Bennici	Italy	28:38.19	
3rd place, bronze medalist(s)	Khalid Boulami	Morocco	28:52.84	
4	Vincenzo Modica	Italy	28:70.09	
5	Mohamed Selmi	Algeria	28:80.97	
6	Emmanuel Chantzos	Greece	29:11.49	
7	Nihat Yaylalı	Turkey	29:23.80	
8	Savvas Koubaras	Greece	29:37.18	
9	Santiago Chiscano	Spain	29:57.52	

=== Marathon ===
9 July

Rank	Name	Nationality	Time	Notes
1st place, gold medalist(s)	Salah Qoqaiche	Morocco	2:20:26	
2nd place, silver medalist(s)	Gianluigi Curreli	Italy	2:20:54	
3rd place, bronze medalist(s)	Christos Sotiropoulos	Greece	2:24:54	
4	Grigoris Georgitsas	Greece	2:25:43	
5	Georgios Maliaris	Greece	2:25:55	
6	Georgios Afordakos	Greece	2:27:02	
7	Alberto Adamo	Italy	2:27:59	
8	Allaoua Khellil	Algeria	2:29:41	

=== 110 meters hurdles ===
Heats – 10 July
Wind: Heat 1: +1.1 m/s, Heat 2: -0.3 m/s

Rank	Heat	Name	Nationality	Time	Notes
1	1	Carlos Sala	Spain	13.80	Q
2	2	Luigi Bertocchi	Italy	13.93	Q
2	1	Fausto Frigerio	Italy	13.98	Q
3	2	Antonio Lanau	Spain	14.04	Q

Final – 10 July
Wind: +0.7 m/s

Rank	Lane	Name	Nationality	Time	Notes
1st place, gold medalist(s)	5	Dan Philibert	France	13.56	GR
2nd place, silver medalist(s)	6	Carlos Sala	Spain	13.64	
3rd place, bronze medalist(s)	4	Fausto Frigerio	Italy	13.72	
4	3	Luigi Bertocchi	Italy	13.79	
5	1	Stéphane Remion	France	13.89	
6	2	Grigoris Zagoras	Greece	14.03	
7	7	Ruhan Işım	Turkey	14.05	
8	8	Antonio Lanau	Spain	14.12	

=== 400 meters hurdles ===
Heats – 6 July

Rank	Heat	Name	Nationality	Time	Notes
2	1	Mauro Maurizi	Italy	49.94	Q
1	2	Luigi Bertocchi	Italy	50.99	Q

Final – 7 July

Rank	Lane	Name	Nationality	Time	Notes
1st place, gold medalist(s)	6	Stéphane Caristan	France	49.27	GR
2nd place, silver medalist(s)	1	Fabrizio Mori	Italy	49.85	
3rd place, bronze medalist(s)	3	Mauro Maurizi	Italy	50.05	
4	5	Ahmed Abdelhalim Ghanem	Egypt	50.32	
5	4	Fadhel Khayati	Tunisia	50.46	
6	8	Zid Abou Hamed	Syria	51.07	
7	2	Sylvain Moreau	France	51.61	
8	7	Suleiman Hawille	Syria	52.56	

=== 3000 meters steeplechase ===
8 July

Rank	Name	Nationality	Time	Notes
1st place, gold medalist(s)	Azzedine Brahmi	Algeria	8:21.58	
2nd place, silver medalist(s)	Alessandro Lambruschini	Italy	8:22.95	
3rd place, bronze medalist(s)	Abdelaziz Sahere	Morocco	8:24.15	
4	Thierry Brusseau	France	8:27.55	
5	Benito Nogales	Spain	8:28.55	
6	Antonio Peula	Spain	8:29.80	
7	Féthi Baccouche	Tunisia	8:30.36	
8	Angelo Carosi	Italy	8:35.84	

=== 4 x 100 meters relay ===
11 July

Rank	Lane	Nation	Competitors	Time	Notes
1st place, gold medalist(s)	5	Italy	Mario Longo, Carlo Simionato, Sandro Floris, Ezio Madonia	39.18	
2nd place, silver medalist(s)	6	Spain	Juan Jesús Trapero, Enrique Talavera, Miguel Ángel Gómez, Luis Turón	39.39	
3rd place, bronze medalist(s)	4	France	Antoine Richard, Éric Perrot, Olivier Théophile, Pascal Théophile	39.99	
4	8	Morocco	Mohamed Moudamane, Driss Bensaddou, Mohamed El Kandoussi, Benyounés Lahlou	40.32	
5	3	Greece	Markianidis, Konstadinos Labropoulos, Alexios Alexopoulos, Alexandros Yenovelis	40.44	
6	2	Cyprus	Konstantinos Pochanis, Anninos Marcoullides, Andreas Constantinides, Yannis Zisimedes	41.21	
7	7	San Marino	Nicola Selva, Marco Tamagnini, Dominique Canti, Aldo Canti	41.86	

=== 4 x 400 meters relay ===
11 July

Rank	Nation	Competitors	Time	Notes
1st place, gold medalist(s)	Italy	Marco Vaccari, Alessandro Aimar, Fabio Grossi, Andrea Nuti	3:03.20	GR
2nd place, silver medalist(s)	Yugoslavia	Dejan Jovković, Nenad Đurović, Ismail Mačev, Slobodan Branković	3:03.74	
3rd place, bronze medalist(s)	Morocco	Abdelail Kasbane, Ali Dahane, Bouchaib Belkaid, Benyounés Lahlou	3:03.75	
4	France	Jacques Farraudière, Thierry Jean Charles, André Jaffory, Laurent Le Bras	3:03.81	
5	Greece	Kharalambos Rethymniotakis, Vasilios Kalipossis, Bizioglis, Ioannis Nafpliotis	3:09.78	
6	San Marino	Dominique Canti, Aldo Canti, Marco Tamagnini, Manlio Molinari	3:24.38	

=== 20 kilometers walk ===
10 July

Rank	Name	Nationality	Time	Notes
1st place, gold medalist(s)	Maurizio Damilano	Italy	1:22:48	GR
2nd place, silver medalist(s)	Daniel Plaza	Spain	1:23:51	
3rd place, bronze medalist(s)	Olegario Regidor	Spain	1:26:45	
4	Spiros Kastanis	Greece	1:27:50	
5	Sergio Spagnolo	Italy	1:30:55	
6	Dimitrios Tsiris	Greece	1:32:16	
7	Abdelouahab Ferguene	Algeria	1:33:27	
8	Andreas Paspaliaris	Greece	1:33:33	

=== High jump ===
11 July

Rank	Name	Nationality	2.10	2.15	2.20	2.23	2.26	2.28	Result	Notes
1st place, gold medalist(s)	Othmane Belfaa	Algeria							2.28	GR, =AR
2nd place, silver medalist(s)	Luca Toso	Italy							2.26	
3rd place, bronze medalist(s)	Fabrizio Borellini	Italy							2.26	
4	Panagiotis Kontaxakis	Greece							2.23	
5	Labros Papakostas	Greece							2.20	
6	Joël Vincent	France							2.20	
7	Gustova Becquer	Spain	o	o	xo	xx–	x		2.20	
8	Jean-Charles Gicquel	France							2.15	

=== Pole vault ===
7 July

Rank	Name	Nationality	Result	Notes
1st place, gold medalist(s)	Philippe d'Encausse	France	5.60	GR
2nd place, silver medalist(s)	Jean-Marc Tailhardat	France	5.60	GR
3rd place, bronze medalist(s)	Marco Andreini	Italy	5.50	
4	Sazan Fisheku	Albania	5.40	
5	Stavros Tsitouras	Greece	5.30	
6	Christos Pallakis	Greece	5.30	
7	Gianni Iapichino	Italy	5.20	
8	Ruhan Işım	Turkey	5.20	

=== Long jump ===
8 July

Rank	Name	Nationality	#1	#2	#3	#4	#5	#6	Result	Notes
1st place, gold medalist(s)	Kostas Koukodimos	Greece	7.77	x	x	7.98	x	8.26	8.26	GR
2nd place, silver medalist(s)	Fausto Frigerio	Italy	x	7.83	8.15w				8.15w	
3rd place, bronze medalist(s)	Giovanni Evangelisti	Italy							7.89	
4	Murat Ayadin	Turkey							7.87	
5	Lotfi Khaida	Algeria							7.84	
6	Sinisa Ergotic	Yugoslavia							7.78	
7	Jesús Oliván	Spain	7.56	7.66	7.73	7.68	7.63	7.63	7.73	
8	Spyridon Vasdekis	Greece							7.58	
9	Frédéric Iola	France							7.29	

=== Triple jump ===
11 July

Rank	Name	Nationality	Result	Notes
1st place, gold medalist(s)	Marios Hadjiandreou	Cyprus	17.13	GR
2nd place, silver medalist(s)	Alex Norca	France	16.74	
3rd place, bronze medalist(s)	Lofti Khaïda	Algeria	16.64	
4	Theodoros Tantanozis	Greece	16.45	
5	Dario Badinelli	Italy	16.39	
6	Daniele Buttiglione	Italy	16.23	
7	Spyros Kourmoussis	Greece	16.04	
8	Murat Ayaydın	Turkey	15.62	
	Pierre Camara	France	NM	

=== Shot put ===
6 July

Rank	Name	Nationality	#1	#2	#3	#4	#5	#6	Result	Notes
1st place, gold medalist(s)	Alessandro Andrei	Italy							19.38	
2nd place, silver medalist(s)	Luciano Zerbini	Italy							19.25	
3rd place, bronze medalist(s)	Luc Viudès	France							19.05	
4	Dimitrios Koutsoukis	Greece							18.85	
5	Michalis Louca	Cyprus							17.88	
6	Elias Louca	Cyprus							16.80	
7	Ekren Ay	Turkey							16.63	
	Víctor Roca	Spain	x	x	x	x	x	x	NM	

=== Discus throw ===
10 July

Rank	Name	Nationality	#1	#2	#3	#4	#5	#6	Result	Notes
1st place, gold medalist(s)	Luciano Zerbini	Italy							60.10	
2nd place, silver medalist(s)	Marco Martino	Italy							59.82	
3rd place, bronze medalist(s)	David Martínez	Spain	55.82	x	x	57.54	59.16	x	59.16	
4	Jean Pons	France							57.12	
5	Alexandros Georgakopoulos	Greece							55.68	
6	Hassan Hamad	Egypt							54.32	
7	Christos Papadopoulos	Greece							53.40	
8	Dyia Kamel	Egypt							52.58	
9	Nikos Erotokritou	Cyprus							49.92	

=== Hammer throw ===
7 July

Rank	Name	Nationality	#1	#2	#3	#4	#5	#6	Result	Notes
1st place, gold medalist(s)	Raphaël Piolanti	France							75.10	
2nd place, silver medalist(s)	Enrico Sgrulletti	Italy							74.78	
3rd place, bronze medalist(s)	Savvas Saritzoglou	Greece							70.06	
4	Frederick Kuhn	France							69.94	
5	Lucio Serrani	Italy							69.62	
6	Antón María Godall	Spain	66.00	67.46	65.70	x	x		67.46	
7	Alex Marfull	Spain	65.76	66.42	x	65.64	64.12	64.30	66.42	
8	Cherif El Hennawi	Egypt							65.78	

=== Javelin throw ===
8 July

Rank	Name	Nationality	#1	#2	#3	#4	#5	#6	Result	Notes
1st place, gold medalist(s)	Julián Sotelo	Spain	70.62	71.08	76.04	x	x	x	76.04	GR, NR
2nd place, silver medalist(s)	Fabio De Gaspari	Italy							73.10	
3rd place, bronze medalist(s)	Charlus Bertimon	France							72.52	
4	Jean-Paul Lakafia	France							70.18	
5	Fikret Özsoy	Turkey							69.16	
6	Christakis Telonis	Greece							65.84	
	Athanasios Peristeris	Greece							NM	

=== Decathlon ===
8–9 July

The highest mark recorded in each event is highlighted in yellow

Rank	Athlete	Nationality	100m	LJ	SP	HJ	400m	110m H	DT	PV	JT	1500m	Points	Notes
1st place, gold medalist(s)	Saša Karan	Yugoslavia	11.12w	7.11	13.67	1.87	49.63	14.80	47.48	4.50	54.36	4:26.91	7771	GR
2nd place, silver medalist(s)	Alper Kasapoğlu	Turkey	11.00w	7.32	13.54	1.96	50.76	14.75	40.00	4.60	50.54	4:33.96	7650	
3rd place, bronze medalist(s)	Efthimios Andreoglou	Greece	11.28	7.21	11.21	2.20	52.37	14.98	33.04	4.70	55.86	4:34.15	7513	
4	Patrick Gellens	France	11.21	7.29	12.79	1.93	50.92	15.79	41.66	4.50	55.72	4:34.33	7469	
5	Fabrizio Rovini	Italy	11.37w	7.15w	12.31	2.11	50.73	16.46	38.22	4.60	50.40	4:45.22	7285	
6	Francisco Aledo	Spain	11.54	6.87	13.59	1.93	51.26	15.61	39.16	4.20	55.22	4:29.83	7237	
7	Mihalis Simitsis	Greece	11.32w	7.10	11.96	1.93	51.93	16.56	38.92	4.10	49.48	4:43.54	6899	
8	Theofanis Georgiou	Cyprus											6565	

== Women's results ==
=== 100 meters ===
Heats – 6 July
Wind: Heat 1: +0.3 m/s, Heat 2: -0.2 m/s

Rank	Heat	Name	Nationality	Time	Notes
2	2	Cristina Castro	Spain	11.61	Q
3	1	Marisa Masullo	Italy	11.80	Q
3	2	Sonia Vigati	Italy	11.90	Q
5	1	Yolanda Díaz	Spain	12.05	q

Final – 6 July
Wind: +0.3 m/s

Rank	Lane	Name	Nationality	Time	Notes
1st place, gold medalist(s)	4	Paraskevi Patoulidou	Greece	11.48	
2nd place, silver medalist(s)	5	Maguy Nestoret	France	11.50	
3rd place, bronze medalist(s)	6	Magalie Simioneck	France	11.53	
4	3	Marisa Masullo	Italy	11.59	
5	4	Cristina Castro	Spain	11.61	
6	8	Sonia Vigati	Italy	11.92	
7	1	Yolanda Díaz	Spain	11.94	
8	7	Latifa Lahsen	Morocco	11.96	

=== 200 meters ===
Heats – 8 July
Wind: Heat 1: -2.0 m/s, Heat 2: +2.2 m/s

Rank	Heat	Name	Nationality	Time	Notes
1	1	Marisa Masullo	Italy	23.80	Q
2	2	Rossella Tarolo	Italy	23.94	Q
3	1	Cristina Castro	Spain	24.29	Q
4	2	Gregoria Ferrer	Spain	24.32	q

Final – 8 July
Wind: +0.2 m/s

Rank	Lane	Name	Nationality	Time	Notes
1st place, gold medalist(s)	5	Marisa Masullo	Italy	23.21	GR
2nd place, silver medalist(s)	3	Fabienne Ficher	France	23.40	
3rd place, bronze medalist(s)	4	Valérie Jean-Charles	France	23.52	
4	6	Rossella Tarolo	Italy	23.53	
5	7	Cristina Castro	Spain	23.91	
6	2	Marina Vasarmidou	Greece	24.19	
7	8	Gregoria Ferrer	Spain	24.33	
8	1	Stalo Constantinou	Cyprus	24.61	

=== 400 meters ===
Heats – 6 July

Rank	Heat	Name	Nationality	Time	Notes
2	1	Cosetta Campana	Italy	54.52	Q
1	2	Julia Merino	Spain	54.96	Q
3	1	Esther Lahoz	Spain	55.20	Q
4	2	Roberta Rabaioli	Italy	56.77	q

Final – 7 July

Rank	Name	Nationality	Time	Notes
1st place, gold medalist(s)	Julia Merino	Spain	51.88	GR
2nd place, silver medalist(s)	Véronique Poulain	France	52.85	
3rd place, bronze medalist(s)	Francine Landre	France	53.43	
4	Esther Lahoz	Spain	53.47	
5	Marina Vasarmidou	Greece	53.78	
6	Cosetta Campana	Italy	53.86	
7	Roberta Rabaioli	Italy	55.00	
8	Eleftheria Papadopoulou	Greece	55.69	

=== 800 meters ===
8 July

Rank	Name	Nationality	Time	Notes
1st place, gold medalist(s)	Hassiba Boulmerka	Algeria	2:01.27	
2nd place, silver medalist(s)	Frédérique Quentin	France	2:01.51	
3rd place, bronze medalist(s)	Nadia Falvo	Italy	2:02.58	
4	Irini Theodoridou	Greece	2:02.69	
5	Amaya Andrés	Spain	2:03.65	
6	Najat Ouali	Morocco	2:06.25	
7	Patrizia Cassard	Italy	2:06.80	
8	Karolina Skourti	Greece	2:10.13	
9	Chadia Moubtakir	Morocco	2:10.73	

=== 1500 meters ===
11 July

Rank	Name	Nationality	Time	Notes
1st place, gold medalist(s)	Hassiba Boulmerka	Algeria	4:08.17	
2nd place, silver medalist(s)	Irini Theodoridou	Greece	4:10.30	
3rd place, bronze medalist(s)	Gabriella Dorio	Italy	4:10.63	
4	Elisa Rea	Italy	4:12.67	
5	Najat Ouali	Morocco	4:17.07	
6	Karolina Skourti	Greece	4:32.86	
7	Marie-Cécile Rivetta	Monaco	5:23.92	

=== 3000 meters ===
8 July

Rank	Name	Nationality	Time	Notes
1st place, gold medalist(s)	Roberta Brunet	Italy	8:45.68	GR
2nd place, silver medalist(s)	Nadia Dandolo	Italy	8:46.94	
3rd place, bronze medalist(s)	Mina Maanaoui	Morocco	9:22.94	
4	Georgia Abatzidou	Greece	9:30.80	
5	Dudu Yentür	Turkey	9:40.64	
6	Dimitra Anagnostou	Greece	10:07.73	
	Fatima Aouam	Morocco	DNF	

=== 100 meters hurdles ===
7 July
Wind: +0.2 m/s

Rank	Name	Nationality	Time	Notes
1st place, gold medalist(s)	Anne Piquereau	France	12.88	GR
2nd place, silver medalist(s)	Paraskevi Patoulidou	Greece	12.96	
3rd place, bronze medalist(s)	Maria José Mardomingo	Spain	13.34	
4	Nezha Bidouane	Morocco	13.61	
5	Ana Barrenechea	Spain	13.68	

=== 400 meters hurdles ===
Heats – 8 July

Rank	Heat	Name	Nationality	Time	Notes
1	1	Irmgard Trojer	Italy	56.65	Q
2	2	Elena Zamperioli	Italy	57.93	Q
3	2	Idoia Granda	Spain	59.20	Q

Final – 10 July

Rank	Lane	Name	Nationality	Time	Notes
1st place, gold medalist(s)	3	Nezha Bidouane	Morocco	55.13	GR
2nd place, silver medalist(s)	4	Irmgard Trojer	Italy	55.42	
3rd place, bronze medalist(s)	6	Nadia Zatouani	Morocco	57.57	
4	5	Elena Zamperioli	Italy	58.07	
5	2	Idoia Granda	Spain	58.36	
6	7	Chionati Kapeti	Greece	58.58	
7	1	Yolanda Tello	Spain	59.04	
8	8	Maria Belehri	Greece	59.33	

=== 4 x 100 meters relay ===
11 July

Rank	Lane	Nation	Competitors	Time	Notes
1st place, gold medalist(s)	2	France	Magalie Simioneck, Maguy Nestoret, Valérie Jean-Charles, Fabienne Fisher	43.66	
2nd place, silver medalist(s)	3	Italy	Marisa Masullo, Donatella Dal Bianco, Daniela Ferrian, Rossela Tarolo	43.67	
3rd place, bronze medalist(s)	4	Greece	Kanelidou, Ekaterini Koffa, Marina Vasarmidou, Paraskevi Patoulidou	44.77	
4	6	Morocco	Hasnae Atillah, Latifa Lahsen, Nadia Zatouani, Nezha Bidouane	46.05	
	5	Spain	María Paz Minicozzi, Cristina Castro, Yolanda Díaz, María del Carmen García Campero	DQ	

=== 4 x 400 meters relay ===
11 July

Rank	Nation	Competitors	Time	Notes
1st place, gold medalist(s)	France	Elsa Devassoigne, Véronique Poulain, Véronique Landre, Fabienne Fisher	3:31.00	GR
2nd place, silver medalist(s)	Italy	Roberta Rabaioli, Johanna Zuddas, Barbara Martinelli, Cosetta Campana	3:33.68	
3rd place, bronze medalist(s)	Spain	Idoia Granda, Gregoria Ferrer, Amaia Andrés, Esther Lahoz	3:34.21	
4	Morocco	Nadia Zatouani, Chadia Moubtakir, Latifa Lahseńs, Nezha Bidouane	3:39.46	
5	Greece	Maria Belehri, Podi, Chionati Kapetís, Eleftheria Papadopoulou	3:45.59	

=== High jump ===
10 July

Rank	Name	Nationality	Result	Notes
1st place, gold medalist(s)	Isabelle Chevalier	France	1.90	
2nd place, silver medalist(s)	Niki Gavera	Greece	1.87	
3rd place, bronze medalist(s)	Niki Bakoyianni	Greece	1.87	
4	Barbara Fiammenga	Italy	1.87	
5	Antonella Bevilacqua	Italy	1.84	
6	Klodeta Gjini	Albania	1.84	
6	Agni Charalambos	Cyprus	1.75	

=== Long jump ===
6 July

Rank	Name	Nationality	#1	#2	#3	#4	#5	#6	Result	Notes
1st place, gold medalist(s)	Tamara Malešev	Yugoslavia							6.60	GR
2nd place, silver medalist(s)	Valentina Ucchedu	Italy							6.52	
3rd place, bronze medalist(s)	Isabel López	Spain	x	6.14	x	5.50	6.00w	5.99	6.14	
4	Vera Bregu	Albania							6.08	
5	Panagiota Bisbiki	Greece							6.02	
6	Christiana Philippou	Cyprus							5.63	
7	Hasna El Atillah	Morocco							5.60	

=== Shot put ===
10 July

Rank	Name	Nationality	#1	#2	#3	#4	#5	#6	Result	Notes
1st place, gold medalist(s)	Margarita Ramos	Spain	16.86	17.15	17.71	x	16.95	x	17.71	NR
2nd place, silver medalist(s)	Agnese Maffaeis	Italy							17.46	
3rd place, bronze medalist(s)	Mara Rosolen	Italy							15.95	
4	Hana Khaled	Egypt							15.50	
5	Elli Evangelidou	Cyprus							15.21	
6	Fouzia Fatihi	Morocco							15.04	
7	Eleni Tsedemidou	Greece							14.85	

=== Discus throw ===
10 July

Rank	Name	Nationality	#1	#2	#3	#4	#5	#6	Result	Notes
1st place, gold medalist(s)	Agnese Maffaeis	Italy							59.46	GR
2nd place, silver medalist(s)	Isabelle Devaluez	France							56.14	
3rd place, bronze medalist(s)	Agnès Teppe	France							55.80	
4	Angeles Barreira	Spain	53.24	x	53.78	53.76	52.72	54.76	54.76	
5	Maria Marello	Italy							53.82	
6	Zoubida Laayouni	Morocco							53.22	
7	Sonia Godall	Spain	52.30	x	52.20	x	52.70	x	52.70	
8	Katerina Vogoli	Greece							51.26	

=== Javelin throw ===
11 July

Rank	Name	Nationality	#1	#2	#3	#4	#5	#6	Result	Notes
1st place, gold medalist(s)	Anna Verouli	Greece							60.34	
2nd place, silver medalist(s)	Nadine Auzeil	France							54.82	
3rd place, bronze medalist(s)	Aysel Taş	Turkey							54.34	
4	Chryso Georgiou	Cyprus							53.56	
5	Veronica Becuzzi	Italy							52.02	
6	Elena Teloni	Cyprus							49.20	
7	Fausta Quintavalla	Italy							48.30	
8	Belén Palacios	Spain	46.02	x	x	43.48	42.96	42.42	46.02	
9	Martine Bègue	France							44.32	

=== Heptathlon (exhibition) ===
10/11 July

Rank	Name	Nationality	Result	Notes
1st place, gold medalist(s)	Yasmina Azzizi	Algeria	6114	AR
