= Athletics at the 1993 Mediterranean Games =

1993 Athletics at the Mediterranean Games

Athletics at the XII Mediterranean Games
- Dates: 17–20 June
- Host city: Narbonne, Languedoc-Roussillon, France
- Venue: Parc des Sports Et de l'Amitié
- Events: 36
- Participation: 13 nations
- Records set: 7 Games records

At the 1993 Mediterranean Games, the athletics events were held in Narbonne, Languedoc-Roussillon, France from 17–24 June 1993. A total of 36 events were contested, of which 20 by male and 16 by female athletes.

The host nation France easily topped the medal table, taking 15 gold medals and 38 medals overall (over a third of the total). Italy was the next most successful nation, with six golds among its 16 medals. Greece and Morocco was third and fourth, respectively, each having won four gold medals. Of the thirteen nations who entered athletes into the tournament, only Albania and Cyprus did not reach the medal table.

The event programme was reduced for the 1993 games: the women's 4×400 metres relay and the men's hammer throw, decathlon and 20 kilometres walk competitions were not held that year. The women's marathon was contested for the first time, while the women's 3000 metres was held for the last time (later being replaced by the 5000 metres event).

Noureddine Morceli won the men's 1500 metres in a time of 3:29.20 minutes – the second fastest time at that point, after his own world record. He was one of eight athletes to break a Mediterranean Games record at the 1993 edition. Zid Abou Hamed set both a games and Syrian national record in the men's 400 metres hurdles. The marathon races saw Davide Milesi and Helena Javornik establish new bests. Greek runner Alexandros Terzian broke the men's 100 metres record, while a new best of 6256 points for the heptathlon was set by Nathalie Teppe (also the javelin throw gold medallist).

The competition was part of the buildup to the 1993 World Championships in Athletics. Morceli and Fermín Cacho repeated their Mediterranean 1–2 in the men's 1500 m, but reigning women's Olympic champion Hassiba Boulmerka (800 m winner and 1500 m runner-up in Narbonne) was relegated to the bronze medal in her final. The Mediterranean and Olympic champion in the 10,000 metres, Khalid Skah, was out of the medal in the world 5000 m final.

The event saw future Olympic champions Konstantinos Kenteris, Jean Galfione and Ghada Shouaa get their first senior outdoor medals. Brigita Bukovec went on to an Olympic silver in 1996 after her 100 metres hurdles win in Narbonne, while Nezha Bidouane defended her Mediterranean 400 m hurdles title and would later become a double world champion in the event.

== Medal table ==
* Host nation (France)

Rank	Nation	Gold	Silver	Bronze	Total
1	France*	15	13	10	38
2	Italy	6	5	5	16
3	Greece	4	6	3	13
4	Morocco	4	3	5	12
5	Slovenia	3	2	2	7
6	Algeria	2	3	2	7
7	Syria	1	1	0	2
8	Croatia	1	0	1	2
9	Spain	0	2	6	8
10	Turkey	0	1	0	1
11	Tunisia	0	0	2	2
Totals (11 entries)		36	36	36	108

== Medal summary ==
=== Men ===
Event	Gold		Silver		Bronze	
100 metres (wind: +1.4 m/s)	Alexandros Terzian (GRE)	10.20	Jean-Charles Trouabal (FRA)	10.24	Daniel Sangouma (FRA)	10.35
200 metres (wind: -1.8 m/s)	Daniel Sangouma (FRA)	20.76	Alexandros Terzian (GRE)	20.87	Mohamed El Kandoussi (MAR)	21.04
400 metres	Konstantinos Kenteris (GRE)	45.70	Jean-Louis Rapnouil (FRA)	45.91	Benyounés Lahlou (MAR)	45.91
800 metres	Mahjoub Haïda (MAR)	1:48.70	Fotis Deligiannis (GRE)	1:49.03	Réda Abdenouz (ALG)	1:49.45
1500 metres	Noureddine Morceli (ALG)	3:29.20 GR	Fermín Cacho (ESP)	3:32.43	Rachid El Basir (MAR)	3:37.30
5000 metres	Thierry Pantel (FRA)	13:39.04	Aïssa Belaout (ALG)	13:41.65	Mohammed Mourhit (MAR)	13:50.12
10,000 metres	Khalid Skah (MAR)	28:46.38	Hammou Boutayeb (MAR)	28:49.94	Vincenzo Modica (ITA)	28:55.97
110 metres hurdles	Dan Philibert (FRA)	13.62	Stelios Bisbas (GRE)	13.67	Mustapha Sdad (MAR)	13.80
400 metres hurdles	Zid Abou Hamed (SYR)	49.09 GR, NR	Giorgio Frinolli (ITA)	49.51	Fadhel Khayati (TUN)	49.94
3000 metres steeplechase	Abdelaziz Sahere (MAR)	8:25.74	Azzedine Brahmi (ALG)	8:28.87	Thierry Brusseau (FRA)	8:33.27
4×100 metres relay	France (FRA); Max Morinière; Daniel Sangouma; Jean-Charles Trouabal; Bruno Marie-Rose	38.96	Greece (GRE); Alexandros Yenovelis; Georgios Panagiotopoulos; Alexios Alexopoulos; Alexandros Terzian	39.26	Spain (ESP); Luis Turón; Pedro Pablo Nolet; Jordi Mayoral; José Rivas	39.90
4×400 metres relay	France (FRA); André Jaffory; Pierre-Marie Hilaire; Stéphane Diagana; Jean-Louis Rapnouil	3:02.99 GR	Morocco (MAR); Ali Dahane; Abdellah Boukraa; Abdelkader El Boukhari; Benyounés Lahlou	3:04.79	Italy (ITA); Maurizio Federici; Vito Petrella; Gianrico Boncompagni; Alessandro Aimar	3:05.11
Marathon	Davide Milesi (ITA)	2:18:42 GR	Cihangir Demirel (TUR)	2:18:43	Marco Toini (ITA)	2:18:59
High jump	Jean-Charles Gicquel (FRA)	2.26 m	Gustavo Becker (ESP)	2.23 m	Miha Prijon (SLO)	2.23 m
Pole vault	Stavros Tsitouras (GRE)	5.55 m	Thierry Vigneron (FRA)	5.50 m	Jean Galfione (FRA)	5.35 m
Long jump	Spyridon Vasdekis (GRE)	8.03 m (w)	Georgios Zabetakis (GRE)	7.91 m	Serge Hélan (FRA)	7.89 m (w)
Triple jump	Pierre Camara (FRA)	17.03 m	Georges Sainte-Rose (FRA)	17.00 m (w)	Lotfi Khaïda (ALG)	16.88 m (w)
Shot put	Paolo Dal Soglio (ITA)	20.22 m	Alessandro Andrei (ITA)	19.37 m	Dimitrios Koutsoukis (GRE)	18.83 m
Discus throw	Luciano Zerbini (ITA)	60.90 m	Jean Pons (FRA)	57.58 m	Jean-Claude Retel (FRA)	57.22 m
Javelin throw	Ivan Mustapić (CRO)	79.46 m GR	Fabio De Gaspari (ITA)	77.18 m	Konstadinos Gatsioudis (GRE)	77.00 m

=== Women ===
Event	Gold		Silver		Bronze	
100 metres (wind: +0.8 m/s)	Magali Simioneck (FRA)	11.39	Odiah Sidibé (FRA)	11.49	Ekaterini Koffa (GRE)	11.71
200 metres (wind: -1.3 m/s)	Maguy Nestoret (FRA)	23.42	Valérie Jean-Charles (FRA)	23.45	Donatella Dal Bianco (ITA)	24.12
400 metres	Elsa Devassoigne (FRA)	52.44	Francine Landre (FRA)	52.95	Francesca Carbone (ITA)	53.78
800 metres	Hassiba Boulmerka (ALG)	2:03.86	Fabia Trabaldo (ITA)	2:04.05	Amaia Andrés (ESP)	2:05.16
1500 metres	Frédérique Quentin (FRA)	4:11.09	Hassiba Boulmerka (ALG)	4:11.09	Farida Fatès (FRA)	4:12.60
3000 metres	Valentina Tauceri (ITA)	9:00.10	Annette Sergent-Palluy (FRA)	9:02.96	Julia Vaquero (ESP)	9:04.99
100 metres hurdles (wind: -0.8 m/s)	Brigita Bukovec (SLO)	13.10	Cécile Cinélu (FRA)	13.17	Patricia Girard (FRA)	13.19
400 metres hurdles	Nezha Bidouane (MAR)	56.09	Nadia Zétouani (MAR)	57.04	Carole Nelson (FRA)	57.45
4×100 metres relay	France (FRA); Patricia Girard; Odiah Sidibé; Maguy Nestoret; Valérie Jean-Charles	43.55	Italy (ITA); Elisabetta Birolini; Giuseppina Perlino; Annarita Balzani; Laura Ardissone	45.62	Spain (ESP); Ana Barrenechea; Carmen García; Patricia Morales; Mireia Ruiz	45.93
Marathon	Helena Javornik (SLO)	2:42:58 GR	Marie-Hélène Ohier (FRA)	2:43:26	Sylviane Geffray (FRA)	2:43:40
High jump	Britta Bilač (SLO)	1.92 m	Nathalie Lefebvre (FRA)	1.87 m	María Mar Martínez (ESP)	1.84 m
Long jump	Corinne Hérigault (FRA)	6.54 m (w)	Ksenija Predikaka (SLO)	6.51 m (w)	Silvija Babić (CRO)	6.45 m (w)
Shot put	Agnese Maffeis (ITA)	17.04 m	Nataša Erjavec (SLO)	16.88 m	Margarita Ramos (ESP)	16.86 m
Discus throw	Agnese Maffeis (ITA)	57.16 m	Ekaterini Voggoli (GRE)	56.10 m	Monia Kari (TUN)	55.38 m
Javelin throw	Nathalie Teppe (FRA)	60.90 m	Nadine Auzeil (FRA)	59.68 m	Renata Strašek (SLO)	59.04 m
Heptathlon	Nathalie Teppe (FRA)	6256 pts GR	Ghada Shouaa (SYR)	6168 pts	Odile Lesage (FRA)	5888 pts

== Participation ==
Thirteen of the nineteen nations participating at the games entered athletes into the athletics competition.

- Albania
- Algeria
- Croatia
- Cyprus
- France
- Greece
- Italy
- Morocco
- Slovenia
- Spain
- Syria
- Tunisia
- Turkey

== Men's results ==
=== 100 meters ===
Heats – 17 June
Wind: Heat 1: +1.5 m/s, Heat 2: +0.6 m/s

Rank	Heat	Name	Nationality	Time	Notes
?	?	Daniel Sangouma	France	10.34	Q
2	1	Mario Longo	Italy	10.41	Q
4	2	Andrea Amici	Italy	10.55	
7	1	José Carlos Rivas	Spain	10.70	
6	2	Luis Turón	Spain	10.70	

Final – 17 June
Wind: +1.4 m/s

Rank	Lane	Name	Nationality	Time	Notes
1st place, gold medalist(s)	3	Alexandros Terzian	Greece	10.20	NR
2nd place, silver medalist(s)	6	Jean-Charles Trouabal	France	10.24	
3rd place, bronze medalist(s)	4	Daniel Sangouma	France	10.35	
4	1	Yiannis Zisimidis	Cyprus	10.35	
5	2	Alexandros Yenovelis	Greece	10.41	
6	8	Driss Bensadou	Morocco	10.46	
7	5	Mario Longo	Italy	10.48	
8	7	Anninos Markoullidis	Cyprus	10.52	

=== 200 meters ===
Heats – 18 June
Wind: Heat 2: -2.3 m/s

Rank	Heat	Name	Nationality	Time	Notes
2	2	Giovanni Puggioni	Italy	21.41	Q
6	2	Jordi Mayoral	Spain	21.56	q
4	1	Rocco Ceselin	Italy	22.09	
5	1	Pedro Pablo Nolet	Spain	22.19	
	?	Gilles Quénéhervé	France	DQ	

Final – 18 June
Wind: -1.8 m/s

Rank	Lane	Name	Nationality	Time	Notes
1st place, gold medalist(s)	6	Daniel Sangouma	France	20.76	
2nd place, silver medalist(s)	8	Alexandros Terzian	Greece	20.87	
3rd place, bronze medalist(s)	2	Mohamed El Kandoussi	Morocco	21.04	
4	5	Giovanni Puggioni	Italy	21.12	
5	3	Georgios Panagiotopoulos	Greece	21.13	
6	7	Jordi Mayoral	Spain	21.28	
7	4	Abdelkader El Boukhari	Morocco	21.36	
8	1	Anninos Markoullidis	Cyprus	21.55	

=== 400 meters ===
Heats – 17 June

Rank	Heat	Name	Nationality	Time	Notes
?	?	Olivier Noirot	France	46.50	Q
4	1	Gianrico Boncompagni	Italy	47.09	Q
4	2	Alessandro Aimar	Italy	47.34	Q

Final – 18 June

Rank	Name	Nationality	Time	Notes
1st place, gold medalist(s)	Konstantinos Kenteris	Greece	45.70	
2nd place, silver medalist(s)	Jean-Louis Rapnouil	France	45.91	
2nd place, silver medalist(s)	Benyounés Lahlou	Morocco	45.91	
4	Sadek Boumendil	Algeria	46.36	
5	Amar Hecini	Algeria	46.97	
6	Olivier Noirot	France	47.13	
7	Gianrico Boncompagni	Italy	47.41	
8	Alessandro Aimar	Italy	47.45	

=== 800 meters ===
Heats – 17 June

Rank	Heat	Name	Nationality	Time	Notes
?	?	Frédéric Sillé	France	1:49.48	Q
4	2	José Arconada	Spain	1:49.93	q
5	2	Marco Chiavarini	Italy	1:50.61	

Final – 18 June

Rank	Name	Nationality	Time	Notes
1st place, gold medalist(s)	Mahjoub Haïda	Morocco	1:48.70	
2nd place, silver medalist(s)	Fotios Deligiannis	Greece	1:49.03	
3rd place, bronze medalist(s)	Réda Abdenouz	Algeria	1:49.45	
4	José Arconada	Spain	1:49.63	
5	Panagiotis Stroumbakos	Greece	1:49.92	
6	Rafko Marinič	Slovenia	1:50.08	
7	Frédéric Sillé	France	1:51.96	

=== 1500 meters ===
20 June

Rank	Name	Nationality	Time	Notes
1st place, gold medalist(s)	Noureddine Morceli	Algeria	3:29.20	GR
2nd place, silver medalist(s)	Fermín Cacho	Spain	3:32.43	
3rd place, bronze medalist(s)	Rachid El Basir	Morocco	3:37.30	
4	Pascal Thiébaut	France	3:38.25	
5	Davide Tirelli	Italy	3:38.41	
6	Mohamed Taki	Morocco	3:38.53	
7	Manuel Pancorbo	Spain	3:38.56	
8	Amos Rota	Italy	3:44.52	
9	Samir Benfarès	France	3:46.20	

=== 5000 meters ===
20 June

Rank	Name	Nationality	Time	Notes
1st place, gold medalist(s)	Thierry Pantel	France	13:39.04	
2nd place, silver medalist(s)	Aïssa Belaout	Algeria	13:41.65	
3rd place, bronze medalist(s)	Mohammed Mourhit	Morocco	13:50.12	
4	Salah Hissou	Morocco	13:55.31	
5	Stefano Baldini	Italy	14:06.69	
6	Kamel Kohil	Algeria	14:12.47	
7	Teodoro Cuñado	Spain	14:22.61	
8	Georgios Loukaidis	Cyprus	14:52.51	

=== 10,000 meters ===
Rank	Name	Nationality	Time	Notes
1st place, gold medalist(s)	Khalid Skah	Morocco	28:46.38	
2nd place, silver medalist(s)	Brahim Boutayeb	Morocco	28:49.94	
3rd place, bronze medalist(s)	Vincenzo Modica	Italy	28:55.97	
4	Christian Leuprecht	Italy	29:42.31	
5	Sid-Ali Sakhri	Algeria	29:45.93	
6	Jean-Louis Prianon	France	29:52.72	
7	Stelios Marneros	Cyprus	32:58.75	

=== Marathon ===
20 June

Rank	Name	Nationality	Time	Notes
1st place, gold medalist(s)	Davide Milesi	Italy	2:18:42	GR
2nd place, silver medalist(s)	Cihangir Demirel	Turkey	2:18:43	
3rd place, bronze medalist(s)	Marco Toini	Italy	2:18:59	
4	Mimoun Lamhajar	Morocco	2:19:45	
5	Mohamed Salmi	Algeria	2:19:52	
6	Jean-Baptiste Protais	France	2:20:36	
7	Tahar Mansouri	Tunisia	2:21:02	
8	Chaouki Achour	Algeria	2:21:34	
11	Michel Humbert	France	2:34:41	
12	Jean-Yves Berau	France	2:37:28	

=== 110 meters hurdles ===
Rank	Lane	Name	Nationality	Time	Notes
1st place, gold medalist(s)	4	Dan Philibert	France	13.62	
2nd place, silver medalist(s)	3	Stelios Bisbas	Greece	13.67	
3rd place, bronze medalist(s)	7	Mustapha Sdad	Morocco	13.80	
4	2	Fausto Frigerio	Italy	13.88	
5	5	Luigi Bertocchi	Italy	13.96	
6	6	Vincent Clarico	France	13.98	
7	1	Nedeljko Višnjić	Croatia	14.41	
8	8	Alper Kasapoğlu	Turkey	15.45	

=== 400 meters hurdles ===
Heats – 18 June

Rank	Heat	Name	Nationality	Time	Notes
1	1	Giorgio Frinolli	Italy	49.86	Q
4	2	Paolo Bellino	Italy	50.14	q
5	1	Óscar Pitillas	Spain	51.14	
6	2	David Niaré	France	51.31	
6	?	Salvador Vila	Spain	51.64	

Final – 19 June

Rank	Lane	Name	Nationality	Time	Notes
1st place, gold medalist(s)	1	Zid Abou Hamed	Syria	49.09	GR
2nd place, silver medalist(s)	6	Giorgio Frinolli	Italy	49.51	
3rd place, bronze medalist(s)	3	Fadhel Khayati	Tunisia	49.94	
4	5	Miro Kocuvan	Slovenia	50.13	
5	4	Abdelhak Lahlali	Morocco	50.26	
6	2	Paolo Bellino	Italy	50.50	
7	7	Athanasios Kalogiannis	Greece	50.64	
8	8	Stéphane Caristan	France	50.66	

=== 3000 meters steeplechase ===
19 June

Rank	Name	Nationality	Time	Notes
1st place, gold medalist(s)	Abdelaziz Sahere	Morocco	8:25.24	
2nd place, silver medalist(s)	Azzedine Brahmi	Algeria	8:25.24	
3rd place, bronze medalist(s)	Thierry Brusseau	France	8:33.27	
4	Fabien Lacan	France	8:37.87	
5	Elarbi Khattabi	Morocco	8:39.23	
6	Francisco Munuera	Spain	8:40.27	
7	Nikolaos Vouzis	Greece	8:40.76	
8	Ramiro Morán	Spain	8:46.62	
9	Gianni Crepaldi	Italy	8:53.16	

=== 4 × 100 meters relay ===
20 June

Rank	Lane	Nation	Competitors	Time	Notes
1st place, gold medalist(s)	6	France	Max Morinière, Daniel Sangouma, Jean-Charles Trouabal, Bruno Marie-Rose	38.96	
2nd place, silver medalist(s)	7	Greece	Alexandros Yenovelis, Georgios Panagiotopoulos, Alexios Alexopoulos, Alexandros Terzian	39.26	
3rd place, bronze medalist(s)	5	Spain	Luis Turón, Pedro Pablo Nolet, Jordi Mayoral, José Carlos Rivas	39.90	
4	4	Italy	Rocco Ceselin, Andrea Amici, Toni Fischetti, Mario Longo	40.03	
5	3	Morocco	Mohamed Toudamane, Abdelkader El Boukhari, Mohamed El Kandoussi, Driss Bensadou	40.22	
6	2	Cyprus	Periklis Markaris, Anninos Markoullidis, Kostas Pochanis, Yiannis Zisimidis	40.57	

=== 4 × 400 meters relay ===
20 June

Rank	Nation	Competitors	Time	Notes
1st place, gold medalist(s)	France	André Jaffory, Pierre-Marie Hilaire, Stéphane Diagana, Jean-Louis Rapnouil	3:02.99	GR
2nd place, silver medalist(s)	Morocco	Ali Dahhan, Abdellah Boukraa, Abdelkader El Boukhari, Benyounés Lahlou	3:04.79	
3rd place, bronze medalist(s)	Italy	Maurizio Federici, Vito Petrella, Gianrico Boncompagni, Alessandro Aimar	3:05.11	
4	Algeria	Kamel Talhaoui, Amar Hecini, Ismail Mohamed Mariche, Sadek Boumendil	3:08.03	
5	Cyprus	Yiannakis Kleanthous, Anninos Markoullidis, Kostas Pochanis, Evripidis Dimosthenous	3:14.45	

=== High jump ===
18 June

Rank	Name	Nationality	2.10	2.15	2.20	2.23	2.26	Result	Notes
1st place, gold medalist(s)	Jean-Charles Gicquel	France						2.26	
2nd place, silver medalist(s)	Gustavo Adolfo Becker	Spain	–	o	xo	o	xxx	2.23	
3rd place, bronze medalist(s)	Miha Prijon	Slovenia						2.23	
4	Dimitrios Kokotis	Greece						2.20	
5	Frédéric Derisbourg	France						2.15	
6	Neofytos Kalogerou	Cyprus						2.10	

=== Pole vault ===
20 June

Rank	Name	Nationality	5.00	5.20	5.35	5.50	5.55	Result	Notes
1st place, gold medalist(s)	Stavros Tsitouras	Greece						5.55	
2nd place, silver medalist(s)	Thierry Vigneron	France						5.50	
3rd place, bronze medalist(s)	Jean Galfione	France						5.35	
4	Massimo Allevi	Italy						5.35	
5	Ruhan Işım	Turkey						5.00	
6	Fotis Stefani	Cyprus						5.00	
	Daniel Martí	Spain	–	xxx				NM	

=== Long jump ===
18 June

Rank	Name	Nationality	#1	#2	#3	#4	#5	#6	Result	Notes
1st place, gold medalist(s)	Spyridon Vasdekis	Greece							8.03w	
2nd place, silver medalist(s)	Georgios Zabetakis	Greece							7.91	
3rd place, bronze medalist(s)	Serge Hélan	France							7.89w	
4	Gianni Iapichino	Italy							7.87	
5	Milko Campus	Italy							7.84	
6	Franck Lestage	France							7.80	
7	Lotfi Khaïda	Algeria							7.78	
8	Jesús Oliván	Spain	7.76w	x	7.76	x	x	x	7.76w	

=== Triple jump ===
19 June

Rank	Name	Nationality	#1	#2	#3	#4	#5	#6	Result	Notes
1st place, gold medalist(s)	Pierre Camara	France							17.03	
2nd place, silver medalist(s)	Georges Sainte-Rose	France							17.00	
3rd place, bronze medalist(s)	Lotfi Khaïda	Algeria							16.88	
4	Theodoros Tantanozis	Greece							16.56	
5	Júlio López	Spain	16.38	x	x	x	x	16.38		
6	Daniele Buttiglione	Italy							16.10	
7	Maurizio Gifaldi	Italy							15.93	

=== Shot put ===
17 June

Rank	Name	Nationality	#1	#2	#3	#4	#5	#6	Result	Notes
1st place, gold medalist(s)	Paolo Dal Soglio	Italy							20.22	
2nd place, silver medalist(s)	Alessandro Andrei	Italy							19.37	
3rd place, bronze medalist(s)	Dimitrios Koutsoukis	Greece							18.83	
4	Luc Viudès	France							18.65	
5	Manuel Martínez	Spain	17.39	x	18.59	17.98	18.19	17.96	18.59	
6	Jean-Louis Lebon	France							17.94	
7	Ilias Louka	Cyprus							17.73	
8	Mikhalis Louka	Cyprus							17.35	
9	José Luis Martínez	Spain	17.16	17.05	17.17				17.17	

=== Discus throw ===
Rank	Name	Nationality	Result	Notes
1st place, gold medalist(s)	Luciano Zerbini	Italy	60.90	
2nd place, silver medalist(s)	Jean Pons	France	57.58	
3rd place, bronze medalist(s)	Jean-Claude Retel	France	57.22	
4	Marco Martino	Italy	55.82	
5	Christos Papadopoulos	Greece	54.56	
6	Huseyin Yilmaz	Turkey	53.14	
7	Mikhalis Louka	Cyprus	43.60	

=== Javelin throw ===
19 June

Rank	Name	Nationality	#1	#2	#3	#4	#5	#6	Result	Notes
1st place, gold medalist(s)	Ivan Mustapić	Croatia							79.46	GR
2nd place, silver medalist(s)	Fabio De Gaspari	Italy							77.18	
3rd place, bronze medalist(s)	Kostas Gatsioudis	Greece							77.00	
4	Alain Storaci	France							75.92	
5	Pascal Lefèvre	France							73.98	
6	Fikret Özsoy	Turkey							70.10	
7	Tihomir Mustapić	Croatia							69.02	
8	Milan Stijepović	Slovenia							68.86	
9	Julián Sotelo	Spain	65.06	x	x				65.06	

== Women's results ==
=== 100 meters ===
17 June
Wind: +0.8 m/s

Rank	Name	Nationality	Time	Notes
1st place, gold medalist(s)	Magalie Simioneck	France	11.39	
2nd place, silver medalist(s)	Odiah Sidibé	France	11.49	
3rd place, bronze medalist(s)	Ekaterini Koffa	Greece	11.71	
4	Annarita Balzani	Italy	11.73	
5	Laura Ardissone	Italy	11.81	
6	Patricia Morales	Spain	11.89	
7	Stalo Konstantinou	Cyprus	11.90	
8	Carmen García	Spain	11.94	

=== 200 meters ===
18 June
Wind: -1.3 m/s

Rank	Name	Nationality	Time	Notes
1st place, gold medalist(s)	Maguy Nestoret	France	23.42	
2nd place, silver medalist(s)	Valérie Jean-Charles	France	23.45	
3rd place, bronze medalist(s)	Donatella Dal Bianco	Italy	24.12	
4	Ekaterini Koffa	Greece	24.15	
5	Stalo Konstantinou	Cyprus	24.47	
6	Elisabetta Birolini	Italy	24.70	
7	Mireia Ruiz	Spain	24.80	

=== 400 meters ===
18 June

Rank	Name	Nationality	Time	Notes
1st place, gold medalist(s)	Elsa Devassoigne	France	52.44	
2nd place, silver medalist(s)	Francine Landre	France	52.95	
3rd place, bronze medalist(s)	Francesca Carbone	Italy	53.78	
4	Yolanda Reyes	Spain	54.11	
5	Giuseppina Perlino	Spain	54.30	
6	Marina Vasarmidou	Greece	54.71	
7	Dora Kyriakou	Cyprus	55.36	

=== 800 meters ===
18 June

Rank	Name	Nationality	Time	Notes
1st place, gold medalist(s)	Hassiba Boulmerka	Algeria	2:03.86	
2nd place, silver medalist(s)	Fabia Trabaldo	Italy	2:04.05	
3rd place, bronze medalist(s)	Amaia Andrés	Spain	2:05.16	
4	Patricia Djaté	France	2:05.61	
5	Nicoletta Tozzi	Italy	2:06.01	
6	Dolores Rodríguez	Spain	2:07.36	
7	Catherine Bailleul	France	2:07.37	
8	Najat Ouali	Morocco	2:14.97	

=== 1500 meters ===
Rank	Name	Nationality	Time	Notes
1st place, gold medalist(s)	Frédérique Quentin	France	4:11.09	
2nd place, silver medalist(s)	Hassiba Boulmerka	Algeria	4:11.09	
3rd place, bronze medalist(s)	Farida Fatès	France	4:12.60	
4	Najat Ouali	Morocco	4:14.95	
5	Elisa Rea	Italy	4:15.65	
6	Zahra Ouaziz	Morocco	4:17.27	
7	Serap Aktaş	Turkey	4:23.72	

=== 3000 meters ===
17 June

Rank	Name	Nationality	Time	Notes
1st place, gold medalist(s)	Valentina Tauceri	Italy	9:00.10	
2nd place, silver medalist(s)	Annette Palluy	France	9:02.96	
3rd place, bronze medalist(s)	Julia Vaquero	Spain	9:04.99	
4	Laurence Vivier	France	9:05.31	
5	Estela Estévez	Spain	9:06.06	
6	Silvia Botticelli	Italy	9:06.18	
7	Zahra Ouaziz	Morocco	9:08.55	
8	Serap Aktaş	Turkey	9:20.67	

=== Marathon ===
20 June

Rank	Name	Nationality	Time	Notes
1st place, gold medalist(s)	Helena Javornik	Slovenia	2:42:58	GR
2nd place, silver medalist(s)	Marie-Hélène Ohier	France	2:43:26	
3rd place, bronze medalist(s)	Sylvianne Geffray	France	2:43:40	
4	Paola Lanzarini	Italy	2:49.26	
	Isabelle Guillot	France	DNF	

=== 100 meters hurdles ===
Heats – 18 June
Wind: Heat 1: -1.5 m/s, Heat 2: -1.8 m/s

Rank	Heat	Name	Nationality	Time	Notes
3	1	María José Mardomingo	Spain	13.67	Q
2	2	Carla Tuzzi	Italy	13.67	Q
3	2	Ana Barrenechea	Spain	13.91	Q

Final – 19 June
Wind: -0.8 m/s

Rank	Name	Nationality	Time	Notes
1st place, gold medalist(s)	Brigita Bukovec	Slovenia	13.10	
2nd place, silver medalist(s)	Cécile Cinélu	France	13.17	
3rd place, bronze medalist(s)	Patricia Girard	France	13.19	
4	Carla Tuzzi	Italy	13.51	
5	María José Mardomingo	Spain	13.52	
6	Ana Barrenechea	Spain	13.92	
7	Margita Papić	Croatia	14.06	
8	Christiana Tambaki	Greece	14.35	

=== 400 meters hurdles ===
19 June

Rank	Name	Nationality	Time	Notes
1st place, gold medalist(s)	Nouzha Bidouane	Morocco	56.09	
2nd place, silver medalist(s)	Nadia Zatouani	Morocco	57.04	
3rd place, bronze medalist(s)	Carole Nelson	France	57.45	
4	Miriam Alonso	Spain	58.06	
5	Irena Dominc	Slovenia	58.29	
6	Corinne Pierre-Joseph	France	58.93	
7	Androula Sialou	Cyprus	1:01.21	

=== 4 × 100 meters relay ===
20 June

Rank	Nation	Competitors	Time	Notes
1st place, gold medalist(s)	France	Patricia Girard, Odiah Sidibé, Maguy Nestoret, Valérie Jean-Charles	43.55	
2nd place, silver medalist(s)	Italy	Elisabetta Birolini, Giuseppina Perlino, Annarita Balzani, Laura Ardissone	45.62	
3rd place, bronze medalist(s)	Spain	Ana Barrenechea, Carmen García, Patricia Morales, Mireia Ruiz	45.93	
4	Cyprus	Stalo Konstantinou, Dora Kyriakou, Olympia Menelaou, Androula Sialou	48.27	

=== High jump ===
17 June

Rank	Name	Nationality	1.65	1.75	1.80	1.84	1.87	1.92	Result	Notes
1st place, gold medalist(s)	Britta Bilač	Slovenia							1.92	
2nd place, silver medalist(s)	Nathalie Lefèbvre	France							1.87	
3rd place, bronze medalist(s)	María del Mar Martínez	Spain	o	o	o	o	xxx		1.84	
4	Niki Bakoyianni	Greece							1.84	
5	Sandrine Fricot	France							1.80	
6	Agni Haralambous	Cyprus							1.75	
7	Marija Jerković	Croatia							1.75	

=== Long jump ===
Rank	Name	Nationality	#1	#2	#3	#4	#5	#6	Result	Notes
1st place, gold medalist(s)	Corinne Hérigault	France							6.54 (w)	
2nd place, silver medalist(s)	Ksenija Predikaka	Slovenia							6.51 (w)	
3rd place, bronze medalist(s)	Silvija Babić	Croatia							6.45 (w)	
4	Fatma Yüksel	Turkey							6.34	
5	Eleni Karambesini	Greece							6.24	
6	Elisa Andretti	Italy							6.20	
7	Nadine Caster	France							6.15	
8	Ghada Shouaa	Syria							6.13	
9	Luisa López	Spain	6.02w	5.86w	5.98				6.02w	

=== Shot put ===
Rank	Name	Nationality	#1	#2	#3	#4	#5	#6	Result	Notes
1st place, gold medalist(s)	Agnese Maffeis	Italy							17.04	
2nd place, silver medalist(s)	Nataša Erjavec	Slovenia							16.88	
3rd place, bronze medalist(s)	Margarita Ramos	Spain	x	16.80	16.86	x	x	16.46	16.86	
4	Mara Rosolen	Italy							15.94	
5	Sevgi Sen	Turkey							15.64	
6	Fouzia Fatihi	Morocco							15.49	
7	Fabienne Locuty	France							15.28	
7	Fotini Kyriakidou	Greece							14.82	

=== Discus throw ===
Rank	Name	Nationality	#1	#2	#3	#4	#5	#6	Result	Notes
1st place, gold medalist(s)	Agnese Maffeis	Italy							57.16	
2nd place, silver medalist(s)	Ekaterini Vongoli	Greece							56.10	
3rd place, bronze medalist(s)	Monia Kari	Tunisia							55.38	
4	Agnès Teppe	France							54.48	
5	Zoubida Laayouni	Morocco							52.92	
6	Sonia Godall	Spain	48.34	51.38	x	52.72	x	50.54	52.72	
7	Ángeles Barreiro	Spain	49.68	52.36	50.92	x	52.50	50.54	52.50	
8	Mara Rosolen	Italy							51.02	
9	Isabelle Devaluez	France							50.14	

=== Javelin throw ===
Rank	Name	Nationality	#1	#2	#3	#4	#5	#6	Result	Notes
1st place, gold medalist(s)	Nathalie Teppe	France							60.90	
2nd place, silver medalist(s)	Nadine Auzeil	France							59.68	
3rd place, bronze medalist(s)	Renata Strašek	Slovenia							59.04	
4	Mirela Manjani	Albania							53.38	
5	Aysel Taş	Turkey							52.56	
6	Belén Palacios	Spain	50.00	49.76	46.56	50.28	52.10	50.74	52.10	
7	Veronica Becuzzi	Italy							50.90	
8	Efthimia Karatopouzi	Greece							50.28	

=== Heptathlon ===
18–19 June

Rank	Athlete	Nationality	100m H	HJ	SP	200m	LJ	JT	800m	Points	Notes
1st place, gold medalist(s)	Nathalie Teppe	France	14.05	1.85	12.53	25.84	5.95	58.52	2:16.12	6256	GR
2nd place, silver medalist(s)	Ghada Shouaa	Syria								6168	
3rd place, bronze medalist(s)	Odile Lesage	France	14.13	1.85	12.58	26.45	6.15	40.50	2:17.51	5888	
4	Patricia Guevara	Spain	14.97	1.61	11.28	26.02	5.96w	35.68	2:24.52	5187	
5	Billur Dulkadir	Turkey	15.18	1.64	11.75	27.16	5.49	48.02	2:28.14	5180	
	Susana Cruz	Spain	14.61	1.73	11.68	26.50	NM	35.36	DNS	DNF	
	Giuliana Spada	Italy				DNS				DNF	
