= Italy at the 1991 Mediterranean Games =

- IOC code: ITA
- NOC: Italian National Olympic Committee

in Athens
- Competitors: 403 in 23 sports
- Medals Ranked 1st: Gold 67 Silver 49 Bronze 52 Total 168

Mediterranean Games appearances (overview)
- 1951; 1955; 1959; 1963; 1967; 1971; 1975; 1979; 1983; 1987; 1991; 1993; 1997; 2001; 2005; 2009; 2013; 2018; 2022; 2026

Italy competed at the 1991 Mediterranean Games in Athens, Greece.

== Medals ==
=== Athletics ===
Sport	Gold	Silver	Bronze	Total
Athletics	11	17	9	37
Totals (1 entries)	11	17	9	37

==== Men ====
Event	1st place, gold medalist(s)	2nd place, silver medalist(s)	3rd place, bronze medalist(s)
100 metres	Ezio Madonia		
200 metres	Stefano Tilli		Sandro Floris
400 metres		Fabio Grossi	
800 metres			Tonino Viali
1500 metres	Gennaro Di Napoli		
10,000 metres		Francesco Bennici	
Marathon		Gianluigi Curreli	
110 metres hurdles			Fausto Frigerio
400 metres hurdles		Fabrizio Mori	Mauro Maurizi
3000 metres steeplechase		Alessandro Lambruschini	
High jump		Luca Toso	Fabrizio Borellini
Pole vault			Marco Andreini
Long jump		Fausto Frigerio	
Shot put	Alessandro Andrei	Luciano Zerbini	
Discus throw	Luciano Zerbini	Marco Martino	
Hammer throw		Enrico Sgrulletti	
Javelin throw		Fabio De Gaspari	
20 km walk	Maurizio Damilano		
4×100 metres relay	Mario Longo; Sandro Floris; Ezio Madonia; Carlo Simionato		
4×400 metres relay	Marco Vaccari; Alessandro Aimar; Fabio Grossi; Andrea Nuti		
	8	11	6

==== Women ====
Event	1st place, gold medalist(s)	2nd place, silver medalist(s)	3rd place, bronze medalist(s)
200 metres	Marisa Masullo		
800 metres			Nadia Falvo
1500 metres			Gabriella Dorio
3000 metres	Roberta Brunet	Nadia Dandolo	
400 metres hurdles		Irmgard Trojer	
Long jump		Valentina Uccheddu	
Shot put		Agnese Maffeis	Mara Rosolen
Discus throw	Agnese Maffeis		
4×100 metres relay		Marisa Masullo; Donatella Dal Bianco; Daniela Ferrian; Rossella Tarolo	
4×400 metres relay		Cosetta Campana; Barbara Martinelli; Roberta Rabaioli; Johanna Zuddas	
	3	6	3

== See also ==
- Swimming at the 1991 Mediterranean Games
- Volleyball at the 1991 Mediterranean Games
- Water polo at the 1991 Mediterranean Games
