= 1991 Italian Athletics Championships =

Edition of the Italian Athletics Championships

- Dates: 11–12 June
- Host city: Turin (main events)
- Venue: Stadio Comunale
- Level: Senior
- Events: 47 (26 men, 21 women)

The 1991 Italian Athletics Championships was the 81st edition of the Italian Athletics Championships and were held in Turin.

== Champions ==
The table also includes the national champions of non-track and field events whose competitions were not held in Turin.

Non-track and field events

Full results.

=== Men ===
Event	Athlete	Performance
100 metres	Ezio Madonia	10.30
200 metres	Stefano Tilli	20.65
400 metres	Andrea Nuti	45.98
800 metres	Tonino Viali	1:47.61
1500 metres	Gennaro Di Napoli	3:40.85
5000 metres	Stefano Mei	13:43.98
10,000 metres	Vincenzo Modica	28:51.21
110 metres hurdles	Laurent Ottoz	13.56
400 metres hurdles	Fabrizio Mori	50.12
3000 metres steeplechase	Angelo Carosi	8:39.15
High jump	Fabrizio Borellini	2.25
Pole vault	Gianni Iapichino	5.50
Long jump	Fausto Frigerio	7.95
Triple jump	Dario Badinelli	16.45
Shot put	Alessandro Andrei	19.32
Discus throw	Marco Martino	61.96
Hammer throw	Lucio Serrani	71.88
Javelin throw	Fabio De Gaspari	75.00
Decathlon (Note: Held in Brunico 27-28 July)	Marco Baffi	7565
Half Marathon	Raffaello Alliegro	01:04:39
Marathon	Salvatore Bettiol	02:11:48
10,000 metres track walk	Giovanni De Benedictis	40:17.54
20 km road walk	Giovanni De Benedictis	01:23:42
50 km road walk	Giovanni Pericelli	03:39:40
Cross country (long course)	Francesco Panetta	
Mountain running	Costantino Bertolla	

=== Women ===
Event	Athlete	Performance
100 metres	Marisa Masullo	11.50
200 metres	Rossella Tarolo	23.47
400 metres	Roberta Rabaioli	54.07
800 metres	Fabia Trabaldo	2:04.98
1500 metres	Fabia Trabaldo	4:17.73
3000 metres	Nadia Dandolo	8:48.21
10,000 metres	Maria Guida	34:04.22
100 metres hurdles	Daniela Morandini	13.75
400 metres hurdles	Irmgard Trojer	55.62
High jump	Barbara Fiammengo	1.88
Long jump	Valentina Uccheddu	6.53
Triple jump	Antonella Capriotti	13.28
Shot put	Agnese Maffeis	17.26
Discus throw	Agnese Maffeis	58.36
Javelin throw	Veronica Becuzzi	54.04*
Heptathlon	Claudia Del Fabbro	5685
Half Marathon	Anna Villani	01:13:35
Marathon	Emma Scaunich	02:30:26
5000 Metres Track Walk	Ileana Salvador	21:16:33
20 Kilometres Road Walk	-	-
Cross country (long course)	Nadia Dandolo	
Mountain running	Manuela Di Centa	
10 Kilometres Road Walk	Annarita Sidoti	43:37:00
