= 1992 Italian Athletics Championships =

Edition of the Italian Athletics Championships

- Dates: 23–24 June
- Host city: Bologna (main events)
- Venue: Stadio Dallara
- Level: Senior
- Events: 47 (26 men, 21 women)

The 1992 Italian Athletics Championships was the 82nd edition of the Italian Athletics Championships and were held in Bologna.

== Champions ==
The table also includes the national champions of non-track and field events whose competitions were not held in Bologna.

Non-track and field events

Full results.

=== Men ===
Event	Athlete	Performance
100 metres	Stefano Tilli	10.40
200 metres	Giorgio Marras	21.05
400 metres	Marco Vaccari	45.47
800 metres	Andrea Benvenuti	1:46.60
1500 metres	Gennaro Di Napoli	3:40.17
5000 metres	Renato Gotti	13:39.08
10,000 metres	Paolo Donati	28:46.40
110 metres hurdles	Laurent Ottoz	13.51
400 metres hurdles	Enzo Franciosi	50.55
3000 metres steeplechase	Alessandro Lambruschini	8:28.20
High jump	Roberto Ferrari	2.22
Pole vault	Gianni Iapichino	5.40
Long jump	Giovanni Evangelisti	8.04w
Triple jump	Dario Badinelli	16.60w
Shot put	Alessandro Andrei	19.63
Discus throw	Luciano Zerbini	60.88
Hammer throw	Enrico Sgrulletti	76.26
Javelin throw	Fabio De Gaspari	77.52
Decathlon	Marco Baffi	7495
Half Marathon	Vincenzo Modica	01:03:06
Marathon	Giacomo Tagliaferri	02:16:27
10,000 metres track walk	Pietro Fiorini	40:12.41
20 km road walk	Maurizio Damilano	1:22:46.67t
50 km road walk	Giovanni Pericelli	03:55:01
Cross country (long course)	Francesco Panetta	
Mountain running	Davide Milesi	

=== Women ===
Event	Athlete	Performance
100 metres	Marisa Masullo	11.59
200 metres	Marisa Masullo	23.54
400 metres	Cosetta Campana	54.04
800 metres	Nadia Falvo	2:08.03
1500 metres	Fabia Trabaldo	4:14.30
3000 metres	Roberta Brunet	9:00.21
10,000 metres	Orietta Mancia	33:34.84
100 metres hurdles	Daniela Morandini	13.72
400 metres hurdles	Irmgard Trojer	56.09
High jump	Antonella Bevilacqua	1.88
Long jump	Valentina Uccheddu	6.54
Triple jump	Antonella Capriotti	13.66
Shot put	Agnese Maffeis	17.34
Discus throw	Agnese Maffeis	57.62
Javelin throw	Gloria Crippa	53.30*
Heptathlon	Giuliana Spada	5991
Half Marathon	Anna Villani	01:12:01
Marathon	Emma Scaunich	02:35:06
5000 Metres Track Walk	Ileana Salvador	20:42.31
20 Kilometres Road Walk	Annarita Sidoti	01:36:54
Cross country (long course)	Nadia Dandolo	
Mountain running	Antonella Molinari	
10 Kilometres Road Walk	Ileana Salvador	43:31:00
