= 1989 Italian Athletics Championships =

Edition of the Italian Athletics Championships

- Dates: 25–26 July
- Host city: Cesenatico (main events)
- Venue: Stadio Alfiero Moretti
- Level: Senior
- Events: 47 (26 men, 21 women)

The 1989 Italian Athletics Championships was the 79th edition of the Italian Athletics Championships and were held in Cesenatico.

== Champions ==
The table also includes the national champions of non-track and field events whose competitions were not held in Cesenatico.

Non-track and field events

Full results.

=== Men ===
Event	Athlete	Performance
100 metres	Stefano Tilli	10.34
200 metres	Sandro Floris	21.24
400 metres	Andrea Montanari	46.19
800 metres	Tonino Viali	1:46.99
1500 metres	Davide Tirelli	3:49.23
5000 metres	Stefano Mei	13:54.55
10,000 metres	Massimo Santamaria	29:16.99
110 metres hurdles	Fausto Frigerio	14.08
400 metres hurdles	Fabrizio Mori	50.67
3000 metres steeplechase	Angelo Carosi	8:33.33
High jump	Marcello Benvenuti	2.24
Pole vault	Marco Andreini	5.50
Long jump	Milko Campus	7.73
Triple jump	Dario Badinelli	16.88w
Shot put	Alessandro Andrei	19.54
Discus throw	Luciano Zerbini	62.14
Hammer throw	Enrico Sgrulletti	73.08
Javelin throw	Fabio De Gaspari	79.30
Decathlon (Note: Held in Bolzano 23-24 September)	Fabio Pacori	7089
Half Marathon	Walter Durbano	01:03:27
Marathon	Marco Milani	02:16:08
10,000 metres track walk	Giovanni De Benedictis	39:39.40
20 km road walk	Giovanni De Benedictis	01:22:01
50 km road walk	Giovanni Pericelli	03:58:10
Cross country (long course)	Francesco Panetta	
Mountain running	Fausto Bonzi	

=== Women ===
Event	Athlete	Performance
100 metres	Sonia Vigati	11.52
200 metres	Rossella Tarolo	23.61
400 metres	Rossana Morabito	53.94
800 metres	Nicoletta Tozzi	2:06.00
1500 metres	Roberta Brunet	4:26.24
3000 metres	Roberta Brunet	9:04.05
10,000 metres	Maria Curatolo	33:21.09
100 metres hurdles	Carla Tuzzi	13.62
400 metres hurdles	Irmgard Trojer	56.96
High jump	Roberta Bugarini	1.84
Long jump	Antonella Capriotti	6.43
Shot put	Agnese Maffeis	16.32
Discus throw	Agnese Maffeis	55.28
Javelin throw	Veronica Becuzzi	53.46*
Heptathlon	Herta Steiner	5569
Half Marathon	Allison Rabour	01:12:56
Marathon	Emma Scaunich	02:36:02
5000 Metres Track Walk	Ileana Salvador	20:57.85
20 Kilometres Road Walk	-	-
Cross country (long course)	Nives Curti	
Mountain running	Manuela Di Centa	
10 Kilometres Road Walk	Ileana Salvador	44:57:00
