= Italy at the 1993 Mediterranean Games =

- IOC code: ITA
- NOC: Italian National Olympic Committee

in Languedoc-Roussillon
- Competitors: 345 in 25 sports
- Medals Ranked 2nd: Gold 37 Silver 44 Bronze 40 Total 121

Mediterranean Games appearances (overview)
- 1951; 1955; 1959; 1963; 1967; 1971; 1975; 1979; 1983; 1987; 1991; 1993; 1997; 2001; 2005; 2009; 2013; 2018; 2022; 2026

Italy competed at the 1993 Mediterranean Games in Languedoc-Roussillon, France.

== Medals ==
=== Athletics ===
Sport	Gold	Silver	Bronze	Total
Athletics	6	5	5	16
Totals (1 entries)	6	5	5	16

==== Men ====
Event	1st place, gold medalist(s)	2nd place, silver medalist(s)	3rd place, bronze medalist(s)
10,000 metres			Vincenzo Modica
400 metres hurdles		Giorgio Frinolli	
Marathon	Davide Milesi		Marco Toini
Shot put	Paolo Dal Soglio	Alessandro Andrei	
Discus throw	Luciano Zerbini		
Javelin throw		Fabio De Gaspari	
4×400 metres relay			Maurizio Federici; Vito Petrella; Gianrico Boncompagni; Alessandro Aimar
	3	3	3

==== Women ====
Event	1st place, gold medalist(s)	2nd place, silver medalist(s)	3rd place, bronze medalist(s)
200 metres			Donatella Dal Bianco
400 metres			Francesca Carbone
800 metres		Fabia Trabaldo	
3000 metres	Valentina Tauceri		
Shot put	Agnese Maffeis		
Discus throw	Agnese Maffeis		
4×100 metres relay		Elisabetta Birolini; Giuseppina Perlino; Annarita Balzani; Laura Ardissone	
	3	2	2

== See also ==
- Judo at the 1993 Mediterranean Games
- Volleyball at the 1993 Mediterranean Games
- Water polo at the 1993 Mediterranean Games
