= 1990 Italian Athletics Championships =

Edition of the Italian Athletics Championships

- Dates: 12–13 September
- Host city: Pescara (main events)
- Venue: Stadio Adriatico
- Level: Senior
- Events: 47 (26 men, 21 women)

The 1990 Italian Athletics Championships was the 80th edition of the Italian Athletics Championships and were held in Pescara.

== Champions ==
The table also includes the national champions of non-track and field events whose competitions were not held in Pescara.

Non-track and field events

Full results.

=== Men ===
Event	Athlete	Performance
100 metres	Stefano Tilli	10.56
200 metres	Giovanni Puggioni	20.82
400 metres	Andrea Nuti	46.55
800 metres	Tonino Viali	1:47.72
1500 metres	Gennaro Di Napoli	3:43.32
5000 metres	Renato Gotti	13:57.14
10,000 metres	Graziano Calvaresi	28:54.96
110 metres hurdles	Laurent Ottoz	14.12
400 metres hurdles	Mauro Maurizi	50.66
3000 metres steeplechase	Alessandro Lambruschini	8:22.32
High jump	Daniele Pagani	2.19
Pole vault	Gianni Iapichino	5.40
Long jump	Giuseppe Bertozzi	7.92
Triple jump	Dario Badinelli	16.72w
Shot put	Alessandro Andrei	18.75
Discus throw	Marco Martino	60.40
Hammer throw	Enrico Sgrulletti	77.14
Javelin throw	Fabio De Gaspari	75.42
Decathlon (Note: Held in Milan 22-23 September)	Luciano Asta	7126
Half Marathon	Gelindo Bordin	01:03:39
Marathon	Severino Bernardini	02:11:53
10,000 metres track walk	Giovanni De Benedictis	39:10.35
20 km road walk	Giovanni De Benedictis	01:22:59
50 km road walk	Maurizio Damilano	03:46:51
Cross country (long course)	Francesco Panetta	
Mountain running	Severino Bernardini	

=== Women ===
Event	Athlete	Performance
100 metres	Marisa Masullo	11.82
200 metres	Marisa Masullo	23.32
400 metres	Irmgard Trojer	53.47
800 metres	Nicoletta Tozzi	2:06.96
1500 metres	Roberta Brunet	4:17.60
3000 metres	Roberta Brunet	8:48.74
10,000 metres	Orietta Mancia	33:28.44
100 metres hurdles	Carla Tuzzi	14.02
400 metres hurdles	Irmgard Trojer	56.93
High jump	Barbara Fiammengo	1.86
Long jump	Antonella Capriotti	6.44
Triple jump	Anna Maria Bonazza	12.64
Shot put	Agnese Maffeis	16.77
Discus throw	Agnese Maffeis	58.54
Javelin throw	Fausta Quintavalla	56.26*
Heptathlon	Ifeoma Ozoeze	5696
Half Marathon	Silvana Cuchietti	01:18:02
Marathon	Emma Scaunich	02:32:46
5000 Metres Track Walk	Ileana Salvador	20:50.63
20 Kilometres Road Walk	-	-
Cross country (long course)	Nadia Dandolo	
Mountain running	Maria Cocchetti	
10 Kilometres Road Walk	Ileana Salvador	45:04:00
