= 1991 IAAF World Indoor Championships – Men's 200 metres =

The men's 200 metres event at the 1991 IAAF World Indoor Championships was held on 9 and 10 March.

== Medalists ==
Gold	Silver	Bronze
Nikolay Antonov; Bulgaria	Linford Christie; Great Britain	Ade Mafe; United Kingdom

== Results ==
=== Heats ===
First 2 of each heat (Q) and next 6 fastest (q) qualified for the semifinals.

Rank	Heat	Name	Nationality	Time	Notes
1	1	Nikolay Antonov	Bulgaria	20.99	Q
2	5	Thomas Jefferson	United States	21.13	Q
3	1	Patrick Stevens	Belgium	21.15	Q, PB
4	2	Andrey Fedoriv	Soviet Union	21.20	Q
4	6	Miguel Ángel Gómez	Spain	21.20	Q
6	2	Ade Mafe	Great Britain	21.27	Q
7	5	Paolo Catalano	Italy	21.32	Q
8	4	Linford Christie	Great Britain	21.35	Q
9	1	Daron Council	United States	21.37	q
9	2	Jeroen Fischer	Belgium	21.37	q
11	4	Daniel Cojocaru	Romania	21.42	Q
12	5	Luis Rodríguez	Spain	21.43	q
13	6	Éric Perrot	France	21.48	Q
14	2	Troy Douglas	Bermuda	21.54	q, NR
15	4	Jiří Valík	Czechoslovakia	21.69	q
16	3	Sandro Floris	Italy	21.74	Q
17	4	Dazel Jules	Trinidad and Tobago	21.75	q
18	6	Abdullahi Tetengi	Nigeria	21.76	
19	3	Franz Ratzenberger	Austria	21.84	Q
20	4	Benyounés Lahlou	Morocco	22.08	
21	1	Christian Boda	Mauritius	22.14	NR
22	6	Christopher Nibilo	Tanzania	22.35	NR
23	3	Trevor Davis	Anguilla	22.44	
24	4	Joseph Gikonyo	Kenya	22.58	
25	3	Clinton Bufuku	Zambia	22.66	NR
26	2	Dudley den Dulk	Netherlands Antilles	22.99	NR
27	5	Carlos García	Dominican Republic	23.63	
	6	Rodney Cox	Turks and Caicos Islands	DQ	
	6	Neil de Silva	Trinidad and Tobago	DQ	
	1	Abdelali Kasbane	Morocco	DNS	
	2	Eric Akogyiram	Ghana	DNS	
	3	Emmanuel Tuffour	Ghana	DNS	
	5	Anninos Marcoullides	Cyprus	DNS	
	5	Andreas Berger	Austria	DNS	

=== Semifinals ===
First 2 of each semifinal (Q) qualified directly for the final.

Rank	Heat	Name	Nationality	Time	Notes
1	1	Nikolay Antonov	Bulgaria	20.83	Q
2	1	Ade Mafe	Great Britain	20.95	Q
3	3	Miguel Ángel Gómez	Spain	21.09	Q, PB
4	2	Linford Christie	Great Britain	21.12	Q
5	1	Sandro Floris	Italy	21.17	
6	2	Thomas Jefferson	United States	21.19	Q
6	3	Andrey Fedoriv	Soviet Union	21.19	Q
8	2	Patrick Stevens	Belgium	21.33	
9	3	Paolo Catalano	Italy	21.36	
10	3	Daniel Cojocaru	Romania	21.41	
11	2	Éric Perrot	France	21.43	
12	1	Franz Ratzenberger	Austria	21.65	
13	2	Luis Rodríguez	Spain	21.67	
14	3	Jeroen Fischer	Belgium	21.73	
15	1	Daron Council	United States	21.74	
16	3	Troy Douglas	Bermuda	21.78	
17	1	Dazel Jules	Trinidad and Tobago	21.91	
18	2	Jiří Valík	Czechoslovakia	22.41	

=== Final ===
Rank	Lane	Name	Nationality	Time	Notes
1st place, gold medalist(s)	4	Nikolay Antonov	Bulgaria	20.67	F1
2nd place, silver medalist(s)	5	Linford Christie	Great Britain	20.72	
3rd place, bronze medalist(s)	3	Ade Mafe	Great Britain	20.92	
4	2	Thomas Jefferson	United States	21.11	
5	6	Miguel Ángel Gómez	Spain	21.29	
6	1	Andrey Fedoriv	Soviet Union	21.65	F1
