= Baffi =

Baffi is an Italian surname. Notable people with the surname include:

- Adriano Baffi (born 1962), Italian cyclist
- Marco Baffi (1964), Italian decathlete
- Paolo Baffi (1911–1989), Italian academic, banker and economist
- Pierino Baffi (1930–1985), Italian cyclist
