= Salah Qoqaiche =

Moroccan long-distance runner

Salah Qoqaiche (born 10 July 1967) is a retired Moroccan long-distance runner who specialized in the marathon race.

He won the gold medal at the 1991 Mediterranean Games and finished fifth in the marathon at the 1992 Summer Olympics. He also entered the 1997 World Championships, but did not finish.

== Achievements ==
Year	Competition	Venue	Position	Event	Notes
Representing Morocco
1991	Mediterranean Games	Athens, Greece	1st	Marathon	2:20:26
1992	Olympic Games	Barcelona, Spain	6th	Marathon	2:14:25
1997	World Championships	Athens, Greece	—	Marathon	DNF
