= Réda Abdenouz =

Algerian middle-distance runner (born 1968)

Personal information
- Born: 25 September 1968 (age 57) Hussein Dey, Algiers Province

Sport
- Sport: Track and field
Medal record
Representing Algeria
Mediterranean Games
Gold medal – first place	1991 Athens	800 m
Bronze medal – third place	1993 Narbonne	800 m

Réda Abdenouz (Arabic: رضا عبد النوز; born 25 September 1968) is a retired Algerian middle-distance runner who specialized in the 800 metres. He was a finalist at the 1992 Summer Olympics, twice a medallist at the Mediterranean Games and represented his country at two editions of the World Athletics Championships.

== International competitions ==
Year	Competition	Venue	Position	Event	Notes
Representing Algeria
1990	IAAF Grand Prix Final	Athens, Greece	2nd	800 m	
1991	Mediterranean Games	Athens, Greece	1st	800 m	
1992	Olympic Games	Barcelona, Spain	7th	800 m	
1993	Mediterranean Games	Narbonne, France	3rd	800 m	

== Personal bests ==
- 800 metres - 1:44.98 min (1993)
- 1500 metres - 3:38.94 min (1993)
