= 1990 IAAF Grand Prix Final =

- Host city: Athens, Greece
- Events: 18
- Dates: 7 September
- Main venue: Olympic Stadium

The 1990 IAAF Grand Prix Final was the sixth edition of the season-ending competition for the IAAF Grand Prix track and field circuit, organised by the International Association of Athletics Federations. It was held on 7 September at the Olympic Stadium (Athens) in Athens, Greece. Leroy Burrell (100 metres) and Merlene Ottey (200 metres) were the overall points winners of the tournament. This was Ottey's second series win (having previously won in 1987) and made her the second woman to win the honour twice, after Paula Ivan. The number of athletics events in the programme reached eighteen for the first time, with ten for men and eight for women.

== Medal summary ==
=== Men ===
Event	Gold		Silver		Bronze	
100 metres	Leroy Burrell (USA)	10.04	Mark Witherspoon (USA)	10.11	Carl Lewis (USA)	10.12
800 metres	William Tanui (KEN)	1:44.95	Réda Abdenouz (ALG)	1:45.17	Nixon Kiprotich (KEN)	1:45.17
One mile	Noureddine Morceli (ALG)	3:53.28	Jens-Peter Herold (GDR)	3:53.77	Peter Elliott (GBR)	3:53.85
5000 metres	Brahim Boutayeb (MAR)	13:30.54	Khalid Skah (MAR)	13:31.22	Yobes Ondieki (KEN)	13:31.37
3000 metres steeplechase	Julius Kariuki (KEN)	8:24.08	Patrick Sang (KEN)	8:24.77	Julius Korir (KEN)	8:25.19
400 m hurdles	Samuel Matete (ZAM)	47.91	Danny Harris (USA)	47.93	Winthrop Graham (JAM)	48.88
High jump	Sergey Malchenko (URS)	2.34 m	Georgi Dakov (BUL)	2.32 m	Javier Sotomayor (CUB)	2.32 m
Triple jump	Leonid Voloshin (URS)	17.35 m	Marios Hadjiandreou (CYP)	16.91 m	Mike Conley, Sr. (USA)	16.82 m
Shot put	Ulf Timmermann (GDR)	21.00 m	Georg Andersen (NOR)	20.50 m	Ron Backes (USA)	20.30 m
Hammer throw	Yuriy Sedykh (URS)	80.26 m	Tibor Gécsek (HUN)	77.52 m	Tore Gustafsson (SWE)	74.44 m

=== Women ===
Event	Gold		Silver		Bronze	
200 metres	Merlene Ottey (JAM)	21.88	Grit Breuer (GDR)	22.58	Galina Malchugina (URS)	22.59
400 metres	Ana Fidelia Quirot (CUB)	50.31	Fatima Yusuf (NGR)	50.96	Pauline Davis (BAH)	51.00
1500 metres	Sandra Gasser (SUI)	4:06.11	Yvonne Mai (GDR)	4:07.56	Svetlana Kitova (URS)	4:07.88
5000 metres	PattiSue Plumer (USA)	15:14.36	Nadia Dandolo (ITA)	15:14.93	Viorica Ghican (ROM)	15:15.74
100 m hurdles	Gloria Siebert (GDR)	12.74	Lidiya Yurkova (URS)	12.76	Monique Éwanjé-Épée (FRA)	12.86
Long jump	Heike Drechsler (GDR)	6.98 m	Inessa Kravets (URS)	6.82 m	Marieta Ilcu (ROM)	6.78 m
Discus throw	Ilke Wyludda (GDR)	67.08 m	Martina Hellmann (GDR)	63.54 m	Larisa Mikhalchenko (URS)	63.34 m
Javelin throw	Petra Felke (GDR)	66.44 m	Brigitte Graune (FRG)	61.48 m	Dulce García (CUB)	61.24 m

== Points leaders ==
=== Men ===
Event	Gold		Silver		Bronze	
Overall	Leroy Burrell (USA)	63	Noureddine Morceli (ALG)	61	Danny Harris (USA)	59
100 metres	Leroy Burrell (USA)	63	Mark Witherspoon (USA)	50	Calvin Smith (USA)	46
800 metres	Nixon Kiprotich (KEN)	54	Réda Abdenouz (ALG)	45	William Tanui (KEN)	41
One mile	Noureddine Morceli (ALG)	61	Jens-Peter Herold (GDR)	46	Joe Falcon (USA)	42
5000 metres	Khalid Skah (MAR)	59	Brahim Boutayeb (MAR)	47	Yobes Ondieki (KEN)	46
3000 metres steeplechase	Julius Kariuki (KEN)	56	Patrick Sang (KEN)	49	Julius Korir (KEN)	40
400 m hurdles	Danny Harris (USA)	59	Samuel Matete (ZAM)	56	Winthrop Graham (JAM)	50
High jump	Hollis Conway (USA)	56	Georgi Dakov (BUL)	49	Sergey Malchenko (URS)	48.5
Triple jump	Mike Conley, Sr. (USA)	59	Ján Čado (TCH)	49	Oleg Protsenko (URS)	48
Shot put	Ulf Timmermann (GDR)	54	Georg Andersen (NOR)	50	Ron Backes (USA)	42
Hammer throw	Yuriy Sedykh (URS)	59	Tibor Gécsek (HUN)	49	Heinz Weis (FRG)	48

=== Women ===
Event	Gold		Silver		Bronze	
Overall	Merlene Ottey (JAM)	63	Heike Drechsler (GDR)	63	Petra Felke (GDR)	63
200 metres	Merlene Ottey (JAM)	63	Grace Jackson (JAM)	53	Galina Malchugina (URS)	49
400 metres	Ana Fidelia Quirot (CUB)	59	Pauline Davis (BAH)	50	Fatima Yusuf (NGR)	46
1500 metres	Doina Melinte (ROM)	51	Svetlana Kitova (URS)	46	Margareta Keszeg (ROM)	40
5000 metres	PattiSue Plumer (USA)	63	Viorica Ghican (ROM)	45	Nadia Dandolo (ITA)	37
100 m hurdles	Monique Éwanjé-Épée (FRA)	57	Gloria Siebert (GDR)	52	Lidiya Yurkova (URS)	47
Long jump	Heike Drechsler (GDR)	63	Inessa Kravets (URS)	55	Marieta Ilcu (ROM)	49
Discus throw	Ilke Wyludda (GDR)	63	Martina Hellmann (GDR)	28	Tsvetanka Khristova (BUL)	26
Javelin throw	Petra Felke (GDR)	63	Dulce García (CUB)	34	Karen Forkel (GDR)	32
