= Maguy Nestoret =

French sprinter

Personal information
- Nationality: France
- Born: 28 July 1969 (age 57) Vitry-sur-Seine, France
- Height: 1.66 m (5 ft 5 in)

Sport
- Events: 100 metres, 200 metres
Medal record
Representing France
Mediterranean Games
| Gold medal – first place | 1991 Athens | 4x100m relay |
| Gold medal – first place | 1993 Narbonne | 200m |
| Gold medal – first place | 1993 Narbonne | 4x100m relay |
| Silver medal – second place | 1991 Athens | 100m |

Maguy Nestoret (born 28 July 1969) is a French athlete who specialises in the 200 metres. Nestoret competed in the women's 200 m at the 1992 Summer Olympics where she took fifth in heat three in a time of 24.15 seconds.

She was part of a relay that took fifth in the 4 × 100 metres relay at the 1991 World Championships in Athletics at Tokyo. She also won three Mediterranean Games gold medals in the 200 m in 1993, the 4 × 100 m relay in 1991 and again in 1993. Maguy won the French national 200 m title in 1993.

== National titles ==
- French Athletics Championships
  - 200 m: 1993
- French Indoor Athletics Championships
  - 200 m : 1993

== Personal records ==
| Event | Performance | Location | Date |
|---|---|---|---|
| 100 m | 11.36 s | Stuttgart | 15 August 1993 |
| 200 m | 23.15 s | Gothenburg | 9 August 1995 |
