= Benyounés Lahlou =

Moroccan runner (born 1964)

Personal information
- Born: 3 November 1964 (age 61) Oujda, Morocco

Sport
- Sport: Track and field
Medal record
Representing Morocco
African Championships
| Silver medal – second place | 1990 Cairo | 4×400 m relay |
Summer Universiade
| Silver medal – second place | 1991 Sheffield | 400 m |
Mediterranean Games
| Silver medal – second place | 1993 Languedoc | 400 m |
| Silver medal – second place | 1993 Languedoc | 4x400 m relay |
| Bronze medal – third place | 1991 Athens | 4x400 m relay |

Benyounés Lahlou (born 3 November 1964) is a Moroccan runner who specialized in the 400 and 800 metres.

Lahlou finished seventh in 4 x 400 metres relay at the 1991 World Championships, together with teammates Abdelali Kasbane, Ali Dahane and Bouchaib Belkaid.

On the individual level, Lahlou won a silver medal at the 1991 Summer Universiade and a bronze medal at the 1993 Mediterranean Games, both times in the 400 m. Participating in the 1996 Summer Olympics, he finished eighth in the 800 m final.
