= Aysel Taş =

Olympic javelin thrower

Personal information
- Nationality: Turkey
- Born: Aysel Shevkedova; Айсел Шевкедова; 21 October 1964 (age 61)

Sport
- Sport: Javelin throw

Achievements and titles
- Personal best: 56.86 m NR (2000)
Medal record
Representing Turkey
Mediterranean Games
Bronze medal – third place	1991 Athens	Javelin throw

Aysel Taş (born 21 October 1964), née Aysel Shevkedova (Bulgarian: Айсел Шевкедова), is a female javelin thrower from Bulgaria with Turkish ethnicity, who competed for Turkey after her emigration.

At the 1983 European Athletics Junior Championships held in Schwechat, Austria, she achieved the 5th rank for her native country with 55.30 m (old javelin weight).

She represented Turkey at the 1996 Summer Olympics held in Atlanta, Georgia, USA, without advancing to the finals.

Aysel Taş is the current national record holder with 56.86 m set on 20 May 2000 in İzmir, Turkey.

After retiring from active sports, she coaches her son Şevket Taş (born 28 February 1986), who is also a national javelin thrower and record holder in the U23 category.

== Achievements ==
Year	Competition	Venue	Position	Notes
Representing Bulgaria
1983	7th European Junior Championships	Schwechat, Austria	5th	55.30 m (old)
Representing Turkey
2000	First League Athletics	İzmir, Turkey	1st	56.86 m
