= Stavros Tsitouras =

Greek pole vaulter (born 1969)

Stavros Tsitouras (Greek: Σταύρος Τσίτουρας; born 15 June 1969) is a retired Greek pole vaulter.

He finished fifth at the 1991 Mediterranean Games, won the gold medal at the 1993 Mediterranean Games, the bronze medal at the 1998 Balkan Games and the bronze medal at the 1999 Balkan Indoor Championships. He also competed at the 1993 World Championships and the 1997 World Championships without reaching the final.

He became Greek champion in 1998 and 1999 and Greek indoor champion in 1999.

His personal best jump was 5.61 metres, achieved in June 2000 in Minsk.
