= Zid Abou Hamed =

Australian-Syrian hurdler (born 1970)

Personal information
- Citizenship: Syria; Australia
- Born: 4 April 1970 (age 56) Syria
Medal record
Men's athletics
Representing Syria
Asian Championships
Gold medal – first place	1993 Manila	400 m hurdles
Bronze medal – third place	1991 Kuala Lumpur	400 m hurdles
Mediterranean Games
Gold medal – first place	1993 Narbonne	400 m hurdles
Gold medal – first place	1997 Bari	400 m hurdles
Pan Arab Games
Gold medal – first place	1992 Damascus	400 m hurdles
Bronze medal – third place	1997 Beirut	400m hurdles

Zid Abou Hamed (Arabic: زيد أبو حامد; born 4 April 1970) is an Australian-Syrian former track and field athlete who specialized in the 400 metres hurdles.

== Career ==
Hamed originally began to compete for his birth country Syria. He represented the country at the World Championships in 1991 and 1993.

Hamed then changed his nationality to Australia but was ineligible for the 1996 Summer Olympics but started at the World Championships in the 1997 and 1999 World Championships. In February 1999 in Sydney he achieved a career best time of 48.87 seconds.

When Hamed was not selected for the 2000 Summer Olympics in Sydney, he appealed to the Australian Olympic Committee but lost. As a result, he competed for Syria at the Olympics instead.

== International competitions ==
Year	Competition	Venue	Position	Event	Notes
Representing Syria
1991	Mediterranean Games	Athens, Greece	6th	400 m hrd	51.07
1991	Asian Championships	Kuala Lumpur, Malaysia	3rd	400 m hrd	51.15
1991	World Championships	Tokyo, Japan	33rd (h)	400 m hrd	51.57
1992	Pan Arab Games	Latakia, Syria	1st	400 m hrd	49.39
1993	Mediterranean Games	Narbonne, France	1st	400 m hrd	49.09
1993	World Championships	Stuttgart, Germany	23rd (h)	400 m hrd	49.96
1993	Asian Championships	Manila, Philippines	1st	400 m hrd	49.10
1997	Pan Arab Games	Beirut, Lebanon	3rd	400 m hrd	49.68
1997	Mediterranean Games	Bari, Italy	1st	400 m hrd	49.25
Representing Australia
1997	World Championships	Athens, Greece	16th (sf)	400 m hrd	49.12
1998	Commonwealth Games	Kuala Lumpur, Malaysia	4th	400 m hrd	49.11
1998	World Cup	Johannesburg, South Africa	8th	400 m hrd	50.50
1999	World Championships	Seville, Spain	41st (h)	400 m hrd	50.85
Representing Syria
2000	Olympic Games	Sydney, Australia	33rd (h)	400 m hrd	50.74
