= Luis Turón =

Luis Turón Juvantent (born 15 January 1970) is a retired Spanish athlete who specialised in sprinting events. He represented his country at the 1991 World Indoor Championships in Seville reaching the semifinals.

== Competition record ==
Year	Competition	Venue	Position	Event	Notes
Representing Spain
1989	European Junior Championships	Varaždin, Yugoslavia	13th (h)	200 m	21.75
1990	Ibero-American Championships	Manaus, Brazil	5th	200 m	21.55
1990	Ibero-American Championships	Manaus, Brazil	2nd	4 × 100 m relay	40.49
1991	World Indoor Championships	Seville, Spain	11th (sf)	60 m	6.69
1991	Mediterranean Games	Athens, Greece	2nd	4 × 100 m relay	39.39
1993	Mediterranean Games	Narbonne, France	6th (h)	100 m	10.70
1993	Mediterranean Games	Narbonne, France	3rd	4 × 100 m relay	39.90
1994	European Indoor Championships	Paris, France	15th (h)	60 m	6.79
1994	European Championships	Helsinki, Finland	10th (h)	4 × 100 m relay	40.01
