= Miguel Ángel Gómez =

Spanish sprinter

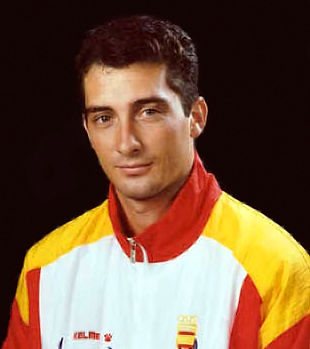

Personal information
- Born: 24 April 1968 Mairena del Alcor, Spain
- Died: 6 April 1993 (aged 24) Aroche, Spain
- Height: 1.86 m (6 ft 1 in)
- Weight: 73 kg (161 lb)

Sport
- Sport: Track and field
- Event: 200 metres

Miguel Ángel Gómez Campuzano (24 April 1968 – 6 April 1993) was a Spanish sprinter who competed primarily in the 200 metres. He represented his country at the 1992 Summer Olympics. In addition he reached the final at the 1991 World Indoor Championships.

He died in a motorcycle accident together with his girlfriend in 1993.

== Competition record ==
Year	Competition	Venue	Position	Event	Notes
Representing Spain
1988	European Indoor Championships	Budapest, Hungary	14th (h)	200 m	21.58
1989	World Cup	Barcelona, Spain	8th	200 m	20.98
1991	World Indoor Championships	Seville, Spain	5th	200 m	21.29
1991	Mediterranean Games	Athens, Greece	2nd	200 m	20.76
1991	Mediterranean Games	Athens, Greece	2nd	4x100 m relay	39.39
1991	World Championships	Tokyo, Japan	36th (h)	200 m	21.08
1991	World Championships	Tokyo, Japan	12th (h)	4×100 m relay	39.52
1992	Ibero-American Championships	Seville, Spain	5th	200 m	21.53
1992	Olympic Games	Barcelona, Spain	34th (qf)	200 m	21.32

== Personal bests ==
Outdoor

- 200 metres – 20.76 (-1.0 m/s, Athens 1991)

Indoor

- 200 metres – 21.09 (Seville 1991)
