= Daron Council =

American sprinter (born 1964)

Personal information
- Born: December 26, 1964
- Education: Auburn University
- Height: 6 ft 1 in (185 cm)
- Weight: 170 lb (77 kg)

Sport
- Sport: Track and field
- Events: 100 m, 200 m
- Coached by: Mel Rosen

Daron Council (born December 26, 1964) is an American former sprinter. He represented his country in the 200 meters at the 1991 World Indoor Championships reaching the semifinals.

He graduated from Auburn University in 1987.

== International competitions ==
Year	Competition	Venue	Position	Event	Notes
Representing the United States
1989	World Cup	Barcelona, Spain	1st	4 × 100 m relay	38.29
1990	Goodwill Games	Seattle, United States	7th	200 m	21.33
1990	Goodwill Games	Seattle, United States	1st	4 × 100 m relay	38.45
1991	World Indoor Championships	Seville, Spain	15th (sf)	200 m	21.74

== Personal bests ==
Outdoor

- 100 meters – 10.17 (+0.5 m/s, Tampa 1988)
- 200 meters – 20.29 (+1.5 m/s, Starkville 1985)

Indoor

- 60 meters – 6.63 (Fairfax 1990)
- 200 meters – 20.96 (Gainesville 1991)
