= Luc Viudès =

French shot putter

Personal information
- Born: 31 January 1956 (age 70) Perregeaux, France

Sport
- Sport: Track and field
Medal record
Representing France
European Indoor Championships
Silver medal – second place	1981 Sindelfingen	Shot put
Mediterranean Games
Bronze medal – third place	1991 Athens	Shot put

Luc Viudès (born 31 January 1956) is a retired French shot putter.

Viudès won the silver medal at the 1981 European Indoor Championships, finished tenth at the 1982 European Indoor Championships and sixteenth at the 1990 European Indoor Championships. He won the gold medal at the 1989 Jeux de la Francophonie, and the bronze medal at the 1991 Mediterranean Games, He also competed at the 1991 World Championships without reaching the final. Viudès became French champion in 1979, 1981, 1982, 1984, 1985, 1986, 1987, 1988, 1989, 1990, 1991, 1992 and 1993, and French indoor champion in 1981, 1984, 1988, 1990, 1992 and 1993.

His personal best throw was 19.84 metres, achieved in July 1986 in Joinville.
