= Francesco Bennici =

Italian long-distance runner

Personal information
- Nationality: Italian
- Born: 3 October 1971 (age 54) Mazzarino, Italy
- Height: 1.71 m (5 ft 7 in)
- Weight: 50 kg (110 lb)

Sport
- Country: Italy
- Sport: Athletics
- Event: Long-distance running
- Club: C.S. Esercito

Achievements and titles
- Personal bests: 5000 m: 13:29.41 (1992); 10,000 m: 27:56.74 (1992); Half Marathon: 1:02:28 (2000); Marathon: 2:11:16 (2005)
Medal record
Mediterranean Games
Silver medal – second place	1991 Athens	10,000 metres
Military World Games
Bronze medal – third place	2003 Catania	10,000 metres
World Junior Championships
Bronze medal – third place	1990 Plovdiv	5000 metres

Francesco Bennici (born 3 October 1971) is a former Italian long-distance runner who competed at the 1992 Summer Olympics.

== Biography ==
He won two medals at senior level at the International athletics competitions. He also was the only medal for Italy at 1990 World Junior Championships in Athletics.
