= Abdelali Kasbane =

Moroccan sprinter (born 1962)

Personal information
- Born: 15 November 1962 (age 63)

Sport
- Sport: Track and field
Medal record
Representing Morocco
African Championships
Silver medal – second place	1990 Cairo	4×400 m
Mediterranean Games
Bronze medal – third place	1987 Latakia	4x400m relay
Bronze medal – third place	1991 Athens	400m
Bronze medal – third place	1991 Athens	4x400m relay

Abdelali Kasbane (born 15 November 1962) is a Moroccan sprinter who specialized in the 400 metres. Moroccan record holder in 400 M: 45"95 Soria August 4, 1990 Spain. Champion of Spain 400m sprint 1990 Jerez de la frontera Spain. 2° Champion of Spain 400M:45"97 Sprint Barcelona 1991. 2° Champion of Spain Sprint 200M:21"20 Valence 1992.

Kasbane finished seventh in 4 × 400 metres relay at the 1991 World Championships, together with teammates Ali Dahane, Bouchaib Belkaid and Benyounés Lahlou.

Kasbane won bronze medals at the 1987 and 1991 Mediterranean Games
