= Nadia Falvo =

Italian middle-distance runner

Personal information
- Nationality: Italian
- Born: 4 April 1963 (age 63)

Sport
- Country: Italy
- Sport: Athletics
- Event: Middle-distance running

Achievements and titles
- Personal bests: 800 m: 2:01.25 (1991); 800 m indoor:2:05.94 (1992)
Medal record
1991 Mediterranean Games
| Bronze medal – third place | 1991 Athens | 800 m |

Nadia Falvo (born 4 April 1963) is a former Italian female middle-distance runner who currently holds a national record with the relay national team.

== Biography ==
She won 3 national championships at senior level.

== National records ==
- 4x800 metres relay: '8:18.3 ( (United Kingdom) Sheffield, 5 June 1992) - with Nicoletta Tozzi, Stefania Savi, Fabia Trabaldo - current holder.

== National titles ==
- Italian Athletics Championships
  - 800 m: 1992
- Italian Athletics Indoor Championships
  - 800 m: 1993, 1992

== See aldo ==
- List of Italian records in athletics
