= Bouchaib Belkaid =

Moroccan sprinter (born 1967)

Bouchaib Belkaid (Arabic: بوشعيب بلقايد; born May 23, 1967) is a Moroccan sprinter.

Belkaid finished seventh in 4 x 400 metres relay at the 1991 World Championships, together with teammates Abdelali Kasbane, Ali Dahane and Benyounés Lahlou.
