= Éric Perrot (sprinter) =

French sprinter

Personal information
- Born: 26 August 1969 (age 56) Melun, France

Achievements and titles
- Personal best(s): 60 m: 6.70i (Liévin 1991); 100 m : 10.33 (Noisy-le-Grand 1994); 200 m : 20.90 (Dijon 1991)
Medal record
Men's athletics
Representing France
European Championships
Gold medal – first place	1994 Helsinki	4 × 100 m relay
Mediterranean Games
Bronze medal – third place	1991 Athens	4 × 100 m relay

Éric Perrot (born 26 August 1969) is a retired French sprinter who specialized in the 100 and 200 metres. He most notably won a gold medal in the 4 × 100 m relay at the 1994 European Athletics Championships.
