= Luis Rodríguez (sprinter) =

Spanish athlete

Personal information
- Nationality: Spanish
- Born: Luis Rodríguez; 19 August 1966 (age 59)

Sport
- Sport: Track and Field
- Event: 100 metres

Achievements and titles
- Personal bests: Outdoor; 100 m: 10.27 (Seville 1990); 200 m: 20.91 (Salamanca 1992); Indoor; 60 m: 6.74 (Genova 1992); 200 m: 21.43 (Seville 1991)

Luis Rodríguez (born 19 August 1966) is a Spanish former sprinter and coach. He competed for Spain at the 1991 IAAF World Indoor Championships and at the 1990 European Athletics Championships. He coaches his niece, Spanish Olympic sprinter María Isabel Pérez.

== Running career ==
He specialised as a sprinter and competed at an elite level during a career that lasted 16 years. He is one of a few Spaniards who beat Canadian sprinter Ben Johnson in a race. He was a member of the Spanish 4 x 100 metres relay team which finished sixth overall in the final of the 1990 European Athletics Championships in Split, Yugoslavia, running alongside Florencio Gascón, Enrique Talavera and José Javier Arqués.

Rodriguez competed for Spain at the 1991 IAAF World Indoor Championships in Seville both individually, and as part of the 4 × 100 metres relay. He finished fifth in his heat in the 200 metres and qualified for the semi-finals. He ran a personal best of 10.27 seconds for the 100 metres in May 1990 in Seville. His personal best 200 metres time was 20.91 seconds, recorded in Salamanca in July 1992.

== Coaching career ==
He began coaching his niece María Isabel Pérez at a young age. Perez has said she was inspired to start athletics at the age of seven years-old partly through watching her uncle compete. She progressed to compete for Spain at numerous major championships including the 2020 Olympic Games in Tokyo. He remained her coach when she broke the Spanish national record in the 60 metres in 2024 and secured a place to compete at the 2024 Paris Olympics.

== Personal life ==
He is from Seville in Andalusia. He is the uncle of Spanish athlete María Isabel Pérez.
