= Alper Kasapoğlu =

Turkish athlete

Personal information
- Nationality: Turkish
- Born: 8 January 1966 (age 59); Razgrad, Bulgaria

Sport
- Sport: Athletics
- Event: Decathlon

Alper Kasapoğlu (born 8 January 1966) is a Turkish athlete. He competed in the men's decathlon at the 1992 Summer Olympics and the 1996 Summer Olympics.
