= Olivier Noirot =

French sprinter

Personal information
- Nationality: France
- Born: 26 August 1969 (age 57) Bordeaux

Sport
- Event: 400 m

Achievements and titles
- National finals: former holder of French 400 m record

Olivier Noirot (French: [ɔlivje nwaʁo]; born 26 August 1969, at Bordeaux) is a former French athlete, who specialised in the 400 meters.

== Career ==
Running for club ASPTT Bordeaux, Olivier Noirot is the son of middle-distance runner André Noirot and specialist in 400 meters Monique Wideman, both of whom were Champions of France several times in the 1950s and 1960s. In 1989 Olivier won his first national title in the 400 m 46.29s and then won the title the following year over the same distance in the time of 46.04s. He made his debut on the international stage on the occasion of the 1990 European Championships at Split where he was eliminated in the semifinals of the individual competition, and placed seventh in the 4 × 400 relay with his French teammates.

On 28 July 1991 Olivier Noirot set a new record for the French 400m race in 45.07s on the occasion of French Championships at Dijon, improving by two hundredths of a second the time of Aldo Canti which dated from 1984. He was eliminated in the semifinals of the 1993 World Championships, in which he participated in the heats of the 4 × 400 m relay.

On 11 October 1993 Olivier Noirot was seriously injured in a traffic accident which occurred in the Gauriaguet near Bordeaux. His injuries included suffering a ruptured spleen. The driver, his father André Noirot, was killed instantly.

== Prize list ==
- France record in the 400m in 1991 with 45.07s (improved by Marc Raquil in 2001).
- France champion in the 400m in 1989, 1990 and 1991.
- Champion of France indoors 400m in 1990 and 1993.
