= Fabrizio Borellini =

Italian high jumper

Personal information
- Born: 5 July 1968 (age 57) Modena, Italy

Sport
- Country: Italy
- Sport: Athletics
- Event: High jump

Achievements and titles
- Personal best: High jump: 2.30 m (7 ft 7 in) (1988)
Medal record
Mediterranean Games
Bronze medal – third place	1991 Athens	High jump

Fabrizio Borellini (born 5 July 1968) is a retired Italian high jumper.

He won one medal at the International athletics competitions.

== Biography ==
World Junior Championships Athens 1986 finished thirteenth place

European Junior Championships Birmingham 1987 finished in seventh place

He finished fourth at the 1988 European Indoor Championships with the Italian record absolute Indoor meters 2,30

1988 Summer Olympics in Seoul fourteenth place

Italian Record Outdoor Under 23 1988

Bronze medal at the 1991 Mediterranean Games.

World Championships Tokyo 1991 eighth place

He became Italian high jump champion in 1987 - 1991, and indoor champion in 1987 - 1994 - 1998

His personal best jump is 2.30 metres (7 ft 7 in)achieved in May 1988 in Rome. He had 2.30 metres (7 ft 7 in) on the indoor track, achieved at the 1988 European Indoor Championships in Budapest.

== Achievements ==
Year	Competition	Venue	Position	Event	Notes
Representing Italy
1986	World Junior Championships	Athens, Greece	13th (q)	High jump	2.11 m
1988	European Indoor Championships	Budapest, Hungary	4th	High jump	2.30 m
1991	1991 World Athletics Outdoor Championships	Tokyo Japan	8th	High Jump	2,28

== National titles ==
Fabrizio Borellini has won '5’ times the individual national championship.

- 2 win in High jump (1987) (1991)
- 3 wins in High jump indoor (1987) (1994) (1998)

== See also ==
- Italian all-time top lists - High jump
