= Ali Dahane =

Moroccan sprinter

Medal record

Men's athletics

Representing Morocco

African Championships
Silver medal – second place	1990 Cairo	4×400 m

Ali Dahane (born 1967) is a Moroccan sprinter.

Dahane finished seventh in 4 x 400 metres relay at the 1991 World Championships, together with teammates Abdelali Kasbane, Bouchaib Belkaid and Benyounés Lahlou.
