= Mario Longo =

Italian sprinter

Personal information
- Nationality: Italian
- Born: August 21, 1964 (age 61) Naples, Italy
- Height: 1.75 m (5 ft 9 in)
- Weight: 65 kg (143 lb)

Sport
- Country: Italy
- Sport: Athletics
- Event: Sprint

Achievements and titles
- Personal bests: 60 m indoor: 6.65 (1992); 100 m: 10.32 (1998); 200 m: 21.18 (1998)
Medal record
Men's athletics
Representing Italy
European Championships
Bronze medal – third place	1990 Split	4x100 m
Mediterranean Games
Gold medal – first place	1991 Athens	4x100 m

Mario Longo (born 21 August 1964 in Naples) is a retired Italian sprinter who specialized in the 100 metres.

== Biography ==
His personal best 100 metres time was 10.32 seconds, his personal best 200 metres time was 21.18 seconds. Both times were achieved in May 1998 in Naples. He continued his racing career in masters athletics, also achieving some excellent results and records. For example, on 9 January 2010, in Ancona, Italy, he sets the world record master, with the time of 6.97, in the M45 category.

== Achievements ==
Year	Competition	Venue	Position	Event	Time	Notes
1990	European Championships	(Socialist Federal Republic of Yugoslavia) Split	3rd	4 × 100 m relay	38.39	
1991	World Championships	(Japan) Tokyo	5th	4 × 100 m relay	38.52	
1992	European Indoor Championships	(United Kingdom) Glasgow	8th	60 m	6.77	

=== Masters athletics ===
Longo won three-time outdoor World Masters Athletics Championships.

Year	Competition	Venue	Position	Event	Time	Notes
2007	World Championships	(Italy) Riccione	1st	100 m M40	10.96	
2007	World Championships	(Italy) Riccione	1st	200 m M40	22.29	
2007	World Championships	(Italy) Riccione	1st	4 × 100 m relay M40	42.94	

== See also ==
- List of European records in masters athletics
- List of Italian records in masters athletics
- Italy national relay team
