= Fikret Özsoy =

Turkish javelin thrower

Personal information
- National team: Turkey
- Born: 1 January 1965 (age 60)

Sport
- Event: Javelin throw

Fikret Özsoy (born 1 January 1965) is a Turkish male javelin thrower and record holder. His record throw, of 75.82 metres, was achieved in Rimini, Italy on 30 May 1992.

== Achievements ==
Year	Competition	Venue	Position	Notes
Representing Turkey
1990	European Championships	Split, FR Yugoslavia	29th	68.86 m
1995	World Championships	Gothenburg, Sweden	26th	73.50 m
