= Valérie Jean-Charles =

French sprinter (born 1969)

Valérie Jean-Charles (born 27 January 1969 in Paris) is a French track and field athlete, who specialises in the 200 meters. Jean-Charles competed in the women's 200 m at the 1992 Summer Olympics.
