= Marco Baffi =

Italian decathlete

Personal information
- Nationality: Italian
- Born: 1 March 1964 (age 62)

Sport
- Country: Italy
- Sport: Athletics
- Event: Combined events

Achievements and titles
- Personal bests: Decathlon: 7763 (1991); Heptathlon indoor: 5560 (1992)

Marco Baffi (born 1 March 1964) is an Italian male retired decathlete, which participated at the 1991 World Championships in Athletics.

== Personal best ==
- Decathlon: 7763 pts ( (Italy) Brescia, 19 May 1991)
  - 100 m: 11.26 (+1.0), long jump: 7.08 m, shot put: 13.88 m, high jump: 2.03 m, 400 m: 49.58;
  - 110 m hs: 15.34 (+0.9), discus throw: 44.84 m, pole vault: 4.70 m, javelin throw: 52.80 m, 1500 m: 4:34.08

== Achievements ==
Year	Competition	Venue	Position	Event	Performance	Notes
1991	World Championships	(Japan) Tokyo	22nd	Decathlon	6209 pts	
1992	European Indoor Championships	(Italy) Genoa	9th	Heptathlon	5560 pts	PB

== See also ==
- Italian all-time top lists - Decathlon
