= Donatella Dal Bianco =

Italian sprinter (born 1968)

Personal information
- Nationality: Italian
- Born: November 7, 1968 (age 57) Schio, Italy

Sport
- Country: Italy
- Sport: Athletics
- Event: Sprint

Achievements and titles
- Personal best: 200 m: 23.46 (1990)
Medal record
Mediterranean Games
Silver medal – second place	1991 Athens	4×100 m relay
Silver medal – second place	1993 Narbonne	4×100 m relay
Bronze medal – third place	1993 Narbonne	200 metres

Donatella Dal Bianco (born 7 November 1968) is a former Italian sprint athlete.

Her best result at international level was the 7th place in the 4×100 metres relay at 1991 World Championships in Tokyo.

== Biography ==
She won three medals, to senior level, two of these with the national relay team at the International athletics competitions. She has 12 caps in national team from 1987 to 1995.

== Achievements ==
Year	Competition	Venue	Position	Event	Notes
Representing Italy
1986	World Junior Championships	Athens, Greece	18th (sf)	200m	24.68 (wind: +0.5 m/s)
1991	World Championships	Tokyo, Japan	7th	4×100 metres relay	43.76

== National titles ==
Donatella Dal Bianco has won 3 times the individual national championship.

- 3 wins in the 200 metres indoor (1990, 1992, 1995)

== See also ==
- Italy national relay team
