= Tonino Viali =

Italian middle-distance runner

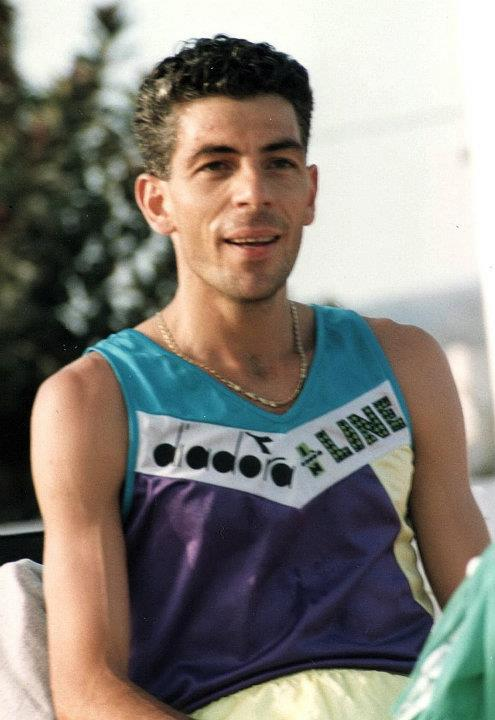

Personal information
- Nationality: Italian
- Born: September 16, 1960 (age 65) Terni, Italy
- Height: 1.79 m (5 ft 10 1/2 in)
- Weight: 70 kg (154 lb)

Sport
- Country: Italy
- Sport: Athletics
- Event: 800 metres
- Club: G.S. Fiamme Oro

Achievements and titles
- Personal best: 800 m: 1:45.32 (1990)
Medal record
Representing Italy
World Indoor Championships
Bronze medal – third place	1989 Budapest	800 metres
European Indoor Championships
Bronze medal – third place	1992 Genoa	800 metres
Mediterranean Games
Bronze medal – third place	1991 Athens	800 metres

Tonino Viali (born 16 September 1960) is a retired Italian middle-distance runner who specialized in the 800 metres.

== Achievements ==
Year	Competition	Venue	Position	Event	Notes
Representing Italy
1989	World Indoor Championships	Budapest, Hungary	3rd	800 m	1:46.95
1989	European Indoor Championships	The Hague, Netherlands	8th	1500 m	3:51.01
1990	European Championships	Split, Yugoslavia	6th	800 m	1:46.04
1991	Mediterranean Games	Athens, Greece	3rd	800 m	1:47.86
1992	European Indoor Championships	Genoa, Italy	3rd	800 m	1:47.22

== National titles ==
Tonino Viali has won 10 times the individual national championship.

- 4 wins in 800 metres (1987, 1989, 1990, 1991)
- 1 win in 1500 metres (1994)
- 4 wins in 800 metres indoor (1986, 1987, 1988, 1992)
- 1 win in 1500 metres indoor (1989)

== See also ==
- 800 metres winners of Italian Athletics Championships
- 1500 metres winners of Italian Athletics Championships
