= Rossella Tarolo =

Italian sprinter

Personal information
- Nationality: Italian
- Born: December 28, 1964 (age 61) Treviso, Italy
- Height: 1.74 m (5 ft 8 1/2 in)
- Weight: 53 kg (117 lb)

Sport
- Country: Italy
- Sport: Athletics
- Event: Sprint
- Club: Snia Milano

Achievements and titles
- Personal best: 100 m: 11.45 (1986)
Medal record
Mediterranean Games
Silver medal – second place	1991 Athens	4×100 m relay

Rossella Tarolo (born 28 December 1964) is a former Italian sprinter who represented Italy at the 1988 Olympic Games in Seoul, South Korea.

== Biography ==
Tarolo was born in Treviso, Italy. She is a four time Italian National Champion and represented Italy 30 times in international competition from 1984 to 1993. She participated at the 1988 Olympic Games in Seoul.

== Achievements ==
Year	Competition	Venue	Position	Event	Performance	Notes
1986	European Indoor Championships	Madrid, Spain	heats	60 meters	DNF	
1986	European Indoor Championships	Madrid, Spain	heats	200 metres	24.34	
1986	European Championships	Stuttgart, Germany	heats	4 × 100 m relay	44.90	
1988	Olympic Games	Seoul, South Korea	heats	100 metres	11.86	
1988	Olympic Games	Seoul, South Korea	semi-final	4×100 metres relay	43.97	
1990	European Championships	Split, Yugoslavia	semi-final	200 metres	23.56	
1990	European Championships	Split, Yugoslavia	5th	4×100 metres relay	43.71	
1991	Mediterranean Games	Athens, Greece	4th	200 m	23.54	
1991	Mediterranean Games	Athens, Greece	2nd	4×100 metres relay	43.67	
1991	World Championships	Tokyo, Japan	quarter-final	100 metres	11.75	
1991	World Championships	Tokyo, Japan	7th	4×100 metres relay	43.76	

== National titles ==
- Italian National 100 metres Champion (1986)
- Two-time Italian National 200 metres Champion (1989, 1991)
- Italian Indoor 200 metres Champion (1986)

== See also ==
- Italian all-time lists - 200 metres
