= Fausto Frigerio =

Italian hurdler and long jumper (born 1966)

Personal information
- Nationality: Italian
- Born: 13 February 1966 (age 60) Vimercate, Italy

Sport
- Country: Italy
- Sport: Athletics
- Event(s): 110 metres hurdles Long jump

Achievements and titles
- Personal bests: 110 m hs: 13.64 (1993); Long jump: 8.15 m (1990)
Medal record
| Event | 1st | 2nd | 3rd |
|---|---|---|---|
| Mediterranean Games | 0 | 1 | 1 |
| European Junior Championships | 0 | 0 | 1 |

Fausto Frigerio (born 13 February 1966 in Vimercate) is a retired Italian hurdler and long jumper.

== Biography ==
He won the bronze medals at the 1985 European Athletics Junior Championships behind Jon Ridgeon and Colin Jackson and at the 1991 Mediterranean Games. At the 1991 Mediterranean Games, he also won the silver medal in the long jump. He participated at the World Championships in 1991 (long jump) and 1993 (hurdles) without reaching the final.

His personal best time is 13.64 seconds, achieved in July 1993 in Sestriere. The Italian record currently belongs to Emanuele Abate with 13.28 seconds. His personal best long jump was 8.15 metres, achieved in July 1990 in Cagliari.

== National titles ==
He has won 4 times the individual national championship.

- 2 wins in the 110 metres hurdles (1989, 1993)
- 1 win in the long jump (1991)
- 1 win in the long jump indoor (1993)

== See also ==
- Italian all-time top lists - Long jump
