= Nadia Dandolo =

Italian long-distance runner (born 1962)

Personal information
- National team: Italy: 20 caps (1980-1997)
- Born: 11 September 1962 (age 63) Borgoricco, Italy

Sport
- Sport: Athletics
- Event(s): Long-distance running Cross country running
- Club: Fiamma Vicenza (1980-1991); Snam Gas Metano (1992-1993); G.S. Forestale (1994-2000); Bracco Atletica (2002); Atletica ASI Veneto (2003-2012); ASI Atletica Roma (2013-)

Achievements and titles
- Personal bests: 3000 m: 8:44.36 (1991); 5000 m: 15:11.64 (1990); 10,000 m: 32:02.37 (1990)
Medal record
Mediterranean Games
Silver medal – second place	1991 Athens	3000 m
World Cross Country Championships
Silver medal – second place	1982 Rome	Team
Bronze medal – third place	1981 Madrid	Team

Nadia Dandolo (born 11 September 1962) is a former Italian long-distance runner, two-time it the top eight at European Championships (1990, 1992) and one at the European Indoor Championships (1991).

== Biography ==
She won the silver medal in the 3000 metres at the 1991 Mediterranean Games. She competed at the IAAF World Cross Country Championships on six occasions, finishing in fifth place at the 1990 and 1992 editions. Her ninth-place finish at the 1982 competition in Rome earned her the women's team silver medal. She also won the Cinque Mulini cross country race in 1990.

She has continued running into the Masters division, winning the W50 5000 metres at the 2015 World Masters Athletics Championships, in a time superior to the winners in all three younger divisions (for women almost 18 years younger).

== Personal bests ==
Event	Time (min)	Venue	Date
3000 m	8:44.36	Stockholm, Sweden	3 July 1991
5000 m	15:11.64	Bologna, Italy	18 July 1990

== Achievements ==
Senior

Year	Competition	Venue	Rank	Event	Time	Notes
1981	World Cross Country Championships	(Spain) Madrid	46th	Long race (4.41 km)	15:13	
1981	World Cross Country Championships	(Spain) Madrid	3rd	Team competition	89 pts	
1982	European Indoor Championships	(Italy) Milan	5th	3000 m	9:03.59	
1982	World Cross Country Championships	(Italy) Rome	9th	Long race (4.663 km)	14:57.9	
1982	World Cross Country Championships	(Italy) Rome	2nd	Team competition	57 pts	
1983	World Cross Country Championships	(United Kingdom) Gateshead	25th	Long race (4.072 km)	14:24	
1990	World Cross Country Championships	(France) Aix-les-Bains	5th	Long race (6 km)	19:39	
1990	European Championships	(Socialist Federal Republic of Yugoslavia) Split	5th	10,000 m	32:02.37	NR
1991	World Cross Country Championships	(Belgium) Antwerp	26th	Long race (6.425 km)	21:17	
1991	Mediterranean Games	(Greece) Athens	2nd	3000 m	8:46.94	
1992	World Cross Country Championships	(United States) Boston	5th	Long race (6.37 km)	21:35	
1994	European Championships	(Finland) Helsinki	8th	3000 m	8:49.42	
1994	IAAF Grand Prix Final	(France) Paris	7th	5000 m	15:25.02	

Masters

Year	Competition	Venue	Rank	Event	Time	Notes
2009	World Masters Championships	(Finland) Lahti	2nd	5000 m W45	17:23.08	
2015	World Masters Championships	(France) Lyon	1st	5000 m W50	8:10.21	
2019	World Masters Indoor Championships	(Poland) Toruń	1st	Half marathon W55	1:24:59	NR

== National titles ==
Dandolo won four national championships at individual senior level.

- Italian Athletics Championships
  - 3000 m: 1991 (1)
- Italian Cross Country Championships
  - Long race: 1990, 1991, 1992 (3)

== See also ==
- Italian team at the running events
- Italian all-time top lists - 3000 metres
- Italian all-time top lists - 5000 metres
- Italian all-time top lists - 10000 metres
- List of Italian records in masters athletics
