= Luciano Zerbini =

Italian discus thrower and shot putter

Personal information
- Nationality: Italian
- Born: 16 February 1960 (age 66) Lazise, Italy
- Height: 194 cm (6 ft 4 in)
- Weight: 115 kg (254 lb)

Sport
- Sport: Athletics
- Event(s): Shot put Discus throw
- Club: G.S. Fiamme Oro
- Retired: 1978

Achievements and titles
- Personal bests: Shot put: 20.54 m (1992); Discus throw: 64.26 m (1993)
Medal record
Representing Italy
Mediterranean Games
Gold medal – first place	1991 Athens	Discus throw
Gold medal – first place	1993 Narbonne	Discus throw

Luciano Zerbini (born 16 February 1960) is an Italian retired Olympic discus thrower and shot putter.

== Biography ==
Born in Lazise, Verona, Zebrini represented Italy at two Summer Olympics, starting in 1984 in Los Angeles, California. There he ended up in 7th place in the Men's Discus Throw competition. Zerbini then competed for Italy at the 1992 Summer Olympics. 1993 doping case.

== Personal bests ==
- Shot Put — 20.54 (1992)
- Discus Throw — 64.26 (1993)

== See also ==
- Italian all-time lists - Shot put
- Italian all-time lists - Discus throw
