= Fabia Trabaldo =

Italian middle-distance runner

Personal information
- Nationality: Italian
- Born: 5 March 1972 (age 54) Borgosesia, Italy
- Height: 1.68 m (5 ft 6 in)
- Weight: 53 kg (117 lb)

Sport
- Country: Italy
- Sport: Athletics
- Event: Middle distance running
- Club: Snam Gas Metano

Achievements and titles
- Personal bests: 800 m: 1:59.51 (1992); 1000 m: 2:35.06 (1992); 1500 m: 4:03.82 (1993); One mile: 4:38.07 (1993)
Medal record
Mediterranean Games
Silver medal – second place	1993 Narbonne	800 metres

Fabia Trabaldo (born 5 March 1972 in Borgosesia, Vercelli) is a retired Italian middle distance runner who specialized in the 800 and 1500 metres.

== Biography ==
She won one medal, at senior level, at the International athletics competitions. She has 12 caps in national team from 1988 to 1994.

== Achievements ==
Year	Competition	Venue	Position	Event	Notes
Representing Italy
1990	World Junior Championships	Plovdiv, Bulgaria	7th	800m	2:06.95
1991	European Junior Championships	Thessaloniki, Greece	2nd	800 m	2:04.75
1991	European Junior Championships	Thessaloniki, Greece	2nd	1500 m	4:15.78
1993	World Championships	Stuttgart, Germany	8th	1500 m	4:08.23
1993	Mediterranean Games	Narbonne, France	2nd	800 m	2:04.05
1994	European Indoor Championships	Paris, France	9th	1500 m	4:18.12

== National titles ==
Fabia Trabaldo has won 4 times the individual national championship.

- 1 win in the 800 metres (1991)
- 3 wins in the 1500 metres (1991, 1992, 1993)
