= Fabio De Gaspari =

Italian javelin thrower

Personal information
- Nationality: Italian
- Born: 4 December 1966 Padua, Italy

Sport
- Country: Italy
- Sport: Athletics
- Event: Javelin throw
Medal record
Representing Italy
Mediterranean Games
| Silver medal – second place | 1991 Athens | Javelin throw |
| Silver medal – second place | 1993 Languedoc-Roussillon | Javelin throw |

Fabio De Gaspari (born 4 December 1966) is a retired javelin thrower from Italy.

== Biography ==
He won a total of nine national titles during his career. His mother, Giancarla Spagolla, was a javelin thrower as well. He competed at the 1983 and 1987 World Championships.

== Achievements ==
| Year | Competition | Venue | Position | Notes |
Representing Italy
| 1987 | World Championships | Rome, Italy | 32nd | 70.76 m |
| 1989 | National Championships | Cesenatico, Italy | 1st | 79.30 m (PB) |
| 1991 | Mediterranean Games | Athens, Greece | 2nd | 73.10 m |
| 1993 | National Championships | Bologna, Italy | 1st | 79.02 m |
| 1993 | Mediterranean Games | Languedoc-Roussillon, France | 2nd | 77.18 m |
| 1993 | World Championships | Stuttgart, Germany | 27th | 74.34 m |

== National titles ==
De Gaspari won 11 national championships at individual senior level.

- Italian Athletics Championships
  - Javelin throw: 1987, 1988, 1989, 1990, 1991, 1992, 1993, 1996, 1997 (9)
- Italian Winter Throwing Championships
  - Javelin throw: 1985, 1992 (2)

== See also ==
- Italian all-time lists - Javelin throw
