= Agnese Maffeis =

Italian discus thrower and shot putter

Personal information
- Nationality: Italian
- Born: 9 March 1965 (age 61) Bergamo, Italy

Sport
- Country: Italy
- Sport: Athletics
- Events: Discus throw Shot put
- Club: Snam Gas Metano

Achievements and titles
- Personal bests: Shot put 17.76 m (1998); Discus throw: 63.66 m (1996)
Medal record
Mediterranean Games
Gold medal – first place	1987 Latakia	Shot put
Gold medal – first place	1991 Athens	Discus throw
Gold medal – first place	1993 Narbonne	Shot put
Gold medal – first place	1993 Narbonne	Discus throw
Silver medal – second place	1991 Athens	Shot put
Silver medal – second place	2001 Tunis	Discus throw

Agnese Maffeis (born 9 March 1965, in Bergamo) is an Italian discus thrower and shot putter. She won six medals, at senior level, at the International athletics competitions.

She has 73 caps in national team from 1981 to 2003, second Italian athlete of all-time behind Marisa Masullo that have 79 caps.

== Biography ==
She finished twelfth at the 1989 World Indoor Championships and eighth at the 1997 World Championships. She also competed in the 1996 Olympics, but failed to qualify from her pool. At the Mediterranean Games she won gold medals in shot put in 1987 and 1993 and in discus in 1991 and 1993. She won a silver medal in shot put in 1991 and in discus in 2001.

Her personal best throw currently stands at 63.66 metres, achieved in June 1996 in Milan. She is married to Alessandro Andrei.

== Achievements ==
Year	Competition	Venue	Position	Event	Notes
1992	Olympic Games	Barcelona, Spain	10th	Discus	61.22 m

== National titles ==
Agnese Maffeis has won 38 times the individual national championship (Italian all-time record-woman).

- 5 wins in the shot put (1989, 1990, 1991, 1992, 1993)
- 14 wins in the discus throw (1989, 1990, 1991, 1992, 1993, 1995, 1996, 1997, 1998, 2000, 2001, 2002, 2003, 2004)
- 9 wins in the shot put indoor (1986, 1987, 1988, 1989, 1990, 1991, 1992, 1993, 1994)
- 10 wins in the discus throw at the Italian Winter Throwing Championships (1986, 1992, 1994, 1996, 1998, 1999, 2001, 2002, 2003, 2004)

== See also ==
- Italian Athletics Championships - Multi winners
- Italy national athletics team - Women's more caps
- Italian all-time lists - Shot put
- Italian all-time lists - Discus throw
