= 1991 Mediterranean Games =

11th edition of the Mediterranean Games

XI Mediterranean Games Athens 1991
- Host city: Athens, Greece
- Nations: 18
- Athletes: 2,762
- Events: 214 in 24 sports
- Opening: 28 June 1991
- Closing: 12 July 1991
- Opened by: President of the Hellenic Republic Konstantinos Karamanlis
- Main venue: Olympic Stadium

The XI Mediterranean Games, commonly known as the 1991 Mediterranean Games, were the 11th Mediterranean Games. The Games were held in Athens, Greece, from 28 June to 12 July 1991, where 2,762 athletes (2,176 men and 586 women) from 18 countries participated. There were a total of 214 medal events from 24 different sports.

== Participating nations ==
The following is a list of nations that participated in the 1991 Mediterranean Games:

- Albania (146)
- Algeria (102)
- Cyprus (79)
- Egypt (156)
- France (325)
- Greece (437)
- Italy (403)
- Lebanon (56)
- Libya (22)
- Malta (15)
- Monaco (8)
- Morocco (138)
- San Marino (36)
- Spain (339)
- Syria (29)
- Tunisia (82)
- Turkey (206)
- Yugoslavia (185)

== Sports ==
23 sports were contested at the 1991 Mediterranean Games.

- Athletics
- Basketball
- Boxing
- Canoeing
- Cycling
- Diving
- Equestrian
- Fencing
- Football
- Gymnastics
- Golf
- Handball
- Judo
- Rowing
- Sailing
- Shooting
- Swimming
- Table tennis
- Tennis
- Volleyball
- Water polo
- Weightlifting
- Wrestling

== Medal table ==
* Host nation (Greece)

Rank	Nation	Gold	Silver	Bronze	Total
1	Italy	67	49	52	168
2	France	48	57	34	139
3	Turkey	23	11	12	46
4	Spain	22	39	49	110
5	Yugoslavia	16	13	9	38
6	Greece*	9	21	30	60
7	Algeria	9	3	5	17
8	Egypt	8	10	17	35
9	Morocco	5	5	10	20
10	Syria	4	2	5	11
11	Cyprus	1	2	1	4
12	Lebanon	1	1	1	3
13	Tunisia	1	0	5	6
14	Albania	0	4	4	8
Totals (14 entries)		214	217	234	665
