= List of Greek Athletics Championships winners =

The Greek Athletics Championships (Greek: Πανελλήνιο πρωτάθλημα στίβου) is an annual track and field competition which serves as the national championship for Greece. It is organised by the Hellenic Amateur Athletic Association, Greece's national governing body for the sport of athletics. The winner of each event at the championships is declared the national champion for that year. The men's and women's championships are contested separately, with the men's championships first being held in 1896 and the women's in 1930. Greek Cypriot athletes frequently compete at the championships and there have been several Cypriot winners.

== Men ==
=== 100 metres ===
- 1983: Kosmas Stratos
- 1984: Theodoros Gatsios
- 1985: Kosmas Stratos
- 1986: Kosmas Stratos
- 1987: Michalis Vagenas
- 1988: Kosmas Stratos
- 1989: ?
- 1990: Kostas Lambropoulos
- 1991: Alexandros Yenovelis
- 1992: Georgios Panagiotopoulos
- 1993: Alexandros Terzian
- 1994: Alexandros Terzian
- 1995: Alexios Alexopoulos
- 1996: Haralabos Papadias
- 1997: Prodromos Katsantonis (CYP)
- 1998: Haralabos Papadias
- 1999: Georgios Theodoridis
- 2000: Angelos Pavlakakis
- 2001: Konstantinos Kenteris
- 2002: Aristotelis Gavelas
- 2003: Aristotelis Gavelas
- 2004: Konstantinos Kenteris
- 2005: Panagiotis Sarris
- 2006: Anastasios Goussis

=== 200 metres ===
- 1983: Angelos Angelides (CYP)
- 1984: Theodoros Gatsios
- 1985: Georgios Vamvakas
- 1986: Theodoros Gatsios
- 1987: Michalis Vagenas
- 1988: Vassilios Kallipossis
- 1989: ?
- 1990: Charalambos Papanikolaou
- 1991: Georgios Panagiotopoulos
- 1992: Thomas Sbokos
- 1993: Alexandros Terzian
- 1994: Georgios Panagiotopoulos
- 1995: Thomas Sbokos
- 1996: Thomas Sbokos
- 1997: Georgios Panagiotopoulos
- 1998: Prodromos Katsantonis (CYP)
- 1999: Konstantinos Kenteris
- 2000: Anastasios Goussis
- 2001: Prodromos Katsantonis (CYP)
- 2002: Konstantinos Kenteris
- 2003: Georgios Doupis
- 2004: Anastasios Goussis
- 2005: Anastasios Goussis
- 2006: Anastasios Goussis

=== 400 metres ===
- 1983: Panagiotis Stefanapoulos
- 1984: Angelos Soultanis
- 1985: Stergios Kallipossis
- 1986: Vassilios Kallipossis
- 1987: Georgios Panagiotopoulos
- 1988: Georgios Panagiotopoulos
- 1989: ?
- 1990: Charalambos Rethemiotakis
- 1991: Konstantinos Kenteris
- 1992: Konstantinos Kenteris
- 1993: Konstantinos Kenteris
- 1994: Evripides Demosthenous (CYP)
- 1995: Evripides Demosthenous (CYP)
- 1996: Evripides Demosthenous (CYP)
- 1997: Konstantinos Moumoulidis
- 1998: Konstantinos Kenteris
- 1999: Konstantinos Kenteris
- 2000: Anastasios Goussis
- 2001: Anastasios Goussis
- 2002: Stelios Demotsios
- 2003: Stelios Demotsios
- 2004: Anastasios Goussis
- 2005: Dimitrios Gravalos
- 2006: Dimitrios Regas

=== 800 metres ===
- 1983: Vanasios Papoutsis
- 1984: Panagiotis Stefanapoulos
- 1985: Sotirios Moutsanas
- 1986: Sotirios Moutsanas
- 1987: Philippos Stylianoudes (CYP)
- 1988: Nikos Vouzis
- 1989: ?
- 1990: Spyros Christopoulos
- 1991: Fotis Deligiannis
- 1992: Fotis Deligiannis
- 1993: Michalis Anagnostou
- 1994: Michalis Anagnostou
- 1995: Panagiotis Stroubakos
- 1996: Panagiotis Stroubakos
- 1997: Panagiotis Stroubakos
- 1998: Panagiotis Stroubakos
- 1999: Panagiotis Stroubakos
- 2000: Panagiotis Stroubakos
- 2001: Panagiotis Stroubakos
- 2002: Panagiotis Stroubakos
- 2003: Sotirios Papadias
- 2004: Panagiotis Stroubakos
- 2005: Pavlos Farougias
- 2006: Efthimios Papadopoulos

=== 1500 metres ===
- 1983: Arsenios Tsiminos
- 1984: Fotis Kourtis
- 1985: Nikolaos Tsiakoulas
- 1986: Nikolaos Tsiakoulas
- 1987: Sotirios Moutsanas
- 1988: Nikos Vouzis
- 1989: ?
- 1990: Spyros Christopoulos
- 1991: Iosif Kelaidis
- 1992: Panagiotis Stroubakos
- 1993: Spyros Christopoulos
- 1994: Dimitrios Katsoulis
- 1995: Panagiotis Papoulias
- 1996: Stavros Karres
- 1997: Christos Papapetrou (CYP)
- 1998: Panagiotis Papoulias
- 1999: Stathis Stasis (CYP)
- 2000: Stavros Karres
- 2001: Pavlos Farougias
- 2002: Panagiotis Ikonomou
- 2003: Kostas Karakatsanis
- 2004: Kostas Karakatsanis
- 2005: Panagiotis Ikonomou
- 2006: Panagiotis Ikonomou

=== 5000 metres ===
- 1983: Fotis Kourtis
- 1984: Manolis Chantzos
- 1985: Manolis Chantzos
- 1986: Spyros Andriopoulos
- 1987: Panagiotis Fotiou
- 1988: Panagiotis Fotiou
- 1989: ?
- 1990: Spyros Andriopoulos
- 1991: Nikos Vouzis
- 1992: Nikos Vouzis
- 1993: Panagiotis Papoulias
- 1994: Panagiotis Papoulias
- 1995: Panagiotis Charamis
- 1996: Panagiotis Charamis
- 1997: Antonios Vouzis
- 1998: Panagiotis Papoulias
- 1999: Antonios Papantonis
- 2000: Panagiotis Charamis
- 2001: Anastasios Frangos
- 2002: Antonios Papantonis
- 2003: Panagiotis Papoulias
- 2004: Michalis Yelasakis
- 2005: Anastasios Frangos
- 2006: Pantelis Savopoulos

=== 10,000 metres ===
- 1983: Marios Kassianidis
- 1984: Spyros Andriopoulos
- 1985: Spyros Andriopoulos
- 1986: Spyros Andriopoulos
- 1987: Spyros Andriopoulos
- 1988: Savvas Kouburas
- 1989: ?
- 1990: Spyros Andriopoulos
- 1991: Spyros Andriopoulos
- 1992: Manolis Chantzos
- 1993: Manolis Chantzos
- 1994: Panagiotis Charamis
- 1995: Spyros Andriopoulos
- 1996: Panagiotis Charamis
- 1997: Panagiotis Charamis
- 1998: Panagiotis Charamis
- 1999: Antonios Papantonis
- 2000: Panagiotis Charamis
- 2001: Christos Zarkadis
- 2002: Ioannis Kanellopoulos
- 2003: Michalis Yelasakis
- 2004: Michalis Yelasakis
- 2005: Michalis Yelasakis
- 2006: Michalis Yelasakis

=== Marathon ===
- 1983: Anastasios Psathas
- 1984: Michalis Kousis
- 1985: Michalis Kousis
- 1986: Anastasios Psathas
- 1987: Georgios Afordakos
- 1988: Georgios Afordakos
- 1989: Christos Papachristos
- 1990: Georgios Malliaris
- 1991: Theodoros Fotopoulos
- 1992: Christos Sotiropoulos
- 1993: Nikolaos Polias
- 1994: Spyros Andriopoulos
- 1995: Nikolaos Polias
- 1996: Nikolaos Polias
- 1997: Spyros Andriopoulos
- 1998: Nikitas Marakakis
- 1999: Nikolaos Polias
- 2000: Nikolaos Polias
- 2001: Nikolaos Polias
- 2002: Vassilios Zabelis
- 2003: Nikolaos Polias
- 2004: Konstantinos Gougousis
- 2005: Gerasimos Kokotos

=== 3000 metres steeplechase ===
- 1983: Arsenios Tsiminos
- 1984: Fotis Kourtis
- 1985: Kyriakos Moutesidis
- 1986: Kyriakos Moutesidis
- 1987: Christos Papachristos
- 1988: Kyriakos Moutesidis
- 1989: ?
- 1990: Panagiotis Karachalios
- 1991: Stavros Figetakis
- 1992: Antonios Vouzis
- 1993: Antonios Vouzis
- 1994: Antonios Vouzis
- 1995: Antonios Vouzis
- 1996: Georgios Giannelis
- 1997: Antonios Vouzis
- 1998: Georgios Giannelis
- 1999: Georgios Giannelis
- 2000: Nikolaos Maxouris
- 2001: Georgios Kompogiannis
- 2002: Georgios Kompogiannis
- 2003: Christoforos Meroussis
- 2004: Naim Akrout
- 2005: Alexandros Litsis
- 2006: Naim Akrout

=== 110 metres hurdles ===
- 1983: Petros Evripidou (CYP)
- 1984: Georgios Tsiantas
- 1985: Georgios Tsiantas
- 1986: Grigorios Zagoras
- 1987: Stelios Bisbas
- 1988: Stelios Bisbas
- 1989: ?
- 1990: Dimitrios Siatounis
- 1991: Grigorios Siatounis
- 1992: Stelios Bisbas
- 1993: Stelios Bisbas
- 1994: Dimitrios Siatounis
- 1995: Stelios Bisbas
- 1996: Stelios Bisbas
- 1997: Stamatios Magos
- 1998: Dimitrios Siatounis
- 1999: Stamatios Magos
- 2000: Dimitrios Siatounis
- 2001: Dimitrios Pietris
- 2002: Dimitrios Pietris
- 2003: Dimitrios Pietris
- 2004: Ioannis Marakakis
- 2005: Alexandros Theofanov
- 2006: Theopistos Mavridis

=== 400 metres hurdles ===
- 1983: Georgios Vamvakas
- 1984: Georgios Vamvakas
- 1985: Georgios Vamvakas
- 1986: Athanassios Kalogiannis
- 1987: Georgios Vamvakas
- 1988: Athanassios Kalogiannis
- 1989: ?
- 1990: Athanassios Kalogiannis
- 1991: Dimitrios Marinakis
- 1992: Athanassios Kalogiannis
- 1993: Athanassios Kalogiannis
- 1994: Panagiotis Mantelidis
- 1995: Panagiotis Mantelidis
- 1996: Panagiotis Mantelidis
- 1997: Panagiotis Mantelidis
- 1998: Periklis Iakovakis
- 1999: Periklis Iakovakis
- 2000: Periklis Iakovakis
- 2001: Periklis Iakovakis
- 2002: Periklis Iakovakis
- 2003: Periklis Iakovakis
- 2004: Periklis Iakovakis
- 2005: Periklis Iakovakis
- 2006: Periklis Iakovakis

=== High jump ===
- 1983: Panagiotis Panayos
- 1984: Dimitrios Kattis
- 1985: Kosmas Mikhalopoulos
- 1986: Kosmas Mikhalopoulos
- 1987: Panagiotis Kondaxakis
- 1988: Lambros Papakostos
- 1989: ?
- 1990: Lambros Papakostos
- 1991: Lambros Papakostos
- 1992: Lambros Papakostos
- 1993: Lambros Papakostos
- 1994: Dimitrios Kokotis
- 1995: Lambros Papakostos
- 1996: Ioannis Yantsios
- 1997: Lambros Papakostos
- 1998: Dimitrios Kokotis
- 1999: Konstantinos Liapis
- 2000: Lambros Papakostos
- 2001: Dimitrios Syrakos
- 2002: Ioannis Constantinou (CYP)
- 2003: Ioannis Constantinou (CYP)
- 2004: Dimitrios Syrakos
- 2005: Kyriakos Ioannou (CYP)
- 2006: Nikolaos Giosis

=== Pole vault ===
- 1983: Andreas Tsonis
- 1984: Andreas Tsonis
- 1985: Symeon Anastasiadis
- 1986: Andreas Tsonis
- 1987: Dimitrios Kirkos
- 1988: Andreas Tsonis
- 1989: ?
- 1990: Georgios Katsaris
- 1991: Christos Pallakis
- 1992: Christos Pallakis
- 1993: Christos Pallakis
- 1994: Christos Pallakis
- 1995: Christos Pallakis
- 1996: Konstantinos Tsatalos
- 1997: Konstantinos Tzivas
- 1998: Stavros Tsitouras
- 1999: Stavros Tsitouras
- 2000: Marios Evangelou
- 2001: Marios Evangelou
- 2002: Filippos Sgouros
- 2003: Stavros Kouroupakis
- 2004: Marios Evangelou
- 2005: Konstantinos Filippidis
- 2006: Stavros Kouroupakis

=== Long jump ===
- 1983: Dimitrios Delifotis
- 1984: Michalis Filandarakis
- 1985: Charalambos Giannoulis
- 1986: Georgios Tsiantas
- 1987: Theodoros Tantanozis
- 1988: Dimitrios Delifotis
- 1989: ?
- 1990: Konstandinos Koukodimos
- 1991: Konstandinos Koukodimos
- 1992: Konstandinos Koukodimos
- 1993: Spyridon Vasdekis
- 1994: Konstandinos Koukodimos
- 1995: Konstandinos Koukodimos
- 1996: Spyridon Vasdekis
- 1997: Konstandinos Koukodimos
- 1998: Spyridon Vasdekis
- 1999: Konstandinos Koukodimos
- 2000: Konstandinos Koukodimos
- 2001: Konstandinos Koukodimos
- 2002: Konstandinos Koukodimos
- 2003: Louis Tsatoumas
- 2004: Louis Tsatoumas
- 2005: Louis Tsatoumas
- 2006: Louis Tsatoumas

=== Triple jump ===
- 1983: Ioannis Kyriakis
- 1984: Dimitrios Mikhas
- 1985: Charalambos Giannoulis
- 1986: Charalambos Giannoulis
- 1987: Charalambos Giannoulis
- 1988: Marios Hadjiandreou (CYP)
- 1989: ?
- 1990: Theodoros Tantanozis
- 1991: Theodoros Tantanozis
- 1992: Spyros Kourmoussis
- 1993: Theodoros Tantanozis
- 1994: Hristos Meletoglou
- 1995: Marios Hadjiandreou (CYP)
- 1996: Hristos Meletoglou
- 1997: Hristos Meletoglou
- 1998: Hristos Meletoglou
- 1999: Christos Tzortzatos
- 2000: Stamatios Lenis
- 2001: Hristos Meletoglou
- 2002: Konstadinos Zalagitis
- 2003: Hristos Meletoglou
- 2004: Hristos Meletoglou
- 2005: Konstadinos Zalagitis
- 2006: Konstadinos Zalagitis

=== Shot put ===
- 1983: Loukas Louka (CYP)
- 1984: Vassilios Manganas
- 1985: Dimitrios Koutsoukis
- 1986: Dimitrios Koutsoukis
- 1987: Dimitrios Koutsoukis
- 1988: Dimitrios Koutsoukis
- 1989: ?
- 1990: Mikhalis Louka (CYP)
- 1991: Dimitrios Koutsoukis
- 1992: Dimitrios Koutsoukis
- 1993: Ilias Louka (CYP)
- 1994: Kostas Kollias
- 1995: Kostas Kollias
- 1996: Ilias Louka (CYP)
- 1997: Alexandros Leonidis
- 1998: Vaios Tigas
- 1999: Mikhalis Louka (CYP)
- 2000: Vaios Tigas
- 2001: Vaios Tigas
- 2002: Vaios Tigas
- 2003: Panagiotis Baharidis
- 2004: Michalis Stamatogiannis
- 2005: Andreas Anastasopoulos
- 2006: Andreas Anastasopoulos

=== Discus throw ===
- 1983: Kostas Georgakopoulos
- 1984: Kostas Georgakopoulos
- 1985: Kostas Georgakopoulos
- 1986: Kostas Georgakopoulos
- 1987: Kostas Georgakopoulos
- 1988: Kostas Georgakopoulos
- 1989: ?
- 1990: Kostas Georgakopoulos
- 1991: Angelos Nikolaidis
- 1992: Kostas Georgakopoulos
- 1993: Christos Papadopoulos
- 1994: Christos Papadopoulos
- 1995: Kostas Georgakopoulos
- 1996: Christos Papadopoulos
- 1997: ?
- 1998: Christos Papadopoulos
- 1999: Savvas Panavoglou
- 2000: Stefanos Konstas
- 2001: Savvas Panavoglou
- 2002: Stefanos Konstas
- 2003: Alexandros Ganotakis
- 2004: Stefanos Konstas
- 2005: Stefanos Konstas
- 2006: Stefanos Konstas

=== Hammer throw ===
- 1983: Ioannis Magos
- 1984: Panagiotis Kremastiotis
- 1985: Triantafillos Apastolidis
- 1986: Triantafillos Apastolidis
- 1987: Triantafillos Apastolidis
- 1988: Triantafillos Apastolidis
- 1989: ?
- 1990: Georgios Nalsatsiadis
- 1991: Savvas Saritzoglou
- 1992: Savvas Saritzoglou
- 1993: Savvas Saritzoglou
- 1994: Alexandros Papadimitriou
- 1995: Alexandros Papadimitriou
- 1996: Alexandros Papadimitriou
- 1997: Alexandros Papadimitriou
- 1998: Hristos Polihroniou
- 1999: Hristos Polihroniou
- 2000: Alexandros Papadimitriou
- 2001: Hristos Polihroniou
- 2002: Alexandros Papadimitriou
- 2003: Alexandros Papadimitriou
- 2004: Alexandros Papadimitriou
- 2005: Alexandros Papadimitriou
- 2006: Alexandros Papadimitriou

=== Javelin throw ===
- 1983: Ioannis Peristeris
- 1984: Antonios Papadimitriou
- 1985: Antonios Papadimitriou
- 1986: Antonios Papadimitriou
- 1987: Ioannis Peristeris
- 1988: Ioannis Peristeris
- 1989: Athanasios Peristeris
- 1990: Athanasios Peristeris
- 1991: Athanasios Peristeris
- 1992: Konstadinos Gatsioudis
- 1993: Konstadinos Gatsioudis
- 1994: Dimitrios Polymerou
- 1995: Dimitrios Polymerou
- 1996: Dimitrios Polymerou
- 1997: Dimitrios Polymerou
- 1998: Dimitrios Polymerou
- 1999: Konstadinos Gatsioudis
- 2000: Konstadinos Gatsioudis
- 2001: Konstadinos Gatsioudis
- 2002: Dimitrios Polymerou
- 2003: Georgios Iltsios
- 2004: Georgios Iltsios
- 2005: Eleutherios Karasmanakis
- 2006: Georgios Iltsios

=== Decathlon ===
- 1983: Ioannis Mavrikis
- 1984: Ioannis Mavrikis
- 1985: Athanasios Pampaliaris
- 1986: Athanasios Pampaliaris
- 1987: Athanasios Pampaliaris
- 1988: Athanasios Pampaliaris
- 1989: ?
- 1990: ?
- 1991: ?
- 1992: Savvas Stafilidis
- 1993: Savvas Stafilidis
- 1994: Michalis Simitzis
- 1995: Savvas Stafilidis
- 1996: Prodromos Korkizoglou
- 1997: Konstantinos Papadopoulos
- 1998: Prodromos Korkizoglou
- 1999: Prodromos Korkizoglou
- 2000: Yeorgios Andreou (CYP)
- 2001: Pavlos Kouromihalakis
- 2002: Prodromos Korkizoglou
- 2003: Prodromos Korkizoglou
- 2004: Efthimios Andreoglou
- 2005: Michalis Papaioannou
- 2006: Konstantinos Karamousalis

=== 20,000 metres walk ===
- 1985: Aris Karageorgios
- 1986: Christos Karageorgios
- 1987: Dimitrios Orfanopoulos
- 1988: Christos Karageorgios
- 1989: ?
- 1990: Christos Karageorgios
- 1991: ?
- 1992: Spyridon Kastanis
- 1993: Theodoros Stamatopoulos
- 1994: Spyridon Kastanis
- 1995: Dimitrios Orfanopoulos
- 1996: Not held
- 1997: Spyridon Kastanis
- 1998: Spyridon Kastanis

=== 20 kilometres walk ===
- 1984: Christos Karageorgios
- 1985: Not held
- 1986: Not held
- 1987: Not held
- 1988: Not held
- 1989: ?
- 1990: Not held
- 1991: ?
- 1992: Not held
- 1993: Not held
- 1994: Not held
- 1995: Not held
- 1996: Dimitrios Orfanopoulos
- 1997: Not held
- 1998: Not held
- 1999: Spyridon Kastanis
- 2000: Theodoros Stamatopoulos
- 2001: Theodoros Stamatopoulos
- 2002: Georgios Argiropoulos
- 2003: Theodoros Stamatopoulos
- 2004: Theodoros Stamatopoulos
- 2005: Theodoros Koupidis
- 2006: Theodoros Koupidis

=== 50 kilometres walk ===
- 1990: Spyridon Kastanis
- 1991: Spyridon Kastanis
- 1992: Dimitrios Orfanopoulos
- 1993: ?
- 1994: Spyridon Kastanis
- 1995: ?
- 1996: Spyridon Kastanis
- 1997: Andreas Stamatopoulos
- 1998: Spyridon Kastanis
- 1999: Spyridon Kastanis
- 2000: Spyridon Kastanis
- 2001: Spyridon Kastanis
- 2002: Spyridon Kastanis
- 2003: Georgios Argiropoulos
- 2004: Theodoros Stamatopoulos
- 2005: Konstantinos Stefanopoulos

== Women ==
=== 100 metres ===
- 1983: Zoe Michael (CYP)
- 1984: Georgia Drakopoulou
- 1985: Natasa Bardopoulou
- 1986: Marina Skordi
- 1987: Marina Skordi
- 1988: Voula Patoulidou
- 1989: ?
- 1990: Voula Patoulidou
- 1991: Marina Vasarmidou
- 1992: Voula Patoulidou
- 1993: Ekaterini Koffa
- 1994: Ekaterini Koffa
- 1995: Ekaterini Thanou
- 1996: Ekaterini Koffa
- 1997: Ekaterini Koffa
- 1998: Panayota Koutrouli
- 1999: Ekaterini Koffa
- 2000: Ekaterini Thanou
- 2001: Ekaterini Thanou
- 2002: Ekaterini Thanou
- 2003: Marina Vasarmidou
- 2004: Ekaterini Thanou
- 2005: Maria Karastamati
- 2006: Georgia Kokloni

=== 200 metres ===
- 1983: Alexandra Siouli
- 1984: Georgia Drakopoulou
- 1985: Natasa Bardopoulou
- 1986: Marina Skordi
- 1987: Marina Skordi
- 1988: Georgia Zouganeli
- 1989: ?
- 1990: Georgia Zouganeli
- 1991: Marina Vasarmidou
- 1992: Ekaterini Koffa
- 1993: Ekaterini Koffa
- 1994: Efrosini Patsou
- 1995: Ekaterini Koffa
- 1996: Ekaterini Koffa
- 1997: Marina Vasarmidou
- 1998: Dora Kyriakou (CYP)
- 1999: Ekaterini Koffa
- 2000: Ekaterini Koffa
- 2001: Olga Kaidantzi
- 2002: Olga Kaidantzi
- 2003: Olga Kaidantzi
- 2004: Olga Kaidantzi
- 2005: Eleni Artymata (CYP)
- 2006: Eleni Artymata (CYP)

=== 400 metres ===
- 1983: Melina Menelaou (CYP)
- 1984: Artemis Vassilakopoulou
- 1985: Artemis Vassilakopoulou
- 1986: Artemis Vassilakopoulou
- 1987: Chionati Kapeti
- 1988: Natasa Bardopoulou
- 1989: ?
- 1990: Sofia Mavromati
- 1991: Eleni Papadopoulos
- 1992: Marina Vasarmidou
- 1993: Dora Kyriakou (CYP)
- 1994: Ekaterini Galliti
- 1995: Ekaterini Galliti
- 1996: Dora Kyriakou (CYP)
- 1997: Dora Kyriakou (CYP)
- 1998: Dora Kyriakou (CYP)
- 1999: Christina Panagou
- 2000: Marina Vasarmidou
- 2001: Christina Panagou
- 2002: Chrysoula Goudenoudi
- 2003: Chrysoula Goudenoudi
- 2004: Chrysoula Goudenoudi
- 2005: Dimitra Dova
- 2006: Dimitra Dova

=== 800 metres ===
- 1983: Stavroula Konstantidinou
- 1984: Klaudia Tsakelidou
- 1985: Georgia Troumbouki
- 1986: Irini Theodoridou
- 1987: Irini Theodoridou
- 1988: Georgia Troumbouki
- 1989: ?
- 1990: Karolina Skourti
- 1991: Irini Theodoridou
- 1992: Paulina Evro
- 1993: Vassiliki Vraka
- 1994: Irini Akrivou
- 1995: Karolina Skourti
- 1996: Theoni Kostopolou
- 1997: Theoni Kostopolou
- 1998: Karolina Skourti
- 1999: Konstantina Liapikou
- 2000: Ekaterini Koutala
- 2001: Anastasia Mylona
- 2002: Anna Christofidou (CYP)
- 2003: Anna Christofidou (CYP)
- 2004: Eleni Filandra
- 2005: Eleni Filandra
- 2006: Eleni Filandra

=== 1500 metres ===
- 1983: Stavroula Konstantidinou
- 1984: Aspasia Potou
- 1985: Georgia Troumbouki
- 1986: Irini Theodoridou
- 1987: Irini Theodoridou
- 1988: Dimitra Anagnostou
- 1989: ?
- 1990: Irini Theodoridou
- 1991: Irini Theodoridou
- 1992: Paulina Evro
- 1993: Theoni Kostopolou
- 1994: Irini Akrivou
- 1995: Maria Protopappa
- 1996: Irini Akrivou
- 1997: Karolina Skourti
- 1998: Karolina Skourti
- 1999: Chrysostomia Iakovou
- 2000: Maria Tsirba
- 2001: Karolina Skourti
- 2002: Maria Tsirba
- 2003: Konstantina Efentaki
- 2004: Konstantina Efentaki
- 2005: Konstantina Efentaki
- 2006: Maria Dalaka

=== 3000 metres ===
- 1983: Ekaterini Dori
- 1984: Ekaterini Dori
- 1985: Dimitra Papaspyrou
- 1986: Not held
- 1987: Dimitra Papaspyrou
- 1988: Dimitra Anagnostou
- 1989: ?
- 1990: Georgia Tsafou
- 1991: Georgia Ambatzidou
- 1992: Andri Avraam (CYP)
- 1993: Maria Polyzou
- 1994: Chrysostomia Iakovou
- 1995: Not held
- 1996: Maria Polyzou

=== 5000 metres ===
- 1986: Dimitra Papaspyrou
- 1987: Not held
- 1988: Not held
- 1989: Not held
- 1990: Not held
- 1991: Not held
- 1992: Not held
- 1993: Not held
- 1994: Not held
- 1995: Chrysostomia Iakovou
- 1996: Maria Polyzou
- 1997: Chrysostomia Iakovou
- 1998: Spyridoula Souma
- 1999: Chrysostomia Iakovou
- 2000: Maria Polyzou
- 2001: Chrysostomia Iakovou
- 2002: Maria Protopappa
- 2003: Maria Protopappa
- 2004: Maria Protopappa
- 2005: Maria Protopappa
- 2006: Kalliopi Astropekaki

=== 10,000 metres ===
- 1988: Dimitra Papaspyrou
- 1989: ?
- 1990: Dimitra Papaspyrou
- 1991: Dimitra Anagnostou
- 1992: Dimitra Anagnostou
- 1993: Chrysostomia Iakovou
- 1994: Georgia Ambatzidou
- 1995: Olga Tektonidou-Parlyuk
- 1996: Not held
- 1997: Georgia Ambatzidou
- 1998: Spyridoula Souma
- 1999: Spyridoula Souma
- 2000: Georgia Ambatzidou
- 2001: Spyridoula Souma
- 2002: Georgia Ambatzidou
- 2003: Georgia Ambatzidou
- 2004: Georgia Ambatzidou
- 2005: Ekaterini Asimakopoulou
- 2006: Ekaterini Asimakopoulou

=== Marathon ===
- 1982: Alexandra Fili
- 1983: Despina Sfakianaki
- 1984: Georgia Papanastasiou
- 1985: Georgia Papanastasiou
- 1986: Georgia Papanastasiou
- 1987: Magda Poulimenou
- 1988: Maria Polyzou
- 1989: Maria Polyzou
- 1990: Sofia Sotiriadou
- 1991: Sofia Sotiriadou
- 1992: Paraskevi Kastriti
- 1993: Panayota Petropoulou
- 1994: Maria Polyzou
- 1995: Panayota Nikolakopoulou
- 1996: Panayota Nikolakopoulou
- 1997: Panayota Nikolakopoulou
- 1998: Panayota Nikolakopoulou
- 1999: Panayota Nikolakopoulou
- 2000: Vassiliki Sikopeti
- 2001: Georgia Ambatzidou
- 2002: Georgia Ambatzidou
- 2003: Georgia Ambatzidou
- 2004: Georgia Ambatzidou
- 2005: Georgia Ambatzidou

=== 3000 metres steeplechase ===
- 2001: Konstantina Efentaki
- 2002: Eleni Bikaki
- 2003: Pagona Sakellari
- 2004: Konstantina Kefala
- 2005: Maria Pardalou
- 2006: Irini Kokinariou

=== 100 metres hurdles ===
- 1983: Elissavet Pantazi
- 1984: Chionati Kapeti
- 1985: ?
- 1986: Elissavet Pantazi
- 1987: Elissavet Pantazi
- 1988: Angeliki Stogiannoudi
- 1989: Voula Patoulidou
- 1990: ?
- 1991: Angeliki Stogiannoudi
- 1992: Voula Patoulidou
- 1993: Hristiana Tabaki
- 1994: Maria Zaharia
- 1995: Angeliki Stogiannoudi
- 1996: Hristiana Tabaki
- 1997: Hristiana Tabaki
- 1998: Flora Redoumi
- 1999: Hristiana Tabaki
- 2000: Hristiana Tabaki
- 2001: Flora Redoumi
- 2002: Hristiana Tabaki
- 2003: Hristiana Tabaki
- 2004: Flora Redoumi
- 2005: Flora Redoumi
- 2006: Alexandra Komnou

=== 400 metres hurdles ===
- 1983: Andri Avraam (CYP)
- 1984: Chrisanthi Girousi
- 1985: ?
- 1986: Chionati Kapeti
- 1987: Chionati Kapeti
- 1988: Anna Rodakou
- 1989: ?
- 1990: Chionati Kapeti
- 1991: Chionati Kapeti
- 1992: Irini Sina
- 1993: Anna Pabori
- 1994: Marina Vasarmidou
- 1995: Maria Pachatouridou
- 1996: Maria Pachatouridou
- 1997: Christina Panagou
- 1998: Fani Chalkia
- 1999: Chrysoula Goudenoudi
- 2000: Chrysoula Goudenoudi
- 2001: Eleni Kalogerou
- 2002: Christina Chatzi
- 2003: Chrysoula Goudenoudi
- 2004: Fani Chalkia
- 2005: Christina Chatzi-Neag
- 2006: Christina Chatzi-Neag

=== High jump ===
- 1983: Eleni Victoros (CYP)
- 1984: Niki Gavera
- 1985: Niki Bakoyianni
- 1986: Niki Gavera
- 1987: Niki Bakoyianni
- 1988: Niki Bakoyianni
- 1989: Niki Bakoyianni
- 1990: Niki Gavera
- 1991: Niki Bakoyianni
- 1992: Niki Bakoyianni
- 1993: Niki Bakoyianni
- 1994: Vassiliki Xenou
- 1995: Niki Bakoyianni
- 1996: Niki Bakoyianni
- 1997: Vassiliki Xenou
- 1998: Niki Bakoyianni
- 1999: Agni Charalambous (CYP)
- 2000: Maria Chotokouridou
- 2001: Agni Charalambous (CYP)
- 2002: Maria Chotokouridou
- 2003: Nikolia Mitropoulou
- 2004: Nikolia Mitropoulou
- 2005: Maria Papageorgiou
- 2006: Persefoni Hatzinakou

=== Pole vault ===
- 1995: Yeoryia Tsiliggiri
- 1996: Paraskevi Koumbou
- 1997: Yeoryia Tsiliggiri
- 1998: Yeoryia Tsiliggiri
- 1999: Thalia Iakovidou
- 2000: Yeoryia Tsiliggiri
- 2001: Yeoryia Tsiliggiri
- 2002: Yeoryia Tsiliggiri
- 2003: Anna Fitídou (CYP)
- 2004: Yeoryia Tsiliggiri
- 2005: Afroditi Skafida
- 2006: Antigoni Asteriou

=== Long jump ===
- 1983: Kyriaki Giannakidou
- 1984: Sofia Mavromati
- 1985: Anna Karamanli
- 1986: Voula Patoulidou
- 1987: Agni Georgiou
- 1988: Sylvia Kanakari
- 1989: ?
- 1990: Panayota Bisbiki
- 1991: Athina Papadopoulou
- 1992: Niki Xanthou
- 1993: Eleni Karabesini
- 1994: Voula Patoulidou
- 1995: Niki Xanthou
- 1996: Eleni Karampesini
- 1997: Niki Xanthou
- 1998: Paraskevi Tsiamita
- 1999: Niki Xanthou
- 2000: Christina Athanasiou
- 2001: Stiliani Pilatou
- 2002: Stiliani Pilatou
- 2003: Niki Xanthou
- 2004: Ioanna Kafetzi
- 2005: Ioanna Kafetzi
- 2006: Hrysopiyi Devetzi

=== Triple jump ===
- 1992: Olympia Menelaou (CYP)
- 1993: Olga Vasdeki
- 1994: Efi Chatzi
- 1995: Olga Vasdeki
- 1996: Olga Vasdeki
- 1997: Sofia Bakatsaki
- 1998: Olga Vasdeki
- 1999: Paraskevi Tsiamita
- 2000: Ioanna Kafetzi
- 2001: Ioanna Kafetzi
- 2002: Hrysopiyi Devetzi
- 2003: Hrysopiyi Devetzi
- 2004: Hrysopiyi Devetzi
- 2005: Hrysopiyi Devetzi
- 2006: Hrysopiyi Devetzi

=== Shot put ===
- 1983: Soultana Saroudi
- 1984: Soultana Saroudi
- 1985: Soultana Saroudi
- 1986: Eleni Tsentemeidou
- 1987: Froso Vage
- 1988: Anna Verouli
- 1989: ?
- 1990: Eleni Tsentemeidou
- 1991: Eleni Tsentemeidou
- 1992: Elli Evangelidou (CYP)
- 1993: Kalliopi Ouzouni
- 1994: Kalliopi Ouzouni
- 1995: Fotini Kyriakidou
- 1996: Kalliopi Ouzouni
- 1997: Eleni Tsentemeidou
- 1998: Eleni Tsentemeidou
- 1999: Kalliopi Ouzouni
- 2000: Kalliopi Ouzouni
- 2001: Kalliopi Ouzouni
- 2002: Kalliopi Ouzouni
- 2003: Irini Terzoglou
- 2004: Kalliopi Ouzouni
- 2005: Stiliani Papadopoulou
- 2006: Irini Terzoglou

=== Discus throw ===
- 1983: Vassiliki Panayotopoulou
- 1984: Vassiliki Panayotopoulou
- 1985: Georgia Giannakidou
- 1986: Georgia Giannakidou
- 1987: Georgia Giannakidou
- 1988: Magda Karava
- 1989: ?
- 1990: Ekaterini Voggoli
- 1991: Anastasia Kelesidou
- 1992: Styliani Tsikouna
- 1993: Anastasia Kelesidou
- 1994: Anastasia Kelesidou
- 1995: Anastasia Kelesidou
- 1996: Anastasia Kelesidou
- 1997: Anastasia Kelesidou
- 1998: Ekaterini Voggoli
- 1999: Anastasia Kelesidou
- 2000: Anastasia Kelesidou
- 2001: Ekaterini Voggoli
- 2002: Anastasia Kelesidou
- 2003: Ekaterini Voggoli
- 2004: Ekaterini Voggoli
- 2005: Areti Abatzi
- 2006: Areti Abatzi

=== Hammer throw ===
- 1995: Asimina Morfi
- 1996: Asimina Morfi
- 1997: Asimina Morfi
- 1998: Asimina Morfi
- 1999: Asimina Morfi
- 2000: Evdokia Tsamoglou
- 2001: Alexandra Papageorgiou
- 2002: Alexandra Papageorgiou
- 2003: Alexandra Papageorgiou
- 2004: Alexandra Papageorgiou
- 2005: Stiliani Papadopoulou
- 2006: Alexandra Papageorgiou

=== Javelin throw ===
- 1983: Sofia Sakorafa
- 1984: Anna Verouli
- 1985: Eva Tatarkioti
- 1986: Anna Verouli
- 1987: Anna Verouli
- 1988: Anna Verouli
- 1989: ?
- 1990: Anna Verouli
- 1991: Efi Karatopouzi
- 1992: Anna Verouli
- 1993: Antigoni Vourdouli
- 1994: Dimitra Sargioti
- 1995: Efi Karatopouzi
- 1996: Efi Karatopouzi
- 1997: Anna Koussoulou
- 1998: Anna Koussoulou
- 1999: Mirela Maniani
- 2000: Aggeliki Tsiolakoudi
- 2001: Mirela Maniani
- 2002: Aggeliki Tsiolakoudi
- 2003: Savva Lika
- 2004: Savva Lika
- 2005: Mirela Maniani
- 2006: Savva Lika

=== Heptathlon ===
- 1983: Elissavet Pantazi
- 1984: Despina Pakou
- 1985: ?
- 1986: ?
- 1987: Kornelia Nikopoulou
- 1988: Alexandra Kourli
- 1989: ?
- 1990: ?
- 1991: ?
- 1992: Alexandra Kourli
- 1993: Alexandra Kourli
- 1994: Athina Papasotiriou
- 1995: Athina Papasotiriou
- 1996: Athina Papasotiriou
- 1997: Asimina Vanakara
- 1998: Argyro Strataki
- 1999: Athina Papasotiriou
- 2000: Asimina Vanakara
- 2001: Anastasia Kivelidou
- 2002: Argyro Strataki
- 2003: Argyro Strataki
- 2004: Argyro Strataki
- 2005: Argyro Strataki
- 2006: Argyro Strataki

=== 5000 metres walk ===
- 1985: Konstantina Bornivelli

=== 10,000 metres walk ===
The 1996 championships was held as a road event.

- 1986: Konstantina Bornivelli
- 1987: Konstantina Bornivelli
- 1988: Kalliopi Gavalaki
- 1989: ?
- 1990: Kalliopi Gavalaki
- 1991: ?
- 1992: Kalliopi Gavalaki
- 1993: ?
- 1994: Christina Kokotou
- 1995: Christina Kokotou
- 1996: Christina Kokotou
- 1997: Christina Kokotou
- 1998: Christina Kokotou

=== 20 kilometres walk ===
- 1998: Christina Kokotou
- 1999: Christina Deskou
- 2000: Christina Deskou
- 2001: Athina Papayianni
- 2002: Athanasia Tsoumeleka
- 2003: Athanasia Tsoumeleka
- 2004: Maria Hatzipanayotidou
- 2005: Evangelia Xinou
- 2006: Alexia Triantafillou
