= 2000 European Cup Super League =

These are the full results of the 2000 European Cup Super League in athletics which was held on 15 and 16 July 2000 at the Gateshead International Stadium in Gateshead, United Kingdom.

== Team standings ==
Men
Pos.	Nation	Points
1	Great Britain	101.5
2	Germany	101
3	France	97
4	Italy	96.5
5	Russia	88.5
6	Greece	88.5
7	Sweden	75
8	Hungary	62

Women
Pos.	Nation	Points
1	Russia	124
2	Germany	111
3	France	87
4	Italy	79
5	Great Britain	78
6	Romania	72
7	Ukraine	71
8	Greece	56

== Men's results ==
=== 100 metres ===
15 July
Wind: +2.3 m/s

Rank	Name	Nationality	Time	Notes	Points
1	Darren Campbell	Great Britain	10.09		8
2	Roland Németh	Hungary	10.19		7
3	Andrea Colombo	Italy	10.23		6
4	Aleksandr Ryabov	Russia	10.31		5
5	Angelos Pavlakakis	Greece	10.36		4
6	Marc Blume	Germany	10.37		3
7	David Patros	France	10.44		2
8	Matias Ghansah	Sweden	10.52		1

=== 200 metres ===
16 July
Wind: 0.0 m/s

Rank	Name	Nationality	Time	Notes	Points
1	Christian Malcolm	Great Britain	20.45		8
2	Alessandro Cavallaro	Italy	20.48		7
3	Konstantinos Kenteris	Greece	20.48		6
4	Christophe Cheval	France	20.59		5
5	Miklós Gyulai	Hungary	20.97		4
6	Anton Galkin	Russia	21.14		3
7	Johan Engberg	Sweden	21.18		2
8	Mathias Mertens	Germany	21.22		1

=== 400 metres ===
15 July

Rank	Name	Nationality	Time	Notes	Points
1	Jamie Baulch	Great Britain	46.64		8
2	Alessandro Attene	Italy	46.71		7
3	Jimisola Laursen	Sweden	46.93		6
4	Andrey Semyonov	Russia	47.10		5
5	Anastasios Gousis	Greece	47.12		4
6	Bruno Wavelet	France	47.29		3
7	Zsolt Szeglet	Hungary	47.43		2
8	Lars Figura	Germany	47.90		1

=== 800 metres ===
16 July

Rank	Name	Nationality	Time	Notes	Points
1	Mehdi Baala	France	1:47.90		8
2	Nils Schumann	Germany	1:47.94		7
3	Balázs Korányi	Hungary	1:48.52		6
4	Andrea Longo	Italy	1:49.01		5
5	Alisdair Donaldson	Great Britain	1:49.17		4
6	Rizak Dirshe	Sweden	1:49.58		3
7	Panagiotis Stroubakos	Greece	1:49.81		2
8	Boris Kaveshnikov	Russia	1:50.24		1

=== 1500 metres ===
15 July

Rank	Name	Nationality	Time	Notes	Points
1	Mehdi Baala	France	3:41.75		8
2	John Mayock	Great Britain	3:42.32		7
3	Vyacheslav Shabunin	Russia	3:42.44		6
4	Panagiotis Stroubakos	Greece	3:42.95		5
5	Dirk Heinze	Germany	3:42.95		4
6	Andrea Abelli	Italy	3:45.79		3
7	Balázs Tölgyesi	Hungary	3:49.40		2
8	Patrik Johansson	Sweden	3:49.79		1

=== 3000 metres ===
16 July

Rank	Name	Nationality	Time	Notes	Points
1	Driss Maazouzi	France	7:58.7		8
2	Vyacheslav Shabunin	Russia	7:59.0		7
3	Anthony Whiteman	Great Britain	8:01.0		6
4	Jirka Arndt	Germany	8:02.2		5
5	Salvatore Vincenti	Italy	8:04.8		4
6	Erik Sjöqvist	Sweden	8:16.6		3
7	Antonis Papantonis	Greece	8:19.4		2
8	Balázs Csillag	Hungary	8:21.0		1

=== 5000 metres ===
15 July

Rank	Name	Nationality	Time	Notes	Points
1	Mustapha Essaïd	France	13:47.44		8
2	Dmitriy Maksimov	Russia	13:48.43		7
3	Sebastian Hallmann	Germany	13:49.95		6
4	Gennaro Di Napoli	Italy	13:51.34		5
5	Antonis Papantonis	Greece	14:01.01		4
6	Kris Bowditch	Great Britain	14:03.10		3
7	Claes Nyberg	Sweden	14:03.49		2
8	Imre Berkovics	Hungary	14:20.66		1

=== 110 metres hurdles ===
16 July
Wind: +1.4 m/s

Rank	Name	Nationality	Time	Notes	Points
1	Falk Balzer	Germany	13.52		8
2	Emiliano Pizzoli	Italy	13.54		7
3	Robert Kronberg	Sweden	13.67		6
4	Damien Greaves	Great Britain	13.80		5
5	Dimitrios Siatounis	Greece	14.08		4
	Jean-Marc Grava	France	DQ		0
	Yevgeniy Pechyonkin	Russia	DQ		0
	Levente Csillag	Hungary	DQ		0

=== 400 metres hurdles ===
15 July

Rank	Name	Nationality	Time	Notes	Points
1	Chris Rawlinson	Great Britain	48.84		8
2	Ruslan Mashchenko	Russia	49.19		7
3	Fabrizio Mori	Italy	49.98		6
4	Periklis Iakovakis	Greece	50.02		5
5	Tibor Bédi	Hungary	50.27		4
6	Jimmy Coco	France	50.71		3
7	Steffen Kolb	Germany	50.82		2
8	Magnus Norberg	Sweden	52.18		1

=== 3000 metres steeplechase ===
16 July

Rank	Name	Nationality	Time	Notes	Points
1	Bouabdallah Tahri	France	8:27.28		8
2	Damian Kallabis	Germany	8:29.16		7
3	Giuseppe Maffei	Italy	8:34.47		6
4	Georgios Giannelis	Greece	8:34.80		5
5	Vladimir Pronin	Russia	8:45.69		4
6	Henrik Skoog	Sweden	8:47.64		3
7	Stuart Stokes	Great Britain	8:53.90		2
8	Levente Timár	Hungary	9:07.19		2

=== 4 × 100 metres relay ===
15 July

Rank	Nation	Athletes	Time	Note	Points
1	Great Britain	Christian Malcolm, Darren Campbell, Marlon Devonish, Dwain Chambers	38.41		8
2	Greece	Georgios Theodoridis, Konstantinos Kenteris, Alexios Alexopoulos, Angelos Pavlakakis	38.67		7
3	Italy	Marco Torrieri, Alessandro Cavallaro, Maurizio Checcucci, Andrea Colombo	39.17		6
4	Hungary	Viktor Kovács, Laszlo Babaly, Roland Németh, Miklós Gyulai	39.37		5
5	France	Stéphane Cali, Issa-Aimé Nthépé, Frédéric Krantz, David Patros	39.40		4
6	Germany	Alexander Kosenkow, Marc Blume, Christian Schacht, Patrick Schneider	39.52		3
7	Sweden	Erik Whan, Matias Ghansah, Mikael Ahl, Johan Engberg	39.82		2
	Russia	Valeriy Kirdyashev, Sergey Bychkov, Aleksandr Ryabov, Sergey Slukin	DNF		0

=== 4 × 400 metres relay ===
16 July

Rank	Nation	Athletes	Time	Note	Points
1	France	Bruno Wavelet, Marc Foucan, Dimitri Demoniere, Marc Raquil	3:04.50		8
2	Great Britain	Richard Knowles, Sean Baldock, Chris Rawlinson, Jamie Baulch	3:05.24		7
3	Hungary	Zétény Dombi, Zsolt Szeglet, Attila Kilvinger, Tibor Bédi	3:05.88		6
4	Greece	Georgios Oikonomidis, Periklis Iakovakis, Stilianos Dimotsios, Anastasios Gousis	3:05.89		5
5	Italy	Alessandro Attene, Walter Pirovano, Marco Salvucci, Ashraf Saber	3:06.02		4
6	Sweden	Magnus Aare, Johan Lannefors, Jimisola Laursen, Johan Wissman	3:06.35		3
7	Germany	Benjamin Nietze, Klaus Ehrsperger, Ruwen Faller, Lars Figura	3:06.35		2
	Russia	Vladislav Shiryayev, Andrey Semyonov, Dmitry Kosov, Ruslan Mashchenko	3:06.35		0

=== High jump ===
15 July

Rank	Name	Nationality	Result	Notes	Points
1	Stefan Holm	Sweden	2.28		8
2	Wolfgang Kreißig	Germany	2.25		7
3	Sergey Klyugin	Russia	2.20		6
4	Lambros Papakostas	Germany	2.20		5
5	Mustapha Raifak	France	2.20		4
6	Ben Challenger	Great Britain	2.15		2.5
6	Ivan Bernasconi	Italy	2.15		2.5
	István Kovács	Hungary	NM		0

=== Pole vault ===
16 July

Rank	Name	Nationality	Result	Notes	Points
1	Yevgeniy Smiryagin	Russia	5.85		8
2	Tim Lobinger	Germany	5.75		7
3	Patrik Kristiansson	Sweden	5.70		6
4	Giuseppe Gibilisco	Italy	5.70		5
5	Romain Mesnil	France	5.60		4
6	Tim Thomas	Great Britain	5.10		3
7	Marios Evangelou	Greece	5.10		2
8	Márk Váczi	Hungary	4.70		1

=== Long jump ===
15 July

Rank	Name	Nationality	Result	Notes	Points
1	Vitaliy Shkurlatov	Russia	8.22		8
2	Kofi Amoah Prah	Germany	8.15w		7
3	Peter Häggström	Sweden	8.08w		6
4	Cheikh Tidiane Toure	France	7.96		5
5	Konstadinos Koukodimos	Greece	7.64		4
6	Milko Campus	Italy	7.62		3
7	Nathan Morgan	Great Britain	7.57		2
8	Tamás Margl	Hungary	7.51		1

=== Triple jump ===
16 July

Rank	Name	Nationality	#1	#2	#3	#4	Result	Notes	Points
1	Larry Achike	Great Britain	16.55w	16.91	17.31w	16.72	17.31w		8
2	Fabrizio Donato	Italy	16.55	17.17w	x	17.08w	17.17w		7
3	Stamatios Lenis	Germany	17.01	16.62	x	x	17.01		6
4	Christian Olsson	Sweden	16.47w	16.20	16.17	16.88w	16.88w		5
5	Hrvoje Verzi	Germany	15.34w	16.25w	16.75w	x	16.75w		4
6	Colomba Fofana	France	14.93	x	15.94	16.69w	16.69w		3
7	Sergey Kochkin	Russia	16.48	16.45w	x	r	16.48		2
8	Tibor Ordina	Hungary	15.66	15.96	15.61	15.46w	15.96		1

=== Shot put ===
15 July

Rank	Name	Nationality	#1	#2	#3	#4	Result	Notes	Points
1	Paolo Dal Soglio	Italy	19.46	19.99	x	19.76	19.99		8
2	Michael Mertens	Germany	19.71	19.70	19.32	x	19.71		7
3	Jimmy Nordin	Sweden	x	19.38	x	19.46	19.46		6
4	Szilárd Kiss	Hungary	18.37	18.83	x	x	18.83		5
5	Yves Niaré	France	18.16	18.76	x	18.38	18.76		4
6	Vaios Tigas	Greece	18.17	18.74	x	18.53	18.74		3
7	Sergey Lyakhov	Russia	18.02	x	18.61	18.62	18.62		2
8	Mark Edwards	Great Britain	17.18	17.59	x	x	17.59		1

=== Discus throw ===
16 July

Rank	Name	Nationality	#1	#2	#3	#4	Result	Notes	Points
1	Lars Riedel	Germany	61.84	x	63.30	61.29	63.30		8
2	Róbert Fazekas	Hungary	x	61.00	62.15	61.83	62.15		7
3	Vitaliy Sidorov	Russia	59.61	x	59.41	60.91	60.91		6
4	Robert Weir	Great Britain	58.92	x	60.78	59.46	60.78		5
5	Diego Fortuna	Italy	59.16	59.49	59.81	57.69	59.81		4
6	Mattias Borrman	Sweden	57.22	57.95	x	x	57.95		3
7	Jean-Claude Retel	France	56.62	57.10	x	56.20	57.10		2
8	Stefanos Konstas	Greece	56.59	55.41	55.29	55.75	56.59		1

=== Hammer throw ===
16 July

Rank	Name	Nationality	#1	#2	#3	#4	Result	Notes	Points
1	Christophe Épalle	France	76.45	78.51	76.95	77.70	78.51		8
2	Alexandros Papadimitriou	Greece	77.64	75.59	x	x	77.64		7
3	Karsten Kobs	Germany	77.18	x	x	77.55	77.55		6
4	Tibor Gécsek	Hungary	71.36	75.05	x	76.18	76.18		5
5	Sergey Kirmasov	Russia	74.24	75.23	76.16	75.73	76.16		4
6	Bengt Johansson	Sweden	73.19	x	72.93	72.98	73.19		3
7	Paul Head	Great Britain	57.61	67.75	67.00	67.33	67.75		2
	Loris Paoluzzi	Italy	x	x	x	x	NM		0

=== Javelin throw ===
16 July

Rank	Name	Nationality	#1	#2	#3	#4	Result	Notes	Points
1	Sergey Makarov	Russia	84.88	x	82.62	89.92	89.92		8
2	Kostas Gatsioudis	Greece	82.10	84.56	x	83.54	84.56		7
3	Boris Henry	Germany	82.83	x	81.03	x	82.83		6
4	Patrik Boden	Sweden	82.39	x	x	x	82.39		5
5	Mick Hill	Great Britain	75.41	80.24	x	78.14	80.24		4
6	Gergely Horváth	Hungary	69.10	72.82	73.45	76.22	76.22		3
7	Laurent Dorique	France	72.53	74.55	73.22	70.01	74.55		2
8	Armin Kerer	Italy	72.22	70.52	72.43	67.65	72.43		1

== Women's results ==
=== 100 metres ===
15 July
Wind: +2.9 m/s

Rank	Name	Nationality	Time	Notes	Points
1	Ekaterini Thanou	Greece	10.84		8
2	Christine Arron	France	11.02		7
3	Manuela Levorato	Italy	11.13		6
4	Andrea Philipp	Germany	11.15		5
5	Iryna Pukha	Ukraine	11.23		4
6	Marina Trandenkova	Russia	11.24		3
7	Marcia Richardson	Great Britain	11.47		2
8	Evelina Lisenco	Romania	11.67		1

=== 200 metres ===
16 July
Wind: -0.3 m/s

Rank	Name	Nationality	Time	Notes	Points
1	Muriel Hurtis	France	22.70		8
2	Natalya Voronova	Russia	22.81		7
3	Andrea Philipp	Germany	22.88		6
4	Manuela Levorato	Italy	22.89		5
5	Viktoriya Fomenko	Ukraine	23.03		4
6	Donna Fraser	Great Britain	23.14		3
7	Ekaterini Koffa	Greece	23.32		2
8	Evelina Lisenco	Romania	23.96		1

=== 400 metres ===
15 July

Rank	Name	Nationality	Time	Notes	Points
1	Svetlana Pospelova	Russia	50.63		8
2	Donna Fraser	Great Britain	51.78		7
3	Uta Rohländer	Germany	52.17		6
4	Virna De Angeli	Italy	52.85		5
5	Olena Rurak	Ukraine	53.04		4
6	Hrisa Goudenoudi	Greece	53.20		3
7	Otilia Ruicu	Romania	53.43		2
8	Marie-Louise Bévis	France	54.25		1

=== 800 metres ===
15 July

Rank	Name	Nationality	Time	Notes	Points
1	Irina Mistyukevich	Russia	2:02.52		8
2	Linda Kisabaka	Germany	2:03.88		7
3	Patricia Djaté	France	2:04.44		6
4	Tanya Blake	Great Britain	2:04.71		5
5	Patrizia Spuri	Italy	2:04.75		4
6	Simona Ionescu	Romania	2:06.24		3
7	Maryna Makarova	Ukraine	2:08.15		2
8	Ekaterini Koutala	Greece	2:09.76		1

=== 1500 metres ===
16 July

Rank	Name	Nationality	Time	Notes	Points
1	Helen Pattinson	Great Britain	4:12.05		8
2	Yelena Zadorozhnaya	Russia	4:12.20		7
3	Kristina da Fonseca	Germany	4:13.11		6
4	Fatima Yvelain	France	4:13.97		5
5	Oksana Meltsayeva	Ukraine	4:15.05		4
6	Elena Buhăianu	Romania	4:15.70		3
7	Maria Tsirba	Greece	4:18.90		2
8	Elisabetta Artuso	Italy	4:21.09		1

=== 3000 metres ===
15 July

Rank	Name	Nationality	Time	Notes	Points
1	Gabriela Szabo	Romania	8:43.33		8
2	Galina Bogomolova	Russia	8:43.45		7
3	Hayley Tullett	Great Britain	8:45.39		6
4	Luminita Zaituc	Germany	9:03.20		5
5	Maryna Dubrova	Ukraine	9:03.90		4
6	Silvia Sommaggio	Italy	9:06.75		3
7	Laurence Duquenoy	France	9:12.76		2
8	Maria Protopappa	Greece	9:21.68		1

=== 5000 metres ===
16 July

Rank	Name	Nationality	Time	Notes	Points
1	Tatyana Tomashova	Russia	14:53.00		8
2	Irina Mikitenko	Germany	14:54.30		7
3	Yamna Belkacem	France	14:57.05		6
4	Maura Viceconte	Italy	15:18.80		5
5	Elena Fidatov	Romania	15:25.42		4
6	Hayley Yelling	Great Britain	15:36.27		3
7	Tetyana Belovol	Ukraine	15:37.32		2
8	Maria Protopappa	Greece	16:12.24		1

=== 100 metres hurdles ===
16 July
Wind: +0.2 m/s

Rank	Name	Nationality	Time	Notes	Points
1	Linda Ferga	France	12.93		8
2	Maya Shemchishina	Ukraine	12.95		7
3	Yuliya Graudyn	Russia	13.08		6
4	Keri Maddox	Great Britain	13.15		5
5	Birgit Hamann	Germany	13.24		4
6	Viorica Țigău	Romania	13.36		3
7	Hristiana Tabaki	Greece	13.42		2
8	Margaret Macchiut	Italy	13.92		1

=== 400 metres hurdles ===
15 July

Rank	Name	Nationality	Time	Notes	Points
1	Tetyana Tereshchuk	Ukraine	54.68		8
2	Ulrike Urbansky	Germany	56.10		7
3	Monika Niederstätter	Italy	56.33		6
4	Keri Maddox	Great Britain	56.36		5
5	Corinne Tafflet	France	57.74		4
6	Yuliya Nosova	Russia	58.81		3
7	Hrisa Goudenoudi	Greece	1:00.02		2
8	Ana Maria Barbu	Romania	1:04.04		1

=== 4 × 100 metres relay ===
15 July

Rank	Nation	Athletes	Time	Note	Points
1	France	Katia Benth, Muriel Hurtis, Fabé Dia, Christine Arron	42.97		8
2	Russia	Marina Kislova, Marina Trandenkova, Natalya Voronova, Irina Khabarova	43.38		7
3	Germany	Sina Schielke, Esther Möller, Andrea Philipp, Marion Wagner	43.51		6
4	Greece	Paraskevi Patoulidou, Effrosini Patsou, Ekaterini Koffa, Ekaterini Thanou	43.76		5
5	Ukraine	Iryna Pukha, Anzhela Kravchenko, Oksana Guskova, Olena Pastushenko	43.89		4
6	Italy	Anita Pistone, Daniela Graglia, Manuela Grillo, Manuela Levorato	44.00		3
7	Romania	Monika Bumbescu, Viorica Tigau, Evelina Lisenco, Eva Miklos	44.42		2
	Great Britain	Marcia Richardson, Shani Anderson, Samantha Davies, Joice Maduaka	DQ		0

=== 4 × 400 metres relay ===
16 July

Rank	Nation	Athletes	Time	Note	Points
1	Russia	Olesya Zykina, Irina Rosikhina, Yekaterina Kulikova, Yuliya Sotnikova	3:25.50		8
2	Germany	Shanta Ghosh, Ulrike Urbansky, Birgit Rockmeier, Uta Rohländer	3:27.70		7
3	Great Britain	Natasha Danvers, Sinead Dudgeon, Allison Curbishley, Donna Fraser	3:28.12		6
4	Italy	Daniela Graglia, Patrizia Spuri, Francesca Carbone, Virna De Angeli	3:32.23		5
5	France	Marie-Louise Bévis, Vivian Dorsile, Lucie Rangassamy, Anita Mormand	3:33.16		4
6	Romania	Evelina Lisenco, Alina Ripanu, Andrea Burlacu, Otilia Ruicu	3:34.65		3
	Greece	Georgia Tsikouri, Marina Vasarmidou, Hristina Panagou, Hrisa Goudenoudi	DQ		0
	Ukraine	Tetyana Movchan, Tetyana Debela, Olga Mishchenko, Olena Rurak	DQ		0

=== High jump ===
16 July

Rank	Name	Nationality	1.70	1.75	1.80	1.83	1.86	1.89	1.91	1.93	1.98	Result	Notes	Points
1	Monica Dinescu	Romania	–	–	o	–	o	–	o	o	xxx	1.93		8
2	Yulia Lyakhova	Russia	–	o	o	o	o	o	xo	xxx		1.91		7
3	Jo Jennings-Steele	Great Britain	–	o	o	o	xo	xxx				1.86		6
4	Amewu Mensah	Germany	–	o	o	xo	xxx					1.83		5
5	Stefania Cadamuro	Italy	–	o	xo	xxo	xxx					1.83		4
6	Tetyana Nikolayeva	Ukraine	–	o	o	xxx						1.80		3
7	Marie Collonvillé	France	o	o	xo	xxx						1.80		2
8	Maria Hotokouridou	Greece	o	xo	xxx							1.75		1

=== Pole vault ===
15 July

Rank	Name	Nationality	3.80	3.90	4.00	4.10	4.20	4.25	4.30	4.35	4.40	Result	Notes	Points
1	Svetlana Feofanova	Russia	–	–	–	xo	–	o	–	xxo	xx	4.35		8
2	Yvonne Buschbaum	Germany	–	–	–	xo	–	–	xo	–	xxx	4.30		7
3	Francesca Dolcini	Italy	xo	–	xxo	o	xo	–	xxx			4.20		6
4	Janine Whitlock	Great Britain	–	xo	o	xo	xxx					4.10		5
5	Gabriela Mihalcea	Romania	xo	o	xo	xxo	xxx					4.10		4
6	Marie Poissonnier	France	o	–	o	xxx						4.00		3
7	Georgia Tsiliggiri	Greece	o	xxx								3.80		2
	Yevhenia Savina	Ukraine	xxx									NM		0

=== Long jump ===
16 July

Rank	Name	Nationality	#1	#2	#3	#4	Result	Notes	Points
1	Olga Rublyova	Russia	6.85	x	x	6.87	6.87		8
2	Olena Shekhovtsova	Ukraine	6.79	x	x	6.50	6.79		7
3	Fiona May	Italy	6.72	6.65	6.74w	6.47	6.74w		6
4	Susen Tiedtke	Germany	6.43	6.44	4.85	6.46	6.46		5
5	Hristina Athanasiou	Greece	x	x	6.29w	6.18	6.29w		4
6	Viorica Țigău	Romania	6.19w	6.00	x	x	6.19w		3
7	Jade Johnson	Great Britain	x	x	5.45	6.15	6.15		2
8	Marie Collonvillé	France	6.12w	5.96	–	x	6.12w		1

=== Triple jump ===
16 July

Rank	Name	Nationality	#1	#2	#3	#4	Result	Notes	Points
1	Tatyana Lebedeva	Russia	14.55	14.34	14.56	14.98	14.98	CR	8
2	Olena Govorova	Ukraine	x	x	14.17	14.31	14.31		7
3	Barbara Lah	Italy	x	13.86	x	13.81	13.86		6
4	Adelina Gavrila	Romania	13.84	13.85	13.76	13.30	13.85		5
5	Sandrine Domain	France	13.19	13.54	13.18	13.33	13.54		4
6	Nicole Herschmann	Germany	13.51	13.30	13.30	x	13.51		3
7	Michelle Griffith	Great Britain	13.50	12.57	13.50	12.68	13.50		2
8	Ioanna Kafetzi	Greece	13.16	13.40	x	x	13.40		1

=== Shot put ===
16 July

Rank	Name	Nationality	#1	#2	#3	#4	Result	Notes	Points
1	Astrid Kumbernuss	Germany	18.71	x	18.94	x	18.94		8
2	Kalliopi Ouzouni	Greece	17.05	17.86	17.68	18.16	18.16		7
3	Judith Oakes	Great Britain	17.87	18.08	17.60	x	18.08		6
4	Lucica Ciobanu	Romania	16.71	16.78	17.57	16.54	17.57		5
5	Laurence Manfredi	France	x	x	16.20	17.30	17.30		4
6	Olena Dementiy	Ukraine	16.36	15.77	16.65	15.94	16.65		3
7	Mara Rosolen	Italy	16.60	16.62	16.52	x	16.62		2
8	Lyudmila Sechko	Russia	x	15.75	16.42	x	16.42		1

=== Discus throw ===
15 July

Rank	Name	Nationality	#1	#2	#3	#4	Result	Notes	Points
1	Nicoleta Grasu	Romania	59.78	62.08	63.35	59.81	63.35		8
2	Ilke Wyludda	Germany	62.30	60.22	59.03	62.45	62.45		7
3	Anastasia Kelesidou	Greece	59.34	62.30	59.51	x	62.30		6
4	Olga Chernyavskaya	Russia	59.56	x	62.20	60.38	62.30		5
5	Melina Robert-Michon	France	50.96	57.48	57.74	x	57.74		4
6	Olena Antonova	Ukraine	57.69	55.99	x	53.35	57.69		3
7	Agnese Maffeis	Italy	50.00	50.84	50.86	52.98	52.98		2
8	Shelley Drew	Great Britain	x	52.21	x	52.74	52.74		1

=== Hammer throw ===
15 July

Rank	Name	Nationality	#1	#2	#3	#4	Result	Notes	Points
1	Olga Kuzenkova	Russia	66.54	x	70.20	x	70.20		8
2	Kirsten Munchow	Germany	x	61.90	68.31	61.91	68.31		7
3	Manuela Montebrun	France	64.32	67.45	67.73	67.18	67.73		6
4	Lorraine Shaw	Great Britain	64.39	63.29	67.44	64.21	67.44		5
5	Ester Balassini	Italy	65.13	61.43	x	58.71	65.13		4
6	Iryna Sekachova	Ukraine	60.79	64.08	62.56	64.44	64.44		3
7	Evdokia Tsamoglou	Greece	x	x	60.33	62.25	62.25		2
	Mihaela Melinte	Romania					DQ		0

=== Javelin throw ===
15 July

Rank	Name	Nationality	#1	#2	#3	#4	Result	Notes	Points
1	Ana Mirela Țermure	Romania	63.23	58.78	55.56	–	63.23		8
2	Tatyana Shikolenko	Russia	59.76	60.41	58.57	58.22	60.41		7
3	Mirela Tzelili	Greece	56.21	x	57.84	x	57.84		6
4	Claudia Coslovich	Italy	x	54.81	57.33	57.23	57.33		5
5	Nadine Auzeil	France	55.58	x	55.50	57.21	57.21		4
6	Karen Forkel	Germany	47.73	52.89	x	50.42	52.89		3
7	Olha Ivankova	Ukraine	x	50.43	51.58	49.00	51.58		2
8	Karen Martin	Great Britain	48.26	51.08	x	47.05	51.08		1
