= 2003 European Cup Super League =

These are the full results of the 2003 European Cup Super League which was held on 21 and 22 June 2003 at the Stadio Luigi Ridolfi in Florence, Italy.

== Final standings ==
Men
Pos.	Nation	Points
1	France	109
2	Germany	100.5
3	Great Britain	96
4	Russia	92
5	Italy	84
6	Poland	83
7	Spain	80
8	Greece	74.5

Women
Pos.	Nation	Points
1	Russia	130
2	Germany	103
3	France	102
4	Great Britain	83
5	Spain	82
6	Greece	78.5
7	Romania	77.5
8	Italy	62

== Men's results ==
=== 100 metres ===
21 June
Wind: -1.0 m/s

Rank	Name	Nationality	Time	Notes	Points
1	Mark Lewis-Francis	Great Britain	10.22		8
2	Aimé-Issa Nthépé	France	10.36		7
3	Aristotelis Gavelas	Greece	10.44		6
4	Francesco Scuderi	Italy	10.46		5
5	Marcin Urbaś	Italy	10.48		4
6	Andrey Yepishin	Russia	10.60		3
7	Ángel David Rodríguez	Spain	10.61		2
8	Marc Blume	Germany	10.64		1

=== 200 metres ===
22 June
Wind: -2.3 m/s

Rank	Name	Nationality	Time	Notes	Points
1	Konstadinos Kederis	Greece	20.37		8
2	Christian Malcolm	Great Britain	20.45		7
3	Marcin Jędrusiński	Poland	20.53		6
4	Alessandro Cavallaro	Italy	20.54		5
5	Leslie Djhone	France	20.68	SB	4
6	Ronny Ostwald	Germany	21.23		3
7	Anton Galkin	Russia	21.46		2
8	Santiago Ezquerro	Spain	21.66		1

=== 400 metres ===
21 June

Rank	Name	Nationality	Time	Notes	Points
1	Marc Raquil	France	44.88		8
2	Ingo Schultz	Germany	45.19		7
3	Iwan Thomas	Great Britain	45.58	SB	6
4	Dmitriy Forshev	Russia	45.62	PB	5
5	Rafał Wieruszewski	Poland	45.62	SB	4
6	David Canal	Spain	45.67		3
7	Stilianos Dimotsios	Greece	45.96		2
8	Andrea Barberi	Italy	46.43		1

=== 800 metres ===
22 June

Rank	Name	Nationality	Time	Notes	Points
1	Antonio Manuel Reina	Spain	1:48.13		8
2	Florent Lacasse	France	1:48.37		7
3	René Herms	Germany	1:49.15		6
4	Neil Speaight	Great Britain	1:49.18		5
5	Dmitry Bogdanov	Russia	1:49.23		4
6	Zbigniew Graczyk	Poland	1:49.60		3
7	Christian Neunhäuserer	Italy	1:49.89		2
8	Sotirios Papadeas	Greece	1:50.45		1

=== 1500 metres ===
22 June

Rank	Name	Nationality	Time	Notes	Points
1	Juan Carlos Higuero	Spain	3:49.16		8
2	Mirosław Formela	Poland	3:49.22		7
3	Michael East	Great Britain	3:49.60		6
4	Bouabdellah Tahri	France	3:49.67		5
5	Franek Haschke	Germany	3:49.85		4
6	Andrey Zadorozhniy	Russia	3:49.85		3
7	Christian Obrist	Italy	3:49.86		2
8	Konstadinos Karakatsanis	Greece	3:51.01		1

=== 3000 metres ===
22 June

Rank	Name	Nationality	Time	Notes	Points
1	Fouad Chouki	France	8:22.56	SB	8
2	Carlos Castillejo	Spain	8:22.79		7
3	Vyacheslav Shabunin	Russia	8:23.18		6
4	Lorenzo Perrone	Italy	8:23.29		5
5	John Mayock	Great Britain	8:24.18		4
6	Jan Fitschen	Germany	8:25.27		3
7	Jakub Czaja	Poland	8:30.32		2
8	Michalis Gelassakis	Greece	8:31.54		1

=== 5000 metres ===
21 June

Rank	Name	Nationality	Time	Notes	Points
1	Ismaïl Sghyr	France	13:43.70		8
2	Jesús España	Spain	13:44.68		7
3	Dieter Baumann	Germany	13:45.55		6
4	Andrew Graffin	Great Britain	13:48.99		5
5	Sergey Lukin	Russia	13:57.78		4
6	Panagiotis Papoulias	Greece	14:06.13		3
7	Marco Mazza	Italy	14:09.96		2
8	Michał Kaczmarek	Poland	14:39.11		1

=== 110 metres hurdles ===
22 June
Wind: -0.2 m/s

Rank	Name	Nationality	Time	Notes	Points
1	Ladji Doucouré	France	13.55		8
2	Mike Fenner	Germany	13.58		7
3	Andrea Giaconi	Italy	13.66		6
4	Dimitrios Pietris	Greece	13.68	SB	5
5	Andy Turner	Great Britain	13.71		4
6	Igor Peremota	Russia	13.77		3
7	Felipe Vivancos	Spain	13.87		2
8	Artur Kohutek	Poland	14.02		1

=== 400 metres hurdles ===
21 June

Rank	Name	Nationality	Time	Notes	Points
1	Chris Rawlinson	Great Britain	48.45		8
2	Periklis Iakovakis	Greece	49.23		7
3	Ruslan Mashchenko	Russia	49.43	SB	6
4	Christian Duma	Germany	49.68		5
5	Eduardo Iván Rodríguez	Spain	49.70		4
6	Fabrizio Mori	Italy	50.18	SB	3
7	Sébastien Maillard	France	50.82		2
8	Zenon Miśtak	Poland	51.14		1

=== 3000 metres ===
22 June

Rank	Name	Nationality	Time	Notes	Points
1	Pavel Potapovich	Russia	8:26.28		8
2	Radosław Popławski	Poland	8:29.70		7
3	Angelo Iannelli	Italy	8:30.40		6
4	Antonio David Jiménez	Spain	8:31.63		5
5	Gaël Pencreach	France	8:33.27		4
6	Ralf Aßmus	Germany	8:44.43		3
7	Stuart Stokes	Great Britain	8:47.09		2
8	Hristoforos Merousis	Greece	8:54.71	SB	1

=== 4 × 100 metres relay ===
21 June

Rank	Nation	Athletes	Time	Note	Points
1	Italy	Francesco Scuderi, Simone Collio, Massimiliano Donati, Alessandro Cavallaro	38.42	SB	8
2	Poland	Marcin Krzywański, Łukasz Chyła, Marcin Jędrusiński, Marcin Urbaś	38.45	SB	7
3	Great Britain	Christian Malcolm, Darren Campbell, Marlon Devonish, Julian Golding	38.60		6
4	France	Stéphane Cali, Issa-Aimé Nthépé, Frédéric Krantz, Jérôme Éyana	38.84		5
5	Germany	Ronny Ostwald, Marc Blume, Alexander Kosenkow, Tobias Unger	38.90		4
6	Russia	Andrey Yepishin, Aleksandr Ryabov, Aleksandr Smirnov, Roman Smirnov	39.30	SB	3
7	Spain	Alberto Dorrego, Ángel David Rodríguez, Diego Moisés Santos, Carlos Berlanga	39.47	SB	2
	Greece	Angelos Pavlakakis, Aristotelis Gavelas, Georgios Theodoridis, Konstadinos Kederis	DQ		0

=== 4 × 400 metres relay ===
22 June

Rank	Nation	Athletes	Time	Note	Points
1	Great Britain	Chris Rawlinson, Tim Benjamin, Jamie Baulch, Matt Elias	3:02.43		8
2	Greece	Stilianos Dimotsios, Anastasios Gousis, Dimitrios Tsomos, Periklis Iakovakis	3:02.69		7
3	Germany	Ingo Schultz, Sebastian Gatzka, Ruwen Faller, Bastian Swillims	3:02.83	SB	6
4	Spain	Eduardo Iván Rodríguez, David Canal, Salvador Rodríguez, Antonio Manuel Reina	3:02.85		5
5	France	Ahmed Douhou, Leslie Djhone, Nicolas Lefebvre, Ibrahim Wade	3:03.06		4
6	Russia	Aleksandr Usov, Andrey Semenov, Dmitry Forshev, Yuriy Borzakovskiy	3:03.40	SB	3
7	Poland	Artur Walenczak, Artur Gąsiewski, Piotr Rysiukiewicz, Rafał Wieruszewski	3:03.69		2
8	Italy	Andrea Barberi, Luca Galletti, Marco Salvucci, Jens Yao Amanfu	3:04.93	SB	1

=== High jump ===
21 June

Rank	Name	Nationality	2.10	2.15	2.20	2.24	2.27	2.30	2.32	2.34	2.36	Result	Notes	Points
1	Yaroslav Rybakov	Russia	–	–	o	o	o	xo	o	xxo	xxx	2.34	SB	8
2	Alessandro Talotti	Italy	–	o	o	xo	o	o	x–	xx		2.30	PB	7
3	Grzegorz Sposób	Poland	–	o	o	o	o	xxx				2.27		6
4	Grégory Gabella	France	o	o	xxo	xxo	xxo	xxx				2.27	=SB	5
5	Dimitrios Kokotis	Greece	o	–	o	xxx						2.20	SB	3.5
5	Roman Fricke	Germany	o	o	o	xxx						2.20		3.5
7	Javier Bermejo	Spain	xo	o	o	xxx						2.20		2
8	Ben Challenger	Great Britain	–	o	xo	xxx						2.20		1

=== Pole vault ===
22 June

Rank	Name	Nationality	5.00	5.20	5.30	5.40	5.45	5.50	5.55	5.60	5.65	5.70	5.75	5.80	5.90	Result	Notes	Points
1	Romain Mesnil	France	–	–	–	–	–	o	–	–	o	–	o	–	xxx	5.75		8
2	Giuseppe Gibilisco	Italy	–	–	–	xo	–	–	–	o	–	xo	–	xxx		5.70		7
3	Lars Börgeling	Germany	–	–	–	–	xo	–	–	–	x–	xo	xxx			5.70		6
4	Adam Kolasa	Poland	–	o	–	o	–	xo	–	xxo	–	xxo	xxx			5.70	SB	5
5	Nick Buckfield	Great Britain	–	–	o	–	–	o	–	xxo	–	–	xxx			5.60		4
6	Artyom Kuptsov	Russia	–	–	o	–	–	o	–	xxx						5.50		3
7	Stavros Kouroupakis	Greece	–	xo	–	xx–	o	x–	xx							5.45	SB	2
8	Montxu Miranda	Spain	o	xxx												5.00		1

=== Long jump ===
21 June

Rank	Name	Nationality	#1	#2	#3	#4	Result	Notes	Points
1	Louis Tsatoumas	Greece	7.64	7.65	x	8.06	8.06		8
2	Yago Lamela	Spain	x	x	x	7.96	7.96		7
3	Nils Winter	Germany	7.53	7.68	7.71	7.85	7.85		6
4	Kader Klouchi	France	7.84	x	x	x	7.84		5
5	Chris Tomlinson	Great Britain	7.22	x	7.59	7.65	7.65		4
6	Kirill Sosunov	Russia	7.49	7.55	7.63	7.55	7.63		3
7	Nicola Trentin	Italy	x	7.39	7.52	7.61	7.61		2
8	Tomasz Mateusiak	Poland	x	7.54	x	x	7.54		1

=== Triple jump ===
22 June

Rank	Name	Nationality	#1	#2	#3	#4	Result	Notes	Points
1	Fabrizio Donato	Italy	16.62	17.16	x	x	17.16	SB	8
2	Julien Kapek	France	16.59	x	16.45	x	16.59		7
3	Hristos Meletoglou	Greece	16.52	x	x	15.99	16.52		6
4	Tosin Oke	Great Britain	x	16.10	16.21	16.45	16.45		5
5	Rudolph Helpling	Germany	15.64	x	15.86	16.26	16.26		4
6	Denis Kapustin	Russia	15.52	16.12	x	x	16.12		3
7	Jacek Kazimierowski	Poland	x	16.06	x	x	16.06		2
8	Raúl Chapado	Spain	15.43	x	15.76	15.96	15.96		1

=== Shot put ===
21 June

Rank	Name	Nationality	#1	#2	#3	#4	Result	Notes	Points
1	Manuel Martínez	Spain	19.66	21.08	20.89	20.70	21.08	SB	8
2	Carl Myerscough	Great Britain	20.35	x	x	20.72	20.72		7
3	Pavel Chumachenko	Russia	19.83	19.73	20.12	x	20.12		6
4	Tomasz Majewski	Poland	18.94	19.70	20.04	20.09	20.09	SB	5
5	Ralf Bartels	Germany	18.49	19.24	19.46	18.93	19.46		4
6	Paolo Dal Soglio	Italy	x	19.15	x	x	19.15		3
7	Panagiotis Baharidis	Greece	18.63	18.27	x	18.11	18.63		2
8	Yves Niaré	France	16.53	17.68	18.48	x	18.48		1

=== Discus throw ===
22 June

Rank	Name	Nationality	#1	#2	#3	#4	Result	Notes	Points
1	Dmitriy Shevchenko	Russia	61.09	65.27	65.39	x	65.39	SB	8
2	Michael Möllenbeck	Germany	64.86	63.37	x	65.26	65.26		7
3	Andrzej Krawczyk	Poland	x	61.27	58.59	59.42	61.27		6
4	Cristiano Andrei	Italy	59.83	61.03	59.82	60.94	61.03		5
5	Mario Pestano	Spain	58.68	59.37	60.52	x	60.52		4
6	Jean-Claude Retel	France	58.14	57.51	58.46	56.14	58.46		3
7	Carl Myerscough	Great Britain	57.65	x	55.63	x	57.65		2
8	Alexandros Ganotakis	Greece	x	55.44	x	–	55.44		1

=== Hammer throw ===
21 June

Rank	Name	Nationality	#1	#2	#3	#4	Result	Notes	Points
1	Karsten Kobs	Germany	79.22	80.63	80.42	79.82	80.63		8
2	Wojciech Kondratowicz	Poland	76.03	78.37	78.02	x	78.37		7
3	Alexandros Papadimitriou	Greece	78.11	x	x	x	78.11		6
4	Christophe Épalle	France	69.35	75.34	77.22	74.02	77.22		5
5	Nicola Vizzoni	Italy	72.17	x	72.23	74.75	74.75		4
6	Yuriy Voronkin	Russia	x	72.39	71.96	74.02	74.02		3
7	Moisés Campeny	Spain	72.73	73.83	x	x	73.83		2
8	Mick Jones	Great Britain	69.25	x	72.08	68.27	72.08		1

=== Javelin throw ===
22 June

Rank	Name	Nationality	#1	#2	#3	#4	Result	Notes	Points
1	Sergey Makarov	Russia	84.64	85.86	–	–	85.86		8
2	Christian Nicolay	Germany	80.73	81.93	80.88	81.18	81.93		7
3	Dariusz Trafas	Poland	78.10	77.95	x	79.36	79.36		6
4	Dominique Pausé	France	x	77.33	x	x	77.33		5
5	Georgios Iltsios	Greece	73.87	70.03	73.27	70.42	73.87		4
6	Mark Roberson	Great Britain	73.03	68.91	69.91	73.02	73.03		3
7	Francesco Pignata	Italy	66.51	66.11	65.04	67.28	67.28		2
8	Alejandro García	Spain	64.06	62.63	x	64.18	64.18		1

== Women's results ==
=== 100 metres ===
21 June
Wind: -1.3 m/s

Rank	Name	Nationality	Time	Notes	Points
1	Christine Arron	France	11.07		8
2	Marina Kislova	Russia	11.19		7
3	Glory Alozie	Spain	11.29	SB	6
4	Joice Maduaka	Great Britain	11.32		5
5	Esther Möller	Germany	11.58		4
6	Marina Vasarmidou	Greece	11.62		3
7	Erica Marchetti	Italy	11.81		2
8	Eveline Lisenco	Romania	14.99		1

=== 200 metres ===
22 June
Wind: -0.4 m/s

Rank	Name	Nationality	Time	Notes	Points
1	Anastasiya Kapachinskaya	Russia	22.71		8
2	Ionela Tîrlea	Romania	22.78	SB	7
3	Muriel Hurtis	France	22.89		6
4	Joice Maduaka	Great Britain	22.98		5
5	Birgit Rockmeier	Germany	23.48		4
6	Olga Kaidantzi	Greece	23.66		3
7	Daniela Graglia	Italy	23.71		2
8	Cristina Sanz	Spain	23.84		1

=== 400 metres ===
21 June

Rank	Name	Nationality	Time	Notes	Points
1	Svetlana Pospelova	Russia	50.85		8
2	Lee McConnell	Great Britain	51.37		7
3	Hrisa Goudenoudi	Greece	52.11	SB	6
4	Marie-Louise Bévis	France	52.35		5
5	Claudia Marx	Germany	52.45		4
6	Julia Alba	Spain	53.02	SB	3
7	Danielle Perpoli	Italy	53.19		2
8	Maria Rus	Romania	53.24		1

=== 800 metres ===
21 June

Rank	Name	Nationality	Time	Notes	Points
1	Claudia Gesell	Germany	2:00.85		8
2	Maria Cioncan	Romania	2:01.02		7
3	Mayte Martínez	Spain	2:01.63		6
4	Natalya Khrushchelyova	Russia	2:02.21		5
5	Virginie Fouquet	France	2:03.82		4
6	Susan Scott	Great Britain	2:04.28		3
7	Maria Papadopoulou	Greece	2:07.20		2
8	Elisabetta Artuso	Italy	2:11.41		1

=== 1500 metres ===
22 June

Rank	Name	Nationality	Time	Notes	Points
1	Natalia Rodríguez	Spain	4:07.18		8
2	Helen Clitheroe	Great Britain	4:08.18		7
3	Konstadina Efedaki	Greece	4:09.06	SB	6
4	Maria Cioncan	Romania	4:09.10		5
5	Yekaterina Rozenberg	Russia	4:10.45		4
6	Maria Martins	France	4:15.01		3
7	Angela Rinicella	Italy	4:17.68		2
8	Kathleen Friedrich	Germany	4:20.99		1

=== 3000 metres ===
21 June

Rank	Name	Nationality	Time	Notes	Points
1	Olga Yegorova	Russia	8:55.73		8
2	Hayley Tullett	Great Britain	8:57.45	SB	7
3	Sabrina Mockenhaupt	Germany	8:57.69		6
4	Mihaela Botezan	Romania	9:02.61	PB	5
5	Dori García	Spain	9:08.31	PB	4
6	Konstadina Efedaki	Greece	9:18.90		3
7	Laurence Duquenoy	France	9:22.54		2
8	Agata Balsamo	Italy	9:24.70		1

=== 5000 metres ===
22 June

Rank	Name	Nationality	Time	Notes	Points
1	Yelena Zadorozhnaya	Russia	15:34.07		8
2	Jo Pavey	Great Britain	15:35.31		7
3	Mihaela Botezan	Romania	15:39.63		6
4	Irina Mikitenko	Germany	15:45.92		5
5	Gloria Marconi	Italy	15:55.55	SB	4
6	Maria Protopappa	Greece	15:57.02		3
7	Rocío Ríos	Spain	16:01.79		2
8	Christelle Daunay	France	16:25.92		1

=== 100 metres hurdles ===
22 June
Wind: -0.1 m/s

Rank	Name	Nationality	Time	Notes	Points
1	Glory Alozie	Spain	12.86		8
2	Svetlana Laukhova	Russia	12.88	SB	7
3	Patricia Girard	France	12.95		6
4	Juliane Sprenger	Germany	13.08		5
5	Carmen Zamfir	Romania	13.21	SB	4
6	Hristiana Tabaki	Greece	13.22		3
7	Tasha Danvers	Great Britain	13.25		2
8	Margaret Macchiut	Italy	13.29		1

=== 400 metres hurdles ===
21 June

Rank	Name	Nationality	Time	Notes	Points
1	Ionela Tîrlea	Romania	54.47		8
2	Tasha Danvers	Great Britain	55.01		7
3	Heike Meißner	Germany	55.22	SB	6
4	Cora Olivero	Spain	55.93		5
5	Monika Niederstätter	Italy	56.26		4
6	Oksana Gulumyan-Yelyasova	Russia	56.46		3
7	Hrisa Goudenoudi	Greece	56.99		2
8	Sylvanie Morandais	France	57.22		1

=== 3000 metres steeplechase ===
22 June

Rank	Name	Nationality	Time	Notes	Points
1	Gulnara Samitova	Russia	9:40.89	CR	8
2	Cristina Casandra	Romania	9:48.47		7
3	Élodie Olivarès	France	9:54.51		6
4	Rosa María Morató	Spain	10:18.45		5
5	Tara Krzywicki	Great Britain	10:21.35	SB	4
6	Emma Quaglia	Italy	10:26.07		3
7	Katrina Engelen	Germany	10:40.90		2
8	Pagona Sakellari	Greece	11:11.34		1

=== 4 × 100 metres relay ===
21 June

Rank	Nation	Athletes	Time	Note	Points
1	France	Patricia Girard, Muriel Hurtis, Fabé Dia, Christine Arron	42.62		8
2	Germany	Melanie Paschke, Gabi Rockmeier, Esther Möller, Marion Wagner	43.13	SB	7
3	Russia	Olga Fedorova, Irina Khabarova, Marina Kislova, Larisa Kruglova	43.23		6
4	Greece	Georgia Kokloni, Marina Vasarmidou, Olga Kaidantzi, Ioanna Kafetzi	43.95		5
5	Spain	Carme Blay, Belén Recio, Cristina Sanz, Glory Alozie	43.95	SB	4
6	Great Britain	Susan Burnside, Amy Spencer, Jeanette Kwakye, Abi Oyepitan	43.99		3
7	Italy	Erica Marchetti, Daniela Graglia, Manuela Grillo, Vincenza Calì	44.21		2
	Romania	Maria Dragan, Livia Prutenau, Mirela Gavris, Carmen Zamfir	DQ		0

=== 4 × 400 metres relay ===
22 June

Rank	Nation	Athletes	Time	Note	Points
1	Russia	Natalya Lavshuk, Natalya Ivanova, Tatyana Firova, Svetlana Pospelova	3:26.02		8
2	Great Britain	Helen Karagounis, Katharine Merry, Catherine Murphy, Lee Mcconnell	3:26.52		7
3	France	Francine Landre, Dado Kamissoko, Solen Désert, Marie-Louise Bévis	3:28.39		6
4	Germany	Shanta Ghosh, Birgit Rockmeier, Nadine Balkow, Claudia Marx	3:28.81		5
5	Greece	Hariklia Bouda, Dimitra Dova, Georgia Koumnaki, Hrisa Goudenoudi	3:29.36		4
6	Romania	Mariana Florea, Alina Rîpanu, Maria Rus, Ionela Tîrlea	3:31.94		3
7	Italy	Maria Schutzmann, Patrizia Spuri, Monika Niederstätter, Virna De Angeli	3:32.19		2
8	Spain	Julia Alba, Cora Olivero, Norfalia Carabalí, Elena Corcoles	3:32.77		1

=== High jump ===
22 June

Rank	Name	Nationality	1.75	1.80	1.85	1.89	1.92	1.95	1.98	2.00	2.02	Result	Notes	Points
1	Daniela Rath	Germany	–	–	o	–	o	o	o	o	xxx	2.00	PB	8
2	Ruth Beitia	Spain	–	o	o	o	o	xo	xxx			1.95		7
3	Marina Kuptsova	Russia	–	o	o	o	xo	xxo	xxx			1.95		6
4	Gaëlle Niaré	France	o	o	o	o	o	xxx				1.92		5
5	Susan Jones	France	–	o	o	o	xxx					1.89	SB	4
6	Oana Pantelimon	Romania	–	xo	o	o	xxx					1.89		2.5
6	Nikolia Mitropoulou	Greece	o	xo	o	o	xxx					1.89	SB	2.5
8	Antonella Bevilacqua	Italy	o	o	o	xo	xxx					1.89		1

=== Pole vault ===
21 June

Rank	Name	Nationality	3.70	3.90	4.00	4.10	4.20	4.30	4.35	4.40	4.45	4.50	Result	Notes	Points
1	Annika Becker	Germany	–	–	–	–	o	–	–	o	–	xxo	4.50		8
2	Tatyana Polnova	Russia	–	–	–	–	o	xxo	o	o	xo	xxx	4.45		7
3	Marie Poissonnier	France	–	–	o	–	xo	o	o	xxx			4.35		6
4	Yeoryia Tsiliggiri	Greece	–	o	o	o	xo	o	–	xxx			4.30		5
5	Dana Cervantes	Spain	–	o	–	o	o	xxx					4.20		4
6	Tracy Bloomfield	Great Britain	o	xo	xo	xo	xxx						4.10		3
7	Arianna Farfalletti	Italy	–	o	o	xx–	x						4.00		2
		Romania											DNS		0

=== Long jump ===
22 June

Rank	Name	Nationality	#1	#2	#3	#4	Result	Notes	Points
1	Eunice Barber	France	6.59	6.72	6.55	6.76	6.76		8
2	Concepción Montaner	Spain	6.67	6.65	6.56	6.69	6.69	SB	7
3	Fiona May	Italy	6.67	6.42	6.17	6.37	6.67	SB	6
4	Lyudmila Galkina	Russia	6.56	6.34	x	6.36	6.56		5
5	Niki Xanthou	Greece	x	6.45	6.36	6.15	6.45		4
6	Jade Johnson	Great Britain	6.45	x	x	6.27	6.45		3
7	Bianca Kappler	Germany	6.23	6.13	x	6.17	6.23		2
8	Livia Pruteanu	Romania	5.90	x	6.09	6.04	6.09		1

=== Triple jump ===
21 June

Rank	Name	Nationality	#1	#2	#3	#4	Result	Notes	Points
1	Anna Pyatykh	Russia	x	14.40	14.79	14.27	14.79	AU23R	8
2	Magdelín Martínez	Italy	14.24	14.75	x	14.76	14.76		7
3	Adelina Gavrilă	Romania	x	14.00	14.45	x	14.45		6
4	Hrisopigi Devetzi	Greece	13.82	13.69	13.81	x	13.82		5
5	Carlota Castrejana	Spain	13.72	x	13.75	13.72	13.75		4
6	Katja Umlauft	Germany	x	13.02	x	x	13.02		3
7	Betty Lise	France	x	x	12.90	x	12.90		2
8	Rebecca White	Great Britain	x	x	12.70	x	12.70		1

=== Shot put ===
22 June

Rank	Name	Nationality	#1	#2	#3	#4	Result	Notes	Points
1	Astrid Kumbernuß	Germany	19.25	19.46	x	18.90	19.46		8
2	Svetlana Krivelyova	Russia	18.93	18.64	x	18.98	18.98		7
3	Laurence Manfrédi	France	17.71	x	17.87	17.97	17.97		6
4	Assunta Legnante	Italy	17.80	x	x	17.90	17.90		5
5	Irini Terzoglou	Greece	16.25	x	17.87	x	17.90		4
6	Elena Hila	Romania	17.01	17.04	17.74	17.74	17.74		3
7	Martina de la Puente	Spain	16.47	16.60	16.39	16.27	16.60		2
8	Kelly Sotherton	Great Britain	12.34	12.70	12.47	12.29	12.70		1

=== Discus throw ===
21 June

Rank	Name	Nationality	#1	#2	#3	#4	Result	Notes	Points
1	Ekaterini Voggoli	Greece	62.11	59.14	61.95	x	62.11		8
2	Mélina Robert-Michon	France	58.81	61.67	57.65	56.70	61.67		7
3	Natalya Sadova	Russia	x	56.18	60.93	61.59	61.59		6
4	Franka Dietzsch	Germany	57.88	60.67	x	x	60.67		5
5	Agnese Maffeis	Italy	56.23	57.72	57.82	55.07	57.82		4
6	Ileana Brindusoiu	Romania	57.78	56.28	55.79	x	57.78		3
7	Philippa Roles	Great Britain	56.64	56.52	x	x	56.64		2
8	Alice Matějková	Spain	53.01	x	53.91	x	53.91		1

=== Hammer throw ===
22 June

Rank	Name	Nationality	#1	#2	#3	#4	Result	Notes	Points
1	Manuela Montebrun	France	71.63	73.11	72.60	74.43	74.43		8
2	Mihaela Melinte	Romania	69.00	70.11	71.03	71.99	71.99	SB	7
3	Olga Kuzenkova	Russia	69.89	x	69.22	x	69.89		6
4	Ester Balassini	Italy	65.84	67.77	69.79	x	69.79		5
5	Susanne Keil	Germany	69.46	67.34	x	65.93	69.46		4
6	Lorraine Shaw	Great Britain	64.18	x	x	x	64.18		3
7	Alexandra Papageorgiou	Greece	x	63.19	x	x	63.19		2
8	Berta Castells	Spain	x	58.45	62.04	60.30	62.04		1

=== Javelin throw ===
21 June

Rank	Name	Nationality	#1	#2	#3	#4	Result	Notes	Points
1	Steffi Nerius	Germany	60.08	56.29	60.87	63.30	63.30		8
2	Mirela Manjani	Greece	x	55.82	62.89	63.13	63.13		7
3	Claudia Coslovich	Italy	62.70	58.43	57.83	58.98	62.70	SB	6
4	Valeriya Zabruskova	Russia	57.01	61.20	56.66	58.55	61.20		5
5	Sarah Walter	France	53.86	56.88	53.72	52.42	56.88		4
6	Mercedes Chilla	Spain	x	46.26	x	56.71	56.71		3
7	Goldie Sayers	Great Britain	46.53	51.88	53.84	55.28	55.28		2
8	Claudia Isăilă	Romania	53.61	x	x	x	53.61		1
