= 2001 European Cup Super League =

These are the full results of the 2001 European Cup Super League in athletics which was held on 23 and 24 June 2001 at the Weserstadion in Bremen, Germany.

== Team standings ==
Men
Pos	Country	Pts
1	Poland	107
2	Russia	97
3	Italy	94
4	Germany	93
5	Great Britain	91
6	France	87
7	Spain	77
8	Greece	67

Women
Pos	Country	Pts
1	Russia	126.5
2	Germany	117
3	France	86
4	Great Britain	82
5	Romania	78
6	Italy	72.5
7	Belarus	70
8	Czech Republic	47

== Men's results ==
=== 100 metres ===
23 June
Wind: +1.4 m/s

Rank	Lane	Name	Nationality	Time	Notes	Points
1	8	Mark Lewis-Francis	Great Britain	10.13		8
2	5	Konstantinos Kenteris	Greece	10.15		7
3	3	Frédéric Krantz	France	10.27		6
4	2	Marco Torrieri	Italy	10.29		5
5	7	Tim Göbel	Germany	10.35		4
6	1	Marcin Krzywański	Poland	10.42		3
7	4	Sergey Bychkov	Russia	10.46		2
8	6	Pedro Pablo Nolet	Spain	10.48		1

=== 200 metres ===
24 June
Wind: -0.7 m/s

Rank	Name	Nationality	Time	Notes	Points
1	Konstantinos Kenteris	Greece	20.31		8
2	Marlon Devonish	Great Britain	20.59		7
3	Marcin Urbaś	Poland	20.69		6
4	Christophe Cheval	France	20.82		5
5	Alessandro Cavallaro	Italy	20.84		4
6	Marc Blume	Germany	21.14		3
7	Aleksandr Ryabov	Russia	21.41		2
	Alberto Dorrego	Spain	DQ		0

=== 400 metres ===
23 June

Rank	Lane	Name	Nationality	Time	Notes	Points
1	5	Marc Raquil	France	44.95		8
2	3	Robert Maćkowiak	Poland	45.48		7
3	8	David Canal	Spain	45.52		6
4	1	Ingo Schultz	Germany	45.53		5
5	4	Alessandro Attene	Italy	45.92		4
6	6	Dmitriy Golovastov	Russia	46.11		3
7	2	Iwan Thomas	Great Britain	46.14		2
8	7	Anastasios Gousis	Greece	47.05		1

=== 800 metres ===
24 June

Rank	Name	Nationality	Time	Notes	Points
1	Paweł Czapiewski	Poland	1:48.28		8
2	Andrea Longo	Italy	1:48.54		7
3	Simon Lees	Great Britain	1:48.80		6
4	Dmitry Bogdanov	Russia	1:48.97		5
5	Jimmy Lomba	France	1:49.13		4
6	Tarik Bourrouag	Germany	1:49.36		3
7	Israel Domínguez	Spain	1:49.65		2
8	Pavlos Farouggias	Greece	1:50.06		1

=== 1500 metres ===
23 June

Rank	Name	Nationality	Time	Notes	Points
1	José Antonio Redolat	Spain	3:45.81		8
2	Mehdi Baala	France	3:46.29		7
3	Leszek Zblewski	Poland	3:47.06		6
4	Christian Obrist	Italy	3:47.69		5
5	Panagiotis Stroubakos	Greece	3:48.11		4
6	Tom Mayo	Great Britain	3:48.69		3
7	Andrey Zadorozhniy	Russia	3:48.81		2
8	Benjamin Hetzler	Germany	3:50.08		1

=== 3000 metres ===
24 June

Rank	Name	Nationality	Time	Notes	Points
1	Driss Maazouzi	France	7:52.26		8
2	Andrés Manuel Díaz	Spain	7:52.59		7
3	John Mayock	Great Britain	7:56.06		6
4	Wolfram Müller	Germany	7:56.16		5
5	Sergey Drygin	Russia	7:57.09		4
6	Leszek Zblewski	Poland	7:57.47		3
7	Ferdinando Vicari	Italy	7:58.49		2
8	Ioannis Neanidis	Greece	8:10.84		1

=== 5000 metres ===
23 June

Rank	Name	Nationality	Time	Notes	Points
1	Smail Sghir	France	13:50.47		8
2	Alberto García	Spain	13:50.96		7
3	Marco Mazza	Italy	13:55.85		6
4	Mike Openshaw	Great Britain	13:58.15		5
5	Jan Fitschen	Germany	13:58.69		4
6	Mikhayil Yeginov	Russia	14:00.24		3
7	Dariusz Kruczkowski	Poland	14:08.83		2
8	Anastasios Fraggos	Greece	14:33.38		1

=== 110 metres hurdles ===
24 June
Wind: +1.3 m/s

Rank	Name	Nationality	Time	Notes	Points
1	Evgeny Pechonkin	Russia	13.38		8
2	Florian Schwarthoff	Germany	13.57		7
3	Tony Jarrett	Great Britain	13.58		6
4	Emiliano Pizzoli	Italy	13.71		5
5	Krzysztof Mehlich	Poland	13.86		4
6	Hipolito Montesinos	Spain	13.88		3
7	Ladji Doucouré	France	14.02		2
8	Dimitrios Pietris	Greece	14.04		1

=== 400 metres hurdles ===
23 June

Rank	Lane	Name	Nationality	Time	Notes	Points
1	7	Fabrizio Mori	Italy	48.39		8
2	6	Marek Plawgo	Poland	48.98		7
3	8	Stéphane Diagana	France	49.07		6
4	1	Ruslan Mashchenko	Russia	49.53		5
5	5	Chris Rawlinson	Great Britain	50.11		4
6	2	Periklis Iakovakis	Greece	50.28		3
7	3	Eduardo Iván Rodríguez	Spain	50.44		2
8	4	Jan Reinberg	Germany	51.66		1

=== 3000 metres steeplechase ===
24 June

Rank	Name	Nationality	Time	Notes	Points
1	Bouabdellah Tahri	France	8:38.02		8
2	Antonio David Jiménez	Spain	8:38.09		7
3	Ralf Assmus	Germany	8:39.34		6
4	Roman Usov	Russia	8:41.08		5
5	Luciano Di Pardo	Italy	8:42.75		4
6	Jan Zakrzewski	Poland	8:44.79		3
7	Georgios-Vasilios Kobogiannis	Greece	8:47.81		2
8	Ben Whitby	Great Britain	8:50.13		1

=== 4 × 100 metres relay ===
23 June

Rank	Nation	Athletes	Time	Note	Points
1	Italy	Francesco Scuderi, Alessandro Cavallaro, Maurizio Checcucci, Andrea Colombo	38.89		8
2	Great Britain	Allyn Condon, Marlon Devonish, Christian Malcolm, Mark Lewis-Francis	38.99		7
3	Poland	Marcin Krzywański, Marcin Jędrusiński, Piotr Balcerzak, Marcin Urbaś	39.00		6
4	Germany	Tobias Unger, Marc Blume, Alexander Kosenkow, Christian Schacht	39.48		5
5	Spain	Cecilio Maestra, Pedro Pablo Nolet, Diego Moisés Santos, Carlos Berlanga	39.58		4
6	Greece	Panagiotis Sarris, Aristotelis Gavelas, Konstantinos Kenteris, Haralabos Papadias	39.62		3
7	Russia	Valeriy Kirdyashev, Aleksandr Ryabov, Aleksandr Smirnov, Sergey Bychkov	40.27		2
	France	Jérôme Éyana, Frédéric Krantz, Christophe Cheval, Needy Guims	40.27		2

=== 4 × 400 metres relay ===
24 June

Rank	Nation	Athletes	Time	Note	Points
1	Poland	Piotr Rysiukiewicz, Piotr Haczek, Piotr Długosielski, Robert Maćkowiak	3:01.79		8
2	Russia	Boris Gorban, Ruslan Mashchenko, Dmitriy Golovastov, Andrey Semyonov	3:02.09		7
3	Germany	Ingo Schultz, Michael Dragu, Marc-Alexander Scheer, Lars Figura	3:02.71		6
4	Great Britain	Jared Deacon, Iwan Thomas, Duaine Ladejo, Mark Richardson	3:02.79		5
5	France	Marc Raquil, Marc Foucan, Bruno Wavelet, Stéphane Diagana	3:02.92		4
6	Italy	Lorenzo Gini, Luca Galletti, Enrico Saraceni, Alessandro Attene	3:05.38		3
7	Greece	Stilianos Dimotsios, Anastasios Gousis, Georgios Ikonomidis, Periklis Iakovakis	3:05.64		2
8	Spain	Eduardo Iván Rodríguez, Alberto Martínez, Salvador Rodríguez, David Canal	3:07.87		1

=== High jump ===
23 June

Rank	Name	Nationality	2.05	2.10	2.15	2.19	2.23	2.26	2.28	2.31	Result	Notes	Points
1	Yaroslav Rybakov	Russia	–	–	–	o	xo	o	o	xxx	2.28		8
2	Grzegorz Sposób	Poland	–	xxo	o	o	o	x–	xx		2.23		7
3	Martin Buß	Germany	–	–	o	o	xxx				2.19		6
4	Robert Mitchell	Great Britain	o	o	xxo	o	xxx				2.19		5
5	David Antona	Spain	o	o	o	xo	xxx				2.19		4
6	Dimitrios Sirrakos	Greece	xo	xo	xxo	xxo	xxx				2.19		3
7	Gregory Gabella	France	xo	o	o	xxx					2.15		2
8	Giulio Ciotti	Italy	o	o	xxo	xxx					2.15		1

=== Pole vault ===
24 June

Rank	Name	Nationality	4.85	5.10	5.25	5.40	5.50	5.60	5.68	5.75	5.85	Result	Notes	Points
1	Michael Stolle	Germany	–	–	–	xo	–	xo	–	xo	xxx	5.75		8
2	Adam Kolasa	Poland	–	o	o	o	o	o	o	xxx		5.68		7
3	Vasiliy Gorshkov	Russia	–	–	o	o	o	o	xo	xxx		5.68		6
4	Khalid Lachheb	France	–	–	o	xxo	o	o	xo	xxx		5.68		5
5	Montxu Miranda	Spain	–	–	xo	–	xxo	–	xxx			5.50		4
6	Marios Evangelou	Greece	o	xxo	xxx							5.10		3
	Nick Buckfield	Great Britain	–	–	–	xxx						NM		0
	Massimo Allevi	Italy	–	xxx								NM		0

=== Long jump ===
23 June

Rank	Name	Nationality	#1	#2	#3	#4	Result	Notes	Points
1	Danila Burkenya	Russia	7.88	x	x	7.89	7.89		8
2	Chris Tomlinson	Great Britain	7.67	7.35	7.40	7.49	7.67		7
3	Grzegorz Marciniszyn	Poland	7.37	7.36	7.62	7.64	7.64		6
4	Alessio Rimoldi	Italy	7.63	x	7.40	7.41	7.63		5
5	Konstantin Krause	Germany	7.60	7.51	7.60	x	7.60		4
6	Konstandinos Koukodimos	Greece	7.34	7.46	7.55	7.45	7.55		3
7	Yann Domenech	France	7.49	7.40	7.48	7.19	7.49		2
8	Yago Lamela	Spain	7.48	6.83	x	7.35	7.48		1

=== Triple jump ===
24 June

Rank	Name	Nationality	#1	#2	#3	#4	Result	Notes	Points
1	Jonathan Edwards	Great Britain	17.26	x	–	17.04	17.26		8
2	Hristos Meletoglou	Greece	16.03	16.59	16.94	17.19	17.19		7
3	Paolo Camossi	Italy	16.43	16.81	16.97	16.81	16.97		6
4	Andrey Kurennoy	Russia	16.63	x	16.07	16.53	16.63		5
5	Karl Taillepierre	France	16.63	x	x	x	16.63		4
6	Jacek Kazimierowski	Poland	15.81	16.30	x	16.26	16.30		3
7	Julio López	Spain	13.82	15.39	16.19	x	16.19		2
8	Charles Michael Friedek	Germany	16.14	x	r		16.14		1

=== Shot put ===
23 June

Rank	Name	Nationality	#1	#2	#3	#4	Result	Notes	Points
1	Manuel Martínez	Spain	x	20.21	x	21.03	21.03		8
2	Pavel Chumachenko	Russia	20.06	20.54	20.02	x	20.54		7
3	Paolo Dal Soglio	Italy	20.02	x	19.75	x	20.02		6
4	Ralf Bartels	Germany	19.50	19.39	19.37	x	19.50		5
5	Leszek Śliwa	Poland	18.31	18.85	x	x	18.85		4
6	Yves Niaré	France	18.24	18.40	18.40	18.64	18.64		3
7	Vaios Tigas	Greece	18.48	18.48	18.27	x	18.48		2
8	Mark Proctor	Great Britain	x	x	18.10	x	18.10		1

=== Discus throw ===
24 June

Rank	Name	Nationality	#1	#2	#3	#4	Result	Notes	Points
1	Lars Riedel	Germany	65.37	66.41	x	66.63	66.63		8
2	Mario Pestano	Spain	62.78	64.14	65.60	64.48	65.60		7
3	Dmitriy Shevchenko	Russia	59.15	x	63.71	65.26	65.26		6
4	Olgierd Stański	Poland	61.11	x	59.90	x	61.11		5
5	Diego Fortuna	Italy	58.66	58.70	58.99	59.81	59.81		4
6	Jean-Claude Retel	France	55.83	58.09	58.64	x	58.64		3
7	Robert Weir	Great Britain	58.23	55.77	57.33	57.27	58.23		2
8	Savvas Panavoglou	Greece	55.76	57.66	58.14	x	58.14		1

=== Hammer throw ===
23 June

Rank	Name	Nationality	#1	#2	#3	#4	Result	Notes	Points
1	Szymon Ziółkowski	Poland	80.87	80.83	80.40	80.37	80.87		8
2	Nicola Vizzoni	Italy	79.28	80.13	78.29	79.89	80.13		7
3	Hristos Polyhroniou	Greece	77.76	78.07	78.34	76.35	78.34		6
4	Nicolas Figère	France	x	76.90	75.49	73.72	76.90		5
5	Karsten Kobs	Germany	73.53	75.79	73.82	x	75.79		4
6	Mick Jones	Great Britain	73.67	70.83	72.88	69.91	73.67		3
7	Moisés Campeny	Spain	68.50	70.44	x	69.79	70.44		2
8	Andrey Yevgenyev	Russia	67.74	x	70.20	x	70.20		1

=== Javelin throw ===
24 June

Rank	Name	Nationality	#1	#2	#3	#4	Result	Notes	Points
1	Konstadinos Gatsioudis	Greece	88.33	–	–	–	88.33		8
2	Sergey Makarov	Russia	83.24	X	–	80.19	83.24		7
3	Raymond Hecht	Germany	77.69	76.35	83.05	x	83.05		6
4	Nick Nieland	Great Britain	80.84	x	x	x	80.84		5
5	Rajmund Kółko	Poland	75.41	77.11	x	79.20	79.20		4
6	Alberto Desiderio	Italy	73.04	74.95	71.34	75.34	75.34		3
7	David Brisseault	France	70.25	73.48	72.43	x	73.48		2
8	Gustavo Dacal	Spain	63.43	71.26	66.44	68.98	71.26		1

== Women's results ==
=== 100 metres ===
23 June
Wind: +2.8 m/s

Rank	Lane	Name	Nationality	Time	Notes	Points
1	6	Marina Kislova	Russia	11.23		8
2	4	Natalya Safronnikova	Belarus	11.26		7
3	5	Katia Benth	France	11.38		6
4	7	Gabi Rockmeier	Germany	11.38		5
5	8	Joice Maduaka	Great Britain	11.45		4
6	3	Manuela Levorato	Italy	11.47		3
7	1	Pavla Andrýsková	Czech Republic	11.73		2
8	2	Evelina Lisenco	Romania	11.83		1

=== 200 metres ===
24 June
Wind: +0.3 m/s

Rank	Name	Nationality	Time	Notes	Points
1	Natalya Safronnikova	Belarus	22.68	NR	8
2	Ionela Târlea	Romania	22.85		7
3	Svetlana Goncharenko	Russia	22.87		6
4	Birgit Rockmeier	Germany	23.04		5
5	Manuela Levorato	Italy	23.18		4
6	Katharine Merry	Great Britain	23.21		3
7	Fabé Dia	France	23.29		2
8	Erika Suchovská	Czech Republic	23.79		2

=== 400 metres ===
23 June

Rank	Lane	Name	Nationality	Time	Notes	Points
1	1	Grit Breuer	Germany	50.49		8
2	7	Francine Landre	France	51.21		7
3	8	Natalya Antyukh	Russia	51.37		6
4	4	Otilia Ruicu	Romania	51.65		5
5	2	Allison Curbishley	Great Britain	51.99		4
6	6	Anna Kozak	Belarus	52.08		3
7	5	Danielle Perpoli	Italy	52.13		2
8	3	Tereza Žížalová	Czech Republic	54.06		1

=== 800 metres ===
23 June

Rank	Name	Nationality	Time	Notes	Points
1	Irina Mistyukevich	Russia	1:59.09		8
2	Ivonne Teichmann	Germany	1:59.39		7
3	Natalya Dukhnova	Belarus	1:59.95		6
4	Virginie Fouquet	France	2:01.82		5
5	Tanya Blake	Great Britain	2:02.30		4
6	Petra Sedláková	Czech Republic	2:02.67		3
7	Sara Palmas	Italy	2:04.86		2
8	Elena Iagăr	Romania	2:05.68		1

=== 1500 metres ===
24 June

Rank	Name	Nationality	Time	Notes	Points
1	Violeta Szekely	Romania	4:06.43		8
2	Olga Yegorova	Russia	4:06.59		7
3	Hayley Tullett	Great Britain	4:07.83		6
4	Alesya Turova	Belarus	4:08.80		5
5	Kathleen Friedrich	Germany	4:09.79		4
6	Andrea Šuldesová	Czech Republic	4:10.28		3
7	Hanane Sabri	France	4:11.73		2
8	Sara Palmas	Italy	4:14.97		1

=== 3000 metres ===
23 June

Rank	Name	Nationality	Time	Notes	Points
1	Kathy Butler	Great Britain	9:03.71		8
2	Cristina Grosu	Romania	9:04.91		7
3	Fatima Yvelain	France	9:05.30		6
4	Liliya Volkova	Russia	9:06.78		5
5	Elisa Rea	Italy	9:06.95		4
6	Sabrina Mockenhaupt	Germany	9:07.96		3
7	Renata Hoppová	Czech Republic	9:16.04		2
8	Svetlana Klimkovich	Belarus	9:23.37		1

=== 5000 metres ===
24 June

Rank	Name	Nationality	Time	Notes	Points
1	Yelena Zadorozhnaya	Russia	14:40.47	CR	8
2	Paula Radcliffe	Great Britain	14:49.84		7
3	Mihaela Botezan	Romania	15:08.78		6
4	Yamna Belkacem	France	15:23.66		5
5	Elisa Rea	Italy	15:33.40		4
6	Luminita Zaituc	Germany	15:41.39		3
7	Lyudmila Volchik	Belarus	16:17.76		2
8	Helena Volná	Czech Republic	16:34.77		1

=== 100 metres hurdles ===
24 June
Wind: +0.6 m/s

Rank	Name	Nationality	Time	Notes	Points
1	Irina Korotya	Russia	13.06		8
2	Linda Ferga	France	13.10		7
3	Kirsten Bolm	Germany	13.15		6
4	Diane Allahgreen	Great Britain	13.23		5
5	Margaret Macchiut	Italy	13.23		4
6	Eva Miklos	Romania	13.53		3
7	Lucie Škrobáková	Czech Republic	13.70		2
	Yevgeniya Likhuta	Belarus	DQ		0

=== 400 metres hurdles ===
23 June

Rank	Lane	Name	Nationality	Time	Notes	Points
1	5	Yuliya Nosova	Russia	53.84	CR	8
2	1	Ionela Târlea	Romania	55.08		7
3	6	Heike Meißner	Germany	55.33		6
4	4	Sylvanie Morandais	France	55.50		5
5	3	Tatyana Kurochkina	Belarus	56.17		4
6	2	Monika Niederstätter	Italy	56.85		3
7	8	Alena Rücklová	Czech Republic	57.60		2
8	7	Tasha Danvers	Great Britain	1:02.97		1

=== 4 × 100 metres relay ===
23 June

Rank	Nation	Athletes	Time	Note	Points
1	Germany	Melanie Paschke, Sina Schielke, Birgit Rockmeier, Marion Wagner	43.02		8
2	Russia	Natalya Ignatova, Irina Khabarova, Marina Kislova, Oksana Ekk	43.15		7
3	France	Katia Benth, Frédérique Bangué, Fabé Dia, Odiah Sidibé	43.45		6
4	Great Britain	Diane Allahgreen, Marcia Richardson, Joice Maduaka, Shani Anderson	43.53		5
5	Italy	Daniela Bellanova, Daniela Graglia, Manuela Grillo, Manuela Levorato	44.66		4
6	Czech Republic	Pavla Andrýsková, Lucie Komrsková, Markéta Pernická, Erika Suchovská	45.50		3
	Romania	Monika Bumbescu, Mirela Gavris, Eva Miklos, Evelina Lisenco	DQ		0
	Belarus	Yuliya Bartsevich, Natalya Safronnikova, Natalya Sologub, Natalya Abramenko	DQ		0

=== 4 × 400 metres relay ===
24 June

Rank	Nation	Athletes	Time	Note	Points
1	Germany	Claudia Marx, Shanta Ghosh, Florence Ekpo-Umoh, Grit Breuer	3:23.81		8
2	Russia	Olga Maksimova, Natalya Khrushcheleva, Yuliya Nosova, Natalya Antyukh	3:24.58		7
3	France	Francine Landre, Peggy Babin, Sylvanie Morandais, Anita Mormand	3:26.23		6
4	Great Britain	Catherine Murphy, Helen Frost, Tanya Blake, Lesley Owusu	3:28.15		5
5	Belarus	Natalya Sologub, Svetlana Usovich, Irina Khlyustova, Anna Kozak	3:28.15		4
6	Romania	Monika Bumbescu, Otilia Ruicu, Maria Rus, Ionela Târlea	3:29.04		3
7	Italy	Nerelys Rodriguez, Fabiola Piroddi, Daniela Graglia, Daniela Perpoli	3:31.96		2
8	Czech Republic	Tereza Žížalová, Petra Sedláková, Alena Rücklová, Klára Dubská	3:36.35		1

=== High jump ===
24 June

Rank	Name	Nationality	1.70	1.75	1.80	1.83	1.86	1.89	1.92	1.95	1.97	Result	Notes	Points
1	Susan Jones	Great Britain	–	–	o	–	o	o	xo	o	xxx	1.95	=NR	8
2	Alina Astafei	Germany	–	o	o	o	xo	o	xxx			1.89		7
3	Olga Kaliturina	Russia	–	o	o	o	o	xo	xxx			1.89		5.5
3	Antonietta Di Martino	Italy	o	o	o	o	o	xo	xxx			1.89		5.5
5	Oana Pantelimon	Romania	–	–	o	o	xxo	xxo	xxx			1.89		4
6	Olga Shedova	Belarus	–	o	o	xxo	xxx					1.83		3
7	Christelle Preau	France	o	xo	o	xxx						1.80		2
8	Iva Straková	Czech Republic	xo	xo	xo	xxx						1.80		1

=== Pole vault ===
23 June

Rank	Name	Nationality	3.40	3.60	3.80	3.90	4.00	4.10	4.20	4.28	4.34	4.40	4.52	4.60	Result	Notes	Points
1	Svetlana Feofanova	Russia	–	–	–	–	–	–	–	–	xo	–	xo	xxx	4.60	CR	8
2	Janine Whitlock	Great Britain	–	–	–	o	o	o	o	o	o	xxx			4.34		7
3	Pavla Hamáčková	Czech Republic	–	–	–	–	o	–	o	–	xo	xxx			4.34		6
4	Christine Adams	Germany	–	–	–	–	o	–	xo	xxx					4.20		5
5	Vanessa Boslak	France	–	–	xxo	–	xxo	–	xo	xxx					4.20		4
6	Arianna Farfaletti	Italy	–	–	o	–	xo	xxo	xxx						4.10		3
7	Yuliya Taratynova	Belarus	o	xxo	xxx										3.60		2
	Silvia Ristea	Romania													DNS		0

=== Long jump ===
24 June

Rank	Name	Nationality	#1	#2	#3	#4	Result	Notes	Points
1	Heike Drechsler	Germany	x	6.48	6.55	6.79	6.79		8
2	Eunice Barber	France	x	6.71	x	x	6.71		7
3	Fiona May	Italy	x	6.45	6.43	6.57	6.57		6
4	Olga Rubleva	Russia	x	x	6.30	6.51	6.51		5
5	Jade Johnson	Great Britain	6.22	6.49	6.08	6.46	6.49		4
6	Eva Miklos	Romania	6.20	6.35	6.17	6.44	6.44		3
7	Lucie Komrsková	Czech Republic	6.25	x	6.34	5.99	6.34		2
8	Natallia Safronava	Belarus	6.04	6.34	r		6.34		1

=== Triple jump ===
23 June

Rank	Name	Nationality	#1	#2	#3	#4	Result	Notes	Points
1	Tatyana Lebedeva	Russia	14.89	x	14.65	x	14.89		8
2	Natallia Safronava	Belarus	14.08	14.09	14.10w	x	14.10w		7
3	Cristina Nicolau	Romania	13.83	x	13.64	x	13.83		6
4	Barbara Lah	Italy	13.69	13.50	x	13.52	13.69		5
5	Nicole Herschmann	Germany	13.16	x	13.69	13.52	13.69		4
6	Amy Zongo	France	x	x	13.45w	13.04	13.45		3
7	Rebecca White	Great Britain	x	x	x	12.82	12.82		2
8	Martina Darmovzalová	Czech Republic	12.27	x	12.67	12.77	12.77		1

=== Shot put ===
24 June

Rank	Name	Nationality	#1	#2	#3	#4	Result	Notes	Points
1	Nadine Kleinert-Schmitt	Germany	19.06	19.30	x	19.02	19.30		8
2	Irina Korzhanenko	Russia	18.93	19.27	x	19.15	19.27		7
3	Assunta Legnante	Italy	16.37	17.51	17.22	17.40	17.51		6
4	Elena Hila	Romania	17.28	x	17.38	17.27	17.38		5
5	Yelena Ivanenko	Belarus	17.08	17.22	x	17.14	17.22		4
6	Laurence Manfredi	France	16.73	16.34	x	x	16.73		3
7	Věra Pospíšilová	Czech Republic	15.04	15.53	15.19	x	15.53		2
8	Joanne Duncan	Great Britain	14.75	15.36	15.26	x	15.36		1

=== Discus throw ===
23 June

Rank	Name	Nationality	#1	#2	#3	#4	Result	Notes	Points
1	Franka Dietzsch	Germany	62.50	64.04	x	x	64.04		8
2	Natalya Sadova	Russia	63.60	61.94	62.48	63.77	63.77		7
3	Nicoleta Grasu	Romania	x	x	62.33	62.00	62.33		6
4	Věra Pospíšilová	Czech Republic	56.48	56.57	58.96	57.30	58.96		5
5	Agnese Maffeis	Italy	58.17	x	x	55.24	58.17		4
6	Melina Robert-Michon	France	56.60	58.07	x	x	58.07		3
7	Lyudmila Starovoitova	Belarus	55.55	56.98	56.87	55.18	56.98		2
8	Philippa Roles	Great Britain	54.18	53.39	53.26	x	54.18		1

=== Hammer throw ===
24 June

Rank	Name	Nationality	#1	#2	#3	#4	Result	Notes	Points
1	Olga Tsander	Belarus	64.33	68.40	65.78	66.87	68.40		8
2	Kirsten Munchow	Germany	62.18	68.09	67.77	68.08	68.09		7
3	Lorraine Shaw	Great Britain	64.15	67.61	67.58	67.98	67.98		6
4	Manuela Montebrun	France	65.54	66.58	x	66.44	66.58		5
5	Ester Balassini	Italy	62.91	65.49	65.26	x	65.49		4
6	Alla Davydova	Russia	62.02	x	61.93	62.13	62.13		3
7	Cristina Buzau	Romania	x	60.87	61.80	x	61.80		2
8	Markéta Hajdu	Czech Republic	55.93	57.10	58.30	x	58.30		1

=== Javelin throw ===
23 June

Rank	Name	Nationality	#1	#2	#3	#4	Result	Notes	Points
1	Nikola Tomečková	Czech Republic	61.66	62.58	64.77	63.39	64.77		8
2	Steffi Nerius	Germany	56.50	x	62.12	63.12	63.12		7
3	Claudia Coslovich	Italy	54.80	55.92	63.07	60.59	63.07		6
4	Tatyana Shikolenko	Russia	59.69	60.09	60.93	61.85	61.85		5
5	Ana Mirela Țermure	Romania	61.61	x	58.69	x	61.61		4
6	Oksana Velichko	Belarus	54.72	56.11	53.19	x	56.11		3
7	Sarah Walter	France	55.27	53.18	55.05	x	55.27		2
8	Karen Martin	Great Britain	51.19	51.73	52.63	51.36	52.63		1
