= Vaios =

Vaios is a given name. Notable people with the given name include:

- Vaios Karagiannis (born 1968), Greek footballer
- Vaios Tigas (born 1978), Greek athlete
