= Dimitrios Mikhas =

Greek triple jumper

Personal information
- Born: 7 June 1958 (age 68) Piraeus, Greece

Sport
- Sport: Track and field
Medal record
Representing Greece
Mediterranean Games
Gold medal – first place	1983 Casablanca	Triple jump

Dimitrios Mikhas (Greek: Δημήτριος Μίχας; born 7 June 1958) is a Greek former triple jumper.

He finished fifth at the 1982 European Indoor Championships, became Balkan champion in 1981 and 1983, and won a gold medal at the 1983 Mediterranean Games. He competed at the 1983 World Championships in Athletics, the 1984 Summer Olympics and the 1985 Summer Universiade without reaching the final.

He also became Greek champion. He represented the club Panelefsniakos AO, and his personal best jump was 17.04 metres, achieved in 1981.
