= Emma Quaglia =

Italian marathon runner

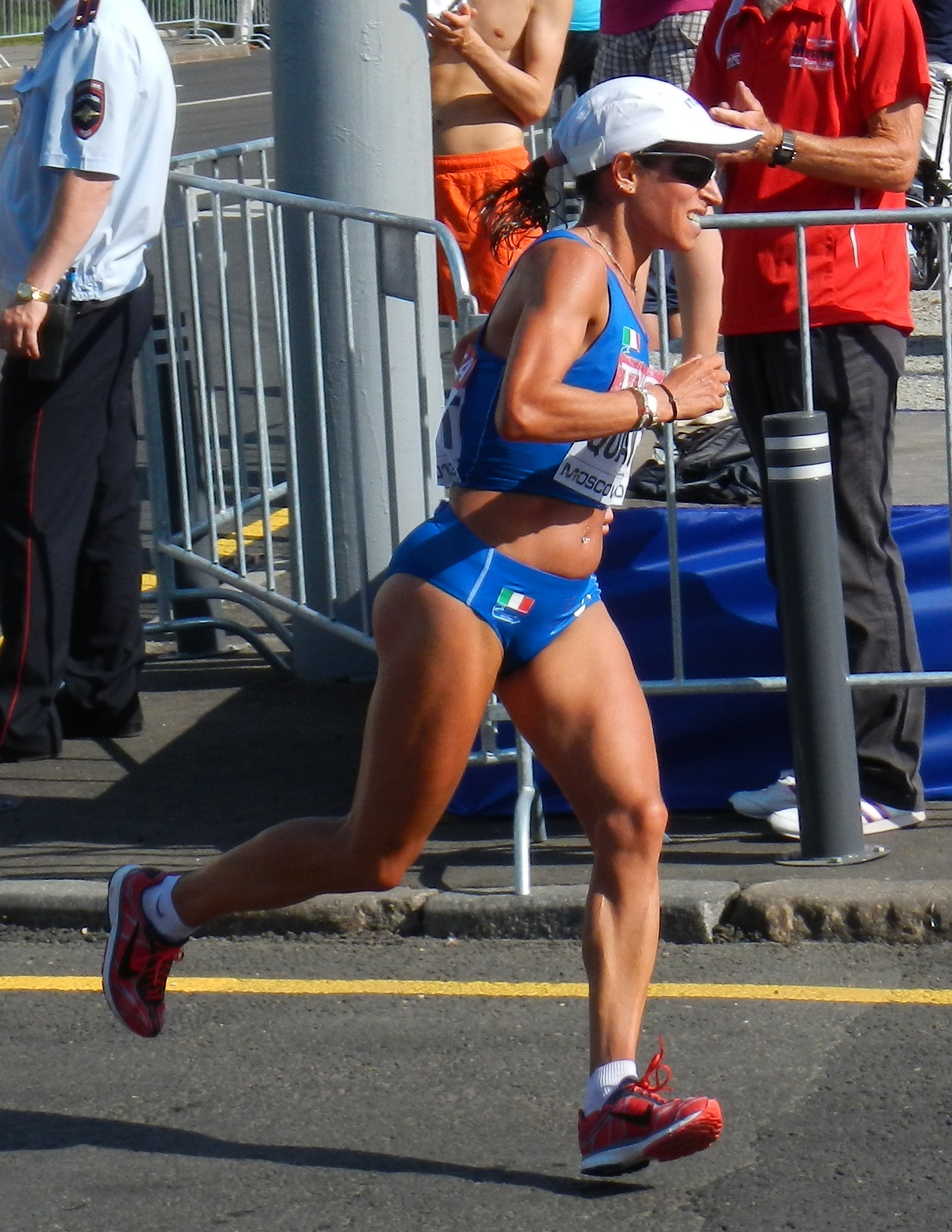
- Emma Quaglia at Moscow 2013.

Personal information
- Full name: Emma Linda Quaglia
- Nationality: Italian
- Born: 15 August 1980 (age 45) Genoa, Italy
- Height: 1.60 m (5 ft 3 in)
- Weight: 48 kg (106 lb)

Sport
- Country: Italy
- Sport: Athletics
- Event: Marathon

Achievements and titles
- Personal best: Marathon: 2:28.15 (2012)

Emma Qauglia (born 15 August 1980) is an Italian marathon runner.

== Biography ==
Emma Qauglia finished sixth at the 2013 World Championships in Athletics – Women's Marathon after suffering from cancer.

== Achievements ==
Year	Competition	Venue	Position	Event	Time	Notes
2013	World Championships	(Russia) Moscow	6th	Marathon	2:34.16	

== See also ==
- Italy at the 2013 World Championships in Athletics
