= Maria Polyzou =

Greek long-distance runner

Personal information
- Nationality: Greek
- Born: 12 November 1968 (age 57) Patras, Greece

Sport
- Sport: Long-distance running
- Event: Marathon

Maria Polyzou (born 10 November 1968) is a Greek long-distance runner. She competed in the women's marathon at the 1996 Summer Olympics.

She was elected to the Hellenic Parliament in the May 2023 Greek legislative election from New Democracy from the Nationwide list.
