= Spyridon Kastanis =

Greek racewalker

Personal information
- Nationality: Greek
- Born: 23 September 1964 (age 61) Athens, Greece

Sport
- Sport: Athletics
- Event: Racewalking

Spyridon Kastanis (born 23 September 1964) is a Greek racewalker. He competed in the men's 50 kilometres walk at the 2000 Summer Olympics and the 2004 Summer Olympics.
