= Theodoros Stamatopoulos =

Greek racewalker

Personal information
- Nationality: Greek
- Born: 24 April 1970 (age 55)

Sport
- Sport: Athletics
- Event: Racewalking

Theodoros Stamatopoulos (born 24 April 1970) is a Greek racewalker. He competed in the men's 50 kilometres walk at the 2000 Summer Olympics and the 2004 Summer Olympics.
