= Kostas Georgakopoulos =

Greek discus thrower

Personal information
- Born: 14 July 1963 (age 63) Athens, Greece

Sport
- Sport: Track and field
Medal record
Representing Greece
Mediterranean Games
Gold medal – first place	1983 Casablanca	Discus throw
Silver medal – second place	1987 Latakia	Discus throw
Summer Universiade
Bronze medal – third place	1987 Zagreb	Discus throw

Konstantinos "Kostas" Georgakopoulos (Greek: Κώστας Γεωργακόπουλος; born 14 July 1963) is a Greek former discus thrower who competed in the 1984 Summer Olympics.

Georgakopoulos was the champion in the discus at the 1983 Mediterranean Games and returned to win a silver medal at the 1987 edition. He was the bronze medallist at the 1987 Summer Universiade.
