= Hrisostomia Iakovou =

Greek long-distance runner

Personal information
- Nationality: Greek
- Born: 9 April 1971 (age 55) Kalymnos, Greece

Sport
- Sport: Long-distance running
- Event: 5000 metres
Medal record
Representing Greece
Mediterranean Games
Gold medal – first place	1997 Bari	10,000m

Hrisostomia Iakovou (born 9 April 1971) is a Greek long-distance runner. She competed in the women's 5000 metres at the 2000 Summer Olympics.
