= Nikolaos Polias =

Greek long-distance runner

Personal information
- Nationality: Greek
- Born: 28 March 1971 (age 55) Athens, Greece
- Height: 183 cm (6 ft 0 in)
- Weight: 69 kg (152 lb)

Sport
- Sport: Long-distance running
- Event: Marathon
- Club: Olympiacos

Achievements and titles
- Personal best: 2:13.53

Nikolaos Polias (born 28 March 1971) is a Greek long-distance runner. He competed in the men's marathon at the 2004 Summer Olympics.
