= Georgios Argiropoulos =

Greek racewalker

Personal information
- Nationality: Greek
- Born: 20 January 1970 (age 56) Patras, Greece

Sport
- Sport: Athletics
- Event: Racewalking

Georgios Argiropoulos (born 20 January 1970) is a Greek racewalker. He competed in the men's 50 kilometres walk at the 2004 Summer Olympics.
