= Konstantina Efedaki =

Greek middle-distance runner

Konstadina Efedaki
Personal information
- Nationality: Greece
- Born: 1 October 1978 (age 47) Athens, Greece
- Height: 1.62 m (5 ft 4 in)
- Weight: 48 kg (106 lb)

Sport
- Sport: Athletics
- Event: Middle distance running
- Club: Panallinios GS (GRE)

Achievements and titles
- Personal best(s): 800 m: 2:01.59 (2004); 1500 m: 4:05.63 (2004); 3000 m: 8:55.77 (2005)

Konstadina Efedaki (Greek: Κωνσταντίνα Εφεντάκη; born October 1, 1978, in Athens) is a Greek middle-distance runner. She is a two-time national champion (2003–2004) for the 1500 metres.

Efedaki represented the host nation Greece at the 2004 Summer Olympics, coincidentally in her home city, where she placed twelfth in the semi-final rounds of the women's 1500 metres, with a time of 4:09.37.

At the 2008 Summer Olympics in Beijing, Efedaki competed for the second time in the 1500 metres. She ran in the first heat against ten other athletes, including Bahrain's Maryam Yusuf Jamal, who was considered a top favorite for this event. She finished the race in tenth place by six seconds behind Kenya's Irene Jelagat, with a slowest possible time of 4:15.02. Efedaki, however, failed to advance into the final, as she placed twenty-fourth overall and was ranked below three mandatory slots for the next round.
