= Georgios Giannelis =

Greek middle-distance runner

Personal information
- Nationality: Greek
- Born: 24 July 1971 (age 54)

Sport
- Sport: Middle-distance running
- Event: Steeplechase

Georgios Giannelis (born 24 July 1971) is a Greek middle-distance runner. He competed in the men's 3000 metres steeplechase at the 2000 Summer Olympics.
