= Elisabetta Artuso =

Italian middle-distance runner

Personal information
- National team: Italy (10 caps)
- Born: 25 April 1974 (age 52) Grosseto, Italy
- Height: 1.72 m (5 ft 8 in)
- Weight: 56 kg (123 lb)

Sport
- Country: Italy
- Sport: Athletics
- Event: Middle-distance running
- Club: G.S. Forestale
- Coached by: Gianni Natali; Marcello Cesaroni

Achievements and titles
- Personal bests: 800 m: 2:01.04 (2004); 1500 m: 4:15.63 (2003)

Elisabetta Artuso (born 25 April 1974) is a former Italian middle-distance runner who won eight national titles at senior level.

== Biography ==
Artuso has been able to win eight Italian titles with a distance of 13 years from the first to the last title.

== Achievements ==
| Year | Competition | Venue | Position | Event | Time | Notes |
|---|---|---|---|---|---|---|
| 2000 | European Cup | (United Kingdom) Gateshead | 8th | 1500 m | 4:21.09 | |
| 2003 | European Cup | (Italy) Florence | 8th | 800 m | 2:11.41 | |

== National titles ==
- Italian Athletics Championships
  - 800 m: 2001, 2004, 2011
- Italian Athletics Indoor Championships
  - 800 m: 1998, 2002, 2003, 2005, 2011
