= Nikolia Mitropoulou =

Greek high jumper (born 1982)

Personal information
- Full name: Nikolia Mitropoulou
- Nickname: Niki
- Nationality: Greece
- Born: 16 February 1982 (age 44) Galatsi, Athens, Greece
- Height: 1.86 m (6 ft 1 in)
- Weight: 63 kg (139 lb)

Sport
- Sport: Athletics
- Event: High jump
- Club: Panionios G.S.S.

Achievements and titles
- Personal best: High jump: 1.91 (2004)

Nikolia "Niki" Mitropoulou (Greek: Νικολία "Νίκη" Μητροπούλου; born February 16, 1982, in Galatsi, Athens) is a Greek high jumper. She attained her best jump of 1.91 metres from the Greek national championships to secure a spot on the Greek athletics squad for the 2004 Summer Olympics. Throughout her sporting career, Mitropoulou trained as a full-fledged member of the athletics team for Panionios G.S.S. in Nea Smyrni, Athens.

Mitropoulou qualified as a lone athlete for the Greek squad in the women's high jump at the 2004 Summer Olympics in Athens, by setting up a B-standard of 1.91 metres from the Greek national championships at the Olympic Stadium. Mitropoulou cleared a satisfying height on her third attempt and missed badly on the first two at both 1.80 and 1.85 metres to share a thirty-first overall place effort with Kazakhstan's Marina Aitova in the qualifying round, failing to reach a 1.89-metre mark on her succeeding jump and thereby advance further to the final.
