= Savvas Panavoglou =

Greek discus thrower

Personal information
- Full name: Savvas Panavoglou
- Nationality: Greece
- Born: 14 August 1974 (age 51) Stockholm, Sweden,
- Height: 1.97 m (6 ft 5 1/2 in)
- Weight: 120 kg (265 lb)

Sport
- Sport: Athletics
- Event: Discus throw
- Club: Iraklis
- Coached by: Kostas Spanidis

Achievements and titles
- Personal best: Discus throw: 63.18 (2002)

Savvas Panavoglou (Greek: Σάββας Παναβόγλου; born 14 August 1974 in Stockholm, Sweden) is a retired Greek discus thrower. Holding dual citizenship to compete internationally, he was selected to compete for the host nation Greece's largest Olympic team in the discus throw at the 2004 Summer Olympics, and also trained throughout his sporting career for Iraklis under his coach Kostas Spanidis. In 2002, Panavoglou has launched a Greek record-breaking throw of 63.18 m from the EAA Permit Meeting in Thessaloniki.

Panavoglou qualified for the Greek squad in the men's discus throw at the 2004 Summer Olympics in Athens by posting an Olympic B-standard throw of 62.73 m from the Vardinoyannia EAA Permit Meeting in Rethymno. During the prelims, Panavoglou unleashed the discus into the field with an initial distance of 57.26 m, and then extended it powerfully to his best effort at 58.47 m on his second attempt. With his next throw being slightly shorter than his best by nearly a full meter, Panavoglou wound up to the twenty-third spot in a field of thirty-nine athletes, and did not advance past the qualifying round.

Panavoglou currently resides in Thessaloniki, and works as a chiropractor for numerous track and field athletes, including Cypriot high jumper Kyriakos Ioannou and Jamaica's two-time Olympic champion Veronica Campbell-Brown.
