= Maria Protopappa =

Greek long-distance runner (born 1973)

María Protópappa (Greek: Μαρία Πρωτόπαππα; born 5 May 1973 in Athens) is a retired Greek long-distance runner who mainly competed in the 5000 metres. She represented her country at the 2004 Summer Olympics without reaching the final.

== Competition record ==
Year	Competition	Venue	Position	Event	Notes
Representing Greece
2004	Olympic Games	Athens, Greece	23rd (h)	5000 m	15:35.07
2005	World Championships	Helsinki, Finland	17th (h)	5000 m	15:32.04
2006	European Championships	Gothenburg, Sweden	9th	5000 m	15:22.13

== Personal bests ==
Outdoor

- 1500 metres – 4:10.51 (Bucharest 2002)
- 3000 metres – 8:59.49 (Haniá 2002)
- 5000 metres – 15:04.03 (Brussels 2006)
- 10,000 metres – 32:46.17 (Maribor 2004)

Indoor

- 3000 metres – 9:19.41 (Piraeus 2001)
