= Marina Vasarmidou =

Greek sprinter (born 1972)

Personal information
- Born: 16 July 1972 (age 53) Ierapetra, Greece
- Height: 1.72 m (5 ft 8 in)
- Weight: 59 kg (130 lb)

Sport
- Sport: Track and field
- Event: 200 metres
- Club: Livikos Ierapetras; Meas Triton

Marína Vasarmídou (Greek: Μαρίνα Βασαρμίδου; born 16 July 1972 in Ierapetra) is a retired Greek athlete who specialised in the sprinting events. She represented her country in the 4 × 100 metres relay at the 2004 Summer Olympics, as well as three World Championships.

== Competition record ==
Year	Competition	Venue	Position	Event	Notes
Representing Greece
1990	European Indoor Championships	Glasgow, United Kingdom	11th (h)	400 m	55.38
1990	World Junior Championships	Plovdiv, Bulgaria	7th	400 m	53.58
1991	Mediterranean Games	Athens, Greece	5th	200 m	53.78
1991	Mediterranean Games	Athens, Greece	6th	400 m	24.19
1991	European Junior Championships	Thessaloniki, Greece	11th (h)	200 m	24.51
1991	European Junior Championships	Thessaloniki, Greece	9th (h)	400 m	54.56
1993	Mediterranean Games	Narbonne, France	6th	400 m	54.71
1996	European Indoor Championships	Stockholm, Sweden	12th (h)	200 m	24.31
1997	Mediterranean Games	Bari, Italy	6th	200 m	23.66
1997	Mediterranean Games	Bari, Italy	2nd	4x100 m relay	43.07
1997	Mediterranean Games	Bari, Italy	4th	4x400 m relay	3:34.67
1997	World Championships	Athens, Greece	9th (h)	4x100 m relay	43.15
1997	World Championships	Athens, Greece	10th (h)	4x400 m relay	3:37.14
1999	Universiade	Palma, Spain	15th (sf)	200 m	24.09
1999	World Championships	Seville, Spain	13th (h)	4x100 m relay	44.68
2002	European Indoor Championships	Vienna, Austria	12th (sf)	200 m	23.80
2003	World Championships	Paris, France	10th (h)	4x100 m relay	43.81
2004	Olympic Games	Athens, Greece	14th (h)	4x100 m relay	44.45
2005	Mediterranean Games	Almería, Spain	7th	200 m	24.33
2005	Mediterranean Games	Almería, Spain	4th	4x100 m relay	45.33

== Personal bests ==
Outdoor

- 100 metres – 11.47 (-0.5 m/s) (Athens 2004)
- 200 metres – 23.43 (+0.2 m/s) (Rethymno 1999)
- 400 metres – 53.01 (Athens 2000)

Indoor

- 60 metres – 7.39 (Paiania 2004)
- 200 metres – 23.65 (Piraeus 2002)
