= Hristiana Tabaki =

Greek hurdler (born 1973)

Personal information
- Born: 13 January 1973 (age 53)

Sport
- Sport: Track and field

Hristiana Tabaki (often written Tambaki, born 13 January 1973) is a retired Greek hurdler who specialized in the 100 metres hurdles.

She finished eighth at the 1993 Mediterranean Games and fourth at the 2001 Mediterranean Games. She won the 1999 and 2001 Balkan Games and the 1998 and 2000 Balkan Championships. She competed at the 1997 World Championships, the 1999 Universiade, and the 2002 European Championships without reaching the final. Domestically, she became Greek champion in 1993, 1996, 1997, 1999, 2000, 2002 and 2003; and several times indoor champion.

Her personal best time was 12.98 seconds, achieved in June 2004 in Athens. In the 60 metres hurdles she had 8.26 seconds from February 1999 in Piraeus.
