= Aleksandr Ryabov (athlete) =

Russian sprinter

Personal information
- Full name: Aleksandr Valentinovich Ryabov
- Nationality: Russian
- Born: 22 December 1975 (age 50) Tolyatti, Russia

Sport
- Sport: Sprinting
- Event: 200 metres
Medal record
Representing Russia
Summer Universiade
Silver medal – second place	2003 Daegu	4x100m relay

Aleksandr Valentinovich Ryabov (born 22 December 1975) is a Russian sprinter. He competed in the men's 200 metres at the 2000 Summer Olympics.
