= Ioanna Kafetzi =

Greek sprinter and long jumper

Personal information
- Full name: Giannoula Kafetzi
- Nationality: Greece
- Born: 30 May 1976 (age 50) Nea Ionia, Magnesia, Thessalia, Greece
- Height: 1.65 m (5 ft 5 in)
- Weight: 55 kg (121 lb)

Sport
- Sport: Athletics
- Events: Sprint, long jump
- Club: Aiolos Macedonia; Gymnastics Club

Achievements and titles
- Personal bests: 100 m: 11.50 (2001); Long jump: 6.71 (2004)
Medal record
Women's athletics
Representing Greece
Mediterranean Games
Bronze medal – third place	2001 Tunis	4×100 m

Giannoula "Ioanna" Kafetzi (Greek: Γιαννούλα Καφετζή; born 30 May 1976 in Néa Ionía, Thessalia) is a retired Greek sprinter and long jumper. Kafetzi won a bronze medal, as part of the women's 4 × 100 m relay team, at the 2001 Mediterranean Games in Tunis, Tunisia, until she decided to focus extensively in the long jump and competed for the Greek squad at the 2004 Summer Olympics. During her athletics career, Kafetzi spanned a personal best of 6.71 metres in the long jump at the Venizelia International Meet in Chania.

Kafetzi qualified for the host nation's athletics squad, along with Stiliani Pilatou and Niki Xanthou, in the women's long jump at the 2004 Summer Olympics in Athens. Two months before the Games, she jumped 6.71 metres to attain both her personal best and an Olympic A-standard at the Venizelia International Meet in Chania. During the prelims, Kafetzi delighted her home crowd with a remarkable leap of 6.49 metres on her first attempt. With a single foul in the subsequent leap and a low mark produced on her third, Kafetzi fell short of a chance to advance further to the final round by six centimetres, as she finished only in sixteenth place against a vast field of thirty-nine long jumpers. She represented Greece at the 2005 World Championships in Athletics, but again did not progress to the final round.
