= Marios Evangelou =

Greek pole vaulter

Personal information
- Full name: Marios Evangelou
- Nationality: Greece
- Born: 8 May 1981 (age 45) Thessaloniki, Greece
- Height: 1.77 m (5 ft 9 1/2 in)
- Weight: 72 kg (159 lb)

Sport
- Sport: Athletics
- Event: Pole vault
- Club: Panathinaikos

Achievements and titles
- Personal best: Pole vault: 5.62 (2004)

Marios Evangelou (Greek: Μάριος Ευαγγέλου; born 8 May 1981 in Thessaloniki) is a retired Greek pole vaulter. He was selected to compete for the host nation Greece's largest Olympic team in the men's pole vault at the 2004 Summer Olympics, and also trained as a member of the athletics squad for the sport club Panathinaikos. In June 2004, Evangelou demolished a national record at 5.62 m to win the title from the Greek Championships at the Olympic Stadium in Athens.

Evangelou qualified for the Greek squad in the men's pole vault at the 2004 Summer Olympics in Athens. Two months before the Games, he successfully cleared 5.62 m to demolish the four-year-old national record (previously set by Stavros Tsitouras in 2000) and reach an Olympic B-standard from the Greek Championships at the Olympic Stadium. Much to the delight from the immense Greek crowd inside the Olympic Stadium, Evangelou started off with two disappointing fouls until he strongly vaulted over 5.30 m on the third attempt. Failing to clear his next targeted height of 5.50 m after three straight misses, Evangelou shared a thirty-third spot with South Korea's Kim Yoo-Suk as the last remaining pole vaulters to round out the overall standings at the end of the qualifying round.
