= Panagiotis Stroubakos =

Greek middle-distance runner (born 1972)

Personal information
- Born: 8 September 1972 (age 54) Athens, Greece

Sport
- Sport: Track and field

Panagiotis Stroubakos (Greek: Παναγιώτης Στρουμπάκος; born 8 September 1972) is a retired Greek middle distance runner who specialized in the 800 metres.

He competed at the Olympic Games in 2000 and 2004, the World Championships in 1997 and 1999 and the 2002 European Championships without reaching the final.

His personal best time is 1:45.00 minutes, achieved in August 1997 in Zürich. This is the Greek record.

== Honours ==
| Year | Competition | Venue | Position | Event | Notes |
Representing Greece
| 1997 | World Championships | Athens, Greece | 13th (sf) | 800 m | 1:46.81 |
| 1997 | Universiade | Catania, Italy | 7th (sf) | 800 m | 1:47.73 |
| 1998 | European Indoor Championships | Valencia, Spain | 19th (h) | 800 m | 1:51.50 |
| 1998 | European Championships | Budapest, Hungary | 16th (sf) | 1500 m | 3:44.01 |
| 2000 | Olympic Games | Sydney, Australia | 34th (h) | 800 m | 1:47.96 |
| 2001 | Mediterranean Games | Rades, Tunisia | 5th | 1500 m | 3:49.23 |
| 2002 | European Championships | Munich, Germany | 17th (h) | 800 m | 1:48.00 |
| 2002 | European Championships | Munich, Germany | 17th (h) | 1500 m | 3:47.94 |
| 2004 | Olympic Games | Athens, Greece | 44th (h) | 800 m | 1:47.69 |
