= Vaios Tigas =

Greek shot putter

Personal information
- Nationality: Greek
- Born: 16 October 1978 (age 47) Athens, Greece

Sport
- Sport: Athletics
- Event: Shot put

Vaios Tigas (Greek: Βάϊος Τίγκας; born 16 October 1978) is a Greek athlete. He competed in the men's shot put at the 2000 Summer Olympics.
