= List of European under-20 records in athletics =

European junior records in the sport of athletics are ratified by the European Athletics Association (EAA). Athletics records comprise the best performance of an athlete before the year of their 20th birthday. Technically, in all under-20 age divisions, the age is calculated "on December 31 of the year of competition" to avoid age group switching during a competitive season.

== Outdoor ==
Key: Awaiting ratification Record not kept by EAA Not ratified or later rescinded by EAA

=== Men ===
Event	Record	Athlete	Nationality	Date	Meet	Place	Age	Ref.	Video
100 m	10.04 (+0.2 m/s)	Christophe Lemaitre	France	24 July 2009	European Junior Championships	Novi Sad, Serbia	19 years, 43 days		
100 m	10.01 (+1.3 m/s)	Jake Odey-Jordan	Great Britain	20 June 2026	Nike Nationals	Eugene, United States	18 years, 180 days		
200 m	19.96 A (−1.0 m/s)	Blessing Afrifah	Israel	4 August 2022	World U20 Championships	Cali, Colombia	18 years, 282 days		
300 m	32.43	Jake Odey-Jordan	Great Britain	4 April 2026	Miramar Invitational	Miramar, United States	18 years, 103 days		
400 m	45.01	Thomas Schönlebe	East Germany	15 July 1984		Berlin, Germany	18 years, 344 days		
400 m	44.56	Aleksey Danilov	Russia	21 July 2025	Athletics Match meeting U18, U20	Brest, Belarus	18 years, 328 days		
600 m	1:16.03	Noam Mamu	Israel	5 May 2024	Internationales thallos Läufermeeting	Pliezhausen, Germany	18 years, 53 days		
800 m	1:44.14	Max Burgin	Great Britain	19 May 2021	Golden Spike Ostrava	Ostrava, Czech Republic	18 years, 362 days		
1000 m	2:14.37	Niels Laros	Netherlands	7 July 2024	FBK Games	Hengelo, Netherlands	19 years, 81 days		
1500 m	3:29.54	Niels Laros	Netherlands	6 August 2024	Olympic Games	Paris, France	19 years, 111 days		
Mile	3:48.93	Niels Laros	Netherlands	16 September 2023	Prefontaine Classic	Eugene, United States	18 years, 152 days		
2000 m	4:49.68	Niels Laros	Netherlands	8 September 2023	Memorial Van Damme	Brussels, Belgium	18 years, 144 days		
3000 m	7:43.20	Ari Paunonen	Finland	22 June 1977	Weltklasse in Köln	Cologne, Germany	19 years, 104 days		
Two miles	8:29.46	Lukas Verzbicas	Lithuania	4 June 2011	Prefontaine Classic	Eugene, United States	18 years, 149 days		
5000 m	13:02.03	Jakob Ingebrigtsen	Norway	20 July 2019	Diamond League	London, United Kingdom	18 years, 304 days		
5 km (road)	13:26	Niels Laros	Netherlands	11 February 2024	MONACO RUN 5 km	Monaco	18 years, 300 days		
10,000 m	28:11.71	Abdullahi Dahir Rabi	Norway	13 April 2022	Night of Highlights	Oslo, Norway	19 years, 17 days		
10 km (road)	27:54	Jakob Ingebrigtsen	Norway	19 October 2019	Hytteplanmila	Hole, Norway	19 years, 30 days		
Half marathon	1:02:53	Emil Millán de la Oliva	Sweden	17 October 2020	World Half Marathon Championships	Gdynia, Poland	19 years, 85 days		
110 m hurdles (99.0 cm)	12.72 A (+1.0 m/s)	Sasha Zhoya	France	21 August 2021	World U20 Championships	Nairobi, Kenya	19 years, 57 days		
110 m hurdles	13.44 (−0.8 m/s)	Colin Jackson	Great Britain	19 July 1986	World Junior Championships	Athens, Greece	19 years, 151 days		
400 m hurdles	48.59	Michal Rada	Czech Republic	9 August 2026	World U20 Championships	Eugene, United States	19 years, 76 days		
2000 m steeplechase	5:25.01	Arsenios Tsiminos	Greece	2 October 1980		Athens, Greece	19 years, 257 days		
3000 m steeplechase	8:28.35	Bakr El Asri	Spain	9 August 2026	World U20 Championships	Eugene, United States	19 years, 193 days		
3000 m steeplechase	8:26.81	Jakob Ingebrigtsen	Norway	8 July 2017	Guldensporen Meeting	Kortrijk, Belgium	16 years, 292 days		
3000 m steeplechase	8:24.40	Bakr El Asri	Spain	20 June 2026	Track Night Vienna	Vienna, Austria	19 years, 143 days		
High jump	2.37 m	Dragutin Topić	Yugoslavia	12 August 1990	World Junior Championships	Plovdiv, Bulgaria	19 years, 153 days		
High jump	2.37 m	Steve Smith	Great Britain	20 September 1992	World Junior Championships	Seoul, South Korea	19 years, 175 days		
Pole vault	6.05 m	Armand Duplantis	Sweden	12 August 2018	European Championships	Berlin, Germany	18 years, 275 days		
Long jump	8.38 m (−0.5 m/s)	Mattia Furlani	Italy	8 June 2024	European Championships	Rome, Italy	19 years, 122 days		
Triple jump	17.50 m (+0.4 m/s)	Volker Mai	East Germany	23 June 1985		Erfurt, Germany	19 years, 51 days		
Shot put (6 kg)	22.73 m	David Storl	Germany	14 July 2009		Osterode am Harz, Germany	18 years, 352 days		
Shot put (6 kg)	22.94 m	Konrad Bukowiecki	Poland	1 May 2016	Hanžeković Memorial	Bojanowo, Poland	19 years, 45 days		
Shot put (6 kg)	23.34 m X	Konrad Bukowiecki	Poland	19 July 2016	World U20 Championships	Bydgoszcz, Poland	19 years, 124 days		
Shot put	21.14 m	Konrad Bukowiecki	Poland	9 June 2016	Bislett Games	Oslo, Norway	19 years, 84 days		
Discus throw (1.75 kg)	71.37 m	Mika Sosna	Germany	10 June 2022	16. Schönebecker SoleCup	Schönebeck, Germany	18 years, 362 days		
Discus throw	65.31 m	Mykyta Nesterenko	Ukraine	3 June 2008		Tallinn, Estonia	17 years, 49 days		
Hammer throw (6 kg)	84.73 m	Mykhaylo Kokhan	Ukraine	19 July 2019	European U20 Championships	Borås, Sweden	18 years, 178 days		
Hammer throw	78.33 m	Olli-Pekka Karjalainen	Finland	5 August 1999		Seinäjoki, Finland	19 years, 151 days		
Javelin throw	84.98 m	György Herczeg	Hungary	26 July 2023	Austrian Open	Eisenstadt, Austria	18 years, 352 days		
Decathlon (Senior implements)	8397 pts	Torsten Voss	East Germany	7 July 1982	German Championships	Erfurt, Germany	19 years, 45 days		
Decathlon (Senior implements)	100m (wind) / Long jump (wind) / Shot put / High jump / 400m / 110m H (wind) / Discus / Pole vault / Javelin / 1500m; 10.76 / 7.66 m / 14.41 m / 2.09 m / 48.37 / 14.37 / 41.76 m / 4.80 m / 62.90 m / 4:34.04								
Decathlon (6 kg shot, 1.75 kg discus, 99 cm hurdles)	8514 pts	Hubert Trościanka	Poland	7–8 August 2025	European U20 Championships	Tampere, Finland	19 years, 13 days		
Decathlon (6 kg shot, 1.75 kg discus, 99 cm hurdles)	100m (wind) / Long jump (wind) / Shot put / High jump / 400m / 110m H (wind) / Discus / Pole vault / Javelin / 1500m; 10.74 (−0.7 m/s) / 7.26 m (+0.3 m/s) / 15.48 m / 1.94 m / 46.21 / 14.23 (−2.0 m/s) / 43.36 m / 4.80 m / 68.87 m / 4:28.59								
5000 m walk (track)	19:03.16	Diego García	Spain	24 June 2015	Encuentro Diputación de Cáceres	Plasencia, Spain	19 years, 156 days		
5000 m walk (track)	18:56.19	Nicolo' Vidal	Italy	8 August 2026	World U20 Championships	Eugene, United States	18 years, 97 days		
10,000 m walk (track)	38:46.4 h	Viktor Burayev	Russia	20 May 2000		Moscow, Russia	17 years, 271 days		
10 km walk (road)	38:28	Stanislav Yemelyanov	Russia	19 September 2009		Saransk, Russia	18 years, 331 days		
20 km walk (road)	1:17:25	Sergey Shirobokov	Russia	9 June 2018	Russian Race Walking Championships	Cheboksary, Russia	19 years, 113 days		
4 × 100 m relay	38.90 A	Dominik Łuczyński; Patryk Krupa; Jakub Pietrusa; Oliwer Wdowik	Poland	22 August 2021	World U20 Championships	Nairobi, Kenya			
4 × 100 m relay	38.90	Divine Iheme; Jake Odey-Jordan; Ethan Franklin; James Arminio	Great Britain	9 August 2026	World U20 Championships	Eugene, United States	16 years, 312 days 18 years, 230 days 19 years, 189 days 18 years, 163 days		
4 × 400 m relay	3:04.05	Klaudio Gjetja; Andrea Romani; Alessandro Sibilio; Edoardo Scotti	Italy	15 July 2018	World U20 Championships	Tampere, Finland	19 years, 79 days 18 years, 67 days		

=== Women ===
Event	Record	Athlete	Nationality	Date	Meet	Place	Age	Ref.	Video
100 m	10.88 (+2.0 m/s)	Marlies Oelsner	East Germany	1 July 1977		Dresden, Germany	19 years, 102 days		
200 m	22.19 (+1.5 m/s)	Natalya Bochina	Soviet Union	30 July 1980	Olympic Games	Moscow, Soviet Union	18 years, 208 days		
300 m	36.46	Linsey MacDonald	Great Britain	13 July 1980	Amoco International Invitational	London, United Kingdom	16 years, 152 days		
400 m	49.42	Grit Breuer	Germany	27 August 1991	World Championships	Tokyo, Japan	19 years, 192 days		
600 m	1:25.12	Audrey Werro	Switzerland	18 May 2023	Nationales Auffahrts-Meeting	Langenthal, Switzerland	19 years, 52 days		
800 m	1:55.88	Keely Hodgkinson	Great Britain	3 August 2021	Olympic Games	Tokyo, Japan	19 years, 153 days		
1000 m	2:34.89	Audrey Werro	Switzerland	17 June 2023	Meeting Nikaïa	Nice, France	19 years, 82 days		
1500 m	3:59.96	Zola Budd	Great Britain	30 August 1985	Memorial Van Damme	Brussels, Belgium	19 years, 96 days		
Mile	4:17.57	Zola Budd	Great Britain	21 August 1985	Weltklasse Zürich	Zürich, Switzerland	19 years, 87 days		
Mile (road)	4:42.5 h Wo	Lera Miller	Germany	7 September 2025	Kö Mile	Düsseldorf, Germany	18 years, 171 days		
2000 m	5:33.15	Zola Budd	Great Britain	13 July 1984	London Peugeot-Talbot Games	London, United Kingdom	18 years, 48 days		
3000 m	8:28.83	Zola Budd	Great Britain	7 September 1985	Golden Gala	Rome, Italy	19 years, 104 days		
Two miles	9:26.6 h	Zola Budd	Great Britain	9 June 1985		London, United Kingdom	19 years, 14 days		
5000 m	14:48.07	Zola Budd	Great Britain	26 August 1985		London, United Kingdom	19 years, 92 days		
5000 m	14:39.56	Innes Fitzgerald	Great Britain	19 July 2025	London Athletics Meet	London, United Kingdom	19 years, 104 days		
5 km (road)	15:08	Innes Fitzgerald	Great Britain	6 April 2025	Bristol Track Club 5K	Bristol, United Kingdom	19 years, 0 days		
10,000 m	31:40.42	Annemari Sandell	Finland	27 July 1996	Olympic Games	Atlanta, United States	19 years, 207 days		
10 km (road)	31:29	Karoline Bjerkeli Grøvdal	Norway	3 May 2009	Sentrumsløpet	Oslo, Norway	18 years, 323 days		
Half marathon	1:11:27	Layes Abdullayeva	Azerbaijan	1 November 2009	Delhi Half Marathon	New Delhi, India	18 years, 156 days		
100 m hurdles	12.85 (+2.0 m/s)	Elvira Herman	Belarus	24 July 2016	World U20 Championships	Bydgoszcz, Poland	19 years, 35 days		
400 m hurdles	55.19	Linda Botková	Czech Republic	18 July 2026	European U18 Championships	Rieti, Italy	16 years, 162 days		
2000 m steeplechase	6:19.23	Gréta Varga	Hungary	26 July 2020	Honvéd Kupa Nemzetközi Atlétikai Verseny	Budapest, Hungary	16 years, 220 days		
3000 m steeplechase	9:32.74	Gesa-Felicitas Krause	Germany	30 August 2011	World Championships	Daegu, South Korea	19 years, 27 days		
3000 m steeplechase	9:32.68	Anna Emilie Møller	Denmark	13 August 2016	Olympic Games	Rio de Janeiro, Brazil	19 years, 16 days		
High jump	2.04 m	Yaroslava Mahuchikh	Ukraine	30 September 2019	World Championships	Doha, Qatar	18 years, 11 days		
Pole vault	4.61 m	Alyona Lutkovskaya	Russia	21 May 2015	Irkutsk Region Championships	Irkutsk, Russia	19 years, 67 days		
Long jump	7.14 m (+1.1 m/s)	Heike Drechsler	East Germany	4 June 1983		Bratislava, Czechoslovakia	18 years, 172 days		
Triple jump	14.62 m (+1.0 m/s)	Tereza Marinova	Bulgaria	25 August 1996	World Junior Championships	Sydney, Australia	18 years, 355 days		
Shot put	20.54 m	Astrid Kumbernuss	East Germany	1 July 1989		Orimattila, Finland	19 years, 146 days		
Discus throw	74.40 m	Ilke Wyludda	East Germany	13 September 1988		Berlin, Germany	19 years, 169 days		
Hammer throw	73.43 m	Silja Kosonen	Finland	28 June 2021		Vaasa, Finland	18 years, 194 days		
Javelin throw	63.52 m	Adriana Vilagoš	Serbia	2 August 2022	World U20 Championships	Cali, Colombia	18 years, 212 days		
Javelin throw	63.96 m X (Note: mark was unratified because doping control was not conducted until the next day)	Elina Tzengko	Greece	1 August 2020	Pan Hellenic U20 Championships	Ioannina, Greece	17 years, 334 days		
Heptathlon	6542 pts	Carolina Klüft	Sweden	10 August 2002	European Championships	Munich, Germany	19 years, 189 days		
Heptathlon	100m H (wind) / High jump / Shot put / 200m (wind) / Long jump (wind) / Javelin / 800m; 13.33 (−0.3 m/s) / 1.89 m / 13.16 m / 23.71 (−0.3 m/s) / 6.36 m (+1.1 m/s) / 47.61 m / 2:17.99								
5000 m walk (track)	20:42.74	Serena Di Fabio	Italy	4 July 2026	Italian U20 Championships	Caorle, Italy	18 years, 223 days		
5000 m walk (track)	20:28.05	Tatyana Kalmykova	Russia	12 July 2007	World Youth Championships	Ostrava, Czech Republic	17 years, 183 days		
5 km walk (road)	21:06	Anisya Kornikova	Russia	10 June 2006		Saransk, Russia	16 years, 230 days		
10,000 m walk (track)	42:47.25	Anežka Drahotová	Czech Republic	23 July 2014	World Junior Championships	Eugene, United States	19 years, 1 day		
10,000 m walk (track)	41:45.84	Elvira Khasanova	Russia	3 August 2019	Summer Spartakiad	Cheboksary, Russia	19 years, 205 days		
10,000 m walk (track)	42:43.0 h	Svetlana Vasilyeva	Russia	27 February 2011	Russian Winter Walking Championships	Sochi, Russia	18 years, 218 days		
10 km walk (road)	42:44	Tatyana Kalmykova	Russia	10 May 2008		Cheboksary, Russia	18 years, 121 days		
10 km walk (road)	41:52	Tatyana Mineyeva	Russia	5 September 2009		Penza, Russia	19 years, 26 days		
10 km walk (road)	41:55	Irina Stankina	Russia	11 February 1995		Adler, Russia	17 years, 323 days		
20,000 m walk (track)	1:37:03.8 h	Anna Pudovkina	Russia	22 September 2003	Russian 20,000m Race Walking Championships	Izhevsk, Russia	18 years, 221 days		
20 km walk (road)	1:25:30	Anisya Kirdyapkina	Russia	23 February 2008	Russian Winter Race Walking Championships	Adler, Russia	18 years, 123 days		
4 × 100 m relay	43.27	Katrin Fehm; Keshia Kwadwo; Sophia Junk; Jennifer Montag	Germany	23 July 2017	European U20 Championships	Grosseto, Italy			
4 × 400 m relay	3:28.39	Derr; Fabert; Woehlk; Grit Breuer	East Germany	31 July 1988	World Junior Championships	Sudbury, Canada			

=== Mixed ===
Event	Record	Athlete	Nation	Date	Meet	Place	Age	Ref.
4 × 100 m relay	41.21	Edwin Fermin Galvan; Elisa Valensin; Francesco Pagliarini; Kelly Doualla	Italy	8 August 2006	World U20 Championships	Eugene, United States	18 years, 100 days 19 years, 219 days 19 years, 5 days 16 years, 261 days	
4 × 400 m relay	3:18.16	Lukáš Mareš; Sophie Pischnothová; Jakub Marek; Linda Botková	Czechia	5 August 2026	World U20 Championships	Eugene, United States	19 years, 67 days 18 years, 192 days 17 years, 192 days 16 years, 180 days	

== Indoor ==
=== Men ===
Event	Record	Athlete	Nationality	Date	Meet	Place	Age	Ref.
50 m	5.72	Sven Matthes	East Germany	19 February 1988			18 years, 180 days	
60 m	6.51	Mark Lewis-Francis	Great Britain	11 March 2001	World Championships	Lisbon, Portugal	18 years, 188 days	
200 m	20.65	Tomáš Horák	Czech Republic	1 March 2026	Czech Championships	Ostrava, Czech Republic	17 years, 361 days	
200 m	20.57	Ralf Lübke	West Germany	11 February 1984		Stuttgart, Germany	18 years, 239 days	
300 m	33.41	Jonathan Sacoor	Belgium					
400 m	45.64	Tomáš Horák	Czech Republic	22 February 2026	Czech U20 Championships	Ostrava, Czech Republic	17 years, 354 days	
600 m	1:17.14	Benjamin Lakošeljac	Slovenia	31 January 2026	Indoor Meeting Zagreb	Zagreb, Croatia	18 years, 362 days	
800 m	1:46.89	Kacper Lewalski	Poland	22 February 2022	Copernicus Cup	Toruń, Poland	18 years, 291 days	
800 m	1:46.13	Cian McPhillips	Ireland	20 February 2021		Dublin, Ireland	18 years, 258 days	
800 m	1:44.35	Yuriy Borzakovskiy	Russia	30 January 2000		Dortmund, Germany	18 years, 293 days	
1000 m	2:22.98	Nils Schumann	Germany	5 February 1997		Erfurt, Germany	18 years, 261 days	
1000 m	2:21.84	René Bauschinger	Germany	2 February 2003		Stuttgart, Germany	17 years, 239 days	
1000 m	2:20.36	David Sharpe	Great Britain	8 March 1986		Cosford, United Kingdom	18 years, 243 days	
1500 m	3:36.02	Jakob Ingebrigtsen	Norway	20 February 2019	PSD Bank Meeting	Düsseldorf, Germany	18 years, 154 days	
Mile	4:03.88	Lukas Verzbicas	Lithuania	5 February 2011		Boston, United States	18 years, 30 days	
Mile	4:02.34	Robbie Farnham-Rose	Great Britain	24 February 2013		Fayetteville, United States	19 years, 50 days	
Mile	3:56.40	Nicholas Griggs	Ireland	10 March 2022		Dublin, Ireland	17 years, 82 days	
Mile	3:57.47	Vivien Henz	Luxembourg	4 February 2023	BU Scarlet and White Invitational	Boston, United States	18 years, 164 days	
Mile	4:00.13	Filip Toul	Czech Republic	4 February 2025	Czech Indoor Gala	Ostrava, Czech Republic	17 years, 186 days	
3000 m	7:47.98	Alex Pintado	Spain	7 February 2025	Gran Premio Ciudad de Valencia	Valencia, Spain	18 years, 117 days	
5000 m	14:06.78	Lukas Verzbicas	Lithuania	11 March 2011		New York City, United States	18 years, 64 days	
5000 m	13:42.8 h	Leonid Shumskiy	Soviet Union	9 March 1977		Voroshilovgrad, Soviet Union	18 years, 67 days	
5000 m	14:06.55	Axel Vang Christensen	Denmark	31 December 2020		Randers, Denmark	16 years, 154 days	
5000 m	13:57.38	Joseph O'Brien	Great Britain	23 February 2023	ACC Championships	Louisville, United States	18 years, 234 days	
5000 m	13:51.24	Joseph O'Brien	Great Britain	2 December 2023	Boston University Sharon Colyear-Danville Season Opener	Boston, United States	19 years, 151 days	
60 m hurdles	7.67	Frank Busemann	Germany	12 March 1994	European Championships	Paris, France	19 years, 14 days	
60 m hurdles (99/100 cm)	7.34	Sasha Zhoya	France	22 February 2020	French U20 Championships	Miramas, France	17 years, 242 days	
300 m hurdles	35.93 OT	Petteri Pulkkinen	Finland	19 February 1992	Finnish Championships	Tampere, Finland		
High jump	2.28 m	Aleksey Dmitrik	Russia	26 January 2003		Samara, Russia	18 years, 289 days	
High jump	2.31 m (Note: disallowed for record purposes)	Danil Lysenko	Russia	29 January 2016		Moscow, Russia	18 years, 255 days	
High jump	2.35 m	Vladimir Yashchenko	Soviet Union	12 March 1978	European Championships	Milan, Italy	19 years, 59 days	
Pole vault	5.88 m	Armand Duplantis	Sweden	25 February 2018	All Star Perche	Clermont-Ferrand, France	18 years, 107 days	
Pole vault	5.93 m (Note: unratifiable because doping test not made on the day of competition)	Armand Duplantis	Sweden	5 May 2018		Baton Rouge, United States	18 years, 176 days	
Long jump	8.34 m (Note: outdoor mark ratified as absolute record)	Mattia Furlani	Italy	17 February 2024	Italian Championships	Ancona, Italy	19 years, 10 days	
Triple jump	17.20 m	Melvin Raffin	France	3 March 2017	European Championships	Belgrade, Serbia	18 years, 206 days	
Shot put	20.61 m	Konrad Bukowiecki	Poland	26 February 2016	Villa de Madrid	Madrid, Spain	18 years, 346 days	
Shot put (6 kg)	22.48 m	Konrad Bukowiecki	Poland	8 January 2016		Toruń, Poland	18 years, 297 days	
Shot put (6 kg)	22.96 m (Note: disallowed for record purposes)	Konrad Bukowiecki	Poland	29 December 2016		Spała, Poland	19 years, 287 days	
Weight throw	22.31 m	Ággelos Mantzouránis	Greece	8 December 2023	M City Classic	Minneapolis, United States	19 years, 221 days	
Heptathlon (senior)	5953 pts	Michael Kohnle	Germany	25 February 1989		Stadtallendorf, Germany	18 years, 298 days	
Heptathlon (senior)	60m / Long jump / Shot put / High jump / 60m H / Pole vault / 1000m; 6.96 / 7.23 m / 14.89 m / 2.06 m / 8.14 / 4.50 m / 2:49.00							
Heptathlon (junior)	6062 pts	Jente Hauttekeete	Belgium	13–14 February 2021	Mehrkampf - Siebenkampf U20	Frankfurt, Germany	18 years, 336 days	
Heptathlon (junior)	60m / Long jump / Shot put / High jump / 60m H / Pole vault / 1000m; 7.07 / 7.33 m / 15.64 m / 2.10 m / 8.06 / 4.70 m / 2:46.71							
5000 m walk	18:47.2 h	Sergey Kozhevnikov	Russia	29 December 2019	Memorial Skurigin	Saransk, Russia	18 years, 234 days	
4 × 400 m relay								

=== Women ===
Event	Record	Athlete	Nationality	Date	Meet	Place	Age	Ref.
60 m	7.07	Ewa Swoboda	Poland	12 February 2016	Copernicus Cup	Toruń, Poland	18 years, 201 days	
200 m	23.15	Dina Asher-Smith	Great Britain	2 March 2014	England Age Group Championships	Sheffield, United Kingdom	18 years, 88 days	
200 m	22.58	Grit Breuer	Germany	10 March 1991	World Indoor Championships	Seville, Spain	19 years, 22 days	
300 m	37.31	Lurdes Gloria Manuel	Czech Republic	23 January 2024		Prague, Czech Republic	18 years, 195 days	
400 m	52.22	Johanna Martin	Germany	15 February 2025	German U20 Indoor Championships	Dortmund, Germany	18 years, 311 days	
600 m	1:26.14	Audrey Werro	Switzerland	29 January 2023		Magglingen, Switzerland	18 years, 308 days	
800 m	1:59.03	Keely Hodgkinson	Great Britain	30 January 2021	Indoor Track & Field Vienna	Vienna, Austria	18 years, 333 days	
1000 m	2:41.79	Delia Sclabas	Switzerland	24 February 2019	Swiss U20 Championships	Magglingen, Switzerland	18 years, 108 days	
1000 m	2:38.57 OT	Katrin Wühn	East Germany	14 January 1984		Berlin, Germany	18 years, 56 days	
1500 m	4:08.38	Konstanze Klosterhalfen	Germany	6 February 2016	Weltklasse in Karlsruhe	Karlsruhe, Germany	18 years, 353 days	
Mile	4:29.31	Sofia Thøgersen	Denmark	30 January 2024	Czech Indoor Gala	Ostrava, Czech Republic	18 years, 208 days	
3000 m	8:40.05	Innes Fitzgerald	Great Britain	4 February 2025	Czech Indoor Gala	Ostrava, Czech Republic	18 years, 304 days	
5000 m	16:27.69	Yuliya Stashkiv	Ukraine	14 February 2003		Fayetteville, United States	19 years, 6 days	
5000 m	15:41.00	Sarah Collins	Ireland	7 December 2013	Boston University Season Opener	Boston, United States	19 years, 83 days	
60 m hurdles	8.00	Klaudia Siciarz	Poland	18 February 2017	Polish Championships	Toruń, Poland	18 years, 340 days	
300 m hurdles	41.19 OT	Annika Kumlin	Finland	18 February 1996		Kuopio, Finland		
High jump	2.02 m	Yaroslava Mahuchikh	Ukraine	31 January 2020	Indoor Meeting Karlsruhe	Karlsruhe, Germany	18 years, 134 days	
Pole vault	4.71 m	Wilma Murto	Finland	31 January 2016	Zweibrücken Meeting	Zweibrücken, Germany	17 years, 234 days	
Long jump	6.91 m	Larissa Iapichino	Italy	20 February 2021	Italian Championships	Ancona, Italy	18 years, 217 days	
Triple jump	13.91 m	Ana Peleteiro	Spain	23 February 2014		Sabadell, Spain	18 years, 83 days	
Triple jump	14.18 m	Yevgeniya Stavchanska	Ukraine	7 February 1999	National Championships	Lviv, Ukraine	17 years, 135 days	
Shot put	17.58 m	Emel Dereli	Turkey	28 December 2013		Istanbul, Turkey	17 years, 306 days	
Shot put	17.58 m (Note: disallowed for record purposes)	Alyona Bugakova	Russia	9 February 2016	Russian Junior Championships	Novocheboksarsk, Russia	18 years, 291 days	
Shot put	20.51 m	Heidi Krieger	East Germany	8 February 1984		Budapest, Hungary	18 years, 203 days	
Pentathlon	4542 pts	Alina Shukh	Ukraine	4 February 2017	International Combined Events Meeting	Lasnamäe, Estonia	17 years, 358 days	
Pentathlon	60m H / High jump / Shot put / Long jump / 800m; 8.98 / 1.89 m / 13.81 m / 6.12 m / 2:16.84							
Pentathlon	4556 pts (Note: No Doping Control.)	Sophia Yakushina	Russia	27 February 2025	SEC Championships	College Station, United States	19 years, 51 days	
Pentathlon	60m H / High jump / Shot put / Long jump / 800m; 8.39 / 1.78 m / 12.11 m / 6.42 m / 2:13.59							
Pentathlon	4550 pts (Note: disallowed for record purposes)	Alina Shukh	Ukraine	27 January 2017	Ukrainian Team Championships	Zaporizhzhya, Ukraine	17 years, 350 days	
Pentathlon	60m H / High jump / Shot put / Long jump / 800m; 8.85 / 1.88 m / 14.27 m / 6.04 m / 2:17.69							
Pentathlon	4558 pts X	Nafissatou Thiam	Belgium	3 February 2013		Ghent, Belgium	18 years, 168 days	
Pentathlon	60m H / High jump / Shot put / Long jump / 800m; 8.65 / 1.84 m / 14.00 m / 6.30 m / 2:21.18							
Pentathlon	4694 pts OT	Sibylle Thiele	East Germany	26 January 1984		Senftenberg, Germany	18 years, 326 days	
Pentathlon	60m H / High jump / Shot put / Long jump / 800m; 8.59 / 1.86 m / 14.32 m / 6.51 m / 2:20.4 h							
3000 m walk	12:05.6 h	Lyudmila Yefimkina	Russia	1 March 1998		Insar, Russia	16 years, 191 days	
3000 m walk	12:05.1 h OT	Anastasiya Kolchina	Russia	24 September 2023	Final of the Race Walk Queen of Sports	Saransk, Russia	18 years, 136 days	
5000 m walk	21:30.1	Vera Sokolova	Russia	6 January 2005		Chelyabinsk, Russia	17 years, 212 days	
4 × 400 m relay								
