= Athletics in Italy =

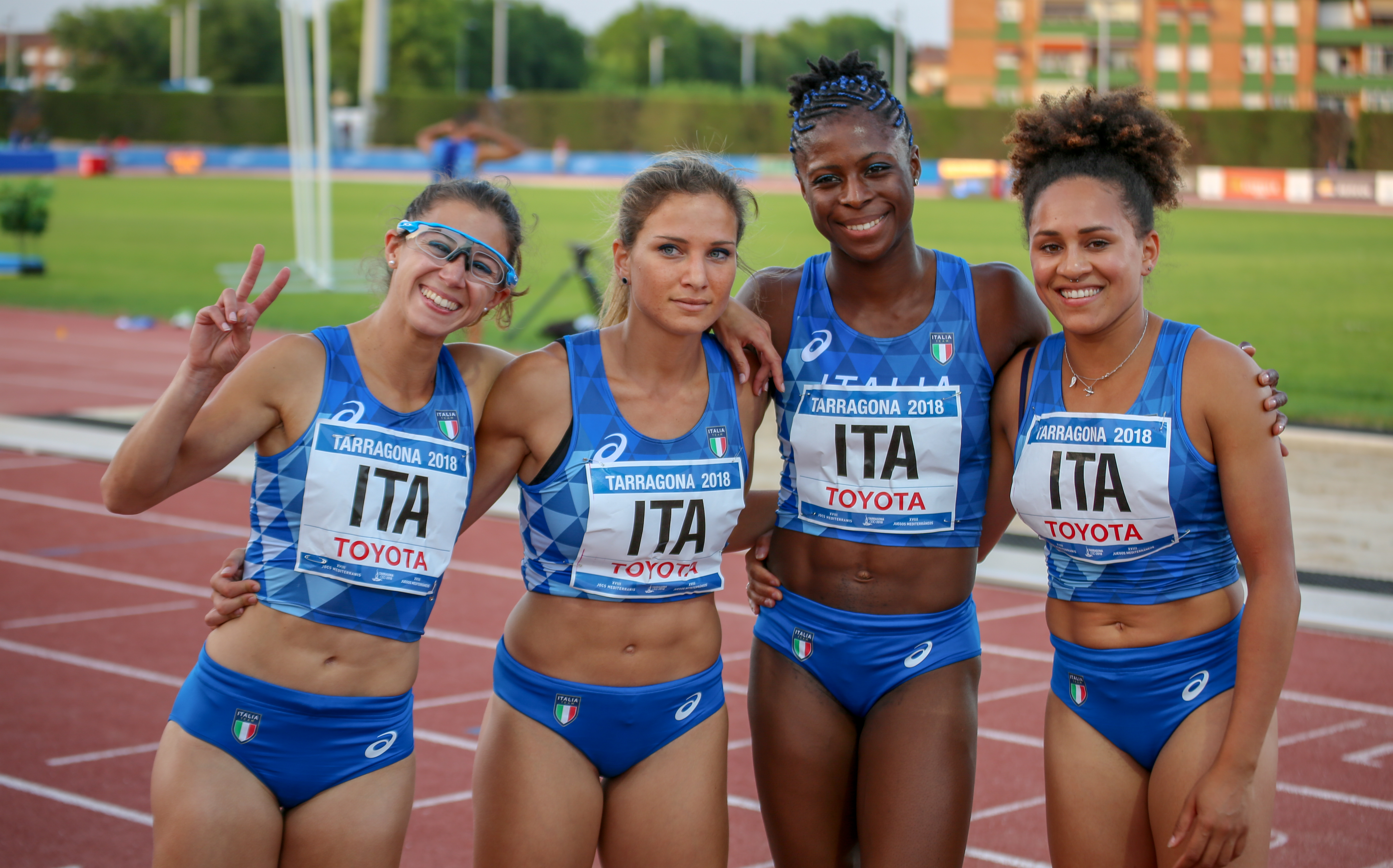
Siragusa, Bongiorni, Hooper, Herrera, the former national record of the 4 × 100 m relay.

Athletics in Italy is the 7th most popular participation sport, practiced by 995,000 people.

== Affiliations ==
The governing body of Athletics in Italy is Federazione Italiana di Atletica Leggera affiliated to European federation, the European Athletic Association (EAA), international federation, the International Association of Athletics Federations (IAAF) and Italian National Olympic Committee (CONI), which in turn is a member of International Olympic Committee (IOC).

== All-time top lists ==
The lists are updated to 28-Jun-2026, and regards to the 22 Olympic events. For high jump, pole vault, long jump, triple jump and shot put performance also affects indoor competitions, measures are identified by (i) in the tables.

Performance achieved in the season 2026 outdoor and indoor

=== 100 metres ===
Men

#	Athlete	Born	Performance	Venue	Date
1	Marcell Jacobs	1994	9.80	(Japan) Tokyo	1 Aug 2021
2	Chituru Ali	1999	9.96	(Finland) Turku	17 Jun 2024
3	Filippo Tortu	1998	9.99	(Spain) Madrid	22 Jun 2018
4	Pietro Mennea	1952	10.01	Mexico City	4 Sep 1979
5	Simone Collio	1979	10.06	(Italy) Rieti	21 Jul 2009
6	Carlo Boccarini	1976	10.08	(Italy) Rieti	9 May 1998
7	Jacques Riparelli	1983	10.11	(Switzerland) La Chaux-de-Fonds	5 Jul 2015
8	Matteo Melluzzo	2002	10.12	(Italy) La Spezia	29 Jun 2024
9	Fabio Cerutti	1985	10.13	(Italy) Cagliari	19 Jul 2008
9	Lorenzo Patta	2000	10.13	(Italy) Savona	13 May 2021
9	Samuele Ceccarelli	2000	10.13	(Italy) Florence	2 Jun 2023

Women

#	Athlete	Born	Performance	Venue	Date
1	Zaynab Dosso	1999	11.01	(Italy) Rome	9 Jun 2024
2	Manuela Levorato	1977	11.14	(Switzerland) Lausanne	4 Jul 2001
2	Kelly Doualla	2009	11.14	(Italy) Rieti	17 Jul 2026
4	Alessia Pavese	1998	11.19	(Italy) Foligno	10 Jul 2026
5	Irene Siragusa	1993	11.21	(Italy) Orvieto	17 Jun 2018
6	Giada Gallina	1973	11.23	(Italy) Milan	4 Jul 1997
7	Gloria Hooper	1992	11.24	(Italy) Rieti	22 May 2021
8	Arianna De Masi	1999	11.26	(Italy) Rome	18 May 2024
9	Anita Pistone	1976	11.27	(France) Annecy	21 Jun 2008
9	Anna Bongiorni	1993	11.27	(Italy) Rovereto	26 Jun 2021

=== 200 metres ===
Men

#	Athlete	Born	Performance	Venue	Date
1	Pietro Mennea	1952	19.72	Mexico City	10 Sep 1979
2	Fausto Desalu	1994	20.08	(Switzerland) La Chaux-de-Fonds	14 Jul 2024
3	Filippo Tortu	1998	20.10	(United States) Eugene	20 Jul 2022
4	Andrew Howe	1985	20.28	(Italy) Grosseto	15 Jul 2004
5	Andrea Federici	1997	20.35	(Italy) Sestriere	22 Jun 2024
5	Filippo Dezza	2005	20.35	(United Kingdom) Birmingham	13 Aug 2026
7	Diego Marani	1990	20.36	(Switzerland) Zurich	14 Aug 2014
8	Pierfrancesco Pavoni	1963	20.38	(Italy) Grosseto	10 Aug 1987
8	Marco Torrieri	1978	20.38	(Canada) Edmonton	20 Aug 2001
10	Stefano Tilli	1962	20.40	(Italy) Cagliari	9 Sep 1984

Women

#	Athlete	Born	Performance	Venue	Date
1	Libania Grenot	1983	22.56	(United States) Tampa	27 May 2016
2	Manuela Levorato	1977	22.60	(Spain) Seville	24 Aug 1999
3	Dalia Kaddari	2001	22.64	(Estonia) Tallinn	10 Jul 2021
4	Vittoria Fontana	2000	22.79	(Germany) Bochum	24 Jul 2025
5	Marisa Masullo	1959	22.88	(Italy) Verona	1 Jun 1984
6	Gloria Hooper	1992	22.89	(Italy) Rieti	26 Jun 2016
7	Irene Siragusa	1993	22.96	(Taiwan) Taipei	26 Aug 2017
8	Vincenza Calì	1983	22.98	(Italy) Rieti	7 Sep 2008
9	Margherita Castellani	2008	22.99	(United States) Eugene	7 Aug 2026
10	Elena Cambiolo	2006	23.05	(Italy) Molfetta	12 Jul 2026

=== 400 metres ===
Men

#	Athlete	Born	Performance	Venue	Date
1	Edoardo Scotti	2000	44.45	(Japan) Tokyo	14 Sep 2025
2	Luca Sito	2003	44.75	(Italy) Rome	9 Jun 2024
3	Davide Re	1993	44.77	(Switzerland) La Chaux-de-Fonds	30 Jun 2019
4	Alessandro Sibilio	1999	45.08	(Italy) Nocera Inferiore	18 Jun 2022
5	Mohamed Soudassi	2006	45.10	(Italy) Molfetta	11 Jul 2026
6	Matteo Galvan	1988	45.12	(Italy) Rieti	25 Jun 2016
7	Andrea Barberi	1979	45.19	(Italy) Rieti	27 Aug 2006
8	Lorenzo Benati	2002	45.21	(Italy) Florence	26 Jul 2026
9	Claudio Licciardello	1986	45.25	(China) Beijing	18 Aug 2008
10	Mauro Zuliani	1959	45.26	(Italy) Rome	5 Sep 1981

Women

#	Athlete	Born	Performance	Venue	Date
1	Libania Grenot	1983	50.30	(Italy) Pescara	2 Jul 2009
2	Anna Polinari	1999	50.36	(Spain) Madrid	16 Jul 2026
3	Virginia Troiani	1996	51.06	(Switzerland) Geneva	21 Jun 2025
4	Alice Mangione	1997	51.07	(France) Paris	6 Aug 2024
5	Daniela Reina	1981	51.18	(Italy) Rieti	17 Aug 2006
6	Alessandra Bonora	2000	51.27	(United Kingdom) Birmingham	12 Aug 2026
7	Virna De Angeli	1976	51.31	(Italy) Bari	17 Jun 1997
8	Benedicta Chigbolu	1989	51.67	(Switzerland) La Chaux-de-Fonds	5 Jul 2015
9	Patrizia Spuri	1973	51.74	(Hungary) Budapest	20 Aug 1998
10	Eloisa Coiro	2000	51.79	(Italy) Savona	20 May 2026

=== 800 metres ===
Men

#	Athlete	Born	Performance	Venue	Date
1	Francesco Pernici	2003	1:43.60	(France) Tomblaine	3 Jul 2026
2	Marcello Fiasconaro	1949	1:43.7	(Italy) Milan	27 Jun 1973
3	Andrea Longo	1975	1:43.74	(Italy) Rieti	3 Sep 2000
4	Catalin Tecuceanu	1999	1:43.75	Monaco	12 Jul 2024
5	Donato Sabia	1963	1:43.88	(Italy) Florence	13 Jun 1984
6	Andrea Benvenuti	1969	1:43.92	Monaco	11 Aug 1992
7	Giuseppe D'Urso	1969	1:43.95	(Italy) Rome	5 Jun 1996
8	Simone Barontini	1999	1:44.34	(Hungary) Budapest	24 Aug 2023
9	Giovanni Lazzaro	2004	1:44.59	(Poland) Poznań	28 Jun 2026
10	Giordano Benedetti	1989	1:44.67	(Italy) Rome	6 Jun 2013

Women

#	Athlete	Born	Performance	Venue	Date
1	Eloisa Coiro	2000	1:57.56	(United Kingdom) Birmingham	11 Aug 2026
2	Gabriella Dorio	1957	1:57.66	(Italy) Pisa	5 Jul 1980
3	Elisa Cusma	1981	1:58.63	(Japan) Osaka	26 Aug 2007
4	Elena Bellò	1997	1:58.89	(United Kingdom) London	20 Jul 2024
5	Marta Zenoni	1999	1:59.45	(Italy) Brescia	15 Jul 2025
6	Fabia Trabaldo	1972	1:59.51	(Italy) Caserta	11 Jun 1992
7	Patrizia Spuri	1973	1:59.96	(Italy) Rieti	30 Aug 1998
8	Yusneysi Santiusti	1984	2:00.04	Monaco	15 Jul 2016
9	Agnese Possamai	1953	2:00.36	(Italy) Pisa	5 Jul 1980
10	Federica Del Buono	1994	2:00.58	(Italy) Rieti	7 Sep 2014

=== 1500 metres ===
Men

#	Athlete	Born	Performance	Venue	Date
1	Pietro Arese	1999	3:30.74	(France) Paris	6 Aug 2024
2	Federico Riva	2000	3:31.42	(Italy) Rome	6 Jun 2025
3	Ossama Meslek	1997	3:32.77	(France) Paris	4 Aug 2024
4	Gennaro Di Napoli	1968	3:32.78	(Italy) Rieti	9 Sep 1990
5	Joao Bussotti	1993	3:33.08	(Germany) Dessau	21 Jun 2025
6	Mohad Abdikadar	1993	3:33.79	(Italy) Padua	3 Sep 2023
7	Stefano Mei	1963	3:34.57	(Italy) Rieti	7 Sep 1986
8	Davide Tirelli	1966	3:34.61	(France) Nice	15 Jul 1992
9	Yemaneberhan Crippa	1996	3:35.26	(Italy) Rovereto	5 Aug 2020
10	Alessandro Lambruschini	1965	3:35.27	(Italy) Rome	22 Jul 1987

Women

#	Athlete	Born	Performance	Venue	Date
1	Nadia Battocletti	2000	3:57.54	(Switzerland) Bellinzona	30 Aug 2026
2	Sintayehu Vissa	1996	3:58.11	(France) Paris	8 Aug 2024
3	Gabriella Dorio	1957	3:58.65	(Italy) Tirrenia	25 Aug 1982
4	Marta Zenoni	1999	3:59.16	(United Kingdom) London	19 Jul 2025
5	Gaia Sabbatini	1999	3:59.49	(Hungary) Budapest	12 Aug 2025
6	Ludovica Cavalli	2000	4:01.64	(Italy) Rome	4 Jun 2026
7	Paola Pigni	1945	4:02.85	(West Germany) Munich	9 Sep 1972
8	Federica Del Buono	1994	4:03.45	(Spain) Castellón de la Plana	16 Jun 2022
9	Fabia Trabaldo	1972	4:03.82	Monaco	7 Aug 1993
10	Silvana Cruciata	1953	4:03.88	(Italy) Turin	15 Jul 1981

=== 3000 metres ===
Men

#	Athlete	Born	Performance	Venue	Date
1	Yemaneberhan Crippa	1996	7:37.90	(United Kingdom) Gateshead	13 Jul 2021
2	Gennaro Di Napoli	1968	7:39.54	(Italy) Formia	18 May 1996
3	Daniele Meucci	1985	7:41.74	(Sweden) Stockholm	19 Aug 2012
4	Francesco Panetta	1963	7:42.73	(Italy) Cagliari	16 Sep 1987
5	Stefano Mei	1963	7:42.85	(France) Nice	15 Jul 1986
6	Stefano Baldini	1971	7:43.14	(Switzerland) Bellinzona	12 Jul 1996
7	Salvatore Antibo	1962	7:43.57	(Italy) Trapani	21 Sep 1991
8	Ossama Meslek	1997	7:43.63	(Italy) Nembro	2 Aug 2022
9	Alessandro Lambruschini	1965	7:44.7	(Italy) Tirrenia	26 Jul 1997
10	Vittorio Fontanella	1953	7:45.2	(Italy) Bologna	12 Sep 1981

Women

#	Athlete	Born	Performance	Venue	Date
1	Nadia Battocletti	2000	8:26.27	(Morocco) Rabat	25 May 2025
2	Roberta Brunet	1965	8:35.65	Monaco	16 Aug 1997
3	Agnese Possamai	1953	8:37.96	(Finland) Helsinki	10 Aug 1983
4	Sintayehu Vissa	1996	8:40.81	(Italy) Rovereto	3 Sep 2024
5	Marta Zenoni	1999	8:41.72	(Sweden) Stockholm	15 Jun 2025
6	Nadia Dandolo	1962	8:44.36	(Sweden) Stockholm	3 Jul 1991
7	Margherita Gargano	1952	8:46.31	(Italy) Rome	14 Sep 1982
8	Silvana Cruciata	1953	8:46.8	(Italy) Rome	25 Apr 1981
9	Federica Del Buono	1994	8:46.84	(Italy) Rovereto	6 Sep 2023
10	Micol Majori	1998	8:47.00	(France) Marseille	10 Jun 2026

=== 5000 metres ===
Men

#	Athlete	Born	Performance	Venue	Date
1	Yemaneberhan Crippa	1996	13:02.26	(Czechoslovakia) Ostrava	8 Sep 2020
2	Salvatore Antibo	1962	13:05.59	(Italy) Bologna	8 Jun 1990
3	Francesco Panetta	1963	13:06.76	(Switzerland) Zurich	4 Aug 1993
4	Alberto Cova	1958	13:10.06	(Norway) Oslo	27 Jul 1985
5	Stefano Mei	1963	13:11.57	(West Germany) Stuttgart	31 Aug 1986
6	Gennaro Di Napoli	1968	13:17.46	(Italy) Rome	8 Jun 1995
7	Pietro Riva	1997	13:18.29	(France) Maisons-Laffitte	6 Jul 2024
8	Daniele Meucci	1985	13:19.00	(Belgium) Heusden-Zolder	7 Jul 2012
9	Venanzio Ortis	1955	13:19.19	(Italy) Rieti	9 Sep 1981
10	Said El Otmani	1991	13:19.30	(Morocco) Rabat	16 Jun 2019

Women

#	Athlete	Born	Performance	Venue	Date
1	Nadia Battocletti	2000	14:23.15	(Italy) Rome	6 Jun 2025
2	Roberta Brunet	1965	14:44.50	(West Germany) Cologne	16 Aug 1996
3	Elisa Palmero	1999	14:57.87	(Belgium) Oordegem	9 Aug 2025
4	Maria Guida	1966	14:58.84	(Italy) Rome	5 Jun 1996
5	Federica Del Buono	1994	15:00.05	(Italy) Rome	7 Jul 2024
6	Silvia Weissteiner	1979	15:02.65	(Germany) Berlin	16 Sep 2007
7	Micol Majori	1998	15:04.32	(Italy) Caorle	2 Aug 2025
8	Ludovica Cavalli	2000	15:05.39	(Belgium) Bruxelles	23 May 2026
9	Elena Romagnolo	1982	15:06.38	(United Kingdom) London	7 Aug 2012
10	Nadia Dandolo	1962	15:11.64	(Italy) Bologna	18 Jul 1990

=== 10,000 metres ===
Men

#	Athlete	Born	Performance	Venue	Date
1	Yemaneberhan Crippa	1996	27:10.76	(Qatar) Doha	6 October 2019
2	Salvatore Antibo	1962	27:16.50	(Finland) Helsinki	29 June 1989
3	Francesco Panetta	1963	27:24.16	(Finland) Helsinki	29 June 1989
4	Venanzio Ortis	1955	27:31.48	(Czechoslovakia) Prague	29 August 1978
5	Daniele Meucci	1985	27:32.86	(United States) Stanford	29 April 2012
6	Alberto Cova	1958	27:37.59	(Switzerland) Lausanne	30 June 1983
7	Franco Fava	1952	27:42.65	(Finland) Helsinki	30 June 1977
8	Stefano Mei	1963	27:43.97	(Norway) Oslo	5 July 1986
9	Stefano Baldini	1971	27:43.98	(Slovakia) Bratislava	29 May 1996
10	Marco Mazza	1977	27:44.05	(Italy) Camaiore	6 April 2002

Women

#	Athlete	Born	Performance	Venue	Date
1	Nadia Battocletti	2000	30:38.23	(Japan) Tokyo	13 September 2025
2	Maura Viceconte	1967	31:05.57	(Netherlands) Heusden	5 August 2000
3	Elisa Palmero	1999	31:18.03	(United Kingdom) Birmingham	15 June 2025
4	Silvia Sommaggio	1969	31:24.12	(Netherlands) Heusden	5 August 2000
5	Federica Del Buono	1994	31:25.41	(Italy) Rome	11 June 2024
6	Maria Guida	1966	31:27.82	(Sweden) Gothenburg	9 August 1995
7	Veronica Inglese	1990	31:37.43	(Netherlands) Amsterdam	6 July 2016
8	Anna Arnaudo	2000	31:39.86	(United Kingdom) London	18 May 2024
9	Nadia Ejjafini	1977	31:45.14	(Spain) Bilbao	3 June 2012
10	Agata Balsamo	1970	31:56.49	(Italy) Trento	31 May 2000

=== 110/100 metres hurdles ===
Men

#	Athlete	Born	Performance	Venue	Date
1	Lorenzo Simonelli	2002	13.05	(Italy) Rome	8 Jun 2024
2	Paolo Dal Molin	1987	13.27	(Italy) Rovereto	26 Jun 2021
3	Emanuele Abate	1985	13.28	(Italy) Turin	8 Jun 2012
4	Andrea Giaconi	1974	13.35	(France) Annecy	23 Jun 2002
5	Laurent Ottoz	1970	13.42	(Germany) Berlin	30 Aug 1994
5	Hassane Fofana	1992	13.42	(Italy) Rovereto	26 Jun 2021
7	Emiliano Pizzoli	1974	13.43	(Italy) Milan	10 Jun 1998
8	Eddy Ottoz	1944	13.46	Mexico City	17 Oct 1968
8	Lorenzo Perini	1994	13.46	(Italy) Naples	12 Jul 2019
10	Mauro Rossi	1973	13.48	(Italy) Rome	23 May 1998

Women

#	Athlete	Born	Performance	Venue	Date
1	Giada Carmassi	1994	12.69	(Sweden) Stockholm	15 Jun 2025
2	Celeste Polzonetti	2005	12.74	(United States) Eugene	11 Jun 2026
3	Luminosa Bogliolo	1995	12.75	(Japan) Tokyo	1 Aug 2021
4	Veronica Borsi	1987	12.76	(Italy) Orvieto	2 Jun 2013
5	Elena Carraro	2001	12.79	(Japan) Tokyo	15 Sep 2025
6	Marzia Caravelli	1981	12.85	(France) Montgeron	13 May 2012
7	Veronica Besana	2002	12.88	(Italy) Trieste	26 Jul 2025
8	Elisa Di Lazzaro	1998	12.90	(Italy) Savona	13 May 2021
9	Carla Tuzzi	1967	12.97	(Spain) Valencia	12 Jun 1994
10	Micol Cattaneo	1982	12.98	(France) Annecy	22 Jun 2008
10	Angelika Węgierska	1994	12.98	(Switzerland) La Chaux-de-Fonds	14 Jul 2024

=== 400 metres hurdles ===
Men

#	Athlete	Born	Performance	Venue	Date
1	Alessandro Sibilio	1999	47.50	(Italy) Rome	11 Jun 2024
2	Fabrizio Mori	1969	47.54	(Canada) Edmonton	10 Aug 2001
3	Laurent Ottoz	1970	48.52	(United States) Atlanta	31 Jul 1996
4	Gianni Carabelli	1979	48.84	(Italy) Rome	8 Jul 2005
5	José Bencosme	1992	48.91	(Algeria) Oran	1 Jul 2022
6	Mario Lambrughi	1992	48.99	(Italy) Rieti	13 May 2018
7	Giorgio Frinolli	1970	49.04	(Italy) Milan	6 Jun 2001
8	Ashraf Saber	1973	49.08	(Italy) Rome	5 Jun 1996
9	Roberto Frinolli	1940	49.14	Mexico City	14 Oct 1968
10	Gabriele Montefalcone	1997	49.15	(China) Chengdu	3 Aug 2023

Women

#	Athlete	Born	Performance	Venue	Date
1	Ayomide Folorunso	1996	53.89	(Hungary) Budapest	22 Aug 2023
2	Alice Muraro	2000	54.36	(Japan) Tokyo	15 Sep 2025
3	Yadisleidy Pedroso	1987	54.54	(China) Shanghai	18 May 2013
4	Benedetta Ceccarelli	1980	54.79	(Italy) Rieti	28 Aug 2005
5	Rebecca Sartori	1997	54.82	(Hungary) Budapest	21 Aug 2023
6	Linda Olivieri	1998	54.99	(Italy) Rome	10 Jun 2024
7	Monika Niederstätter	1974	55.10	(Spain) Seville	22 Aug 1999
8	Eleonora Marchiando	1997	55.13	(Switzerland) Geneva	10 Jun 2023
9	Irmgard Trojer	1964	55.42	(Greece) Athens	10 Jul 1991
10	Manuela Gentili	1978	55.54	(Switzerland) Lucerne	17 Jul 2012

=== 3000 metres steeplechase ===
Men

#	Athlete	Born	Performance	Venue	Date
1	Francesco Panetta	1963	8:08.57	(Italy) Rome	5 Sep 1987
2	Alessandro Lambruschini	1965	8:08.78	(Germany) Stuttgart	21 Aug 1993
3	Ahmed Abdelwahed	1996	8:10.29	(Italy) Rome	9 Jun 2022
4	Osama Zoghlami	1994	8:11.00	(Italy) Rome	9 Jun 2022
5	Giuseppe Maffei	1974	8:11.85	(Germany) Cologne	8 Aug 1999
6	Mariano Scartezzini	1954	8:12.5h	(Italy) Rome	5 Aug 1980
7	Angelo Carosi	1964	8:14.02	Monaco	2 Aug 1994
8	Ala Zoghlami	1994	8:14.06	(Japan) Tokyo	30 Jul 2021
9	Luciano Di Pardo	1969	8:17.32	(Germany) Nuremberg	13 Jun 1999
10	Yassin Bouih	1996	8:18.37	(Poland) Chorzów	18 May 2024

Women

#	Athlete	Born	Performance	Venue	Date
1	Elena Romagnolo	1982	9:27.48	(China) Beijing	15 Aug 2008
2	Isabel Mattuzzi	1995	9:34.02	(Germany) Berlin	10 Aug 2018
3	Martina Merlo	1993	9:37.72	(France) Nice	12 Jun 2021
4	Giulia Martinelli	1991	9:39.51	(Belgium) Brussels	16 Sep 2011
5	Eleonora Curtabbi	1997	9:40.90	(Spain) Barcelona	5 Jul 2023
6	Francesca Bertoni	1993	9:43.80	(France) Lille	24 Jun 2017
7	Anna Arnaudo	2000	9:45.86	(Italy) Bergamo	11 Sep 2021
8	Emma Quaglia	1980	9:48.33	(France) Paris	9 Sep 2009
9	Laura Dalla Montà	1993	9:53.02	(Italy) Pescara	9 Sep 2018
10	Valeria Roffino	1990	9:53.82	(Italy) Rovereto	21 Jul 2014

=== Half marathon ===
Not recognized performance

Men

#	Athlete	Born	Performance	Venue	Date
1	Yemaneberhan Crippa	1996	59:01	(Italy) Naples	22 February 2026
2	Pietro Riva	1997	59:41	(Spain) Valencia	22 October 2023
3	Eyob Faniel	1992	1:00:07	(Italy) Siena	28 February 2021
4	Rachid Berradi	1975	1:00:20	(Italy) Milan	13 April 2002
5	Marco Mazza	1977	1:00:24	(Italy) Milan	13 April 2002
6	Pasquale Selvarolo	1999	1:00:32	(Italy) Ravenna	12 November 2023
7	Giuliano Battocletti	1975	1:00:47	(Italy) Udine	29 September 2002
8	Stefano Baldini	1971	1:00:50	(Sweden) Malmö	17 June 2000
8	Yohanes Chiappinelli	1997	1:00:50	(Spain) Valencia	27 October 2024
10	Vincenzo Modica	1971	1:01:03	(Italy) Milan	3 April 1993
(6)	Yohanes Chiappinelli	1997	1:00:45	(Italy) Pisa	9 October 2022

Women

#	Athlete	Born	Performance	Venue	Date
1	Nadia Ejjafini	1977	1:08:27	(Italy) Cremona	16 October 2011
1	Sofiia Yaremchuk	1994	1:08:27	(Italy) Naples	25 February 2024
3	Valeria Straneo	1976	1:08:48	(Italy) Milan	25 March 2012
4	Maria Guida	1966	1:09:00	(Sweden) Malmö	12 June 2000
5	Elisa Palmero	1999	1:09:02	(Italy) Reggio Emilia	16 May 2025
6	Maura Viceconte	1967	1:09:19	(France) Ivry-sur-Seine	22 April 2001
7	Gloria Marconi	1979	1:09:25	(Italy) Ostia	23 February 2003
8	Rosaria Console	1968	1:09:34	(Italy) Ostia	27 February 2005
9	Fatna Maraoui	1977	1:10:08	(Italy) Cremona	16 October 2011
10	Anna Incerti	1980	1:10:10	(Italy) Verona	16 February 2014
10	Sara Dossena	1980	1:10:10	(Italy) Udine	23 September 2018
(1)	Valeria Straneo	1976	1:07:46	(Italy) Ostia	26 February 2012
(2)	Anna Incerti	1980	1:08:18	(Italy) Ostia	26 February 2012
(3)	Sofiia Yaremchuk	1994	1:08:49	(Italy) Rome	5 March 2023
(9)	Rosanna Munerotto	1962	1:09:38	(United Kingdom) South Shields	20 September 1992

=== Marathon ===
Men

#	Athlete	Born	Performance	Venue	Date
1	Iliass Aouani	1995	2:04:26	(Japan) Tokyo	1 March 2026
2	Yemaneberhan Crippa	1996	2:05:18	(France) Paris	12 April 2026
3	Yohanes Chiappinelli	1997	2:05:24	(Spain) Valencia	1 December 2024
4	Pietro Riva	1997	2:06:46	(Netherlands) Rotterdam	12 April 2026
5	Eyob Faniel	1992	2:07:09	(Spain) Seville	18 February 2024
6	Stefano Baldini	1971	2:07:22	(United Kingdom) London	23 April 2006
7	Nekagenet Crippa	1994	2:07:35	(Spain) Valencia	3 December 2023
8	Daniele Meucci	1985	2:07:49	(Spain) Seville	18 February 2024
9	Giacomo Leone	1971	2:07:52	(Japan) Ōtsu	4 March 2001
10	Alberico Di Cecco	1974	2:08:02	(Italy) Rome	13 March 2005

Women

#	Athlete	Born	Performance	Venue	Date
1	Sofiia Yaremchuk	1994	2:23:14	(United Kingdom) London	27 April 2025
2	Valeria Straneo	1976	2:23:44	(Netherlands) Rotterdam	15 April 2012
3	Giovanna Epis	1988	2:23:46	(Germany) Hamburg	23 April 2023
4	Maura Viceconte	1967	2:23:47	(Austria) Vienna	21 May 2000
5	Sara Dossena	1984	2:24:00	(Japan) Nagoya	10 March 2019
6	Elisa Palmero	1999	2:24:10	(Spain) Seville	15 February 2026
7	Franca Fiacconi	1965	2:25:17	(United States) New York City	1 November 1998
8	Bruna Genovese	1976	2:25:28	(United States) Boston	17 April 2006
9	Anna Incerti	1980	2:25:32	(Germany) Berlin	25 September 2011
10	Maria Guida	1966	2:25:57	(Italy) Carpi	10 October 1999

=== 20 km walk ===
Men

#	Athlete	Born	Performance	Venue	Date
1	Massimo Stano	1992	1:17:26	(China) Taicang	March 2024
2	Francesco Fortunato	1994	1:18:16	(Czech Republic) Poděbrady	18 May 2025
3	Alex Schwazer	1984	1:18:24	(Switzerland) Lugano	14 March 2010
4	Andrea Cosi	2001	1:18:43	(Czech Republic) Poděbrady	18 May 2025
5	Maurizio Damilano	1957	1:18:54	(Spain) A Coruña	6 June 1992
6	Ivano Brugnetti	1976	1:19:36	(United Kingdom) Leamington	20 May 2007
7	Giorgio Rubino	1986	1:19:37	(Portugal) Rio Maior	4 April 2009
8	Marco Giungi	1974	1:19:49	(Italy) Grosseto	7 April 2002
9	Matteo Giupponi	1988	1:19:58	(Czech Republic) Poděbrady	10 October 2020
10	Michele Didoni	1974	1:19:59	(Sweden) Gothenburg	6 August 1995

Women

#	Athlete	Born	Performance	Venue	Date
1	Eleonora Giorgi	1989	1:26:17	(Spain) Murcia	17 May 2015
2	Antonella Palmisano	1991	1.26:36	(United Kingdom) London	13 August 2017
3	Elisabetta Perrone	1968	1:27:09	(Slovakia) Dudince	19 May 2001
4	Elisa Rigaudo	1980	1:27:12	(China) Beijing	21 August 2008
5	Erica Alfridi	1968	1:27:29	(Slovakia) Dudince	19 May 2001
6	Valentina Trapletti	1985	1:28:37	(Italy) Rome	7 June 2024
7	Annarita Sidoti	1969	1:28:38	(Germany) Eisenhüttenstadt	17 June 2000
8	Nicole Colombi	1995	1:28:51	(Slovakia) Dudince	22 March 2025
9	Alexandrina Mihai	2003	1:28:57	(Italy) Sant'Alessio Siculo	30 March 2025
10	Rossella Giordano	1972	1:29:12	(Italy) Cassino	9 March 1997

=== Half marathon race walk ===
Men

#	Athlete	Born	Performance	Venue	Date
1	Francesco Fortunato	1994	1:23:00	(Czech Republic) Poděbrady	8 May 2026
2	Andrea Cosi	2001	1:23:49	(United Kingdom) Birmingham	15 Aug 2026
3	Riccardo Orsoni	2000	1:24:30	(Italy) Alessandria	8 Mar 2026
4	Massimo Stano	1992	1:25:15	(Slovakia) Borský Mikuláš	6 Jun 2026
5	Gianluca Picchiottino	1996	1:25:27	(Italy) Alessandria	8 Mar 2026
6	Gabriele Gamba	2002	1:27:32	(Czech Republic) Poděbrady	8 May 2026
7	Teodorico Caporaso	1987	1:27:50	(Spain) La Coruña	23 May 2026
8	Matteo Giupponi	1988	1:28:29	(Czech Republic) Poděbrady	8 May 2026
9	Emiliano Brigante	2003	1:28:39	(Spain) La Coruña	23 May 2026
10	Giuseppe Disabato	2006	1:28:47	(Spain) La Coruña	23 May 2026

Women

#	Athlete	Born	Performance	Venue	Date
1	Alexandrina Mihai	2003	1:31:04	(United Kingdom) Birmingham	15 Aug 2026
2	Antonella Palmisano	1991	1:32:10	(United Kingdom) Birmingham	15 Aug 2026
3	Sofia Fiorini	2004	1:32:36	(Spain) La Coruña	23 May 2026
4	Nicole Colombi	1995	1:35:36	(United Kingdom) Birmingham	15 Aug 2026
5	Michelle Cantò	2005	1:37:28	(Spain) La Coruña	23 May 2026
6	Giada Traina	2004	1:37:45	(Czech Republic) Poděbrady	8 May 2026
7	Elisa Marini	2006	1:38:00	(Czech Republic) Poděbrady	8 May 2026
8	Giulia Gabriele	2005	1:38:16	(Germany) Zittau	25 Oct 2025
9	Martina Sciannamea	2005	1:43:18	(Spain) La Coruña	23 May 2026
10	Giulia Miconi	2000	1:46:14	(Italy) Alessandria	8 Mar 2026

=== 35 km walk ===
Men

#	Athlete	Born	Performance	Venue	Date
1	Massimo Stano	1992	2:20:43	(Czech Republic) Poděbrady	18 May 2025
2	Riccardo Orsoni	2000	2:26:09	(Czech Republic) Poděbrady	18 May 2025
3	Alex Schwazer	1984	2:26:16	(Italy) Montalto di Castro	24 January 2010
4	Matteo Giupponi	1988	2:27:18	(Slovakia) Dudince	22 March 2025
5	Teodorico Caporaso	1987	2:28:51	(Slovakia) Dudince	22 March 2025
6	Marco De Luca	1981	2:28:53	(Italy) Montalto di Castro	24 January 2010
7	Andrea Agrusti	1995	2:30:16	(Czech Republic) Poděbrady	21 May 2023
8	Giorgio Rubino	1986	2:30:50	(Italy) Grosseto	28 January 2018
9	Aldo Andrei	2001	2:30:52	(Italy) Acquaviva delle Fonti	26 January 2025
10	Gianluca Picchiottino	1996	2:31:13	(Italy) Acquaviva delle Fonti	26 January 2025

Women

#	Athlete	Born	Performance	Venue	Date
1	Antonella Palmisano	1991	2:39:35	(Czech Republic) Poděbrady	18 May 2025
2	Nicole Colombi	1995	2:41:47	(Czech Republic) Poděbrady	18 May 2025
3	Eleonora Giorgi	1989	2:41:54	(Turkey) Aksu	22 February 2025
4	Federica Curiazzi	1992	2:45:33	(Italy) Acquaviva delle Fonti	26 January 2025
5	Alexandrina Mihai	1998	2:46:41	(Italy) Acquaviva delle Fonti	26 January 2025
6	Lidia Barcella	1997	2:51:50	(Czech Republic) Poděbrady	16 May 2021
7	Sara Vitiello	1996	2:54:06	(Italy) Milazzo	29 January 2023
8	Sofia Fiorini	2004	2:54:42	(Italy) Acquaviva delle Fonti	26 January 2025
9	Beatrice Foresti	1998	3:04:04	(Czech Republic) Poděbrady	16 May 2021
10	Vittoria Giordani	2000	3:04:42	(Italy) Pescara	16 January 2022

=== Marathon race walk ===
Men

#	Athlete	Born	Performance	Venue	Date
1	Massimo Stano	1992	2:56:49	(United Kingdom) Birmingham	15 Aug 2026
2	Riccardo Orsoni	2000	3:00:44	(United Kingdom) Birmingham	15 Aug 2026
3	Alex Schwazer	1984	3:01:55	(Germany) Kelsterbach	26 Apr 2026
4	Andrea Agrusti	1995	3:03:55	(Germany) Zittau	25 Oct 2025
5	Aldo Andrei	2001	3:17:35	(Brazil) Brasília	12 Apr 2026
7	Stefano Chiesa	1996	3:20:02	(Italy) Acquaviva delle Fonti	25 Jan 2026

Women

#	Athlete	Born	Performance	Venue	Date
1	Sofia Fiorini	2004	3:15:11	(United Kingdom) Birmingham	15 Aug 2026
2	Federica Curiazzi	1992	3:32:21	(Brazil) Brasília	12 Apr 2026
3	Eleonora Giorgi	1989	3:35:46	(Brazil) Brasília	12 Apr 2026
4	Lidia Barcella	1997	3:47:27	(Italy) Acquaviva delle Fonti	25 Jan 2026
5	Sara Vitiello	1996	3:57:24	(Italy) Acquaviva delle Fonti	25 Jan 2026

=== 50 km walk ===
Men

#	Athlete	Born	Performance	Venue	Date
1	Alex Schwazer	1984	3:36:04	(Italy) Rosignano Marittimo	11 February 2007
2	Giovanni Perricelli	1967	3:43:55	(Finland) Helsinki	13 August 1994
3	Raffaello Ducceschi	1962	3:44:27	(Italy) Molfetta	17 April 1988
4	Marco De Luca	1981	3:44:47	(Italy) Rome	8 May 2016
5	Arturo Di Mezza	1969	3:44:52	(United States) Atlanta	2 August 1996
6	Marco Giungi	1974	3:45:55	(Italy) Vittorio Veneto	3 March 2002
7	Maurizio Damilano	1957	3:46:51	(Italy) Pomigliano	25 March 1990
8	Ivano Brugnetti	1976	3:47:54	(Spain) Seville	25 August 1999
9	Giovanni De Benedictis	1968	3:48:06	(Italy) Vittorio Veneto	3 March 2002
10	Sandro Bellucci	1955	3:48:08	(Italy) Molfetta	17 April 1988

Women

#	Athlete	Born	Performance	Venue	Date
1	Eleonora Giorgi	1989	4:04:50	(Lithuania) Alytus	19 May 2019
2	Mariavittoria Becchetti	1994	4:26:10	(Lithuania) Alytus	19 May 2019
3	Nicole Colombi	1995	4:27:38	(Italy) Gioiosa Marea	27 January 2019
4	Natalia Bruniko	1973	4:29:56	(Italy) Scanzorosciate	27 October 2002
5	Federica Curiazzi	1992	4:30:17	(Lithuania) Alytus	19 May 2019

=== High jump ===
Men

#	Athlete	Born	Performance	Venue	Date
1	Gianmarco Tamberi	1992	2.39 m	Monaco	15 Jul 2016
2	Marco Fassinotti	1989	2.35 m (i)	(Slovakia) Banská Bystrica	4 Feb 2016
3	Stefano Sottile	1998	2.34 m	(France) Paris	10 Aug 2024
4	Marcello Benvenuti	1964	2.33 m	(Italy) Verona	12 Sep 1989
4	Silvano Chesani	1988	2.33 m (i)	(Italy) Ancona	17 Feb 2013
6	Luca Toso	1964	2.32 m	(Italy) Turin	21 Jul 1988
6	Alessandro Talotti	1980	2.32 m (i)	(United Kingdom) Glasgow	29 Jan 2005
8	Andrea Bettinelli	1978	2.31 m	(Italy) Rieti	3 Aug 2003
8	Nicola Ciotti	1976	2.31 m (i)	(Czech Republic) Hustopeče	21 Jan 2006
8	Giulio Ciotti	1976	2.31 m (i)	(Czech Republic) Hustopeče	21 Jan 2006

Women

#	Athlete	Born	Performance	Venue	Date
1	Antonietta Di Martino	1978	2.04 m (i)	(Slovakia) Banská Bystrica	9 Feb 2011
2	Elena Vallortigara	1991	2.02 m	(United Kingdom) London	22 Jul 2018
3	Sara Simeoni	1953	2.01 m	(Italy) Brescia	4 Aug 1978
4	Alessia Trost	1993	2.00 m (i)	(Czech Republic) Třinec	29 Jan 2013
5	Antonella Bevilacqua	1971	1.98 m	(Greece) Athens	28 Feb 1994
6	Desirée Rossit	1994	1.97 m	(Italy) Bressanone	10 Jun 2016
7	Francesca Bradamante	1973	1.95 m	(Italy) Udine	23 May 1998
7	Raffaella Lamera	1983	1.95 m	(Italy) Florence	5 Jun 2010
9	Erika Furlani	1996	1.94 m	(Italy) Rieti	11 Jul 2020
10	Idea Pieroni	2002	1.93 m	(Italy) Livorno	1 Sep 2024

=== Pole vault ===
Men

#	Athlete	Born	Performance	Venue	Date
1	Giuseppe Gibilisco	1979	5.90 m	(France) Paris	28 Aug 2003
2	Claudio Stecchi	1991	5.82 m	(Italy) Chiari	8 Sep 2020
3	Fabio Pizzolato	1975	5.75 m	(Italy) Milan	6 Jul 1995
4	Matteo Oliveri	2002	5.71 m	(Italy) Lucca	8 Jun 2025
5	Gianni Iapichino	1969	5.70 m	(Italy) Sestriere	31 Jul 1994
5	Maurilio Mariani	1973	5.70 m	(Italy) Padova	26 Jun 1999
5	Simone Bertelli	2004	5.70 m	(Norway) Bergen	19 Jul 2025
8	Marco Andreini	1961	5.68 m	(Italy) Siderno	23 Sep 1990
9	Andrea Pegoraro	1966	5.65 m	(Italy) Foggia	18 Jun 1992
9	Andrea Giannini	1976	5.65 m	(Italy) Milan	6 Jun 1997
9	Alberto Giacchetto	1973	5.65 m (i)	(Italy) Castellanza	24 Feb 1998

Women

#	Athlete	Born	Performance	Venue	Date
1	Roberta Bruni	1994	4.73 m	(Italy) Chiari	4 Sep 2023
2	Elisa Molinarolo	1994	4.70 m	(France) Paris	7 Aug 2024
3	Anna Giordano Bruno	1980	4.60 m	(Italy) Milan	2 Aug 2009
4	Sonia Malavisi	1994	4.52 m	(Italy) Nembro	19 Jul 2024
5	Virginia Scardanzan	1998	4.45 m	(Italy) Chiari	4 Sep 2023
5	Great Nnachi	2004	4.45 m (i)	(Italy) Ancona	17 Feb 2024
7	Arianna Farfaletti Casali	1976	4.42 m	(Italy) Busto Arsizio	21 Sep 2008
7	Helen Falda	1996	4.42 m	(United States) Vermillion	16 Apr 2021
7	Giulia Valletti Borgnini	2001	4.42 m (i)	(Italy) Ancona	18 Feb 2023
10	Maria Roberta Gherca	2000	4.41 m	(Slovenia) Novo Mesto	15 Jun 2024

=== Long jump ===
Men

#	Athlete	Born	Performance	Venue	Date
1	Andrew Howe	1985	8.47 m	(Japan) Osaka	30 Aug 2007
2	Giovanni Evangelisti	1961	8.43 m	(Italy) San Giovanni V.	16 May 1987
2	Mattia Furlani	2005	8.43 m	(China) Shaoxing	16 May 2026
4	Francesco Inzoli	2005	8.27 m	(Italy) Florence	26 Jul 2026
5	Simone Bianchi	1963	8.25 m	(Spain) Madrid	1 Jun 1996
6	Nicola Trentin	1974	8.20 m	(Italy) Padua	6 Jul 2003
6	Kevin Ojiaku	1989	8.20 m	(Italy) Turin	21 May 2017
8	Stefano Dacastello	1980	8.17 m	(Italy) Florence	10 Jul 2004
9	Paolo Camossi	1974	8.16 m	(Italy) Padua	7 Jun 1998
10	Fausto Frigerio	1966	8.15 m	(Italy) Cagliari	5 Jul 1990
10	Daniele Inzoli	2008	8.15 m	(United States) Eugene	7 Aug 2026

Women

#	Athlete	Born	Performance	Venue	Date
1	Larissa Iapichino	2002	7.12 m	(United States) Eugene	4 Jul 2026
2	Fiona May	1969	7.11 m	(Hungary) Budapest	22 Aug 1998
3	Valentina Uccheddu	1966	6.80 m	(Italy) Sestriere	31 Jul 1994
4	Laura Strati	1990	6.72 m	(Spain) Ávila	15 Jul 2017
4	Antonella Capriotti	1962	6.72 m (i)	(Italy) Florence	24 Feb 1988
6	Tania Vicenzino	1986	6.68 m (i)	(United Kingdom) Glasgow	2 Mar 2019
7	Dariya Derkach	1993	6.67 m	(Italy) Rieti	15 Jun 2013
7	Magdelín Martínez	1976	6.67 m	(Italy) Rieti	5 Sep 2004
9	Valeria Canella	1982	6.56 m	(Italy) Pergine V.	7 Jul 2007
10	Maria Chiara Baccini	1981	6.55 m	(France) Annecy	31 Jul 1998
10	Arianna Battistella	2002	6.55 m	(Italy) Grosseto	13 Jun 2021

=== Triple jump ===
Men

#	Athlete	Born	Performance	Venue	Date
1	Andy Díaz	1995	18.15 m	(United Kingdom) Birmingham	15 Aug 2026
2	Fabrizio Donato	1976	17.73 m (i)	(France) Paris	6 Mar 2011
3	Daniele Greco	1989	17.70 m (i)	(Sweden) Gothenburg	3 Mar 2013
4	Andrea Dallavalle	1999	17.64 m	(Japan) Tokyo	19 Sep 2025
5	Paolo Camossi	1974	17.45 m	(Italy) Milan	7 Jun 2000
6	Simone Biasutti	1999	17.32 m	(Italy) Florence	25 Jul 2026
7	Emmanuel Ihemeje	1998	17.29 m	(United States) Walnut	15 Apr 2023
8	Fabrizio Schembri	1981	17.27 m	(Italy) Turin	4 Jun 2009
9	Tobia Bocchi	1997	17.26 m	(Spain) Castellón	14 Jun 2023
10	Giuseppe Gentile	1943	17.22 m	Mexico City	14 Oct 1968

Women

#	Athlete	Born	Performance	Venue	Date
1	Magdelín Martínez	1976	15.03 m	(Italy) Rome	26 Jun 2004
2	Simona La Mantia	1983	14.69 m	(Italy) Palermo	22 May 2005
3	Fiona May	1969	14.65 m	(Russia) Saint Petersburg	27 Jun 1998
4	Dariya Derkach	1993	14.60 m	(United Kingdom) Birmingham	13 Aug 2026
5	Erika Saraceni	2006	14.50 m	(United Kingdom) Birmingham	10 Aug 2026
6	Barbara Lah	1972	14.38 m	(France) Paris	26 Aug 2003
7	Maria Costanza Moroni	1969	14.25 m	(Italy) Formia	12 Jul 1998
8	Ottavia Cestonaro	1995	14.22 m	(Spain) Madrid	8 Jun 2022
9	Antonella Capriotti	1962	14.18 m	(Germany) Stuttgart	21 Aug 1993
10	Silvia Biondini	1974	14.15 m	(Italy) Catania	7 Jul 2001

=== Shot put ===
Men

#	Athlete	Born	Performance	Venue	Date
1	Leonardo Fabbri	1997	22.98 m	(Belgium) Brussels	14 Sep 2024
2	Alessandro Andrei	1959	22.91 m	(Italy) Viareggio	12 Aug 1987
3	Zane Weir	1995	22.44 m	(Italy) Padua	3 Sep 2023
4	Nick Ponzio	1995	21.83 m	(Portugal) Leiria	13 Mar 2022
5	Paolo Dal Soglio	1970	21.23 m	(Italy) Grosseto	11 Sep 1996
6	Riccardo Ferrara	2001	20.98 m	(Italy) Pergine Valsugana	6 Jul 2024
7	Marco Montelatici	1953	20.90 m	(Italy) Milan	26 May 1985
8	Corrado Fantini	1967	20.78 m	(Italy) Rieti	1 Sep 1996
9	Luciano Zerbini	1960	20.54 m	(Italy) Parma	23 Jul 1992
10	Sebastiano Bianchetti	1996	20.41 m	(Italy) Spoleto	22 Jul 2022

Women

#	Athlete	Born	Performance	Venue	Date
1	Assunta Legnante	1978	19.20 m (i)	(Italy) Genoa	16 Feb 2002
2	Chiara Rosa	1983	19.15 m	(Italy) Milan	19 Jun 2007
3	Mara Rosolen	1965	18.89 m (i)	(Italy) Castellanza	16 Feb 1997
4	Cinzia Petrucci	1955	18.74 m	(Italy) Florence	4 Jun 1980
5	Cristiana Checchi	1977	18.64 m (i)	(Italy) Schio	13 Feb 2003
6	Julaika Nicoletti	1988	17.97 m (i)	(Italy) Ancona	27 Jan 2015
7	Agnese Maffeis	1965	17.76 m	(Italy) Milan	9 Jun 1998
8	Maria Assunta Chiummariello	1958	17.74 m	(Italy) Imola	12 Oct 1986
9	Maria Tranchina	1968	17.04 m (i)	(Italy) Schio	6 Feb 1995
10	Sara Verteramo	2002	16.94 m	(Italy) Novara	18 Jul 2026

=== Discus throw ===
Men

#	Athlete	Born	Performance	Venue	Date
1	Marco Martino	1960	67.62 m	(Italy) Spoleto	28 May 1989
2	Giovanni Faloci	1985	67.36 m	(Italy) Spoleto	29 Jun 2021
3	Marco Bucci	1960	66.96 m	(Italy) Formia	30 Jun 1984
4	Alessio Mannucci	1998	65.60 m	(United States) Ramona	10 Apr 2025
5	Silvano Simeon	1945	65.10 m	(Italy) Rome	27 May 1976
6	Hannes Kirchler	1978	65.01 m	(Italy) Bolzano	4 Jun 2007
7	Nazzareno Di Marco	1985	64.93 m	(Italy) Latina	6 Jul 2019
8	Diego Fortuna	1968	64.69 m	(Italy) Ravenna	24 Jun 2000
9	Cristiano Andrei	1973	64.49 m	(Italy) Lucca	6 May 2003
10	Armando De Vincentiis	1943	64.48 m	(Italy) Rome	27 May 1976

Women

#	Athlete	Born	Performance	Venue	Date
1	Daisy Osakue	1996	64.68 m	(France) Castres	14 Jun 2026
2	Agnese Maffeis	1965	63.66 m	(Italy) Milan	12 Jun 1996
3	Stefania Strumillo	1989	59.80 m	(Netherlands) Amsterdam	6 Jul 2016
4	Cristiana Checchi	1977	59.74 m	(Italy) Milan	23 Jun 2007
5	Tamara Apostolico	1989	59.50 m	(Croatia) Split	15 May 2012
6	Laura Bordignon	1981	59.21 m	(Italy) San Benedetto	24 Feb 2008
7	Valentina Aniballi	1984	59.12 m	(Italy) Tarquinia	13 Jun 2018
8	Benedetta Benedetti	2003	58.17 m	(Italy) Mariano Comense	1 Mar 2026
9	Maria Stella Masocco	1948	57.54 m	(Italy) Tirrenia	14 May 1972
9	Maria Marello	1961	57.54 m	(Italy) Verona	19 Jun 1986

=== Hammer throw ===
Men

#	Athlete	Born	Performance	Venue	Date
1	Enrico Sgrulletti	1965	81.64 m	(Italy) Ostia	9 Mar 1997
2	Loris Paoluzzi	1974	80.98 m	(Italy) Pescara	4 Jul 1999
3	Nicola Vizzoni	1973	80.50 m	(Italy) Formia	14 Jul 2001
4	Marco Lingua	1978	79.97 m	(Poland) Bydgoszcz	1 Jul 2008
5	Lorenzo Povegliano	1984	79.08 m	(Italy) Codroipo	12 May 2012
6	Giampaolo Urlando	1945	78.16 m	(United States) Walnut	25 Jul 1984
7	Lucio Serrani	1961	78.02 m	(Italy) Milan	6 Sep 1988
8	Orlando Bianchini	1955	77.94 m	(Italy) Milan	27 Jun 1984
9	Giuliano Zanello	1963	77.48 m	(Italy) Mereto	25 May 1986
10	Simone Falloni	1991	76.33 m	(Italy) Rieti	23 Apr 2021

Women

#	Athlete	Born	Performance	Venue	Date
1	Sara Fantini	1997	75.77 m	(Spain) Madrid	18 Jun 2022
2	Ester Balassini	1977	73.59 m	(Italy) Brixen	25 Jun 2005
3	Clarissa Claretti	1980	72.46 m	(Italy) Cagliari	19 Jul 2008
4	Silvia Salis	1985	71.93 m	(Italy) Savona	18 May 2011
5	Rachele Mori	2003	69.04 m	(Italy) La Spezia	30 Jun 2024
6	Elisa Palmieri	1983	67.33 m	(Italy) Turin	25 Jun 2011
7	Laura Gibilisco	1986	66.90 m	(Italy) Siracusa	5 Apr 2008
8	Cecilia Desideri	1999	66.72 m	(Italy) Lucca	28 May 2022
9	Nadia Maffo	1996	66.56 m	(United States) Fresno	29 Apr 2022
10	Micaela Mariani	1988	66.24 m	(Italy) Rovereto	19 Jul 2014

=== Javelin throw ===
Men

#	Athlete	Born	Performance	Venue	Date
1	Carlo Sonego	1972	84.60 m	(Japan) Osaka	8 May 1999
2	Giovanni Frattini	2002	83.61 m	(Italy) Modena	24 Sep 2024
3	Mauro Fraresso	1993	81.79 m	(Italy) Lucca	24 Feb 2019
4	Roberto Bertolini	1985	81.68 m	(Italy) Nembro	7 Jul 2017
5	Francesco Pignata	1978	81.67 m	(Italy) Florence	19 Jun 2005
6	Alberto Desiderio	1973	80.80 m	(Italy) Catania	19 May 2001
7	Norbert Bonvecchio	1985	80.37 m	(Germany) Braunschweig	22 Jun 2014
8	Roberto Orlando	1996	80.35 m	(Italy) Rovereto	26 Jun 2021
9	Armin Kerer	1972	80.25 m	(Italy) Brixen	18 Sep 1999
10	Michele Fina	2002	79.95 m	(Cyprus) Nicosia	15 Mar 2026

Women

#	Athlete	Born	Performance	Venue	Date
1	Claudia Coslovich	1972	65.30 m	(Slovenia) Ljubljana	10 Jun 2000
2	Zahra Bani	1979	62.75 m	(Finland) Helsinki	14 Aug 2005
3	Elisabetta Marin	1977	61.77 m	(Italy) Gorizia	5 Jun 2004
4	Paola Padovan	1995	59.25 m^{(1)}	(Italy) Treviso	13 Apr 2025
5	Federica Botter	2001	58.72 m	(United States) Boulder	10 May 2024
6	Sara Zabarino	1999	58.62 m	(Slovakia) Šamorín	10 Mar 2019
7	Carolina Visca	2000	58.47 m	(Italy) Brixen	28 Jul 2019
8	Luisa Sinigaglia	1997	58.41 m	(Italy) Mariano Comense	16 Feb 2020
9	Sara Jemai	1992	58.19 m	(Italy) Pescara	9 Sep 2018
10	Adele Toniutto	2001	57.45 m	(France) Strasbourg	6 Jun 2026

(1) Not approved by World Athletics as it was obtained in a regional competition.

=== Decathlon/Heptathlon ===
Men

#	Athlete	Born	Performance	Venue	Date
1	Dario Dester	2000	8,318	(Germany) Ratingen	28 Jun 2026
2	Beniamino Poserina	1970	8,169	(Italy) Formia	6 Oct 1996
3	Lorenzo Naidon	1999	8,090	(Italy) Molfetta	30 Jul 2023
4	Paolo Casarsa	1975	8,056	(Austria) Vienna	6 Jun 2004
5	Alberto Nonino	2004	7,988	(Italy) Molfetta	11 Jul 2026
6	William Frullani	1979	7,984	(Austria) Götzis	2 Jun 2002
7	Simone Cairoli	1990	7,949	(Germany) Berlin	8 Aug 2018
8	Ubaldo Ranzi	1970	7,930	(Italy) Formia	6 Oct 1996
9	Marzio Viti	1973	7,861	(Italy) Viareggio	20 Jul 2002
10	Luciano Asta	1969	7,824	(Italy) Desenzano	18 May 1997

Women

#	Athlete	Born	Performance	Venue	Date
1	Sveva Gerevini	1996	6,413	(Austria) Götzis	31 May 2026
2	Gertrud Bacher	1971	6,185	(Italy) Desenzano	9 May 1999
3	Giuliana Spada	1971	6,135	(Italy) Cesano Maderno	28 May 1995
4	Karin Periginelli	1970	6,059	(Italy) Bologna	26 May 1996
5	Ifeoma Ozoeze	1971	6,056	(Japan) Tokyo	27 Aug 1991
6	Francesca Doveri	1982	5,988	(Italy) Desenzano	8 May 2011
7	Corinne Schneider	1962	5,957	(Germany) Duisburg	29 Aug 1989
8	Silvia Dalla Piana	1975	5,920	(Italy) Desenzano	25 Jul 2004
9	Elisa Trevisan	1980	5,844	(Italy) Desenzano	25 Jul 2004
10	Alessandra Becatti	1965	5,785	(Austria) Götzis	24 May 1987

=== 4 × 100 metres relay ===
Men

#	Team	Time	Venue	Date
1	Patta, Jacobs, Desalu, Tortu	37.50	(Japan) Tokyo	6 Aug 2021
2	Rigali, Jacobs, Patta, Tortu	37.62	(Hungary) Budapest	26 Aug 2023
3	Rigali, Jacobs, Patta, Tortu	37.65	(Hungary) Budapest	25 Aug 2023
4	Melluzzo, Jacobs, Patta, Tortu	37.68	(France) Paris	9 Aug 2024
5	Melluzzo, Jacobs, Patta, Tortu	37.82	(Italy) Rome	12 Jun 2024
6	Patta, Jacobs, Desalu, Tortu	37.95	(Japan) Tokyo	5 Aug 2021
7	Rigali, Tortu, Patta, Ceccarelli	38.04	(Italy) Grosseto	21 Jul 2023
4	Melluzzo, Jacobs, Desalu, Tortu	38.07	(France) Paris	8 Aug 2024
9	Cattaneo, Jacobs, Manenti, Tortu	38.11	(Qatar) Doha	4 Oct 2019
10	Rigali, Patta, Jacobs, Tortu	38.14	(The Bahamas) Nassau	5 May 2024

Women

#	Team	Time	Venue	Date
1	Dosso, Kaddari, Bongiorni, Pavese	42.14	(Hungary) Budapest	25 Aug 2023
2	Pagliarini, Hooper, Kaddari, Pavese	42.22	(United Kingdom) Birmingham	15 Aug 2026
3	Dosso, Kaddari, Bongiorni, Pavese	42.49	(Hungary) Budapest	26 Aug 2023
4	Fontana, Hooper, Kaddari, Dosso	42.58	(Spain) Madrid	28 Jun 2025
5	Dosso, Kaddari, Siragusa, De Masi	42.60	(The Bahamas) Nassau	5 May 2024
6	Pagliarini, Hooper, Kaddari, Pavese	42.61	(Botswana) Gaborone	3 May 2026
7	Dosso, Kaddari, Bongiorni, Fontana	42.71	(United States) Eugene	22 Jul 2022
8	Siragusa, Hooper, Bongiorni, Fontana	42.84	(Japan) Tokyo	5 Aug 2021
8	Dosso, Kaddari, Bongiorni, Pavese	42.84	(Germany) Munich	21 Aug 2022
10	Herrera, Hooper, Bongiorni, Siragusa	42.90	(Qatar) Doha	4 Oct 2019

=== 4 × 400 metres relay ===
Men

#	Team	Time	Venue	Date
1	Scotti, Sito, Soudassi, Benati	2:58.10	(United Kingdom) Birmingham	14 Aug 2026
2	Re, Aceti, Scotti, Sibilio	2:58.81	(Japan) Tokyo	7 Aug 2021
3	Sibilio, Aceti, Scotti, Re	2:58.91	(Japan) Tokyo	6 Aug 2021
4	Scotti, Sito, Soudassi, Benati	2:59.16	(United Kingdom) Birmingham	16 Aug 2026
5	Sito, Aceti, Scotti, Sibilio	2:59.72	(France) Paris	10 Aug 2024
6	Re, Scotti, Benati, Sibilio	3:00.14	(Hungary) Budapest	26 Aug 2023
7	Sito, Aceti, Sibilio, Scotti	3:00.26	(France) Paris	9 Aug 2024
8	Sito, Aceti, Meli, Scotti	3:00.81	(Italy) Rome	12 Jun 2024
9	Scotti, Meli, Benati, Re	3:01.23	(Hungary) Budapest	26 Aug 2023
10	Bongiorni, Zuliani, Petrella, Ribaud	3:01.37	(West Germany) Stuttgart	31 Aug 1986

Women

#	Team	Time	Venue	Date
1	Accame, Trevisan, Polinari, Mangione	3:23.40	(Italy) Rome	12 Jun 2024
1	Borga, Troiani, Bonora, Mangione	3:23.40	(Botswana) Gaborone	3 May 2026
3	Bonora, Polinari, Mangione, Coiro	3:23.57	(United Kingdom) Birmingham	16 Aug 2026
4	Mangione, Folorunso, Bonora, Trevisan	3:23.86	(Hungary) Budapest	26 Aug 2023
5	Borga, Troiani, Bonora, Mangione	3:24.46	(Botswana) Gaborone	2 May 2026
6	Polinari, Troiani, Bonora, Mangione	3:24.71	(Japan) Tokyo	20 Sep 2025
7	Mangione, Polinari, Bonora, Trevisan	3:24.98	(Hungary) Budapest	27 Aug 2023
8	Polinari, Troiani, Coiro, Mangione	3:25.00	(Japan) Tokyo	21 Sep 2025
9	Chigbolu, Spacca, Folorunso, Grenot	3:25.16	(Brazil) Rio de Janeiro	19 Aug 2016
10	Accame, Trevisan, Borga, Polinari	3:25.28	(Italy) Rome	11 Jun 2024

=== Mixed 4 × 400 metres relay ===
#	Team	Time	Venue	Date
1	Scotti, Troiani, Aceti, Mangione	3:09.66	(Spain) Madrid	29 Jun 2025
2	Benati, Polinari, Aceti, Coiro	3:10.52	(Botswana) Gaborone	3 May 2026
3	Benati, Polinari, Aceti, Coiro	3:10.60	(Botswana) Gaborone	2 May 2026
4	Sito, Polinari, Scotti, Mangione	3:10.69	(Italy) Rome	7 Jun 2024
5	Scotti, Polinari, Aceti, Mangione	3:11.20	(Japan) Tokyo	13 Sep 2025
6	Sito, Polinari, Scotti, Mangione	3:11.59	(France) Paris	2 Aug 2024
7	Sito, Trevisan, Scotti, Mangione	3:11.84	(France) Paris	3 Aug 2024
8	Scotti, Troiani, Aceti, Mangione	3:12.53	(China) Guangzhou	11 May 2025
9	Soudassi, Polinari, Sito, Mangione	3:13.12	(United Kingdom) Birmingham	10 Aug 2026
10	Scotti, Mangione, Borga, Aceti	3:13.51	(Japan) Tokyo	30 Jul 2021

=== Mixed 4 × 100 metres relay ===
#	Team	Time	Venue	Date
1	Tardioli, Valensin, Bernardi, Dosso	40.69	(Botswana) Gaborone	3 May 2026
2	Tardioli, Valensin, Bernardi, Siragusa	40.96	(Botswana) Gaborone	2 May 2026
3	Marek, Kaddari, Cappelletti, Pagliarini	40.98	(Italy) Taranto	2 Sep 2026
4	Randazzo, Pavese, Ianes, Hooper	41.04	(France) Paris	28 Jun 2026
5	Pagliarini, Bertello, Federici, Ceccarelli	41.15	(China) Guangzhou	10 May 2025
6	Galvan, Valensin, Pagliarini, Doualla	41.21	(United States) Eugene	8 Aug 2026
7	Melon, Bertello, Rigali, Baffour	41.25	(China) Guangzhou	11 May 2025
8	Galvan, Calzolari, Pagliarini, Suppini	41.74	(United States) Eugene	6 Aug 2026
9	Pratali, Calzolari, Pagliarini, Doualla	41.75	(Italy) Rome	5 Jun 2026

== See also ==
- Federazione Italiana di Atletica Leggera
- Italy national athletics team
- Naturalized athletes of Italy
- Italian records in athletics
- Italian Athletics Championships
