= Savannah Morgan =

British athlete

Personal information
- Nationality: British
- Born: Savannah McKenzie Morgan; 21 October 2007 (age 18)

Sport
- Sport: Athletics
- Event: Sprint

Achievements and titles
- Personal best: 100m: 11.53 (2026)
Medal record
Women's athletics
Representing Great Britain
World U20 Championships
Silver medal – second place	2026 Eugene	4x100 m mixed

Savannah McKenzie Morgan (born 21 October 2007) is a British sprinter.

== Biography ==
From Dallington, Northamptonshire, Morgan trained at Northampton Athletics Club and showed aptitude for sprinting from a young age, breaking UK sprint records in the 10 and 11 years-old age-groups. Having ran 8.50 seconds for the 60 metres as a ten year-old she was used in an advertising campaign by the sportswear brand Nike in 2018.

In June 2026, she was part of a British mixed sprint relay team which set a new U20 British record of 42.21 seconds at the Mannheim International Gala, alongside Joel Masters, Ava Freeman and Mathew Ajayi. On 6 August, she was part of a Great Britain 4 x 100 metres mixed relay team alongside Ajayi, Sophie Thomas and Divine Iheme who set a world under-20 record of 41.60 seconds in heat two at the 2026 World Athletics U20 Championships. In the final, she ran as the Great Britain team lowered their time to 41.38 seconds and won the silver medal, finishing behind a new world-record setting Italian quartet led home by Kelly Doualla.

== Personal life ==
Morgan is the sister of international runner Corinne Humphreys.
