= Mathew Ajayi =

British athlete (born 2007)

Personal information
- Nationality: British
- Born: 18 January 2007 (age 19)

Sport
- Sport: Athletics
- Event: Sprint

Achievements and titles
- Personal best: 100m: 10.39 (2026)
Medal record
Men's athletics
Representing Great Britain
World U20 Championships
Silver medal – second place	2026 Eugene	4x100 m mixed

Matthew Ajayi (born 18 January 2007) is a British sprinter.

== Biography ==
Ajayi was educated at Burford School in Oxfordshire and trained as a member of Watford Harriers.

In June, he was part of a British mixed sprint relay team which set a new U20 British record of 42.21 seconds at the Mannheim International Gala, alongside Joel Masters, Ava Freeman and Savannah Morgan McKenzie. On 6 August, Ajayi was part of a Great Britain 4 x 100 metres mixed relay team alongside Morgan McKenzie, Sophie Thomas, and Divine Iheme who set a world under-20 record of 41.60 seconds in heat two at the 2026 World Athletics U20 Championships. In the final, he ran as the Great Britain team lowered their time to 41.38 seconds and won the silver medal, finishing behind a new world-record setting Italian quartet led home by Kelly Doualla.
