= Sophie Thomas =

Scottish sprinter (born 2007)

Personal information
- Born: 29 October 2007 (age 19)

Sport
- Sport: Athletics
- Event: Sprint

Achievements and titles
- Personal bests: 60m: 7.33 (Sheffield, 2026); 100m: 11.32 (Birmingham, 2026); 200m: 23.10 (Birmingham, 2026)
Medal record
Women's athletics
Representing Great Britain
World U20 Championships
Silver medal – second place	2026 Eugene	4x100 m mixed

Sophie Thomas (born 29 October 2007) is a British sprinter from Scotland.

== Biography ==
From Dunfermline, Thomas is a member of Dunfermline Track and Field. She was educated at Dollar Academy in Scotland.

Thomas was part of a Scottish team which set a new national under-20 4x100m relay record at the Mannheim International in June 2025. She set an all-conditions personal best of 11.86 second for the 100 metres at the meeting. In August 2025, Thomas won double sprint gold in the Scottish U20 Championships in Aberdeen, running 11.74 seconds for the 100 metres.

Thomas set a personal best of 7.38 seconds for the 60 metres in Glasgow in January 2026, and 23.86 seconds over 200 metres indoors at the Glasgow EAP later that month. The following month, a time of 7.33 seconds set a new Scottish under-20 record at the England U20 Indoor Championships in Sheffield. The next day, she also set an U20 Scottish indoor national records for the 200 metres, with her time of 23.28 seconds only 0.1 away from Dina Asher Smith's U20 UK record. She was named in the GB & NI U20 team for the 2026 Loughborough International in May 2026, where she ran a Scottish under-20 record of 11.49 seconds in the 100 metres. That month, she was selected for the British team for the Mannheim International Gala in Germany, where she ran a Scottish U20 record in the 200 metres with a time of 23.22 seconds. She was also part of the Scottish under-20 team which set a new senior Scottish national record in the women’s 4x100m relay alongside Holly Whittaker, Emma Clark, and Cara Monachello. On 20 June, Thomas reached the final of the 100 metres at the 2026 British Championships, running a personal best of 11.44 seconds in the semi-final and 11.32 to place sixth in the final, as well as the Scottish U20 record she moved to within 0.02 seconds of the overall Scottish record of Alisha Rees. In the 200 metres the following day, she ran 23.24 second to also qualify for the final of that event, where she placed fourth overall in a new Scottish under-20 record of 23.10 seconds.

Thomas was selected as part of the Great Britain team to compete at the 2026 World Athletics U20 Championships. On 6 August, she was part of the Great Britain 4 x 100 metres mixed relay team alongside Savannah Morgan McKenzie, Divine Iheme and Mathew Ajayi who set a world under-20 record of 41.60 seconds in heat two at the World U20 Championships. In the final, she ran as the Great Britain team lowered their time to 41.38 seconds and won the silver medal, finishing behind a new world-record setting Italian quartet led home by Kelly Doualla. In October 2026, she was selected for the 2026/27 Olympic Futures Programme awarded by UK Athletics. The following month, she was named U20 Athlete of the Year by Scottish Athletics.
