= Bakr El Asri =

Spanish athlete (born 2007)

Personal information
- Born: 28 January 2007 (age 19)

Sport
- Sport: Athletics
- Event: Steeplechase

Achievements and titles
- Personal bests: 3000m S'chase: 8:24.40 (2026) EU20R
Medal record
Men's athletics
Representing ESP
World U20 Championships
Gold medal – first place	2026 Eugene	3000 m steeplechase
European U18 Championships
Gold medal – first place	2024 Banska Bystrica	2000m S'chase

Bakr El Asri (born 28 January 2007) is a Spanish steeplechaser. He set a new European under-20 record in the 3000 metres steeplechase in 2026 and won the gold medal at the 2026 World Athletics U20 Championships.

He was also previously a gold medalist in the 2000 metres steeplechase at the 2024 European Athletics U18 Championships.

== Biography ==
Born in Sant Hilari Sacalm, Catalonia, he was a keen footballer before focusing on athletics. He is a member of an athletics club in Lloret de Mar. In 2023, he ran 5:41.30 to win the U18 steeplechase at the Spanish Championships in Gijón. In 2024, he broke the Spanish under-18 5K record in Barcelona, with 14:21.

El Asri won the gold medal in the 2000 metres steeplechase at the 2024 European Athletics U18 Championships in Banská Bystrica, Slovakia. He was subsequently a prize winner at the Spanish Athletics Gala in April 2025. On 3 November, he won the U20 race at the Cross Ciutat de Castellon.

El Asri set a new European under-20 record in the 3000 metres steeplechase in June 2026 with 8:24.40 at the Vienna Track Night, breaking the record held by Jakob Ingebrigtsen for eight years. On 9 August, he won the gold medal in the 3000 metres steeplechase at the 2026 World Athletics U20 Championships in Eugene, USA. He was nominated for European Athletics Men’s Rising Star for 2026.
