= Alessia Pavese =

Italian sprinter

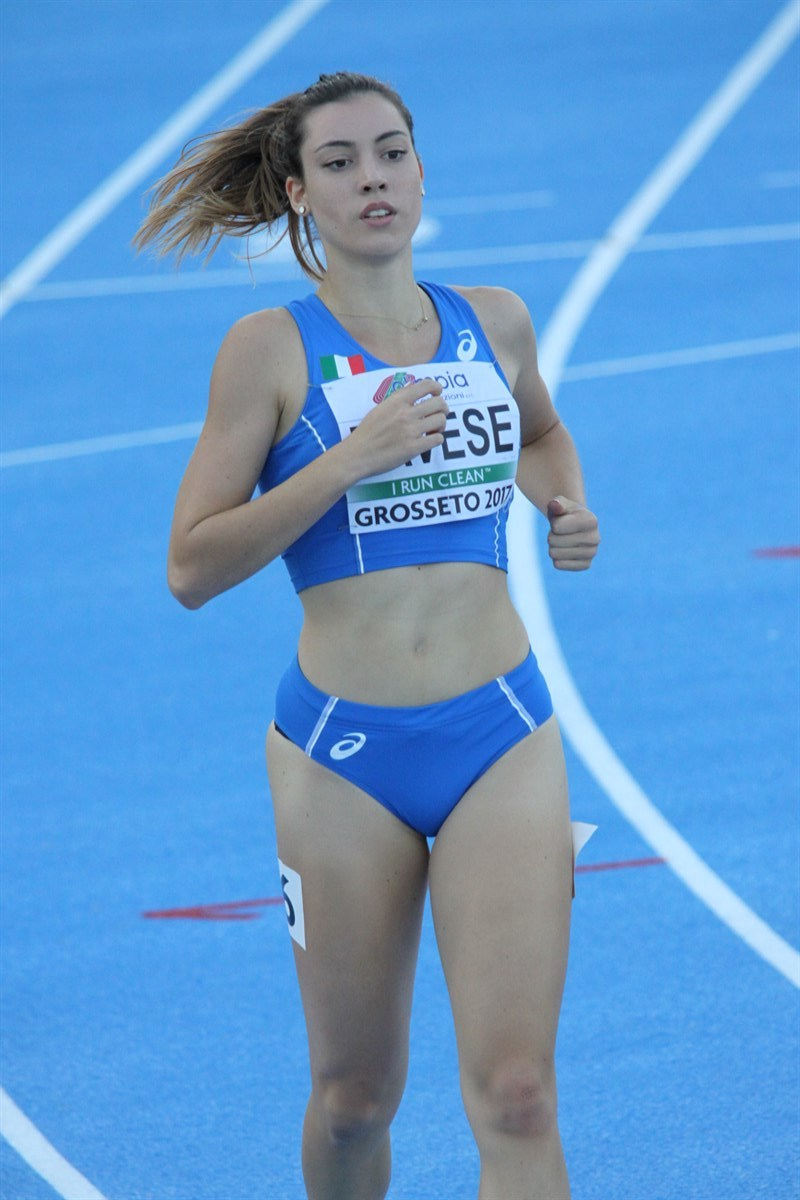
- Pavese in 2017.

Personal information
- National team: Italy
- Born: 15 July 1998 (age 28) Alzano Lombardo, Italy
- Height: 1.80 m (5 ft 11 in)
- Weight: 60 kg (132 lb)

Sport
- Sport: Athletics
- Event: Sprinting
- Club: G.S. Aeronautica Militare
- Coached by: Alberto Barbera

Achievements and titles
- Personal bests: 100 m: 11.35 (2023); 200 m: 23.51 (2019)
Medal record
European Championships
| Bronze medal – third place | 2022 Munich | 4×100 m relay |

Alessia Pavese (born 15 July 1998) is an Italian sprinter bronze medal at the 2022 European Athletics Championships with the relay team.

== Career ==
Pavese in her career at youth level in the 200 metres was 6th at the 2015 World Youth Championships in Athletics in Cali, eliminated in heats at the 2017 European Athletics U20 Championships in Grosseto, semifinalist at the 2019 European Athletics U23 Championships in Gävle.

She at the senior level won the bronze medal in the 4 × 100 metres relay at the 2022 European Athletics Championships in Munich.

== Achievements ==
| Year | Competition | Venue | Rank | Event | Time | Notes |
|---|---|---|---|---|---|---|
| 2022 | European Championships | (Germany) Munich | 3rd | 4 × 100 m relay | 42.84 | |

== See also ==
- Italian national track relay team
- Italian all-time lists - 4x100 metres relay
