= 2026 World Athletics U20 Championships – Mixed 4 × 100 metres relay =

Mixed 4 × 100 metres relay at the 2026 World Athletics U20 Championships
- Venue: Hayward Field
- Dates: 6 August (Round 1); 8 August (Final)
- Competitors: 92 from 21 nations
- Winning time: 41.21

Medalists
gold medal	Edwin Fermin Galvan; Elisa Valensin; Francesco Pagliarini; Kelly Doualla; Elisa Calzolari*; Carlotta Suppini*	Italy
silver medal	Divine Iheme; Savannah Morgan; Mathew Ajayi; Sophie Thomas	Great Britain
bronze medal	Cy Lugo; Ahlayna Taylor; Nicholas Altheimer; Ava Kitchings; Aster Jones*	United States

The mixed 4 × 100 metres relay at the 2026 World Athletics U20 Championships was held at Hayward Field in Eugene, United States on 5 and 8 August 2026.

== Results ==
=== Round 1 ===
Round 1 took place in the morning session on 6 August 2026. First 3 of each heat (Q) qualify to the final.

==== Heat 1 ====
Place	Nation	Athletes	Time	Notes
1	Australia	Uwezo Lubenda, Maya Taber, Kelechi Ekwomadu, Thewbelle Philp	41.64	Q, WU20R
2	Italy	Edwin Fermin Galvan, Elisa Calzolari, Francesco Pagliarini, Carlotta Suppini	41.74	Q, PB
3	Jamaica	Justin Stewart, Natrece East, Detarje Morgan, Renecia Edwards	42.08	Q, PB
4	Netherlands	Tom Esono-Keukelaar, Bente Jacobs, Quincy van't Hoff, Makeni Turay	42.33	PB
5	Brazil	Michael Cruz, Victoria Campos, Jean Augusto da Silva, Leticia Evelyn Lopes	42.77	PB
6	Estonia	Tristan Konso, Pia Lauren Matsalu, Dmitri Petrogradov, Miia Ott	43.69	
7	Bulgaria	Deyan Tsvetanov, Sophie Dimitrov, Yoan Kamenov, Radina Velichkova	43.73	

==== Heat 2 ====
Place	Nation	Athletes	Time	Notes
1	Great Britain	Divine Iheme, Savannah Morgan, Mathew Ajayi, Sophie Thomas	41.60	Q, WU20R
2	France	Thibaut Gromala, Paola Valognes, Dylan Telo, Beatrice Tassin	42.16	Q, PB
3	Poland	Łukasz Jasiński, Oliwia Kasprzak, Jakub Sarlej, Maja Gondek	42.18	Q, PB
4	Spain	Anthony Yunier Pérez, Celia Cortes, Hugo Pérez, Carla Aguirre	42.69	PB
5	South Africa	Zattu Hlongwane, Zoé Cillier, Marlon Kayster, Chrystabel Davis	42.87	PB
6	Mexico	Josue Gerardo Garcia, Sofía Muro, Carlos Daniel Fierro, Daniela Schulz	44.67	
7	Papua New Guinea	Ethan Asimba, Hephzibah Romalus, Kabake Lansana, Althea Dale	45.80	

==== Heat 3 ====
Place	Nation	Athletes	Time	Notes
1	United States	Cy Lugo, Ahlayna Taylor, Nicholas Altheimer, Aster Jones	41.82	Q
2	Nigeria	Tejiri Godwin, Chigozie Rosemary Nwankwo, Perfect Faye, Miracle Ezechukwu	41.91	Q, PB
3	Germany	Jakob Bauerschlag, Anne Böcker, Alvin Mawumba, Delisha Benelisa Domingos	42.12	Q, PB
4	Slovakia	Timotej Nemček, Ema Bendová, Dominik Chobot, Amy Bell Grebeči	42.54	PB
5	Belgium	Robin Quenoi, Ine Impens, Jari De Proft, Lore Foesters	43.04	
6	Chile	Franco Antonio Stefoni, Pilar Rodríguez, Tomas Leon, Roxana Ramírez	43.14	PB
7	Peru	Pablo Zunner Rodríguez, Catalina Yzaga, Mariano Fiol, Cayetana Chirinos	43.50	PB

=== Final ===
The final took place in the afternoon session on 8 August 2026.

Place	Nation	Athletes	Time	Notes
1st place, gold medalist(s)	Italy	Edwin Fermin Galvan, Elisa Valensin, Francesco Pagliarini, Kelly Doualla	41.21	WU20R
2nd place, silver medalist(s)	Great Britain	Divine Iheme, Savannah Morgan, Mathew Ajayi, Sophie Thomas	41.38	PB
3rd place, bronze medalist(s)	United States	Cy Lugo, Ahlayna Taylor, Nicholas Altheimer, Ava Kitchings	41.39	SB
4	Jamaica	Justin Stewart, Natrece East, Detarje Morgan, Renecia Edwards	41.92	PB
5	Germany	Jakob Bauerschlag, Lena Anochili, Alvin Mawumba, Delisha Benelisa Domingos	42.03	PB
6	Poland	Kacper Latkowski, Aleksandra Jeż, Jakub Sarlej, Maja Gondek	42.17	PB
—	Australia	Uwezo Lubenda, Maya Taber, Kelechi Ekwomadu, Thewbelle Philp	DNF	
—	France	Thibaut Gromala, Diane Fréart, Dylan Telo, Soudatou Niang	DNF	
—	Nigeria	Tejiri Godwin, Chigozie Rosemary Nwankwo, Perfect Faye, Miracle Ezechukwu	DQ	TR7.1
