= 2026 World Athletics U20 Championships – Men's 3000 metres steeplechase =

Men's 3000 metres steeplechase at the 2026 World Athletics U20 Championships
- Venue: Hayward Field
- Dates: 6 August (Round 1); 9 August (Final)
- Competitors: 31
- Winning time: 8:28.35 AU20R

Medalists
gold medal	Bakr El Asri	Spain
silver medal	Emmanuel Lemiso Someki	Kenya
bronze medal	Nicholas Kitum Losiwareng	Kenya

The men's 3000 metres steeplechase at the 2026 World Athletics U20 Championships was held at Hayward Field in Eugene, United States on 6 and 9 August 2026.

== Records ==
U20 standing records prior to the 2026 World Athletics U20 Championships were as follows:

Record	Athlete & Nationality	Mark	Location	Date
World U20 Record	Saif Saaeed Shaheen (KEN)	7:58.66	Brussels, Belgium	24 August 2001
Championship Record	Conseslus Kipruto (KEN)	8:06.10	Barcelona, Spain	15 July 2012
World U20 Leading	Edmund Serem (KEN)	8:01.61	Rabat, Morocco	31 May 2026

== Results ==
=== Round 1 ===
Round 1 took place in the morning session on 6 August 2026.

==== Heat 1 ====
Place	Athlete	Nation	Time	Notes
1	Nicholas Kitum Losiwareng	Kenya	8:45.26	Q
2	Mohamed Ali Hamdi	Tunisia	8:47.76	Q, PB
3	Soheib Dissa	Algeria	8:48.60	Q, PB
4	Bakr El Asri	Spain	8:48.65	Q
5	Adam Červinka	Czech Republic	8:48.67	Q
6	Levin Saveur	Germany	8:50.12	Q
7	Michał Gajdus	Poland	8:50.45	Q
8	Basile Astier	France	8:50.78	Q
9	Takumi Sugimoto	Japan	8:51.57	
10	Haakon Kamlesh Heltzer Sørstad	Norway	9:01.03	
11	Lars Oeschger	Switzerland	9:02.33	
12	Bradley Andrews-Callec	Great Britain	9:08.07	
13	Wilmer Santos	Bolivia	9:15.06	
14	Mario Francisco Vazquez	Mexico	9:39.47	
15	Afonso Oliveira	Portugal	9:45.67	

==== Heat 2 ====
Place	Athlete	Nation	Time	Notes
1	Emmanuel Lemiso Someki	Kenya	8:47.61	Q
2	Mahfoud Bellal	Morocco	8:48.48	Q
3	Jeremiah Kwemoi	Uganda	8:50.27	Q, PB
4	Marti Torregrossa	Spain	8:52.16	Q
5	Ulrik Jåvoll Hagen	Norway	8:52.21	Q
6	Zakaria Touahria	Algeria	8:53.08	Q
7	Sota Koga	Japan	8:53.42	Q
8	Austen Carrera	United States	8:53.45	Q, PB
9	Mathis Dubois	France	8:53.58	
10	Dillon Millard	Great Britain	8:54.75	
11	Jonathan Neethling	Australia	8:59.19	
12	Bence Acsádi	Hungary	9:02.41	
13	Leonardo Oliveira	Portugal	9:08.76	
14	Mohamed Ali Zinoubi	Tunisia	9:15.59	qR
15	Siyabonga Mbeleki	South Africa	9:18.06	
16	Marco Voggenreiter	Germany	9:19.81	

=== Final ===
The final took place in the afternoon session on 9 August 2026.

Place	Athlete	Nation	Time	Notes
1st place, gold medalist(s)	Bakr El Asri	Spain	8:28.35	AU20R
2nd place, silver medalist(s)	Emmanuel Lemiso Someki	Kenya	8:32.81	PB
3rd place, bronze medalist(s)	Nicholas Kitum Losiwareng	Kenya	8:38.05	
4	Marti Torregrossa	Spain	8:38.13	
5	Adam Červinka	Czech Republic	8:44.77	SB
6	Basile Astier	France	8:48.68	
7	Sota Koga	Japan	8:49.72	
8	Jeremiah Kwemoi	Uganda	8:49.84	PB
9	Soheib Dissa	Algeria	8:50.63	
10	Levin Saveur	Germany	8:50.91	
11	Zakaria Touahria	Algeria	8:51.00	
12	Mohamed Ali Hamdi	Tunisia	8:52.82	
13	Mohamed Ali Zinoubi	Tunisia	8:53.38	PB
14	Ulrik Jåvoll Hagen	Norway	8:58.32	
15	Mahfoud Bellal	Morocco	9:04.54	
16	Austen Carrera	United States	9:05.25	
—	Michał Gajdus	Poland	DNF	
