= Arianna De Masi =

Italian athlete

Personal information
- Nationality: Italian
- Born: 2 June 1999 (age 27)

Sport
- Sport: Athletics
- Event: Sprint

Achievements and titles
- Personal best(s): 100m: 11.26 (2024); 200m 23.27 (2024)

Arianna De Masi (born 2 June 1999) is an Italian sprinter. She competed at the 2024 Paris Olympics in the 4 x 100 metres relay, and in the 60 metres at the 2025 European Athletics Indoor Championships.

== Career ==
In April 2024, she lowered her 100 metres personal best to 11.30 seconds. She was part of the Italian 4 x 100 metres relay team that competed at the 2024 World Athletics Relays in Nassau, Bahamas, and successfully qualified for the 2024 Olympic Games. In May 2024, she lowered her 200 metres personal best to 23.46 running in Brussels, Belgium.

She competed for Italy at the 2024 European Athletics Championships in Rome, Italy, as part of the 4 x 100 metres relay team in June 2024, although they failed to progress through the heats and into the final. Later that month, he finished as runner-up to Zaynab Dosso over 100 metres at the Italian Athletics Championships in La Spezia, in a time of 11.28 seconds. She also placed fifth overall in the 200 metres race at the championships in a time of 23.27 seconds. She subsequently competed as part of the Italian team in the 4 x 100 metres relay at the 2024 Olympic Games in Paris, France, alongside Dosso, Dalia Kaddari and Irene Siragusa, although they again did not progress into the final from their qualifying heat.

She finished fourth over 60 meters at the Italian Indoor Athletics Championships in February 2025, running 7.30 seconds. She was selected for the 60 metres at the 2025 European Athletics Indoor Championships in Appeldoorn, Netherlands, where she ran 7.36 seconds and did not qualify for the semifinals.

== Personal life ==
She is from Lombardy and attended Istituto Parini Cecina in Milan.
