= Virginia Troiani =

Italian sprinter

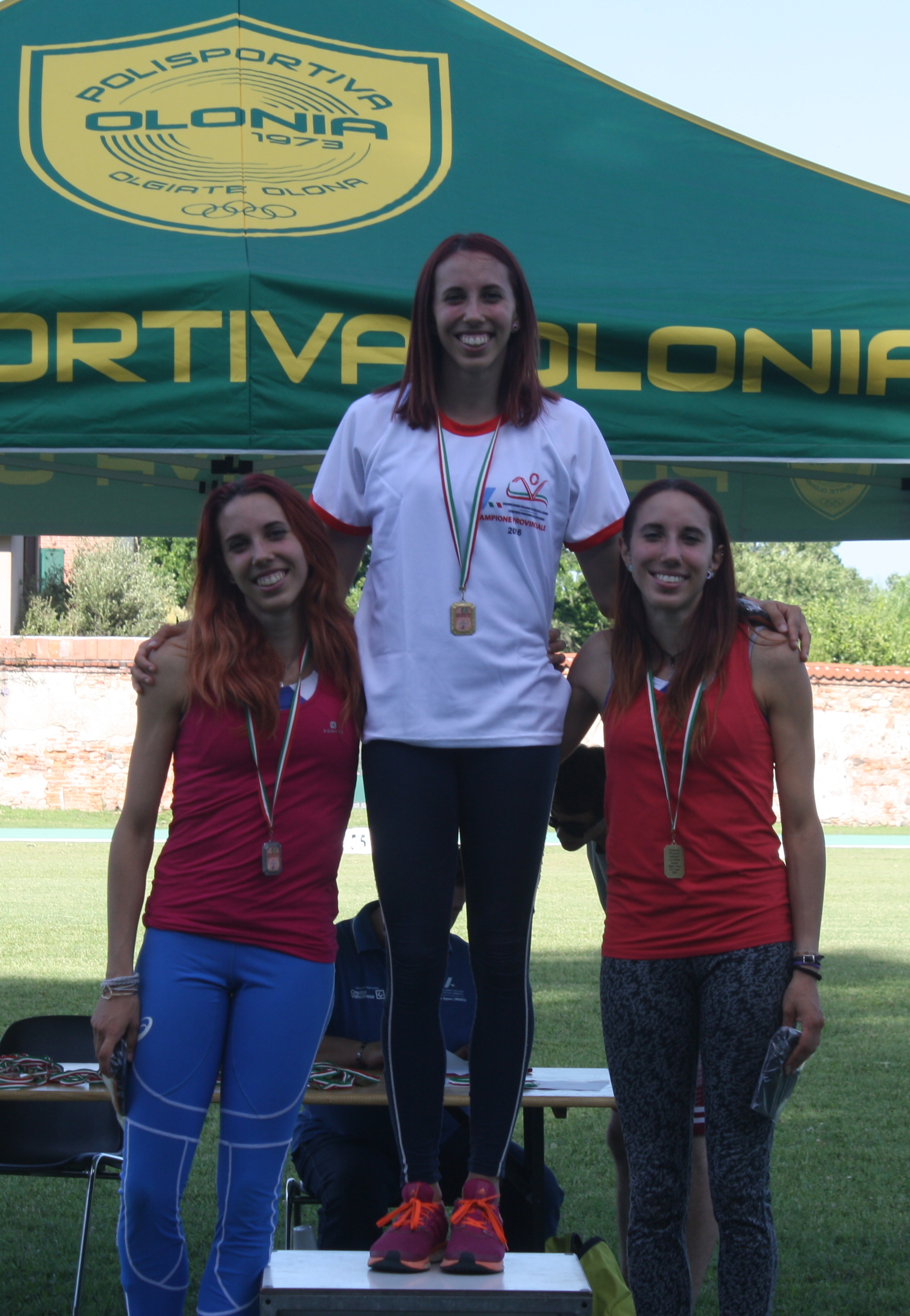
- Virginia (center) on the top step of the podium with her twin sisters Alexandra and Serena.

Personal information
- National team: Italy: 7 caps (2021-)
- Born: 22 February 1996 (age 30) Milan, Italy
- Height: 1.67 m (5 ft 6 in)
- Weight: 51 kg (112 lb)

Sport
- Sport: Athletics
- Event: Sprinting
- Club: Cus Pro Patria Milano
- Coached by: Vittorio Ramaglia

Achievements and titles
- Personal best: 100 m: 52.10 (2022)
Medal record
Event	1st	2nd	3rd
Mediterranean Games	1	0	1
Mediterranean U23 Championships	2	0	0
Total	3	0	1

Virginia Troiani (born 22 February 1996) is an Italian sprinter who competed at the 2022 World Athletics Championships.

Her twin sisters Alexandra and Serena also competed at the professional level in track and field.

== Career ==
She won two medals at the 2022 Mediterranean Games (bronze in 400m and gold in relay).

== Achievements ==
Year	Competition	Venue	Rank	Event	Time	Notes
2022	World Championships	(United States) Eugene	7th	4 × 400 m relay	3:26.75	SB

== See also ==
- Italian national track relay team
