= Divine Iheme =

British athlete (born 2009)

Personal information
- Nationality: British
- Born: Divine Ebubechukwu Iheme; 1 October 2009 (age 17) Oxford

Sport
- Sport: Athletics
- Event: Sprint
- Club: PWD Athletics Academy/Radley AC
- Coached by: Nkiruka Anu

Achievements and titles
- Personal bests: 60 m: 6.68 EU18B (2026); 100 m: 10.29 (2025); 200 m: 21.28 (2025)
Medal record
Men's athletics
Representing Great Britain
World U20 Championships
Silver medal – second place	2026 Eugene	4×100 m relay
Silver medal – second place	2026 Eugene	4x100 m mixed
European U18 Championships
Gold medal – first place	2026 Rieti	100m

Divine Ebubechukwu Iheme (born 1 October 2009) is a British sprinter. In February 2026, he set the European under-18 best time for the 60 metres and that summer won the gold medal over 100 metres at the 2026 European Athletics U18 Championships.

== Early life ==
Born in Oxford, he is based in Radley in Oxfordshire. His early athletics training was at Radley Athletics Club, based at Tilsley Park sports facility. He started focusing on sprinting in 2022 at the age of 12 years-old.

== Career ==
=== 2024 ===
He became English Schools Champion over 100 metres and won the 100m and 200m sprint double in the English Athletics indoor age-group championships in April 2024.

Iheme set a UK under-14 record of 10.56 for the 100 metres at the England Athletics U15 & U17 Open Championships in July 2024. He ran a world U14 best time of 10.30 seconds over 100 metres in August 2024 at Lee Valley. This time also placed him third on the European U18 all-time list behind Britain’s Teddy Wilson and France’s Jeff Erius.

Having turned 15 years-old in October 2024, he ran a personal best time of 6.76 seconds for the 60 metres in Lee Valley. This mark was 0.02 seconds behind the British U18 record set by Mark Lewis-Francis in 1999.

=== 2025 ===
In January 2025, he broke the world best mark for a 15-year old over 60 metres, previously set by J-Mee Samuels in 2003, running 6.72 and 6.71 seconds in consecutive races at the BFTTA Indoor Series in London. At the English Schools Championships he broke the inter boys 100m championships record of 10.48 with a run of 10.41 seconds (+1.2 m/s). In August 2025 in Lee Valley, he ran the 100 metres in 10.29 seconds (+1.7 m/s) for a British U18 best, and a European all-time best for 15 year-old sprinters. That month, he won over 100 metres and 200 metres ahead of Bronson Hearn-Smith in both races at the England Athletics U17 Championships in Birmingham.

=== 2026 ===
In February 2026, Iheme set a new European under-18 best time for the indoor 60 metres in Sheffield, running 6.68 seconds in winning the England Athletics U17 title. The following week, Iheme was a semi-finalist in the 60 metres at the senior 2026 British Indoor Athletics Championships in Birmingham.

In July, he won the gold medal in the 100 metres as a member of the Great Britain team at the 2026 European Athletics U18 Championships in Rieti, Italy. His winning time of 10.29 seconds a new championship record, breaking the previous best set by Marek Zakrzewski in 2022. It was the first time a British male had won the gold medal in the 100 m discipline in the history of the championships.

On 6 August, he was part of a Great Britain 4 x 100 metres mixed relay team alongside Savannah McKenzie Morgan, Sophie Thomas and Mathew Ajayi who set a world under-20 record of 41.60 seconds in heat two at the 2026 World Athletics U20 Championships. In the final, he ran as the Great Britain team lowered their time to 41.38 seconds and won the silver medal, finishing behind a new world-record setting Italian quartet led home by Kelly Doualla. He was nominated for European Athletics Men’s Rising Star for 2026. In October 2026, he was selected for the 2026/27 Olympic Futures Programme awarded by UK Athletics. The following month, he was nominated for British U20 Male Athlete of the Year by Athletics Weekly.

== Personal life ==
His parents, Innocent Iheme and Nkiruka Anu, were both athletes who represented Nigeria at the 2002 Commonwealth Games. He is coached by his mother, who after spending nine years in the British military founded the PWD (Power, Will and Drive) Athletic Academy in Oxfordshire. He has two older brothers, Praise, and Wisdom. He is nicknamed "Lightning".
