= Francesco Pagliarini =

Italian sprinter (born 2007)

Personal information
- Nationality: Italian
- Born: 3 August 2007 (age 19)

Sport
- Sport: Athletics
- Event: Sprints
Medal record
Men's athletics
Representing Italy
World U20 Championships
Gold medal – first place	2026 Eugene	4×100 m mixed

Francesco Pagliarini (born 3 August 2007) is an Italian sprinter.

== Career ==
In August 2026, Pagliarini competed at the 2026 World Athletics U20 Championships and was part of the Italian quartet that won a gold medal in the mixed 4 × 100 metres relay with a world under-20 record time of 41.21. He ran the team's fastest leg in 9.79 seconds.
