= Edwin Fermin Galvan =

Italian sprinter (born 2008)

Personal information
- Nationality: Italian
- Born: 30 April 2008 (age 18)

Sport
- Sport: Athletics
- Event: Sprints
Medal record
Men's athletics
Representing Italy
World U20 Championships
Gold medal – first place	2026 Eugene	4×100 m mixed
European Youth Olympic Festival
Silver medal – second place	2025 Skopje	100 m

Edwin Fermin Galvan (born 30 April 2008) is an Italian sprinter.

== Career ==
In July 2025, Galvan was selected to represent Italy at the 2025 European Youth Summer Olympic Festival. He won a silver medal in the 100 metres.

In August 2026, he competed at the 2026 World Athletics U20 Championships and was part of the Italian quartet that won a gold medal in the mixed 4 × 100 metres relay with a world under-20 record time of 41.21.
