= List of Italian Athletics Championships winners =

The Italian Athletics Championships (Italian: Campionati italiani assoluti di atletica leggera) is an annual outdoor track and field competition organised by the Federazione Italiana di Atletica Leggera (FIDAL), which serves as the Italian national championship for the sport. It is typically held as a two-day event in the Italian summer around late June to early August. The venue of the championships is decided on an annual basis. The winners have been Italian nationals.

The competition was first held in 1906 and has been held each year since with the exception of 1915–1917, and 1944. The first women's events were held in 1923.

== Men ==
=== Track ===
==== 100 metres ====
- 1906: Umberto Barozzi
- 1907: Umberto Barozzi (2)
- 1908: Umberto Barozzi (3)
- 1909: Guido Brignone
- 1910: Franco Giongo
- 1911: Franco Giongo (2)
- 1912: Franco Giongo (3)
- 1913: Francesco Carturan
- 1914: Franco Giongo (4)
- 1915–1918: not held
- 1919: Vittorio Zucca
- 1920: Vittorio Zucca (2)
- 1921: Giorgio Croci
- 1922: Vittorio Zucca (3)
- 1923: Franco Giongo (5)
- 1924: Ruggero Maregatti
- 1925: Ruggero Maregatti (2)
- 1926: Alberto D'Agostino
- 1927: Franco Reyser
- 1928: Edgardo Toetti
- 1929: Edgardo Toetti (2)
- 1930: Edgardo Toetti (3)
- 1931: Edgardo Toetti (4)
- 1932: Edgardo Toetti (5)
- 1933: Orazio Mariani
- 1934: Edgardo Toetti (6)
- 1935: Tullio Gonnelli
- 1936: Orazio Mariani (2)
- 1937: Orazio Mariani (3)
- 1938: Orazio Mariani (4)
- 1939: Orazio Mariani (5)
- 1940: Carlo Monti
- 1941: Carlo Monti (2)
- 1942: Orazio Mariani (6)
- 1943: Orazio Mariani (7)
- 1944: not held
- 1945: Aldo Santon
- 1946: Carlo Monti (3)
- 1947: Carlo Monti (4)
- 1948: Vittorio Cattoni
- 1949: Gesualdo Penna
- 1950: Antonio Siddi
- 1951: Franco Leccese
- 1952: Carlo Vittori
- 1953: Carlo Vittori (2)
- 1954: Luigi Gnocchi
- 1955: Luigi Gnocchi (2)
- 1956: Luigi Gnocchi (3)
- 1957: Livio Berruti
- 1958: Livio Berruti (2)
- 1959: Livio Berruti (3)
- 1960: Livio Berruti (4)
- 1961: Livio Berruti (5)
- 1962: Livio Berruti (6)
- 1963: Sergio Ottolina
- 1964: Sergio Ottolina (2)
- 1965: Pasquale Giannattasio
- 1966: Pasquale Giannattasio (2)
- 1967: Pasquale Giannattasio (3)
- 1968: Ennio Preatoni
- 1969: Pasqualino Abeti
- 1970: Ennio Preatoni (2)
- 1971: Norberto Oliosi
- 1972: Vincenzo Guerini
- 1973: Luigi Benedetti
- 1974: Pietro Mennea
- 1975: Pasqualino Abeti (2)
- 1976: Vincenzo Guerini (2)
- 1977: Luciano Caravani
- 1978: Pietro Mennea (2)
- 1979: Mauro Zuliani
- 1980: Pietro Mennea (3)
- 1981: Diego Nodari
- 1982: Pierfrancesco Pavoni
- 1983: Pierfrancesco Pavoni (2)
- 1984: Stefano Tilli
- 1985: Carlo Simionato
- 1986: Stefano Tilli (2)
- 1987: Pierfrancesco Pavoni (3)
- 1988: Antonio Ullo
- 1989: Stefano Tilli (3)
- 1990: Stefano Tilli (4)
- 1991: Ezio Madonia
- 1992: Stefano Tilli (5)
- 1993: Ezio Madonia (2)
- 1994: Sandro Floris
- 1995: Giovanni Puggioni
- 1996: Giovanni Puggioni (2)
- 1997: Stefano Tilli (6)
- 1998: Francesco Scuderi
- 1999: Andrea Colombo
- 2000: Francesco Scuderi (2)
- 2001: Francesco Scuderi (3)
- 2002: Francesco Scuderi (4)
- 2003: Francesco Scuderi (5)
- 2004: Simone Collio
- 2005: Simone Collio (2)
- 2006: Luca Verdecchia
- 2007: Koura Kaba Fantoni
- 2008: Fabio Cerutti
- 2009: Simone Collio (3)
- 2010: Simone Collio (4)
- 2011: Matteo Galvan
- 2012: Fabio Cerutti (2)
- 2013: Delmas Obou
- 2014: Delmas Obou (2)
- 2015: Fabio Cerutti (3)
- 2016: Filippo Tortu
- 2017: Federico Cattaneo
- 2018: Marcell Jacobs
- 2019: Marcell Jacobs (2)
- 2020: Marcell Jacobs (3)
- 2021: Marcell Jacobs (4)
- 2022: Marcell Jacobs (5)
- 2023: Samuele Ceccarelli
- 2024: Matteo Melluzzo
- 2025: Fausto Desalu
- 2026: Marcell Jacobs (6)

==== 200 metres ====
- 1914: Franco Giongo
- 1915–1918: not held
- 1919: Gian Ercole Salvi
- 1920: Vittorio Zucca
- 1921: Carlo Mereu
- 1922: Paolo Bogani
- 1923: Franco Giongo (2)
- 1924: Ruggero Maregatti
- 1925: Enrico Torre
- 1926: Pietro Pastorino
- 1927: Franco Reyser
- 1928: Edgardo Toetti
- 1929: Ruggero Maregatti (2)
- 1930: Ruggero Maregatti (3)
- 1931: Ruggero Maregatti (4)
- 1932: Edgardo Toetti (2)
- 1933: Angelo Ferrario
- 1934: Edgardo Toetti (3)
- 1935: Tullio Gonnelli
- 1936: Giancarlo Orio
- 1937: Angelo Ferrario (2)
- 1938: Tullio Gonnelli (2)
- 1939: Tullio Gonnelli (3)
- 1940: Tullio Gonnelli (4)
- 1941: Carlo Monti
- 1942: Carlo Monti (2)
- 1943: Orazio Mariani
- 1944: not held
- 1945: Aldo Santon
- 1946: Carlo Monti (3)
- 1947: Aldo Turrini
- 1948: Antonio Siddi
- 1949: Carlo Monti (4)
- 1950: Franco Leccese
- 1951: Wolfango Montanari
- 1952: Luigi Grissi
- 1953: Lucio Sangermano
- 1954: Wolfango Montanari (2)
- 1955: Luigi Gnocchi
- 1956: Luigi Gnocchi (2)
- 1957: Livio Berruti
- 1958: Livio Berruti (2)
- 1959: Livio Berruti (3)
- 1960: Livio Berruti (4)
- 1961: Livio Berruti (5)
- 1962: Livio Berruti (6)
- 1963: Armando Sardi
- 1964: Sergio Ottolina
- 1965: Livio Berruti (7)
- 1966: Sergio Ottolina (2)
- 1967: Ito Giani
- 1968: Livio Berruti (8)
- 1969: Pasqualino Abeti
- 1970: Giacomo Puosi
- 1971: Pietro Mennea
- 1972: Pietro Mennea (2)
- 1973: Pietro Mennea (3)
- 1974: Pietro Mennea (4)
- 1975: Pasqualino Abeti (2)
- 1976: Pietro Mennea (5)
- 1977: Pietro Mennea (6)
- 1978: Pietro Mennea (7)
- 1979: Pietro Mennea (8)
- 1980: Pietro Mennea (9)
- 1981: Giovanni Bongiorni
- 1982: Carlo Simionato
- 1983: Pietro Mennea (10)
- 1984: Pietro Mennea (11)
- 1985: Carlo Simionato (2)
- 1986: Stefano Tilli
- 1987: Pierfrancesco Pavoni
- 1988: Stefano Tilli (2)
- 1989: Sandro Floris
- 1990: Giovanni Puggioni
- 1991: Stefano Tilli (3)
- 1992: Giorgio Marras
- 1993: Giorgio Marras (2)
- 1994: Giorgio Marras (3)
- 1995: Angelo Cipolloni
- 1996: Angelo Cipolloni (2)
- 1997: Giovanni Puggioni (2)
- 1998: Carlo Occhiena
- 1999: Maurizio Checcucci
- 2000: Alessandro Cavallaro
- 2001: Marco Torrieri
- 2002: Emanuele Di Gregorio
- 2003: Alessandro Cavallaro (2)
- 2004: Alessandro Attene
- 2005: Koura Kaba Fantoni
- 2006: Stefano Anceschi
- 2007: Andrew Howe
- 2008: Matteo Galvan
- 2009: Roberto Donati
- 2010: Roberto Donati (2)
- 2011: Andrew Howe (2)
- 2012: Andrew Howe (3)
- 2013: Diego Marani
- 2014: Davide Manenti
- 2015: Diego Marani (2)
- 2016: Fausto Desalu
- 2017: Fausto Desalu (2)
- 2018: Davide Re
- 2019: Antonio Infantino
- 2020: Antonio Infantino (2)
- 2021: Fausto Desalu (3)
- 2022: Diego Pettorossi
- 2023: Filippo Tortu
- 2024: Fausto Desalu (4)
- 2025: Fausto Desalu (5)
- 2026: Filippo Dezza

==== 400 metres ====
- 1907: Umberto Barozzi
- 1908: Emilio Lunghi
- 1909: Guido Brignone
- 1910: Franco Giongo
- 1911: Franco Giongo (2)
- 1912: Franco Giongo (3)
- 1913: Gian Ercole Salvi
- 1914: Franco Giongo (4)
- 1915–1918: not held
- 1919: Gian Ercole Salvi (2)
- 1920: Giuseppe Bonini
- 1921: Ermete Alfieri
- 1922: Guido Cominotto
- 1923: Guido Cominotto (2)
- 1924: Alfredo Gargiullo
- 1925: Luigi Parolini
- 1926: Luigi Facelli
- 1927: Alfredo Gargiullo (2)
- 1928: Ettore Tavernari
- 1929: Ettore Tavernari (2)
- 1930: Luigi Facelli (2)
- 1931: Manfredo Giacomelli
- 1932: Ettore Tavernari (3)
- 1933: Giacomo Carlini
- 1934: Ettore Tavernari (4)
- 1935: Ettore Tavernari (5)
- 1936: Marsilio Rossi
- 1937: Mario Lanzi
- 1938: Angelo Ferrari
- 1939: Ottavio Missoni
- 1940: Mario Lanzi (2)
- 1941: Mario Lanzi (3)
- 1942: Mario Lanzi (4)
- 1943: Mario Lanzi (5)
- 1944: not held
- 1945: Luigi Paterlini
- 1946: Gioacchino Dorascenzi
- 1947: Antonio Siddi
- 1948: Luigi Paterlini (2)
- 1949: Antonio Siddi (2)
- 1950: Baldassare Porto
- 1951: Antonio Siddi (3)
- 1952: Vincenzo Lombardo
- 1953: Antonio Siddi (4)
- 1954: Vincenzo Lombardo (2)
- 1955: Vincenzo Lombardo (3)
- 1956: Renato Panciera
- 1957: Adriano Loddo
- 1958: Mario Fraschini
- 1959: Renato Panciera (2)
- 1960: Mario Fraschini (2)
- 1961: Mario Fraschini (3)
- 1962: Mario Fraschini (4)
- 1963: Mario Fraschini (5)
- 1964: Bruno Bianchi
- 1965: Sergio Bello
- 1966: Sergio Bello (2)
- 1967: Sergio Bello (3)
- 1968: Sergio Bello (4)
- 1969: Sergio Bello (5)
- 1970: Furio Fusi
- 1971: Marcello Fiasconaro
- 1972: Marcello Fiasconaro (2)
- 1973: Marcello Fiasconaro (3)
- 1974: Alfonso Di Guida
- 1975: Flavio Borghi
- 1976: Alfonso Di Guida (2)
- 1977: Alfonso Di Guida (3)
- 1978: Stefano Malinverni
- 1979: Stefano Malinverni (2)
- 1980: Stefano Malinverni (3)
- 1981: Mauro Zuliani
- 1982: Mauro Zuliani (2)
- 1983: Roberto Ribaud
- 1984: Donato Sabia
- 1985: Pierfrancesco Pavoni
- 1986: Mauro Zuliani (3)
- 1987: Marcello Pantone
- 1988: not held
- 1989: Andrea Montanari
- 1990: Andrea Nuti
- 1991: Andrea Nuti (2)
- 1992: Marco Vaccari
- 1993: Andrea Nuti (3)
- 1994: Marco Vaccari (2)
- 1995: Andrea Nuti (4)
- 1996: Andrea Nuti (5)
- 1997: Marco Vaccari (3)
- 1998: Edoardo Vallet
- 1999: Marco Vaccari (4)
- 2000: Ashraf Saber
- 2001: Andrea Barberi
- 2002: Andrea Barberi (2)
- 2003: Andrea Barberi (3)
- 2004: Andrea Barberi (4)
- 2005: Andrea Barberi (5)
- 2006: Andrea Barberi (6)
  and Luca Galletti
- 2007: Andrea Barberi (7)
- 2008: Andrea Barberi (8)
- 2009: Matteo Galvan
- 2010: Marco Vistalli
- 2011: Marco Vistalli (2)
- 2012: Claudio Licciardello
- 2013: Matteo Galvan (2)
- 2014: Matteo Galvan (3)
- 2015: Matteo Galvan (4)
- 2016: Matteo Galvan (5)
- 2017: Davide Re
- 2018: Davide Re (2)
- 2019: Matteo Galvan (6)
- 2020: Edoardo Scotti
- 2021: Edoardo Scotti (2)
- 2022: Edoardo Scotti (3)
- 2023: Davide Re (3)
- 2024: Edoardo Scotti (4)

==== 800 metres ====
- 1913: Gian Ercole Salvi
- 1914: Emilio Lunghi
- 1915–1918: not held
- 1919: Dante Bertoni
- 1920: Ernesto Ambrosini
- 1921: Giuseppe Bonini
- 1922: Guido Cominotto
- 1923: Guido Cominotto (2)
- 1924: Guido Cominotto (3)
- 1925: Giovanni Garaventa
- 1926: Guido Cominotto (4)
- 1927: Ettore Tavernari
- 1928: Ettore Tavernari (2)
- 1929: Ettore Tavernari (3)
- 1930: Mario Tognoli
- 1931: Luigi Beccali
- 1932: Ettore Tavernari (4)
- 1933: Umberto Cerati
- 1934: Mario Lanzi
- 1935: Mario Lanzi (2)
- 1936: Mario Lanzi (3)
- 1937: Carlo Guasconi
- 1938: Mario Lanzi (4)
- 1939: Mario Lanzi (5)
- 1940: Gioacchino Dorascenzi
- 1941: Bruno Donnini
- 1942: Mario Lanzi (6)
- 1943: Mario Lanzi (7)
- 1944: not held
- 1945: Giovanni Bard
- 1946: Mario Lanzi (8)
- 1947: Egidio Pederzoli
- 1948: Aldo Fracassi
- 1949: Lorenzo Lunghi
- 1950: Aldo Fracassi (2)
- 1951: Aldo Fracassi (3)
- 1952: Marcello Dani
- 1953: Vittorio Maggioni
- 1954: Alvaro Lensi
- 1955: Giovanni Scavo
- 1956: Gianfranco Baraldi
- 1957: Giovanni Scavo (2)
- 1958: Gianfranco Baraldi (2)
- 1959: Gianfranco Baraldi (3)
- 1960: Mario Fraschini
- 1961: Francesco Bianchi
- 1962: Francesco Bianchi (2)
- 1963: Francesco Bianchi (3)
- 1964: Francesco Bianchi (4)
- 1965: Francesco Bianchi (5)
- 1966: Gianfranco Carabelli
- 1967: Francesco Bianchi (6)
- 1968: Franco Arese
- 1969: Franco Arese (2)
- 1970: Gianni Del Buono
- 1971: Sandro Castelli
- 1972: Franco Arese (3)
- 1973: Franco Arese (4)
- 1974: Carlo Grippo
- 1975: Bruno Magnani
- 1976: Carlo Grippo (2)
- 1977: Gabriele Ferrero
- 1978: Carlo Grippo (3)
- 1979: Carlo Grippo (4)
- 1980: Carlo Grippo (5)
- 1981: Carlo Grippo (6)
- 1982: Gabriele Ferrero (2)
- 1983: Donato Sabia
- 1984: Donato Sabia (2)
- 1985: Alberto Barsotti
- 1986: Alberto Barsotti (2)
- 1987: Tonino Viali
- 1988: Donato Sabia (3)
- 1989: Tonino Viali (2)
- 1990: Tonino Viali (3)
- 1991: Tonino Viali (4)
- 1992: Andrea Benvenuti
- 1993: Giuseppe D'Urso
- 1994: Giuseppe D'Urso (2)
- 1995: Davide Cadoni
- 1996: Andrea Giocondi
- 1997: Andrea Abelli
- 1998: Andrea Longo
- 1999: Andrea Longo (2)
- 2000: Andrea Longo (3)
- 2001: Andrea Giocondi (2)
- 2002: Francesco Roncalli
- 2003: Livio Sciandra
- 2004: Francesco Roncalli (2)
- 2005: Andrea Longo (4)
- 2006: Maurizio Bobbato
- 2007: Livio Sciandra (2)
- 2008: Livio Sciandra (3)
- 2009: Mario Scapini
- 2010: Lukas Rifesser
- 201:1 Giordano Benedetti
- 2012: Giordano Benedetti (2)
- 2013: Michele Oberti
- 2014: Giordano Benedetti (3)
- 2015: Giordano Benedetti (4)
- 2016: Giordano Benedetti (5)
- 2017: Stefano Migliorati
- 2018: Enrico Brazzale
- 2019: Simone Barontini
- 2020: Simone Barontini (2)
- 2021: Simone Barontini (3)
- 2022: Catalin Tecuceanu
- 2023: Simone Barontini (4)
- 2024: Simone Barontini (5)

==== 1500 metres ====
- 1906: Emilio Lunghi
- 1907–1912: not held
- 1913: Emilio Lunghi (2)
- 1914: Mario Candelori
- 1915–1918: not held
- 1919: Arturo Porro
- 1920: Ernesto Ambrosini
- 1921: Ernesto Ambrosini (2)
- 1922: Ferruccio Bruni
- 1923: Disma Ferrario
- 1924: Disma Ferrario (2)
- 1925: Disma Ferrario (3)
- 1926: Giovanni Garaventa
- 1927: Angelo Davoli
- 1928: Luigi Beccali
- 1929: Luigi Beccali (2)
- 1930: Luigi Beccali (3)
- 1931: Luigi Beccali (4)
- 1932: Mario Martini
- 1933: Alfredo Furia
- 1934: Luigi Beccali (5)
- 1935: Luigi Beccali (6)
- 1936: Luigi Beccali (7)
- 1937: Mario Martini
- 1938: Luigi Beccali (8)
- 1939: Guerrino Vitale
- 1940: Guerrino Vitale (2)
- 1941: Guerrino Vitale (3)
- 1942: Guerrino Vitale (4)
- 1943: Mario Cosi
- 1944: not held
- 1945: Giovanni Bard
- 1946: Umberto Fiori
- 1947: Giovanni Nocco
- 1948: Umberto Fiori (2)
- 1949: Angelo Tagliapietra
- 1950: Rinaldo Molina
- 1951: Vittorio Maggioni
- 1952: Vittorio Maggioni (2)
- 1953: Vittorio Maggioni (3)
- 1954: Vittorio Maggioni (4)
- 1955: Gianfranco Baraldi
- 1956: Gianfranco Baraldi (2)
- 1957: Gianfranco Baraldi (3)
- 1958: Gianfranco Baraldi (4)
- 1959: Alfredo Rizzo
- 1960: Alfredo Rizzo (2)
- 1961: Alfredo Rizzo (3)
- 1962: Francesco Bianchi
- 1963: Francesco Bianchi (2)
- 1964: Francesco Bianchi (3)
- 1965: Francesco Bianchi (4)
- 1966: Franco Arese
- 1967: Franco Arese (2)
- 1968: Franco Arese (3)
- 1969: Gianni Del Buono
- 1970: Franco Arese (4)
- 1971: Renzo Finelli
- 1972: Giulio Riga
- 1973: Gianni Del Buono (2)
- 1974: Luigi Zarcone
- 1975: Vittorio Fontanella
- 1976: Vittorio Fontanella (2)
- 1977: Giacinto De Cataldo
- 1978: Fulvio Costa
- 1979: Vittorio Fontanella (3)
- 1980: Carlo Grippo
- 1981: Claudio Patrignani
- 1982: Claudio Patrignani (2)
- 1983: Claudio Patrignani (3)
- 1984: Claudio Patrignani (4)
- 1985: Stefano Mei
- 1986: Alessandro Lambruschini
- 1987: Claudio Patrignani (5)
- 1988: Davide Tirelli
- 1989: Davide Tirelli (2)
- 1990: Gennaro Di Napoli
- 1991: Gennaro Di Napoli (2)
- 1992: Gennaro Di Napoli (3)
- 1993: Alessandro Lambruschini (2)
- 1994: Tonino Viali
- 1995: Massimo Pegoretti
- 1996: Roberto Baderna
- 1997: Andrea Abelli
- 1998: Lorenzo Lazzari
- 1999: Lorenzo Lazzari (2)
- 2000: Christian Obrist
- 2001: Lorenzo Lazzari (3)
- 2002: Christian Obrist (2)
- 2003: Christian Obrist (3)
- 2004: Christian Obrist (4)
- 2005: Christian Obrist (5)
- 2006: Christian Obrist (6)
- 2007: Christian Obrist (7)
- 2008: Lukas Rifesser
- 2009: Mario Scapini
- 2010: Giulio Iannone
- 2011: Merihun Crespi
- 2012: Christian Obrist (8)
- 2013: Merihun Crespi (2)
- 2014: Mohad Abdikadar Sheik
- 2015: Mohad Abdikadar Sheik (2)
- 2016: Yemaneberhan Crippa
- 2017: Joao Bussotti
- 2018: Joao Bussotti
- 2019: Matteo Spanu
- 2020: Joao Bussotti
- 2021: Mohamed Zerrad
- 2022: Ossama Meslek
- 2023: Pietro Arese
- 2024: Federico Riva

==== 5000 metres ====
- 1907: Dorando Pietri
- 1908: Pericle Pagliani
- 1909: Ezio Cappellini
- 1910: Giuseppe Cattro
- 1911: Alfonso Orlando
- 1912: Alfonso Orlando (2)
- 1913: Oreste Luppi
- 1914: Primo Brega
- 1915–1918: not held
- 1919: Primo Brega (2)
- 1920: Carlo Speroni
- 1921: Carlo Speroni (2)
- 1922: Ernesto Ambrosini
- 1923: Ernesto Ambrosini (2)
- 1924: Angelo Davoli
- 1925: Giovanni Busan
- 1926: Angelo Davoli (2)
- 1927: Luigi Boero
- 1928: Luigi Boero (2)
- 1929: Luigi Boero (3)
- 1930: Nello Bartolini
- 1931: Corrado Franceschini
- 1932: Giuseppe Lippi
- 1933: Bruno Betti
- 1934: Salvatore Mastroieni
- 1935: Luigi Beccali
- 1936: Umberto Cerati
- 1937: Luigi Pellin
- 1938: Giuseppe Beviacqua
- 1939: Giuseppe Beviacqua (2)
- 1940: Giuseppe Beviacqua (3)
- 1941: Giuseppe Beviacqua (4)
- 1942: Giuseppe Beviacqua (5)
- 1943: Giuseppe Beviacqua (6)
- 1944: not held
- 1945: Alfredo Lazzerini
- 1946: Giovanni Nocco
- 1947: Giovanni Nocco (2)
- 1948: Giovanni Nocco (3)
- 1949: Mario Nocco
- 1950: Giovanni Nocco (4)
- 1951: Valentino Manzutti
- 1952: Giacomo Peppicelli
- 1953: Rino Lavelli
- 1954: Giacomo Peppicelli (2)
- 1955: Francesco Perrone
- 1956: Francesco Perrone (2)
- 1957: Gianfranco Baraldi
- 1958: Antonio Ambu
- 1959: Luigi Conti
- 1960: Luigi Conti (2)
- 1961: Antonio Ambu (2)
- 1962: Antonio Ambu (3)
- 1963: Luigi Conti (3)
- 1964: Antonio Ambu (4)
- 1965: Antonio Ambu (5)
- 1966: Renzo Finelli
- 1967: Antonio Ambu (6)
- 1968: Giuseppe Ardizzone
- 1969: Renzo Finelli (2)
- 1970: Giuseppe Ardizzone (2)
- 1971: Franco Arese
- 1972: Aldo Tomasini
- 1973: Aldo Tomasini (2)
- 1974: Giuseppe Cindolo
- 1975: Giuseppe Cindolo (2)
- 1976: Giuseppe Gerbi
- 1977: Venanzio Ortis
- 1978: Piero Selvaggio
- 1979: Mariano Scartezzini
- 1980: Alberto Cova
- 1981: Piero Selvaggio (2)
- 1982: Alberto Cova (2)
- 1983: Alberto Cova (3)
- 1984: Stefano Mei
- 1985: Alberto Cova (4)
- 1986: Stefano Mei (2)
- 1987: Ranieri Carenza
- 1988: Francesco Panetta
- 1989: Stefano Mei (3)
- 1990: Renato Gotti
- 1991: Stefano Mei (4)
- 1992: Renato Gotti (2)
- 1993: Giuliano Baccani
- 1994: Angelo Carosi
- 1995: Francesco Bennici
- 1996: Umberto Pusterla
- 1997: Simone Zanon
- 1998: Angelo Carosi (2)
- 1999: Luciano Di Pardo
- 2000: Gennaro Di Napoli
- 2001: Salvatore Vincenti
- 2002: Salvatore Vincenti (2)
- 2003: Salvatore Vincenti (3)
- 2004: Michele Gamba
- 2005: Simone Zanon (2)
- 2006: Cosimo Caliandro
- 2007: Daniele Meucci
- 2008: Daniele Meucci (2)
- 2009: Stefano La Rosa
- 2010: Stefano La Rosa (2)
- 2011: Stefano La Rosa (3)
- 2012: Stefano La Rosa (4)
- 2013: Stefano La Rosa (5)
- 2014: Marouan Razine
- 2015: Marouan Razine (2)
- 2016: Yassine Rachik (3)
- 2017: Marco Najibe Salami
- 2018: Marouan Razine (4)
- 2019: Marouan Razine (5)
- 2020: Ala Zoghlami
- 2021: Pietro Riva
- 2022: Yemaneberhan Crippa
- 2023: Jacopo De Marchi
- 2024: Pietro Arese

==== 10000 metres ====
Due to television requirements (the race was too long), since 2013 the 10,000 m track championships have been held at a separate location and date, prior to the global national championships. Therefore, Bressanone 2012 was the last edition to include the 10,000 m track race, while Ancona 2013, held in May before the Milan championships, was the first stand-alone edition.

- 1913: Carlo Martinenghi
- 1914: Carlo Speroni
- 1915–1918: not held
- 1919: Augusto Maccario
- 1920: Carlo Speroni (2)
- 1921: Carlo Speroni (3)
- 1922: Primo Brega
- 1923: Costante Lussana
- 1924: Carlo Speroni (4)
- 1925: Carlo Speroni (5)
- 1926: Francesco Mai
- 1927: Luigi Rossini
- 1928: Giuseppe Robino
- 1929: Giuseppe Robino (2)
- 1930: Giuseppe Robino (3)
- 1931: Angelo Malachina
- 1932: Spartaco Morelli
- 1933: Angelo Malachina (2)
- 1934: Spartaco Morelli (2)
- 1935: Giovanni Balbusso
- 1936: Giuseppe Beviacqua
- 1937: Giuseppe Beviacqua (2)
- 1938: Giuseppe Lippi
- 1939: Giuseppe Lippi (2)
- 1940: Cristofano Sestini
- 1941: Giovanni Cultrone
- 1942: Giuseppe Beviacqua (3)
- 1943: Giuseppe Beviacqua (4)
- 1944: not held
- 1945: Alfredo Lazzerini
- 1946: Giuseppe Beviacqua (5)
- 1947: Giuseppe Beviacqua (6)
- 1948: Giuseppe Beviacqua (7)
- 1949: Pietro Balistreri
- 1950: Cristofano Sestini (2)
- 1951: Giacomo Peppicelli
- 1952: Giacomo Peppicelli (2)
- 1953: Giacomo Peppicelli (3)
- 1954: Giambattista Martini
- 1955: Giuseppe Lavelli
- 1956: Franco Volpi
- 1957: Francesco Perrone
- 1958: Antonio Ambu
- 1959: Franco Volpi (2)
- 1960: Luigi Conti
- 1961: Franco Antonelli
- 1962: Antonio Ambu (2)
- 1963: Luigi Conti (2)
- 1964: Antonio Ambu (3)
- 1965: Antonio Ambu (4)
- 1966: Antonio Ambu (5)
- 1967: Antonio Ambu (6)
- 1968: Antonio Ambu (7)
- 1969: Giuseppe Cindolo
- 1970: Giuseppe Cindolo (2)
- 1971: Giuseppe Cindolo (3)
- 1972: Giuseppe Cindolo (4)
- 1973: Giuseppe Cindolo (5)
- 1974: Giuseppe Cindolo (6)
- 1975: Giuseppe Cindolo (7)
- 1976: Venanzio Ortis
- 1977: Luigi Zarcone
- 1978: Venanzio Ortis (2)
- 1979: Luigi Zarcone (2)
- 1980: Claudio Solone
- 1981: Alberto Cova
- 1982: Alberto Cova (2)
- 1983: Loris Pimazzoni
- 1984: Gianni Demadonna
- 1985: Salvatore Nicosia
- 1986: Francesco Panetta
- 1987: Giuseppe Miccoli
- 1988: Giuseppe Miccoli (2)
- 1989: Massimo Santamaria
- 1990: Graziano Calvaresi
- 1991: Vincenzo Modica
- 1992: Paolo Donati
- 1993: Stefano Baldini
- 1994: Stefano Baldini (2)
- 1995: Stefano Baldini (3)
- 1996: Stefano Baldini (4)
- 1997: Rachid Berradi
- 1998: Danilo Goffi
- 1999: Vincenzo Modica (2)
- 2000: Daniele Caimmi
- 2001: Stefano Baldini (5)
- 2002: Stefano Baldini (6)
- 2003: Marco Bartoletti
- 2004: Marco Mazza
- 2005: Giuliano Battocletti
- 2006: Daniele Meucci
- 2007: Daniele Meucci (2)
- 2008: Stefano La Rosa
- 2009: Stefano La Rosa (2)
- 2010: Daniele Meucci (3)
- 2011: Domenico Ricatti
- 2012: Simone Gariboldi

Stand alone championship

- 2013: Jamel Chatbi
- 2014: Domenico Ricatti (2)
- 2015: Said El Otmani
- 2016: Ahmed El Mazoury
- 2017: Ahmed El Mazoury (2)
- 2018: Stefano La Rosa (3)
- 2019: Lorenzo Dini
- 2020: Osama Zoghlami
- 2021: Iliass Aouani
- 2022: Pietro Riva
- 2023: Pietro Riva (2)
- 2024: Pietro Riva (3)
- 2025: Francesco Guerra
- 2026: Francesco Guerra (2)

==== 110 m hurdles ====
- 1907: Andrea Pinzi-Reynaud
- 1908: Alfredo Pagani
- 1909: Ezio Massa
- 1910: Emilio Brambilla
- 1911: Daclamo Colbachini
- 1912: Daclamo Colbachini (2)
- 1913: Giovanni Villa
- 1914: Giovanni Villa (2)
- 1915–1918: not held
- 1919: Daclamo Colbachini (3)
- 1920: Daclamo Colbachini (4)
- 1921: Adolfo Contoli
- 1922: Adolfo Contoli (2)
- 1923: Adolfo Contoli (3)
- 1924: Adolfo Contoli (4)
- 1925: Goffredo Alessandrini
- 1926: Adolfo Contoli (5)
- 1927: Giacomo Carlini
- 1928: Giacomo Carlini (2)
- 1929: Giacomo Carlini (3)
- 1930: Luigi Facelli
- 1931: Luigi Facelli (2)
- 1932: Corrado Valle
- 1933: Corrado Valle (2)
- 1934: Corrado Valle (3)
- 1935: Gianni Caldana
- 1936: Gianni Caldana (2)
- 1937: Gianni Caldana (3)
- 1938: Gianni Caldana (4)
- 1939: Giorgio Oberweger
- 1940: Gianni Caldana (5)
- 1941: Aristide Facchini
- 1942: Giulio Dentis
- 1943: Aristide Facchini (2)
- 1944: not held
- 1945: Albano Albanese
- 1946: Arnaldo Balestra
- 1947: Arnaldo Balestra (2)
- 1948: Albano Albanese (2)
- 1949: Albano Albanese (3)
- 1950: Albano Albanese (4)
- 1951: Albano Albanese (5)
- 1952: Albano Albanese (6)
- 1953: Ezio Nardelli
- 1954: Ezio Nardelli (2)
- 1955: Giampiero Massardi
- 1956: Giampiero Massardi (2)
- 1957: Giorgio Mazza
- 1958: Giorgio Mazza (2)
- 1959: Nereo Svara
- 1960: Giovanni Cornacchia
- 1961: Nereo Svara (2)
- 1962: Giovanni Cornacchia (2)
- 1963: Giorgio Mazza (3)
- 1964: Giovanni Cornacchia (3)
- 1965: Eddy Ottoz
- 1966: Eddy Ottoz (2)
- 1967: Eddy Ottoz (3)
- 1968: Eddy Ottoz (4)
- 1969: Eddy Ottoz (5)
- 1970: Sergio Liani
- 1971: Sergio Liani (2)
- 1972: Giuseppe Buttari
- 1973: Sergio Liani (3)
- 1974: Giuseppe Buttari (2)
- 1975: Giuseppe Buttari (3)
- 1976: Giuseppe Buttari (4)
- 1977: Sergio Liani
- 1978: Giuseppe Buttari (5)
- 1979: Giuseppe Buttari (6)
- 1980: Gianni Ronconi
- 1981: Daniele Fontecchio
- 1982: Daniele Fontecchio (2)
- 1983: Daniele Fontecchio (3)
- 1984: Daniele Fontecchio (4)
- 1985: Daniele Fontecchio (5)
- 1986: Daniele Fontecchio (6)
- 1987: Gianni Tozzi
- 1988: Gianni Tozzi (2)
- 1989: Fausto Frigerio
- 1990: Laurent Ottoz
- 1991: Laurent Ottoz (2)
- 1992: Laurent Ottoz (3)
- 1993: Fausto Frigerio (2)
- 1994: Laurent Ottoz (4)
- 1995: Mauro Re
- 1996: Mauro Rossi
- 1997: Mauro Rossi (2)
- 1998: Mauro Rossi (3)
- 1999: Andrea Giaconi
- 2000: Emiliano Pizzoli
- 2001: Emiliano Pizzoli (2)
- 2002: Emiliano Pizzoli (3)
- 2003: Emiliano Pizzoli (4)
- 2004: Emiliano Pizzoli (5)
- 2005: Andrea Giaconi
- 2006: Andrea Giaconi (2)
- 2007: Emanuele Abate
- 2008: Emanuele Abate (2)
- 2009: Stefano Tedesco
- 2010: Stefano Tedesco (2)
- 2011: Emanuele Abate (3)
- 2012: Paolo Dal Molin
- 2013: Hassane Fofana
- 2014: Hassane Fofana (2)
- 2015: Hassane Fofana (3)
- 2016: Hassane Fofana (4)
- 2017: Lorenzo Perini
- 2018: Lorenzo Perini (2)
- 2019: Hassane Fofana (5)
- 2020: Lorenzo Perini (3)
- 2021: Paolo Dal Molin (2)
- 2022: Hassane Fofana (6)
- 2023: Lorenzo Simonelli
- 2023: Lorenzo Simonelli (2)

==== 400 m hurdles ====
- 1913: Emilio Lunghi
- 1914: Giuseppe Bernardoni
- 1915–1918: not held
- 1919: Angelo Vigani
- 1920: Adolfo Contoli
- 1921: Adolfo Contoli (2)
- 1922: Fortunato Braccini
- 1923: Carlo Scapin
- 1924: Luigi Facelli
- 1925: Luigi Facelli (2)
- 1926: Luigi Facelli (3)
- 1927: Luigi Facelli (4)
- 1928: Luigi Facelli (5)
- 1929: Luigi Facelli (6)
- 1930: Luigi Facelli (7)
- 1931: Luigi Facelli (8)
- 1932: Giordano Cumar
- 1933: Emilio Mori
- 1934: Mario Radaelli
- 1935: Luigi Facelli (9)
- 1936: Luigi Facelli (10)
- 1937: Emilio Mori (2)
- 1938: Luigi Facelli (11)
- 1939: Angelo Lualdi
- 1940: Giuseppe Pantone
- 1941: Ottavio Missoni
- 1942: Armando Filiput
- 1943: Guerino Colautti
- 1944: not held
- 1945: Luigi Paterlini
- 1946: Armando Filiput (2)
- 1947: Ottavio Missoni (2)
- 1948: Ottavio Missoni (3)
- 1949: Armando Filiput (3)
- 1950: Armando Filiput (4)
- 1951: Armando Filiput (5)
- 1952: Armando Filiput (6)
- 1953: Armando Filiput (7)
- 1954: Armando Filiput (8)
- 1955: Moreno Martini
- 1956: Franco Bettella
- 1957: Salvatore Morale
- 1958: Salvatore Morale (2)
- 1959: Moreno Martini (2)
- 1960: Salvatore Morale (3)
- 1961: Salvatore Morale (4)
- 1962: Luigi Carrozza
- 1963: Roberto Frinolli
- 1964: Roberto Frinolli (2)
- 1965: Roberto Frinolli (3)
- 1966: Roberto Frinolli (4)
- 1967: Alessandro Scatena
- 1968: Roberto Frinolli (5)
- 1969: Roberto Frinolli (6)
- 1970: Sergio Bello
- 1971: Giorgio Ballati
- 1972: Giorgio Ballati (2)
- 1973: Daniele Giovanardi
- 1974: Giorgio Ballati (3)
- 1975: Giorgio Ballati (4)
- 1976: Franco Mazzetti
- 1977: Lorenzo Brigante
- 1978: Giorgio Ballati (5)
- 1979: Fulvio Zorn
- 1980: Giorgio Ballati (6)
- 1981: Fulvio Zorn (2)
- 1982: Saverio Gellini
- 1983: Luca Cosi
- 1984: Stefano Bizzaglia
- 1985: Luca Cosi (2)
- 1986: Luca Cosi (3)
- 1987: Angelo Locci
- 1988: Luca Cosi (4)
- 1989: Fabrizio Mori
- 1990: Mauro Maurizi
- 1991: Fabrizio Mori (2)
- 1992: Enzo Franciosi
- 1993: Giorgio Frinolli
- 1994: Giorgio Frinolli (2)
- 1995: Laurent Ottoz
- 1996: Fabrizio Mori (3)
- 1997: Laurent Ottoz (2)
- 1998: Laurent Ottoz (3)
- 1999: Laurent Ottoz (4)
- 2000: Giorgio Frinolli (3)
- 2001: Laurent Ottoz (5)
- 2002: Laurent Ottoz (6)
- 2003: Gianni Carabelli
- 2004: Gianni Carabelli (2)
- 2005: Gianni Carabelli (3)
- 2006: Gianni Carabelli (4)
- 2007: Claudio Citterio
- 2008: Nicola Cascella
- 2009: Nicola Cascella (2)
- 2010: Giacomo Panizza
- 2011: José Bencosme
- 2012: José Bencosme (2)
- 2013: Eusebio Haliti
- 2014: Leonardo Capotosti
- 2015: Leonardo Capotosti (2)
- 2016: José Bencosme (3)
- 2017: Lorenzo Vergani
- 2018: José Bencosme (4)
- 2019: Alessandro Sibilio
- 2020: Mario Lambrughi
- 2021: Alessandro Sibilio (2)
- 2022: Mario Lambrughi (2)
- 2023: Mario Lambrughi (3)
- 2024: Giacomo Bertoncelli

==== 3000 m steeplechase ====
- 1923: Ernesto Ambrosini
- 1924: Antenore Negri
- 1925: Antenore Negri (2)
- 1926: Nello Bartolini
- 1927: Nello Bartolini (2)
- 1928: Angelo Davoli
- 1929: Giuseppe Venturi
- 1930: Angelo Davoli (2)
- 1931: Nello Bartolini (3)
- 1932: Nello Bartolini (4)
- 1933: Giuseppe Lippi
- 1934: Nello Bartolini (5)
- 1935: Giuseppe Lippi (2)
- 1936: Giuseppe Lippi (3)
- 1937: Ilario Ugolini
- 1938: Ferdinando Migliaccio
- 1939: Candido Parodi
- 1940: Giuseppe Lippi (4)
- 1941: Giovanni Cultrone
- 1942: Carlo Bertocchi
- 1943–1945: not held
- 1946: Renato Colosio
- 1947: Ilario Ugolini (2)
- 1948: Giuseppe Lippi (5)
- 1949: Ferdinando Migliaccio (2)
- 1950: Ilario Zanatta
- 1951: Vittorio Maggioni
- 1952: Vittorio Maggioni (2)
- 1953: Ivo Palleri
- 1954: Vittorio Maggioni (3)
- 1955: Valentino Manzutti
- 1956: Vincenzo Leone
- 1957: Vincenzo Leone (2)
- 1958: Alfredo Rizzo
- 1959: Onofrio Costa
- 1960: Enzo Volpi
- 1961: Gianfranco Sommaggio
- 1962: Gianfranco Sommaggio (2)
- 1963: Alfredo Rizzo (2)
- 1964: Alfredo Rizzo (3)
- 1965: Massimo Begnis
- 1966: Massimo Begnis (2)
- 1967: Giovanni Pizzi
- 1968: Brunello Bertolin
- 1969: Umberto Risi
- 1970: Umberto Risi (2)
- 1971: Francesco Valenti
- 1972: Franco Fava
- 1973: Franco Fava (2)
- 1974: Franco Fava (3)
- 1975: Franco Fava (4)
- 1976: Roberto Volpi
- 1977: Roberto Volpi (2)
- 1978: Roberto Volpi (3)
- 1979: Mariano Scartezzini
- 1980: Roberto Volpi (4)
- 1981: Mariano Scartezzini (2)
- 1982: Luciano Carchesio
- 1983: Mariano Scartezzini (3)
- 1984: Franco Boffi
- 1985: Francesco Panetta
- 1986: A. Lambruschini
- 1987: A. Lambruschini (2)
- 1988: Francesco Panetta (2)
- 1989: Angelo Carosi
- 1990: A. Lambruschini (3)
- 1991: Angelo Carosi (2)
- 1992: A. Lambruschini (4)
- 1993: Gianni Crepaldi
- 1994: A. Lambruschini (5)
- 1995: Alessandro Briana
- 1996: A. Lambruschini (6)
- 1997: Daniele Banchini
- 1998: Angelo Iannelli
- 1999: Stefano Ciallella
- 2000: Luciano Di Pardo
- 2001: Giuseppe Maffei
- 2002: Angelo Iannelli (2)
- 2003: Angelo Iannelli (3)
- 2004: Angelo Carosi (3)
- 2005: Yuri Floriani
- 2006: Angelo Iannelli (4)
- 2007: Yuri Floriani (2)
- 2008: Yuri Floriani (3)
- 2009: Matteo Villani
- 2010: Yuri Floriani (4)
- 2011: Yuri Floriani (5)
- 2012: Matteo Villani (2)
- 2013: Jamel Chatbi
- 2014: Patrick Nasti
- 2015: Jamel Chatbi (2)
- 2016: Yuri Floriani (6)
- 2017: Ala Zoghlami
- 2018: Leonardo Feletto
- 2019: Ahmed Abdelwahed
- 2020: Ala Zoghlami (2)
- 2021: Ala Zoghlami (3)
- 2022: Leonardo Feletto (2)
- 2023: Ala Zoghlami (4)
- 2024: Yassin Bouih

==== 10000 m walk ====
The 10,000 m walk on track ran until 2011. Since 2012 the race has been replaced with the 10 km walk on road.

- 1907: Arturo Balestrieri
- 1908: Angelo Claro
- 1909: Pietro Fontana
- 1910: Fernando Altimani
- 1911: Fernando Altimani (2)
- 1912: Fernando Altimani (3)
- 1913: Fernando Altimani (4)
- 1914: Giovanni Galli
- 1915–1918: not held
- 1919: Ugo Frigerio
- 1920: Ugo Frigerio (2)
- 1921: Ugo Frigerio (3)
- 1922: Armando Valente
- 1923: Ugo Frigerio (4)
- 1924: Ugo Frigerio (5)
- 1925: Ettore Gariboldi
- 1926: Armando Valente (2)
- 1927: Armando Valente (3)
- 1928: Armando Valente (4)
- 1929: Armando Valente (5)
- 1930: not held
- 1931: Ugo Frigerio (6)
- 1932–1936: not held
- 1937: Giovanni Andreini
- 1938: Luigi Peri
- 1939: Giuseppe Kressevich
- 1940: Giuseppe Kressevich (2)
- 1941: Giuseppe Kressevich (3)
- 1942: Giuseppe Kressevich (4)
- 1943: Giuseppe Kressevich (5)
- 1944: not held
- 1945: Giuseppe Kressevich (6)
- 1946: Pino Dordoni
- 1947: Pino Dordoni (2)
- 1948: Pino Dordoni (3)
- 1949: Pino Dordoni (4)
- 1950: Pino Dordoni (5)
- 1951: Pino Dordoni (6)
- 1952: Pino Dordoni (7)
- 1953: Pino Dordoni (8)
- 1954: Pino Dordoni (9)
- 1955: Pino Dordoni (10)
- 1956: Abdon Pamich
- 1957: Pino Dordoni (11)
- 1958: Abdon Pamich (2)
- 1959: Abdon Pamich (3)
- 1960: Abdon Pamich (4)
- 1961: Abdon Pamich (5)
- 1962: Abdon Pamich (6)
- 1963: Abdon Pamich (7)
- 1964: Abdon Pamich (8)
- 1965: Abdon Pamich (9)
- 1966: Abdon Pamich (10)
- 1967: Abdon Pamich (11)
- 1968: Abdon Pamich (12)
- 1969: Abdon Pamich (13)
- 1970–1978: not held
- 1979: Maurizio Damilano
- 1980: Carlo Mattioli
- 1981: Maurizio Damilano
- 1982: Maurizio Damilano (2)
- 1983: Maurizio Damilano (3)
- 1984: Maurizio Damilano (4)
- 1985: Maurizio Damilano (5)
- 1986: Carlo Mattioli (2)
- 1987: Maurizio Damilano (6)
- 1988: Giovanni De Benedictis
- 1989: G. De Benedictis (2)
- 1990: G. De Benedictis (3)
- 1991: G. De Benedictis (4)
- 1992: G. De Benedictis (5)
- 1993: G. De Benedictis (6)
- 1994: Michele Didoni
- 1995: G. De Benedictis (7)
- 1996: Michele Didoni (2)
- 1997: G. De Benedictis (8)
- 1998: Michele Didoni (3)
- 1999: Ivano Brugnetti
- 2000: Marco Giungi
- 2001: Michele Didoni (4)
- 2002: G. De Benedictis (9)
- 2003: Andrea Manfredini
- 2004: Lorenzo Civallero
- 2005: Enrico Lang
- 2006: Ivano Brugnetti (2)
- 2007: Alex Schwazer
- 2008: Ivano Brugnetti (3)
- 2009: Ivano Brugnetti (4)
- 2010: Alex Schwazer (2)
- 2011: Jean J. Nkouloukidi

=== Road ===
==== 10 km road ====
- 2010: Stefano Baldini
- 2011: Stefano Scaini
- 2012: Domenico Ricatti
- 2013: Mohamed Laqouahi
- 2014: Andrea Lalli
- 2105: Manuel Cominotto
- 2016: Marouan Razine
- 2017: Yassine Rachik
- 2018: Marco Salami
- 2019: Lorenzo Dini
- 2020: Not disputed
- 2021: Iliass Aouani
- 2022: Pietro Riva
- 2023: Pietro Riva

==== Half marathon ====
- 1897: Cesare Ferrari
- 1898: Ettore Zilia
- 1899: Ettore Zilia (2)
- 1900: Francesco Stobbone
- 1901: Giacomo Volpati
- 1902: Ettore Ferri
- 1903: Giacomo Volpati (2)
- 1904: not held
- 1905: Dorando Pietri
- 1906: Pericle Pagliani
- 1907: Dorando Pietri (2)
- 1908: Dorando Pietri (3)
- 1909: Armando Pagliani
- 1910: Pericle Pagliani (2)
- 1911: Adolfo Testoni
- 1912: Carlo Speroni
- 1913: Carlo Speroni (2)
- 1914: Carlo Speroni (3)
- 1915–1918: not held
- 1919: Ettore Blasi
- 1920: Ettore Blasi (2)
- 1921: Ettore Blasi (3)
- 1922: Ettore Blasi (4)
- 1923–1924: not held
- 1925: Vincenzo D'Amore
- 1926: Stefano Natale
- 1927: Luigi Rossini
- 1928: Giovanni Balbusso
- 1929: Luigi Rossini (2)
- 1930: Luigi Rossini (3)
- 1931: Spartaco Morelli
- 1932: Simone Paduano
- 1933–1936: not held
- 1937: Giovanni Balbusso (2)
- 1938: Umberto De Florentiis
- 1939: Savino Resia
- 1940: Savino Resia (2)
- 1941: Salvatore Costantino
- 1942: Ettore Padovani
- 1943: Salvatore Costantino (2)
- 1944: Romano Maffeis
- 1945: Romano Maffeis (2)
- 1946: Antonio Carta
- 1947: Salvatore Costantino (2)
- 1948: Pietro Balistrieri
- 1949: Pietro Balistrieri (2)
- 1950: Asfò Bussotti
- 1951: Egilberto Martufi
- 1952: Asfò Bussotti (2)
- 1953: Giacomo Peppicelli (2)
- 1954: Agostino Conti
- 1955: Edoardo Righi
- 1956: Rino Lavelli
- 1957: Giacomo Peppicelli (2)
- 1958: Silvio De Florentiis
- 1959: Silvio De Florentiis (2)
- 1960: Silvio De Florentiis (3)
- 1961: Antonio Ambu
- 1962: Antonio Ambu (2)
- 1963: Silvio De Florentiis (2)
- 1964: Antonio Ambu (3)
- 1965: Antonio Ambu (4)
- 1966: Antonio Ambu (5)
- 1967: Antonio Ambu (6)
- 1968: Antonio Ambu (7)
- 1969: Gioacchino De Palma
- 1970: Gioacchino De Palma (2)
- 1971: Francesco Amante
- 1972: Renato Martini
- 1973: Italo Tentorini
- 1974: Giuseppe Cindolo
- 1975: Paolo Accaputo
- 1976: Franco Fava
- 1977: Paolo Accaputo (2)
- 1978: Massimo Magnani
- 1979: Gianpaolo Messina
- 1980: Paolo Accaputo (3)
- 1981: Massimo Magnani (2)
- 1982: Alessandro Rastello
- 1983: Vito Basiliana
- 1984: Vito Basiliana (2)
- 1985: Loris Pimazzoni
- 1986: Salvatore Bettiol
- 1987: Davide Bergamini
- 1988: Salvatore Bettiol (2)
- 1989: Walter D'Urbano
- 1990: Gelindo Bordin
- 1991: Raffaello Alliegro
- 1992: Vincenzo Modica
- 1993: Vincenzo Modica (2)
- 1994: Vincenzo Modica (3)
- 1995: Stefano Baldini
- 1996: Danilo Goffi
- 1997: Francesco Ingargiola
- 1998: Stefano Baldini (2)
- 1999: Daniele Caimmi
- 2000: Rachid Berradi
- 2001: Stefano Baldini (3)
- 2002: Giuliano Battocletti
- 2003: Michele Gamba
- 2004: Stefano Baldini (4)
- 2005: Fabio Mascheroni
- 2006: Stefano Baldini (5)
- 2007: Giuliano Battocletti (2)
- 2008: Federico Simionato
- 2009: Stefano Baldini (6)
- 2010: Ruggero Pertile
- 2011: Francesco Bona
- 2012: Stefano La Rosa
- 2013: Gianmarco Buttazzo
- 2014: Daniele Meucci
- 2015: Andrea Lalli
- 2016: Daniele D'Onofrio
- 2017: Yassine Rachik
- 2018: Ahmed El Mazoury
- 2019: Nekagenet Crippa
- 2020: Daniele D'Onofrio (2)
- 2021: Iliass Aouani
- 2022: Yohanes Chiappinelli
- 2023: Nekagenet Crippa (2)

==== Marathon ====
- 1908: Umberto Blasi
- 1909: Umberto Blasi (2)
- 1910: Antonio Fraschini
- 1911: Orlando Cesaroni
- 1912: Giovanni Beltrandi
- 1913: Fernando Altimani (4)
- 1914: Angelo Malvicini
- 1915–1918: not held
- 1919: Valerio Arri
- 1920: Florestano Benedetti
- 1921: Florestano Benedetti (2)
- 1922: Angelo Malvicini (2)
- 1923: Ettore Blasi
- 1924: Romeo Bertini
- 1925: Attilio Conton
- 1926: Stefano Natale
- 1927: Luigi Rossini
- 1928: Luigi Prato
- 1929: Stefano Natale (2)
- 1930: Stefano Natale (3)
- 1931: Francesco Roccati
- 1932: Michele Fanelli
- 1933: Aurelio Genghini
- 1934: Michele Fanelli (2)
- 1935: Luigi Rossini (2)
- 1936: Giovanni Bulzone
- 1937: Aurelio Genghini (2)
- 1938: Francesco Raccati
- 1939: Francesco Raccati (2)
- 1940: Salvatore Costantino
- 1941: Romano Maffeis
- 1942: Francesco Raccati (3)
- 1943–1944: not held
- 1945: Ettore Padovani
- 1946: Stefano Natale (4)
- 1947: Salvatore Costantino (2)
- 1948: Renato Braghini
- 1949: Cristofano Sestini
- 1950: Gaetano Marzano
- 1951: Asfò Bussotti
- 1952: Egilberto Martufi
- 1953: Antonio Sabelli
- 1954: Antidoro Berti
- 1955: Antidoro Berti (2)
- 1956: Rino Lavelli
- 1957: Rino Lavelli (2)
- 1958: Francesco Perrone
- 1959: Enrico Massante
- 1960: Rino Lavelli
- 1961: Francesco Perrone (2)
- 1962: Antonio Ambu
- 1963: Giorgio Jegmer
- 1964: Antonio Ambu (2)
- 1965: Antonio Ambu (3)
- 1966: Antonio Ambu (4)
- 1967: Antonio Ambu (5)
- 1968: Antonio Ambu (6)
- 1969: Antonio Ambu (7)
- 1970: Toni Ritsch
- 1971: Giovanbattista Bassi
- 1972: Francesco Amante
- 1973: Paolo Accaputo
- 1974: Giuseppe Cindolo
- 1975: Giuseppe Cindolo (2)
- 1976: Giuseppe Cindolo (3)
- 1977: Paolo Accaputo (2)
- 1978: Massimo Magnani
- 1979: Michelangelo Arena
- 1980: Michelangelo Arena (2)
- 1981: Giampaolo Messina
- 1982: Giuseppe Gerbi
- 1983: Giuseppe Gerbi (2)
- 1984: Gianni Poli
- 1985: Osvaldo Faustini
- 1986: Osvaldo Faustini (2)
- 1987: Salvatore Bettiol
- 1988: Carlo Terzer
- 1989: Marco Milani
- 1990: Severino Bernardini
- 1991: Salvatore Bettiol (2)
- 1992: Giacomo Tagliaferri
- 1993: Walter D'Urbano
- 1994: Salvatore Nicosia
- 1995: Danilo Goffi
- 1996: Franco Togni
- 1997: Massimiliano Ingrami
- 1998: Migidio Bourifa
- 1999: Roberto Barbi
- 2000: Roberto Barbi (2)
- 2001: Angelo Carosi
- 2002: Fabio Rinaldi
- 2003: Angelo Carosi (2)
- 2004: Roberto Barbi (3)
- 2005: Vincenzo Modica
- 2006: Ruggero Pertile
- 2007: Migidio Bourifa (2)
- 2008: Alberico Di Cecco
- 2009: Migidio Bourifa (3)
- 2010: Migidio Bourifa (4)
- 2011: Giovanni Gualdi
- 2012: Migidio Bourifa (5)
- 2013: Ruggero Pertile (2)
- 2014: Danilo Goffi (2)
- 2015: Dario Santoro
- 2016: Ahmed Nasef
- 2017: Ahmed Nasef (2)
- 2018: Alessio Terrasi
- 2019: René Cunéaz
- 2020: Giovanni Grano
- 2021: Antonino Lollo
- 2022: Alessandro Giacobazzi
- 2023: Francesco Agostini
- 2024: Giacomo Esposito
- 2025: Lhoussaine Oukhrid

==== 10 km walk ====
The 10 km walk on road has been held since 2012, previously the race was run on 10,000 m walk on track.

- 2012: Giorgio Rubino
- 2013: Matteo Giupponi
- 2014: Giorgio Rubino (2)
- 2015: Federico Tontodonati
- 2016: Francesco Fortunato
- 2017: Federico Tontodonati (2)
- 2018: Massimo Stano
- 2019: Gianluca Picchiottino
- 2020: Francesco Fortunato (2)
- 2021: Francesco Fortunato (3)
- 2022: Francesco Fortunato (4)
- 2023: Francesco Fortunato (5)
- 2024: Andrea Agrusti

==== 20 km walk ====
- 1947: Pino Dordoni
- 1948: Pino Dordoni (2)
- 1949: Pino Dordoni (3)
- 1950: Pino Dordoni (4)
- 1951: Salvatore Cascino
- 1952: Pino Dordoni (5)
- 1953: Pino Dordoni (6)
- 1954: Pino Dordoni (7)
- 1955: Pino Dordoni (8)
- 1956: Pino Dordoni (9)
- 1957: Pino Dordoni (10)
- 1958: Abdon Pamich
- 1959: Abdon Pamich (2)
- 1960: Abdon Pamich (3)
- 1961: Abdon Pamich (4)
- 1962: Abdon Pamich (5)
- 1963: Abdon Pamich (6)
- 1964: Abdon Pamich (7)
- 1965: Abdon Pamich (8)
- 1966: Abdon Pamich (9)
- 1967: Abdon Pamich (10)
- 1968: Abdon Pamich (11)
- 1969: Abdon Pamich (12)
- 1970: Vittorio Visini
- 1971: Abdon Pamich (13)
- 1972: Armando Zambaldo
- 1973: Armando Zambaldo (2)
- 1974: Armando Zambaldo (3)
- 1975: Armando Zambaldo (4)
- 1976: Vittorio Canini
- 1977: Roberto Buccione
- 1978: Maurizio Damilano
- 1979: Giorgio Damilano
- 1980: Maurizio Damilano (2)
- 1981: Maurizio Damilano (3)
- 1982: Maurizio Damilano (4)
- 1983: Maurizio Damilano (5)
- 1984: Maurizio Damilano (6)
- 1985: Maurizio Damilano (7)
- 1986: Maurizio Damilano (8)
- 1987: Carlo Mattioli
- 1988: Maurizio Damilano (9)
- 1989: Giovanni De Benedictis
- 1990: Giovanni De Benedictis (2)
- 1991: Giovanni De Benedictis (3)
- 1992: Maurizio Damilano (10)
- 1993: Giovanni De Benedictis (4)
- 1994: Giuseppe De Gaetano
- 1995: Michele Didoni
- 1996: Giovanni De Benedictis (5)
- 1997: Giovanni De Benedictis (6)
- 1998: Marco Giungi
- 1999: Giovanni De Benedictis (7)
- 2000: Marco Giungi (2)
- 2001: Giovanni De Benedictis (8)
- 2002: Marco Giungi (3)
- 2003: Ivano Brugnetti
- 2004: Ivano Brugnetti (2)
- 2005: Giorgio Rubino
- 2006: Fortunato D'Onofrio
- 2007: Alex Schwazer
- 2008: Alex Schwazer (2)
- 2009: Jean Jacques Nkouloukidi
- 2010: Jean Jacques Nkouloukidi (2)
- 2011: Marco De Luca
- 2012: Federico Tontodonati
- 2013: Vito Di Bari
- 2014: Giorgio Rubino
- 2015: Massimo Stano
- 2016: Federico Tontodonati (2)
- 2017: Francesco Fortunato
- 2018: Massimo Stano (2)
- 2019: Francesco Fortunato (2)
- 2020: not diputed due Covid
- 2021: Federico Tontodonati (3)
- 2022: Gianluca Picchiottino
- 2023: Francesco Fortunato (3)
- 2024: Francesco Fortunato (4)

==== 50 km walk, 35 km walk ====
From 2022, in accordance with the international competitions of World Athletics and European Athletic Association, the distance becomes 35 km.

- 1908: Antonio Navoni
- 1909: Silla Del Sole
- 1910: Italo Berta
- 1911: not held
- 1912: Donato Pavesi
- 1913: Giovanni Brunelli
- 1914: Donato Pavesi (2)
- 1915–1918: not held
- 1919: Giusto Umeck
- 1920: Giusto Umeck (2)
- 1921: Donato Pavesi (3)
- 1922: Giovanni Brunelli (2)
- 1923: Giovanni Brunelli (3)
- 1924: Donato Pavesi (4)
- 1925: Donato Pavesi (5)
- 1926: Attilio Callegari
- 1927: Giusto Umeck (3)
- 1928: Romano Vecchietti
- 1929: Romano Peggiolini
- 1930: Francesco Pretti
- 1931: Ettore Rivolta
- 1932: Umberto Olivoni
- 1933: Umberto Olivoni (2)
- 1934: Ettore Rivolta (2)
- 1935: Ettore Rivolta (3)
- 1936: Ettore Rivolta (4)
- 1937: Giuseppe Gobbato
- 1938: Cosimo Puttilli
- 1939: Ettore Rivolta (5)
- 1940: Alighiero Guglielmi
- 1941: Giuseppe Malaspina
- 1942: Alighiero Guglielmi (2)
- 1943–1944: not held
- 1945: Giuseppe Kressevich (6)
- 1946: Valentino Bertolini
- 1947: Cosimo Puttilli (2)
- 1948: Valentino Bertolini (2)
- 1949: Pino Dordoni
- 1950: Pino Dordoni (2)
- 1951: Salvatore Cascino
- 1952: Pino Dordoni (3)
- 1953: Pino Dordoni (4)
- 1954: Pino Dordoni (5)
- 1955: Abdon Pamich
- 1956: Abdon Pamich (2)
- 1957: Abdon Pamich (3)
- 1958: Abdon Pamich (4)
- 1959: Abdon Pamich (5)
- 1960: Abdon Pamich (6)
- 1961: Abdon Pamich (7)
- 1962: Abdon Pamich (8)
- 1963: Abdon Pamich (9)
- 1964: Abdon Pamich (10)
- 1965: Abdon Pamich (11)
- 1966: Abdon Pamich (12)
- 1967: Abdon Pamich (13)
- 1968: Abdon Pamich (14)
- 1969: Sante Mancini
- 1970: Vittorio Visini
- 1971: Vittorio Visini (2)
- 1972: Vittorio Visini (3)
- 1973: Vittorio Visini (4)
- 1974: Vittorio Visini (5)
- 1975: Vittorio Visini (6)
- 1976: Paolo Grecucci
- 1977: Franco Vecchio
- 1978: Paolo Grecucci (2)
- 1979: Domenico Carpentieri
- 1980: Domenico Carpentieri
- 1981: Vittorio Visini (7)
- 1982: Graziano Morotti
- 1983: Raffaello Ducceschi
- 1984: Raffaello Ducceschi (2)
- 1985: Maurizio Damilano
- 1986: Maurizio Damilano (2)
- 1987: Giovanni Perricelli
- 1988: Raffaello Ducceschi (3)
- 1989: Giovanni Perricelli (2)
- 1990: Maurizio Damilano (3)
- 1991: Giovanni Perricelli (3)
- 1992: Giovanni Perricelli (4)
- 1993: Giuseppe De Gaetano
- 1994: Giovanni De Benedictis
- 1995: Alessandro Mistretta
- 1996: G. De Benedictis (2)
- 1997: Giovanni Perricelli (5)
- 1998: Michele Didoni
- 1999: Marco Giungi
- 2000: Francesco Galdenzi
- 2001: Marco Giungi (2)
- 2002: Marco Giungi (3)
- 2003: Marco Giungi (4)
- 2004: Marco Giungi (5)
- 2005: Alex Schwazer
- 2006: Marco De Luca
- 2007: Alex Schwazer (2)
- 2008: Alex Schwazer (3)
- 2009: Marco De Luca (2)
- 2010: Alex Schwazer (4)
- 2011: Federico Tontodonati
- 2012: Federico Tontodonati (2)
- 2013: not held
- 2014: Matteo Giupponi
- 2015: Federico Tontodonati (3)
- 2016: Michele Antonelli
- 2017: Stefano Chiesa
- 2018: Leonardo Dei Tos
- 2019: Michele Antonelli (2)
- 2020: not diputed due Covid
- 2021: Teodorico Caporaso
- 2022: Matteo Giupponi (2)
- 2023: Riccardo Orsoni

=== Field ===
==== Long jump ====
Multiwinners
Athlete	Wins
Attilio Bravi	8
Virgilio Tommasi; Arturo Maffei; Filippo Randazzo	6

- 1913: Antonio Garimoldi
- 1914: Oreste Zaccagna
- 1915/1918: not held
- 1919: Arturo Nespoli
- 1920: Adolfo Contoli
- 1921: Ottorino Aloisio
- 1922: Adolfo Contoli
- 1923: Arturo Nespoli
- 1924: Virgilio Tommasi
- 1925: Virgilio Tommasi
- 1926: Virgilio Tommasi
- 1927: Enrico Torre
- 1928: Virgilio Tommasi
- 1929: Virgilio Tommasi
- 1930: Arturo Maffei
- 1931: Virgilio Tommasi
- 1932: Arturo Maffei
- 1933: Francesco Tabai
- 1934: Francesco Tabai
- 1935: Arturo Maffei
- 1936: Arturo Maffei
- 1937: Arturo Maffei
- 1938: Arturo Maffei
- 1939: Arturo Maffei
- 1940: Arturo Maffei
- 1941: Fulvio Pellarini
- 1942: Gino Pederzani
- 1943: Aldo Vallon
- 1944: not held
- 1945: Aldo Vallon
- 1946: Alessandro Acerbi
- 1947: Lorenzo Toso
- 1948: Ugo Ardizzone
- 1949: Ugo Ardizzone
- 1950: Ugo Ardizzone
- 1951: Mario Naj Oleari
- 1952: Attilio Bravi
- 1953: Gianpiero Druetto
- 1954: Attilio Bravi
- 1955: Attilio Bravi
- 1956: Attilio Bravi and Valerio Colatore
- 1957: Attilio Bravi
- 1958: Attilio Bravi
- 1959: Attilio Bravi
- 1960: Attilio Bravi
- 1961: Raffaele Piras
- 1962: Giorgio Bortolozzi
- 1963: Raffaele Piras
- 1964: Giorgio Bortolozzi
- 1965: Marco Fornaciari
- 1966: Pierluigi Gatti
- 1967: Pasquale Santoro
- 1968: Giuseppe Gentile
- 1969: Carlo Arrighi
- 1970: Domenico Fontanella
- 1971: Ildebrando Fozzi
- 1972: Claudio Hernandez
- 1973: Carlo Molinaris
- 1974: Carlo Molinaris
- 1975: Domenico Fontanella
- 1976: Roberto Veglia
- 1977: Maurizio Siega
- 1978: Maurizio Maffi
- 1979: Maurizio Siega
- 1980: Maurizio Maffi
- 1981: Giovanni Evangelisti
- 1982: Giovanni Evangelisti
- 1983: Marco Piochi
- 1984: Claudio Cherubini
- 1985: Claudio Cherubini
- 1986: Giovanni Evangelisti
- 1987: Giuseppe Bertozzi
- 1988: Milko Campus
- 1989: Milko Campus
- 1990: Giuseppe Bertozzi
- 1991: Fausto Frigerio
- 1992: Giovanni Evangelisti
- 1993: Simone Bianchi
- 1994: Milko Campus
- 1995: Milko Campus
- 1996: Simone Bianchi
- 1997: Diego Boschiero
- 1998: Simone Bianchi
- 1999: Roberto Coltri
- 2000: Bruno Frinolli
- 2001: Nicola Trentin
- 2002: Nicola Trentin
- 2003: Nicola Trentin
- 2004: Stefano Dacastello
- 2005: Stefano Dacastello
- 2006: Ferdinando Iucolano
- 2007: Andrew Howe
- 2008: Stefano Tremigliozzi
- 2009: Alessio Guarini
- 2010: Andrew Howe
- 2011: Stefano Dacastello
- 2012: Fabrizio Schembri
- 2013: Alessio Guarini
- 2014: Emanuele Catania
- 2015: Filippo Randazzo
- 2016: Marcell Jacobs
- 2017: Filippo Randazzo
- 2018: Filippo Randazzo
- 2019: Filippo Randazzo
- 2021: Filippo Randazzo
- 2022: Elias Sagheddu
- 2023: Filippo Randazzo
- 2024: Kareem Mersal

==== Triple jump ====
Multiwinners
Athlete	Wins
Dario Badinelli	10
Fabrizio Donato	8
Paolo Camossi	7
Giuseppe Gentile	6

- 1913: Antonio Garimoldi
- 1914: Antonio Garimoldi
- 1915–1918: not held
- 1919: Apollino Barelli
- 1920: Apollino Barelli
- 1921: Luigi De Micheli
- 1922: Luigi De Micheli
- 1923: Luigi Facelli
- 1924: Mario Trabucco
- 1925: Mario Trabucco
- 1926: Mario Trabucco
- 1927: Mario Trabucco
- 1928: Plinio Palmano
- 1929: Luigi Facelli
- 1930: Plinio Palmano
- 1931: Plinio Palmano
- 1932: Folco Guglielmi
- 1933: Folco Guglielmi
- 1934: Folco Guglielmi
- 1935: Giuseppe Pende
- 1936: Francesco Tabai
- 1937: Francesco Tabai
- 1938: Mario Taddia
- 1939: Mario Taddia
- 1940: Alessandro Bettaglio
- 1941: Fulvio Pellarini
- 1942: Giuseppe Cuccotti
- 1943: Piero Pieracci
- 1944: not held
- 1945: Guido Cavaler
- 1946: Fulvio Pellarini
- 1947: Antonio Casarotti
- 1948: Ferdinando Sormani
- 1949: Enrico Tosi
- 1950: Ferdinando Simi
- 1951: Ferdinando Sormani
- 1952: Adriano Bertacca
- 1953: Alberto Guzzi
- 1954: Stefano Bonsignore
- 1955: Antonio Trogu
- 1956: Ennio Evangelio
- 1957: Pierluigi Gatti
- 1958: Enzo Cavalli
- 1959: Enzo Cavalli
- 1960: Pierluigi Gatti
- 1961: Enzo Cavalli
- 1962: Enzo Cavalli
- 1963: Rinaldo Camaioni
- 1964: Pierluigi Gatti
- 1965: Giuseppe Gentile
- 1966: Giuseppe Gentile
- 1967: Pierluigi Gatti
- 1968: Giuseppe Gentile
- 1969: Rinaldo Camaioni
- 1970: Giuseppe Gentile
- 1971: Giuseppe Gentile
- 1972: Ezio Buzzelli
- 1973: Claudio Moretti
- 1974: Ezio Buzzelli
- 1975: Ruggero Consorte
- 1976: Paolo Piapan
- 1977: Roberto Mazzucato
- 1978: Paolo Piapan
- 1979: Roberto Mazzucato
- 1980: Alessandro Ussi
- 1981: Paolo Piapan
- 1982: Roberto Mazzucato
- 1983: Dario Badinelli
- 1984: Dario Badinelli
- 1985: Dario Badinelli
- 1986: Dario Badinelli
- 1987: Dario Badinelli
- 1988: Dario Badinelli
- 1989: Dario Badinelli
- 1990: Dario Badinelli
- 1991: Dario Badinelli
- 1992: Dario Badinelli
- 1993: Andrea Matarazzo
- 1994: Maurizio Gifaldi
- 1995: Andrea Matarazzo
- 1996: Paolo Camossi
- 1997: Paolo Camossi
- 1998: Paolo Camossi
- 1999: Paolo Camossi
- 2000: Fabrizio Donato
- 2001: Paolo Camossi
- 2002: Salvatore Morello
- 2003: Paolo Camossi
- 2004: Fabrizio Donato
- 2005: Paolo Camossi
- 2006: Fabrizio Donato
- 2007: Fabrizio Donato
- 2008: Fabrizio Donato
- 2009: Fabrizio Schembri
- 2010: Fabrizio Donato
- 2011: Fabrizio Donato
- 2012: Daniele Greco
- 2013: Fabrizio Schembri
- 2014: Fabrizio Schembri
- 2015: Fabrizio Donato
- 2016: Daniele Cavazzani
- 2017: Daniele Cavazzani
- 2018: Fabrizio Schembri
- 2019: Samuele Cerro
- 2020: Andrea Dallavalle
- 2021: Tobia Bocchi
- 2022: Andrea Dallavalle
- 2023: Andy Diaz
- 2024: Andrea Dallavalle

==== High jump ====
Multiwinners
Athlete	Wins
Alfredo Campagner	8
Gianmarco Tamberi	6
Giuseppe Palmieri; Angelo Tommasi	5
Erminio Azzaro	4

- 1913: Carlo Andreoli
- 1914: Carlo Andreoli
- 1915–1918: not held
- 1919: Pierino Pisati
- 1920: Pierino Pisati (2)
- 1921: Carlo Ghiringhelli
- 1922: Carlo Ghiringhelli (2)
- 1923: Giuseppe Pagani
- 1924: Giuseppe Palmieri
- 1925: Giuseppe Palmieri (2)
- 1926: Giuseppe Palmieri (3)
- 1927: Giuseppe Palmieri (4)
- 1928: Giuseppe Palmieri (5)
- 1929: Pio Pacchioni
- 1930: Edgardo Degli Espositi
- 1931: Angelo Tommasi
- 1932: Angelo Tommasi (2)
- 1933: Angelo Tommasi (3)
- 1934: Renato Dotti
- 1935: Angelo Tommasi (4)
- 1936: Angelo Tommasi (5)
- 1937: Eugenio Gasti
- 1938: Renato Dotti (2)
- 1939: Franco Colombini
- 1940: Alfredo Campagner
- 1941: Alfredo Campagner (2)
- 1942: Alfredo Campagner (3)
- 1943: Alfredo Campagner (4)
- 1944: not held
- 1945: Alfredo Campagner (5)
- 1946: Alfredo Campagner (6)
- 1947: Alfredo Campagner (7)
- 1948: Ovidio Bernes
- 1949: Ovidio Bernes (2)
- 1950: Albano Albanese
- 1951: Alfredo Campagner (8)
- 1952: Carlo Marchisio
- 1953: Pierluigi Sara
- 1954: Gianmario Roveraro
- 1955: Gianmario Roveraro (2)
- 1956: Gianmario Roveraro (3)
- 1957: Gianpiero Cordovani
- 1958: Gianpiero Cordovani (2)
- 1959: Gianpiero Cordovani (3)
- 1960: Brunello Martini
- 1961: Walter Zamparelli
- 1962: Roberto Galli
- 1963: Roberto Galli (2)
- 1964: Vittoriano Drovandi
- 1965: Vittoriano Drovandi (2)
- 1966: Erminio Azzaro
- 1967: Vittoriano Drovandi (3)
- 1968: Gian Marco Schivo
- 1969: Erminio Azzaro (2)
- 1970: Erminio Azzaro (3)
- 1971: Erminio Azzaro (4)
- 1972: Gian Marco Schivo (2)
- 1973: Enzo Del Forno
- 1974: Enzo Del Forno (2)
- 1975: Enzo Del Forno (3)
- 1976: Lorenzo Bianchi
- 1977: Rodolfo Bergamo
- 1978: Rodolfo Bergamo (2)
- 1979: Massimo Di Giorgio
- 1980: Massimo Di Giorgio (2)
- 1981: Oscar Raise
- 1982: Massimo Di Giorgio (3)
- 1983: Gianni Davito
- 1984: Paolo Borghi
- 1985: Luca Toso
- 1986: Gianni Davito (2)
- 1987: Daniele Pagani
- 1988: Luca Toso (2)
- 1989: Marcello Benvenuti
- 1990: Daniele Pagani (2)
- 1991: Fabrizio Borellini
- 1992: Roberto Ferrari
- 1993: Ettore Ceresoli
- 1994: Roberto Ferrari (2)
- 1995: Ettore Ceresoli (2)
- 1996: Alessandro Canale
- 1997: Alessandro Canale (2)
- 1998: Ivan Bernasconi
- 1999: Ivan Bernasconi (2)
- 2000: Alessandro Talotti
- 2001: Giulio Ciotti
- 2002: Giulio Ciotti (2)
- 2003: Andrea Bettinelli
- 2004: Alessandro Talotti (2)
- 2005: Nicola Ciotti
- 2006: Giulio Ciotti (3)
- 2007: Filippo Campioli
- 2008: Filippo Campioli (2)
- 2009: Nicola Ciotti (2)
- 2010: Filippo Campioli
- 2011: Silvano Chesani (3)
- 2012: Gianmarco Tamberi
- 2013: Marco Fassinotti
- 2014: Gianmarco Tamberi (2)
- 2015: Marco Fassinotti (2)
- 2016: Gianmarco Tamberi (3)
- 2017: Eugenio Meloni
- 2018: Gianmarco Tamberi (4)
- 2019: Stefano Sottile
- 2020: Gianmarco Tamberi (5)
- 2021: Marco Fassinotti (3)
- 2022: Gianmarco Tamberi (6)
- 2023: Stefano Sottile (2)
- 2024: Stefano Sottile (3)

==== Pole vault ====
Multiwinners
Athlete	Wins
Renato Dionisi	10
Danilo Innocenti; Giorgio Piantella	8
Giacinto Lambiasi; Mario Romeo; Edmondo Ballotta	6

- 1913: Francesco Ventura
- 1914: Giacomo Erba
- 1915–1918: not held
- 1919: Alfonso Butti
- 1920: Giacinto Lambiasi
- 1921: Giacinto Lambiasi
- 1922: Adolfo Contoli
- 1923: Emilio Pagetti
- 1924: Giacinto Lambiasi
- 1925: Giacinto Lambiasi
- 1926: Giacinto Lambiasi
- 1927: Danilo Innocenti
- 1928: Danilo Innocenti
- 1929: Giacinto Lambiasi
- 1930: Danilo Innocenti
- 1931: Danilo Innocenti
- 1932: Danilo Innocenti
- 1933: Danilo Innocenti
- 1934: Danilo Innocenti
- 1935: Danilo Innocenti
- 1936: Danilo Innocenti
- 1937: Danilo Innocenti
- 1938: Mario Romeo
- 1939: Mario Romeo
- 1940: Umberto Ballerini
- 1941: Dino Conchi
- 1942: Dino Conchi
- 1943: Mario Romeo
- 1944: not held
- 1945: Mario Romeo
- 1946: Felice Corti
- 1947: Mario Romeo
- 1948: Carlo Rinaldi
- 1949: Franco Fano
- 1950: Mario Romeo
- 1951: Giulio Chiesa
- 1952: Edmondo Ballotta
- 1953: Giulio Chiesa
- 1954: Edmondo Ballotta
- 1955: Edmondo Ballotta
- 1956: Edmondo Ballotta
- 1957: Edmondo Ballotta
- 1958: Edmondo Ballotta
- 1959: Giulio Chiesa
- 1960: Angelo Baronchelli
- 1961: Mario Gaspari
- 1962: Pietro Scaglia
- 1963: Franco Sar
- 1964: Renato Dionisi
- 1965: Renato Dionisi
- 1966: Renato Dionisi
- 1967: Renato Dionisi
- 1968: Renato Dionisi
- 1969: Renato Dionisi
- 1970: Renato Dionisi
- 1971: Renato Dionisi
- 1972: Silvio Fraquelli
- 1973: Silvio Fraquelli
- 1974: Silvio Fraquelli
- 1975: Silvio Fraquelli
- 1976: Silvio Fraquelli
- 1977: Renato Dionisi
- 1978: Renato Dionisi
- 1979: Domenico D'Alisera
- 1980: Vincenzo Bellone
- 1981: Vincenzo Bellone
- 1982: Mauro Barella
- 1983: Corrado Alagona
- 1984: Mauro Barella
- 1985: Mauro Barella
- 1986: Gianni Stecchi
- 1987: Gianni Stecchi
- 1988: Marco Andreini
- 1989: Marco Andreini
- 1990: Gianni Iapichino
- 1991: Gianni Iapichino
- 1992: Gianni Iapichino
- 1993: Massimo Allevi
- 1994: Andrea Pegoraro
- 1995: Andrea Pegoraro
- 1996: Claudio Avogaro
- 1997: Fabio Pizzolato
- 1998: Andrea Giannini
- 1999: Maurilio Mariani
- 2000: Maurilio Mariani
- 2001: Ruben Scotti
- 2002: Ruben Scotti
- 2003: Fabio Pizzolato
- 2004: Maurilio Mariani
- 2005: Giorgio Piantella
- 2006: Giorgio Piantella
- 2007: Matteo Rubbiani
- 2008: Giorgio Piantella
- 2009: Giorgio Piantella
- 2010: Giorgio Piantella
- 2011: Sergio D'Orio
- 2012: Claudio Stecchi
- 2013: Claudio Stecchi
- 2014: Giorgio Piantella
- 2015: Claudio Stecchi
- 2016: Giorgio Piantella
- 2017: Giorgio Piantella
- 2018: Claudio Stecchi
- 2019: Max Mandusic
- 2020: Max Mandusic
- 2021: Ivan De Angelis
- 2022: Max Mandusic
- 2023: Simone Bertelli
- 2024: Federico Biancoli

==== Shot put ====
Multiwinners
Athlete	Wins
Angiolo Profeti	15
Silvano Meconi	13
Paolo Dal Soglio	12
Alessandro Andrei	8
Albino Pighi	6

- 1913: Giuseppe Tugnoli
- 1914: Giuseppe Tugnoli
- 1915–1918: not held
- 1919: Aurelio Lenzi
- 1920: Giuseppe Tugnoli
- 1921: Aurelio Lenzi
- 1922: Oprando Bottura
- 1923: Giuseppe Tugnoli
- 1924: Albino Pighi
- 1925: Albino Pighi
- 1926: Albino Pighi
- 1927: Clemente Romanò
- 1928: Albino Pighi
- 1929: Natale Mosca
- 1930: Albino Pighi
- 1931: Albino Pighi
- 1932: not held
- 1933: Cesare Garulli
- 1934: Lauro Bononcini
- 1935: Lauro Bononcini
- 1936: Gianni Reggio
- 1937: Ruggero Biancani
- 1938: Angiolo Profeti
- 1939: Angiolo Profeti
- 1940: Angiolo Profeti
- 1941: Angiolo Profeti
- 1942: Angiolo Profeti
- 1943: Enea Bertocchi
- 1944: not held
- 1945: Angiolo Profeti
- 1946: Angiolo Profeti
- 1947: Angiolo Profeti
- 1948: Angiolo Profeti
- 1949: Angiolo Profeti
- 1950: Angiolo Profeti
- 1951: Angiolo Profeti
- 1952: Angiolo Profeti
- 1953: Angiolo Profeti
- 1954: Angiolo Profeti
- 1955: Silvano Meconi
- 1956: Silvano Meconi
- 1957: Silvano Meconi
- 1958: Silvano Meconi
- 1959: Silvano Meconi
- 1960: Silvano Meconi
- 1961: Silvano Meconi
- 1962: Silvano Meconi
- 1963: Silvano Meconi
- 1964: Silvano Meconi
- 1965: Silvano Meconi
- 1966: Michele Sorrenti
- 1967: Silvano Meconi
- 1968: Silvano Meconi
- 1969: Flavio Asta
- 1970: Renato Bergonzoni
- 1971: Renato Bergonzoni
- 1972: Michele Sorrenti
- 1973: Michele Sorrenti
- 1974: Flavio Asta
- 1975: Angelo Groppelli
- 1976: Marco Montelatici
- 1977: Marco Montelatici
- 1978: Angelo Groppelli
- 1979: Angelo Groppelli
- 1980: Angelo Groppelli
- 1981: Luigi De Santis
- 1982: Marco Montelatici
- 1983: Alessandro Andrei
- 1984: Alessandro Andrei
- 1985: Alessandro Andrei
- 1986: Alessandro Andrei
- 1987: Marco Montelatici
- 1988: Marco Montelatici
- 1989: Alessandro Andrei
- 1990: Alessandro Andrei
- 1991: Alessandro Andrei
- 1992: Alessandro Andrei
- 1993: Luciano Zerbini
- 1994: Paolo Dal Soglio
- 1995: Paolo Dal Soglio
- 1996: Paolo Dal Soglio
- 1997: Corrado Fantini
- 1998: Paolo Dal Soglio
- 1999: Paolo Dal Soglio
- 2000: Paolo Dal Soglio
- 2001: Paolo Dal Soglio
- 2002: Paolo Dal Soglio
- 2003: Paolo Dal Soglio
- 2004: Paolo Dal Soglio
- 2005: Marco Dodoni
- 2006: Paolo Capponi
- 2007: Paolo Capponi
- 2008: Paolo Capponi
- 2009: Marco Di Maggio
- 2010: Andrea Ricci
- 2011: Paolo Dal Soglio
- 2012: Paolo Dal Soglio
- 2013: Marco Dodoni
- 2014: Daniele Secci
- 2015: Daniele Secci
- 2016: Sebastiano Bianchetti
- 2017: Sebastiano Bianchetti
- 2018: Sebastiano Bianchetti
- 2019: Leonardo Fabbri
- 2020: Leonardo Fabbri
- 2021: Nick Ponzio
- 2022: Nick Ponzio
- 2023: Leonardo Fabbri
- 2024: Leonardo Fabbri

==== Discus throw ====
Multiwinners
Athlete	Wins
Adolfo Consolini	15
Silvano Simeon; Hannes Kirchler	10
Diego Fortuna	8
Giovanni Faloci	7
Albino Pighi; Marco Martino	6

- 1913: Aurelio Lenzi
- 1914: Giuseppe Tugnoli
- 1915–1918: not held
- 1919: Aurelio Lenzi
- 1920: Bruno De Lorenzi
- 1921: Aurelio Lenzi
- 1922: Giuseppe Tugnoli
- 1923: Giuseppe Tugnoli
- 1924: Albino Pighi
- 1925: Albino Pighi
- 1926: Albino Pighi
- 1927: Camillo Zemi
- 1928: Albino Pighi
- 1929: Camillo Zemi
- 1930: Albino Pighi
- 1931: Albino Pighi
- 1932: Benvenuto Mignani
- 1933: Luigi Ponzoni
- 1934: Giorgio Oberweger
- 1935: Ruggero Biancani
- 1936: Giorgio Oberweger
- 1937: Giorgio Oberweger
- 1938: Giorgio Oberweger
- 1939: Adolfo Consolini
- 1940: Angiolo Profeti
- 1941: Adolfo Consolini
- 1942: Adolfo Consolini
- 1943: Giuseppe Tosi
- 1944: not held
- 1945: Adolfo Consolini
- 1946: Giuseppe Tosi
- 1947: Giuseppe Tosi
- 1948: Giuseppe Tosi
- 1949: Adolfo Consolini
- 1950: Adolfo Consolini
- 1951: Giuseppe Tosi
- 1952: Adolfo Consolini
- 1953: Adolfo Consolini
- 1954: Adolfo Consolini
- 1955: Adolfo Consolini
- 1956: Adolfo Consolini
- 1957: Adolfo Consolini
- 1958: Adolfo Consolini
- 1959: Adolfo Consolini
- 1960: Adolfo Consolini
- 1961: Carmelo Rado
- 1962: Gaetano Dalla Pria
- 1963: Franco Grossi
- 1964: Gaetano Dalla Pria
- 1965: Franco Grossi
- 1966: Silvano Simeon
- 1967: Silvano Simeon
- 1968: Gilberto Ferrini
- 1969: Silvano Simeon
- 1970: Silvano Simeon
- 1971: Silvano Simeon
- 1972: Silvano Simeon
- 1973: Silvano Simeon
- 1974: Silvano Simeon
- 1975: Armando De Vincentiis
- 1976: Armando De Vincentiis
- 1977: Silvano Simeon
- 1978: Armando De Vincentiis
- 1979: Silvano Simeon
- 1980: Armando De Vincentiis
- 1981: Armando De Vincentiis
- 1982: Marco Bucci
- 1983: Marco Martino
- 1984: Marco Bucci
- 1985: Domenico Polato
- 1986: Marco Martino
- 1987: Marco Martino
- 1988: Marco Martino
- 1989: Luciano Zerbini
- 1990: Marco Martino
- 1991: Marco Martino
- 1992: Luciano Zerbini
- 1993: Luciano Zerbini
- 1994: Diego Fortuna
- 1995: Diego Fortuna
- 1996: Alessandro Urlando
- 1997: Diego Fortuna
- 1998: Diego Fortuna
- 1999: Diego Fortuna
- 2000: Diego Fortuna
- 2001: Diego Fortuna
- 2002: Cristiano Andrei
- 2003: Cristiano Andrei
- 2004: Diego Fortuna
- 2005: Hannes Kirchler
- 2006: Hannes Kirchler
- 2007: Hannes Kirchler
- 2008: Hannes Kirchler
- 2009: Hannes Kirchler
- 2010: Hannes Kirchler
- 2011: Giovanni Faloci
- 2012: Eduardo Albertazzi
- 2013: Giovanni Faloci
- 2014: Hannes Kirchler
- 2015: Hannes Kirchler
- 2016: Hannes Kirchler
- 2017: Hannes Kirchler
- 2018: Giovanni Faloci
- 2019: Giovanni Faloci
- 2020: Giovanni Faloci
- 2021: Giovanni Faloci
- 2022: Alessio Mannucci
- 2023: Giovanni Faloci
- 2024: Alessio Mannucci

==== Javelin throw ====
Multiwinners
Athlete	Wins
Fabio De Gaspari	9
Amos Matteucci	8
Vanni Rodeghiero; Renzo Cramerotti	7
Carlo Lievore	6

- 1921: Carlo Clemente
- 1922: Carlo Clemente
- 1923: Carlo Clemente
- 1924: Carlo Clemente
- 1925: Giuseppe Palmieri
- 1926: Antonio Capecchi
- 1927: Antonio Capecchi
- 1928: Alberto Dominutti
- 1929: Giuseppe Palmieri
- 1930: Alberto Dominutti
- 1931: Alberto Dominutti
- 1932: Mario Agosti
- 1933: Luigi Spazzali
- 1934: Bruno Testa
- 1935: Mario Agosti
- 1936: Mario Agosti
- 1937: Bruno Testa
- 1938: Bruno Testa
- 1939: Raffaele Drei
- 1940: Bruno Rossi
- 1941: Bruno Rossi
- 1942: Amos Matteucci
- 1943: Raffaele Drei
- 1944: not held
- 1945: Amos Matteucci
- 1946: Amos Matteucci
- 1947: Bruno Rossi
- 1948: Amos Matteucci
- 1949: Amos Matteucci
- 1950: Amos Matteucci
- 1951: Amos Matteucci
- 1952: Amos Matteucci (8)
- 1953: Gianluigi Farina
- 1954: Francesco Ziggiotti
- 1955: Raffaele Bonaiuto
- 1956: Giovanni Lievore
- 1957: Carlo Lievore
- 1958: Giovanni Lievore
- 1959: Carlo Lievore
- 1960: Carlo Lievore
- 1961: Carlo Lievore
- 1962: Franco Radman
- 1963: Vanni Rodeghiero
- 1964: Carlo Lievore
- 1965: Vanni Rodeghiero
- 1966: Vanni Rodeghiero
- 1967: Franco Radman
- 1968: Vanni Rodeghiero
- 1969: Carlo Lievore (6)
- 1970: Renzo Cramerotti
- 1971: Renzo Cramerotti
- 1972: Renzo Cramerotti
- 1973: Renzo Cramerotti
- 1974: Vanni Rodeghiero
- 1975: Renzo Cramerotti
- 1976: Renzo Cramerotti
- 1977: Renzo Cramerotti (7)
- 1978: Vanni Rodeghiero
- 1979: Vincenzo Marchetti
- 1980: Vanni Rodeghiero (7)
- 1981: Agostino Ghesini
- 1982: Agostino Ghesini
- 1983: Agostino Ghesini
- 1984: Agostino Ghesini
- 1985: Fabio Michielon
- 1986: Agostino Ghesini
- 1987: Fabio De Gaspari
- 1988: Fabio De Gaspari
- 1989: Fabio De Gaspari
- 1990: Fabio De Gaspari
- 1991: Fabio De Gaspari
- 1992: Fabio De Gaspari
- 1993: Fabio De Gaspari
- 1994: Carlo Sonego
- 1995: Ivan Soffiato
- 1996: Fabio De Gaspari
- 1997: Fabio De Gaspari
- 1998: Armin Kerer
- 1999: Carlo Sonego
- 2000: Armin Kerer
- 2001: Alberto Desiderio
- 2002: Paolo Valt
- 2003: Francesco Pignata
- 2004: Francesco Pignata
- 2005: Francesco Pignata
- 2006: Francesco Pignata
- 2007: Daniele Crivellaro
- 2008: Roberto Bertolini
- 2009: Roberto Bertolini
- 2010: Roberto Bertolini
- 2011: Leonardo Gottardo
- 2012: Giacomo Puccini
- 2013: Norbert Bonvecchio
- 2014: Norbert Bonvecchio
- 2014: Roberto Bertolini
- 2016: Norbert Bonvecchio
- 2017: Mauro Fraresso
- 2018: Mauro Fraresso
- 2019: Mauro Fraresso (3)
- 2020: Norbert Bonvecchio (4)
- 2021: Roberto Orlando
- 2022: Roberto Orlando
- 2023: Roberto Orlando (3)
- 2024: Giovanni Frattini

==== Hammer throw ====
Multiwinners
Athlete	Wins
Teseo Taddia; Nicola Vizzoni	14
Giampaolo Urlando	10
Marco Lingua	8
Enrico Sgrulletti	7

- 1920: Giovanbattista Berardi
- 1921: Pietro Nava
- 1922: Pietro Nava
- 1923: Pietro Nava
- 1924: Camillo Zemi
- 1925: Camillo Zemi
- 1926: Armando Poggioli
- 1927: Armando Poggioli
- 1928: Armando Poggioli
- 1929: Armando Poggioli
- 1930: Armando Poggioli
- 1931: Fernando Vandelli
- 1932: Fernando Vandelli
- 1933: Fernando Vandelli
- 1934: Fernando Vandelli
- 1935: Giovanni Cantagalli
- 1936: Giovanni Cantagalli
- 1937: Giovanni Cantagalli
- 1938: Giovanni Cantagalli
- 1939: Teseo Taddia
- 1940: Vladimiro Superina
- 1941: Teseo Taddia
- 1942: Teseo Taddia
- 1943: Teseo Taddia
- 1944: not held
- 1945: Teseo Taddia
- 1946: Giuseppe Soldi
- 1947: Teseo Taddia
- 1948: Teseo Taddia
- 1949: Teseo Taddia
- 1950: Teseo Taddia
- 1951: Teseo Taddia
- 1952: Danilo Cereali
- 1953: Teseo Taddia
- 1954: Teseo Taddia
- 1955: Teseo Taddia
- 1956: Teseo Taddia
- 1957: Silvano Giovanetti
- 1958: Avio Lucioli
- 1959: Manlio Cristin
- 1960: Ennio Boschini
- 1961: Manlio Cristin
- 1962: Ennio Boschini
- 1963: Ennio Boschini
- 1964: Manlio Cristin
- 1965: Walter Bernardini
- 1966: Walter Bernardini
- 1967: Giampaolo Urlando
- 1968: Walter Bernardini
- 1969: Faustino De Boni
- 1970: Mario Vecchiato
- 1971: Mario Vecchiato
- 1972: Mario Vecchiato
- 1973: Orlando Barbolini
- 1974: Faustino De Boni
- 1975: Giampaolo Urlando
- 1976: Giampaolo Urlando
- 1977: Giampaolo Urlando
- 1978: Giampaolo Urlando
- 1979: Giampaolo Urlando
- 1980: Giampaolo Urlando
- 1981: Giampaolo Urlando
- 1982: Giampaolo Urlando
- 1983: Giampaolo Urlando
- 1984: Lucio Serrani
- 1985: Orlando Bianchini
- 1986: Lucio Serrani
- 1987: Lucio Serrani
- 1988: Lucio Serrani
- 1989: Enrico Sgrulletti
- 1990: Enrico Sgrulletti
- 1991: Lucio Serrani
- 1992: Enrico Sgrulletti
- 1993: Enrico Sgrulletti
- 1994: Enrico Sgrulletti
- 1995: Enrico Sgrulletti
- 1996: Enrico Sgrulletti
- 1997: Loris Paoluzzi
- 1998: Nicola Vizzoni
- 1999: Loris Paoluzzi
- 2000: Nicola Vizzoni
- 2001: Nicola Vizzoni
- 2002: Nicola Vizzoni
- 2003: Nicola Vizzoni
- 2004: Nicola Vizzoni
- 2005: Nicola Vizzoni
- 2006: Nicola Vizzoni
- 2007: Nicola Vizzoni
- 2008: Marco Lingua
- 2009: Nicola Vizzoni
- 2010: Nicola Vizzoni
- 2011: Nicola Vizzoni
- 2012: Lorenzo Povegliano
- 2013: Nicola Vizzoni
- 2014: Nicola Vizzoni
- 2015: Marco Bortolato
- 2016: Marco Lingua
- 2017: Marco Lingua
- 2018: Marco Lingua
- 2019: Marco Lingua
- 2020: Marco Lingua
- 2021: Marco Lingua
- 2022: Simone Falloni
- 2023: Simone Falloni
- 2024: Marco Lingua

=== Combined (Decathlon) ===
- 1960: Franco Sar
- 1961: Franco Sar
- 1962: Franco Sar
- 1963: Franco Sar
- 1964: Franco Sar
- 1965: Franco Sar
- 1966: Sergio Rossetti
- 1967: Bruno Poserina
- 1968: Sergio Rossetti
- 1969: Sergio Rossetti
- 1970: Sergio Rossetti
- 1971: Sergio Rossetti
- 1972: Giovanni Modena
- 1973: Daniele Faraggiana
- 1974: Mauro Bettela
- 1975: Giovanni Modena
- 1976: Daniele Faraggiana
- 1977: Giovanni Modena
- 1978: Hubert Indra
- 1979: Marco Nebiolo
- 1980: Hubert Indra
- 1981: Alessandro Brogini
- 1982: Antonio Iacocca
- 1983: Hubert Indra
- 1984: Moreno Martini
- 1985: Marco Rossi
- 1986: Marco Rossi
- 1987: Moreno Martini
- 1988: Marco Rossi
- 1989: Fabio Pacori
- 1990: Luciano Asta
- 1991: Marco Baffi
- 1992: Marco Baffi
- 1993: Ubaldo Ranzi
- 1994: Beniamino Poserina
- 1995: Beniamino Poserina
- 1996: Beniamino Poserina
- 1997: Beniamino Poserina
- 1998: Stefano Cellario
- 1999: Cristian Gasparro
- 2000: Beniamino Poserina
- 2001: William Frullani
- 2002: Paolo Casarsa
- 2003: Paolo Casarsa
- 2004: Paolo Mottadelli
- 2005: Paolo Mottadelli
- 2006: William Frullani
- 2007: Paolo Mottadelli
- 2008: Paolo Mottadelli
- 2009: Paolo Mottadelli
- 2010: William Frullani
- 2011: Paolo Mottadelli
- 2012: William Frullani
- 2013: Michele Calvi
- 2014: Michele Calvi
- 2015: Simone Cairoli
- 2016: Simone Cairoli
- 2017: Jacopo Zanatta
- 2018: Luca Di Tizio
- 2019: Matteo Taviani
- 2020: Dario Dester
- 2021: Lorenzo Modugno
- 2022: Dario Dester (2)
- 2023: Lorenzo Naidon
- 2024: Lorenzo Modugno (2)

== Women ==
=== Track ===
==== 100 metres ====
- 1927: Luigia Bonfanti
- 1928: Margherita Scolari
- 1929: not held
- 1930: Giovanna Viarengo
- 1931: Giovanna Viarengo (2)
- 1932: Claudia Testoni
- 1933: Ondina Valla
- 1934: Fernanda Bullano
- 1935: Fernanda Bullano (2)
- 1936: Ondina Valla (2)
- 1937: Claudia Testoni (2)
- 1938: Maria Alfero
- 1939: Italia Lucchini
- 1940: Claudia Testoni (3)
- 1941: Italia Lucchini (2)
- 1942: Italia Lucchini (3)
- 1943: Ines Bessanello
- 1944–1945: not held
- 1946: Mirella Avalle
- 1947: Mirella Avalle (2)
- 1948: Liliana Tagliaferri
- 1949: Liliana Tagliaferri (2)
- 1950: Laura Sivi
- 1951: Vittoria Cesarini
- 1952: Giuseppina Leone
- 1953: Giuseppina Leone (2)
- 1954: Giuseppina Leone (3)
- 1955: Giuseppina Leone (4)
- 1956: Giuseppina Leone (5)
- 1957: Giuseppina Leone (6)
- 1958: Giuseppina Leone (7)
- 1959: Giuseppina Leone (8)
- 1960: Giuseppina Leone (9)
- 1961: Donata Govoni
- 1962: Donata Govoni (2)
- 1963: Donata Govoni (3)
- 1964: Giovanna Carboncini
- 1965: Donata Govoni (4)
- 1966: Donata Govoni (5)
- 1967: Donata Govoni (6)
- 1968: Cecilia Molinari
- 1969: Donata Govoni (7)
- 1970: Cecilia Molinari (2)
- 1971: Cecilia Molinari (3)
- 1972: Cecilia Molinari (4)
- 1973: Cecilia Molinari (5)
- 1974: Cecilia Molinari (6)
- 1975: Rita Bottiglieri
- 1976: Rita Bottiglieri (2)
- 1977: Rita Bottiglieri (3)
- 1978: Laura Miano
- 1979: Laura Miano (2)
- 1980: Marisa Masullo
- 1981: Marisa Masullo (2)
- 1982: Marisa Masullo (3)
- 1983: Marisa Masullo (4)
- 1984: Marisa Masullo (5)
- 1985: Marisa Masullo (6)
- 1986: Rossella Tarolo
- 1987: Marisa Masullo (7)
- 1988: Marisa Masullo (8)
- 1989: Sonia Vigati
- 1990: Marisa Masullo (9)
- 1991: Marisa Masullo (10)
- 1992: Marisa Masullo (11)
- 1993: Giada Gallina
- 1994: Giada Gallina (2)
- 1995: Giada Gallina (3)
- 1996: Maria Ruggeri
- 1997: Giada Gallina (4)
- 1998: Elena Sordelli
- 1999: Manuela Levorato
- 2000: Francesca Cola
- 2001: Manuela Levorato (2)
- 2002: Manuela Levorato (3)
- 2003: Daniela Graglia
- 2004: Vincenza Calì
- 2005: Vincenza Calì (2)
- 2006: Elena Sordelli (2)
- 2007: Anita Pistone
- 2008: Anita Pistone (2)
- 2009: Anita Pistone (3)
- 2010: Manuela Levorato (4)
- 2011: Ilenia Draisci
- 2012: Audrey Alloh
- 2013: Gloria Hooper
- 2014: Irene Siragusa
- 2015: Gloria Hooper
- 2016: Gloria Hooper
- 2017: Irene Siragusa
- 2018: Johanelis Herrera
- 2019: Zaynab Dosso
- 2020: Zaynab Dosso (2)
- 2021: Anna Bongiorni
- 2022: Zaynab Dosso (3)
- 2023: Zaynab Dosso (4)
- 2024: Zaynab Dosso (5)

==== 200 metres ====
- 1930: Maria Bravin
- 1931: Nives De Grassi
- 1932: Maria Coselli
- 1933: Claudia Testoni
- 1934: Claudia Testoni (2)
- 1935: Livia Michiels
- 1936: Gina Varetto
- 1937: Fernanda Bullano
- 1938: Ita Penzo
- 1939: Rosetta Cattaneo
- 1940: Rosetta Cattaneo (2)
- 1941: Ester Meneghello
- 1942: Rosetta Cattaneo (3)
- 1943: Rosetta Cattaneo (4)
- 1944–1945: not held
- 1946: Anna Maria Cantù
- 1947: Anna Maria Cantù (2)
- 1948: Mirella Avalle
- 1949: Marisa Rossi
- 1950: Laura Sivi
- 1951: Vittoria Cesarini
- 1952: Giuseppina Leone
- 1953: Giuseppina Leone (2)
- 1954: Giuseppina Leone (3)
- 1955: Giuseppina Leone (4)
- 1956: Giuseppina Leone (5)
- 1957: Giuseppina Leone (6)
- 1958: Giuseppina Leone (7)
- 1959: Giuseppina Leone (8)
- 1960: Giuseppina Leone (9)
- 1961: Donata Govoni
- 1962: Letizia Bertoni
- 1963: Donata Govoni (2)
- 1964: Giovanna Carboncini
- 1965: Donata Govoni (3)
- 1966: Donata Govoni (4)
- 1967: Donata Govoni (5)
- 1968: Michela Poggipollini
- 1969: Maria Bruni
- 1970: Maria Bruni (2)
- 1971: Maddalena Grassano
- 1972: Laura Nappi
- 1973: Laura Nappi (2)
- 1974: Laura Nappi (3)
- 1975: Rita Bottiglieri
- 1976: Rita Bottiglieri (2)
- 1977: Rita Bottiglieri (3)
- 1978: Marisa Masullo
- 1979: Patrizia Lombardo
- 1980: Marisa Masullo (2)
- 1981: Marisa Masullo (3)
- 1982: Marisa Masullo (4)
- 1983: Marisa Masullo (5)
- 1984: Carla Mercurio
- 1985: Marisa Masullo (6)
- 1986: Daniela Ferrian
- 1987: Marisa Masullo (7)
- 1988: Marisa Masullo (8)
- 1989: Rossella Tarolo
- 1990: Marisa Masullo (9)
- 1991: Rossella Tarolo (2)
- 1992: Marisa Masullo (10)
- 1993: Giada Gallina
- 1994: Giada Gallina (2)
- 1995: Giada Gallina (3)
- 1996: Virna De Angeli
- 1997: Virna De Angeli (2)
- 1998: Elena Apollonio
- 1999: Danielle Perpoli
- 2000: Danielle Perpoli
- 2001: Manuela Levorato
- 2002: Daniela Graglia
- 2003: Daniela Graglia (2)
- 2004: Vincenza Calì
- 2005: Vincenza Calì (2)
- 2006: Daniela Graglia (3)
- 2007: Anita Pistone
- 2008: Vincenza Calì (3)
- 2009: Giulia Arcioni
- 2010: Giulia Arcioni (2)
- 2011: Marzia Caravelli
- 2012: Libania Grenot
- 2013: Marzia Caravelli
- 2014: Irene Siragusa
- 2015: Gloria Hooper
- 2016: Gloria Hooper
- 2017: Gloria Hooper
- 2018: Irene Siragusa
- 2019: Gloria Hooper
- 2020: Dalia Kaddari
- 2021: Dalia Kaddari
- 2022: Dalia Kaddari
- 2023: Dalia Kaddari
- 2024: Anna Bongiorni

==== 400 metres ====
- 1925: Bruna Pizzini
- 1927: Bruna Pizzini (2)
- 1927: not held
- 1928: Giannina Marchini
- 1929: Maria Bravini
- 1930–1956: not held
- 1957: Delma Savorelli
- 1958: Delma Savorelli (2)
- 1959: Danila Costa
- 1960: Danila Costa (2)
- 1961: Maria La Barbera
- 1962: Delma Savorelli (3)
- 1963: Armida Guzzetti
- 1964: Luisa Cesari
- 1965: Paola Pigni
- 1966: Donata Govoni
- 1967: Paola Pigni (2)
- 1968: Donata Govoni (2)
- 1969: Donata Govoni (3)
- 1970: Armida Giumanini
- 1971: Donata Govoni (4)
- 1972: Silvana Zangirolami
- 1973: Donata Govoni (5)
- 1974: Donata Govoni (6)
- 1975: Donata Govoni (7)
- 1976: Erica Rossi
- 1977: Erica Rossi (2)
- 1978: Erica Rossi (3)
- 1979: Erica Rossi (4)
- 1980: Erica Rossi (5)
- 1981: Erica Rossi (6)
- 1982: Erica Rossi (7)
- 1983: Erica Rossi (8)
- 1984: Erica Rossi (9)
- 1985: Erica Rossi (10)
- 1986: Cosetta Campana
- 1987: Erica Rossi (11)
- 1988: Rossana Morabito
- 1989: Rossana Morabito (2)
- 1990: Irmgard Trojer
- 1991: Roberta Rabaioli
- 1992: Cosetta Campana (2)
- 1993: Francesca Carbone
- 1994: Patrizia Spuri
- 1995: Danielle Perpoli
- 1996: Patrizia Spuri (2)
- 1997: Patrizia Spuri (3)
- 1998: Patrizia Spuri (4)
- 1999: Virna De Angeli
- 2000: Daniela Graglia
- 2001: Daniela Graglia (2)
- 2002: Danielle Perpoli (2)
- 2003: Virna De Angeli (2)
- 2004: Virna De Angeli (3)
- 2005: Daniela Reina
- 2006: Daniela Reina (2)
- 2007: Daniela Reina (3)
- 2008: Daniela Reina (4)
- 2009: Libania Grenot
- 2010: Libania Grenot (2)
- 2011: Marta Milani
- 2012: Maria Enrica Spacca
- 2013: Chiara Bazzoni
- 2014: Libania Grenot
- 2015: Libania Grenot
- 2016: Libania Grenot
- 2017: Benedicta Chigbolu
- 2018: Raphaela Lukudo
- 2019: Giancarla Trevisan
- 2020: Alice Mangione
- 2021: Alice Mangione
- 2022: Alice Mangione
- 2023: Alessandra Bonora
- 2024: Alice Mangione

==== 800 metres ====
Multiwinners
Athlete	Wins
Leandrina Bulzacchi; Gabriella Dorio; Nicoletta Tozzi	7
Loredana Simonetti; Gilda Jannaccone; Paola Pigni	6
Claudia Salvarani; Elisa Cusma	5

- 1924: Amelia Schenone
- 1925: not held
- 1926: Emilia Pedrazzini
- 1927: Emilia Pedrazzini (2)
- 1928–1929: not held
- 1930: Leandrina Bulzacchi
- 1931: Leandrina Bulzacchi (2)
- 1932–1933: not held
- 1934: Leandrina Bulzacchi (3)
- 1935: Leandrina Bulzacchi (4)
- 1936: Leandrina Bulzacchi (5)
- 1937: Leandrina Bulzacchi (6)
- 1938: Leandrina Bulzacchi (7)
- 1939: Cleo Balbo
- 1940: Livia Galimberti
- 1941: Livia Galimberti (2)
- 1942: Nilla Tonani
- 1943: Brunilde Leone
- 1944–1945: not held
- 1946: Eralda Zucchetti
- 1947: Nilla Tonani (2)
- 1948: Nilla Tonani (3)
- 1949: Loredana Simonetti
- 1950: Loredana Simonetti (2)
- 1951: Loredana Simonetti (3)
- 1952: Loredana Simonetti (4)
- 1953: Loredana Simonetti (5)
- 1954: Loredana Simonetti (6)
- 1955: Maria Albano
- 1956: Vita Virgilio
- 1957: Vita Virgilio (2)
- 1958: Gilda Jannaccone
- 1959: Gilda Jannaccone (2)
- 1960: Gilda Jannaccone (3)
- 1961: Gilda Jannaccone (4)
- 1962: Gilda Jannaccone (5)
- 1963: Gilda Jannaccone (6)
- 1964: Silvana Acquarone
- 1965: Paola Pigni
- 1966: Paola Pigni (2)
- 1967: Paola Pigni (3)
- 1968: Paola Pigni (4)
- 1969: Paola Pigni (5)
- 1970: Donata Govoni
- 1971: Angela Ramello
- 1972: Donata Govoni (2)
- 1973: Paola Pigni (6)
- 1974: Gabriella Dorio
- 1975: Gabriella Dorio (2)
- 1976: Gabriella Dorio (3)
- 1977: Alma Pescalli
- 1978: Agnese Possamai
- 1979: Agnese Possamai (2)
- 1980: Gabriella Dorio (4)
- 1981: Gabriella Dorio (5)
- 1982: Gabriella Dorio (6)
- 1983: Gabriella Dorio (7)
- 1984: Nicoletta Tozzi
- 1985: Erica Rossi
- 1986: Nicoletta Tozzi (2)
- 1987: Nicoletta Tozzi (3)
- 1988: Nicoletta Tozzi (4)
- 1989: Nicoletta Tozzi (5)
- 1990: Nicoletta Tozzi (6)
- 1991: Fabia Trabaldo
- 1992: Nadia Falvo
- 1993: Nicoletta Tozzi (7)
- 1994: Serenella Sbrissa
- 1995: Eleonora Berlanda
- 1996: Serenella Sbrissa (2)
- 1997: Claudia Salvarani
- 1998: Claudia Salvarani (2)
- 1999: Patrizia Spuri
- 2000: Claudia Salvarani (3)
- 2001: Elisabetta Artuso
- 2002: Claudia Salvarani (4)
- 2003: Claudia Salvarani (5)
- 2004: Elisabetta Artuso (2)
- 2005: Elisa Cusma
- 2006: Elisa Cusma (2)
- 2007: Elisa Cusma (3)
- 2008: Elisa Cusma (4)
- 2009: Elisa Cusma (5)
- 2010: Antonella Riva
- 2011: Elisabetta Artuso (3)
- 2012: Marta Milani
- 2013: Marta Milani (2)
- 2014: Marta Milani (3)
- 2015: Marta Zenoni
- 2016: Yusneysi Santiusti
- 2017: Yusneysi Santiusti (2)
- 2018: Irene Baldessari
- 2019: Eloisa Coiro
- 2020: Elena Bellò
- 2021: Elena Bellò (2)
- 2022: Eloisa Coiro (2)
- 2023: Eloisa Coiro (3)
- 2024: Eloisa Coiro (4)

==== 1500 metres ====
- 1969: Angela Ramello
- 1970: Paola Pigni
- 1971: Zina Boniolo
- 1972: Paola Pigni (2)
- 1973: Gabriella Dorio
- 1974: Paola Pigni (3)
- 1975: Paola Pigni (4)
- 1976: Gabriella Dorio
- 1977: Gabriella Dorio (2)
- 1978: Gabriella Dorio (3)
- 1979: Gabriella Dorio (4)
- 1980: Gabriella Dorio (5)
- 1981: Gabriella Dorio (6)
- 1982: Gabriella Dorio (7)
- 1983: Gabriella Dorio (8)
- 1984: Gabriella Dorio (9)
- 1985: Roberta Brunet
- 1986: Roberta Brunet (2)
- 1987: Betty Molteni
- 1988: Roberta Brunet (3)
- 1989: Roberta Brunet (4)
- 1990: Roberta Brunet (5)
- 1991: Fabia Trabaldo
- 1992: Fabia Trabaldo (2)
- 1993: Fabia Trabaldo (3)
- 1994: Serenella Sbrissa
- 1995: Patrizia Cassard
- 1996: Serenella Sbrissa (2)
- 1997: Serenella Sbrissa (3)
- 1998: Serenella Sbrissa (4)
- 1999: Ilaria Di Santo
- 2000: Silvia Basso
- 2001: Sara Palmas
- 2002: Sara Palmas (2)
- 2003: Sara Palmas (3)
- 2004: Eleonora Berlanda
- 2005: Eleonora Berlanda (2)
- 2006: Eleonora Berlanda (3)
- 2007: Silvia Weissteiner
- 2008: Maria Vittoria Fontanesi
- 2009: Elena Romagnolo
- 2010: Elisa Cusma
- 2011: Elisa Cusma (2)
- 2012: Elisa Cusma (3)
- 2013: Giulia Viola
- 2014: Federica Del Buono
- 2015: Margherita Magnani
- 2016: Margherita Magnani (2)
- 2017: Giulia Aprile
- 2018: Giulia Aprile (2)
- 2019: Marta Zenoni
- 2020: Eleonora Vandi
- 2021: Nadia Battocletti
- 2022: Ludovica Cavalli
- 2023: Sintayehu Vissa
- 2024: Federica Del Buono (2)

==== 3000/5000 metres ====
From 1974 to 1994 were held 3000 metres, from 1995 5000 metres.

- 1972: Bruna Lovisolo
- 1973: Margherita Gargano
- 1974: Paola Pigni
- 1975: Silvana Cruciata
- 1976: Margherita Gargano
- 1977: Cristina Tomasini
- 1978: Silvana Cruciata
- 1979: Margherita Gargano
- 1980: Margherita Gargano
- 1981: Silvana Cruciata
- 1982: Agnese Possamai
- 1983: Agnese Possamai
- 1984: Agnese Possamai
- 1985: Agnese Possamai
- 1986: Roberta Brunet
- 1987: Agnese Possamai
- 1988: Roberta Brunet
- 1989: Roberta Brunet
- 1990: Roberta Brunet
- 1991: Nadia Dandolo
- 1992: Roberta Brunet
- 1993: Valentina Tauceri
- 1994: Roberta Brunet
- 1995: Silvia Sommaggio
- 1996: Roberta Brunet
- 1997: Lucilla Andreucci
- 1998: Elisa Rea
- 1999: Elisa Rea
- 2000: Roberta Brunet
- 2001: Elisa Rea
- 2002: Gloria Marconi
- 2003: Agata Balsamo
- 2004: Gloria Marconi
- 2005: Silvia Weissteiner
- 2006: Silvia Weissteiner
- 2007: Claudia Pinna
- 2008: Elena Romagnolo
- 2009: Federica Dal Ri
- 2010: Federica Dal Ri
- 2011: Silvia Weissteiner
- 2012: Silvia Weissteiner
- 2013: Giulia Viola
- 2014: Giulia Viola
- 2015: Silvia Weissteiner
- 2016: Veronica Inglese
- 2017: Valeria Roffino
- 2018: Nadia Battocletti
- 2019: Marta Zenoni
- 2020: Nadia Battocletti
- 2021: Anna Arnaudo
- 2022: Micol Majori
- 2023: Nadia Battocletti
- 2024: Nadia Battocletti

==== 10000 metres ====
- 1984: Rita Marchisio
- 1985: Maria Curatolo (2)
- 1986: Cristina Tomasini
- 1987: Maria Curatolo (3)
- 1988: Maria Curatolo (4)
- 1989: Maria Curatolo (5)
- 1990: Orietta Mancia
- 1991: Maria Guida
- 1992: Orietta Mancia (2)
- 1993: Maria Guida (2)
- 1994: Maria Guida (3)
- 1995: Maria Guida (4)
- 1996: Maria Guida (5)
- 1997: Silvia Sommaggio
- 1998: Lucilla Andreucci
- 1999: Agata Balsamo
- 2000: Silvia Sommaggio (2)
- 2001: Maria Guida (6)
- 2002: Maura Viceconte
- 2003: Gloria Marconi
- 2004: Vincenza Sicari
- 2005: Renate Rungger
- 2006: Gloria Marconi (2)
- 2007: Gloria Marconi (3)
- 2008: Rosaria Console
- 2009: Anna Incerti
- 2010: Claudia Finielli
- 2011: Nadia Ejjafini
- 2012: Federica Dal Ri

Stand alone championship

- 2013: Valeria Straneo
- 2014: Veronica Inglese
- 2015: Claudia Pinna
- 2016: Rosaria Console
- 2017: Sara Dossena
- 2018: Rosaria Console (2)
- 2019: Isabel Mattuzzi
- 2020: Valeria Straneo (2)
- 2021: Martina Merlo
- 2022: Anna Arnaudo
- 2023: Nadia Battocletti
- 2024: Anna Arnaudo (2)
- 2025: Sara Nestola
- 2026: Federica Del Buono

==== 80/100 m hurdles ====
80 metres hurdles

- 1960: Letizia Bertoni
- 1961: Letizia Bertoni
- 1962: Letizia Bertoni
- 1963: Letizia Bertoni
- 1964: Letizia Bertoni
- 1965: Magaly Vettorazzo
- 1966: Magaly Vettorazzo
- 1967: Magaly Vettorazzo
- 1968: Carla Panerai

100 metres hurdles

- 1969: Magalì Vettorazzo
- 1970: Antonella Battaglia
- 1971: Antonella Battaglia
- 1972: Ileana Ongar
- 1973: Ileana Ongar
- 1974: Ileana Ongar
- 1975: Ileana Ongar
- 1976: Ileana Ongar
- 1977: Ileana Ongar
- 1978: Ileana Ongar
- 1979: Patrizia Lombardo
- 1980: Antonella Battaglia
- 1981: Patrizia Lombardo
- 1982: Laura Rosati
- 1983: Simona Parmiggiani
- 1984: Laura Rosati
- 1985: Patrizia Lombardo
- 1986: Mary Massarin
- 1987: Carla Tuzzi
- 1988: Carla Tuzzi
- 1989: Carla Tuzzi
- 1990: Carla Tuzzi
- 1991: Daniela Morandini
- 1992: Daniela Morandini
- 1993: Carla Tuzzi
- 1994: Carla Tuzzi
- 1995: Carla Tuzzi
- 1996: Carla Tuzzi
- 1997: Carla Tuzzi
- 1998: Anna Maria Di Terlizzi
- 1999: Margaret Macchiut
- 2000: Margaret Macchiut
- 2001: Margaret Macchiut
- 2002: Margaret Macchiut
- 2003: Margaret Macchiut
- 2004: Margaret Macchiut
- 2005: Micol Cattaneo
- 2006: Margaret Macchiut
- 2007: Micol Cattaneo
- 2008: Micol Cattaneo
- 2009: Micol Cattaneo
- 2010: Marzia Caravelli
- 2011: Marzia Caravelli
- 2012: Marzia Caravelli
- 2013: Marzia Caravelli
- 2014: Marzia Caravelli
- 2015: Giulia Tessaro
- 2016: Giulia Pennella
- 2017: Micol Cattaneo
- 2018: Luminosa Bogliolo
- 2019: Luminosa Bogliolo
- 2020: Luminosa Bogliolo
- 2021: Luminosa Bogliolo
- 2022: Elisa Di Lazzaro

==== 400 m hurdles ====
- 1977: Giuseppina Cirulli
- 1978: Giuseppina Cirulli
- 1979: Giuseppina Cirulli
- 1980: Giuseppina Cirulli
- 1981: Giuseppina Cirulli
- 1982: Giuseppina Cirulli
- 1983: Giuseppina Cirulli
- 1984: Giuseppina Cirulli
- 1985: Giuseppina Cirulli
- 1986: Giuseppina Cirulli
- 1987: Irmgard Trojer
- 1988: Irmgard Trojer
- 1989: Irmgard Trojer
- 1990: Irmgard Trojer
- 1991: Irmgard Trojer
- 1992: Irmgard Trojer
- 1993: Elena Zamperioli
- 1994: Virna De Angeli
- 1995: Virna De Angeli
- 1996: Carla Barbarino
- 1997: Carla Barbarino
- 1998: Monika Niederstätter
- 1999: Monika Niederstätter
- 2000: Monika Niederstätter
- 2001: Monika Niederstätter
- 2002: Monika Niederstätter
- 2003: Monika Niederstätter
- 2004: Benedetta Ceccarelli
- 2005: Benedetta Ceccarelli
- 2006: Benedetta Ceccarelli
- 2007: Benedetta Ceccarelli
- 2008: Benedetta Ceccarelli
- 2009: Benedetta Ceccarelli
- 2010: Manuela Gentili
- 2011: Manuela Gentili
- 2012: Manuela Gentili
- 2013: Yadisleidy Pedroso
- 2014: Yadisleidy Pedroso
- 2015: Yadisleidy Pedroso
- 2016: Ayomide Folorunso
- 2017: Yadisleidy Pedroso
- 2018: Yadisleidy Pedroso
- 2019: Ayomide Folorunso
- 2020: Ayomide Folorunso
- 2021: Eleonora Marchiando
- 2022: Ayomide Folorunso

==== 3000 m steeplechase ====
- 2001: Pierangela Baronchelli
- 2002: Emma Quaglia
- 2003: Marzena Michalska
- 2004: Marzena Michalska
- 2005: Elena Romagnolo
- 2006: Elena Romagnolo
- 2007: Elena Romagnolo
- 2008: Emma Quaglia
- 2009: Emma Quaglia
- 2010: Valentina Costanza
- 2011: Valentina Costanza
- 2012: Valentina Costanza
- 2013: Nicole Reina
- 2014: Valeria Roffino
- 2015: Valeria Roffino
- 2016: Francesca Bertoni
- 2017: Francesca Bertoni
- 2018: Isabel Mattuzzi
- 2019: Isabel Mattuzzi
- 2020: Martina Merlo
- 2021: Martina Merlo
- 2022: Martina Merlo

=== Road ===
==== 10 km road ====
- 2010: Agnes Tschurtschenthaler
- 2011: Valeria Straneo
- 2012: Valeria Straneo
- 2013: Veronica Inglese
- 2014: Laila Soufyane
- 2015: Anna Incerti
- 2016: Fatna Maraoui
- 2017: Fatna Maraoui
- 2018: Sara Dossena
- 2019: Fatna Maraoui
- 2021: not disputed
- 2021: Sofiia Yaremchuk
- 2022: Sofiia Yaremchuk
- 2023: Nadia Battocletti

==== Half marathon ====
- 1980: Laura Fogli
- 1981: Alba Milana
- 1982: Laura Fogli (2)
- 1983: Rita Marchisio
- 1984: Rita Marchisio (2)
- 1985: Anna Villani
- 1986: Maria Curatolo
- 1987: Cristina Tomasini
- 1988: Maria Curatolo (2)
- 1989: Allison Rabour
- 1990: Silvana Cuchietti
- 1991: Anna Villani (2)
- 1992: Anna Villani (3)
- 1993: Anna Villani (4)
- 1994: Maria Guida
- 1995: Maria Curatolo (3)
- 1996: Lucilla Andreucci
- 1997: Lucilla Andreucci (2)
- 1998: Lucilla Andreucci (3)
- 1999: Maria Guida (2)
- 2000: Maura Viceconte
- 2001: Maura Viceconte (2)
- 2002: Maria Guida (3)
- 2003: Rosaria Console
- 2004: Patrizia Tisi
- 2005: Bruna Genovese
- 2006: Gloria Marconi
- 2007: Anna Incerti
- 2008: Anna Incerti (2)
- 2009: Rosaria Console (2)
- 2010: Rosaria Console (3)
- 2011: Nadia Ejjafini
- 2012: Valeria Straneo
- 2013: Claudia Pinna
- 2014: Valeria Straneo (2)
- 2015: Laila Soufyane
- 2016: Rosaria Console (4)
- 2017: Sara Brogiato
- 2018: Valeria Straneo (3)
- 2019: Anna Incerti (3)
- 2020: Valeria Straneo (4)
- 2021: Giovanna Epis
- 2022: Sofiia Yaremchuk

==== Marathon ====
- 1980: Maria Pia D'Orlando
- 1981: Silvana Cruciata
- 1982: Alba Milana
- 1983: Alba Milana (2)
- 1984: Paola Moro
- 1985: Paola Moro (2)
- 1986: Paola Moro (3)
- 1987: Rita Marchisio
- 1988: Graziella Struli
- 1989: Emma Scaunich
- 1990: Emma Scaunich (2)
- 1991: Emma Scaunich (3)
- 1992: Emma Scaunich (4)
- 1993: Emma Scaunich (5)
- 1994: Maura Viceconte
- 1995: Maura Viceconte (2)
- 1996: Franca Fiacconi
- 1997: Ornella Ferrara
- 1998: Franca Fiacconi (2)
- 1999: Sonia Maccioni
- 2000: Patrizia Ritondo
- 2001: Patrizia Ritondo (2)
- 2002: Tiziana Alagia
- 2003: Anna Incerti
- 2004: Ornella Ferrara (2)
- 2005: Ivana Iozzia
- 2006: Marcella Mancini
- 2007: Ivana Iozzia (2)
- 2008: Rosaria Console
- 2009: Laura Giordano
- 2010: Marcella Mancini (2)
- 2011: Martina Celi
- 2012: Ivana Iozzia (3)
- 2013: Elisa Stefani
- 2104: Claudia Gelsomino
- 2015: Catherine Bertone
- 2016: Martina Facciani
- 2017: Federica Dal Ri
- 2018: Eleonora Gardelli
- 2019: Martina Facciani
- 2020: Giovanna Epis
- 2021: Arianna Lutteri

==== 5000 m walk ====
The 5000 m walk race, generally held on the track, was established at the Italian championships in 1981 and ran until 2010.

- 1981: Paola Pastorini
- 1982: Giuliana Salce
- 1983: Giuliana Salce
- 1984: Giuliana Salce
- 1985: Maria Grazia Cogoli
- 1986: Maria Grazia Cogoli
- 1987: Giuliana Salce
- 1988: Pier Carola Pagani
- 1989: Ileana Salvador
- 1990: Ileana Salvador
- 1991: Ileana Salvador
- 1992: Ileana Salvador
- 1993: Ileana Salvador
- 1994: Elisabetta Perrone
- 1995: Annarita Sidoti
- 1996: Elisabetta Perrone
- 1997: Elisabetta Perrone
- 1998: Erica Alfridi
- 1999: Cristiana Pellino
- 2000: Cristiana Pellino
- 2001: Cristiana Pellino
- 2002: Erica Alfridi
- 2003: Elisabetta Perrone
- 2004: Elisa Rigaudo
- 2005: Sibilla Di Vincenzo
- 2006: Rossella Giordano
- 2007: Elisa Rigaudo
- 2008: Sibilla Di Vincenzo
- 2009: Sibilla Di Vincenzo
- 2010: Sibilla Di Vincenzo

==== 10 km walk (10,000 m walk) ====
In same editions the race was disputed on 10,000 m track.

- 1984: Giuliana Salce
- 1985: Maria Grazia Cogoli
- 1986: Nadia Forestan
- 1987: Ileana Salvador
- 1988: Erica Alfridi
- 1989: Ileana Salvador
- 1990: Ileana Salvador
- 1991: Annarita Sidoti
- 1992: Ileana Salvador
- 1993: Ileana Salvador
- 1994: Elisabetta Perrone
- 1995: Elisabetta Perrone
- 1996: Rossella Giordano
- 1997: Erica Alfridi
- 1998: Rossella Giordano
- 1999/2010: not held
- 2011: Federica Ferraro (10,000 m track)
- 2012: Eleonora Giorgi
- 2013: Elisa Rigaudo (10,000 m track)
- 2014: Antonella Palmisano
- 2015: Elisa Rigaudo
- 2016: Valentina Trapletti
- 2017: Eleonora Giorgi (10,000 m track)
- 2018: Antonella Palmisano
- 2019: Eleonora Giorgi (10,000 m track)
- 2020: Antonella Palmisano
- 2021: Nicole Colombi
- 2022: Valentina Trapletti

==== 20 km and half marathon walk ====
===== 20 km walk =====
It was replaced by the half marathon in 2026.

- 1992: Annarita Sidoti
- 1993: Ileana Salvador
- 1994: not held
- 1995: Annarita Sidoti
- 1996: Erica Alfridi
- 1997: Erica Alfridi
- 1998: Santa Compagnoni
- 1999: Erica Alfridi
- 2000: Annarita Sidoti
- 2001: Elisabetta Perrone
- 2002: Annarita Sidoti
- 2003: Elisa Rigaudo
- 2004: Elisa Rigaudo
- 2005: Elisa Rigaudo
- 2006: Gisella Orsini
- 2007: Gisella Orsini
- 2008: Elisa Rigaudo
- 2009: Valentina Trapletti
- 2010: Sibilla Di Vincenzo
- 2011: Federica Ferraro
- 2012: Federica Ferraro
- 2013: Federica Ferraro
- 2014: Antonella Palmisano
- 2015: Valentina Trapletti
- 2016: Sibilla Di Vincenzo
- 2017: Valentina Trapletti
- 2018: Valentina Trapletti
- 2019: Eleonora Dominici
- 2020: not disputed due Covid
- 2021: Eleonora Giorgi
- 2022: Valentina Trapletti
- 2023: Valentina Trapletti
- 2024: Nicole Colombi
- 2025: Alexandrina Mihai

===== Half marathon race walk =====
- 2026: Sofia Fiorini

==== 50 km, 35 km and marathon walk ====
===== 50 km walk =====
Introduced in 2018, it was replaced by the 35 km in 2021.

- 2018: Beatrice Foresti
- 2019: Nicole Colombi
- 2020: not disputed due Covid

===== 35 km walk =====
Introduced in 2021, it was replaced by the marathon in 2026.

- 2021: Eleonora Giorgi
- 2022: Federica Curiazzi
- 2023: Sara Vitiello
- 2024: Sara Vitiello
- 2025: Federica Curiazzi

===== Marathon race walk =====
- 2026: Sofia Fiorini

=== Field ===
==== Long jump ====
Multiwinners
Athlete	Wins
Tania Vicenzino	9
Antonella Capriotti	8
Claudia Testoni; Magaly Vettorazzo	7

- 1923: Maria Piantanida
- 1924: Maria Piantanida
- 1925: Andreina Sacco
- 1926: Luigia Bonfanti
- 1927: Vittorina Vivenza
- 1928: Derna Polazzo
- 1929: not held
- 1930: Giovanna Viarengo
- 1931: Claudia Testoni
- 1932: Claudia Testoni
- 1933: Claudia Testoni
- 1934: Claudia Testoni
- 1935: Claudia Testoni
- 1936: Jolanda Colombo
- 1937: Claudia Testoni
- 1938: Claudia Testoni
- 1939: Amelia Piccinini
- 1940: Amelia Piccinini
- 1941: Lidia Zanuttigh
- 1942: Elda Franco
- 1943: Amelia Piccinini
- 1944: not held
- 1945: Amelia Piccinini
- 1946: Amelia Piccinini
- 1947: Lidia Zanuttigh
- 1948: Silvana Pierucci
- 1949: Silvana Pierucci
- 1950: Silvana Pierucci
- 1951: Silvana Pierucci
- 1952: Maria Gabriella Pinto
- 1953: Maria Gabriella Pinto
- 1954: Maria Musso
- 1955: Piera Fassio
- 1956: Piera Fassio
- 1957: Piera Fassio
- 1958: Piera Fassio
- 1959: Piera Tizzoni
- 1960: Piera Tizzoni
- 1961: Magaly Vettorazzo
- 1962: Magaly Vettorazzo
- 1963: Magaly Vettorazzo
- 1964: Magaly Vettorazzo
- 1965: Maria Vittoria Trio
- 1966: Magaly Vettorazzo
- 1967: Magaly Vettorazzo
- 1968: Maria Vittoria Trio
- 1969: Magaly Vettorazzo
- 1970: Mariella Baucia
- 1971: Barbara Ridi
- 1972: Barbara Ridi
- 1973: Manuela Martinelli
- 1974: Ambra Colombo
- 1975: Laura Santini
- 1976: Laura Nappi
- 1977: Graziella Clemente
- 1978: Emanuela Nini
- 1979: Barbara Norello
- 1980: Giusy Albanese
- 1981: Elena Cafaro
- 1982: Alessandra Oldani
- 1983: Alessandra Becatti
- 1984: Antonella Capriotti
- 1985: Antonella Capriotti
- 1986: Antonella Capriotti
- 1987: Antonella Capriotti
- 1988: Antonella Capriotti
- 1989: Antonella Capriotti
- 1990: Antonella Capriotti
- 1991: Valentina Uccheddu
- 1992: Valentina Uccheddu
- 1993: Antonella Capriotti
- 1994: Fiona May
- 1995: Valentina Uccheddu
- 1996: Fiona May
- 1997: Arianna Zivez
- 1998: Maria Chiara Baccini
- 1999: Valentina Uccheddu
- 2000: Laura Gatto
- 2001: Laura Gatto
- 2002: Laura Gatto
- 2003: Thaimi O’Reilly
- 2004: Laura Gatto
- 2005: Fiona May
- 2006: Valeria Canella
- 2007: Tania Vicenzino
- 2008: Tania Vicenzino
- 2009: Tania Vicenzino
- 2010: Tania Vicenzino
- 2011: Tania Vicenzino
- 2012: Tania Vicenzino
- 2013: Tania Vicenzino
- 2014: Tania Vicenzino
- 2015: Martina Lorenzetto
- 2016: Laura Strati
- 2017: Laura Strati
- 2018: Laura Strati
- 2019: Tania Vicenzino
- 2020: Larissa Iapichino
- 2021: Larissa Iapichino
- 2022: Larissa Iapichino

==== Triple jump ====
- 1990: Anna Maria Bonazza
- 1991: Antonella Capriotti
- 1992: Antonella Capriotti
- 1993: Antonella Capriotti
- 1994: Barbara Lah
- 1995: Barbara Lah
- 1996: Barbara Lah
- 1997: Antonella Capriotti
- 1998: Maria Costanza Moroni
- 1999: Barbara Lah
- 2000: Silvia Biondini
- 2001: Silvia Biondini
- 2002: Magdelín Martínez
- 2003: Barbara Lah
- 2004: Simona La Mantia
- 2005: Simona La Mantia
- 2006: Simona La Mantia
- 2007: Magdelín Martínez
- 2008: Magdelín Martínez
- 2009: Magdelín Martínez
- 2010: Simona La Mantia
- 2011: Simona La Mantia
- 2012: Simona La Mantia
- 2013: Simona La Mantia
- 2014: Dariya Derkach
- 2015: Ottavia Cestonaro
- 2016: Dariya Derkach
- 2017: Dariya Derkach
- 2018: Ottavia Cestonaro
- 2019: Ottavia Cestonaro
- 2020: Dariya Derkach
- 2021: Dariya Derkach
- 2022: Dariya Derkach

==== High jump ====
- 1923: Lina Banzi
- 1924: Andreina Sacco
- 1925: Andreina Sacco (2)
- 1926: Lina Banzi (2)
- 1927: Silia Martini
- 1928: Silia Martini (2)
- 1929: Silia Martini (3)
- 1930: Ondina Valla
- 1931: Ondina Valla (2)
- 1932: Maria Cosselli
- 1933: Ondina Valla (3)
- 1934: Elsa Lambertini
- 1935: Maria Pia Montarino
- 1936: Tina Migliasso
- 1937: Ondina Valla (4)
- 1938: Modesta Puhar
- 1939: Elda Franco
- 1940: Ondina Valla (5)
- 1941: Sara Aldovandri
- 1942: Gianna Jannoni
- 1943: Caterina Gallo
- 1944–1945: not disputed
- 1946: Ester Palmesino
- 1947: Gianna Jannoni (2)
- 1948: Ester Palmesino (2)
- 1949: Gianna Jannoni (3)
- 1950: Gianna Jannoni (4)
- 1951: Gianna Jannoni (5)
- 1952: Ester Palmesino (2)
- 1953: Ester Palmesino (3)
- 1954: Osvalda Giardi
- 1955: Paola Paternoster
- 1956: Osvalda Giardi (2)
- 1957: Osvalda Giardi (3)
- 1958: Osvalda Giardi (4)
- 1959: Marinella Bortoluzzi
- 1960: Osvalda Giardi (5)
- 1961: Marinella Bortoluzzi (2)
- 1962: Osvalda Giardi (6)
- 1963: Marinella Bortoluzzi (3)
- 1964: Osvalda Giardi (7)
- 1965: Gilda Cacciavillani
- 1966: Osvalda Giardi (8)
- 1967: Anna Onofri
- 1968: Annalisa Lanci
- 1969: Rosa Bellamoli
- 1970: Sara Simeoni
- 1971: Sara Simeoni (2)
- 1972: Sara Simeoni (3)
- 1973: Sara Simeoni (4)
- 1974: Sara Simeoni (5)
- 1975: Sara Simeoni (6)
- 1976: Sara Simeoni (7)
- 1977: Sara Simeoni (8)
- 1978: Sara Simeoni (9)
- 1979: Sara Simeoni (10)
- 1980: Sara Simeoni (11)
- 1981: Sandra Dini
- 1982: Sara Simeoni (12)
- 1983: Sara Simeoni (13)
- 1984: Sandra Dini (2)
- 1985: Sara Simeoni (14)
- 1986: Alessandra Fossati
- 1987: Alessandra Bonfigliolo
- 1988: Barbara Fiammengo
- 1989: Roberta Bugarini
- 1990: Barbara Fiammengo (2)
- 1991: Barbara Fiammengo (3)
- 1992: Antonella Bevilacqua
- 1993: Antonella Bevilacqua (2)
- 1994: Antonella Bevilacqua (3)
- 1995: Francesca Sicari
- 1996: Antonella Bevilacqua (4)
- 1997: Antonella Bevilacqua (5)
- 1998: Francesca Bradamante
- 1999: Daniela Galeotti
- 2000: Antonietta Di Martino
- 2001: Antonietta Di Martino (2)
- 2002: Anna Visigalli
- 2003: Antonella Bevilacqua (6)
- 2004: Anna Visigalli (2)
- 2005: Stefania Cadamuro
- 2006: Antonietta Di Martino (3)
- 2007: Antonietta Di Martino (4)
- 2008: Antonietta Di Martino (5)
- 2009: Raffaella Lamera
- 2010: Antonietta Di Martino (6)
- 2011: Raffaella Lamera (2)
- 2012: Chiara Vitobello
- 2013: Alessia Trost
- 2016: Alessia Trost (2)
- 2017: Erika Furlani
- 2018: Elena Vallortigara
- 2019: Alessia Trost (3)
- 2020: Elena Vallortigara (2)
- 2021: Elena Vallortigara (3)
- 2022: Elena Vallortigara (4)

==== Pole vault ====
- 1995: Maria Carla Bresciani
- 1996: Maria Chiara Romano
- 1997: Maria Carla Bresciani
- 1998: Anna Tamburini
- 1999: Maria Carla Bresciani
- 2000: Arianna Farfaletti Casali
- 2001: Maria Carla Bresciani
- 2002: Francesca Dolcini
- 2003: Arianna Farfaletti Casali
- 2004: Maria Carla Bresciani
- 2005: Sara Bruzzese
- 2006: Arianna Farfaletti Casali
- 2007: Anna Giordano Bruno
- 2008: Anna Giordano Bruno
- 2009: Anna Giordano Bruno
- 2010: Elena Scarpellini
- 2011: Anna Giordano Bruno
- 2012: Anna Giordano Bruno
- 2013: Giorgia Benecchi
- 2014: Roberta Bruni
- 2015: Sonia Malavisi
- 2016: Sonia Malavisi
- 2017: Elisa Molinarolo
- 2018: Roberta Bruni
- 2019: Sonia Malavisi
- 2020: Roberta Bruni
- 2021: Elisa Molinarolo
- 2022: Roberta Bruni

==== Shot put ====
Multiwinners
Athlete	Wins
Chiara Rosa	18
Amelia Piccinini	12
Bruna Bertolini	10
Cinzia Petrucci	8
Mara Rosolen	6

- 1927: Pierina Borsani
- 1928: Bruna Bertolini
- 1929: Bruna Bertolini
- 1930: Bruna Bertolini
- 1931: Bruna Bertolini
- 1932: Bruna Bertolini
- 1933: Bruna Bertolini
- 1934: Bruna Bertolini
- 1934: Bruna Bertolini
- 1936: Bruna Bertolini
- 1937: Bruna Bertolini
- 1938: Giorgina Grossi
- 1939: Giorgina Grossi
- 1940: Giorgina Grossi
- 1941: Amelia Piccinini
- 1942: Amelia Piccinini
- 1943: Amelia Piccinini
- 1944: not held
- 1945: Amelia Piccinini
- 1946: Amelia Piccinini
- 1947: Amelia Piccinini
- 1948: Amelia Piccinini
- 1949: Amelia Piccinini
- 1950: Amelia Piccinini
- 1951: Amelia Piccinini
- 1952: Amelia Piccinini
- 1953: Amelia Piccinini
- 1954: Amelia Piccinini
- 1955: Paola Paternoster
- 1956: Paola Paternoster
- 1957: Paola Paternoster
- 1958: Caterina Bedini
- 1959: Paola Paternoster
- 1960: Paola Paternoster
- 1961: Elivia Ricci
- 1962: Claudia Conti
- 1963: Elivia Ricci
- 1964: Elivia Ricci
- 1965: Elivia Ricci
- 1966: Elivia Ricci
- 1967: Silvana Forcellini
- 1968: Silvana Forcellini
- 1969: Silvana Forcellini
- 1970: Silvana Forcellini
- 1971: Maria Stella Masocco
- 1972: Maria Stella Masocco
- 1973: Cinzia Petrucci
- 1974: Cinzia Petrucci
- 1975: Cinzia Petrucci
- 1976: Cinzia Petrucci
- 1977: Cinzia Petrucci
- 1978: Cinzia Petrucci
- 1979: Angela Anzelotti
- 1980: Cinzia Petrucci
- 1981: Cinzia Petrucci
- 1982: Concetta Milanese
- 1983: Concetta Milanese
- 1984: Maria Assunta Chiummariello
- 1985: Concetta Milanese
- 1986: Maria Assunta Chiummariello
- 1987: Maria Assunta Chiummariello
- 1988: Concetta Milanese
- 1989: Agnese Maffeis
- 1990: Agnese Maffeis
- 1991: Agnese Maffeis
- 1992: Agnese Maffeis
- 1993: Agnese Maffeis
- 1994: Mara Rosolen
- 1995: Maria Tranchina
- 1996: Mara Rosolen
- 1997: Mara Rosolen
- 1998: Mara Rosolen
- 1999: Mara Rosolen
- 2000: Mara Rosolen
- 2002: Assunta Legnante
- 2003: Assunta Legnante
- 2004: Assunta Legnante
- 2005: Chiara Rosa
- 2006: Chiara Rosa
- 2007: Chiara Rosa
- 2008: Chiara Rosa
- 2009: Chiara Rosa
- 2010: Chiara Rosa
- 2011: Chiara Rosa
- 2012: Chiara Rosa
- 2013: Chiara Rosa
- 2014: Chiara Rosa
- 2015: Chiara Rosa
- 2016: Chiara Rosa
- 2017: Chiara Rosa
- 2018: Chiara Rosa
- 2019: Chiara Rosa
- 2020: Chiara Rosa
- 2021: Chiara Rosa
- 2022: Chiara Rosa

==== Discus throw ====
Multiwinners
Athlete	Wins
Agnese Maffeis	14
Edera Cordiale; Elivia Ricci	9
Renata Scaglia	7
Laura Bordignon	5

- 1924:Maria Piantanida
- 1925:Andreina Sacco
- 1926:not held
- 1927:Piera Borsani
- 1928:Vittorina Vivenza
- 1929:Vittorina Vivenza
- 1930:Vittorina Vivenza
- 1931:Piera Borsani
- 1932:Jolanda Bacchielli
- 1933:Bruna Bertolini
- 1934:Bruna Bertolini
- 1935:Piera Borsani
- 1936:Nerea Krenn
- 1937:Gabre Gabric
- 1938:Serafina Guidi
- 1939:Gabre Gabric
- 1940:Gabre Gabric
- 1941:Gina Tagliapietra
- 1942:Gabre Gabric
- 1943:Edera Cordiale
- 1944–1945:not held
- 1946:Edera Cordiale
- 1947:Edera Cordiale
- 1948:Edera Cordiale
- 1949:Edera Cordiale
- 1950:Edera Cordiale
- 1951:Edera Cordiale
- 1952:Edera Cordiale
- 1953:Edera Cordiale
- 1954:Gianna Nannetti
- 1955:Paola Paternoster
- 1956:Paola Paternoster
- 1957:Paola Paternoster
- 1958:Elivia Ricci
- 1959:Elivia Ricci
- 1960:Elivia Ricci
- 1961:Elivia Ricci
- 1962:Elivia Ricci
- 1963:Elivia Ricci
- 1964:Elivia Ricci
- 1965:Elivia Ricci
- 1966:Elivia Ricci
- 1967:Franca Pravadelli
- 1968:Roberta Grottini
- 1969:Maria Luisa Fancello
- 1970:Roberta Grottini
- 1971:Roberta Grottini
- 1972:Roberta Grottini
- 1973:Renata Scaglia
- 1974:Renata Scaglia
- 1975:Renata Scaglia
- 1976:Renata Scaglia
- 1977:Maura Zambon
- 1978:Renata Scaglia
- 1979:Maristella Bano
- 1980:Maristella Bano
- 1981:Renata Scaglia
- 1982:Maristella Bano
- 1983:Maristella Bano
- 1984:Renata Scaglia
- 1985:Claudia Paris
- 1986:Sandra Benedet
- 1987:Maria Marello
- 1988:Maria Marello
- 1989:Agnese Maffeis
- 1990:Agnese Maffeis
- 1991:Agnese Maffeis
- 1992:Agnese Maffeis
- 1993:Agnese Maffeis
- 1994:Mara Rosolen
- 1995:Agnese Maffeis
- 1996:Agnese Maffeis
- 1997:Agnese Maffeis
- 1998:Agnese Maffeis
- 1999:Mara Rosolen
- 2000:Agnese Maffeis
- 2001:Agnese Maffeis
- 2002:Agnese Maffeis
- 2003:Agnese Maffeis
- 2004:Agnese Maffeis
- 2005:Cristiana Checchi
- 2006:Laura Bordignon
- 2007:Cristiana Checchi
- 2008:Laura Bordignon
- 2009:Laura Bordignon
- 2010:Laura Bordignon
- 2011:Laura Bordignon
- 2012:Tamara Apostolico
- 2013:Valentina Aniballi
- 2014:Valentina Aniballi
- 2015:Stefania Strumillo
- 2016:Stefania Strumillo
- 2017:Stefania Strumillo
- 2018:Valentina Aniballi
- 2019:Stefania Strumillo
- 2020: Daisy Osakue
- 2021: Daisy Osakue
- 2022: Daisy Osakue

==== Javelin throw ====
Multiwinners
Athlete	Wins
Claudia Coslovich; Ada Turci	13
Giuliana Amici	9
Fausta Quintavalla	8
Zahra Bani	8

- 1927: Piera Borsani
- 1928: Matilde Villani
- 1929: Piera Borsani
- 1930: Jolanda Bacchelli
- 1931: Jolanda Bacchelli
- 1932: Jolanda Bacchelli
- 1933: Jolanda Bacchelli
- 1934: Piera Borsani
- 1935: Piera Borsani
- 1936: Alma Guidi
- 1937: Alma Guidi
- 1938: Caterina Milanesio
- 1939: Etta Ballaben
- 1940: Etta Ballaben
- 1941: Etta Ballaben
- 1942: Etta Ballaben
- 1943: Ada Turci
- 1944:not held
- 1945: Ada Turci
- 1946: Ada Turci
- 1947: Ada Turci
- 1948: Ada Turci
- 1949: Ada Turci
- 1950: Ada Turci
- 1951: Ada Turci
- 1952: Ada Turci
- 1953: Ada Turci
- 1954: Ada Turci
- 1955: Ada Turci
- 1956: Paola Paternoster
- 1957: Paola Paternoster
- 1958: Ada Turci
- 1959: Paola Paternoster
- 1960: Paola Paternoster
- 1961: Paola Paternoster
- 1962: Fernanda Torti
- 1963: Annamaria Mazzacurati
- 1964: Elide Riccobono
- 1965: Elide Riccobono
- 1966: Annamaria Mazzacurati
- 1967: Annamaria Mazzacurati
- 1968: Annamaria Mazzacurati
- 1969: Annamaria Mazzacurati
- 1970: Giuliana Amici
- 1971: Giuliana Amici
- 1972: Giuliana Amici
- 1973: Giuliana Amici
- 1974: Giuliana Amici
- 1975: Giuliana Amici
- 1976: Giuliana Amici
- 1977: Giuliana Amici
- 1978: Giuliana Amici
- 1979: Fausta Quintavalla
- 1980: Fausta Quintavalla
- 1981: Fausta Quintavalla
- 1982: Fausta Quintavalla
- 1983: Fausta Quintavalla
- 1984: Fausta Quintavalla
- 1985: Ambra Giacchetti
- 1986: Fausta Quintavalla
- 1987: Vilma Vidotto
- 1988: Stefania Galbiati
- 1989: Veronica Becuzzi
- 1990: Fausta Quintavalla
- 1991: Veronica Becuzzi
- 1992: Gloria Crippa
- 1993: Claudia Coslovich
- 1994: Claudia Coslovich
- 1995: Claudia Coslovich
- 1996: Claudia Coslovich
- 1997: Claudia Coslovich
- 1998: Claudia Coslovich
- 1999: Claudia Coslovich
- 2000: Claudia Coslovich
- 2001: Claudia Coslovich
- 2002: Claudia Coslovich
- 2003: Claudia Coslovich
- 2004: Elisabetta Marin
- 2005: Zahra Bani
- 2006: Zahra Bani
- 2007: Claudia Coslovich
- 2008: Claudia Coslovich
- 2009: Zahra Bani
- 2010: Zahra Bani
- 2011: Zahra Bani
- 2012: Zahra Bani
- 2013: Sara Jemai
- 2014: Sara Jemai
- 2015: Sara Jemai
- 2016: Eleonora Bacciotti
- 2017: Zahra Bani
- 2018: Sara Jemai
- 2019: Carolina Visca
- 2020: Carolina Visca
- 2021: Zahra Bani
- 2022: Paola Padovan

==== Hammer throw ====
- 1995: Silvia Lazzari
- 1996: Monica Torazzi
- 1997: Maria Tranchina
- 1998: Ester Balassini
- 1999: Ester Balassini
- 2000: Ester Balassini
- 2001: Ester Balassini
- 2002: Clarissa Claretti
- 2003: Clarissa Claretti
- 2004: Alessandra Coaccioli
- 2005: Ester Balassini
- 2006: Clarissa Claretti
- 2007: Clarissa Claretti
- 2008: Clarissa Claretti
- 2009: Clarissa Claretti
- 2010: Silvia Salis
- 2011: Silvia Salis
- 2012: Silvia Salis
- 2013: Micaela Mariani
- 2014: Micaela Mariani
- 2015: Silvia Salis
- 2016: Francesca Massobrio
- 2017: Sara Fantini
- 2018: Sara Fantini
- 2019: Sara Fantini
- 2020: Sara Fantini
- 2021: Sara Fantini
- 2022: Sara Fantini

=== Combined ===
Pentathlon

- 1960: Paola Paternoster
- 1961: Roberta Turba
- 1962: Magaly Vettorazzo
- 1963: Magaly Vettorazzo
- 1964: Osvalda Giardi
- 1965: Magaly Vettorazzo
- 1966: Magaly Vettorazzo
- 1967: Magaly Vettorazzo
- 1968: Loredana Fiori
- 1969: Magaly Vettorazzo
- 1970: Magaly Vettorazzo
- 1971: Barbara Ridi
- 1972: Sara Simeoni
- 1973: Rita Bottiglieri
- 1974: Rita Bottiglieri
- 1975: Loredana Fiori
- 1976: Anna Aldrighetti
- 1977: Anna Aldrighetti
- 1978: Barbara Bachlechner
- 1979: Barbara Bachlechner

Heptathlon

- 1980: Barbara Bachlechner
- 1981: Gabriella Pizzolato
- 1982: Alessandra Becatti
- 1983: Katia Pasquinelli
- 1984: Esmeralda Pecchio
- 1985: Katia Pasquinelli
- 1986: Claudia Del Fabbro
- 1987: Stefania Frisiero
- 1988: Herta Steiner
- 1989: Herta Steiner
- 1990: Ifeoma Ozoeze
- 1991: Claudia Del Fabbro
- 1992: Giuliana Spada
- 1993: Giuliana Spada
- 1994: Karin Periginelli
- 1995: Giuliana Spada
- 1996: Giuliana Spada
- 1997: Gertrud Bacher
- 1998: Gertrud Bacher
- 1999: Karin Periginelli
- 2000: Karin Periginelli
- 2001: Gertrud Bacher
- 2002: Gertrud Bacher
- 2003: Gertrud Bacher
- 2004: Silvia Dalla Piana
- 2005: Elisa Trevisan
- 2006: Elisa Trevisan
- 2007: Elisa Trevisan
- 2008: Francesca Doveri
- 2009: Cecilia Ricali
- 2010: Francesca Doveri
- 2011: Elisa Trevisan
- 2012: Elisa Trevisan
- 2013: Carolina Bianchi
- 2014: Flavia Nasella
- 2015: Federica Palumbo
- 2016: Federica Palumbo
- 2017: Sveva Gerevini
- 2018: Sveva Gerevini
- 2019: Sveva Gerevini
- 2020: Sveva Gerevini
- 2021: Marta Giovannini
- 2022: Marta Giovannini

== See also ==
- List of Italian Athletics Indoor Championships winners
- List of Italian Winter Throwing Championships winners
- Italian Cross Country Championships
- Italian 10 km road Championships
- Italian Winter Throwing Championships
