= 1961 Italian Athletics Championships =

- Host city: Turin
- Level: Senior

The 1961 Italian Athletics Championships was the 51st edition of the Italian Athletics Championships and were held in Turin (track & field events).

== Champions ==
=== Men ===
Event	Athlete	Performance
100 metres	Livio Berruti	10.4
200 metres	Livio Berruti	20.9
400 metres	Mario Fraschini	47.0
800 metres	Francesco Bianchi	1:50.7
1500 metres	Alfredo Rizzo	3:51.8
5000 metres	Antonio Ambu	14:33.6
10,000 metres	Franco Antonelli	30:41.6
110 metres hurdles	Nereo Svara	14.3
400 metres hurdles	Salvatore Morale	51.2
3000 metres steeplechase	Gianfranco Sommaggio	9:14.4
High jump	Walter Zamparelli	1.98
Pole vault	Mario Gaspari	4.05
Long jump	Raffaele Piras	7.37
Triple jump	Enzo Cavalli	15.56
Shot put	Silvano Meconi	16.95
Discus throw	Carmelo Rado	52.72
Hammer throw	Manlio Cristin	59.15
Javelin throw	Carlo Lievore	75.48*
Decathlon	Franco Sar	5856
Half Marathon	Antonio Ambu	1:02:09#
Marathon	Francesco Perrone	02:27:22
10,000 metres track walk	Abdon Pamich	45:11.4
20 km road walk	Abdon Pamich	01:33:34
50 km road walk	Abdon Pamich	04:33:05
Cross country (long course)	Francesco Perrone	

=== Women ===
Event	Athlete	Performance
100 metres	Donata Govoni	12.0
200 metres	Donata Govoni	24.8
400 metres	Maria La Barbera	57.1
800 metres	Gilda Jannaccone	2:13.4
1500 metres	-	-
3000 metres	-	-
100 metres hurdles	Letizia Bertoni	11.6*
400 metres hurdles	-	-
3000 metres steeplechase	-	-
High jump	Marinella Bortoluzzi	1.63
Pole vault	-	-
Long jump	Magaly Vettorazzo	5.82
Triple jump	-	-
Shot put	Elivia Ricci	13.04
Discus throw	Elivia Ricci	48.71
Hammer throw	-	-
Javelin throw	Paola Paternoster	43.90*
Pentathlon	Roberta Turba	4150p
Marathon	-	-
Cross country (long course)	Gilda Jannaccone	
