= 1967 Italian Athletics Championships =

- Dates: 7–9 July
- Host city: Bologna
- Level: Senior

The 1967 Italian Athletics Championships was the 57th edition of the Italian Athletics Championships and were held in Bologna (track & field events).

== Champions ==
=== Men ===
| Event | Athlete | Performance |
|---|---|---|
| 100 metres | Pasquale Giannattasio | 10.6 |
| 200 metres | Ippolito Giani | 21.3 |
| 400 metres | Sergio Bello | 48.4 |
| 800 metres | Francesco Bianchi | 1:48.7 |
| 1500 metres | Francesco Arese | 3:50.4 |
| 5000 metres | Antonio Ambu | 14:18.4 |
| 10,000 metres | Antonio Ambu | 29:44.0 |
| 110 metres hurdles | Eddy Ottoz | 13.9 |
| 400 metres hurdles | Alessandro Scatena | 52.6 |
| 3000 metres steeplechase | Giovanni Pizzi | 8:57.4 |
| High jump | Vittoriano Drovandi | 2.08 |
| Pole vault | Renato Dionisi | 4.40 |
| Long jump | Pasquale Santoro | 7.46 |
| Triple jump | Pierluigi Gatti | 15.57 |
| Shot put | Silvano Meconi | 17.17 |
| Discus throw | Silvano Simeon | 57.50 |
| Hammer throw | Gian Paolo Urlando | 61.58 |
| Javelin throw | Franco Radman | 75.12* |
| Decathlon | Bruno Poserina | 6801 |
| Half Marathon | Antonio Ambu | 1:07:10 |
| Marathon | Antonio Ambu | 02:27:04 |
| 10,000 metres track walk | Abdon Pamich | 44:52.2 |
| 20 km road walk | Abdon Pamich | 01:33:09 |
| 50 km road walk | Abdon Pamich | 04:21:18 |
| Cross country (long course) | Antonio Ambu | |

=== Women ===
| Event | Athlete | Performance |
|---|---|---|
| 100 metres | Donata Govoni | 12.3 |
| 200 metres | Donata Govoni | 24.8 |
| 400 metres | Paola Pigni | 56.7 |
| 800 metres | Paola Pigni | 2:10.2 |
| 1500 metres | - | - |
| 3000 metres | - | - |
| 100 metres hurdles | Magaly Vettorazzo | 11.6* |
| 400 metres hurdles | - | - |
| 3000 metres steeplechase | - | - |
| High jump | Anna Onofri | 1.57 |
| Pole vault | - | - |
| Long jump | Magaly Vettorazzo | 5.76 |
| Triple jump | - | - |
| Shot put | Silvana Forcellini | 13.35 |
| Discus throw | Franca Pravadelli | 43.42 |
| Hammer throw | - | - |
| Javelin throw | Maria Mazzacurati | 42.48* |
| Pentathlon | Magaly Vettorazzo | 4264p |
| Marathon | - | - |
| Cross country (long course) | Paola Pigni | |
