= 1959 Italian Athletics Championships =

Edition of the Italian Athletics Championships

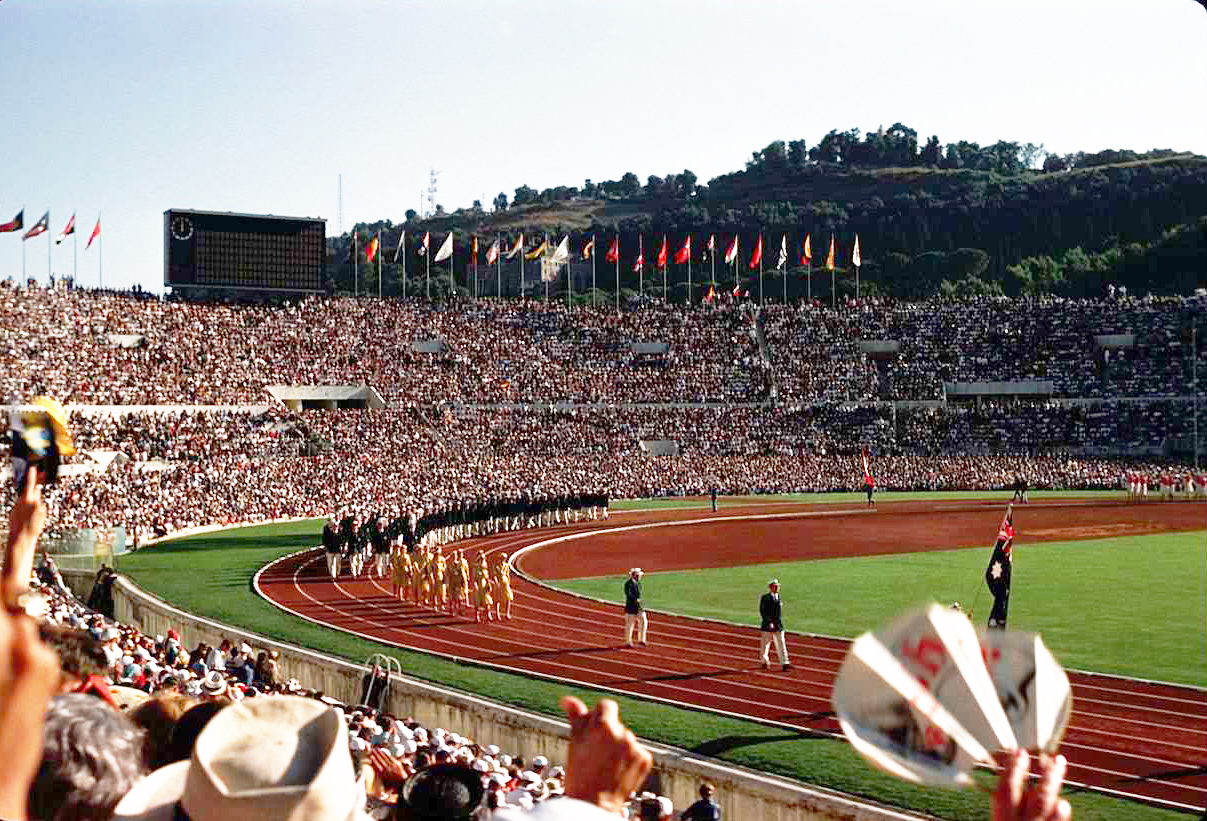
- Olympic Stadium during the Rome 1960 opening day the year after this event
- Dates: 23–25 September
- Host city: Rome
- Venue: Olympic Stadium
- Level: Senior
- Events: 37 (25 men, 12 women)

The 1959 Italian Athletics Championships was the 49th edition of the Italian Athletics Championships and were held in Rome (main event) from 23 to 25 September.

== Champions ==
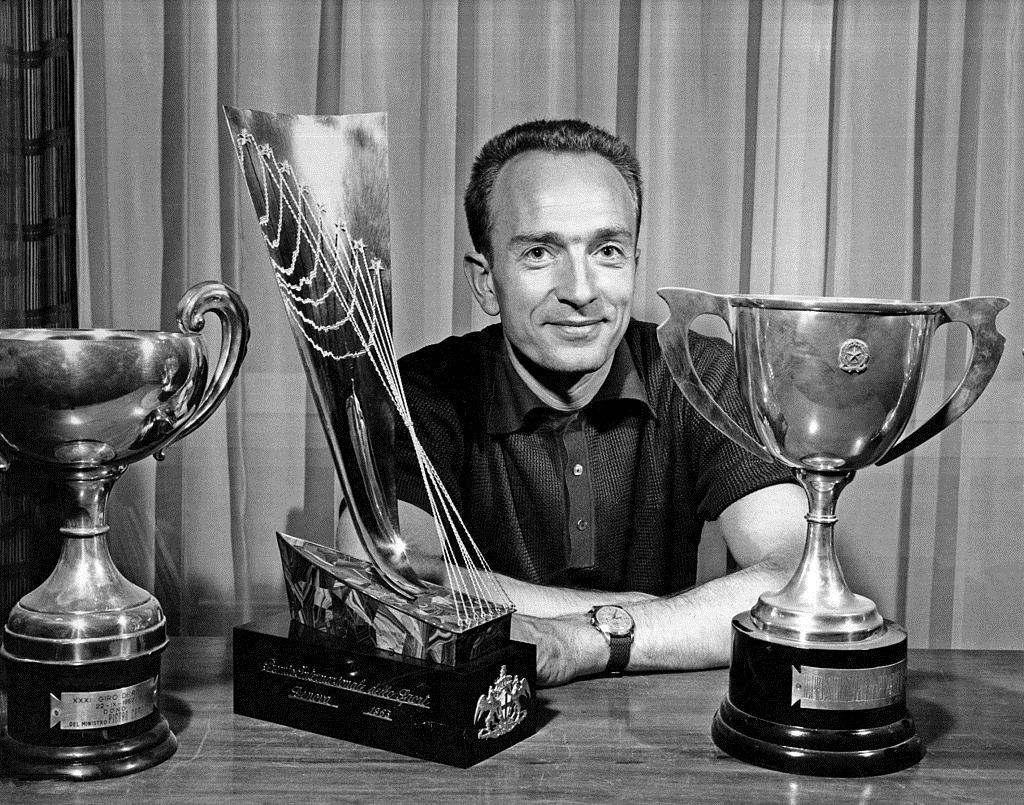
Abdon Pamich three national titles in the racewalking at this edition of Championships.

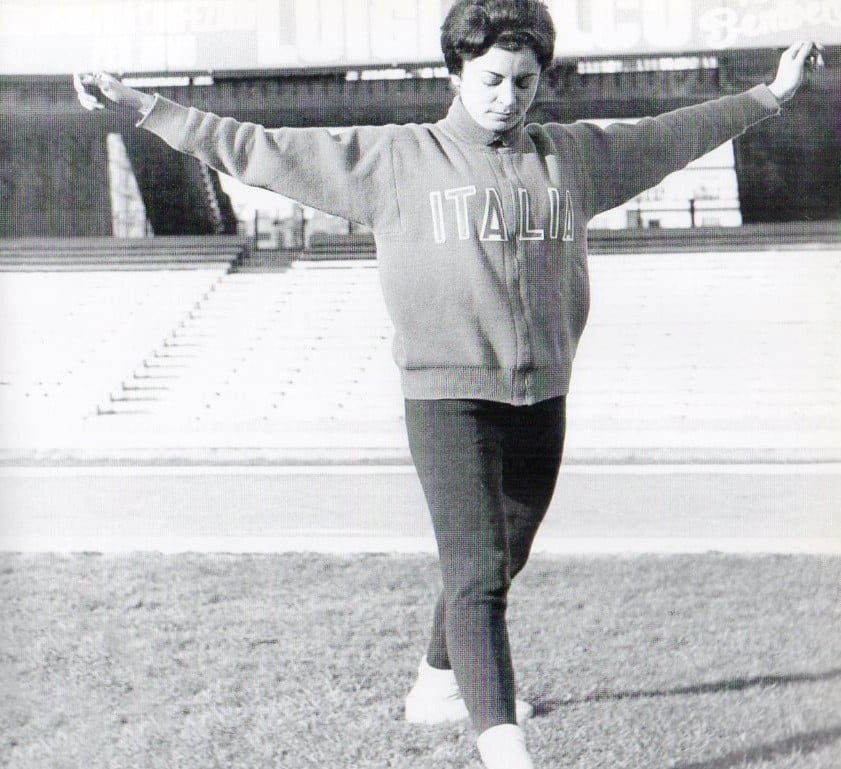
Gilda Jannaccone two national titles in the middle-distance running at this edition of Championships.

Full results.

Track events
Event	Men	Performance	Women	Performance
100 m	Livio Berruti	10.5	Giusy Leone	11.7
200 m	Livio Berruti	21.0	Giusy Leone	24.8
400 m	Renato Panciera	47.5	Danila Costa	56.7
800 m	Gianfranco Baraldi	1:51.9	Gilda Jannaccone	2:14.6
1500 m	Alfredo Rizzo	3:51.0		
5000 m	Luigi Conti	14:24.0		
10,000 m	Enzo Volpi	30.05.8		
110/80 m hs	Nereo Svara	14.3	Letizia Bertoni	11.4
400 m hs	Moreno Martini	51.6		
3000 m st	Onofrio Costa	9:21.5		
10,000 m walk	Abdon Pamich	46:14:0		
Field events
High jump	Gianpiero Cordovani	1.97 m	Marinella Bertoluzzi	1.61 m
Pole vault	Giulio Chiesa	4.20 m		
Long jump	Attilio Bravi	7.30 m	Piera Tizzoni	5.60 m
Triple jump	Enzo Cavalli	15.68 m		
Shot put	Silvano Meconi	17.88 m	Paola Paternoster	12.63 m
Discus throw	Adolfo Consolini	52.63 m	Elivia Ricci	45.23 m
Hammer throw	Manlio Cristin	58.65 m		
Javelin throw	Carlo Lievore	75.14 m	Paola Paternoster	42.44 m
Combined
Decathlon/Pentathlon	Franco Sar	6733 pts	Maria Musso	3945 pts
Road events
Half marathon (20 km)	Silvio De Florentiis	1:06:04.6		
Marathon	Enrico Masante	2:39:20.0		
20 km walk	Abdon Pamich	1:35:44.0		
50 km walk	Abdon Pamich	4:26:57.0		
Cross country
Cross (8 km/1.2 km)	Antonio Ambu	25:16.0	Gilda Jannaccone	4:21.2
