= 1911 Italian Athletics Championships =

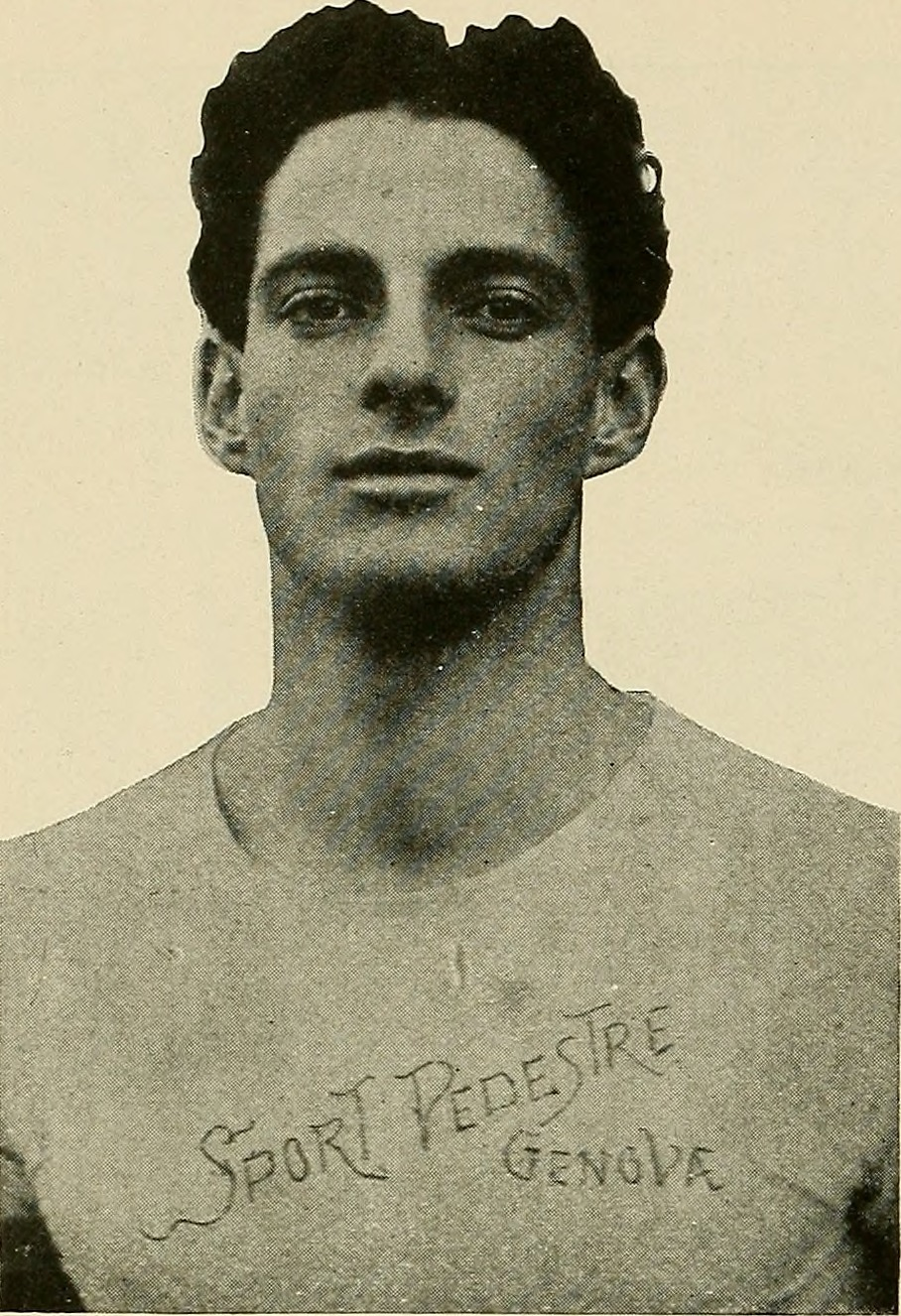
- In 1911 Emilio Lunghi won, on 1000 metres, one of his 9 national championships.
- Dates: 7–9 September
- Host city: Rome
- Level: Senior
- Events: 13

The 1911 Italian Athletics Championships were held in Rome. It was the sixth edition of the Italian Athletics Championships.

== Champions ==
Event	Athlete	Performance
100 m	Franco Giongo	11.5
400 m	Franco Giongo	60.8
1000 m	Emilio Lunghi	2:40.2
5000 m	Alfonso Orlando	16:34.6
Half marathon (20 km track)	Adolfo Testoni	1:13:31.2
Marathon (40+ km)	Orlando Cesaroni	2:41:27.0
110 m hurdles	Daciano Colbachini	17.6
1200 m steeplechase	Massimo Cartasegna	3:41.8
1500 m walk	Fernando Altimani	6:25.8
10,000 m walk	Fernando Altimani	49:03.6
Cross country running (11 km)	Giuseppe Cattro	38:09.6
4×440 yards relay	Sport Club Italia Milan; Geremia Della Torre, Emilio Lunghi, Angelo Vigani, Catullo Zanier	3:59.6
Olympic relay	Sport Club Italia Milan; Geremia Della Torre, Mario Riccoboni, Angelo Vigani, Catullo Zanier	4:12.2
