= 1965 Italian Athletics Championships =

- Dates: 9–11 July
- Host city: Rome
- Level: Senior

The 1965 Italian Athletics Championships was the 55th edition of the Italian Athletics Championships and were held in Rome (track & field events).

== Champions ==
=== Men ===
Event	Athlete	Performance
100 metres	Pasquale Giannattasio	10.5
200 metres	Livio Berruti	21.3
400 metres	Sergio Bello	47.0
800 metres	Francesco Bianchi	1:48.3
1500 metres	Francesco Bianchi	3:45.5
5000 metres	Antonio Ambu	14:04.2
10,000 metres	Antonio Ambu	29:40.0
110 metres hurdles	Eddy Ottoz	14.2
400 metres hurdles	Roberto Frinolli	50.6
3000 metres steeplechase	Massimo Begnis	8:53.2
High jump	Vittoriano Drovandi	2.00
Pole vault	Renato Dionisi	4.40
Long jump	Marco Fornaciari	7.34
Triple jump	Giuseppe Gentile	15.27
Shot put	Silvano Meconi	17.25
Discus throw	Franco Grossi	55.17
Hammer throw	Walter Bernardini	56.88
Javelin throw	Vanni Rodeghiero	78.46*
Decathlon	Franco Sar	7368
Half Marathon	Antonio Ambu	59:20#
Marathon	Antonio Ambu	02:28:18
10,000 metres track walk	Abdon Pamich	44:36.2
20 km road walk	Abdon Pamich	01:39:37
50 km road walk	Abdon Pamich	04:16:31
Cross country (long course)	Luigi Conti	

=== Women ===
Event	Athlete	Performance
100 metres	Donata Govoni	11.9
200 metres	Donata Govoni	25.3
400 metres	Paola Pigni	56.4
800 metres	Paola Pigni	2:17.1
1500 metres	-	-
3000 metres	-	-
100 metres hurdles	Magaly Vettorazzo	11.9*
400 metres hurdles	-	-
3000 metres steeplechase	-	-
High jump	Gilda Cacciavillani	1.60
Pole vault	-	-
Long jump	Maria Vittoria Trio	6.03
Triple jump	-	-
Shot put	Elivia Ballotta Ricci	13.19
Discus throw	Elivia Ballotta Ricci	51.81
Hammer throw	-	-
Javelin throw	Elide Riccabono	40.33*
Pentathlon	Magaly Vettorazzo	4104p
Marathon	-	-
Cross country (long course)	Fernanda Ferrucci	
