= 1908 Italian Athletics Championships =

- Dates: 17–18 September
- Host city: Rome
- Level: Senior
- Events: 12

The 1908 Italian Athletics Championships were held in Rome. It was the third edition of the Italian Athletics Championships.

== Champions ==
Event	Athlete	Performance
100 m	Umberto Barozzi	11.2
400 m	Emilio Lunghi	52.5
1000 m	Emilio Lunghi	2.31.0
5000 m	Pericle Pagliani	16:07.8
Half marathon (20 km track)	Dorando Pietri	1.10:54.6
Marathon (40 km track)	Umberto Blasi	3:01:04
110 m hurdles	Alfredo Pagani	16.6
1200 m steeplechase	Massimo Cartasegna	3:46.2
1500 m walk	Pietro Fontana	6:42.0
10,000 m walk	Angelo Claro	50:52.8
40 km walk track	Antonio Navoni	4:07:37
Cross country running (12 km)	Pericle Pagliani	49:12
