= 1912 Italian Athletics Championships =

- Dates: 16–19 May
- Host city: Verona
- Level: Senior
- Events: 13

The 1912 Italian Athletics Championships were held in Verona. It was the seventh edition of the Italian Athletics Championships.

== Champions ==
Event	Athlete	Performance
100 m	Franco Giongo	11.2
400 m	Franco Giongo	53.2
1000 m	Emilio Lunghi	2.40.2
5000 m	Alfonso Orlando	16:13.4
Half marathon (20 km track)	Carlo Speroni	1:11:29.4
Marathon (40 km)	Giovanni Beltrandi	3:10:02.8
110 m hurdles	Daciano Colbachini	16.4
1200 m steeplechase	Emilio Lunghi	4:00.6
1500 m walk	Fernando Altimani	6:31.0
10,000 m walk	Fernando Altimani	48:20.4
40 km walk	Donato Pavesi	3:57:00.0
4×440 yards relay	Sport Club Italia; Roberto Bacolla, Massimo Cartasegna, Emilio Lunghi, Catullo Zanier	4:00.8
Olympic relay	Sport Club Italia; Roberto Bacolla, Massimo Cartasegna, Emilio Lunghi, Catullo Zanier	3:52.4
Cross country running	not held	
