= 1966 Italian Athletics Championships =

- Dates: 8–10 July
- Host city: Florence
- Level: Senior

The 1966 Italian Athletics Championships was the 56th edition of the Italian Athletics Championships and were held in Florence (track & field events).

== Champions ==
=== Men ===
Event	Athlete	Performance
100 metres	Pasquale Giannattasio	10.5
200 metres	Sergio Ottolina	21.1
400 metres	Sergio Bello	47.3
800 metres	Gianfranco Carabelli	1:52.5
1500 metres	Francesco Arese	3:54.0
5000 metres	Renzo Finelli	14:16.2
10,000 metres	Antonio Ambu	30:12.4
110 metres hurdles	Eddy Ottoz	14.0
400 metres hurdles	Roberto Frinolli	50.7
3000 metres steeplechase	Massimo Begnis	9:05.2
High jump	Erminio Azzaro	2.08
Pole vault	Renato Dionisi	4.80
Long jump	Pierluigi Gatti	7.39
Triple jump	Giuseppe Gentile	15.43
Shot put	Michele Sorrenti	17.13
Discus throw	Silvano Simeon	54.66
Hammer throw	Walter Bernardini	58.09
Javelin throw	Vanni Rodeghiero	76.78*
Decathlon	Sergio Rossetti	6980
Half Marathon	Antonio Ambu	1:02:19#
Marathon	Antonio Ambu	02:22:25
10,000 metres track walk	Abdon Pamich	44:46.4
20 km road walk	Abdon Pamich	01:31:29
50 km road walk	Abdon Pamich	04:18:03
Cross country (long course)	Antonio Ambu	

=== Women ===
Event	Athlete	Performance
100 metres	Donata Govoni	12.2
200 metres	Donata Govoni	24.3
400 metres	Donata Govoni	55.2
800 metres	Paola Pigni	2:09.5
1500 metres	-	-
3000 metres	-	-
100 metres hurdles	Magaly Vettorazzo	11.5*
400 metres hurdles	-	-
3000 metres steeplechase	-	-
High jump	Osvalda Giardi	1.60
Pole vault	-	-
Long jump	Magaly Vettorazzo	5.85
Triple jump	-	-
Shot put	Elivia Ballotta	14.13
Discus throw	Elivia Ballotta	50.06
Hammer throw	-	-
Javelin throw	Maria Mazzacurati	42.14*
Pentathlon	Magaly Vettorazzo	4254p
Marathon	-	-
Cross country (long course)	Fernanda Ferrucci	
