= 1909 Italian Athletics Championships =

- Dates: 4–5 June
- Host city: Rome
- Level: Senior
- Events: 12

The 1909 Italian Athletics Championships were held in Rome. It was the fourth edition of the Italian Athletics Championships.

== Champions ==
Event	Athlete	Performance
100 m	Guido Brignone	11.2
400 m	Guido Brignone	53.8
1000 m	Massimo Cartasegna	2.42.2
5000 m	Ezio Cappellini	16:04.2
10 km	Pericle Pagliani	38:00.0
Half marathon (20 km road)	Armando Pagliani	1:11:22.6
Marathon (40 km road)	Umberto Blasi	2:46:30
110 m hurdles	Ezio Massa	18.8
1200 m steeplechase	Massimo Cartasegna	3:41.8
1500 m walk	Pietro Fontana	6:31.4
10 km walk	Pietro Fontana	46:42.0
40 km walk	Silla Del Sole	3:56:30
