= 1981 Italian Athletics Championships =

- Dates: 14–15 July
- Host city: Turin
- Level: Senior

The 1981 Italian Athletics Championships was the 71st edition of the Italian Athletics Championships and were held in Turin (track & field events).

== Champions ==
=== Men ===
Event	Athlete	Performance
100 metres	Diego Nodari	10.61
200 metres	Giovanni Bongiorni	20.82
400 metres	Mauro Zuliani	45.34
800 metres	Carlo Grippo	1:47.62
1500 metres	Claudio Patrignani	3:46.77
5000 metres	Piero Selvaggio	13:49.88
10,000 metres	Alberto Cova	28:59.74
110 metres hurdles	Daniele Fontecchio	13.83
400 metres hurdles	Giovanni Evangelisti	7.70
3000 metres steeplechase	Mariano Scartezzini	8:37.15
High jump	Oscar Raise	2.24
Pole vault	Vincenzo Bellone	5.10
Long jump	Fulvio Zorn	50.56
Triple jump	Paolo Piapan	16.08
Shot put	Luigi De Santis	19.20
Discus throw	Armando De Vincentis	59.70
Hammer throw	Gian Paolo Urlando	73.22
Javelin throw	Agostino Ghesini	79.66*
Decathlon	Alessandro Brogini	7413
Half Marathon	Massimo Magnani	1:35:20*
Marathon	Giampaolo Messina	02:15:41
10,000 metres track walk	Maurizio Damilano	41:24.75
20 km road walk	Maurizio Damilano	01:24:11
50 km road walk	Vittorio Visini	04:07:17
Cross country (long course)	Claudio Solone	
Mountain running	Privato Pezzoli	

=== Women ===
Event	Athlete	Performance
100 metres	Marisa Masullo	11.61
200 metres	Marisa Masullo	23.67
800 metres	Gabriella Dorio	2:01.05
800 metres	Gabriella Dorio	4:03.27
3000 metres	Silvana Cruciata	8:50.74
100 metres hurdles	Patrizia Lombardo	13.60
400 metres hurdles	Giuseppina Cirulli	58.35
400 metres hurdles	Erica Rossi	53.39
High jump	Sandra Dini	1.91
Long jump	Elena Cafaro	6.21
Shot put	Cinzia Petrucci	16.44
Discus throw	Renata Scaglia	51.58
Javelin throw	Fausta Quintavalla	57.68*
Heptathlon	Gabriella Pizzolato	5002
Half Marathon	Alba Milana	1:18:03*
Marathon	Silvana Cruciata	02:45:23
5000 Metres Track Walk	Paola Pastorini	27:28.55
Cross country (long course)	Agnese Possamai	
Mountain running	Agnese Possamai	
