= 1976 Italian Athletics Championships =

- Dates: 6–8 July
- Host city: Turin
- Level: Senior

The 1976 Italian Athletics Championships was the 66th edition of the Italian Athletics Championships and were held in Turin (track & field events).

== Champions ==
=== Men ===
Event	Athlete	Performance
100 metres	Vincenzo Guerini	10.4
200 metres	Pietro Mennea	20.5
400 metres	Alfonso Di Guida	46.2
800 metres	Carlo Grippo	1:45.3
1500 metres	Vittorio Fontanella	3:42.5
5000 metres	Giuseppe Gerbi	14:11.0
10,000 metres	Venanzio Ortis	29:38.0
110 metres hurdles	Giuseppe Buttari	13.7
400 metres hurdles	Franco Mazzetti	51.3
3000 metres steeplechase	Roberto Volpi	8:45.0
High jump	Lorenzo Bianchi	2.22
Pole vault	Silvio Fraquelli	5.10
Long jump	Roberto Veglia	7.80
Triple jump	Paolo Piapan	16.20
Shot put	Marco Montelatici	19.06
Discus throw	Armando De Vincentis	61.40
Hammer throw	Gian Paolo Urlando	71.42
Javelin throw	Renzo Cramerotti	72.68*
Decathlon	Daniele Faraggiana	7364
Half Marathon	Franco Fava	1:35:37*
Marathon	Giuseppe Cindolo	02:11:51
10,000 metres track walk	-	-
20 km road walk	Vittorio Canini	01:28:54
50 km road walk	Paolo Grecucci	04:09:28
Cross country (long course)	Franco Fava	

=== Women ===
Event	Athlete	Performance
100 metres	Rita Bottiglieri	11.5
200 metres	Rita Bottiglieri	23.5
400 metres	Erica Rossi	54.2
800 metres	Gabriella Dorio	2:03.9
1500 metres	Gabriella Dorio	4:26.9
3000 metres	Margherita Gargano	9:12.2
100 metres hurdles	Ileana Ongar	13.1
400 metres hurdles	-	-
3000 metres steeplechase	-	-
High jump	Sara Simeoni	1.90
Pole vault	-	-
Long jump	Laura Nappi	6.04
Triple jump	-	-
Shot put	Cinzia Petrucci	16.32
Discus throw	Renata Scaglia	49.94
Hammer throw	-	-
Javelin throw	Giuliana Amici	52.14*
Pentathlon	Anna Aldrighetti	3933p
Marathon	-	-
Cross country (long course)	Gabriella Dorio	
