= 1960 Italian Athletics Championships =

- Dates: 25–27 September
- Host city: Bologna
- Level: Senior

The 1960 Italian Athletics Championships was the 50th edition of the Italian Athletics Championships and were held in Bologna on 25–27 September (track & field events).

== Champions ==
=== Men ===
Event	Athlete	Performance
100 metres	Livio Berruti	10.5
200 metres	Livio Berruti	20.8
400 metres	Mario Fraschini	47.5
800 metres	Mario Fraschini	1:52.5
1500 metres	Alfredo Rizzo	3:48.5
5000 metres	Luigi Conti	14.19.0
10,000 metres	Luigi Conti	29:43.2
110 metres hurdles	Giovanni Cornacchia	14.3
400 metres hurdles	Salvatore Morale	52.2
3000 metres steeplechase	Enzo Volpi	9:16.3
High jump	Brunello Martini	1.98
Pole vault	Angelo Baronchelli	4.15
Long jump	Attilio Bravi	7.27
Triple jump	Pierluigi Gatti	15.61
Shot put	Silvano Meconi	17.46
Discus throw	Adolfo Consolini	53.75
Hammer throw	Ennio Boschini	56.07
Javelin throw	Carlo Lievore	76.21*
Decathlon	Franco Sar	6816
Half Marathon	Silvio De Florentis	1:28:58**
Marathon	Rino Lavelli	02:25:19
10,000 metres track walk	Abdon Pamich	45:19.4
20 km road walk	Abdon Pamich	01:38:42
50 km road walk	Abdon Pamich	04:23:02
Cross country (long course)	Franco Volpi	

=== Women ===
Event	Athlete	Performance
100 metres	Giuseppina Leone	11.4
200 metres	Giuseppina Leone	23.7
400 metres	Danila Costa	56.6
800 metres	Gilda Jannaccone	2:12.2
1500 metres	-	-
3000 metres	-	-
100 metres hurdles	Letizia Bertoni	11.3*
400 metres hurdles	-	-
3000 metres steeplechase	-	-
High jump	Osvalda Giardi	1.60
Pole vault	-	-
Long jump	Piera Tizzoni	5.78
Triple jump	-	-
Discus throw	Elivia Ricci	44.91
Hammer throw	-	-
Shot put	Paola Paternoster	13.36
Javelin throw	Paola Paternoster	43.26*
Pentathlon	Paola Paternoster	3902p
Marathon	-	-
Cross country (long course)	Gilda Jannaccone	
