= 1980 Italian Athletics Championships =

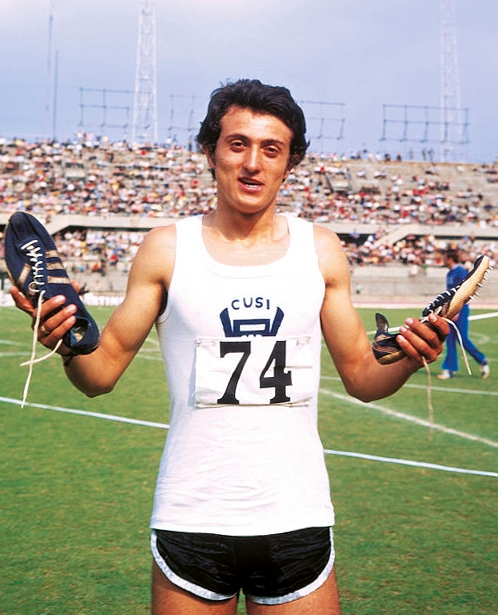
- Pietro Mennea, after 1974 and 1978, hits his 3rd and last target double 100 m + 200 m.
- Dates: 24–26 July
- Host city: Turin
- Level: Senior

The 1980 Italian Athletics Championships was the 70th edition of the Italian Athletics Championships and were held in Turin (track & field events).

== Champions ==
=== Men ===
Event	Athlete	Result
100 m	Pietro Mennea	10.19
200 m	Pietro Mennea	20.38
400 m	Stefano Malinverni	46.48
800 m	Carlo Grippo	1:47.3a
1500 m	Carlo Grippo	3:42.5a
5000 m	Alberto Cova	13:47.8a
10,000 m	Claudio Solone	28:55.0a
110 m hurdles	Gianni Ronconi	14.13
400 m hurdles	Giorgio Ballati	50.61
3000 m steeplechase	Roberto Volpi	8:35.2a
High jump	Massimo Di Giorgio	2.26
Pole vault	Vincenzo Bellone	5.20
Long jump	Maurizio Maffi	7.67
Triple jump	Alessandro Ussi	15.91
Shot put	Angelo Groppelli	19.56
Discus throw	Armando De Vincentis	62.42
Hammer throw	Gian Paolo Urlando	76.52
Javelin throw	Vanni Rodeghiero	73.66*
Decathlon	Hubert Indra	7357
Half Marathon	Paolo Accaputo	1:32:31*
Marathon	Michelangelo Arena	02:16:17
10,000 m track walk	Carlo Mattioli	40:46.1a
20 km road walk	Maurizio Damilano	01:23:16
50 km road walk	Domenico Carpentieri	04:06:43
Cross country (long)	Venanzio Ortis	
Mountain running	Claudio Simi	

=== Women ===
Event	Athlete	Result
100 m	Marisa Masullo	11.29
200 m	Marisa Masullo	23.44
400 m	Erica Rossi	53.29
800 m	Gabriella Dorio	2:00.8a
1500 m	Gabriella Dorio	4:12.8a
3000 m	Margherita Gargano	8:59.9a
100 m hurdles	Antonella Battaglia	14.01
400 m hurdles	Giuseppina Cirulli	60.48
High jump	Sara Simeoni	1.90
Long jump	Giusy Albanese	6.22
Shot put	Cinzia Petrucci	17.72
Discus throw	Maristella Bano	55.14
Javelin throw	Fausta Quintavalla	63.92*
Pentathlon	Barbara Bachlechner	3988p
Half Marathon	Laura Fogli	1:17:04*
Marathon	Maria Pia D'Orlando	02:49:23
Cross country (long)	Agnese Possamai	
Mountain running	Agnese Possamai	
