= 1957 Italian Athletics Championships =

Edition of the Italian Athletics Championships

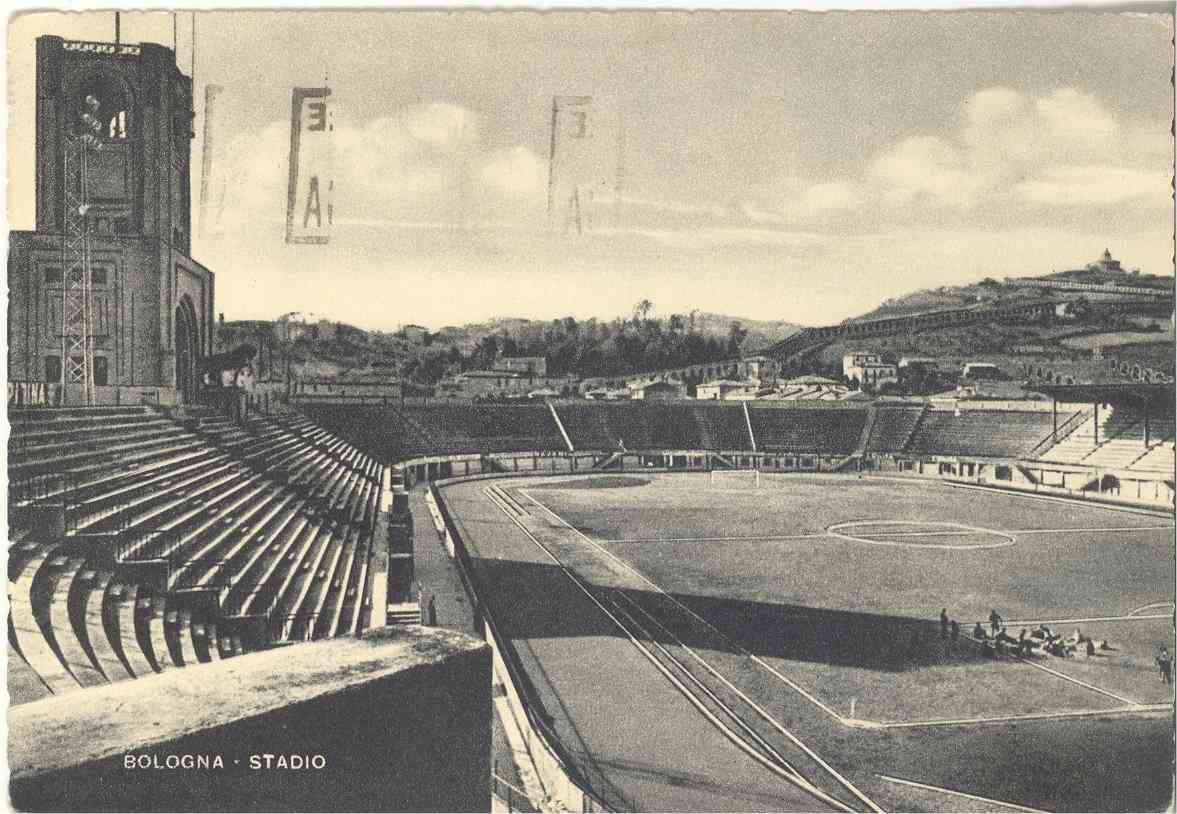
- A picture of the Stadio Dallara in 1949
- Dates: 13–15 September
- Host city: Bologna
- Venue: Stadio Dallara
- Level: Senior
- Events: 37 (25 men, 12 women)

The 1957 Italian Athletics Championships was the 47th edition of the Italian Athletics Championships and were held in Bologna (main event) from 13 to 15 September.

== Champions ==
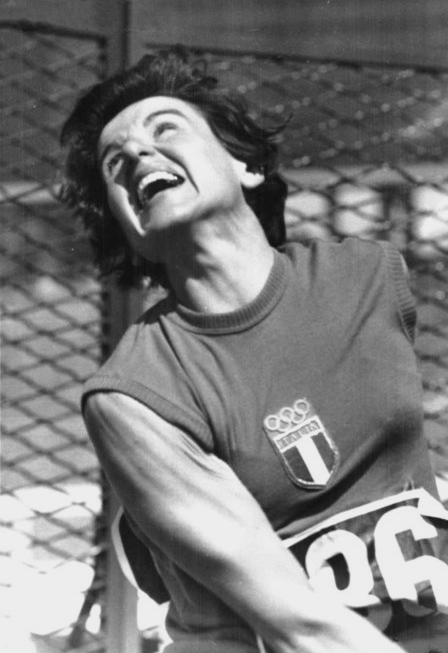
Paola Paternoster three titles, all in the throws, at this edition of championships. Again such as 1956.

This year was the first time of the women's 400 metres.

Full results.

Track events
Event	Men	Performance	Women	Performance
100 m	Livio Berruti	10.6	Giusy Leone	12.0
200 m	Livio Berruti	22.1	Giusy Leone	25.3
400 m	Adriano Loddo	48.6	Delma Savorelli	59.0
800 m	Giovanni Scavo	1:51.1	Vita Virgilio	2:18.7
1500 m	Gianfranco Baraldi	3:49.4		
5000 m	Gianfranco Baraldi	14:34.6		
10,000 m	Francesco Perrone	31:05.2		
110/80 m hs	Giorgio Mazza	14.7	Maria Musso	11.5
400 m hs	Salvatore Morale	51.8		
3000 m st	Vincenzo Leone	9:34.8		
10,000 m walk	Pino Dordoni	45:44:8		
Field events
High jump	Gianpiero Cordovani	1.94 m	Osvalda Giardi	1.63 m
Pole vault	Edmondo Ballotta	4.00 m		
Long jump	Attilio Bravi	7.42 m	Piera Fassio	5.39 m
Triple jump	Pier Luigi Gatti	15.21 m		
Shot put	Silvano Meconi	16.70 m	Paola Paternoster	12.93 m
Discus throw	Adolfo Consolini	51.73 m	Paola Paternoster	44.74 m
Hammer throw	Silvano Giovannetti	55.26 m		
Javelin throw	Carlo Lievore	74.00 m	Paola Paternoster	42.95 m
Combined
Decathlon/Pentathlon	Guido Cappellari	5376 pts	Maria Musso	3995 pts
Road events
Half marathon (20 km)	Giacomo Peppicelli	1:03:30.6		
Marathon	Rino Lavelli	2:36:29.4		
20 km walk	Pino Dordoni	1:34:03.6		
50 km walk	Abdon Pamich	4:45:4.0		
Cross country
Cross (7 km/1.2 km)	Franco Volpi	24:24	Vita Virgilio	...
