= 1974 Italian Athletics Championships =

- Dates: 30 July–1 August
- Host city: Rome
- Level: Senior

The 1974 Italian Athletics Championships was the 64th edition of the Italian Athletics Championships and were held in Rome (track & field events).

== Champions ==
=== Men ===
Event	Athlete	Performance
100 metres	Pietro Mennea	10.35
200 metres	Pietro Mennea	20.53
400 metres	Alfonso Di Guida	47.35
800 metres	Carlo Grippo	1:50.30
1500 metres	Luigi Zarcone	3:44.89
5000 metres	Giuseppe Cindolo	13:55.90
10,000 metres	Giuseppe Cindolo	29:21.00
110 metres hurdles	Giuseppe Buttari	13.99
400 metres hurdles	Giorgio Ballati	50.25
3000 metres steeplechase	Franco Fava	8:35.65
High jump	Enzo Del Forno	2.17
Pole vault	Silvio Fraquelli	5.00
Long jump	Carlo Molinaris	7.65
Triple jump	Ezio Buzzelli	15.59
Shot put	Flavio Asta	18.54
Discus throw	Silvano Simeon	59.98
Hammer throw	Faustino De Boni	68.44
Javelin throw	Vanni Rodeghiero	74.10*
Decathlon	Mauro Bettela	7271
Half Marathon	Giuseppe Cindolo	1:33:50*
Marathon	Giuseppe Cindolo	02:15:42
10,000 metres track walk	-	-
20 km road walk	Armando Zambaldo	01:32:40
50 km road walk	Vittorio Visini	04:06:04
Cross country (long course)	Franco Fava	

=== Women ===
Event	Athlete	Performance
100 metres	Cecilia Molinari	11.70
200 metres	Laura Nappi	23.80
400 metres	Donata Govoni	54.70
800 metres	Gabriella Dorio	2:07.70
1500 metres	Paola Pigni-Cacchi	4:13.91
3000 metres	Paola Pigni-Cacchi	9:09.15
100 metres hurdles	Ileana Ongar	13.89
400 metres hurdles	-	-
3000 metres steeplechase	-	-
High jump	Sara Simeoni	1.80
Pole vault	-	-
Long jump	Ambra Colombo	5.88
Triple jump	-	-
Shot put	Cinzia Petrucci	16.02
Discus throw	Renata Scaglia	48.74
Hammer throw	-	-
Javelin throw	Giuliana Amici	53.18*
Pentathlon	Rita Bottiglieri	3906p
Marathon	-	-
Cross country (long course)	Paola Pigni-Cacchi	
