= 1907 Italian Athletics Championships =

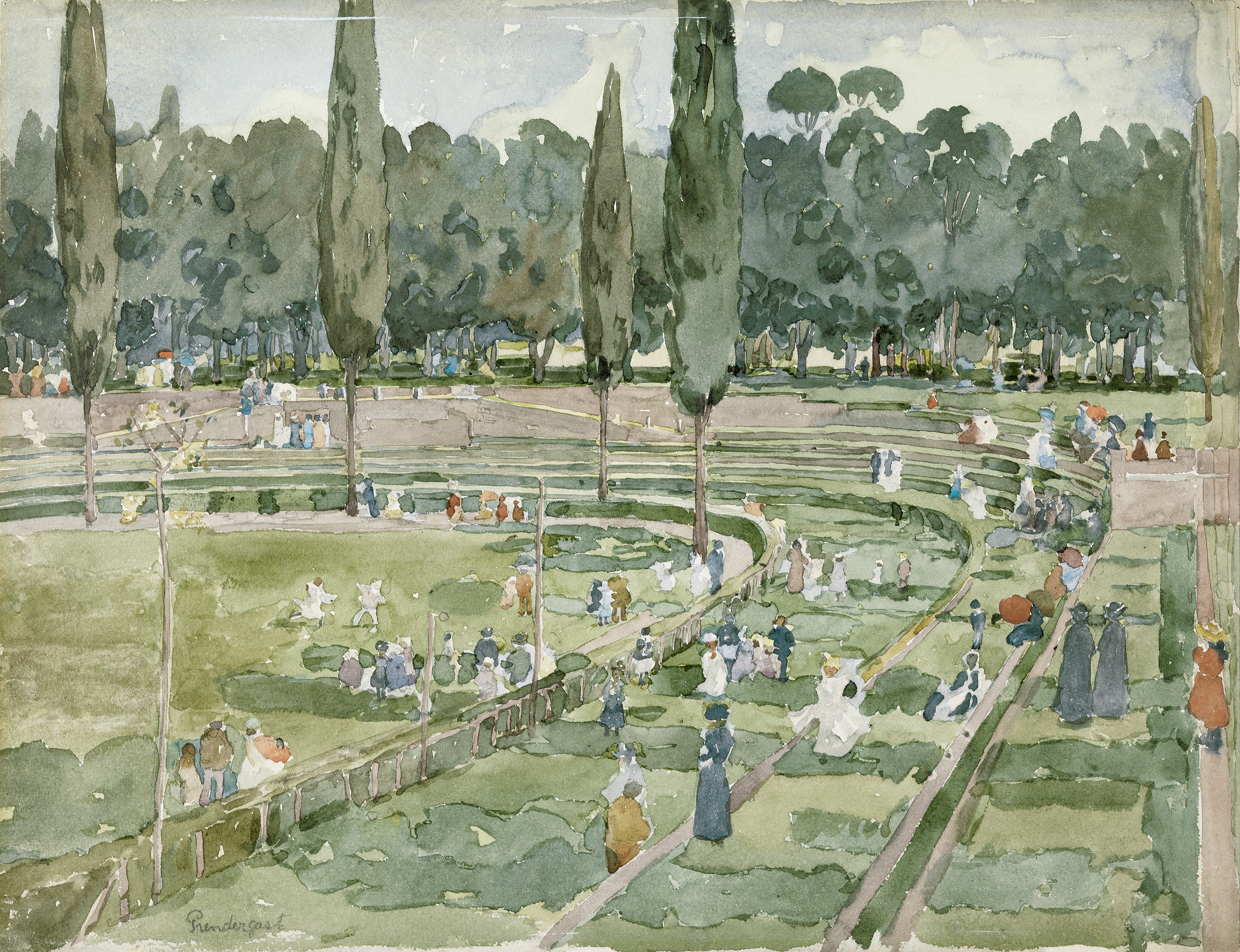
- A picture of Piazza di Siena (1898)
- Host city: Rome
- Venue: Piazza di Siena
- Level: Senior
- Events: 8

The 1907 Italian Athletics Championships were held in Rome. It was the second edition of the Italian Athletics Championships.

== Champions ==
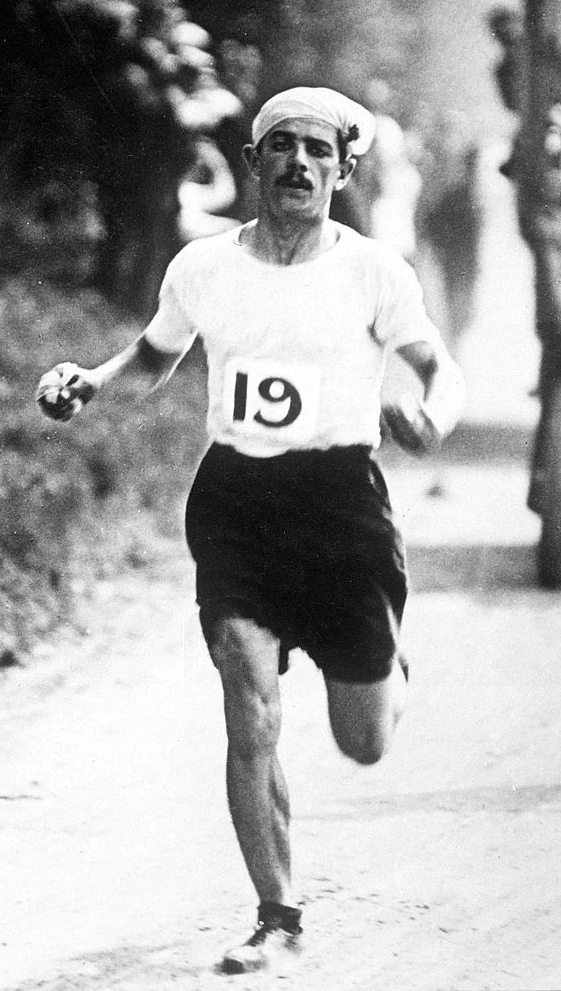
Dorando Pietri won two national title in this edition.

Event	Athlete	Performance
100 m	Umberto Barozzi	11.7
400 m	Umberto Barozzi	54.0
1000 m	Massimo Cartasegna	2:47".00
5000 m	Dorando Pietri	16:27.1/5
Half marathon (20 km road)	Dorando Pietri	1:06'27"
110 m hs	Giovanni Pinzi-Reynaud	21.1/5
1500 m walk	Antonio Pittarello	7:00.1/5
10,000 m walk	Arturo Balestrieri	48:48.0
