= 1956 Italian Athletics Championships =

Edition of the Italian Athletics Championships

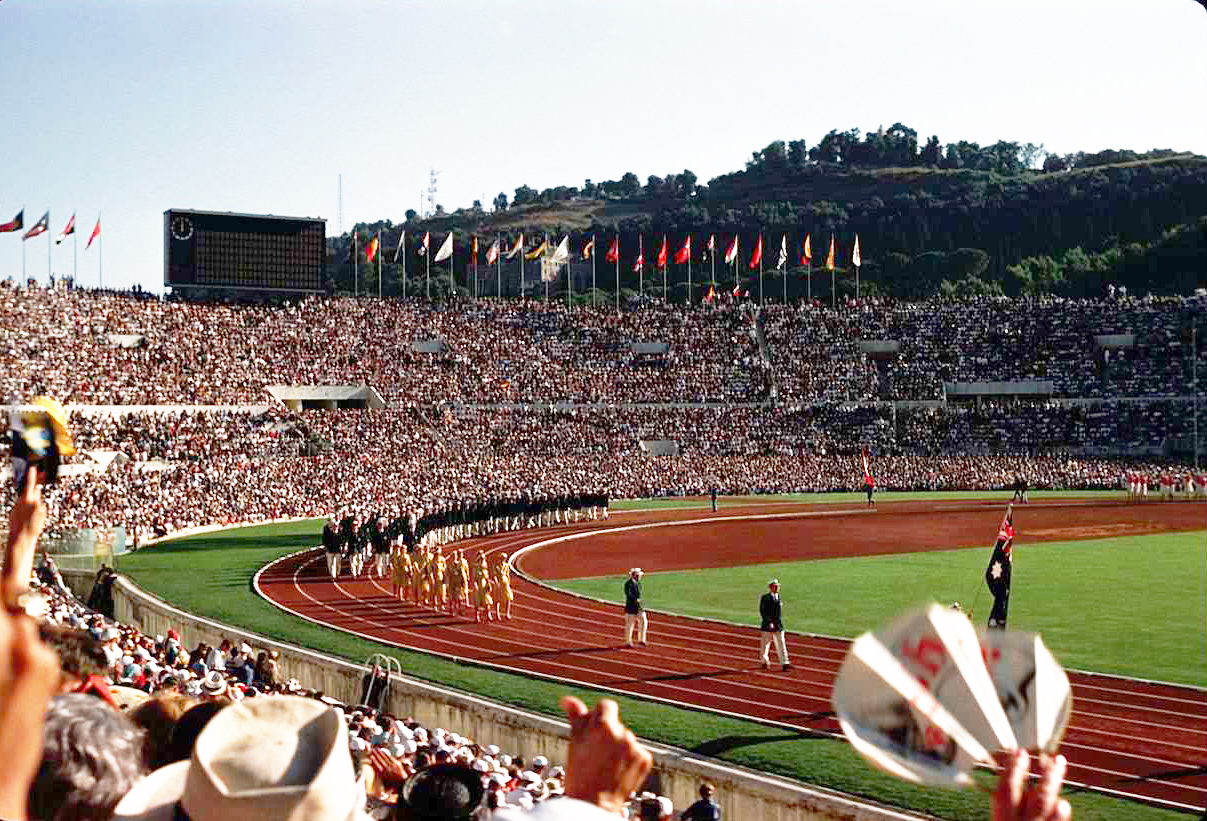
- Olympic Stadium during the Rome 1960 opening day four year after this event
- Dates: 28–30 September
- Host city: Rome
- Venue: Olympic Stadium
- Level: Senior
- Events: 36 (25 men, 11 women)

The 1956 Italian Athletics Championships was the 46th edition of the Italian Athletics Championships and were held in Rome (main event) from 28 to 30 September.

== Champions ==
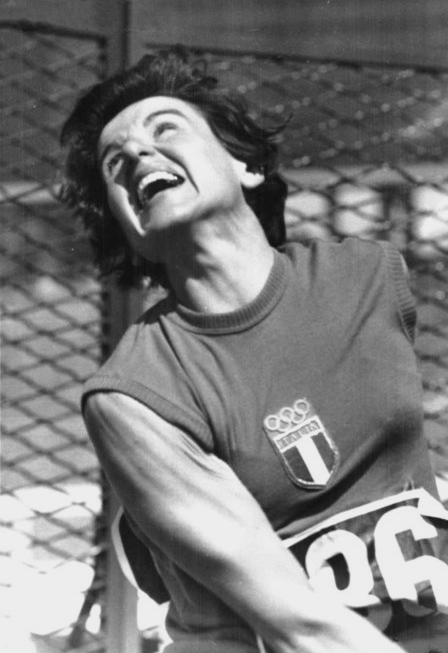
Paola Paternoster three titles, all in the throws, at this edition of championships.

Full results.

Track events
Event	Men	Performance	Women	Performance
100 m	Luigi Gnocchi	10.4	Giusy Leone	11.9
200 m	Luigi Gnocchi	21.4	Giusy Leone	24.3
400 m	Renato Panciera	47.8		
800 m	Gianfranco Baraldi	1:53.7	Vita Virgilio	2:20.0
1500 m	Gianfranco Baraldi	3:53.8		
5000 m	Francesco Perrone	14:36.4		
10,000 m	Franco Volpi	30:37.2		
110/80 m hs	Giampiero Massardi	15.0	Milena Greppi	11.5
400 m hs	Mauro Bettella	52.6		
3000 m st	Vincenzo Leone	9:43.6		
10,000 m walk	Abdon Pamich	45:37:4		
Field events
High jump	Gianmario Roveraro	1.91 m	Osvalda Giardi	1.57 m
Pole vault	Edmondo Ballotta	4.20 m		
Long jump	Attilio Bravi; Valerio Colatore	7.13 m	Piera Fassio	5.42 m
Triple jump	Ennio Evangelio	14.72 m		
Shot put	Silvano Meconi	16.07 m	Paola Paternoster	13.22 m
Discus throw	Adolfo Consolini	53.14 m	Paola Paternoster	44.95 m
Hammer throw	Teseo Taddia	55.09 m		
Javelin throw	Giovanni Lievore	73.76 m	Paola Paternoster	44.48 m
Combined
Decathlon/Pentathlon	Umberto Bordignon	5054 pts	Osvalda Giardi	3569 pts
Road events
Half marathon (20 km)	Rino Lavelli	1:06:30		
Marathon	Rino Lavelli	2:38:15.0		
20 km walk	Pino Dordoni	1:38:41.0		
50 km walk	Abdon Pamich	4:31:06.0		
Cross country
Cross (7 km/1.2 km)	Luigi Conti	25:20.2	Germana Bustreo	4:09.8
