= 1906 Italian Athletics Championships =

- Dates: 21 October
- Host city: Milan
- Venue: Arena Civica
- Level: Senior
- Events: 4

The 1906 Italian Athletics Championships were held in Milan. It was the first edition of the Italian Athletics Championships.

== Results ==
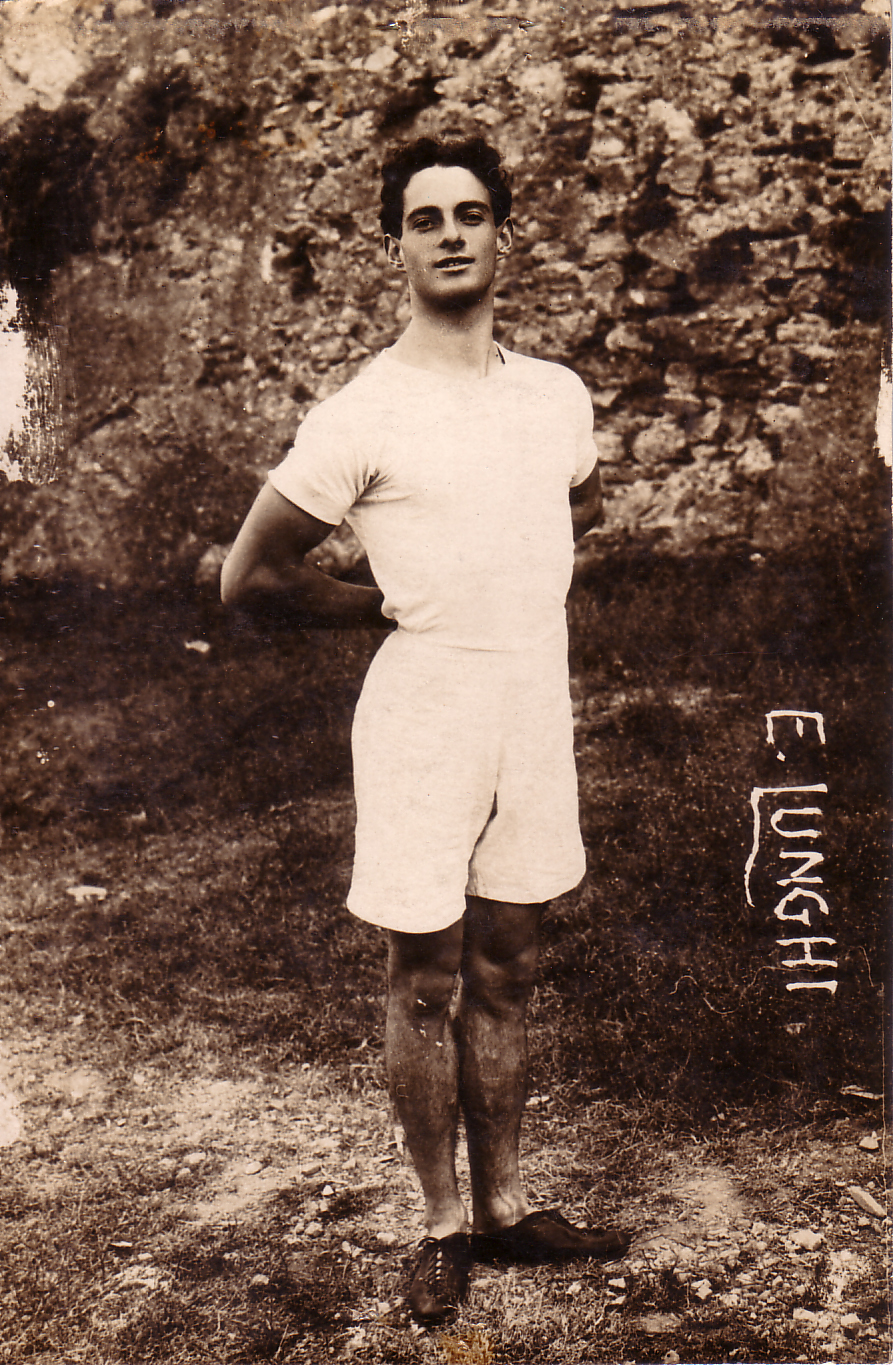
Emilio Lunghi won 1500 m.

Event	Champion		2nd		3rd	
	Athlete	Performance	Athlete	Performance	Athlete	Performance
100 m	Umberto Barozzi	11.3/5	Gaspare Torretta	n/d	Emilio Brambilla	n/d
1500 m	Emilio Lunghi	4:14"1/5	Luigi Bettioli	4:40"3/5	Gerolamo Castiglioni	4:42"2/5
Half marathon (25 km)	Pericle Pagliani	1:33:58"2/5	Aduo Fava	1:34:03"0	Antonio Fraschini	1:43:45"2/5
25 km race walk	Angelo Coccia	2:26:57"3/5	Arturo Balestrieri	2:29:24"1/5	Remo Canali	2:29:52"0
