= 1979 Italian Athletics Championships =

- Dates: 16–18 July
- Host city: Rome
- Level: Senior

The 1979 Italian Athletics Championships was the 69th edition of the Italian Athletics Championships and were held in Rome (track & field events).

== Champions ==
=== Men ===
Event	Athlete	Performance
100 metres	Mauro Zuliani	10.41
200 metres	Pietro Mennea	20.48
400 metres	Stefano Malinverni	47.23
800 metres	Carlo Grippo	1:47.54
1500 metres	Vittorio Fontanella	3:44.9a
5000 metres	Mariano Scartezzini	13:53.9a
10,000 metres	Luigi Zarcone	29:03.0a
110 metres hurdles	Giuseppe Buttari	14.00
400 metres hurdles	Fulvio Zorn	50.69
3000 metres steeplechase	Mariano Scartezzini	8:30.0a
High jump	Massimo Di Giorgio	2.21
Pole vault	Domenico D'Alisera	5.02
Long jump	Maurizio Siega	7.45
Triple jump	Roberto Mazzucato	16.03
Shot put	Angelo Groppelli	19.35
Discus throw	Silvano Simeon	60.66
Hammer throw	Gian Paolo Urlando	72.56
Javelin throw	Vincenzo Marchetti	77.04*
Decathlon	Marco Nebiolo	6741
Half Marathon	Giampaolo Messina	1:35:28*
Marathon	Michelangelo Arena	02:14:44
10,000 metres track walk	Maurizio Damilano	41:39.7a
20 km road walk	Giorgio Damilano	01:28:30
50 km road walk	Domenico Carpentieri	04:10:43
Cross country (long course)	Luigi Zarcone	

=== Women ===
Event	Athlete	Performance
100 metres	Laura Miano	11.62
200 metres	Patrizia Lombardo	24.43
400 metres	Erica Rossi	55.08
800 metres	Agnese Possamai	2:06.6a
1500 metres	Gabriella Dorio	4:12.9a
3000 metres	Margherita Gargano	9:03.7a
100 metres hurdles	Patrizia Lombardo	13.63
400 metres hurdles	Giuseppina Cirulli	59.27
3000 metres steeplechase	-	-
High jump	Sara Simeoni	1.90
Pole vault	-	-
Long jump	Barbara Norello	6.00
Triple jump	-	-
Shot put	Angela Anzelotti	15.33
Discus throw	Maristella Bano	52.32
Hammer throw	-	-
Javelin throw	Fausta Quintavalla	55.08*
Pentathlon	Barbara Bachlechner	4022p
Marathon	-	-
Cross country (long course)	Margherita Gargano	
