= 1969 Italian Athletics Championships =

- Dates: 27–29 June
- Host city: Milan
- Level: Senior

The 1969 Italian Athletics Championships was the 59th edition of the Italian Athletics Championships and were held in Milan (track & field events).

== Champions ==
=== Men ===
| Event | Athlete | Performance |
|---|---|---|
| 100 metres | Pasqualino Abeti | 10.5 |
| 200 metres | Pasqualino Abeti | 21.1 |
| 400 metres | Sergio Bello | 46.4 |
| 800 metres | Francesco Arese | 1:50.6 |
| 1500 metres | Gianni Del Buono | 3:45.8 |
| 5000 metres | Renzo Finelli | 14:17.8 |
| 10,000 metres | Giuseppe Cindolo | 29:46.8 |
| 110 metres hurdles | Eddy Ottoz | 13.9 |
| 400 metres hurdles | Roberto Frinolli | 50.3 |
| 3000 metres steeplechase | Umberto Risi | 8:49.0 |
| High jump | Erminio Azzaro | 2.16 |
| Pole vault | Renato Dionisi | 5.00 |
| Long jump | Carlo Arrighi | 7.54 |
| Triple jump | Rinaldo Camaioni | 15.72 |
| Shot put | Flavio Asta | 18.32 |
| Discus throw | Silvano Simeon | 54.26 |
| Hammer throw | Faustino De Boni | 64.20 |
| Javelin throw | Carlo Lievore | 80.80* |
| Decathlon | Sergio Rossetti | 6789 |
| Half Marathon | Giocchino De Palma | 1:03:34# |
| Marathon | Antonio Ambu | 02:23:09 |
| 10,000 metres track walk | Abdon Pamich | 45:04.2 |
| 20 km road walk | Abdon Pamich | 01:38:33 |
| 50 km road walk | Sante Mancini | 04:14:34 |
| Cross country (long course) | Antonio Ambu | |

=== Women ===
| Event | Athlete | Performance |
|---|---|---|
| 100 metres | Donata Govoni | 11.8 |
| 200 metres | Maria Bruni | 24.8 |
| 400 metres | Donata Govoni | 55.0 |
| 800 metres | Paola Pigni | 2:06.4 |
| 1500 metres | Angela Ramello | 4:46.6 |
| 3000 metres | - | - |
| 100 metres hurdles | Magaly Vettorazzo | 14.2 |
| 400 metres hurdles | - | - |
| 3000 metres steeplechase | - | - |
| High jump | Rosa Bellamoli | 1.68 |
| Pole vault | - | - |
| Long jump | Magaly Vettorazzo | 5.75 |
| Triple jump | - | - |
| Shot put | Silvana Forcellini | 13.94 |
| Discus throw | Maria Luisa Fancello | 44.44 |
| Hammer throw | - | - |
| Javelin throw | Maria Mazzacurati | 43.38* |
| Pentathlon | Magaly Vettorazzo | 4322p |
| Marathon | - | - |
| Cross country (long course) | Paola Pigni | |
