= 1977 Italian Athletics Championships =

- Dates: 26–27 July
- Host city: Rome
- Level: Senior

The 1977 Italian Athletics Championships was the 67th edition of the Italian Athletics Championships and were held in Rome (track & field events).

== Champions ==
=== Men ===
Event	Athlete	Performance
100 metres	Luciano Caravani	10.52
200 metres	Pietro Mennea	20.30
400 metres	Alfonso Di Guida	46.73
800 metres	Gabriele Ferrero	1:49.9a
1500 metres	Giacinto De Cataldo	3:47.8a
5000 metres	Venanzio Ortis	13:53.4a
10,000 metres	Luigi Zarcone	28:02.3a
110 metres hurdles	Sergio Liani	13.86
400 metres hurdles	Lorenzo Brigante	51.38
3000 metres steeplechase	Roberto Volpi	8:44.8a
High jump	Rodolfo Bergamo	2.15
Pole vault	Renato Dionisi	5.00
Long jump	Maurizio Siega	7.63
Triple jump	Roberto Mazzucato	16.35
Shot put	Marco Montelatici	19.01
Discus throw	Silvano Simeon	60.04
Hammer throw	Gian Paolo Urlando	70.56
Javelin throw	Renzo Cramerotti	73.80*
Decathlon	Gianni Modena	7290
Half Marathon	Paolo Accaputo	1:37:00*
Marathon	Paolo Accaputo	02:19:17
10,000 metres track walk	-	-
20 km road walk	Roberto Buccione	1:26:37.5t
50 km road walk	Franco Vecchio	04:07:38
Cross country (long course)	Franco Fava	

=== Women ===
Event	Athlete	Performance
100 metres	Rita Bottiglieri	11.66
200 metres	Rita Bottiglieri	23.62
400 metres	Erica Rossi	54.12
800 metres	Alma Pescalli	2:06.5a
1500 metres	Gabriella Dorio	4:21.9a
3000 metres	Cristina Tomasini	9:12.3a
100 metres hurdles	Ileana Ongar	13.79
400 metres hurdles	Giuseppina Cirulli	60.11
3000 metres steeplechase	-	-
High jump	Sara Simeoni	1.90
Pole vault	-	-
Long jump	Graziella Clemente	6.11
Triple jump	-	-
Shot put	Cinzia Petrucci	16.04
Discus throw	Maura Zambon	52.24
Hammer throw	-	-
Javelin throw	Giuliana Amici	54.40*
Pentathlon	Anna Aldrighetti	3948p
Marathon	-	-
Cross country (long course)	Cristina Tomasini	
