= 1968 Italian Athletics Championships =

- Dates: 5–7 July
- Host city: Trieste
- Level: Senior

The 1968 Italian Athletics Championships was the 58th edition of the Italian Athletics Championships and were held in Trieste (track & field events).

== Champions ==
=== Men ===
Event	Athlete	Performance
100 metres	Ennio Preatoni	10.4
200 metres	Livio Berruti	20.7
400 metres	Sergio Bello	46.9
800 metres	Francesco Arese	1:50.2
1500 metres	Francesco Arese	3:43.0
5000 metres	Giuseppe Ardizzone	14:19.2
10,000 metres	Antonio Ambu	30:05.2
110 metres hurdles	Eddy Ottoz	13.9
400 metres hurdles	Roberto Frinolli	49.8
3000 metres steeplechase	Brunello Bertolin	8:53.6
High jump	Gian Marco Schivo	2.09
Pole vault	Renato Dionisi	5.00
Long jump	Giuseppe Gentile	7.39
Triple jump	Giuseppe Gentile	16.52
Shot put	Silvano Meconi	17.25
Discus throw	Gilberto Ferrini	52.24
Hammer throw	Walter Bernardini	61.22
Javelin throw	Vanni Rodeghiero	73.34*
Decathlon	Sergio Rossetti	6559
Half Marathon	Antonio Ambu	59:52#
Marathon	Antonio Ambu	02:23:18
10,000 metres track walk	Abdon Pamich	45:22.2
20 km road walk	Abdon Pamich	01:40:00
50 km road walk	Abdon Pamich	04:15:47
Cross country (long course)	Antonio Ambu	

=== Women ===
Event	Athlete	Performance
100 metres	Cecilia Molinari	11.8
200 metres	Michela Poggipollini	24.0
400 metres	Donata Govoni	53.9
800 metres	Paola Pigni	2:08.2
1500 metres	-	-
3000 metres	-	-
100 metres hurdles	Carla Panerai	11.1*
400 metres hurdles	-	-
3000 metres steeplechase	-	-
High jump	Annalisa Lanci	1.58
Pole vault	-	-
Long jump	Maria Vittoria Trio	6.48
Triple jump	-	-
Shot put	Silvana Forcellini	13.44
Discus throw	Roberta Grottini	45.08
Hammer throw	-	-
Javelin throw	Maria Mazzacurati	43.18*
Pentathlon	Loredana Fiori	3870p
Marathon	-	-
Cross country (long course)	Paola Pigni	
