= 1975 Italian Athletics Championships =

- Dates: 22–24 July
- Host city: Florence
- Level: Senior

The 1975 Italian Athletics Championships was the 65th edition of the Italian Athletics Championships and were held in Florence (track & field events).

== Champions ==
=== Men ===
Event	Athlete	Performance
100 metres	Pasqualino Abeti	10.6
200 metres	Pasqualino Abeti	21.0
400 metres	Flavio Borghi	47.1
800 metres	Bruno Magnani	1:49.9
1500 metres	Vittorio Fontanella	3:49.6
5000 metres	Giuseppe Cindolo	13:48.4
10,000 metres	Giuseppe Cindolo	28:51.6
110 metres hurdles	Giuseppe Buttari	13.8
400 metres hurdles	Giorgio Ballati	51.1
3000 metres steeplechase	Franco Fava	8:28.4
High jump	Enzo Del Forno	2.20
Pole vault	Silvio Fraquelli	5.20
Long jump	Domenico Fontanella	7.70
Triple jump	Ruggero Consorte	15.80
Shot put	Angelo Groppelli	19.08
Discus throw	Armando De Vincentis	62.84
Hammer throw	Gian Paolo Urlando	67.64
Javelin throw	Renzo Cramerotti	76.88*
Decathlon	Gianni Modena	7325
Half Marathon	Paolo Accaputo	1:39:07*
Marathon	Giuseppe Cindolo	02:18:12
10,000 metres track walk	-	-
20 km road walk	Armando Zambaldo	01:28:49
50 km road walk	Vittorio Visini	04:07:43
Cross country (long course)	Franco Fava	

=== Women ===
Event	Athlete	Performance
100 metres	Rita Bottiglieri	11.5
200 metres	Rita Bottiglieri	23.6
400 metres	Donata Govoni	55.2
800 metres	Gabriella Dorio	2:05.5
1500 metres	Paola Pigni-Cacchi	4:11.2
3000 metres	Silvana Cruciata	9:22.8
100 metres hurdles	Ileana Ongar	13.5
400 metres hurdles	-	-
3000 metres steeplechase	-	-
High jump	Sara Simeoni	1.87
Pole vault	-	-
Long jump	Laura Santini	5.89
Triple jump	-	-
Shot put	Cinzia Petrucci	16.24
Discus throw	Renata Scaglia	50.56
Hammer throw	-	-
Javelin throw	Giuliana Amici	48.04*
Pentathlon	Loredana Fiori	3748p
Marathon	-	-
Cross country (long course)	Margherita Gargano	
