= 1954 Italian Athletics Championships =

Edition of the Italian Athletics Championships

- Dates: 1–3 October (9–10 October Rome's events)
- Host city: Florence (women events); Padua (men events); Rome (women's 200m & pentathlon)
- Level: Senior
- Events: 30 (20 men, 10 women)

The 1954 Italian Athletics Championships was the 44th edition of the Italian Athletics Championships and were held in Florence, Padua and Rome from 1 to 10 October.

== Champions ==
Track events
Event	Men	Performance	Women	Performance
100 m	Luigi Gnocchi	10.7	Giusy Leone	12.0
200 m	Volfango Montanari	21.7	Giusy Leone	25.2
400 m	Vincenzo Lombardo	48.6		
800 m	Alvaro Lensi	1:55.4	Loredana Simonetti	2:21.6
1500 m	Vittorio Maggioni	3:59.4		
5000 m	Giacomo Peppicelli	15:07.2		
10,000 m	Giovan Battista Martini	31:41.2		
110/80 m hs	Ezio Nardelli	15.4	Milena Greppi	11.8
400 m hs	Armando Filiput	53.3		
3000 m st	Vittorio Maggioni	9:32.0		
Racewalk
10,000 m walk	Pino Dordoni	47:26:3		
Field events
High jump	Gianmario Roveraro	1.90 m	Osvalda Giardi	1.50 m
Pole vault	Edmondo Ballotta	4.28 m NR		
Long jump	Attilio Bravi	7.27 m	Osvalda Giardi	5.39 m
Triple jump	Stefano Bonsignore	14.30 m		
Shot put	Angiolo Profeti	14.62 m	Amelia Piccinini	12.51 m
Discus throw	Adolfo Consolini	51.32 m	Gianna Nannetti	37.70 m
Hammer throw	Teseo Taddia	54.58 m		
Javelin throw	Francesco Ziggiotti	66.61 m	Ada Turci	41.85 m
Combined
Decathlon/Pentathlon	Lorenzo Vecchiutti	5247 pts	Paola Paternoster	4073 pts
