= Athletics at the 1959 Summer Universiade – Women's discus throw =

The women's discus throw event at the 1959 Summer Universiade was held at the Stadio Comunale di Torino in Turin on 4 September 1959.

== Results ==
Rank	Name	Nationality	Result	Notes
1st place, gold medalist(s)	Györgyi Hegedus	Hungary	46.76	
2nd place, silver medalist(s)	Elivia Ricci	Italy	45.56	
3rd place, bronze medalist(s)	Ida Bucsányi	Hungary	43.38	
4	Ursula Nagel	West Germany	42.31	
5	Eva-Maria Hatheysen	West Germany	35.38	
