= 1982 Italian Athletics Championships =

- Dates: 20–21 July
- Host city: Rome
- Level: Senior

The 1982 Italian Athletics Championships was the 72nd edition of the Italian Athletics Championships and were held in Rome (track & field events).

== Champions ==
=== Men ===
Event	Athlete	Performance
100 metres	Pierfrancesco Pavoni	10.39
200 metres	Carlo Simionato	20.84
400 metres	Mauro Zuliani	46.23
800 metres	Gabriele Ferrero	1:52.14
1500 metres	Claudio Patrignani	3:39.30
5000 metres	Alberto Cova	13:46.64
10,000 metres	Alberto Cova	29:08.60
110 metres hurdles	Daniele Fontecchio	13.97
400 metres hurdles	Saverio Gellini	50.35
3000 metres steeplechase	Luciano Carchesio	8:35.83
High jump	Massimo Di Giorgio	2.26
Pole vault	Mauro Barella	5.20
Long jump	Giovanni Evangelisti	7.76
Triple jump	Roberto Mazzucato	16.18
Shot put	Marco Montelatici	20.06
Discus throw	Marco Bucci	61.32
Hammer throw	Gian Paolo Urlando	76.68
Javelin throw	Agostino Ghesini	79.22*
Decathlon	Antonio Iacocca	7348
Half Marathon	Giovanni Rastello	1:33:48*
Marathon	Giuseppe Gerbi	02:11:25
10,000 metres track walk	Maurizio Damilano	41:33.97
20 km road walk	Maurizio Damilano	01:22:06
50 km road walk	Graziano Morotti	04:08:43
Cross country (long course)	Alberto Cova	
Cross country (short course)	not held	
Mountain running	Claudio Galeazzi	

=== Women ===
Event	Athlete	Performance
100 metres	Marisa Masullo	11.53
200 metres	Marisa Masullo	23.88
400 metres	Erica Rossi	53.11
800 metres	Gabriella Dorio	2:00.35
1500 metres	Gabriella Dorio	4:13.54
3000 metres	Agnese Possamai	8:57.09
5000 metres	-	-
10,000 metres	-	-
100 metres hurdles	Laura Rosati	13.95
400 metres hurdles	Giuseppina Cirulli	57.63
3000 metres steeplechase	-	-
High jump	Sara Simeoni	1.85
Pole vault	-	-
Long jump	Sandra Oldani	5.95
Triple jump	-	-
Shot put	Concetta Milanese	15.07
Discus throw	Maristella Bano	55.70
Hammer throw	-	-
Javelin throw	Fausta Quintavalla	60.06*
Heptathlon	Alessandra Becatti	5316
Half Marathon	Laura Fogli	1:12:44*
Marathon	Alba Milana	02:41:46
5000 Metres Track Walk	Giuliana Salce	26:56.65
20 Kilometres Road Walk	-	-
Cross country (long course)	Agnese Possamai	
Cross country (short course)	-	
Mountain running	Maria Canins	
