= A Man Named John =

1965 film

- Directed by: Ermanno Olmi
- Written by: Pope John XXIII; Ermanno Olmi; Vincenzo Labella
- Produced by: Vincenzo Labella; Harry Saltzman
- Starring: Rod Steiger
- Cinematography: Piero Portalupi
- Edited by: Carla Colombo
- Release date: 1965
- Running time: 90 minutes
- Country: Italy
- Language: Italian

A Man Named John (Italian: E venne un uomo) is a 1965 drama film directed by Ermanno Olmi and starring Rod Steiger.

== Plot ==
The film is a biography of Pope John XXIII, who, however, does not appear in the film as an actual character. Instead Rod Steiger acts as an "intermediary", telling the Pope's life story while traveling through the places in Bergamo where he grew up.

== Cast ==
- Rod Steiger - The Intermediary
- Adolfo Celi - Msgr. Radini Tedeschi
- Giorgo Fortunato - Secretary of Nunzio Roncalli
- Ottone Candiani - The Sinful Priest of Venice
- Alfonso Orlando - Parish priest
- Alberto Rossi - Angelo Roncalli - Age 7
- Giovanni Rossi - Angelo Roncalli - Age 10 (as Giovannio Rossi)
- Fabrisio Rossi - Angelo Roncalli - Age 4
- Pietro Germi - Pontiff's Father
- Rita Bertocchi - Pontiff's Mother
- Antonio Bertocchi - Uncle Xavier
- Antonio Ruttigni - Don Pietro, parish priest of Carviso
- Romolo Valli - The Intermediary (voice)

== Critical reception ==
Stanley Kauffmann of The New Republic described A Man Named John as a 'mistake'.
