= 2024 Italian Athletics Championships =

Edition of the Italian Athletics Championships

- Dates: 29–30 June (main event)
- Host city: La Spezia (track & field)
- Level: Senior
- Events: 38 (track & field)

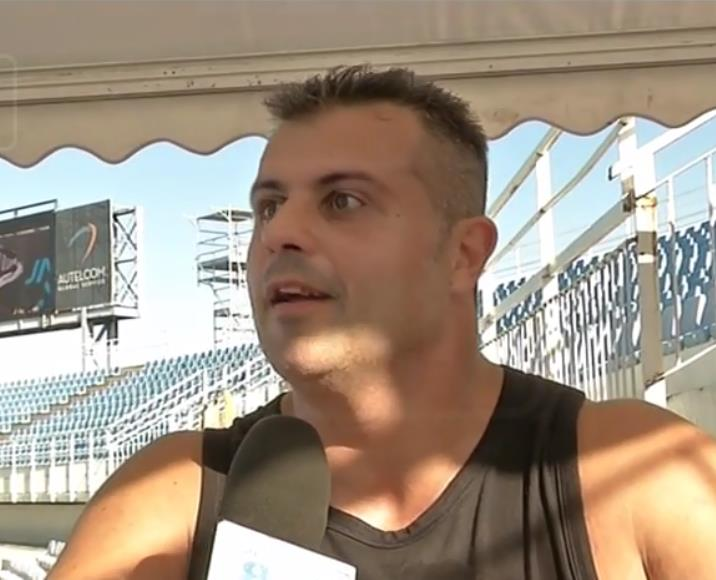
Marco Lingua won his 18th national title at 46.

The 2024 Italian Athletics Championships will be the 114th edition of the Italian Athletics Championships and take place in La Spezia from 29 to 30 June.

== Champions ==
Track events
Event	Men	Performance	Women	Performance
100 m	Matteo Melluzzo	10.12 PB	Zaynab Dosso	11.20 CR
200 m	Fausto Desalu	20.28	Anna Bongiorni	23.10
400 m	Edoardo Scotti	45.28	Alice Mangione	51.57
800 m	Simone Barontini	1:45.84	Eloisa Coiro	2:03.71
1500 m	Federico Riva	3:40.63	Federica Del Buono	4:05.14
5000 m	Pietro Arese	13:35.97	Nadia Battocletti	15:24.69
110/100 m hs	Lorenzo Simonelli	13.18 CR	Giada Carmassi	12.87 PB CR
400 m hs	Giacomo Bertoncelli	49.80	Alice Muraro	55.13
3000 m st	Yassin Bouih	8:21.00	Eleonora Curtabbi	9:57.59
Road events
10 km walk (road)	Andrea Agrusti	39.55	Valentina Trapletti	43.54 PB
Field events
High jump	Stefano Sottile	2.30 m	Idea Pieroni	1.88 m
Pole vault	Federico Biancoli	5.10 m	Roberta Bruni	5.45 m
Long jump	Kareem Mersal	7.89 m	Elisa Naldi	6.21 m
Triple jump	Andrea Dallavalle	17,77 m	Dariya Derkach	14.19 m
Shot put	Leonardo Fabbri	22.11 m CR	Sara Verteramo	15.98 m
Discus throw	Alessio Mannucci	64.07 m	Emily Conte	56.82 m
Hammer throw	Marco Lingua	69.66 m	Sara Fantini	71.32 m
Javelin throw	Giovanni Frattini	75.40 m	Emanuela Casadei	56.49 m PB
Combined
Decathlon/Heptathlon	Lorenzo Modugno	7567 pts	Sara Chiaratti	5587 pts

Result day 1 Result day 2

== See also ==
- 2024 Italian Athletics Indoor Championships
- Athletics in Italy
