= Fernando Altimani =

Italian racewalker (1893–1963)

Personal information
- Nickname: Nando
- Nationality: Italian
- Born: 8 December 1893 Milan, Italy
- Died: 1 January 1963 (aged 69) Milan, Italy
- Height: 1.77 m (5 ft 9 1/2 in)
- Weight: 70 kg (154 lb)

Sport
- Country: Italy
- Sport: Athletics
- Event: Race walk
- Club: US Milanese

Achievements and titles
- Personal best: 10km walk: 44:34.4 (1913)
Medal record
Olympic Games
Bronze medal – third place	1912 Stockholm	10 kilometre walk

Fernando "Nando" Altimani (8 December 1893 – 1 January 1963) was an Italian athlete who competed mainly in the 10 kilometre walk.

== Biography ==
He competed for Italy in the 1912 Summer Olympics held in Stockholm, Sweden in the 10 kilometre walk where he won the bronze medal.

== National titles ==
Fernando Altimani has won 9 times the individual national championship.

- 5 wins in 1500 m race walk (1910, 1911, 1912, 1913, 1914)
- 4 wins in 10000 m race walk (1910, 1911, 1912, 1913)
