= Alfonso Orlando =

Italian long-distance runner

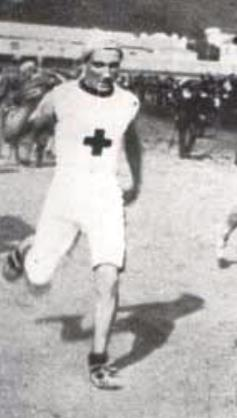
- Orlando in 1909.

Personal information
- National team: Italy: 1 cap (1912)
- Born: 17 May 1892 Nocera Inferiore, Italy
- Died: 29 August 1969 (aged 77) Bergamo, Italy
- Height: 1.63 m (5 ft 4 in)
- Weight: 62 kg (137 lb)

Sport
- Sport: Athletics
- Event: Long-distance running
- Club: Atalanta Bergamo

Achievements and titles
- Personal bests: 3000 m: 9:24.4 (1912); 5000 m: 15:46.8 (1912); 10000 m: 32:57.2 (1912)

Alfonso Orlando (17 May 1892 - 29 August 1969) was an Italian long-distance runner and actor. He competed at the 1912 Summer Olympics and acted in the movie A Man Named John (1963).

== National records ==
- 3000 metres: 9:24.4 (Milan, 20 June 1912) - record holder until 8 July 1913.
- 5000 metres: 9:24.4 (Milan, 20 June 1912) - record holder until 8 July 1913.
- 10,000 metres: 32:57.2 (Milan, 12 May 1912) - record holder until 26 September 1914.

== National titles ==
Orlando won two national championships at individual senior level.

- Italian Athletics Championships
  - 5000 metres: 1911, 1912 (2)

== See also ==
- Italy at the 1912 Summer Olympics
