= Daciano Colbachini =

Italian hurdler (1893–1982)

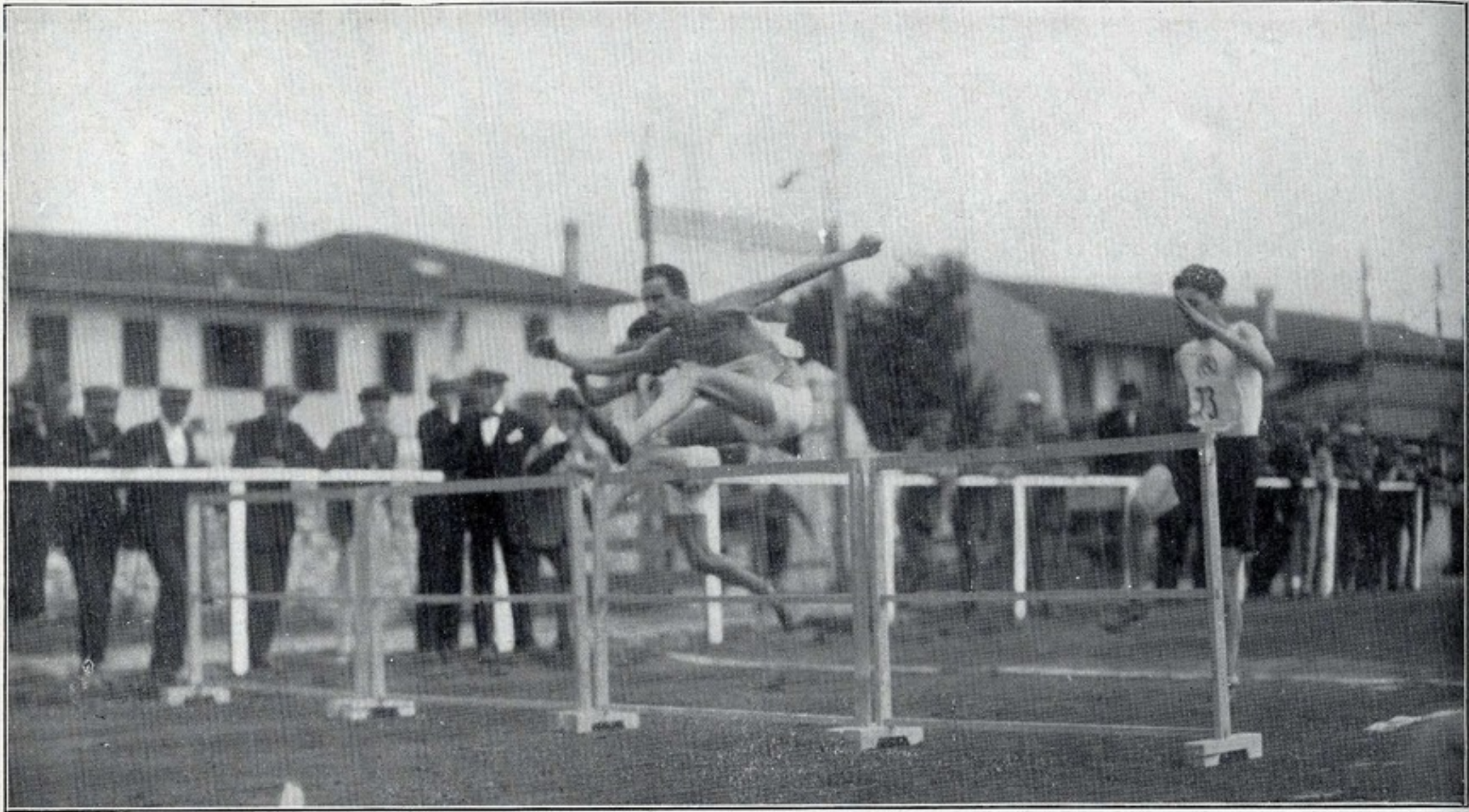

Personal information
- Nationality: Italian
- Born: 31 October 1893 Padua, Italy
- Died: 13 April 1982 (aged 88) Padua, Italy

Sport
- Country: Italy
- Sport: Athletics
- Event: 110 metres hurdles

Daciano Colbachini (31 October 1893 – 13 April 1982) was an Italian hurdler who competed in the 1912 Summer Olympics and in the 1920 Summer Olympics. He was born in Padua.
