= Umberto Blasi =

Italian long-distance runner

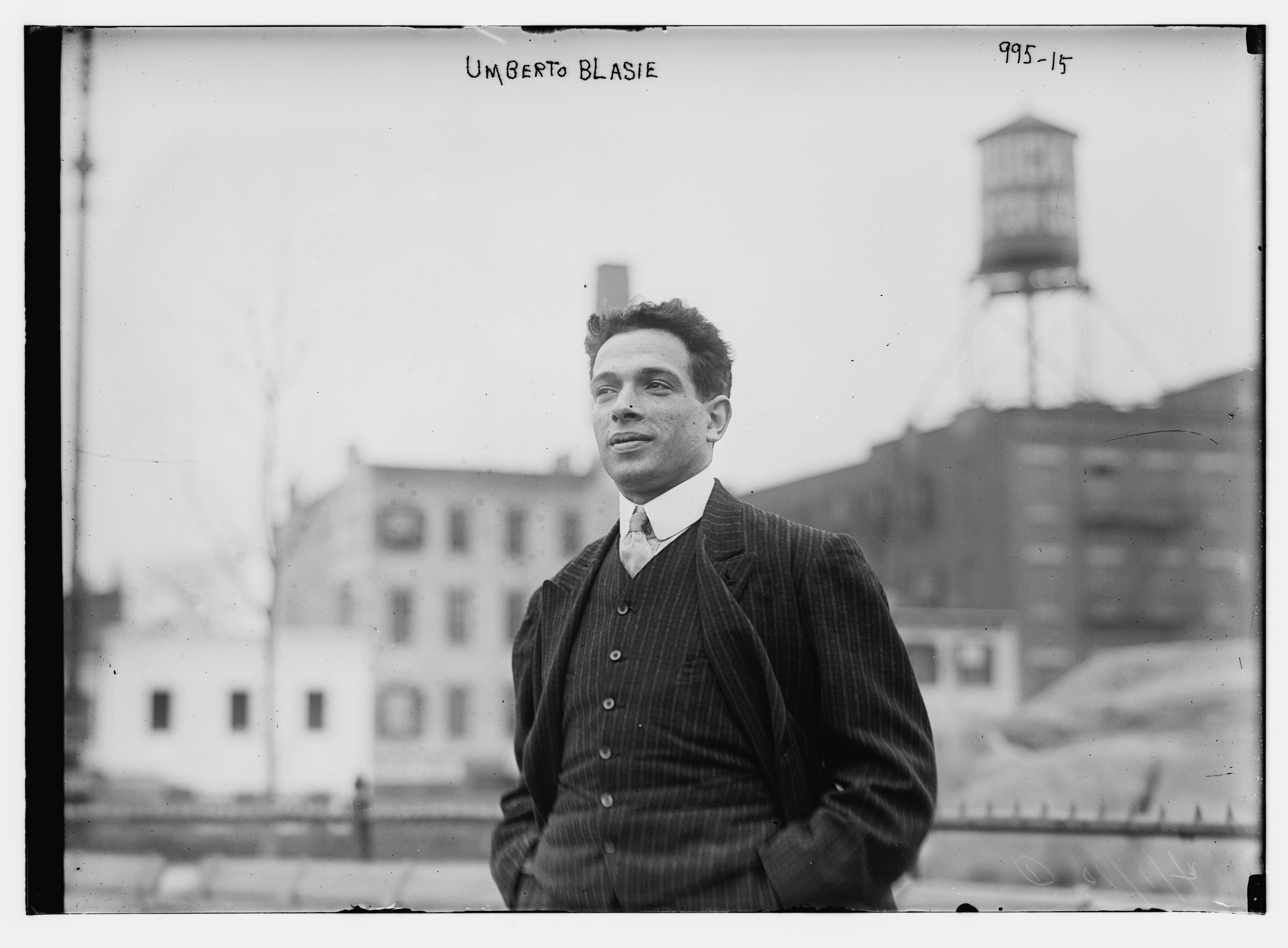

Personal information
- Born: 12 October 1886 Rome, Italy
- Died: 1 July 1938 (aged 51) Rome, Italy

Sport
- Sport: Athletics
- Event: Long-distance running

Achievements and titles
- Personal best: Marathon: 2:38:01 (1914)

Umberto Blasi (12 October 1886 - 1 July 1938) (Note: www.sports-reference.com notes date of death as 11 July 1938.) was an Italian long-distance runner who was a three-time national champion in the marathon and competed in the men's marathon at the 1908 Summer Olympics.

== Biography ==
On 3 June 1908, Blasi won Italy's first national marathon championship in Rome in a time of 3:01:04. Given that the race also served as the nation's Olympic trial for that year's Games, he earned a spot on the Italian Olympic team with Augusto Cocca and Dorando Pietri. The following month in London, Blasi was one of 56 who lined-up to start the marathon on a warm and muggy afternoon. He dropped out after 8 miles and did not finish. Blasi later won his second consecutive national championship with a 2:38:30 on a 40 kilometer course in Milan on 19 September 1909. One week later, on an official distance course in Voltri, Italy, his 2:48:44 mark lowered the Italian marathon record set three months earlier by Arturo deMaria.

On 2 April 1910 Blasi was one of ten professional competitors in a marathon with 16,000 spectators at the Polo Grounds in New York City. Dropping out after 18 miles, he was reportedly "carried to his dressing room". Supporters of Blasi and another Italian runner, Fortunio Zantis, forced an early end to another marathon in Rocky Point, Rhode Island, on 10 July 1910, by crowding the track and attempting to trip the leader, Patrick Dineen of Boston. Dinnen, who completed 21 laps, was declared the winner while Blasi finished in fifth. Three weeks later at the Rocky Point baseball grounds, 3,500 spectators witnessed Blasi compete with five other runners in a 20-mile race that was subsequently believed to have been "considerably less than 18 miles". He was reported to have led Zantis at the half-mile post by 45 yards and crossed the mile mark first in 4:36 before fading to a fourth-place finish.

Blasi eventually ran his marathon personal best with a 2:38:00.8 performance to capture his third and final national title in Legnano, Italy, on 29 November 1914. Although not recognized as a world best by the International Association of Athletics Federations, the Association of Road Racing Statisticians lists this mark in their progression of world records in the marathon as well as the world's fastest for 1914.

Blasi was born in Rome, Italy.
