= Pericle Pagliani =

Italian middle- and long-distance runner

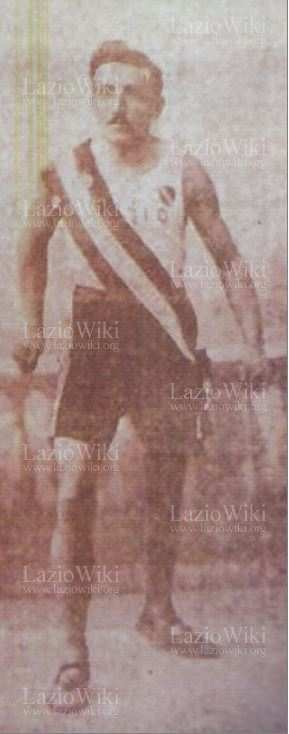

Personal information
- Nationality: Italian
- Born: Luigi Pagliani; 2 February 1883 Magliano Sabina
- Died: 4 October 1932 (aged 49) Rome, Kingdom of Italy

Sport
- Country: Italy
- Sport: Athletics
- Events: Long-distance running Marathon
- Club: Società Podistica Lazio

Pericle Pagliani (2 February 1883 - 4 October 1932) was an Italian long-distance runner who competed in the men's 5 miles and men's 3 miles team race at the 1908 Summer Olympics.

== Biography ==
He was the most famous Italian podist in the early twentieth century, the idol of the youngest Dorando Pietri, who decided to seriously engage in racing competitions when he battled him in a racing competition that took place in 1904 in his Carpi hometown.

== Achievements ==
Year	Competition	Venue	Position	Event	Time	Notes
1906	Intercalated Games	(Greece) Athens	Round One	1500 metres	DNF	
1906	Intercalated Games	(Greece) Athens	5th	5 miles	Unknown	
1906	Intercalated Games	(Greece) Athens	Final	3 miles team race	Unknown	
1908	Olympic Games	(United Kingdom) London	Round One	5 miles	26:56.4	
1908	Olympic Games	(United Kingdom) London	Round One	3 miles team race	15:22.6	

== National titles ==
He won five national championships at individual senior level.

- Italian Athletics Championships
  - 5000 metres: 1908
  - Half marathon: 1906, 1910
  - Cross country: 1908, 1909
