= Umberto Barozzi =

Italian sprinter

Personal information
- Nationality: Italian
- Born: 13 August 1881 Ivrea, Italy
- Died: 13 July 1929 (aged 47) Novara, Italy
- Height: 1.81 m (5 ft 11 1/2 in)
- Weight: 70 kg (154 lb)

Sport
- Country: Italy
- Sport: Athletics
- Event: Sprint
- Club: Ginnastica e Scherma Novara

Achievements and titles
- Personal bests: 100 m: 11.0 (1906); 200 m: 23.2 (1908)

Umberto Barozzi (Ivrea, 13 August 1881 - 13 July 1929) was an Italian sprinter. Umberto Barozzi participated at one edition of the Summer Olympics (1908) and he won the first edition of the Italian Athletics Championships on 100 metres, in 1906.

== Achievements ==
| Year | Competition | Venue | Position | Event | Performance | Note |
|---|---|---|---|---|---|---|
| 1908 | Olympic Games | (United Kingdom) London | heat | 100 metres | - | |
| 1908 | Olympic Games | (United Kingdom) London | heat | 200 metres | 24.1 | |

== National titles ==
Umberto Barozzi has won four time the individual national championship.

- 3 wins on 100 metres (1906, 1907, 1908)
- 1 win on 400 metres (1907)

== See also ==
- 100 metres winners of Italian Athletics Championships
