= Attilio Bravi =

Italian long jumper

Personal information
- Nationality: Italian
- Born: 9 September 1936 Bra, Piedmont, Italy
- Died: 27 November 2013 (aged 77) Bra, Piedmont, Italy
- Height: 1.84 m (6 ft 1/2 in)
- Weight: 75 kg (165 lb)

Sport
- Country: Italy
- Sport: Athletics
- Event: Long jump
- Club: G.S. Fiamme Oro

Achievements and titles
- Personal best: Long jump: 7.66 m (1958)
Medal record
Universiade
Gold medal – first place	1959 Turin	Long jump

Attilio Bravi (9 September 1936 – 27 November 2013) was an Italian long jumper.

== Biography ==
Born in Bra, Piedmont, Bravi competed in the 1960 Summer Olympics, Rome and had 16 caps in the national team from 1954 to 1960.

Bravi died on 27 November 2013, aged 77, in his hometown of Bra, Piedmont.

== Olympic results ==
Year	Competition	Venue	Position	Event	Performance	Note
1960	Olympic Games	(Italy) Rome	10th	Long jump	7.47 m	

== National titles ==
Attilio Bravi has won 8 times the individual national championship.

- 8 wins in long jump (1952, 1954, 1955, 1956, 1957, 1958, 1959, 1960)
