= Massimo Cartasegna =

Italian athlete (1885–1963)

Massimo Cartasegna (30 June 1885 – 15 April 1963) was an Italian athlete who competed at the 1908 Summer Olympics in London.

== Biography ==
He was born in Turin. The first event was the 1500 metres, in which Cartasegna did not finish his first round semifinal heat and did not advance to the final. In the 400 metres event, Cartasegna placed second in his preliminary heat with a time of 52.7 seconds, behind Louis Sebert's 50.2 seconds and did not advance to the semifinals. In the 3200 metre steeplechase competition he was eliminated in the first round. He was also a member of the Italian team which was eliminated in the first round of the 3 mile team race.

== National titles ==
He won 5 national championships.

- Italian Athletics Championships
  - 1000 metres: 1907, 1909
  - 1200 metres steeplechase: 1908, 1909, 1911

== Sources ==
- Cook, Theodore Andrea (1908). The Fourth Olympiad, Being the Official Report. London: British Olympic Association.
- De Wael, Herman (2001). "Athletics 1908". Herman's Full Olympians. Archived from the original on 27 September 2006.
- Wudarski, Pawel (1999). "Wyniki Igrzysk Olimpijskich" (in Polish).
