= Magalì Vettorazzo =

Italian pentathlete

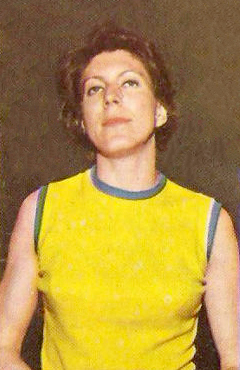

Personal information
- Full name: Maria Vettorazzo
- Born: 16 March 1942 Preganziol, Italy
- Died: 19 June 2018 (aged 76) Florence, Italy
- Height: 1.78 m (5 ft 10 in)
- Weight: 63 kg (139 lb)

Sport
- Sport: Athletics
- Event: Women's pentathlon
- Club: Snia Libertas Torino

Achievements and titles
- Personal best: 4657 (1968)
Medal record
Representing Italy
Mediterranean Games
Bronze medal – third place	1967 Tunis	100 m hs

Maria "Magalì" Vettorazzo (16 March 1942 – 19 June 2018) was an Italian female pentathlete who won a bronze medal at the 1967 Mediterranean Games in 100 metres hurdles.

== Biography ==
Vettorazzo earned 32 caps, from 1960 to 1971, with the Italy national athletics team and she was the first Italian woman to jump over 6 metres in long jump. She competed at the 1968 Olympics and finished in 21st place. She also participated at three editions of the European Athletics Championships. She won 18 national championships at the individual senior level.

- Italian Athletics Championships
  - 80 metres hurdles: 1965, 1966, 1967 (3)
  - 100 metres hurdles: 1969 (1)
  - Long jump: 1961, 1962, 1963, 1964, 1966, 1967, 1969 (7)
  - Pentathlon: 1962, 1963, 1965, 1966, 1967, 1969, 1970 (7)

== See also ==
- Italian record progression women's long jump
- Italian Athletics Championships – Multi winners
