= Elivia Ricci =

Italian athlete

Elivia Ricci married name Ballotta
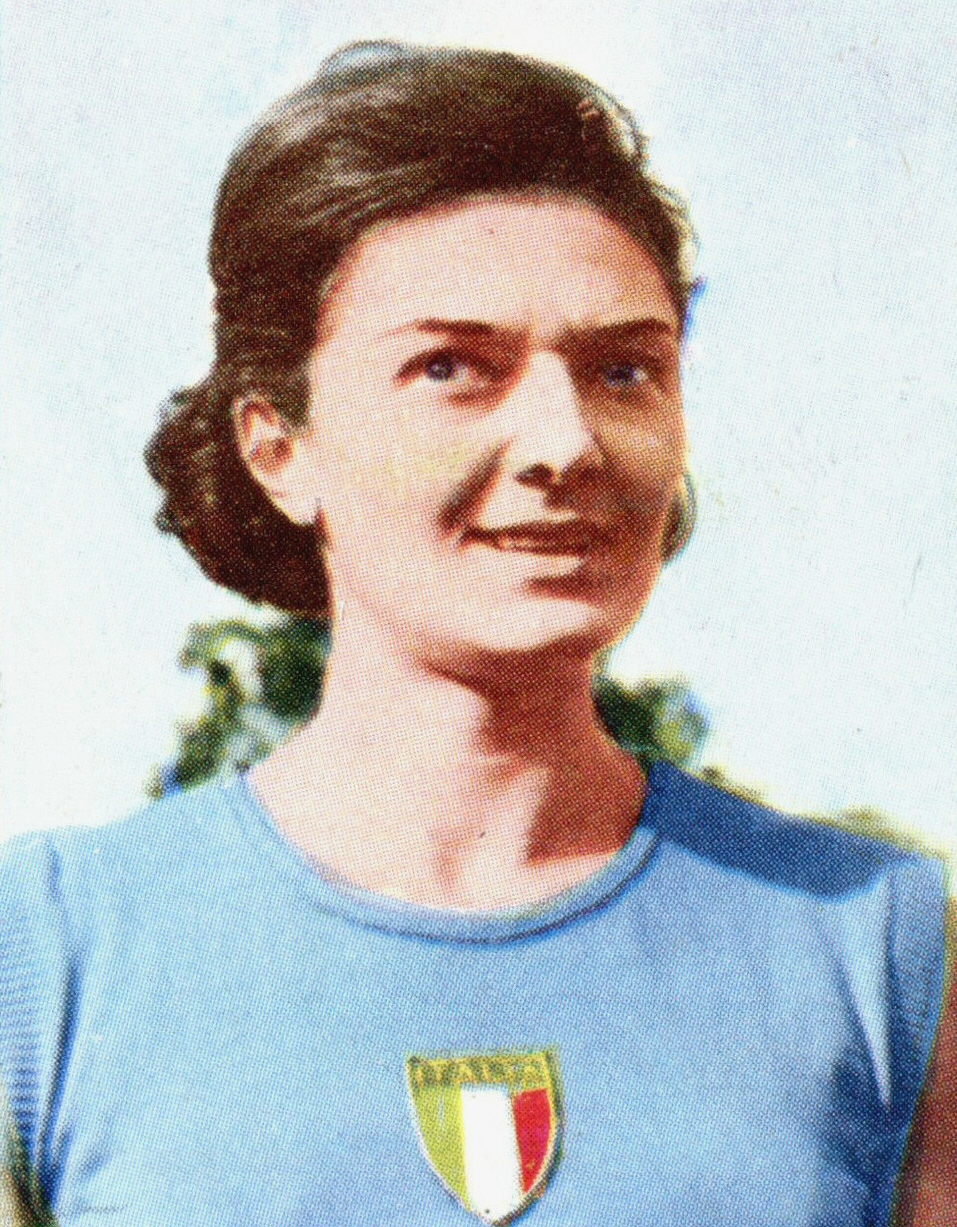

Personal information
- Nationality: Italian
- Born: 14 December 1936 (age 89) Milan, Italy
- Height: 1.70 m (5 ft 7 in)
- Weight: 68 kg (150 lb)

Sport
- Sport: Athletics
- Events: Discus throw Shot put
- Club: Imec Bergamo

Achievements and titles
- Personal best: Discus: 52.99 m (1965)
Medal record
Representing Italy
Summer Universiade
Silver medal – second place	1959 Turin	Discus throw

Elivia Ricci (later Ballotta, born 14 December 1936) is a retired Italian discus thrower who won a silver medal at the 1959 Summer Universiade. She competed at the 1960 Olympics and finished in 15th place.

== Biography ==
Ricci won 14 national championships at senior level,

At the 1960 Olympic Games in Rome, Ricci represented Italy in the discus throw competition.

Ricci married former Italian pole vaulter Edmondo Ballotta and competed under her married name thereafter.

Ballotta won the British WAAA Championships title in the discus throw event at the 1965 WAAA Championships.

== National titles ==
- shot put: 1961, 1963, 1964, 1965, 1966 (5)
- discus throw: 1958, 1959, 1960, 1961, 1962, 1963, 1964, 1965, 1966 (9)
