= Cinzia Petrucci =

Italian shot putter (born 1955)

Personal information
- Nationality: Italian
- Born: 28 October 1955 (age 70) Rome, Italy
- Height: 1.76 m (5 ft 9 1/2 in)
- Weight: 88 kg (194 lb)

Sport
- Country: Italy
- Sport: Athletics
- Event: Shot put
- Club: FIAT Torino

Achievements and titles
- Personal best: Shot put 18.74 m (1980)
Medal record
Mediterranean Games
Bronze medal – third place	1979 Split	Shot put

Cinzia Petrucci (born 28 October 1955 in Rome) is a former Italian shot putter. She won one medal, at senior level, at the International athletics competitions.

== Career ==
She competed at the 1980 Summer Olympics in Moscow, USSR. There she ended up in 14th and last place, with a distance of 17.27 metres.

== Olympic results ==
Year	Competition	Venue	Position	Event	Performance	Notes
1980	Olympic Games	(Soviet Union) Moscow	14th	Shot put	17.27 m	

== National titles ==
Cinzia Petrucci has won 15 times the individual national championship.

- 8 wins in the shot put (1973, 1974, 1975, 1976, 1977, 1978, 1980, 1981)
- 7 wins in the shot put indoor (1973, 1974, 1975, 1978, 1980 1981, 1982)

== See also ==
- Italian all-time lists - Shot put
