= Carlo Grippo =

Italian middle-distance runner

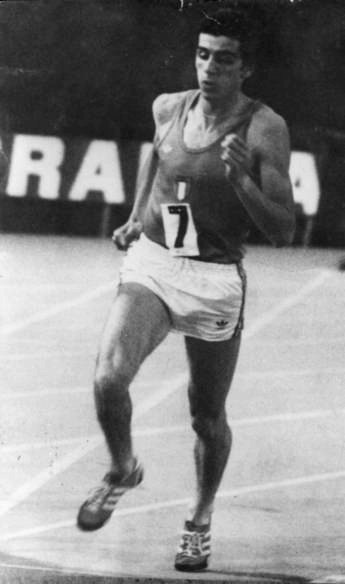

Personal information
- Nationality: Italian
- Born: January 8, 1955 (age 71) Rome, Italy
- Height: 1.80 m (5 ft 11 in)
- Weight: 65 kg (143 lb)

Sport
- Country: Italy
- Sport: Athletics
- Event: 800 metres
- Club: C.S. Carabinieri

Achievements and titles
- Personal bests: 800 m: 1:45.3 (1976); 800m indoor: 1:46"37; 400 m: 46.7 (1976); 1.500m: 3:40.68 (1980)

Carlo Grippo (born 8 January 1955, in Rome) is a former Italian middle distance runner. Also notable as an International executive for Global Sport and Fashion Brands.

== Biography ==
Carlo Grippo participated at two editions of the Summer Olympics (1976 and 1980), he has 25 caps in national team from 1974 to 1981.

== Achievements ==
Year	Competition	Venue	Position	Event	Performance	Note
1976	Olympic Games	(Canada) Montreal	8th	800 metres	1:48.39	
1980	Olympic Games	(Soviet Union) Moscow	SF	800 metres	1:48.68	

== National titles ==
Carlo Grippo has won 10 times the individual national championship.

- 6 wins in the 800 metres (1974, 1976, 1978, 1979, 1980, 1981)
- 1 win in the 1500 metres (1980)
- 2 wins in the 800 metres indoor (1977, 1979)
- 1 win in the 1500 metres indoor (1974)

== See also ==
- Italian all-time lists - 800 metres
- 800 metres winners of Italian Athletics Championships
