= Silvano Meconi =

Italian athlete

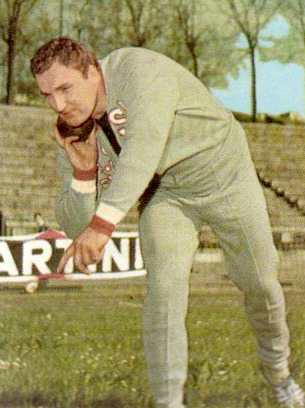

Personal information
- Nationality: Italian
- Born: 28 October 1931 (age 94) Cortona, Italy
- Died: 22 September 2005 (aged 73) Florence, Italy
- Height: 1.88 m (6 ft 2 in)
- Weight: 118 kg (260 lb)

Sport
- Country: Italy
- Sport: Athletics
- Event: Shot put
- Club: Giglio Rosso

Achievements and titles
- Personal best: 18.82 m (1960)
Medal record
Mediterranean Games
Gold medal – first place	1963 Naples	Shot put
Bronze medal – third place	1955 Barcelona	Shot put

Silvano Meconi (28 October 1931 – 22 September 2005) was an Italian shot putter who won two medals at the Mediterranean Games.

== Biography ==
He competed at the 1956, 1960, and 1964 Olympics and finished in 10th, 13th, and 17th place, respectively. From 1955 to 1969, he took part in 47 international competitions and won 13 national titles.

== See also ==
- Italian Athletics Championships – Multi winners
- Italy national athletics team – More caps
- Shot put winners of Italian Athletics Championships
