= Antonio Ambu =

Italian long-distance runner

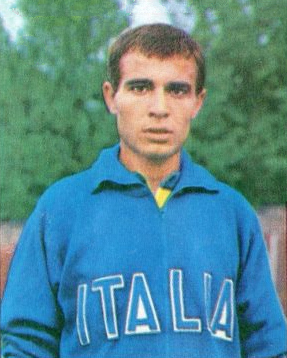

Personal information
- Nationality: Italian
- Born: 10 March 1936 (age 90) Cagliari, Italy

Sport
- Country: Italy
- Sport: Athletics
- Event(s): Middle distance running Long-distance running
- Club: Lilion Snia Varedo

Achievements and titles
- Personal best: Marathon: 2:18.04 (19 April 1967 - Boston)
Medal record
Mediterranean Games
Gold medal – first place	1967 Tunis	Half marathon

Antonio Ambu (born 10 May 1936) is an Italian former long-distance runner who competed in the 1964 Summer Olympics and in the 1968 Summer Olympics.

== National titles ==
Antonio Ambu has won 34 times the individual national championship.

- 6 wins on 5000 metres (1958, 1961, 1962, 1964, 1965, 1967)
- 7 wins on 10000 metres (1958, 1962, 1964, 1965, 1966, 1967, 1968)
- 7 wins on Half marathon (1961, 1962, 1964, 1965, 1966, 1967, 1968)
- 7 wins on Marathon (1962, 1964, 1965, 1966, 1967, 1968, 1969)
- 7 wins on Cross country running (1959, 1963, 1964, 1966, 1967, 1968, 1969)

== See also ==
- Men's marathon Italian record progression
- Italian Athletics Championships - Multi winners
- 5000 metres winners of Italian Athletics Championships
- 10000 metres winners of Italian Athletics Championships
