= Giampaolo Urlando =

Italian hammer thrower (born 1945)

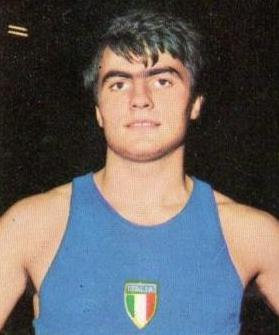

Personal information
- Nationality: Italian
- Born: January 7, 1945 (age 81) Padua, Italy
- Height: 1.78 m (5 ft 10 in)
- Weight: 100 kg (220 lb)

Sport
- Sport: Athletics
- Event: Hammer throw
- Club: Snia Milano

Achievements and titles
- Personal best: Hammer throw: 78.16 m (1984)
Medal record
Representing Italy
Mediterranean Games
Gold medal – first place	1979 Split	Hammer throw
Gold medal – first place	1983 Casablanca	Hammer throw

Giampaolo Urlando (born 7 January 1945, in Padua) is a retired Italian hammer thrower.

== Biography ==
He ended up in fourth place at the 1984 Summer Olympics, but was disqualified for testosterone use.

== Achievements ==
Year	Competition	Venue	Position	Notes
1979	Mediterranean Games	Split, Yugoslavia	1st	
1980	Olympic Games	Moscow, Soviet Union	7th	
1981	World Cup	Rome, Italy	3rd	
1982	European Championships	Athens, Greece	11th	
1983	Mediterranean Games	Casablanca, Morocco	1st	
1983	World Championships	Helsinki, Finland	13th	72.06 m
1984	Olympic Games	Los Angeles, United States	DSQ	

== National titles ==
Giampaolo Urlando has won 10 times the individual national championship.

- 10 wins in Hammer throw (1967, 1975, 1976, 1977, 1978, 1979, 1980, 1981, 1982, 1983)

== See also ==
- Italian all-time top lists - Hammer throw
