= Italian Athletics Championships =

Italian annual national championships in athletics

Italian Athletics Championships Campionati italiani assoluti di atletica leggera
- Current season, competition or edition: 2026 Italian Athletics Championships
- Sport: Athletics
- Founded: 1906
- First season: 1906 Italian Athletics Championships
- Country: Italy
- Related competitions: Indoor Championships
- Website: Fidal.it

The Italian Athletics Championships (Italian: Campionati italiani assoluti di atletica leggera) are the national championships in athletics, organised every year by the Federazione Italiana di Atletica Leggera.

The first edition, four races only, was held in 1906 at Arena Civica in Milan, just after the foundation of the Federazione Podistica Italiana and with the organization of La Gazzetta dello Sport.

Since then, 110 editions were held with the only exceptions of the years 1915-1918 and 1944. During 1945, only athletes of Northern Italy could participate but FIDAL considered this edition as an official one.

To the running races, in 1913 the field events were added.

Some facts have to be underlined:

- in 1920, track events were disputed in Rome and field events in Milan;
- in 1922, 2 towns hosted the championships, Milan and Busto Arsizio;
- in 1931, 3 sessions were held in Bologna, Rome and Milan;
- in 1932, 2 towns hosted the events: Pisa and Milan;
- the first male and female championships were held together in 1953 (always separated before that year);
- in 1974, for preparing the 1974 European Championships in Rome, it was implemented for the first time automatic timing but the Federation decided to diminish the time of 16/100th the first day and of 18/100th on the following 2 days; The Italian Championships held in 2010 in Grosseto were the 100th edition (not held just five times: 1915, 1916, 1917, 1918 and 1944 in 105 years from 1906 to 2010).

== Editions ==
Shows only the main venue of the events (usually marathon, race walk, 10000 metres and combined events were held in different venues). In 2013 the Championships backs in Arena Civica in Milan.

The number of editions refers to the male ones, the female ones are 19 less. The first women's edition was disputed in 1923 and until 1952 the men's and women's championships disputed the two different venues. Only from the 1953 edition the championships were disputed in a single venue.

#	Year	Venue	Date
UPT & UPI Championships	1898	Turin	2 October
UPT & UPI Championships	1899	Turin	1 October
UPT & UPI Championships	1900	Turin	8–9 September
UPT & UPI Championships	1901	Turin	15 September
UPT & UPI Championships	1902	Turin	21 September
UPT & UPI Championships	1903	Alba	20 September
UPT & UPI Championships	1904	not held	
UPT & UPI Championships	1905	Vercelli	18 June
1	1906	Turin	30 September
1	1906	Milan	21 October
2	1907	Rome	17–18 September
3	1908	Rome	31 May-3 June
4	1909	Rome	4–5 June
5	1910	Milan	8–9 October
6	1911	Rome	7–9 September
7	1912	Verona	16–19 May
8	1913	Milan	20–21 September
9	1914	Milan	26–27 September
	1915/18	not held	
10	1919	Milan	11–12 October
11	1920	Rome	18–20 September
11	1920	Milan	2–3 October
12	1921	Bologna	18–20 September
13	1922	Busto Arsizio	16–17 September
13	1922	Milan	23–24 September
14	1923	Bologna	20–24 June
14	1923	Milan	6 May
15	1924	Bologna	20–21 September
16	1925	Bologna	28–29 September
17	1926	Naples	12–13 June
18	1927	Bologna	1–20 September
19	1928	Milan	30 June–1 July
20	1929	Bologna	21–22 September
21	1930	Udine	26–27 June
22	1931	Milan	24–31 May
23	1932	Pisa	18 September
23	1932	Bologna	1 October
23	1932	Florence	12–13 November
24	1933	Florence	29–30 July
24	1933	Genoa	28–29 October
25	1934	Milan	28–29 July
25	1934	Florence	20–21 October
26	1935	Florence	28–29 July
26	1935	Milan	13 October
26	1935	Bologna	19–20 October
27	1936	Bologna	28–29 June
27	1936	Bologna	31 October-1 November
27	1936	Parma	4 October
28	1937	Florence	24–25 July
28	1937	Florence	7–8 August
29	1938	Bologna	23–24 July
29	1938	Milan	16–17 July
30	1939	Turin	22–23 July
30	1939	Modena	16–17 September
31	1940	Milan	20–21 July
31	1940	Turin	5–6 October
32	1941	Turin	19–20 July
32	1941	Parma	6 July
32	1941	Piacenza	3 August
32	1941	Parma	4–5 October
33	1942	Bologna	11–12 July
33	1942	Parma	14 June
33	1942	Milan	24–25 October
33	1942	Parma	8 November
34	1943	Milan	10–11 July
34	1943	Florence	18 July
	1944	not held	
35	1945	Bologna	20–21 October
35	1945	Turin	6–7 October
36	1946	Milan	4–6 October
37	1947	Florence	26–28 September
38	1948	Genoa	24–26 September
39	1949	Bari	23–25 September
40	1950	Turin	29–30 September
41	1951	Milan	28–30 September
42	1952	Bologna	17–19 October
43	1953	Rome	22–27 September
44	1954	Florence	1–3 October
45	1955	Milan	30 September-2 October
46	1956	Rome	28–30 September
47	1957	Bologna	13–15 September
48	1958	Rome	12–14 September
49	1959	Rome	23–25 September
50	1960	Bologna	23-25 September
50	1960	Genoa	22–23 October
51	1961	Turin	22–24 September
52	1962	Naples	12–14 October
53	1963	Trieste	19–21 July
54	1964	Milan	27–29 June
55	1965	Rome	9–11 July
56	1966	Florence	8–10 July
57	1967	Bologna	7–9 July
58	1968	Trieste	5–7 July
59	1969	Milan	27–29 June
60	1970	Rome	14–15 July
61	1971	Rome	7–8 July
62	1972	Rome	12–13 July
63	1973	Rome	10–11 July
64	1974	Rome	30 July-1 August
65	1975	Florence	22–24 July
66	1976	Turin	6–8 July
67	1977	Rome	26–27 July
68	1978	Rome	25–26 July
69	1979	Rome	16–18 July
70	1980	Turin	24–26 July
71	1981	Turin	14–15 July
72	1982	Rome	20–21 July
73	1983	Rome	19–20 July
74	1984	Rome	10–11 July
75	1985	Rome	9–11 July
75	1985	Salerno	28 April
76	1986	Turin	22–24 July
77	1987	Rome	28–30 July
78	1988	Milan	6–8 September
79	1989	Cesenatico	25–26 July
80	1990	Pescara	12–13 September
81	1991	Turin	11–12 June
82	1992	Bologna	23–24 June
83	1993	Bologna	2–3 August
84	1994	Naples	2–3 July
85	1995	Cesenatico	1–2 July
86	1996	Bologna	24–26 May
87	1997	Milan	4–6 July
88	1998	Rome	9–10 July
89	1999	Pescara	3–4 July
90	2000	Milan	5–6 September
91	2001	Catania	7–8 July
92	2002	Viareggio	18-21 July
93	2003	Rieti	2-3 August
94	2004	Florence	25-27 June
95	2005	Brixen	25-26 June
96	2006	Turin	7-8 July
97	2007	Padua	26-28 July
98	2008	Cagliari	18-20 July
99	2009	Milan	31 July-2 August
100	2010	Grosseto	30 June-1 July
101	2011	Turin	25–26 June
102	2012	Brixen	6–8 July
103	2013	Milan	26–28 July
104	2014	Rovereto	18–20 July
105	2015	Turin	24–26 July
106	2016	Rieti	24–26 June
107	2017	Trieste	30 June-1 July
108	2018	Pescara	7–9 September
109	2019	Brixen	26–28 July
110	2020	Padua and Modena	28–30 August
111	2021	Rovereto	25–27 June
112	2022	Rieti	24-26 June
113	2023	Molfetta	28–30 July
114	2024	La Spezia	29–30 June
115	2025	Caorle	2–3 August
116	2026	Florence	25–26 July

== Championship records ==
=== Men ===
Event	Performance	Athlete	Date	Championships	Place	Notes	Ref.
100 m	10.01 (−1.0 m/s)	Marcell Jacobs	26 June 2021	2021 Championships	Rovereto		
200 m	20.30 (−0.5 m/s)	Pietro Mennea	27 July 1977	1977 Championships	Rome		
400 m	45.12	Matteo Galvan	25 June 2016	2016 Championships	Rieti		
800 m	1:45.3	Carlo Grippo	7 July 1976	1976 Championships	Turin		
1500 m	3:38.24	Alessandro Lambruschini	2 August 1993		Bologna		
5000 m	13:30.26	Alberto Cova	2 July 1985	1985 Championships	Rome		
10,000 m	28:00.20	Francesco Panetta	24 July 1986	1986 Championships	Turin		
110 m hurdles	13.18 (−1.3 m/s)	Lorenzo Simonelli	29 June 2024	2024 Championships	La Spezia		
400 m hurdles	48.33	Fabrizio Mori	26 May 1996		Bologna		
3000 m steeplechase	8:17.65	Ala Zoghlami	27 June 2021	2021 Championships	Rovereto		
High jump	2.36 m	Gianmarco Tamberi	26 June 2016	2016 Championships	Rieti		
Pole vault	5.75 m	Fabio Pizzolato	6 July 1995		Milan	NR	
Long jump	8.21 m (+1.4 m/s)	Andrew Howe	27 July 2007	2007 Championships	Padua		
Triple jump	17.87 m (+0.7 m/s)	Andy Díaz Hernádez	25 July 2026	2026 Championships	Florence	current NR	
Shot put	22.82 m	Leonardo Fabbri	2 August 2025	2023 Championships	Caorle		
Discus throw	64.26 m	Luciano Zerbini	2 August 1993		Bologna		
Hammer throw	80.98 m	Loris Paoluzzi	4 July 1999		Pescara		
Javelin throw	80.35 m	Roberto Orlando	26 June 2021	2021 Championships	Rovereto		
Half marathon	1:00:47	Giuliano Battocletti	29 September 2002		Udine		
Marathon	2:10:30	Migidio Bourifa	18 March 2007	2007 Championships	Rome		
20 km race walk	1:19:49	Marco Giungi	7 April 2002		Grosseto		
50 km race walk	3:36:04	Alex Schwazer	11 February 2007	2007 Championships	Rosignano	current NR	
Decathlon	8069 pts	Beniamino Poserina	18 May 1997		Desenzano		

=== Women ===
Event	Performance	Athlete	Date	Championships	Place	Notes	Ref.
100 m	11.20 (+0.8 m/s)	Zaynab Dosso	29 June 2024	2024 Championships	La Spezia		
200 m	22.89 (+1.4 m/s)	Gloria Hooper	26 June 2016	2016 Championships	Rieti		
200 m	22.89 (+0.1 m/s)	Dalia Kaddari	27 June 2021	2021 Championships	Rovereto		
400 m	50.55	Libania Grenot	19 July 2014	2014 Championships	Rovereto		
800 m	2:00.35	Gabriella Dorio	20 July 1982	1982 Championships	Rome		
1500 m	4:03.27	Gabriella Dorio	15 July 1981	1981 Championships	Turin		
5000 m	15:22.45	Veronica Inglese	25 June 2016	2016 Championships	Rieti		
10,000 m	31:53.55	Maria Guida	5 May 1996		Pietrasanta		
100 m hurdles	12.87 (+0.4 m/s)	Giada Carmassi	29 June 2024	2024 Championships	La Spezia		
400 m hurdles	54.22	Ayomide Folorunso	30 July 2023	2023 Championships	Molfetta	current NR	
3000 m steeplechase	9.51.89	Isabel Mattuzzi	9 September 2018	2018 Championships	Pescara		
High jump	2.01 m	Antonietta Di Martino	30 June 2010	2010 Championships	Grosseto		
Pole vault	4.60 m	Anna Giordano Bruno	2 August 2009	2009 Championships	Milan		
Pole vault	4.60 m	Roberta Bruni	30 July 2023	2023 Championships	Molfetta		
Long jump	6.93 m	Fiona May	25 May 1996		Bologna	7.12 (+3.4 m/s)	
Triple jump	14.62 m (+1.3 m/s)	Simona La Mantia	26 June 2005	2005 Championships	Brixen		
Shot put	19.13 m	Chiara Rosa	28 July 2007	2007 Championships	Padua		
Discus throw	63.25 m	Daisy Osakue	29 July 2023	2023 Championships	Molfetta		
Hammer throw	73.59 m	Ester Balassini	25 June 2005	2005 Championships	Brixen		
Javelin throw	63.82 m	Claudia Coslovich	8 July 2001		Catania		
10 km walk (road)	41:28	Antonella Palmisano	18 October 2020	2020 Championships	Modena	current NB	

== Multi winners ==
Still active

Updated to 2024 Italian Athletics Championships (June 2024).

=== Men ===
Angiolo Profeti (shot put) and Adolfo Consolini (discus throw), with their 15 outdoor titles, are those who have won the highest number in a single specialty.

Still active

Titles	Athlete	Events
40	Abdon Pamich	10000 walk (13), 20 km walk (13), 50 km walk (14)
34	Antonio Ambu	5000 m (6), 10000 m (7), Marathon (7), Half marathon (7), cross country (7)
28	Giovanni De Benedictis	10000 walk (8), 20 km walk (8), 50 km walk (2), 5000 m walk indoor (10)
28	Nicola Vizzoni	Hammer (14), Hammer winters (14)
26	Giuseppe Dordoni	10000 walk (11), 20 km walk (10), 50 km walk (5)
26	Paolo Dal Soglio	Shot put (12), Shot put indoor (14)
24	Adolfo Contoli	110 m hs (5), 400 m hs (2), Pole vault (1), Long jump (2), Standing HJ (3), Standing LJ (3), Standing TJ (3), Pentathlon (4), Decathlon (1)
23	Fabrizio Donato	Triple jump (8), Long jump indoor (3), Triple jump indoor (12)
21	Maurizio Damilano	10000 walk (7), 20 km walk (10), 50 km walk (3), 5000 m walk indoor (1)
19	Francesco Fortunato	10 km walk (6), 20 km walk (4), 5000 m walk indoor (9)
18	Marco Lingua	Hammer (8), Hammer winters (10)
17	Luigi Facelli	400 m (2), 110 m hs (2), 400 m hs (11), Triple jump (2)
16	Pietro Mennea	100 m (3), 200 m (11), 60 m indoor (1), 400 m indoor (1)
16	Dario Badinelli	Triple jump (10), Triple jump indoor (6)
16	Vittorio Visini	20 km walk (1), 50 km walk (7), 5000 m walk indoor (8)
16	Angiolo Profeti	Shot put (15), Discus (1)
15	Giuseppe Lippi	5000 m (1), 10000 m (2), 3000 steeplechase (5), cross country (7)
15	Giuseppe Beviacqua	5000 m (6), 10000 m (7), cross country (2)
15	Adolfo Consolini	Discus (15)

=== Women ===
Agnese Maffeis (38) and Marisa Masullo (30) are the Italian women multi winners.

Titles	Athlete	Events
38	Agnese Maffeis	Shot put (5), Discus (14), Shot put indoor (9), Discus winter (10)
30	Marisa Masullo	100 m (11), 200 m (10), 60 m indoor (6), 200 m indoor (3)
30	Chiara Rosa	Shot put (18), Shot put indoor (12)
26	Donata Govoni	100 m (7), 200 m (5), 400 m (7), 800 m (2), Cross country (1), 400 m indoor (2), 800 m indoor (2)
25	Sara Simeoni	High jump (14), Pentathlon (1), High jump indoor (10)
23	Gabriella Dorio	800 m (7), 1500 m (10), 800 m indoor (2), 1500 m indoor (2), Cross country (2)
22	Agnese Possamai	800 m (2), 3000 m (5), 1500 m indoor (5), 3000 m indoor (3), Cross country (7)
20	Claudia Coslovich	Javelin (13), Javelin winter (7)
20	Amelia Piccinini	Shot put (12), Long jump (4), Pentathlon (4)
19	Erica Rossi	400 m (11), 800 m (1), 200 m indoor (2), 400 m indoor (6)
19	Paola Pigni	400 m (2), 800 m (6), 1500 m (4), 3000 m (1), Cross country (6)
19	Claudia Testoni	60 m (1), 80 m (1), 100 m (3), 200 m (2), 80 m hs (5), Long jump (7)
18	Antonella Capriotti	Long jump (8), Triple jump (9), 60 m indoor (1), Long jump indoor (5)
18	Giuseppina Leone	100 m (9), 200 m (9)
18	Magalì Vettorazzo	100 m hs (7), Long jump (4) Pentathlon (7)
17	Zahra Bani	Javelin (8), Javelin winter (9)

== 10,000 m track championships ==
Due to television requirements (the race was too long), since 2013 the 10,000 m track championships have been held at a separate location and date, prior to the global national championships. Therefore, Bressanone 2012 was the last edition to include the 10,000 m track race, while Ancona 2013, held in May before the Milan championships, was the first stand-alone edition.

=== Edition ===
Year	Venue	Date
2013	Ancona	18 May
2014	Ferrara	17 May
2015	Isernia	17 May
2016	Castel Porziano	14 May
2017	Rome	13 May
2018	Ferrara	12 May
2019	Monselice	18 May
2020	Vittorio Veneto	27 September
2021	Molfetta	2 May
2022	Brescia	1 May
2023	Brescia	7 May
2024	Potenza	12 May
2025	Cosenza	27 April
2026	Sulmona	26 April

=== Champions ===
Year	Men	Women	Note
2013	Jamel Chatbi	Valeria Straneo	
2014	Jamel Chatbi	Veronica Inglese	
2015	Said El Otmani	Claudia Pinna	
2016	Ahmed El Mazoury	Rosaria Console	
2017	Ahmed El Mazoury	Sara Dossena	
2018	Stefano La Rosa	Rosaria Console	
2019	Lorenzo Dini	Isabel Mattuzzi	
2020	Osama Zoghlami	Valeria Straneo	
2021	Iliass Aouani	Martina Merlo	
2022	Pietro Riva	Anna Arnaudo	
2023	Pietro Riva	Nadia Battocletti	
2024	Pietro Riva	Anna Arnaudo	
2025	Francesco Guerra	Sara Nestola	
2026	Francesco Guerra	Federica Del Buono	

== Italian Winter Throwing Championships ==
The Italian Winter Throwing Championships (Campionati italiani invernali di lanci), are the Italian championships of three of the throwing events in athletics (the discus throw, hammer throw, and javelin throw), which, for logistical reasons, do not have an indoor championship. The fourth throwing event in track and field, shot put, is included in the Italian Athletics Indoor Championships instead.

The championships are organized by FIDAL (Italian Athletics Federation) since 1984. The 2022 edition was held in Mariano Comense. Focus was upon Sara Fantini, female hammer thrower, who had recently thrown 72.61 meters, close to the Italian women's national record of 73.59 meters (achieved by Ester Balassini in 2005). She did win, but with a best throw of 68.18 meters.

Winter is not the only period of competitive throwing in Italy, at least not when international competitions are held in the nation. Notably, at the 2007 IAAF Golden League in Rome, French high jumper Salim Sdiri was hit by a javelin. In 2010, IAAF's Golden League was replaced by World Athletics' Diamond League, which provides perhaps the highest level of competition in outdoor track and field. The Diamond League's annual Golden Gala, which includes all four throwing events, has been held every year from 2010 to 2022 at the Stadio Olimpico in Rome, with exception that in 2021 it was held in Florence.

=== Venues ===
Year	Venue	Date
1984	Palermo	26 February
1985	Palermo	6 March
1986	Tirrenia	1 March
1987	Formia	28 February
1988	Palermo (men)	13 March
1988	Latina (women)	6 March
1989	Tirrenia	25 February
1990	Tirrenia	25 February
1991	Tirrenia	10 March
1992	Tirrenia	8 March
1993	Tirrenia	7 March
1994	Tirrenia	6 March
1995	Schio	4 March
1996	Tirrenia	24 February
1997	Rome	9 March
1998	Vigna di Valle	21–22 February
1999	Vigna di Valle	27–28 February
2000	Ascoli Piceno	26–27 February
2001	Pietrasanta	3–4 March
2002	Ascoli Piceno	2–3 March
2003	Gioia Tauro	15–16 February
2004	Ascoli Piceno	28–29 February
2005	Vigna di Valle	26–27 February
2006	Ascoli Piceno	4–5 March
2007	Bari	3–4 March
2008	San Benedetto del Tronto	23–24 February
2009	Bari	28 February-1 March
2010	San Benedetto del Tronto	6–7 March
2011	Viterbo	12–13 March
2012	Lucca	25–26 February
2013	Lucca	23–24 February
2014	Lucca	22–23 February
2015	Lucca	21–22 February
2016	Lucca	20–21 February
2017	Rieti	25–26 February
2018	Rieti	24–25 February
2019	Lucca	23–24 February
2020	Lucca	7–8 March (cancelled due COVID-19)
2021	Molfetta	27–28 February
2022	Mariano Comense	26–27 February
2023	Rieti	25–26 February
2024	Mariano Comense	24-25 February
2025	Rieti	1-2 March
2026	Mariano Comense	28 February-1 March

=== Winners ===
==== Men ====
In bold the record of Championships

Year	Discus throw		Hammer throw		Javelin throw	
Year	Athlete	Measure	Athlete	Measure	Athlete	Measure
1984	Marco Bucci	**65.16**	Orlando Bianchini	76.00	Alberto Serrani	64.14
1985	Marco Martino	61.48	Lucio Serrani	71.32	Fabio De Gaspari	74.90
1986	Marco Martino (2)	61.04	Lucio Serrani (2)	67.32	not disputed	
1987	Marco Martino (3)	61.52	Enrico Sgrulletti	73.00	Riccardo Coppoli	59.24
1988	Marco Martino (4)	59.58	Enrico Sgrulletti (2)	72.42	Ivan Soffiato	69.00
1989	Marco Martino (5)	61.48	Giuliano Zanello	76.04	Riccardo Mannelli	59.40
1990	Luciano Zerbini	62.22	Enrico Sgrulletti (3)	71.38	Sergio Visentini	72.36
1991	Marco Martino (6)	60.10	Nicola Sundas	68.30	Agostino Ghesini	69.92
1992	Adriano Coos	56.48	Emilio Calabrò	69.38	Fabio De Gaspari (2)	72.74
1993	Marco Martino (7)	59.06	Emilio Calabrò (2)	74.06	Ivan Soffiato (2)	69.16
1994	Alessandro Urlando	55.46	Nicola Vizzoni	70.68	Marco Belletti	72.92
1995	Diego Fortuna	58.50	Giovanni Sanguin	70.78	Daniele Ferazzuto	70.50
1996	Marco Martino (8)	58.60	Enrico Sgrulletti (4)	75.42	Armin Kerer	69.80
1997	Alessandro Urlando (2)	56.78	Enrico Sgrulletti (5)	**81.64**	Alberto Desiderio	71.54
1998	Diego Fortuna (2)	57.93	Nicola Vizzoni (2)	75.30	Carlo Sonego	77.07
1999	Diego Fortuna (3)	63.13	Nicola Vizzoni (3)	77.36	Alberto Desiderio (2)	77.76
2000	Diego Fortuna (4)	62.82	Nicola Vizzoni (4)	77.65	Armin Kerer (2)	72.00
2001	Cristiano Andrei	60.75	Nicola Vizzoni (5)	78.14	Alberto Desiderio (3)	76.42
2002	Stefano Lomater	62.12	Nicola Vizzoni (6)	75.54	Alberto Desiderio (4)	74.96
2003	Diego Fortuna (5)	59.36	Nicola Vizzoni (7)	74.35	Alberto Desiderio (5)	75.10
2004	Stefano Lomater (2)	58.91	Nicola Vizzoni (8)	75.90	Alberto Pignata	76.27
2005	Cristiano Andrei (2)	54.47	Marco Lingua	72.90	Alberto Pignata (2)	77.62
2006	Cristiano Andrei (3)	59.16	Marco Lingua (2)	75.02	Francesco Pignata	75.27
2007	Hannes Kirchler	61.45	Marco Lingua (3)	76.49	Francesco Pignata (2)	76.27
2008	Diego Fortuna (6)	60.45	Nicola Vizzoni (9)	76.45	Francesco Pignata (3)	70.51
2009	Giovanni Faloci	60.38	Nicola Vizzoni (10)	75.95	Emanuele Sabbio	70.20
2010	Giovanni Faloci (2)	61.09	Nicola Vizzoni (11)	77.38	Gianluca Tamberi	70.37
2011	Federico Apolloni	57.16	Nicola Vizzoni (12)	73.26	Leonardo Gottardo	75.83
2012	Giovanni Faloci (3)	59.95	Lorenzo Povegliano	75.50	Norbert Bonvecchio	73.16
2013	Eduardo Albertazzi	61.55	Nicola Vizzoni (13)	72.90	Leonardo Gottardo (2)	72.18
2014	Hannes Kirchler (2)	58.53	Nicola Vizzoni (14)	74.83	Norbert Bonvecchio (2)	73.41
2015	Federico Apolloni (2)	59.93	Marco Lingua (4)	70.76	Norbert Bonvecchio (3)	77.04
2016	Giovanni Faloci (4)	59.52	Marco Lingua (5)	75.87	Antonio Fent	77.94
2017	Hannes Kirchler (3)	59.27	Marco Lingua (6)	75.61	Mauro Fraresso	74.11
2018	Federico Apolloni (3)	57.33	Marco Lingua (7)	74.62	Mauro Fraresso (2)	77.84
2019	Giovanni Faloci (5)	60.96	Marco Lingua (8)	73.56	Mauro Fraresso (3)	**81.79**
2020	Cancelled due COVID-19					
2021	Nazzareno Di Marco	59.08	Marco Lingua (9)	70.98	Roberto Orlando	73.67
2022	Nazzareno Di Marco (2)	59.10	Giorgio Olivieri	74.39	Roberto Orlando (2)	74.82
2023	Giovanni Faloci (6)	57.89	Giorgio Olivieri (2)	73.03	Simone Comini	72.65
2024	Alessio Mannucci	61.83	Marco Lingua (10)	71.04	Michele Fina	71.95
2025	Enrico Saccomano	59.75	Giorgio Olivieri (3)	73.45	Giovanni Frattini	75.47
2026	Enrico Saccomano (2)	61.29	Davide Costa	69.59	Giovanni Frattini (2)	76.38

==== Women ====
In bold the record of Championships

Year	Hammer throw		Discus throw		Javelin throw	
Year	Athlete	Measure	Athlete	Measure	Athlete	Measure
1984	not yet established		Renata Scaglia	52.16	Ambra Giacchetti	55.46
1985	not yet established		not disputed		Valeria Pollacci	44.74
1986	not yet established		Agnese Maffeis	48.58	not disputed	
1987	not yet established		Maria Marello	51.88	Ambra Giacchetti (2)	49.00
1988	not yet established		Marcella Masper	48.06	Marinella Ambrosio	48.72
1989	not yet established		Maria Marello (2)	52.42	Claudia Gigliozzi	46.80
1990	not yet established		Maria Marello (3)	52.42	Gloria Crippa	51.44
1991	not yet established		Maria Marello (4)	54.64	Marinella Ambrosio (2)	49.86
1992	not yet established		Agnese Maffeis (2)	53.64	Claudia Gigliozzi (2)	50.38
1993	not yet established		Maria Marello (5)	50.54	Veronica Becuzzi	54.00
1994	Alessandra Coaccioli	45.66	Agnese Maffeis (3)	**60.66**	Sabina Guarnelli	52.60
1995	Monica Torazzi	43.50	Maria Marello (6)	53.44	Claudia Coslovich	59.22
1996	Maria Tranchina	52.16	Agnese Maffeis (4)	56.98	Cinzia Dallona	54.00
1997	Monica Torazzi (2)	57.52	Donatella Rigamonti	51.26	Claudia Gigliozzi (3)	51.22
1998	Ester Balassini	58.23	Agnese Maffeis (5)	58.76	Claudia Coslovich (2)	**62.80**
1999	Ester Balassini (2)	59.61	Agnese Maffeis (6)	54.77	Tiziana Rocco	57.27
2000	Ester Balassini (3)	61.13	Giorgia Baratella	52.76	Claudia Coslovich (3)	61.16
2001	Ester Balassini (4)	65.35	Agnese Maffeis (7)	52.59	Claudia Coslovich (4)	60.11
2002	Ester Balassini (5)	66.10	Agnese Maffeis (8)	57.04	Claudia Coslovich (5)	61.82
2003	Ester Balassini (6)	67.36	Agnese Maffeis (9)	54.65	Elisabetta Marin	57.57
2004	Ester Balassini (7)	67.86	Agnese Maffeis (10)	52.44	Claudia Coslovich (6)	56.57
2005	Ester Balassini (8)	70.02	Giorgia Baratella	52.57	Elisabetta Marin (2)	56.14
2006	Ester Balassini (9)	72.11	Giorgia Godino	53.41	Zahra Bani	55.91
2007	Clarissa Claretti	71.27	Cristina Checchi	57.17	Claudia Coslovich (7)	56.02
2008	Ester Balassini (10)	70.24	Laura Bordignon	59.21	Zahra Bani (2)	59.52
2009	Silvia Salis	67.63	Laura Bordignon (2)	57.84	Zahra Bani (3)	52.99
2010	Silvia Salis (2)	71.25	Laura Bordignon (3)	59.02	Zahra Bani (4)	58.75
2011	Silvia Salis (3)	67.45	Laura Bordignon (4)	52.57	Zahra Bani (5)	58.54
2012	Silvia Salis (4)	70.20	Laura Bordignon (5)	54.29	Zahra Bani (6)	57.81
2013	Elisa Magni	61.48	Valentina Aniballi	52.68	Zahra Bani (7)	51.93
2014	Silvia Salis (5)	70.48	Laura Bordignon (6)	53.49	Sara Jemai	52.92
2015	Silvia Salis (6)	69.36	Stefania Strumillo	54.88	Zahra Bani (8)	52.63
2016	Elisa Palmieri	65.75	Natalina Capoferri	54.46	Sara Jemai (2)	52.20
2017	Sara Fantini	67.28	Valentina Aniballi (2)	52.92	Zahra Bani (9)	57.87
2018	Sara Fantini (2)	56.60	Giada Andreutti	56.60	Sara Jemai (3)	55.35
2019	Sara Fantini (3)	65.87	Giada Andreutti (2)	56.10	Sara Jemai (4)	56.54
2020	Cancelled due COVID-19					
2021	Sara Fantini (4)	69.71	Stefania Strumillo (2)	53.39	Sara Jemai (5)	53.64
2022	Sara Fantini (5)	68.18	Daisy Osakue	61.63	Carolina Visca	55.81
2023	Sara Fantini (6)	**72.51**	Daisy Osakue (2)	56.06	Sara Jemai (6)	55.32
2024	Sara Fantini (7)	68.28	Daisy Osakue (3)	59.98	Paola Padovan	54.52
2025	Sara Fantini (7)	70.81	Daisy Osakue (4)	59.71	Paola Padovan (2)	54.09
2026	Sara Fantini (8)	68.73	Daisy Osakue (5)	59.79	Paola Padovan (3)	57,52

== See also ==
- List of Italian Athletics Championships winners
- Italian Athletics Indoor Championships
- Italian Cross Country Championships
- Italian Athletics Clubs Championships
- FIDAL (italian governing bodies for athletics)
- Athletics in Italy
- Italy national athletics team
- Italian records in athletics
- Category:National sport of athletics champions
