= Italian Cross Country Championships =

Sporting competition

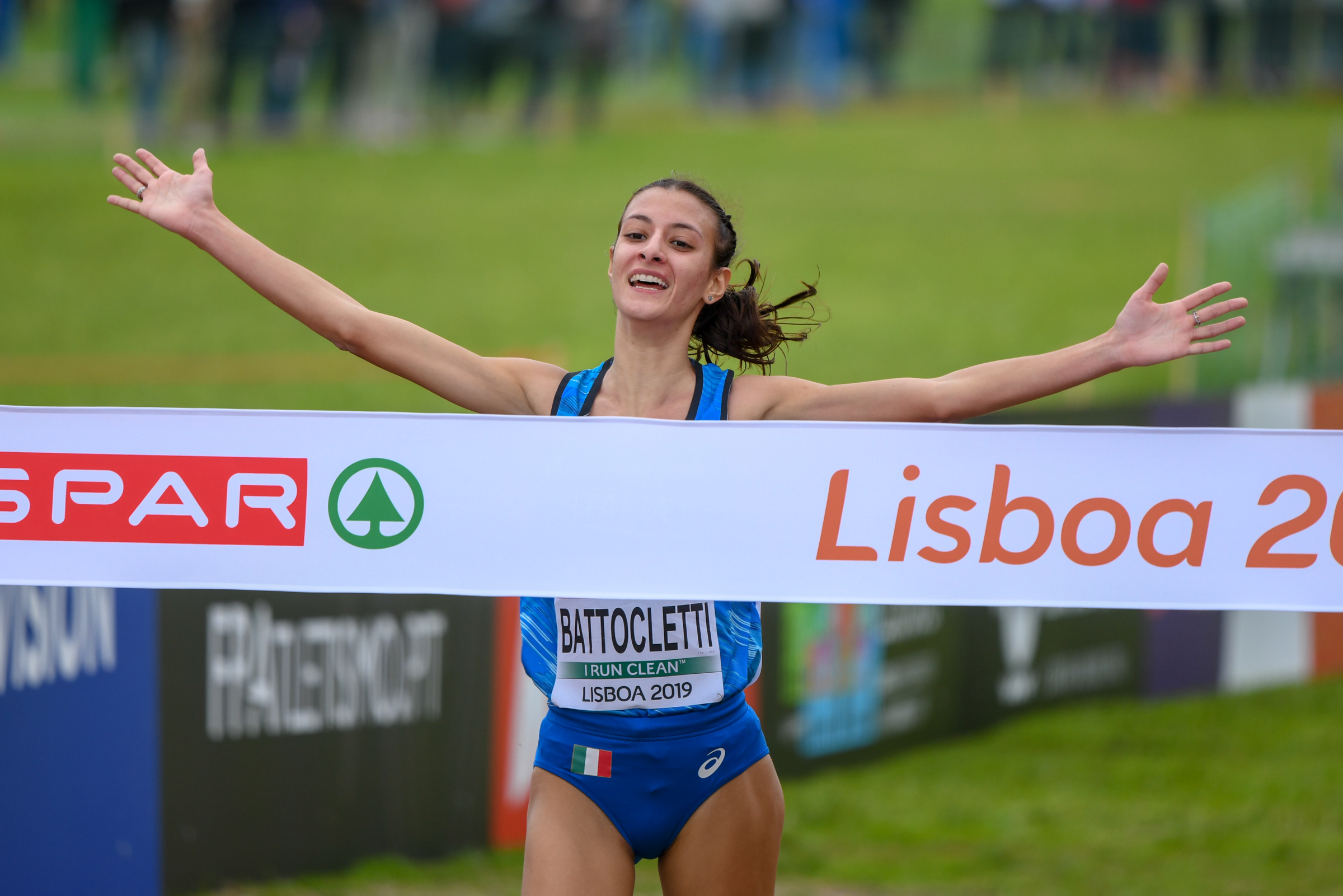
- Nadia Battocletti two-time Italian champion.
- Date: February/March
- Location: Various, Italy
- Event type: Cross country
- Distance: 10 km and 4 km for men 8 km for women
- Established: 1908

The Italian Cross Country Championships (Italian: Campionati Italiani di corsa campestre) is an annual cross country running competition that serves as Italy's national championship for the sport. It is usually held in February or March. It was first held in 1908 and featured a men's long course race only. A women's race was added to the programme in 1926.

The event includes separate races for both sexes across four categories: open (senior), under-23, under-20, and under-18 (Italian: assoluti, promesse, juniores, allievi). Short races were held for men and women from 1998 to 2006 (coinciding with the period that it was an official distance at the IAAF World Cross Country Championships). Short course champions were also elected in 1970 and 1971, but in no other years. Two championship races were held in 1925: one by FISA on 8 March and another by rival organisation UISA one week later.

The location of the championships varies from year to year and it has previously been incorporated into high level international races, such as the Cinque Mulini and Cross della Vallagarina.

== Editions ==
In 2020, due to the COVID-19 pandemic, its were canceled twice. A first time in Campi Bisenzio in March and second in November in Trieste.

=== Senior long race ===
Key: Course record

Edition	Year	Men's winner	Time (m:s)	Women's winner	Time (m:s)
	1908	Pericle Pagliani		Not held	
	1909	Pericle Pagliani		Not held	
—	1910	Not held			
	1911	Giuseppe Cattro		Not held	
—	1912	Not held			
	1913	Giuseppe Cattro		Not held	
	1914	Giuseppe Bausola		Not held	
	1915	Carlo Speroni		Not held	
—	1916	Not held due to World War I			
—	1917	Not held due to World War I			
—	1918	Not held due to World War I			
	1919	Lazzaro Parisio		Not held	
—	1920	Not held			
	1921	Carlo Martinenghi		Not held	
	1922	Ernesto Ambrosini		Not held	
	1923	Angelo Davoli		Not held	
	1924	Angelo Davoli		Not held	
	1925	Giuseppe Lippi/Angelo Davoli		Not held	
	1926	Angelo Davoli		Emilia Pedrazzani	
	1927	Giuseppe Lippi		Emilia Pedrazzani	
	1928	Giuseppe Lippi		Leandrina Bulzacchi	
	1929	Giuseppe Lippi		Giannina Marchini	
	1930	Giuseppe Lippi		Not held	
	1931	Nello Bartolini		Not held	
	1932	Nello Bartolini		Not held	
	1933	Umberto de Florentiis		Not held	
	1934	Luigi Pellin		Not held	
	1935	Luigi Pellin		Leandrina Bulzacchi	
	1936	Umberto de Florentiis		Leandrina Bulzacchi	
	1937	Giuseppe Lippi		Leandrina Bulzacchi	
	1938	Giuseppe Lippi		Leandrina Bulzacchi	
—	1939	Not held due to World War II			
—	1940	Not held due to World War II			
	1941	Giuseppe Lippi		Not held	
	1942	Salvatore Costantino		Not held	
	1943	Salvatore Costantino		Not held	
—	1944	Not held due to World War II			
—	1945	Not held due to World War II		Petronilla Tonani	
	1946	Aldo Rossi		Petronilla Tonani	
	1947	Cristofano Sestini		Giuliana De Maria	
	1948	Luigi Pelliccioli		Petronilla Tonani	
	1949	Giuseppe Beviacqua		Petronilla Tonani	
	1950	Giuseppe Beviacqua		Loredana Simonetti	
	1951	Giacomo Peppicelli		Loredana Simonetti	
	1952	Edoardo Righi		Bianca Bombardieri	
	1953	Giacomo Peppicelli		Bianca Bombardieri	
	1954	Giovanni Lai		Loredana Simonetti	
	1955	Giacomo Peppicelli		Maria Antonietta Albano	
	1956	Luigi Conti		Germana Bustreo	
	1957	Franco Volpi		Vita Virgilio	
	1958	Gianfranco Baraldi		Gilda Jannaccone	
	1959	Antonio Ambu		Gilda Jannaccone	
	1960	Franco Volpi		Gilda Jannaccone	
	1961	Francesco Perrone		Gilda Jannaccone	
	1962	Luigi Conti		Gilda Jannaccone	
	1963	Antonio Ambu		Gilda Jannaccone	
	1964	Antonio Ambu		Fernanda Ferrucci	
	1965	Luigi Conti		Fernanda Ferrucci	
	1966	Antonio Ambu		Fernanda Ferrucci	
	1967	Antonio Ambu		Paola Pigni	
	1968	Antonio Ambu		Paola Pigni	
	1969	Antonio Ambu		Paola Pigni	
	1970	Giovanni Pizzi		Paola Pigni	
	1971	Renato Martini		Donata Govoni	
	1972	Renato Martini		Angela Ramello	
	1973	Giuseppe Cindolo		Paola Pigni	
	1974	Franco Fava		Paola Pigni	
	1975	Franco Fava		Margherita Gargano	
	1976	Franco Fava		Gabriella Dorio	
	1977	Franco Fava		Cristina Tomasini	
	1978	Franco Fava		Agnese Possamai	
	1979	Luigi Zarcone		Margherita Gargano	
	1980	Venanzio Ortis		Agnese Possamai	
	1981	Claudio Solone		Agnese Possamai	
	1982	Alberto Cova		Agnese Possamai	
	1983	Alberto Cova		Gabriella Dorio	
	1984	Alberto Cova		Agnese Possamai	
	1985	Alberto Cova		Agnese Possamai	
	1986	Alberto Cova		Agnese Possamai	
	1987	Francesco Panetta		Maria Curatolo	
	1988	Francesco Panetta		Maria Curatolo	
	1989	Francesco Panetta		Nives Curti	
	1990	Francesco Panetta		Nadia Dandolo	
	1991	Francesco Panetta		Nadia Dandolo	
	1992	Francesco Panetta		Nadia Dandolo	
	1993	Vincenzo Modica		Rosanna Munerotto	
	1994	Umberto Pusterla		Maria Guida	
	1995	Umberto Pusterla		Rosanna Martin	
	1996	Gennaro Di Napoli		Patrizia Di Napoli	
	1997	Vincenzo Modica		Valentina Tauceri	
	1998	Umberto Pusterla		Sabrina Varrone	
	1999	Rachid Berradi		Sabrina Varrone	
	2000	Rachid Berradi		Agata Balsamo	
	2001	Michele Gamba		Agata Balsamo	
	2002	Rachid Berradi		Rosanna Martin	
	2003	Giuliano Battocletti		Patrizia Tisi	
	2004	Giuliano Battocletti		Patrizia Tisi	
	2005	Maurizio Leone		Patrizia Tisi	
	2006	Gabriele De Nard		Silvia Weissteiner	
	2007	Giuliano Battocletti		Renate Rungger	
	2008	Andrea Lalli		Silvia Weissteiner	
	2009	Andrea Lalli		Silvia Weissteiner	
	2010	Khaddour Slimani		Elena Romagnolo	
	2011	Daniele Meucci		Nadia Ejjafini	
	2012	Gabriele De Nard		Silvia Weissteiner	
	2013	Gabriele De Nard		Touria Samiri	
	2014	Jamel Chatbi		Veronica Inglese	
	2015	Andrea Lalli		Sara Dossena	
	2016	Yemaneberhan Crippa		Silvia La Barbera	
	2017	Daniele Meucci		Federica Dal Ri	
	2018	Yohanes Chiappinelli	30:52	Martina Merlo	28:52
	2019	Yemaneberhan Crippa		Francesca Tommasi	
	2020	not diputeded due Covid			
	2021	Iliass Aouani		Nadia Battocletti	
	2022	Iliass Aouani		Nadia Battocletti	
	2023	Marco Fontana Granotto		Nadia Battocletti	

=== Short race ===
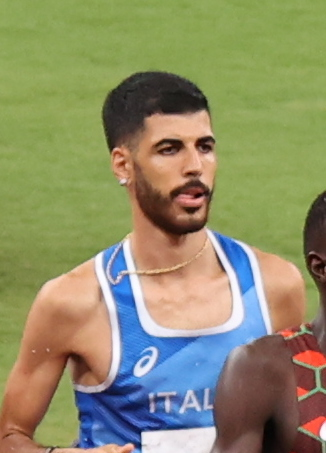
The Palermitan Ala Zoghlami two-time Italian champion.

Year	Men's winner	Time (m:s)	Women's winner	Time (m:s)
1970	Franco Arese	24:15.8	—	—
1971	Gianni Del Buono	17:56.8	—	—
1998	Luciano Di Pardo	10:54.3	Elisa Rea	11:32.7
1999	Luciano Di Pardo	11:26	Elisa Rea	13:29
2000	Luciano Di Pardo	11:36.1	Giovanna Arici	13:50.3
2001	Lorenzo Perrone	12:06	Sara Palmas	14:18
2002	Luciano Di Pardo	10:54	Sabrina Varrone	12:49
2003	Luciano Di Pardo	11:19	Silvia Weissteiner	13:05
2004	Luciano Di Pardo	11:10	Marzena Michalska	13:11
2005	Luciano Di Pardo	11:44	Federica Dal Ri	13:34
2006	Fabio Cesari	11:08	Angela Rinicella	12:54
2019	Osama Zoghlami	8:40	Marta Zenoni	9:57
2020	not disputed due CVovid			
2021	Ala Zoghlami	8:40	Nicole Reina	9:57
2022	Ala Zoghlami	8:39	Ludovica Cavalli	10:02
2023	Ala Zoghlami	8:54	Ludovica Cavalli	10:30

- The 2001 race was won by Englishwoman Catherine Berry in 14:09, though she was not eligible for the national championship.

== See also ==
- Italian Athletics Championships
