= 1953 Italian Athletics Championships =

Edition of the Italian Athletics Championships

- Dates: 25–27 September
- Host city: Rome
- Level: Senior
- Events: 27 individual (18 men, 9 women)

The 1953 Italian Athletics Championships was the 43rd edition of the Italian Athletics Championships and were held in Rome from 25 to 27 September.

It was the first edition in which the men's and women's competitions took place in a single venue.

== Champions ==
Track events
Event	Men	Performance	Women	Performance
100 m	Carlo Vittori	10.9	Giusy Leone	12.4
200 m	Lucio Sangermano	21.8	Giusy Leone	25.6
400 m	Antonio Siddi	49.2		
800 m	Vittorio Maggioni	1:56.4	Loredana Simonetti	2:18.7 NR
1500 m	Vittorio Maggioni	3:58.8		
5000 m	Rino Lavelli	15:30.2		
10,000 m	Giacomo Peppicelli	32:22.8		
110/80 m hs	Ezio Nardelli	15.2	Milena Greppi	11.7
400 m hs	Armando Filiput	53.8		
Racewalk
10,000 m walk	Pino Dordoni	47:44:6		
Field events
High jump	Pierluigi Sara	1.84 m	Ester Palmesino	1.50 m
Pole vault	Giulio Chiesa	4.00 m		
Long jump	Gianpiero Druetto	7.11 m	Maria Gabriella Pinto	5.49 m
Triple jump	Alberto Guzzi	14.75 m		
Shot put	Angiolo Profeti	14.22 m	Amelia Piccinini	12.79 m
Discus throw	Adolfo Consolini	51.65 m	Edera Cordiale	39.09 m
Hammer throw	Teseo Taddia	53.33 m		
Javelin throw	Gian Luigi Farina	60.19 m	Ada Turci	39.64 m
