= Campaccio =

Annual cross country running competition in San Giorgio su Legnano, Italy

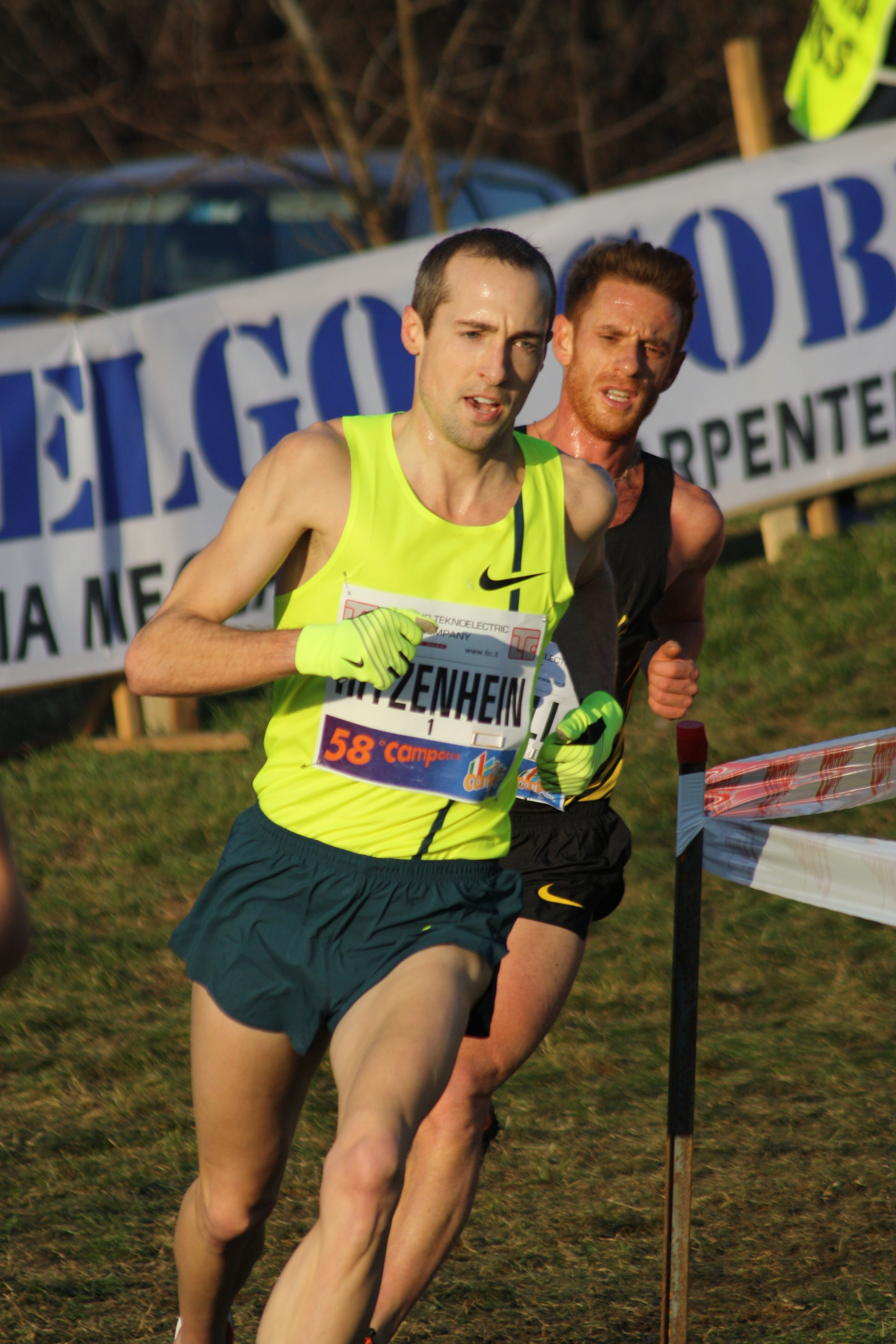
- Dathan Ritzenhein racing on the course in 2015
- Date: Early January
- Location: San Giorgio su Legnano, Italy
- Event type: Cross country
- Distance: 10 km for men 6 km for women
- Established: 1957
- Website: Campaccio
- Participants: 138 (2022); 110 (2021); 174 (2020); 163 (2019)

The Campaccio is an annual cross country running competition which takes place in early January in San Giorgio su Legnano, Italy. Organised by the Unione Sportiva Sangiorgese (Sangiorgese Sports Association), the event attracts participation from Olympic and world champions in athletics, in spite of the fact that the host town has a population of just over 6000. It is typically the first major athletics event of the year in Italy, and holds IAAF Cross Country Permit status.

== History ==
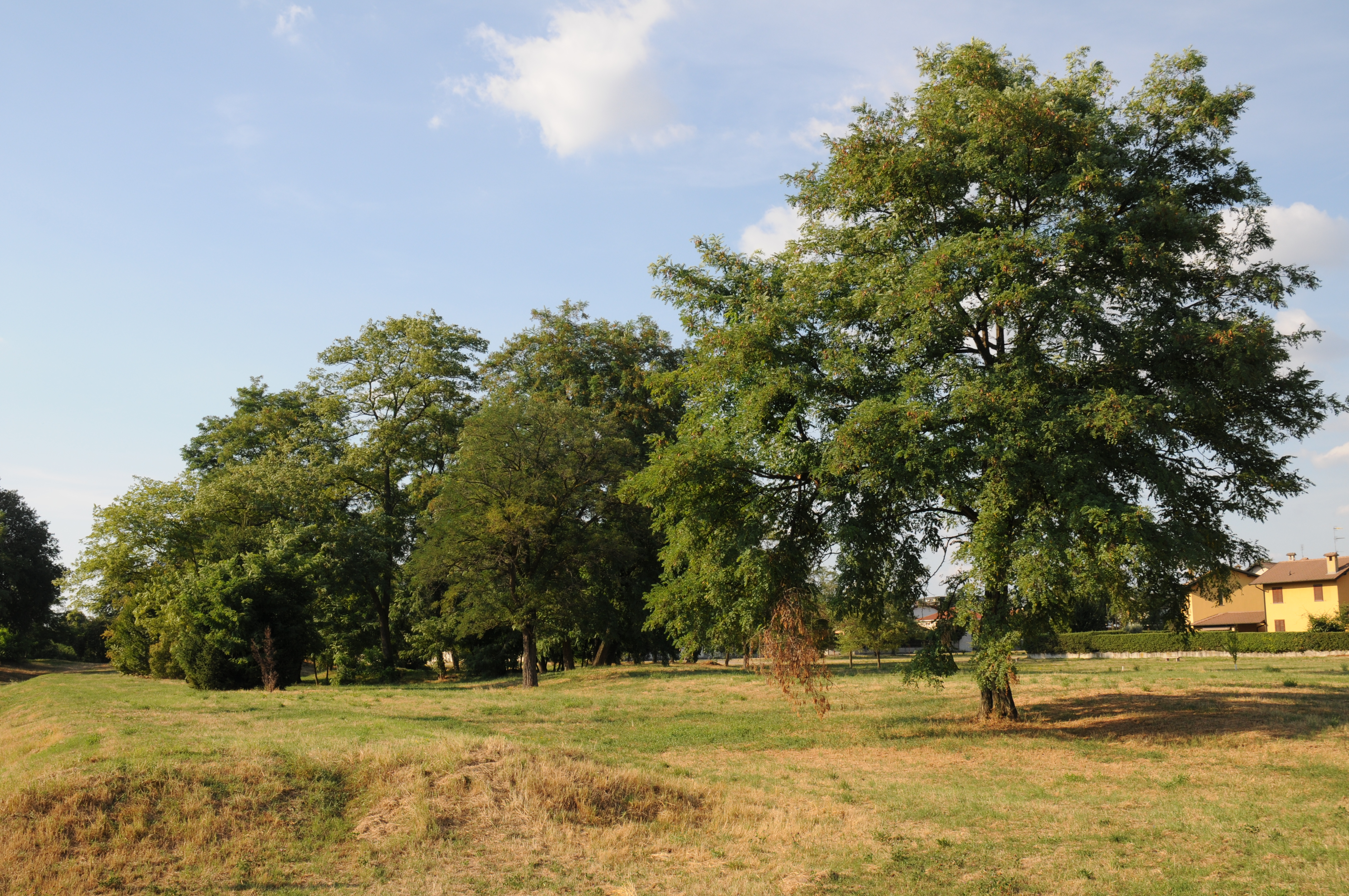
Trees on the race course in San Giorgio su Legnano

The event was first held in 1957 in a rough patch of farmland in the town and derives its name from the word "Campasc", which means "uncultivated field" in the local dialect. The Campaccio began as a men's only race, but expanded to include a men's junior race in 1961. The first women's race was held in 1970, with Paola Cacchi taking the inaugural honours, but it was not until 1975 that the women's contest became an annual fixture. The men's race was held over 12 kilometres for much of its history, but this was changed to a 10 km race in 2008. The women's race was initially around 3.5 km but settled on a 6 km format in the mid-1990s.

The competition has particular importance to Italian cross country runners as performances at the race, as well as the Italian national championships, often determine the national selection for the IAAF World Cross Country Championships. The organisers successfully bid to hold the 2006 European Cross Country Championships in San Giorgio su Legnano, which coincided with the 50th edition of the Campaccio cross country race. In celebration of the anniversary, prominent Italian athletics journalist Ennio Buongiovanni published a book documenting the event's history: Campaccio e Dintorni - 50 Anni Di Storia (Campaccio and its Setting – 50 Years of History). As a result of the continental championships (scheduled in mid-December), independent Campaccio races were not held in either 2006 or 2007.

The men's race often features the top Kenyan and Italian runners, while the women's elite race attracts a greater variety of nationalities, particularly Europeans. Past winners on the men's side include world champions Paul Tergat, Kenenisa Bekele, Haile Gebrselassie and Eliud Kipchoge. The women's race has been won by world champions Jackline Maranga, Ingrid Kristiansen and Grete Waitz, as well as prominent marathoners Uta Pippig and Paula Radcliffe. Some of Italy's best runners have taken victory at the Campaccio, such as steeplechase world champion Francesco Panetta, Olympic marathon winner Gelindo Bordin, Gabriella Dorio (1984 Olympic champion) and Olympic medallist Paola Pigni-Cacchi.

On 6 January 2025, during the 68th edition, the Olympic Silver Medalist of the 10.000m at the Paris 2024 Games, Nadia Battocletti, wins the women's race, marking the return of an Italian winner in the event for the first time after 31 years, when had triumphed Silvia Sommaggio.

== Past senior race winners ==
Key: Course record

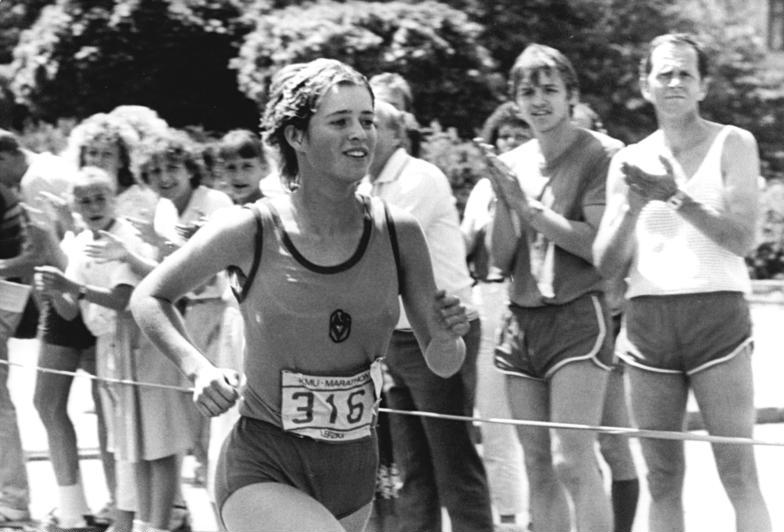
Three-time Boston Marathon winner Uta Pippig won in 1991.

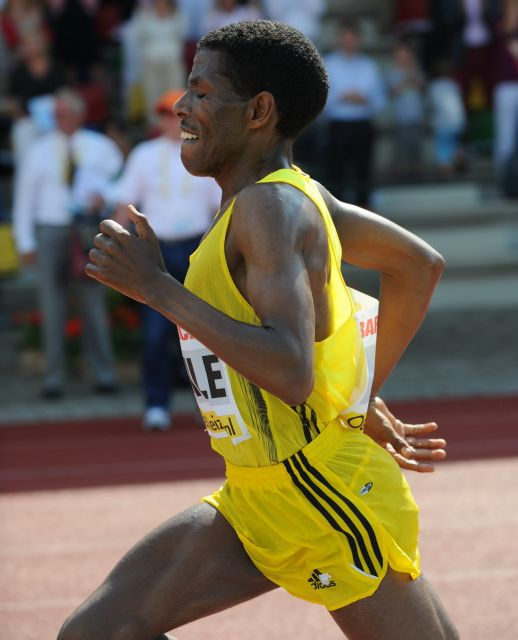
Multiple Olympic and world champion Haile Gebrselassie was the 1994 men's winner.

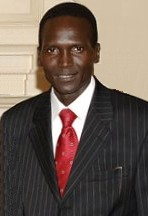
Paul Tergat won both the Campaccio and World Cross Championships in 1997.

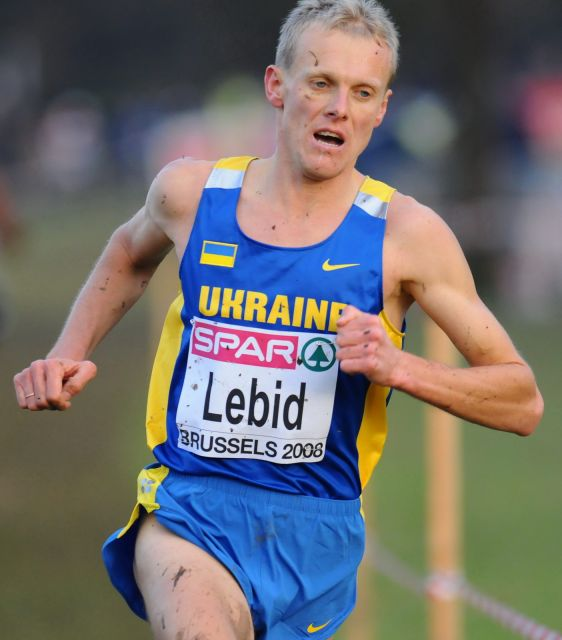
Nine-time European Cross winner Serhiy Lebid was victorious in both 2003 and 2005.

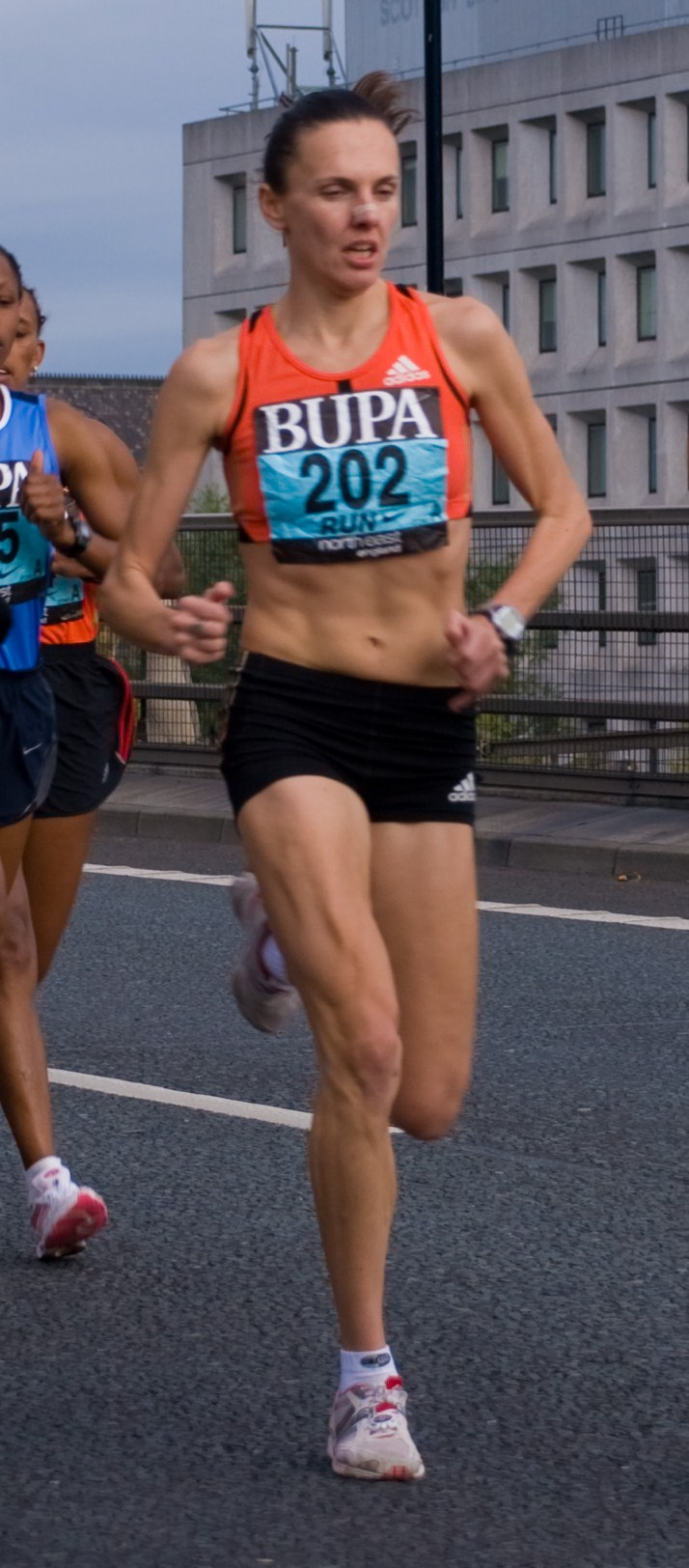
Hungarian Anikó Kálovics won three times consecutively from 2009 to 2011.

Edition	Year	Men's winner	Time (m:s)	Women's winner	Time (m:s)
1st	1957	Franco Volpi (ITA)	?	Not held	
2nd	1958	Riccardo Della Minola (ITA)	?	Not held	
3rd	1959	Giorgio Gandani (ITA)	?	Not held	
4th	1960	Giorgio Gandani (ITA)	?	Not held	
5th	1961	Luigi Conti (ITA)	?	Not held	
6th	1962	Franco Volpi (ITA)	?	Not held	
7th	1963	Antonio Ambu (ITA)	?	Not held	
8th	1964	Antonio Ambu (ITA)	?	Not held	
9th	1965	Nedjalko Farcic (SCG)	?	Not held	
10th	1966	Antonio Ambu (ITA)	?	Not held	
11th	1967	Antonio Ambu (ITA)	?	Not held	
12th	1968	Antonio Ambu (ITA)	?	Not held	
13th	1969	Nedjalko Farcic (SCG)	?	Not held	
14th	1970	Lutz Philipp (GER)	?	Paola Cacchi (ITA)	?
15th	1971	Wohib Masresha (ETH)	?	Not held	
16th	1972	Danijel Korica (SCG)	?	Not held	
17th	1973	Juan Hidalgo (ESP)	39:45	Not held	
18th	1974	Danijel Korica (SCG)	38:30	Not held	
19th	1975	Luigi Zarcone (ITA)	40:51	Margherita Gargano (ITA)	10:38
20th	1976	Franco Fava (ITA)	37:17	Gabriella Dorio (ITA)	14:24
21st	1977	Franco Fava (ITA)	36:11	Carmen Valero (ESP)	13:21
22nd	1978	Franco Fava (ITA)	35:06	Carmen Valero (ESP)	12:48.9
23rd	1979	Bronisław Malinowski (POL)	33:33.3	Margherita Gargano (ITA)	12:56
24th	1980	Venanzio Ortis (ITA)	37:26.9	Cristina Tomasini (ITA)	13:46.8
25th	1981	José Luis González (ESP)	33:11	Ingrid Kristiansen (NOR)	12:18
26th	1982	Venanzio Ortis (ITA)	?	Grete Waitz (NOR)	?
27th	1983	Léon Schots (BEL)	?	Ruth Smeeth (GBR)	?
28th	1984	Gelindo Bordin (ITA)	?	Ruth Smeeth (GBR)	?
29th	1985	Bogusław Mamiński (POL)	37:00	Corinne Debaets (BEL)	14:01
30th	1986	Francesco Panetta (ITA)	?	Cristina Tomasini (ITA)	?
31st	1987	Francesco Panetta (ITA)	?	Lieve Slegers (BEL)	?
32nd	1988	Gelindo Bordin (ITA)	33:55	Rosanna Munerotto (ITA)	14:08
33rd	1989	Francesco Panetta (ITA)	34:24.9	Maria Curatolo (ITA)	14:01.1
34th	1990	Francesco Panetta (ITA)	34:42	Nadia Dandolo (ITA)	16:19
35th	1991	Jonah Koech (KEN)	36:16	Uta Pippig (GER)	18:01
36th	1992	Stephenson Nyamu (KEN)	34:10	Rosanna Munerotto (ITA)	17:02
37th	1993	Francesco Panetta (ITA)	34:05	Rosanna Munerotto (ITA)	16:56
38th	1994	Haile Gebrselassie (ETH)	37:39	Silvia Sommaggio (ITA)	22:41
39th	1995	Fita Bayisa (ETH)	34:38	Merima Denboba (ETH)	20:28
40th	1996	Shem Kororia (KEN)	36:58	Florence Barsosio (KEN)	22:29
41st	1997	Paul Tergat (KEN)	36:15	Kutre Dulecha (ETH)	21:38
42nd	1998	Bernard Barmasai (KEN)	35:07	Jackline Maranga (KEN)	20:49
43rd	1999	Paul Koech (KEN)	34:24	Zahra Ouaziz (MAR)	20:09
44th	2000	Hillary Korir (KEN)	35:41	Florence Barsosio (KEN)	19:33
45th	2001	Paulo Guerra (POR)	36:38	Merima Denboba (ETH)	22:00
46th	2002	Kenenisa Bekele (ETH)	34:51	Paula Radcliffe (GBR)	21:03
47th	2003	Serhiy Lebid (UKR)	35:59	Helena Javornik (SLO)	21:23
48th	2004	Kenenisa Bekele (ETH)	34:36	Anikó Kálovics (HUN)	20:42
49th	2005	Serhiy Lebid (UKR)	36:10	Rita Jeptoo (KEN)	19:38
50th	2006	Held in conjunction with 2006 European Cross Country Championships			
—	2007	Not held			
51st	2008	Edwin Soi (KEN)	29:46	Kate Reed (GBR)	19:55
52nd	2009	Eliud Kipchoge (KEN)	29:54	Anikó Kálovics (HUN)	20:33
53rd	2010	Abreham Cherkos (ETH)	28:52	Anikó Kálovics (HUN)	20:17
54th	2011	Joseph Ebuya (KEN)	28:15	Anikó Kálovics (HUN)	20:04
55th	2012	Edwin Soi (KEN)	29:13	Mercy Cherono (KEN)	19:26
56th	2013	Muktar Edris (ETH)	28:42	Worknesh Degefa (ETH)	19:26
57th	2014	Albert Rop (BHR)	28:19	Hiwot Ayalew (ETH)	18:59
58th	2015	Dathan Ritzenhein (USA)	29:08	Janet Kisa (KEN)	19:00
59th	2016	Imane Merga (ETH)	28:50	Alice Aprot (KEN)	18:56
60th	2017	Muktar Edris (ETH)	28:54	Hellen Obiri (KEN)	18:32
61st	2018	James Kibet (KEN)	29:34	Lilian Rengeruk (KEN)	19:02
62nd	2019	Hagos Gebrhiwet (ETH)	29:18	Yasemin Can (TUR)	19:21
63rd	2020	Mogos Tuemay (ETH)	29:01	Fotyen Tesfay (ETH)	19:27
64th	2021	Jacob Kiplimo (UGA)	29:07	Lilian Kasait Rengeruk (KEN)	19:06
65th	2022	Addisu Yihune (ETH)	28:39	Dawit Seyaum (ETH)	18:48
66th	2023	Rodrigue Kwizera (BDI)	28:42	Rahel Daniel (ERI)	19:10
67th	2024	Daniel Ebenyo (KEN)	29:16	Francine Niyomukunzi (BDI)	19:42
68th	2025	Telahun Bekele (ETH)	31:32	Nadia Battocletti (ITA)	21:14
69th	2026	Egide Ntakarutimana (BDI)	30:38	Nadia Battocletti (ITA)	21:10

=== Winners by country ===
Country	Men's race	Women's race	Total
Italy	24	14	38
Kenya	12	10	22
Ethiopia	13	7	20
Great Britain	0	4	4
Hungary	0	4	4
Serbia and Montenegro	4	0	4
Spain	2	2	4
Belgium	1	2	3
Burundi	2	0	2
Germany	1	1	2
Norway	0	2	2
Poland	2	0	2
Ukraine	2	0	2
Bahrain	1	0	1
Uganda	1	0	1
Morocco	0	1	1
Portugal	1	0	1
Slovenia	0	1	1
United States	1	0	1
Turkey	0	1	1
Eritrea	0	1	1

== See also ==
- Cross della Vallagarina
- Cinque Mulini
- Trofeo Alasport
- History of San Giorgio su Legnano
