= Athletics at the 1979 Summer Universiade – Women's 1500 metres =

The women's 1500 metres event at the 1979 Summer Universiade was held at the Estadio Olimpico Universitario in Mexico City on 9 September 1979.

== Results ==
Rank	Athlete	Nationality	Time	Notes
1st place, gold medalist(s)	Natalia Mărăşescu	Romania	4:13.9	
2nd place, silver medalist(s)	Olga Dvirna	Soviet Union	4:14.5	
3rd place, bronze medalist(s)	Valentina Ilyinykh	Soviet Union	4:14.6	
4	Margherita Gargano	Italy	4:16.0	
5	Gabriella Dorio	Italy	4:18.0	
6	Fiţa Lovin	Romania	4:20.0	
7	Jan Merrill	United States	4:27.5	
8	Mercedes Calleja	Spain	4:36.7	
