= Trofeo Alasport =

Annual cross country running competition in Sardinia

- Date: March
- Location: Alà dei Sardi, Italy
- Event type: Cross country
- Distance: 11 kilometres (6.8 mi) for men 5.5 kilometres (3.4 mi) for women
- Established: 1973
- Website: Alasport

The Trofeo Alasport, also known as the Cross di Alà dei Sardi, is an annual cross country running competition which takes place in March in Alà dei Sardi on the Italian island of Sardinia. Unusually for a high-profile cross country event, it has often been held after the IAAF World Cross Country Championships which occurs in late March. The Trofeo Alasport is traditionally the final event of the cross country season in Italy.

The competition was initiated in 1973 by a local athletics enthusiast, Antonello Baltolu, and has been held on an annual basis since then by the local sports association, the Società Sportiva Alasport. It is one of the foremost competitions of its type in Italy, alongside the Cinque Mulini, and attracts international competitors of the highest calibre. Former winners of the event include numerous world cross country champions, such as Paul Tergat, John Ngugi, Kenenisa Bekele and Khalid Skah in the men's race, while Albertina Dias, Gete Wami and Jackline Maranga have won on the women's side.

The men's elite race is held over roughly 11 kilometres (6.8 mi) while the women's competition is half that distance at around 5.5 kilometres (3.4 mi). The Trofeo Alasport began as a domestic event but quickly took on an international nature, with British Olympian John Bicourt becoming the first foreign winner at the fourth edition. Belgium's Léon Schots was the first world champion to take victory in Alà dei Sardi in 1983. African names came to dominate the winner's lists from the 1990s onwards, with Susan Sirma of Kenya ushering in the change with back-to-back victories in 1991 and 1992. In addition to these elite level races, amateur competitions are also featured on the programme of the day's events, as well as number of shorter youth-level races.

The competition has been held every year with the exceptions of 1980 and a brief suspension of the event between 2005 and 2007. Since 1986, the Trofeo Alasport has also been designated as the Trofeo Presidente della Repubblica, an honorific in recognition from the President of Italy.

== Past elite race winners ==
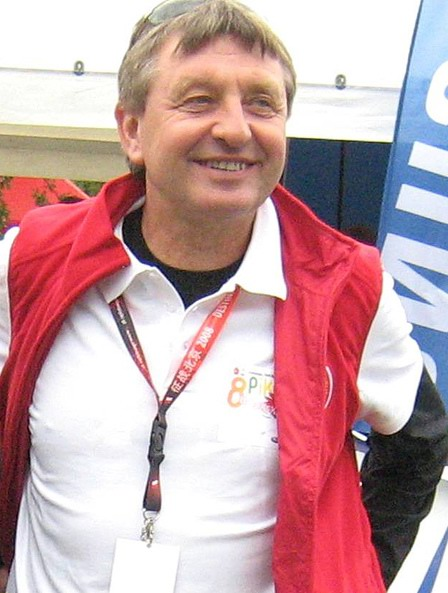
Bogusław Mamiński is a two-time race winner.

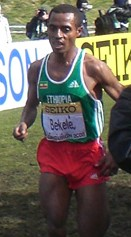
Kenenisa Bekele won in Alà dei Sardi in 2003 after winning a world cross country double

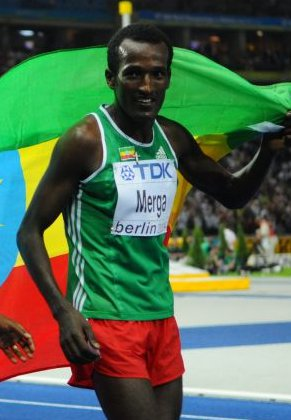
Imane Merga won in 2011 a few days after becoming the world champion.

Edition	Year	Men's winner	Time (m:s)	Women's winner	Time (m:s)
1st	1973	Vincenzo Chessa (ITA)	?	Caterina Corrò (ITA)	?
2nd	1974	Giovanni Flore (ITA)	?	Luisa Marci (ITA)	?
3rd	1975	Luigi Zarcone (ITA)	?	Margherita Gargano (ITA)	?
4th	1976	John Bicourt (GBR)	?	Cristina Tomasini (ITA)	?
5th	1977	Luigi Zarcone (ITA)	?	Margherita Gargano (ITA)	?
6th	1978	Franco Fava (ITA)	30:55.4	Margherita Gargano (ITA)	11:17.7
7th	1979	Bronisław Malinowski (POL)	31:02.0	Gabriella Dorio (ITA)	11:05.4
—	1980	Not held			
8th	1981	Bogusław Mamiński (POL)	29:55.3	Cristina Tomasini (ITA)	11:10.4
9th	1982	Venanzio Ortis (ITA)	?	Cristina Tomasini (ITA)	?
10th	1983	Léon Schots (BEL)	32:14.1	Cristina Tomasini (ITA)	11:54.1
11th	1984	Gerard Helme (GBR)	34:14.8	Alba Milana (ITA)	15:07.0
12th	1985	Bogusław Psujek (POL)	?	Kathy Carter-Binns (GBR)	?
13th	1986	Bogusław Mamiński (POL)	?	Cristina Tomasini (ITA)	?
14th	1987	Franco Boffi (ITA)	?	Jane Shields (GBR)	?
15th	1988	Eamonn Martin (GBR)	32:44.9	Angela Tooby (GBR)	14:43.5
16th	1989	Gary Staines (GBR)	32:37.1	Yvonne Murray (GBR)	14:23.0
17th	1990	Francesco Panetta (ITA)	31:15	Jeanne-Marie Pipoz (SUI)	13:45
18th	1991	Arturo Barrios (MEX)	31:15.0	Susan Sirma (KEN)	13:33.5
19th	1992	John Ngugi (KEN)	30:43.7	Susan Sirma (KEN)	13:48.7
20th	1993	Fita Bayisa (ETH)	30:24.9	Rosanna Munerotto (ITA)	16:58.1
21st	1994	Salah Hissou (MAR)	30:23.7	Albertina Dias (POR)	17:26.6
22nd	1995	Fita Bayisa (ETH)	30:28	Albertina Dias (POR)	17:18
23rd	1996	Khalid Skah (MAR)	32:26	Lidia Camberg (POL)	18:38
24th	1997	Salah Hissou (MAR)	30:57.8	Tegla Loroupe (KEN)	17:23.4
25th	1998	Paul Tergat (KEN)	32:25	Jackline Maranga (KEN)	18:14
26th	1999	Paul Kosgei (KEN)	30:39	Sarah Kavina (TAN)	18:02
27th	2000	Paul Kosgei (KEN)	30:19.6	Merima Denboba (ETH)	17:11.2
28th	2001	Paul Kosgei (KEN)	31:36.8	Gete Wami (ETH)	17:13.2
29th	2002	Richard Limo (KEN)	29:53.1	Merima Denboba (ETH)	16:53.2
30th	2003	Kenenisa Bekele (ETH)	31:55.9	Merima Denboba (ETH)	18:22.0
31st	2004	Eliud Kipchoge (KEN)	31:57	Meselech Melkamu (ETH)	18:03
Race not held 2005–2007
32nd	2008	Tariku Bekele (ETH)	32:05	Mestawet Tufa (ETH)	17:49
33rd	2009	Moses Mosop (KEN)	31:59.4	Florence Kiplagat (KEN)	17:33.5
34th	2010	Zersenay Tadese (ERI)	31:38	Sule Utura (ETH)	18:03
35th	2011	Imane Merga (ETH)	32:11	Sylvia Kibet (KEN)	18:02
36th	2012	John Kipkoech (KEN)	32:11	Priscah Cherono (KEN)	17:56

== See also ==
- Campaccio
- Cross della Vallagarina
