= 1976 IAAF World Cross Country Championships – Senior women's race =

Senior women's race at the 1976 IAAF World Cross Country Championships
- Organisers: IAAF
- Edition: 4th
- Date: February 28
- Host city: Chepstow, Wales
- Venue: Chepstow Racecourse
- Events: 1
- Distances: 4.8 km – Senior women
- Participation: 69 athletes from 12 nations

The Senior women's race at the 1976 IAAF World Cross Country Championships was held in Chepstow, Wales, at the Chepstow Racecourse on February 28, 1976. A report on the event was given in the Glasgow Herald.

Complete results, medallists, and the results of British athletes were published.

== Race results ==
=== Senior women's race (4.8 km) ===
==== Individual ====
Rank	Athlete	Country	Time
1st place, gold medalist(s)	Carmen Valero	Spain	16:19.4
2nd place, silver medalist(s)	Tatyana Kazankina	Soviet Union	16:39
3rd place, bronze medalist(s)	Gabriella Dorio	Italy	16:56
4	Ann Yeoman	England	16:57
5	Renata Pentlinowska	Poland	17:00
6	Joëlle De Brouwer	France	17:01
7	Lynn Bjorklund	United States	17:02
8	Giana Romanova	Soviet Union	17:03
9	Mary Stewart	Scotland	17:04
10	Margherita Gargano	Italy	17:05
11	Tatyana Galstyan	Soviet Union	17:06
12	Raisa Katyukova	Soviet Union	17:07
13	Viviane van Emelen	Belgium	17:09
14	Deirdre Foreman	Ireland	17:10
15	Silvana Cruciata	Italy	17:11
16	Glynis Penny	England	17:18
17	Doris Heritage	United States	17:19
18	Nadine Claes	Belgium	17:20
19	Debbie Quatier	United States	17:21
20	Celina Magala	Poland	17:23
21	Judy Graham	United States	17:24
22	Mary Purcell	Ireland	17:25
23	Christine Haskett	Scotland	17:27
24	Peggy Neppel	United States	17:27
25	Monika Gaisjier	Poland	17:28
26	Carol Gould	England	17:29
27	Aila Virkberg	Finland	17:30
28	Christine Iceaga	France	17:30
29	Olga Dvirna	Soviet Union	17:31
30	Chantal Navarro	France	17:32
31	Cristina Tomasini	Italy	17:32
32	Thelwyn Bateman	England	17:36
33	Sinikka Tyynelä	Finland	17:39
34	Alison Blake	England	17:39
35	Marjukka Ahtiainen	Finland	17:40
36	Encarnación Escudero	Spain	17:40
37	Zofia Kolakowska	Poland	17:41
38	Cheryl Bridges	United States	17:42
39	Marleen Mols	Belgium	17:47
40	Sheelagh Morrissey	Ireland	17:51
41	Moire O'Boyle	Scotland	17:54
42	Taina Syrjälä	Finland	17:58
43	Joëlle Audibert	France	18:00
44	Montserrat Abello	Spain	18:00
45	Valerie Rowe	England	18:05
46	Veronica Duffy	Ireland	18:10
47	Françoise Nicolas	France	18:11
48	Belen Azpeitia	Spain	18:14
49	Helena Pietilä	Finland	18:14
50	Magda Ilands	Belgium	18:15
51	Urszula Prasek	Poland	18:18
52	Jean Lochhead	Wales	18:29
53	Agnesista Duplica	Poland	18:30
54	Margaret Coomber	Scotland	18:30
55	Iciar Martinez	Spain	18:31
56	Marian Stanton	Ireland	18:31
57	Sonia Basso	Italy	18:32
58	Christine Malone	Ireland	18:38
59	Marcelina Hernaiz	Spain	18:58
60	Ann Parker	Scotland	19:02
61	Mary Chambers	Scotland	19:09
62	Anne Morris	Wales	19:11
63	Bernadette van Roy	Belgium	19:12
64	Maria Steels	Belgium	19:12
65	Viviane Croisé	France	19:13
66	Bronwen Smith	Wales	19:39
67	Anna James	Wales	19:42
68	Margaret Morgan	Wales	20:09
69	Ann Roblin	Wales	20:21

==== Teams ====
Rank	Team	Points
1st place, gold medalist(s)	Soviet Union: Tatyana Kazankina / 2; Giana Romanova / 8; Tatyana Galstyan / 11; Raisa Katyukova / 12; (Olga Dvirna) / (29)	33
2nd place, silver medalist(s)	Italy: Gabriella Dorio / 3; Margherita Gargano / 10; Silvana Cruciata / 15; Cristina Tomasini / 31; (Sonia Basso) / (57)	59
3rd place, bronze medalist(s)	United States: Lynn Bjorklund / 7; Doris Heritage / 17; Debbie Quatier / 19; Judy Graham / 21; (Peggy Neppel) / (24); (Cheryl Bridges) / (38)	64
4	England: Ann Yeoman / 4; Glynis Penny / 16; Carol Gould / 26; Thelwyn Bateman / 32; (Alison Blake) / (34); (Valerie Rowe) / (45)	78
5	Poland: Renata Pentlinowska / 5; Celina Magala / 20; Monika Gaisjier / 25; Zofia Kolakowska / 37; (Urszula Prasek) / (51); (Agnesista Duplica) / (53)	87
6	France: Joëlle De Brouwer / 6; Christine Iceaga / 28; Chantal Navarro / 30; Joëlle Audibert / 43; (Françoise Nicolas) / (47); (Viviane Croisé) / (65)	107
7	Belgium: Viviane van Emelen / 13; Nadine Claes / 18; Marleen Mols / 39; Magda Ilands / 50; (Bernadette van Roy) / (63); (Maria Steels) / (64)	120
8	Ireland: Deirdre Foreman / 14; Mary Purcell / 22; Sheelagh Morrissey / 40; Veronica Duffy / 46; (Marian Stanton) / (56); (Christine Malone) / (58)	122
9	Scotland: Mary Stewart / 9; Christine Haskett / 23; Moire O'Boyle / 41; Margaret Coomber / 54; (Ann Parker) / (60); (Mary Chambers) / (61)	127
10	Spain: Carmen Valero / 1; Encarnación Escudero / 36; Montserrat Abello / 44; Belen Azpeitia / 48; (Iciar Martinez) / (55); (Marcelina Hernaiz) / (59)	129
11	Finland: Aila Virkberg / 27; Sinikka Tyynelä / 33; Marjukka Ahtiainen / 35; Taina Syrjälä / 42; (Helena Pietilä) / (49)	137
12	Wales: Jean Lochhead / 52; Anne Morris / 62; Bronwen Smith / 66; Anna James / 67; (Margaret Morgan) / (68); (Ann Roblin) / (69)	247

- Note: Athletes in parentheses did not score for the team result

== Participation ==
An unofficial count yields the participation of 69 athletes from 12 countries in the Senior women's race. This is in agreement with the official numbers as published.

- Belgium (6)
- England (6)
- Finland (5)
- France (6)
- Ireland (6)
- Italy (5)
- Poland (6)
- Scotland (6)
- Soviet Union (5)
- Spain (6)
- United States (6)
- Wales (6)

== See also ==
- 1976 IAAF World Cross Country Championships – Senior men's race
- 1976 IAAF World Cross Country Championships – Junior men's race
