= Athletics at the 1975 Summer Universiade – Women's 3000 metres =

The women's 3000 metres event at the 1975 Summer Universiade was held at the Stadio Olimpico in Rome on 18 September. It was the first time that an event this long was held for women at the Universiade.

== Results ==
Rank	Athlete	Nationality	Time	Notes
1st place, gold medalist(s)	Natalia Andrei	Romania	8:54.09	
2nd place, silver medalist(s)	Thelma Wright	Canada	8:54.94	
3rd place, bronze medalist(s)	Svetlana Ulmasova	Soviet Union	8:55.88	
4	Raisa Smekhnova	Soviet Union	9:00.62	
5	Bronisława Ludwichowska	Poland	9:04.86	
6	Margherita Gargano	Italy	9:11.08	
7	Ellen Wessinghage	West Germany	9:15.14	
8	Silvana Cruciata	Italy	9:16.98	
9	Christine Benning	Great Britain	9:48.21	
10	Borbala Török	Hungary	10:12.29	
