= Cross della Vallagarina =

Annual cross country running competition in Rovereto, Italy

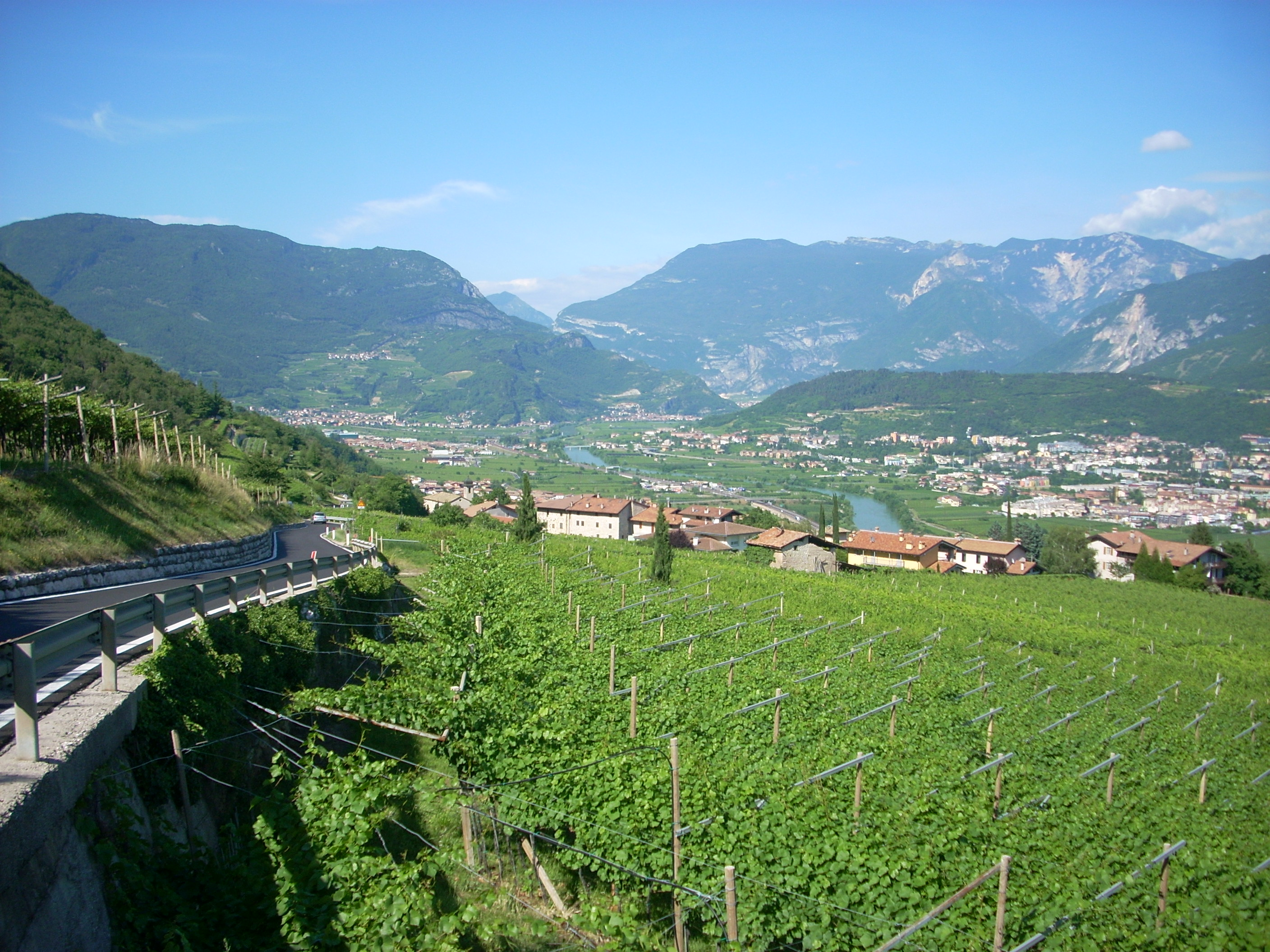
- The race is held in the valley around the city of Rovereto
- Date: Mid-January
- Location: Villa Lagarina - Rovereto, Italy
- Event type: Cross country
- Distance: 8.2 km for men 5.2 km for women
- Established: 1978
- Website: Cross della Vallagarina
- Participants: 50 (2020); 44 (2019)

The Cross della Vallagarina is an annual cross country running competition that is held in mid-January in Rovereto, Italy. The competition derives its name from the Vallagarina valley in which the city is located. It was first held in 1978 following the success of local runner Cristina Tomasini at the 1977 IAAF World Cross Country Championships. She was the inaugural winner of the Cross della Vallagarina, which was unusual in being a women's competition only – the men's race was added later in 1981.

The Cross della Vallagarina is part of the European Athletics permit meeting series, and has also previously been part of the Italian national circuit. It hosted the Italian Cross Country Championships in 2005 and 2007. The race is organised by the local sports club U.S. Quercia Rovereto, which also hosts the city's annual track and field meeting (Palio Città della Quercia) and Giro Podistico di Rovereto road race.

The current elite men's and women's races are held over 8.8 km and 5.5 km, respectively. The women's competition in 1978 began as a contest over 5 km and has remained roughly this distance throughout its history, except for a brief period where it was extended from 2005 to 2007. The men's race started as an 8 km event, but it has been mostly between 9–10 km for the majority of editions. The competition's looped course features a number of uphill and downhill sections along the valley's edge, making it a difficult race for some athletes. In addition to the elite level races, there are also several races for fun runners and amateurs, ranging from youth competitions to races for masters athletes.

Past winners of the event include some of Italy's most successful runners, including Olympic marathon champion Gelindo Bordin, 1987 World Champion Francesco Panetta, Gabriella Dorio (Olympic gold medallist in the 1500 m) and two-time 5000 m global medallist Roberta Brunet. Foreign winners of the event include multiple European Cross champion Serhiy Lebid, world steeplechase champions Wilson Boit Kipketer and Dorcus Inzikuru, and World Half Marathon champion Wilson Kiprop.

== Past senior race winners ==
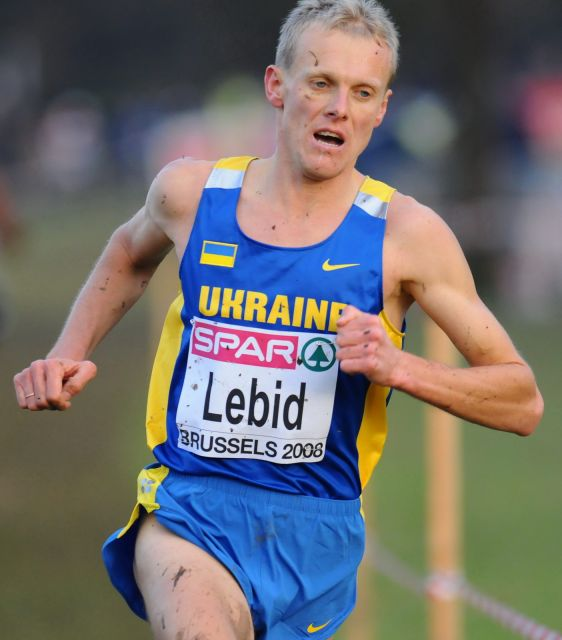
Multiple European champion Serhiy Lebid had back-to-back wins in 2003–04.

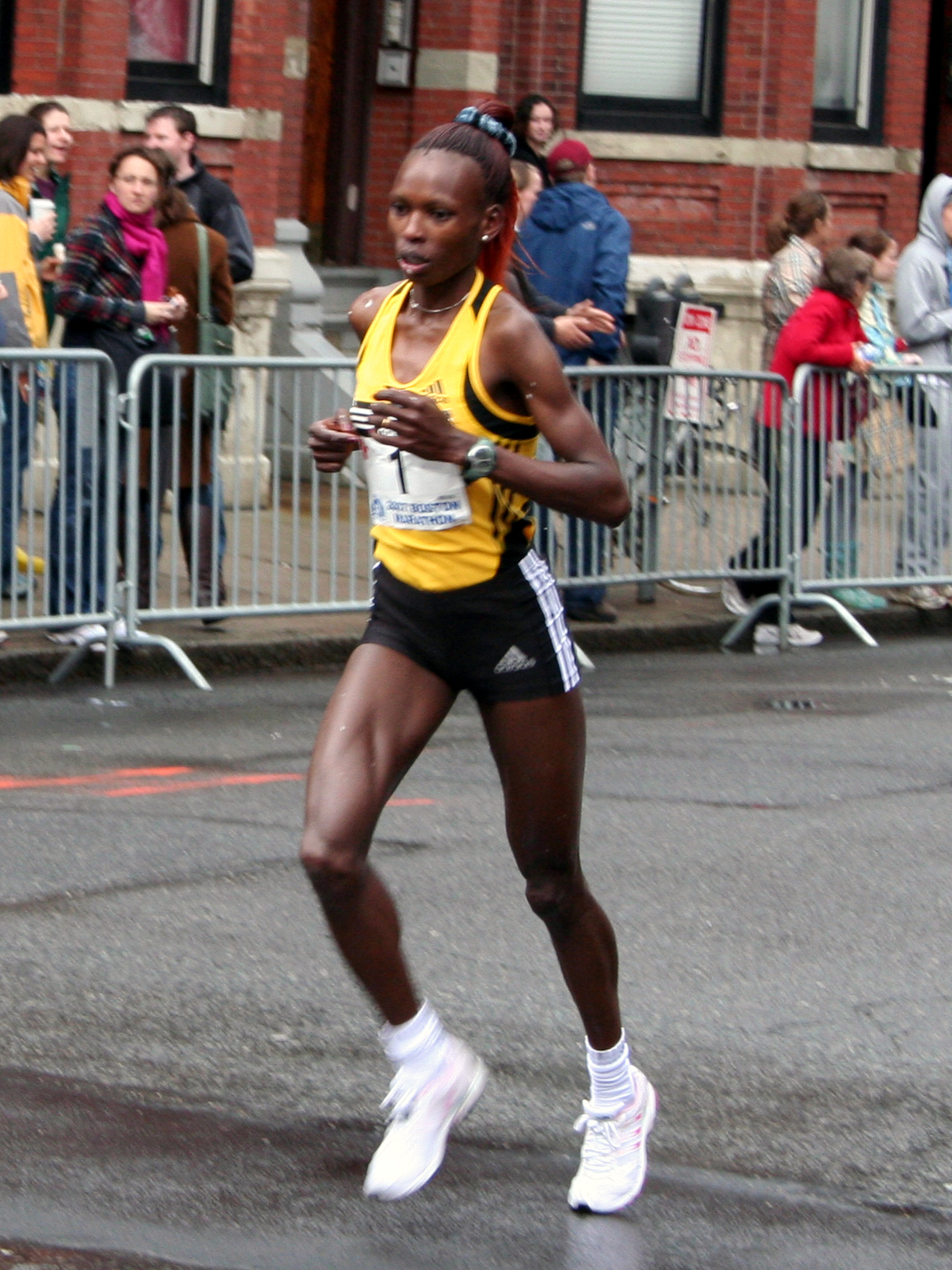
Rita Jeptoo, the 2006 winner, also won the Boston Marathon that year.

Key: National championship race

Edition	Year	Men's winner	Time (m:s)	Women's winner	Time (m:s)
1st	1978	Not held		Cristina Tomasini (ITA)	17:37.0
2nd	1979	Not held		Agnese Possamai (ITA)	?
3rd	1980	Not held		Cristina Tomasini (ITA)	16:08.5
4th	1981	Albert Rungger (ITA)	25:25.1	Agnese Possamai (ITA)	15:14.5
5th	1982	Gelindo Bordin (ITA)	25:32	Cristina Tomasini (ITA)	16:16.5
6th	1983	Mariano Scartezzini (ITA)	26:39.5	Gabriella Dorio (ITA)	17:10.6
7th	1984	Sergio Pesavento (ITA)	25:59.2	Wilma Rusman (NED)	16:10.0
8th	1985	Gelindo Bordin (ITA)	25:36.2	Wilma Rusman (NED)	16:43.0
9th	1986	Gianni Demadonna (ITA)	25:24.0	Maria Curatolo (ITA)	15:35.0
10th	1987	Francesco Panetta (ITA)	?	Flavia Furlan (ITA)	?
11th	1988	Marco Gozzano (ITA)	28:07.5	Rosanna Munerotto (ITA)	15:42.9
12th	1989	Francesco Panetta (ITA)	27:54.9	Maria Curatolo (ITA)	15:04.9
13th	1990	Francesco Panetta (ITA)	28:25.9	Nadia Dandolo (ITA)	15:46.7
14th	1991	Stephenson Nyamu (KEN)	27:41.0	Nives Curti (ITA)	15:18.0
15th	1992	Jonah Koech (KEN)	28:28.9	Nadia Dandolo (ITA)	15:40.9
16th	1993	Francesco Panetta (ITA)	28:04.6	Valentina Tauceri (ITA)	16:02.3
17th	1994	Richard Kosgei (KEN)	29:10	Roberta Brunet (ITA)	16:14
18th	1995	Umberto Pusterla (ITA)	29:18	Cristina Misaros (ROM)	16:26
19th	1996	Angelo Carosi (ITA)	28:37	Florence Barsosio (KEN)	15:40
20th	1997	Mark Bett (KEN)	28:22	Nadia Dandolo (ITA)	15:22
21st	1998	Umberto Pusterla (ITA)	28:43	Elisa Rea (ITA)	15:48
22nd	1999	Wilson Kipketer (KEN)	27:38	Sabrina Varrone (ITA)	15:02
23rd	2000	Paul Kosgei (KEN)	28:00.1	Valentina Tauceri (ITA)	15:47.3
24th	2001	Paul Kosgei (KEN)	27:57.3	Merima Denboba (ETH)	15:04.3
25th	2002	David Makori (KEN)	29:58.1	Rita Jeptoo (KEN)	17:29.5
26th	2003	Serhiy Lebid (UKR)	26:44.4	Dorcus Inzikuru (UGA)	5:27.0
27th	2004	Serhiy Lebid (UKR)	29:24.3	Anikó Kálovics (HUN)	19:02.7
28th	2005	Maurizio Leone (ITA)	35:52	Patrizia Tisi (ITA)	27:07
29th	2006	Eliud Kirui (KEN)	28:37.1	Priscah Cherono (KEN)	22:02
30th	2007	Giuliano Battocletti (ITA)	30:44	Renate Rungger (ITA)	27:07
31st	2008	Wilson Kiprop (KEN)	26:11.5	Catherine Kurui (KEN)	19:26.3
32nd	2009	Wilson Kiprop (KEN)	25:25.1	Federica Dal Ri (ITA)	19:17.1
33rd	2010	Lema Abera (ETH)	25:52	Asmerawork Bekele (ETH)	18:37
34th	2011	Thomas Longosiwa (KEN)	26:06.6	Birtukan Fente (ETH)	18:58.4
35th	2012	Kinde Atanau (ETH)	25:27	Afera Godfay (ETH)	19:16
36th	2013	Muktar Edris (ETH)	26:43	Silvia La Barbera (ITA)	22:44
37th	2014	Robert Ndiwa (KEN)	27:00	Linah Cheruto (KEN)	21:40
38th	2015	Andrew Kwemoi (KEN)	27:07	Silvia La Barbera (ITA)	22:48
39th	2016	Rodgers Maiyo (KEN)	26:39	Alemitu Hawi (ETH)	21:35
40th	2017	Robert Ndiwa (KEN)	27:21	Sara Dossena (ITA)	22:24
41st	2018	Telahun Bekele (ETH)	26:58	Norah Jeruto (KEN)	21:05
42nd	2019	Telahun Bekele (ETH)	26:12	Moira Stewartová (CZE)	22:41
43rd	2020	Cesare Maestri (ITA)	28:01	Moira Stewartová (CZE)	18:27
—	2021	Did not held			
44th	2022	Tadese Takele (ETH)	27:08	Klara Lukan (SLO)	17:47
45th	2023	Egide Ntakarutimana (BDI)	27:27	Francine Niyomukunzi (BDI)	17:41
46th	2024	Ibrahim Ezzaydouni (ESP)	27:49	Francine Niyomukunzi (BDI)	17:35
47th	2025	Célestin Ndikumana (BDI)	25:08	Ruken Tek (TUR)	19:00
48th	2026	Enrico Vecchi (ITA)	26:07	Emily Collinge (GBR)	19:02

== See also ==
- Cinque Mulini
- Trofeo Alasport
