= 1938 Italian Athletics Championships =

Edition of the Italian Athletics Championships

- Dates: 23–24 July
- Host city: Bologna
- Venue: Stadio Dallara
- Level: Senior
- Events: 34 (24 men, 10 women)

The 1938 Italian Athletics Championships was the 27th edition of the Italian Athletics Championships and were held in Bologna (main event) from 23 to 24 July.

== Champions ==
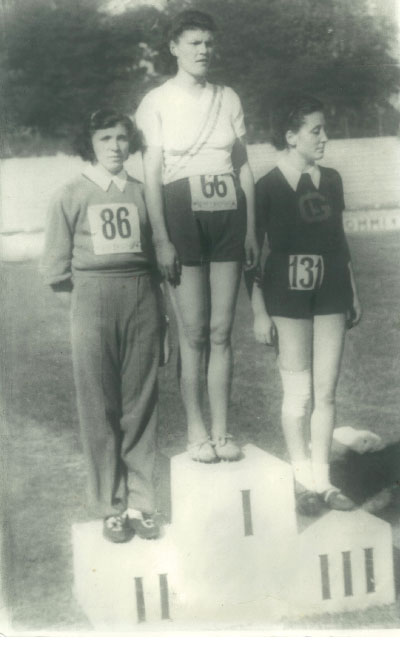
The podium of the women's shot put. From left Amelia Piccinini (2nd), Giorgina Grossi (winner) and Paola Risso (3rd).

Full results.

Track events
Event	Men	Performance	Women	Performance
100 m	Orazio Mariani	10.7	Maria Alfero	12.7
200 m	Tullio Gonnelli	22.4	Ida Penzo	26.7
400 m	Angelo Ferrario	49.9		
800 m	Mario Lanzi	1:50.7	Leandrina Bulzacchi	2:28.3
1500 m	Luigi Beccali	3:56.6		
5000 m	Giuseppe Beviacqua	15:04.4		
10,000 m	Giuseppe Lippi	32.25.0		
110/80 m hs	Gianni Caldana	15.3	Claudia Testoni	11.7
400 m hs	Luigi Facelli	55.6		
3000 m st	Ferdinando Migliaccio	9:40.6		
10,000 m walk	Luiigi Peri	48:18:8		
Field events
High jump	Renato Dotti	1.92 m	Modesta Puhar	1.51 m
Pole vault	Mario Romeo	4.03 m		
Long jump	Arturo Maffei	7.27 m	Claudia Testoni	5.53 m
Triple jump	Mario Taddia	14.14 m		
Shot put	Angiolo Profeti	14.46 m	Giorgina Grossi	11.14 m
Discus throw	Giorgio Oberweger	47.74 m	Guida Serafini	35.07 m
Hammer throw	Giovanni Cantagalli	46.33 m		
Javelin throw	Bruno Testa	61.25 m	Caterina Milanesio	32.55 m
Combined
Decathlon/Pentathlon	Eugenio Gasti	6001 pts		
Road events
Half marathon (25 km)	Umberto De Florentiis	1:27:53.4		
Marathon	Francesco Roccati	2:41:26.6		
50 km walk	Cosimo Puttilli	4:39:57.0		
Cross country
Cross (15 km/1.2 km)	Giuseppe Lippi	51:04	Leandrina Bulzacchi	...
