= Silvana Cruciata =

Italian long-distance runner (born 1953)

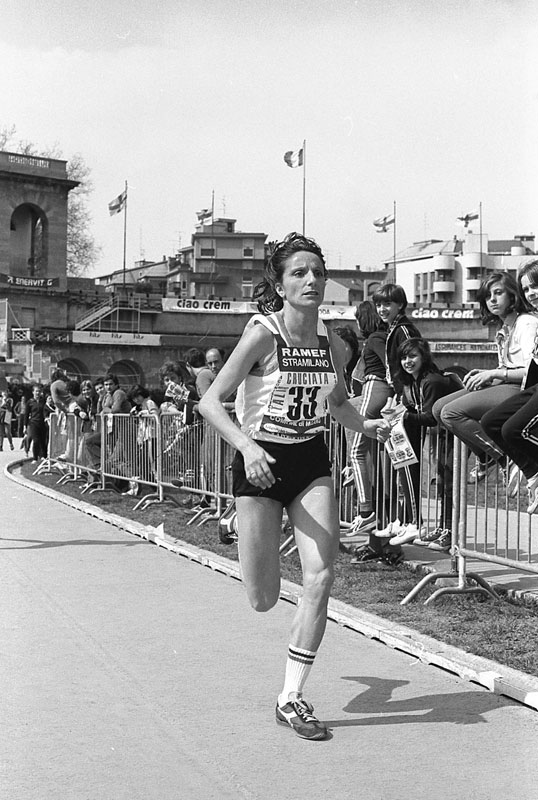

Personal information
- National team: Italy
- Born: 15 February 1953 (age 73) Naples, Italy
- Height: 1.68 m (5 ft 6 in)
- Weight: 52 kg (115 lb)

Sport
- Country: Italy
- Sport: Athletics
- Events: Middle-distance running; Long-distance running; Cross country running

Achievements and titles
- Personal best: 1500 m: 4:03.88 (1981)
Medal record
IAAF World Cup
Bronze medal – third place	1981 Rome	3000 m
World Cross Country Championships
Silver medal – second place	1974 Monza	Team race
Silver medal – second place	1976 Chepstow	Team race
Bronze medal – third place	1981 Madrid	Team race

Silvana Cruciata (born 15 February 1953) is a former Italian middle- and long-distance runner. She represented Italy at the 1976 Montreal Olympics and shared medals with the Italian women's teams at the IAAF World Cross Country Championships. Her best of 18.084 km for the one hour run set in 1981 was a world record for over seventeen years.

Among her other achievements were wins at the Rome-Ostia Half Marathon and Stramilano road races and a bronze medal over 3000 metres at the 1981 IAAF World Cup.

== Biography ==
She began her career as a cross country runner and was part of the silver medal-winning team in the long race at the 1974 IAAF World Cross Country Championships, alongside race winner Paola Pigni and Margherita Gargano. She won a second team silver at the 1976 IAAF World Cross Country Championships with a team of Gabriella Dorio, and Cristina Tomasini. She came 29th at the 1981 IAAF World Cross Country Championships, but this finish was enough to help the Italian women to the team bronze.

Cruciata represented Italy in the 1500 metres at the 1974 European Athletics Championships, but was eliminated in the heats. She made her only Olympic appearance at the 1976 Summer Olympics in Montreal, and was again knocked out in the heats stage of the 1500 m. She was fifth in the final over 1500 m at the 1978 European Athletics Indoor Championships. She won a number of national titles in this period, taking the 3000 metres Italian title in 1975, a 3000 m/1500 m indoor double in 1978, and both the 3000 m and marathon titles in 1981. She was the bronze medallist over 3000 m at the 1981 IAAF World Cup.

Cruiciata broke world records for the women's one hour run in 1980 and 1981 – she managed a distance of 17.563 km in Milan in 1980 and improved upon this with a distance of 18.084 km in Rome the following year (also setting a best time of 49:44 minutes for the 15,000 m track run). Her hour run record was a long-standing achievement and the mark went unbeaten until 1998 when Kenyan Tegla Loroupe broke the record. Cruciata's performance remains the best ever by a European, as well as being the Italian national record. She also ran a career best of 4:24.6 minutes for the mile at the DN Galan that year and this remains the stadium record for the event.

She also focused on road running events in her later career. She took three straight victories at the Stramilano Half Marathon from 1976 to 1978, and took a fourth win in 1981. Her performances of 1:22:05 hours in 1977 and 1:18:44 hours in 1978 were world's best performances for women over the distance. She had her first wins over the marathon at the Monza Marathon in 1976 and 1977, but her career best came in 1980 at the San Silvestro Marathon in Rome, where her time of 2:44:31 was a course record. In 1981 she won the Maratonina dei tre comuni, Rome-Ostia Half Marathon and the Amatrice-Configno race. She had a consecutive victory at the Tre Comuni in 1982 and won the Rome-Ostia competition for a second time in 1984.

== Achievements ==
Year	Competition	Venue	Position	Event	Time	Notes
1976	Olympic Games	(Canada) Montreal	Heat	1500 m	4:16.78	
1978	European Indoor Championships	(Italy) Milan	5th	1500 m	4:12.5	
1981	World Cup	(Italy) Rome	3rd	3000 m	8:57.10	

== National titles ==
She won five national championships at individual senior level.

- Italian Athletics Championships
  - 3000 m: 1975, 1978, 1981
  - Marathon: 1981
- Italian Athletics Indoor Championships
  - 1500 m: 1978

== See also ==
- Italian team at the running events
- Italy at the IAAF World Cup
