= Nicole Reina =

Italian middle-distance runner

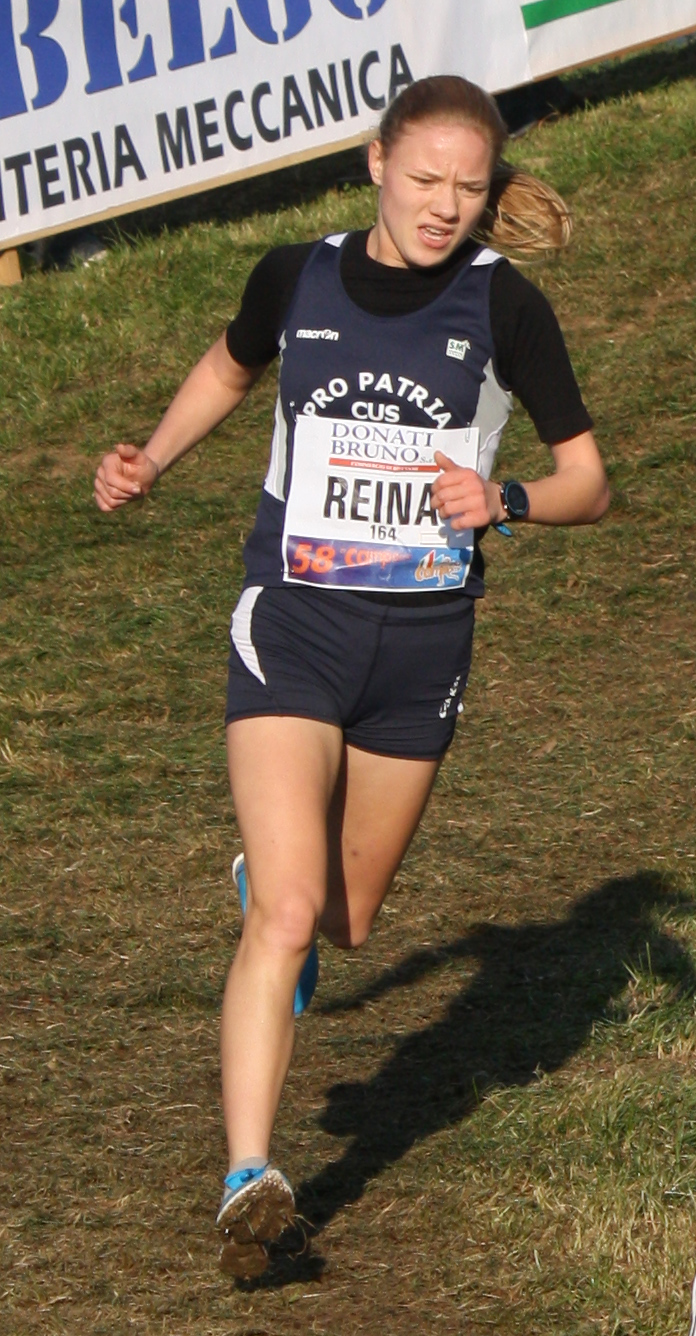
- Reina at Campaccio 2015.

Personal information
- Full name: Nicole Svetlana Reina
- National team: Italy
- Born: 25 September 1997 (age 28) Merefa, Ukraine
- Height: 1.63 m (5 ft 4 in)
- Weight: 45 kg (99 lb)

Sport
- Sport: Athletics
- Events: Middle-distance running; Steeplechase; Cross-country running
- Club: Cus Pro Patria Milano
- Coached by: Giorgio Rondelli

Achievements and titles
- Personal bests: 3000 m st: 10:12.91 (2014); 5000 m: 16:11.12 (2020)
Medal record
Europesan U20 Championships
Gold medal – first place	2018 Jesolo	10,000 m

Nicole Reina (born 25 September 1997) is a Ukrainian-born Italian female middle-distance runner and cross-country runner, two-time national champion at senior level.

== National titles ==
- Italian Athletics Championships
  - 3000 m steeplechase: 2013
- Italian Cross Country Championships
  - Short race: 2021
