= Franco Volpi (runner) =

Italian former long-distance runner

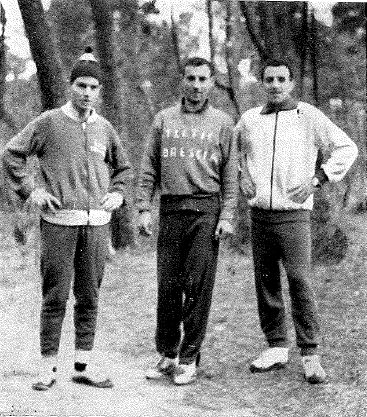
- Volpi (center) with Antonio Ambu (left) and Luigi Conti (right) in Viareggio in 1964.

Personal information
- Nickname: Poiana
- National team: Italy: 8 (1956-1960)
- Born: Enzo Volpi; 16 August 1936 Brescia, Italy
- Died: 14 March 2013 (aged 76) Brescia, Italy

Sport
- Sport: Athletics
- Event: Long-distance running
- Club: Gnutti Lumezzane; C.S. Esercito; Atletica Brescia

Achievements and titles
- Personal best: 3000 m: 8:20.0 (1960)

Enzo "Franco" Volpi (16 August 1936 - 14 March 2013) was an Italian long-distance runner.

He was also the coach of the New York City Marathon past winner Gianni Poli.

== Career ==
Five-time national champion at senior level in three different specialities from 1956 to 1960, boasts 8 caps in the Italy national athletics team.

He was national recordman in 5000 m and 10,000 m.

== National records ==
- 5000 m: 14:31.0 ( (Italy) Bari, 17 October 1957) - holder until 5 June 1958
- 10,000 m: 30:05.8 ( (Italy) Rome, 13 September 1957) - holder until 25 September 1960

== Achievements ==
He won two times the senior race at the important cross country running International competition Campaccio, held every in San Giorgio su Legnano, Italy from 1957. He won the first edition and a second time five years later.

- Campaccio
  - Senior race: 1957, 1962

== National titles ==
Volpi won five national championships at individual senior level.

- Italian Athletics Championships
  - 10,000 m: 1956, 1959
  - 3000 m steeplechase: 1960
- Italian Cross Country Championships
  - Long course: 1957, 1960
