= 1976 IAAF World Cross Country Championships =

- Organisers: IAAF
- Edition: 4th
- Date: 28 February
- Host city: Chepstow, Wales
- Venue: Chepstow Racecourse
- Events: 3
- Distances: 12 km – Senior men 7.8 km – Junior men 4.8 km – Senior women
- Participation: 306 athletes from 21 nations

The 1976 IAAF World Cross Country Championships was held in Chepstow, Wales, at the Chepstow Racecourse on 28 February 1976. A report on the event was given in the Glasgow Herald.

Complete results for men, junior men, women, medallists, and the results of British athletes were published.

== Medallists ==
Event	Gold		Silver		Bronze	
Individual
Senior men (12 km)	Carlos Lopes; Portugal	34:47.8	Tony Simmons; England	35:04	Bernie Ford; England	35:07
Junior men (7.8 km)	Eric Hulst; United States	23:53.8	Thom Hunt; United States	24:06.8	Nat Muir; Scotland	24:17
Senior women (4.8 km)	Carmen Valero; Spain	16:19.4	Tatyana Kazankina; Soviet Union	16:39	Gabriella Dorio; Italy	16:56
Team
Senior men	England	90	Belgium	118	France	187
Junior men	United States	16	Spain	60	England	91
Senior women	Soviet Union	33	Italy	59	United States	64

== Race results ==
=== Senior men's race (12 km) ===
Individual race
Rank	Athlete	Country	Time
1st place, gold medalist(s)	Carlos Lopes	Portugal	34:47.8
2nd place, silver medalist(s)	Tony Simmons	England	35:04
3rd place, bronze medalist(s)	Bernie Ford	England	35:07
4	Karel Lismont	Belgium	35:08
5	Detlef Uhlemann	West Germany	35:09
6	Enn Sellik	Soviet Union	35:17
7	Gary Tuttle	United States	35:19
8	Franco Fava	Italy	35:21
9	Jacques Boxberger	France	35:24
10	Tapio Kantanen	Finland	35:28
11	Mariano Haro	Spain	35:28
12	Vladimir Merkushin	Soviet Union	35:30
Full results

Teams
Rank	Team	Points
1st place, gold medalist(s)	England: Tony Simmons / 2; Bernie Ford / 3; David Slater / 15; Grenville Tuck / 16; David Black / 26; Mike Tagg / 28; (Steve Kenyon) / (47); (Andy Holden) / (112); (Dennis Coates) / (129)	90
2nd place, silver medalist(s)	Belgium: Karel Lismont / 4; Gaston Roelants / 13; Hendrik Schoofs / 17; Eddy Rombaux / 19; Willy Polleunis / 27; Robert Lismont / 38; (Eric De Beck) / (49); (Gilbert Maesschalk) / (65); (Eddy Van Mullem) / (97)	118
3rd place, bronze medalist(s)	France: Jacques Boxberger / 9; Lucien Rault / 18; Jean-Paul Gomez / 25; Jean-Luc Paugam / 32; Dominique Coux / 46; Alex Gonzalez / 57; (Radhouane Bouster) / (63); (Patrick Martin) / (71); (Pierre Levisse) / (90)	187
4	Soviet Union	219
5	Italy	224
6	United States	243
7	West Germany	292
8	Wales	304
Full results

- Note: Athletes in parentheses did not score for the team result

=== Junior men's race (7.8 km) ===
Individual race
Rank	Athlete	Country	Time
1st place, gold medalist(s)	Eric Hulst	United States	23:53.8
2nd place, silver medalist(s)	Thom Hunt	United States	24:06.8
3rd place, bronze medalist(s)	Nat Muir	Scotland	24:17
4	Thierry Watrice	France	24:23
5	Alberto Salazar	United States	24:36
6	Yahia Hadka	Morocco	24:38
7	Nick Lees	England	24:42
8	Don Moses	United States	24:43
9	Santiago Llorente	Spain	24:45
10	Harry Servranckx	Belgium	24:46
11	Marty Froelick	United States	24:47
12	José Luis González	Spain	24:49
Full results

Teams
Rank	Team	Points
1st place, gold medalist(s)	United States: Eric Hulst / 1; Thom Hunt / 2; Alberto Salazar / 5; Don Moses / 8; (Marty Froelick) / (11); (Ralph Serna) / (19)	16
2nd place, silver medalist(s)	Spain: Santiago Llorente / 9; José Luis González / 12; Rafael Nunez / 15; Antonio Prieto / 24; (José Calderón) / (40)	60
3rd place, bronze medalist(s)	England: Nick Lees / 7; Jeremy Lothian / 26; Nigel Field / 27; Nick Brawn / 31; (Paul Bettridge) / (46); (David Murphy) / (57)	91
4	Italy	97
5	Morocco	107
6	West Germany	115
7	Canada	120
8	Belgium	125
Full results

- Note: Athletes in parentheses did not score for the team result

=== Senior women's race (4.8 km) ===
Individual race
Rank	Athlete	Country	Time
1st place, gold medalist(s)	Carmen Valero	Spain	16:19.4
2nd place, silver medalist(s)	Tatyana Kazankina	Soviet Union	16:39
3rd place, bronze medalist(s)	Gabriella Dorio	Italy	16:56
4	Ann Yeoman	England	16:57
5	Renata Pentlinowska	Poland	17:00
6	Joëlle Debrouwer	France	17:01
7	Lynn Bjorklund	United States	17:02
8	Giana Romanova	Soviet Union	17:03
9	Mary Stewart	Scotland	17:04
10	Margherita Gargano	Italy	17:05
11	Tatyana Galstyan	Soviet Union	17:06
12	Raisa Katyukova	Soviet Union	17:07
Full results

Teams
Rank	Team	Points
1st place, gold medalist(s)	Soviet Union: Tatyana Kazankina / 2; Giana Romanova / 8; Tatyana Galstyan / 11; Raisa Katyukova / 12; (Olga Dvirna) / (29)	33
2nd place, silver medalist(s)	Italy: Gabriella Dorio / 3; Margherita Gargano / 10; Silvana Cruciata / 15; Cristina Tomasini / 31; (Sonia Basso) / (57)	59
3rd place, bronze medalist(s)	United States: Lynn Bjorklund / 7; Doris Heritage / 17; Debbie Quatier / 19; Judy Graham / 21; (Paula Neppel) / (24); (Cheryl Bridges) / (38)	64
4	England	78
5	Poland	87
6	France	107
7	Belgium	120
8	Ireland	122
Full results

- Note: Athletes in parentheses did not score for the team result

== Medal table (unofficial) ==
Rank	Nation	Gold	Silver	Bronze	Total
1	United States (USA)	2	1	1	4
2	England (ENG)	1	1	2	4
3	Soviet Union (URS)	1	1	0	2
3	Spain (ESP)	1	1	0	2
5	Portugal (POR)	1	0	0	1
6	Italy (ITA)	0	1	1	2
7	Belgium (BEL)	0	1	0	1
8	France (FRA)	0	0	1	1
8	Scotland (SCO)	0	0	1	1
Totals (9 entries)		6	6	6	18

- Note: Totals include both individual and team medals, with medals in the team competition counting as one medal.

== Participation ==
An unofficial count yields the participation of 306 athletes from 21 countries. This is in agreement with the official numbers as published.

- Algeria (14)
- Belgium (21)
- Brazil (5)
- Canada (6)
- England (21)
- Finland (18)
- France (21)
- Ireland (19)
- Italy (19)
- Morocco (15)
- Northern Ireland (10)
- Poland (6)
- Portugal (8)
- Scotland (20)
- Soviet Union (11)
- Spain (20)
- Sweden (7)
- Tunisia (9)
- United States (21)
- Wales (21)
- West Germany (14)

== See also ==
- 1976 IAAF World Cross Country Championships – Senior men's race
- 1976 IAAF World Cross Country Championships – Junior men's race
- 1976 IAAF World Cross Country Championships – Senior women's race
- 1976 in athletics (track and field)
