= Sonia Basso =

Italian cross-country skier (born 1954)

Personal information
- Nationality: Italian
- Born: 30 July 1954 (age 72)

Sport
- Country: Italy
- Sport: Athletics; Cross-country skiing
- Event: Long-distance running
Medal record
World Cross Country Championships
Silver medal – second place	1976 Chepstow	Team

Sonia Basso (born 30 July 1954) from Asiago is an Italian former cross-country skier and long-distance runner.

== Selected results ==
- 1977: 1st, Italian women's championships of cross-country skiing, 10 km
- 1979: 1st, Italian women's championships of cross-country skiing, 10 km
- 1980: 3rd, Italian women's championships of cross-country skiing, 10 km
- 1981: 2nd, Italian women's championships of cross-country skiing, 20 km

3rd, Italian women's championships of cross-country skiing, 10 km
