= Loredana Simonetti =

Italian middle-distance runner (1930–2026)

Personal information
- Nationality: Italian
- Born: 29 August 1930 Trieste, Italy
- Died: 26 February 2026 (aged 95)

Sport
- Country: Italy
- Sport: Athletics
- Event: Middle-distance running
- Club: Edera Trieste

Achievements and titles
- Personal best: 800 m: 2:16.5 (1954)

Loredana Simonetti (28 August 1930 – 26 February 2026) was an Italian middle-distance runner. She won nine national championships at individual senior level from 1949 to 1954 in two different specialities.

== Biography ==
Loredana Simonetti was several times national champion in the 800 m and in the cross-country running, participating in the European Championships in Bern in 1954.

Simonetti died on 26 February 2026, at the age of 95.

== National records ==
- 800 metres: 2:16.5, Bern, Switzerland, 25 August 1954. Record held until 6 June 1958 (broken by Gilda Jannaccone)

== National titles ==
- Italian Athletics Championships
  - 800 metres: 1949, 1950, 1951, 1952, 1953, 1954 (6)
- Italian Cross Country Championships
  - Cross-country running: 1950, 1951, 1954 (3)
