= 2004 European Cross Country Championships =

Coordinates: 53°57′46″N 14°08′42″E

- Organisers: EAA
- Edition: 11th
- Date: 12 December
- Host city: Heringsdorf, Germany
- Events: 4
- Distances: 9.64 km – Men; 5.64 km – Women; 5.64 km – Junior men 3.64 km – Junior women

The 11th European Cross Country Championships were held at Seebad Heringsdorf in Germany on 12 December 2004. Serhiy Lebid took his fifth title in the men's competition and Hayley Yelling won the women's race.

== Results ==
Complete results at the archive of The Sports.org.

=== Men individual 9.64 km ===
Pos.	Runners	Time
1st place, gold medalist(s)	(Ukraine) Serhiy Lebid	27:31
2nd place, silver medalist(s)	(Spain) Juan Carlos de la Ossa	27:54
3rd place, bronze medalist(s)	(France) Driss Maazouzi	28:05
4.	(Austria) Günther Weidlinger	28:08
5.	(France) Mounir el Housni	28:14
6.	(France) Mustapha Essaïd	28:23
7.	(United Kingdom) Karl Keska	28:23
8.	(Italy) Umberto Pusterla	28:24
9.	(Belgium) Tom van Hooste	28:25
10.	(Russia) Sergei Jemeljanov	28:25
11.	(Portugal) Fernando Silva	28:25
12.	(Italy) Maurizio Leone	28:25

Total 89 competitors

=== Men teams ===
Pos.	Team	Points
1st place, gold medalist(s)	France; Driss Maazouzi; Mounir el Housni; Mustapha Essaïd; Mokhtar Benhari	28
2nd place, silver medalist(s)	Italy; Umberto Pusterla (8th); Maurizio Leone (12th); Michele Gamba (13th); Gabriele De Nard (17th); Luciano Di Pardo (49th); Giuliano Battocletti (50th)	50
3rd place, bronze medalist(s)	United Kingdom	63
4.	Spain	71
5.	Portugal	104
6.	Russia	114
7.	Belgium	126
8.	Ukraine	128

Total 15 teams

=== Women individual 5.64 km ===
Pos.	Runners	Time
1st place, gold medalist(s)	(United Kingdom) Hayley Yelling	22:04
2nd place, silver medalist(s)	(Poland) Justyna Bąk	22:13
3rd place, bronze medalist(s)	(United Kingdom) Jo Pavey	22:26
4.	(Romania) Mihaela Botezan	22:36
5.	(Germany) Sabrina Mockenhaupt	22:44
6.	(Portugal) Mónica Rosa	22:45
7.	(Portugal) Inês Monteiro	22:47
8.	(Hungary) Anikó Kálovics	22:49
9.	(France) Maria Martins	22:50
10.	(Portugal) Anália Rosa	22:54
11.	(Russia) Lilia Shobukhova	22:59
12.	(Belgium) Veerle Dejaeghere	23:00

Total 74 competitors

=== Women teams ===
Pos.	Team	Points
1st place, gold medalist(s)	Portugal; Mónica Rosa; Inês Monteiro; Anália Rosa; Fernanda Ribeiro	38
2nd place, silver medalist(s)	United Kingdom	43
3rd place, bronze medalist(s)	France	97
4.	Germany	97
5.	Hungary	106
6.	Russia	111
7.	Belgium	117
8.	Spain	122

Total 13 teams

=== Junior men individual 5.64 km ===
Pos.	Runners	Time
1st place, gold medalist(s)	(Hungary) Barnabás Bene	20:52
2nd place, silver medalist(s)	(Russia) Yevgeniy Rybakov	20:52
3rd place, bronze medalist(s)	(Russia) Anatoliy Rybakov	20:53
4.	(Poland) Łukasz Parszczyński	20:58
5.	(Republic of Ireland) Mark Christie	21:04
6.	(Romania) Stefan Patru	21:07
7.	(United Kingdom) Luke Gunn	21:09
8.	(Republic of Ireland) Andrew Ledwith	21:12

Total 107 competitors

=== Junior men teams ===
Pos.	Team	Points
1st place, gold medalist(s)	Russia; Yevgeniy Rybakov; Anatoliy Rybakov; Stepan Kiselev; Aleksey Chistov	40
2nd place, silver medalist(s)	Ireland	54
3rd place, bronze medalist(s)	United Kingdom	59
4.	Italy	120
5.	Romania	128
6.	Poland	135
7.	Spain	136
8.	Belgium	153

Total 18 teams

=== Junior women individual 3.64 km ===
Pos.	Runners	Time
1st place, gold medalist(s)	(Turkey) Binnaz Uslu	15:32
2nd place, silver medalist(s)	(Romania) Ancuţa Bobocel	15:57
3rd place, bronze medalist(s)	(Spain) Marta Romo	16:04
4.	(Netherlands) Adrienne Herzog	16:06
5.	(Norway) Ingunn Opsal	16:07
6.	(Belarus) Volha Minina	16:10
7.	(Germany) Verena Dreier	16:20
8.	(France) Helene Guet	16:23

Total 89 competitors

=== Junior women teams ===
Pos.	Team	Points
1st place, gold medalist(s)	Romania; Ancuţa Bobocel; Larisa Arcip; Catalina Oprea; Paula Todoran	51
2nd place, silver medalist(s)	United Kingdom	65
3rd place, bronze medalist(s)	Russia	68
4.	Belarus	84
5.	Germany	96
6.	France	123
7.	Poland	127
8.	Italy	166

Total 15 teams
