= Alà dei Sardi =

Alà dei Sardi Alà (Sardinian)
- Comune
- Comune di Alà dei Sardi
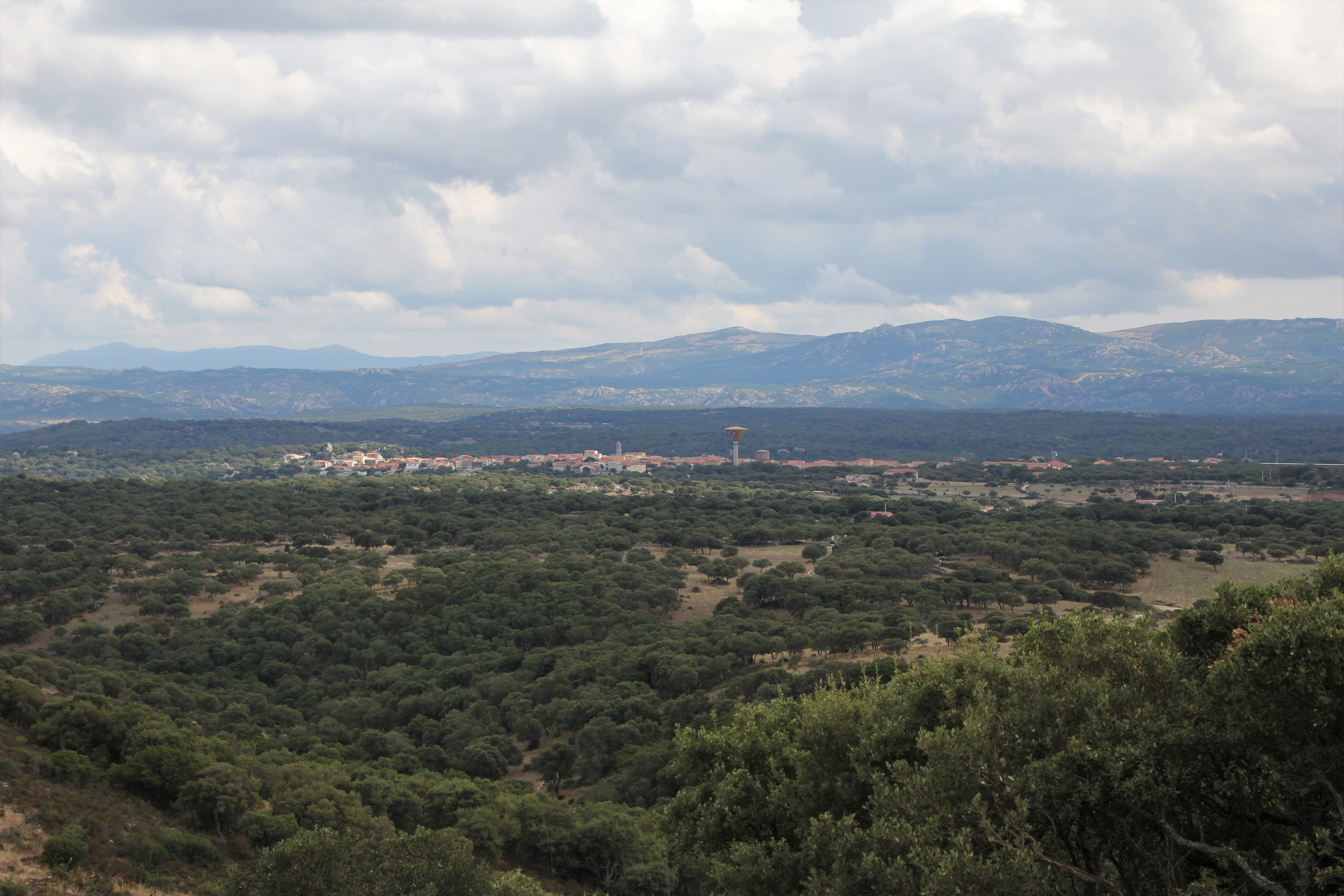
- View of Alà dei Sardi

- Coat of arms

- Location of Alà dei Sardi in Sardinia
- Coordinates: 40°39′N 9°20′E
- Country: Italy
- Region: Sardinia
- Province: Gallura North-East Sardinia
- Frazioni: BaBadde Suelzu, Mazzinaiu, S'iscala Pedrosa, Sos Sonorcolos

Government
  - Mayor: Francesco Ledda

Area
  - Total: 197.99 km^{2} (76.44 sq mi)
- Elevation: 700 m (2,300 ft)

Population (2026)
  - Total: 1,745
  - Density: 8.814/km^{2} (22.83/sq mi)
- Demonym: Alaesi
- Time zone: UTC+1 (CET)
  - Summer (DST): UTC+2 (CEST)
- Postal code: 07020
- Dialing code: 079
- Patron saint: St. Augustine
- Saint day: August 28
- Website: Official website

Alà dei Sardi (Sardinian: Alà) is a town and comune (municipality) in the Province of Gallura North-East Sardinia in the autonomous island region of Sardinia in Italy, located about 160 kilometres (99 miles) north of Cagliari and about 35 kilometres (22 miles) southwest of Olbia. It has 1,745 inhabitants.

Alà is characterized by a predominant use of Sardinian as everyday language. It is home to the Trofeo Alasport, an annual cross country running event.

Alà dei Sardi borders the municipalities of Berchidda, Bitti, Buddusò, Monti, Olbia, Oschiri, and Padru.

== History ==
The ancient origins of Alà dei Sardi are testified by the numerous archaeological findings in the area.

The origin of the name has been connected to both the Balares and the Ilienses, two Sardinian people who lived in the area and had never totally been subdued by the Romans.

The modern Alà appeared in the 16th century, and has since then been traditionally connected to the breeding and agricultural activities. The mining of coal begun in the 19th century.

== Demographics ==
As of 2026, the population is 1,745, of which 50.0% are male, and 50.0% are female. Minors make up 14.7% of the population, and seniors make up 26.8%.

Historical population

Year	Pop.	±%
1861	1,136	—
1871	1,295	+14.0%
1881	1,403	+8.3%
1901	1,680	+19.7%
1911	1,862	+10.8%
1921	2,011	+8.0%
1931	2,167	+7.8%
1936	2,088	−3.6%

Year	Pop.	±%
1951	2,443	+17.0%
1961	2,561	+4.8%
1971	2,232	−12.8%
1981	2,219	−0.6%
1991	2,052	−7.5%
2001	1,949	−5.0%
2011	1,947	−0.1%
2021	1,789	−8.1%

Source: ISTAT

=== Immigration ===
As of 2025, immigrants make up 5.2% of the total population. The 5 largest foreign countries of birth are Romania, the Netherlands, Germany, Switzerland, and Albania.
