= Michele Gamba =

Italian long-distance runner

Personal information
- Nationality: Italian
- Born: 2 October 1972 (age 53) San Donà di Piave

Sport
- Country: Italy
- Sport: Athletics
- Event: Long-distance running
- Club: G.S. Fiamme Gialle

Achievements and titles
- Personal bests: 5000 m: 13:23.85 (1999); Half marathon: 1:01:31 (2002)
Medal record
European Cross Country Championships
Silver medal – second place	2004 Heringsdorf	Team

Michele Gamba (born 2 October 1972) is a former Italian male long-distance runner who competed at two editions of the IAAF World Cross Country Championships at senior level (1998, 2001). and four of the IAAF World Half Marathon Championships (1996, 1997, 1998, 1999).

== Biography ==
He won three national championships at senior level (cross country running: 2001, half marathon: 2003,5000 m: 2004). He won 1999 Florence Marathon.
