= Giacomo Peppicelli =

Italian long-distance runner

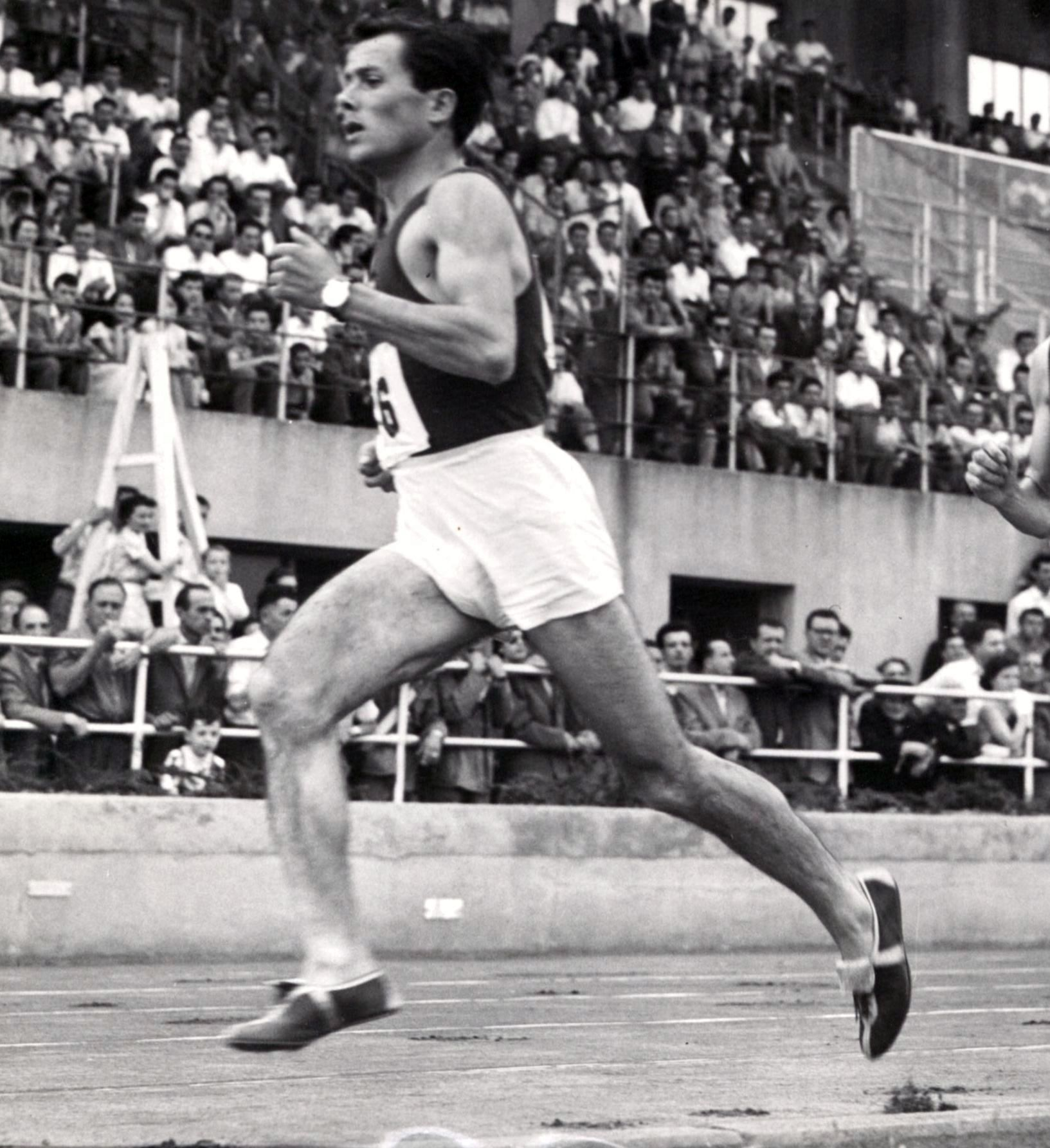

Personal information
- National team: Italy (12 caps from 1950 to 1956)
- Born: 27 March 1928 Città della Pieve, Italy
- Died: 7 July 2011 (aged 83) Paciano, Italy

Sport
- Country: Italy
- Sport: Athletics
- Event(s): Long-distance running Cross-country running
- Club: Polisportiva Testaccina; Gruppo Sportivo Fiat
- Coached by: Ubaldo Reposi

Achievements and titles
- Personal bests: 5000 m: 14:47.8 (1956); 10,000 m: 30:52 (?)

Giacomo Peppicelli (27 March 1928 - 7 July 2011) was an Italian male long-distance runner who won ten national titles at senior level.

== Biography ==
On the evening of June 27, 1956 in the athletics track of Turin, where, under the careful eye of his coach Reposi, he makes his own the Italian records of the hour, 20 km, 25 km and 30 km.

== National titles ==
He won 10 national championships at individual senior level.

- Italian Athletics Championships
  - 5000 metres: 1952, 1954
  - 10,000 metres: 1951, 1952, 1953
  - Half marathon: 1953, 1957
- Italian Cross Country Championships
  - Long race: 1951, 1953. 1955
