= Lynn Bjorklund =

American long-distance runner

Personal information
- National team: USA
- Citizenship: American
- Born: June 24, 1957 (age 69) Los Alamos, New Mexico
- Occupation: Park Ranger
- Years active: 1975-1982

Sport
- Country: USA
- Sport: long-distance runner

Achievements and titles
- Personal best(s): 1975: U.S. high school record in the 3000 meter run, a record which stood until 2013. 1981: the female course record for the Pikes Peak Marathon.

Lynn Bjorklund (born June 24, 1957) is an American retired long-distance runner originally from Los Alamos, New Mexico. In 1975, she set the U.S. high school record in the 3000 meter run, a record which stood until 2013. In 1981, she also set the female course record for the Pikes Peak Marathon. As of 2010 she was employed as a park ranger.

Bjorklund rapidly gained national prominence after she won the girls' division of the National Amateur Athletic Union (AAU) Cross Country Championships in Albuquerque, New Mexico. She won consecutive titles at the USA Cross Country Championships in 1974 and 1975. She came in seventh place at the World Cross Country Championships in 1976.

On October 8, 1997, Bjorklund was camping with her brother in the Pecos Wilderness near Santa Fe, New Mexico when the two witnessed a plane crash. The pilot and his passenger were burned and injured. In a rescue attempt, Bjorklund covered 18 miles (29 km) of rugged terrain on foot in less than three hours. She guided two helicopters to the crash site, and the two men were airlifted to safety.
