= Vittorio Maggioni =

Italian middle-distance runner

Personal information
- National team: Italy (9 caps from 1951 to 1954)
- Born: 11 December 1930 Desio, Italy
- Died: 14 September 2017 (aged 86) Cesano Maderno, Italy

Sport
- Country: Italy
- Sport: Athletics
- Event: Middle-distance running
- Club: Pro Patria Milano

Achievements and titles
- Personal bests: 800 m: 1:56.4 (1953); 1500 m: 3:58.8 (1953)

Vittorio Maggioni (20 December 1930 - 14 September 2017) was an Italian male middle distance runner who won eight national titles at senior level.

== National titles ==
He won 8 national championships at individual senior level.

- Italian Athletics Championships
  - 800 metres: 1953
  - 1500 metres: 1951, 1952, 1953, 1954
  - 3000 m steeplechase: 1951, 1952, 1954
