= Ester Palmesino =

Italian high jumper (1927–2016)

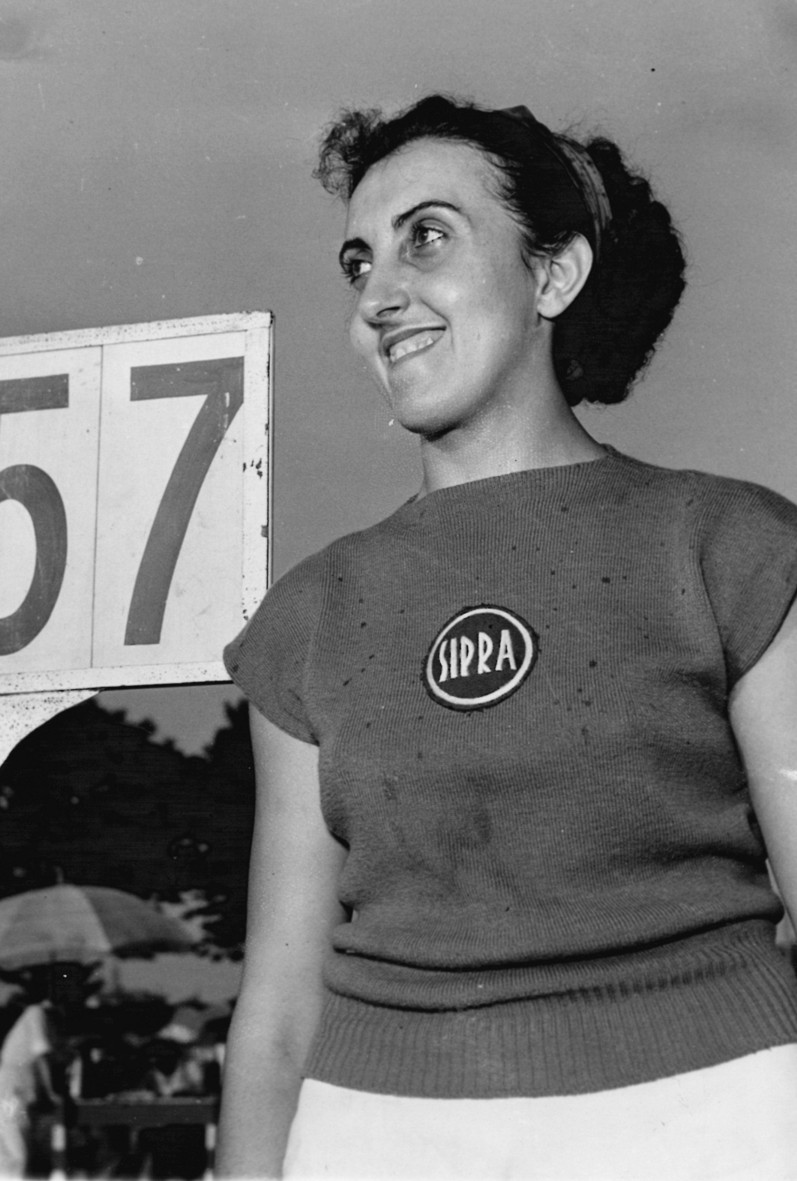
- Ester Palmesino, Padua 17 June 1951, Team Championships

Personal information
- Nationality: Italy
- Born: 7 May 1927 Asti, Italy
- Died: 20 March 2016 (aged 88) Turin, Italy
- Height: 175 cm (5 ft 9 in)

Sport
- Club: Sipra/Sip

Ester Palmesino (7 May 1927 – 20 March 2016) was an Italian high jumper.

== Career ==
Palmesino was four-times Italian champion in high jump, winner and finalist of international competitions.

== Achievements ==
Year	Competition	Venue	Position	Notes
Representing Italy
1946	Italian Athletics Championships	Parma, Italy	1st	1.45 m
1946	International Meetings - Italy-Austria	Turin, Italy	1st	1.50 m
1947	International Meetings - Austria-Italy	Vienna, Austria	2nd	1.53 m
1947	International Meetings - Italy-Czechoslovakia	Turin, Italy	1st	1.53 m
1948	Italian Athletics Championships	Milan, Italy	1st	1.53 m
1948	International Meetings - Italy-Netherlands	Rome, Italy	3rd	1.50 m
1948	International Meetings - Italy-Hungary	Turin, Italy	1st	1.45 m
1949	International Meetings - Netherlands-Italy	Rotterdam, Netherlands	2nd	1.55 m
1949	International Meetings - Czechoslovakia-Italy	Zlín, Czech Republic	3rd	1.50 m
1949	International Meetings - Italy-Yugoslavia	Bologna, Italy	3rd	1.45 m
1950	International Meetings - Italy-Austria	Udine, Italy	4th	1.50 m
1951	International Meetings - Yugoslavia-Italy	Zagreb, Croatia Yugoslavia	2nd	1.50 m
1951	International Meetings - Switzerland-Italy	Winterthur, Switzerland	2nd	1.53 m
1951	International Meetings - Italy-France	Genoa, Italy	2nd	1.48 m
1952	Italian Athletics Championships	Bologna, Italy	1st	1.50 m
1952	International Meetings - Italy-Germany	Milan, Italy	4th	1.45 m
1952	International Meetings - Italy-United Kingdom	Naples, Italy	3rd	1.48 m
1953	Italian Athletics Championships	Rome, Italy	1st	1.50 m
1953	International Meetings - France-Italy	Chambery, France	3rd	1.54 m
1953	International Meetings - Austria-Italy-Switzerland	Trieste, Italy	4th	1.45 m
1954	International Meetings - Germany-Italy	Munich, Germany	4th	1.45 m
1954	International Meetings - Austria-Italy	Linz, Austria	3rd	1.45 m
