= Leandrina Bulzacchi =

Italian middle-distance runner

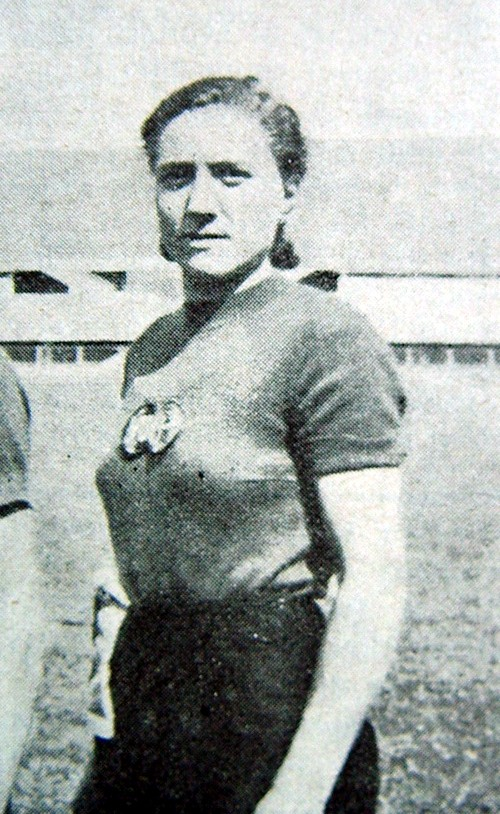

Personal information
- Nationality: Italian
- Born: 28 March 1912 Soresina, Italy
- Died: unknown

Sport
- Country: Italy
- Sport: Athletics
- Event: Middle-distance running

Achievements and titles
- Personal best: 800 m: 2:25.2 (1936)

Leandrina Bulzacchi (28 March 1912 - date of death unknown) was an Italian female middle-distance runner, who won twelve national championships at individual senior level from 1928 to 1938 in two different specialities.

== National titles ==
- Italian Athletics Championships
  - 800 metres: 1930, 1931, 1934, 1935, 1936, 1937, 1938 (7)
- Italian Cross Country Championships
  - Cross-country running: 1928, 1935, 1936, 1937, 1938 (5)
