= Angelo Davoli =

Italian middle-distance runner

Personal information
- Nationality: Italian
- Born: 12 November 1896 Genoa
- Died: 13 February 1978 (aged 81)

Sport
- Country: Italy
- Sport: Athletics
- Event: Middle-distance running

Angelo Davoli (12 November 1896 - 13 February 1978) was an Italian middle-distance runner who competed at the 1924 Summer Olympics.

== National titles ==
He won eight times the national championships at senior level.

- Italian Athletics Championships
  - 1500 metres: 1927
  - 5000 metres: 1924, 1926
  - 3000 metres steeplechase: 1928, 1930
  - Cross country: 1923, 1924, 1926
