= Umberto Pusterla =

Italian long-distance runner

Personal information
- Nationality: Italian
- Born: 21 October 1967 (age 58)

Sport
- Country: Italy
- Sport: Athletics
- Event: Long-distance running

Achievements and titles
- Personal best: Half marathon: 1:03.29 (2002)
Medal record
European Cross Country Championships
Gold medal – first place	1998 Ferrara	Team
Silver medal – second place	2004 Heringsdorf	Team

Umberto Pusterla (born 21 October 1967) is a former Italian male long-distance runner who competed at 11 editions of the IAAF World Cross Country Championships (from 1986 to 2005).

== Biography ==
He won two medals at the European Cross Country Championships with the national team, and won four national championships at senior level.
