= Gilda Jannaccone =

Italian middle-distance runner

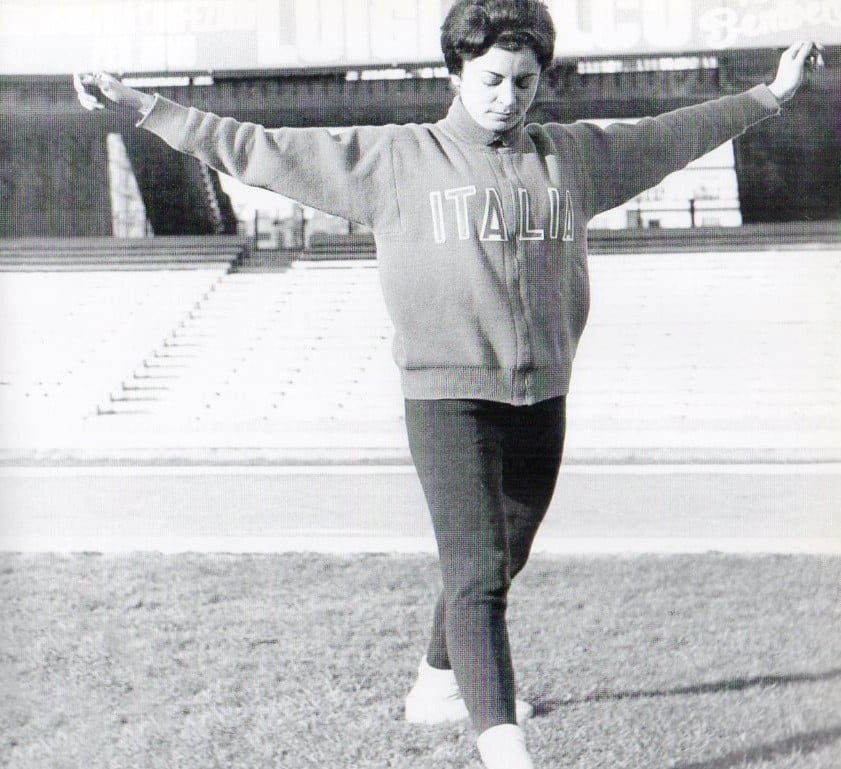
- Jannaccone in 1960s

Personal information
- National team: Italy: 19 (1957–1965)
- Born: 11 March 1940 (age 86) Naples, Italy
- Height: 1.64 m (5 ft 5 in)
- Weight: 54 kg (119 lb)

Sport
- Sport: Athletics
- Event: Middle distance running
- Club: Libertas Ridolfi

Achievements and titles
- Personal best: 800 m: 2:08.9 (1964)

Gilda Jannaccone (born 12 March 1940 in Naples) is an Italian former middle distance runner.

== Career ==
Jannaccone participated at the 1960 Summer Olympics. She has 19 caps from the national team from 1957 to 1965.

== National records ==
- 400 m: 60.9 ( (Italy) Naples, 18 May 1957) – holder until 23 June 1957
- 800 m: 2:08.9 ( (Socialist Federal Republic of Yugoslavia) Zagreb, 30 September 1964) – holder until 16 June 1966

== Achievements ==
Year	Competition	Venue	Rank	Event	Time	Note
1960	Olympic Games	(Italy) Rome	Heat	800 m	2:13.72	
1962	European Championships	(Socialist Federal Republic of Yugoslavia) Belgrade	Heat	800 m	2:13.6	

== National titles ==
Gilda Jannaccone won the individual national championship 12 times.

- 6 wins on 800 metres (1958, 1959, 1960, 1961, 1962, 1963)
- 6 wins on cross country running (1958, 1959, 1960, 1961, 1962, 1963)

== See also ==
- Italian Athletics Champions in women's 800 m
