= Maurizio Leone =

Italian long-distance runner

Personal information
- Nationality: Italian
- Born: 17 August 1973 (age 53) Cosenza, Italy

Sport
- Country: Italy
- Sport: Athletics
- Event: Long-distance running

Achievements and titles
- Personal best: Half marathom: 1:03:12 (2000)
Medal record
European Cross Country Championships
Silver medal – second place	2004 Heringsdorf	Team
Summer Universiade
Bronze medal – third place	1995 Fukuoka	5000 m

Maurizio Leone (born 17 August 1973) is a former Italian male long-distance runner who competed at four editions of the IAAF World Cross Country Championships at senior level (1995, 2001, 2003, 2005). He won two national championships at senior level (cross country running: 2005).
