= Luigi Conti (athlete) =

Italian long-distance runner (1937–2025)

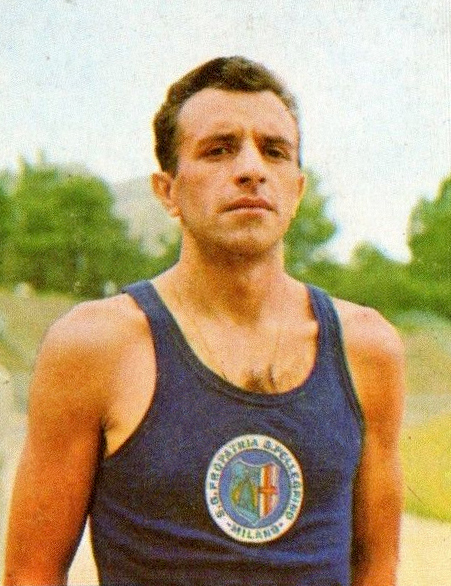

Personal information
- Born: 11 September 1937 Rancio, Como, Italy
- Died: 5 March 2025 (aged 87) Schio
- Height: 170 cm (5 ft 7 in)
- Weight: 60 kg (132 lb)

Sport
- Sport: Men's athletics
- Event: 5000 m
- Club: CS Esercito

Achievements and titles
- Personal best: 5000 m – 14:01.55 (1960)

Luigi Conti (11 September 1937 – 5 March 2025) was an Italian long-distance runner.

== Biography ==
He finished 12th in the 5000 metres event of the 1960 Summer Olympics. He was born in Rancio in the Province of Como and ran for the Centro Sportivo Esercito military sports club. He also represented his nation at the 1966 European Athletics Championships, where he ran in the marathon, but failed to finish.

He was a five-time national champion at the Italian Athletics Championships, winning the 5000 m in 1959, 1960 and 1963, as well as the 10,000 metres in 1960 and 1963. He also won the Italian cross country running title in 1962 and 1965. He held a personal best of 14:01.55 minutes for the 5000 m.
