= Olga Dvirna =

Soviet middle-distance runner

Personal information
- Born: 11 February 1953 (age 73) Cherkasy Oblast, Ukrainian SSR, Soviet Union
Medal record
Women's athletics
Representing the Soviet Union
European Championships
Gold medal – first place	1982 Athens	1500 m
Summer Universiade
Silver medal – second place	1979 Mexico City	800 m
Silver medal – second place	1979 Mexico City	1500 m
Bronze medal – third place	1981 Bucharest	1500 m

Olga Dvirna (Ukrainian: Ольга Двірна; born 11 February 1953) is a retired female middle-distance runner who represented the Soviet Union in the late 1970s and early 1980s. She set her personal best in the women's 1,500 metres (3:54.23) on July 27, 1982, at a meet in Kiev.
