= Cristina Tomasini =

Italian long-distance runner

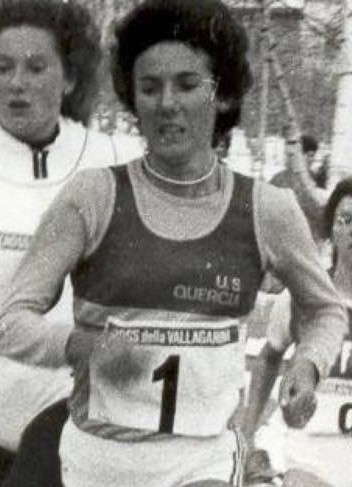
- Cristina Tomasini during an edition of the Cross della Vallagarina

Personal information
- Nationality: Italian
- Born: 26 July 1958 (age 67) Rovereto

Sport
- Country: Italy
- Sport: Athletics
- Event: Long-distance running
- Club: Quercia Rovereto

Achievements and titles
- Personal bests: 5000 m: 16:03.9 (1980); 10,000 m: 32:40.22 (1986)
Medal record
World Cross Country Championships
Silver medal – second place	1976 Chepstow	Team
Silver medal – second place	1982 Rome	Team
Bronze medal – third place	1981 Madrid	Team
European Clubs Cross Country Cup
Gold medal – first place	1982 Formia	Individual

Cristina Tomasini (born 26 July 1958) is a retired Italian long-distance runner, who participated at the 1987 World Championships in Athletics.

== Biography ==
Her best result at International level was the 5th place at the 1977 IAAF World Cross Country Championships, competition when she won also three important medals with the team, while at European level her best result was the victory at IAAF World Cross Country Championships held in Formia in 1982. She won four times the national championships at senior level.

Her performance on the 5000 metres in 1980, when she was under 23, was the third time in Europe. Cristina Tomasini also won BOclassic (an international road running race that take place every 31 December in Bolzano) edition of 1985.

== Achievements ==
Year	Competition	Venue	Position	Event	Time	Notes
1977	World Cross Country Championships	(West Germany) Düsseldorf	5th	5.1 km	17:44	
1979	World Cross Country Championships	(Republic of Ireland) Limerick	10th	5.04 km	17:46	
1980	World Cross Country Championships	(France) Paris	12th	4.82 km	16:10	
1987	World Championships	(Italy) Rome	Semi	10,000 m	NM	

== National titles ==
- Italian Athletics Championships
  - 3000 metres: 1977
  - 10,000 metres: 1986
  - Half marathon: 1987
  - Cross country: 1977

== Circuit wins ==
- European Athletics permit meeting
  - Cross della Vallagarina: 1978, 1980, 1982
