= Gabriella Dorio =

Italian athlete (born 1957)

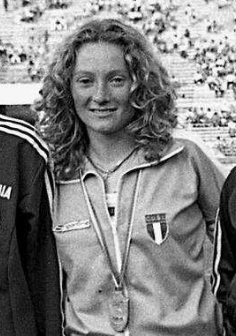
- Dorio in 1981

Personal information
- Nationality: Italian
- Born: 27 June 1957 (age 69) Veggiano, Veneto, Italy
- Height: 1.67 m (5 ft 5 1/2 in)
- Weight: 55 kg (121 lb)
- Relative: Francesca Michielin (daughter-in-law)

Sport
- Country: Italy
- Sport: Athletics
- Event: Middle distance running
- Club: Iveco Torino

Achievements and titles
- Personal bests: 800 m: 1:57.66 (1980); 1500 m: 3:58.65 (1982)
Medal record
Women's athletics
Representing Italy
Olympic Games
Gold medal – first place	1984 Los Angeles	1500 m
European Championships
Bronze medal – third place	1982 Athens	1500 m
European Indoor Championships
Gold medal – first place	1982 Milan	1500 m
World Cross Country Championships
Silver medal – second place	1976 Chepstow	Team
Silver medal – second place	1982 Rome	Team
Summer Universiade
Gold medal – first place	1981 Bucharest	1500 m
Gold medal – first place	1983 Edmonton	1500 m
Silver medal – second place	1981 Bucharest	800 m

Gabriella Dorio (born 27 June 1957) is an Italian former athlete and Olympic gold winner. She won three medals at senior level at International athletics competitions.

== Biography ==
She first participated in the 1976 Summer Olympics, placing sixth in the 1500 metres race then ran the same event and placed fifth in Summer Olympics four years later. She won the gold medal at the 1982 European Indoor Championships, the bronze medal at the 1982 European Championships, and finally the gold medal at the 1984 Summer Olympics in Los Angeles, beating the Romanians Doina Melinte (silver) and Maricica Puică (bronze).

She represented her national team 65 times between 1973 and 1991.

== Achievements ==
Year	Competition	Venue	Position	Event	Notes
1973	European Junior Championships	Duisburg, West Germany	8th	800 m	
1974	European Championships	Rome, Italy	9th	1,500 m	
1975	European Junior Championships	Athens, Greece	3rd	1,500 m	
1976	Olympic Games	Montreal, Canada	6th	1,500 m	
1978	European Championships	Prague, Czechoslovakia	6th	1,500 m	
1979	Mediterranean Games	Split, Yugoslavia	1st	800 m	
1980	Olympic Games	Moscow, Soviet Union	8th	800 m	
1980	Olympic Games	Moscow, Soviet Union	4th	1,500 m	
1982	European Indoor Championships	Milan, Italy	1st	1,500 m	
1982	European Championships	Athens, Greece	3rd	1,500 m	
1983	European Indoor Championships	Budapest, Hungary	4th	1,500 m	
1983	World Championships	Helsinki, Finland	7th	1,500 m	
1984	European Indoor Championships	Gothenburg, Sweden	8th	1,500 m	
1984	Olympic Games	Los Angeles California, United States	4th	800 m	
1984	Olympic Games	Los Angeles California, United States	1st	1,500 m	

== National titles ==
Gabriella Dorio has 23 individual wins in the national championships.

- 7 wins in the 800 metres (1974, 1975, 1976, 1980, 1981, 1982, 1983)
- 10 wins in the 1500 metres (1973, 1976, 1977, 1978, 1979, 1980, 1981, 1982, 1983, 1984)
- 2 wins in the 800 metres indoor (1978, 1979)
- 2 wins in the 1500 metres indoor (1981, 1983)
- 2 wins in the cross country running (1976, 1983)

== See also ==
- Italian Athletics Championships - Women multi winners
- Italy national athletics team - Women's more caps
- Italian all-time top lists - 800 m
- Italian all-time top lists - 1500 m
- FIDAL Hall of Fame
