= Margherita Gargano =

Italian middle-distance runner

Personal information
- Nationality: Italian
- Born: 18 November 1952 (age 73) Bagheria

Sport
- Country: Italy
- Sport: Athletics
- Event: Long-distance running
Medal record
World Cross Country Championships
Silver medal – second place	1974 Monza	Team
Silver medal – second place	1976 Chepstow	Team
Silver medal – second place	1982 Rome	Team

Margherita Gargano (born 18 November 1952 in Bagheria, Province of Palermo) is a former female middle distance runner from Italy.

== Biography ==
She is best known for winning the gold medal at the 1979 Mediterranean Games in the women's 1,500 metres. Gargano set her personal best (4:06.71) in the 1,500 metres in 1979.

== Personal bests ==
- 800m 2'03"1 (1979)- 2'06"3 indoor (1980)
- 1500m 4'06"71(1979)- 4'19"81 indoor (1983)
- 3000m 8'46"31 (1982)- 9'03"62 indoor (1982)
- 5000m 15'20"94 (1982)
- 10000m 35'01"4 (1976)

== Achievements ==
Year	Tournament	Venue	Result	Event
1976	Summer Olympics	Montreal, Canada	DNQ	1,500 metres
1979	Mediterranean Games	Tunis, Tunisia	1st	1,500 metres
1982	European Championships	Athens, Greece	6th	3,000 metres

== See also ==
- Italian all-time top lists - 5000 m
