= Athletics at the 1983 Mediterranean Games =

1983 Athletics at the Mediterranean Games

- Dates: 12–16 September
- Host city: (Morocco) Casablanca
- Venue: Stade Mohammed V
- Events: 23 + 16
- Participation: 16 nations

Athletics at the 1983 Mediterranean Games were held in Casablanca, Morocco from 12 to 16 September.

== Medal table ==
Host nation

* Host nation (Morocco)

Rank	Nation	Gold	Silver	Bronze	Total
1	France	13	12	5	30
2	Italy	10	11	13	34
3	Greece	5	2	1	8
4	Morocco*	4	2	2	8
5	Yugoslavia	3	5	5	13
6	Spain	2	5	10	17
7	Algeria	1	1	1	3
8	Turkey	1	1	0	2
9	Egypt	0	1	1	2
10	Tunisia	0	0	1	1
Totals (10 entries)		39	40	39	118

== Results ==
=== Men's events ===
Event	Gold		Silver		Bronze	
100 metres (wind: +0.1 m/s)	Pierfrancesco Pavoni (ITA)	10.24	Antoine Richard (FRA)	10.26	Stefano Tilli (ITA)	10.29
200 metres (wind: +3.2 m/s)	Pietro Mennea (ITA)	20.30 w	Jean-Jacques Boussemart (FRA)	20.41 w	Carlo Simionato (ITA)	20.63 w
400 metres	Aldo Canti (FRA)	45.29 GR	Hector Llatser (FRA)	45.79	Željko Knapić (YUG)	45.95
800 metres	Saïd Aouita (MAR)	1:51.45	Faouzi Lahbi (MAR)	1:51.63	Colomán Trabado (ESP)	1:52.19
1500 metres	Saïd Aouita (MAR)	3:39.19 GR	José Luis González (ESP)	3:39.59	José Manuel Abascal (ESP)	3:39.64
5000 metres	Alberto Cova (ITA)	13:57.77	Filippos Filippou (GRE)	13:59.37	Antonio Prieto (ESP)	13:59.91
10,000 metres	Thierry Watrice (FRA)	29:05.95	Venanzio Ortis (ITA)	29:12.89	Luis Adsuara (ESP)	29:19.25
Marathon	Mehmet Terzi (TUR)	2:22:33	Ahmet Altun (TUR)	2:22:52	Honorato Hernández (ESP)	2:23:15
110 metres hurdlers (wind: +5.2 m/s)	Javier Moracho (ESP)	13.54 w	Carlos Sala (ESP)	13.55 w	Daniele Fontecchio (ITA)	13.64 w
400 metres hurdlers	José Alonso (ESP)	50.96	Carlos Azulay (ESP)	51.90	Ahmed Abdel Halim Ghanem (EGY)	51.99
3000 m steeplechase	Joseph Mahmoud (FRA)	8:19:29 GR	Domingo Ramón (ESP)	8:19.60	Francisco Sánchez (ESP)	8:20.67
4×100 metres relay	Italy; Pierfrancesco Pavoni; Carlo Simionato; Stefano Tilli; Pietro Mennea	38.76 GR	France; Thierry François; Marc Gasparoni; Antoine Richard; Jean-Jacques Boussemart	39.54	Greece; Aggelos Angelidis; Theodoros Gatzios; Nikolaos Hatzinikolau; Kosmas Stratos	40.31
4×400 metres relay	France; Jean-Jacques Février; Hector Llatser; Jean-Jacques Boussemart; Aldo Canti	3:04.38	Italy; Roberto Ribaud; Donato Sabia; Mauro Zuliani; Daniele D'Amico	3:04.54	Spain; Antonio Sánchez; Benjamín González; José Alonso; Ángel Heras	3:06.54
20 km walk	Maurizio Damilano (ITA)	1:23:19 GR	Gérard Lelièvre (FRA)	1:24:32	Sergio Spagnulo (ITA)	1:27:54
High jump	Othmane Belfaa (ALG)	2.26 m =GR	Bernard Bachorz (FRA)	2.26 m	Franck Verzy (FRA)	2.22 m
Pole vault	Patrick Abada (FRA)	5.55 m GR	Serge Leveur (FRA)	5.30 m	Mauro Barella & Viktor Drechsel (ITA)	5.10 m
Long jump	Dimitrios Delifotis (GRE)	7.77 m	Antonio Corgos (ESP)	7.75 m	Marco Piochi (ITA)	7.74 m w
Triple jump	Dimitrios Mikhas (GRE)	16.70 m	Dario Badinelli (ITA)	16.50 m	Christian Valétudié (FRA)	16.33 m w
Shot put	Jovan Lazarević (YUG)	20.05 m	Alessandro Andrei (ITA)	19.61 m	Vladimir Milić (YUG)	19.40 m
Discus throw	Kostas Georgakopoulos (GRE)	62.58 m GR	Mohamed Naguib Hamed (EGY)	61.24 m	Marco Martino (ITA)	58.72 m
Hammer throw	Giampaolo Urlando (ITA)	69.94 m GR	Orlando Bianchini (ITA)	68.58 m	Raul Jimeno (ESP)	67.16 m
Javelin throw	Agostino Ghesini (ITA)	79.28 m	Michel Bertimon (FRA)	78.12 m	Tarek Chaabani (TUN)	73.28 m
Decathlon	Joško Vlašić (YUG)	7440 pts	Hubert Indra (ITA)	7314 pts	Mohamed Bensaad (ALG)	7197 pts

=== Women's events ===
Event	Gold		Silver		Bronze	
100 metres (wind: +0.7 m/s)	Rose-Aimée Bacoul (FRA)	11.19 GR	Marisa Masullo (ITA)	11.47	Marie-France Loval (FRA)	11.62
200 metres (wind: +2.8 m/s)	Rose-Aimée Bacoul (FRA)	22.67 w	Liliane Gaschet (FRA)	22.97 w	Marisa Masullo (ITA)	23.12 w
400 metres	Raymonde Naigre (FRA)	52.78	Erica Rossi (ITA)	53.83	Cosetta Campana (ITA)	54.52
800 metres	Nathalie Thoumas (FRA)	2:07.06	Slobodanka Čolović (YUG)	2:07.34	Mirela Šket (YUG)	2:07.70
1500 metres	Agnese Possamai (ITA)	4:13.58	Marica Mršić (YUG)	4:15.04	Gloria Pallé (ESP)	4:18.69
3000 metres	Agnese Possamai (ITA)	9:15.64	Marica Mršić (YUG)	9:17.13	Pilar Fernández (ESP)	9:24.96
100 metres hurdles (wind: +0.5 m/s)	Michèle Chardonnet (FRA)	13.21 GR	Elissavet Pantazi (GRE)	13.42	Marie-Noëlle Savigny (FRA)	13.44
400 metres hurdlers	Nawal El Moutawakel (MAR)	56.59 GR	Giuseppina Cirulli (ITA)	58.48	Mojca Šavle (YUG)	59.41
4×100 metres relay	France; Rose-Aimée Bacoul; Marie-France Loval; Marie-Christine Cazier; Liliane Gaschet	43.36 GR	Italy; Mary Busato; Daniela Ferrian; Marisa Masullo; Gisella Trombin	44.79	Morocco; Nawal El Moutawakel; Fatima Salahi; Fatima Braiz; Naima Benboubker	46.69
4×400 metres relay	Italy; Cosetta Campana; Giuseppina Cirulli; Letizia Magenti; Erica Rossi	3:33.63 GR	France; Liliane Gaschet; Viviane Couédriau; Raymonde Naigre; Natalie Thoumas	3:35.41	Yugoslavia; Katica Mataković; Slobodanka Čolović; Mirela Šket; Elizabeta Božinovska	3:37.87
High jump	Maryse Éwanjé-Épée (FRA)	1.89 m	Biljana Bojović (YUG); Lidija Lapajne (YUG)	1.86 m		
Long jump	Snežana Dančetović (YUG)	6.30 m	Naïma Benboubker (MAR)	5.95 m	Antonella Capriotti (ITA)	5.94 m
Shot put	Soultana Saroudi (GRE)	18.01 m GR	Simone Créantor (FRA)	16.36 m	Souad Malloussi (MAR)	15.30 m
Discus throw	Isabelle Accambray (FRA)	53.70 m GR	Catherine Beauvais (FRA)	53.62 m	Renata Scaglia (ITA)	53.34 m
Javelin throw	Anna Verouli (GRE)	61.62 m GR	Fausta Quintavalla (ITA)	59.08 m	Nadine Schoellkopf (FRA)	52.54 m
Heptathlon	Chérifa Meskaoui (MAR)	5498 pts w	Dalila Tayebi (ALG)	5456 pts GR	Esmeralda Pecchio (ITA)	5379 pts

== Men's results ==
=== 100 meters ===
Heats – 12 September
Wind:
Heat 1: +3.6 m/s, Heat 2: +0.5 m/s

Rank	Heat	Name	Nationality	Time	Notes
1	1	Pierfrancesco Pavoni	Italy	10.43	Q
1	2	Stefano Tilli	Italy	10.46	Q

Final – 12 September
Wind: +0.1 m/s

Rank	Name	Nationality	Time	Notes
1st place, gold medalist(s)	Pierfrancesco Pavoni	Italy	10.24	
2nd place, silver medalist(s)	Antoine Richard	France	10.26	
3rd place, bronze medalist(s)	Stefano Tilli	Italy	10.29	
4	Stratos Kosmas	Greece	10.41	
5	Marc Gasparoni	France	10.42	
6	Nikos Hadjinicolaou	Greece	10.52	
7	Omar Ghizlat	Morocco	10.56	
8	Ali Bakhta	Algeria	10.63	

=== 200 meters ===
Heats – 13 September
Wind: Heat 1: +1.0 m/s, Heat 2: +0.6 m/s

Rank	Heat	Name	Nationality	Time	Notes
1	1	Pietro Mennea	Italy	20.28	Q
2	2	Carlo Simionato	Italy	20.89	Q
?	?	Marc Gasparoni	France	21.04	
5	2	Antonio Sánchez	Spain	21.35	q
6	1	Isidoro Hornillos	Spain	21.73	

Final – 15 September
Wind: +3.2 m/s

Rank	Lane	Name	Nationality	Time	Notes
1st place, gold medalist(s)	3	Pietro Mennea	Italy	20.30w	
2nd place, silver medalist(s)	6	Jean-Jacques Boussemart	France	20.41w	
3rd place, bronze medalist(s)	8	Carlo Simionato	Italy	20.63w	
4	4	Ali Bakhta	Algeria	20.95w	
5	5	Omar Ghizlat	Morocco	20.96w	
6	7	Mladen Nikolić	Yugoslavia	21.09w	
7	2	Antonio Sánchez	Spain	21.20w	
8	1	Marc Gasparoni	France	21.21w	

=== 400 meters ===
Heats – 12 September

Rank	Heat	Name	Nationality	Time	Notes
1	2	Ángel Heras	Spain	46.16	Q
2	1	Roberto Ribaud	Italy	46.69	Q
3	2	Mauro Zuliani	Italy	46.77	Q
6	1	Benjamín González	Spain	48.66	

Final – 13 September

Rank	Name	Nationality	Time	Notes
1st place, gold medalist(s)	Aldo Canti	France	45.28	=GR
2nd place, silver medalist(s)	Hector Llatser	France	45.79	
3rd place, bronze medalist(s)	Željko Knapić	Yugoslavia	45.95	
4	Roberto Ribaud	Italy	46.03	
5	Nafi Mersaal	Egypt	46.08	
6	Ismail Mačev	Yugoslavia	46.27	
7	Ángel Heras	Spain	46.57	
8	Mauro Zuliani	Italy	47.08	

=== 800 meters ===
Heats – 15 September

Rank	Heat	Name	Nationality	Time	Notes
1	2	Colomán Trabado	Spain	1:47.01	Q
5	2	Ricardo Materazzi	Italy	1:48.35	q
3	1	Andrés Vera	Spain	1:49.75	

Final – 16 September

Rank	Name	Nationality	Time	Notes
1st place, gold medalist(s)	Saïd Aouita	Morocco	1:51.45	
2nd place, silver medalist(s)	Faouzi Lahbi	Morocco	1:51.63	
3rd place, bronze medalist(s)	Colomán Trabado	Spain	1:52.19	
4	Mohamed Alouini	Algeria	1:52.36	
5	Spyros Spyrou	Greece	1:52.60	
6	Sotirios Moutsanas	Greece	1:52.78	
7	Saïd Oukali	Algeria	1:52.97	
	Ricardo Materazzi	Italy	DNS	

=== 1500 meters ===
12 September

Rank	Name	Nationality	Time	Notes
1st place, gold medalist(s)	Saïd Aouita	Morocco	3:39.19	
2nd place, silver medalist(s)	José Luis González	Spain	3:39.59	
3rd place, bronze medalist(s)	José Manuel Abascal	Spain	3:39.64	
4	Abderrahmane Morceli	Algeria	3:40.89	
5	Mohamed Zahafi	Morocco	3:40.92	
6	Amar Brahmia	Algeria	3:41.07	
7	Dominique Bouchard	France	3:41.07	
8	Pascal Thiébaut	France	3:42.64	
9	Claudio Patrignani	Italy	3:43.15	

=== 5000 meters ===
16 September

Rank	Name	Nationality	Time	Notes
1st place, gold medalist(s)	Alberto Cova	Italy	13:57.77	
2nd place, silver medalist(s)	Filippos Filippou	Greece	13:59.37	
3rd place, bronze medalist(s)	Antonio Prieto	Spain	13:59.91	
4	Franco Boffi	Italy	14:00.34	
5	Féthi Baccouche	Tunisia	14:01.08	
6	Jorge García	Spain	14:01.32	
7	Abderrazak Bounour	Algeria	14:17.04	
8	Necdet Ayaz	Turkey	14:18.38	
9	Marios Kassianidis	Cyprus	14:19.34	
10	Mohamed Ali Chouri	Tunisia	14:19.56	
11	Thierry Watrice	France	14:24.26	

=== 10,000 meters ===
12 September

Rank	Name	Nationality	Time	Notes
1st place, gold medalist(s)	Thierry Watrice	France	29:05.95	
2nd place, silver medalist(s)	Venanzio Ortis	Italy	29:12.89	
3rd place, bronze medalist(s)	Luis Adsuara	Spain	29:19.25	
4	Marios Kassianidis	Greece	29:25.09	
5	Abderrazak Bounour	Algeria	29:28.58	
6	Mohamed Chouri	Tunisia	29:50.44	
7	Necdet Ayaz	Turkey	30:05.22	
8	Larbi El Mouaden	Morocco	30:05.56	

=== Marathon ===
16 September

Rank	Name	Nationality	Time	Notes
1st place, gold medalist(s)	Mehmet Terzi	Turkey	2:22:32.9	
2nd place, silver medalist(s)	Ahmet Altun	Turkey	2:22:51.1	
3rd place, bronze medalist(s)	Honorato Hernández	Spain	2:23:15.0	
4	Michalis Kousis	Greece	2:24:43.4	
5	Eleuterio Antón	Spain	2:24:45.8	
6	Vito Basiliana	Italy	2:26:06.2	
7	Antonio Erotavo	Italy	2:27:48.4	
8	Georgios Afordakos	Greece	2:30:22.3	

=== 110 meters hurdles ===
16 September
Wind: +5.2 m/s

Rank	Name	Nationality	Time	Notes
1st place, gold medalist(s)	Javier Moracho	Spain	13.54w	
2nd place, silver medalist(s)	Carlos Sala	Spain	13.55w	
3rd place, bronze medalist(s)	Daniele Fontecchio	Italy	13.64w	
4	Gianni Tozzi	Italy	13.81w	
5	Mohamed-Ryad Benhaddad	Algeria	14.23w	
6	Hesham Makeen	Egypt	14.39w	
7	Saïd Kahia	Morocco	14.36w	
8	Ahmed Chiboub	Morocco	14.81w	

=== 400 meters hurdles ===
Heats – 12 September

Rank	Heat	Name	Nationality	Time	Notes
3	1	Luca Cosi	Italy	53.83	Q
2	2	José Alonso	Spain	52.94	Q
1	1	Carlos Azulay	Spain	53.01	Q

Final – 12 September

Rank	Name	Nationality	Time	Notes
1st place, gold medalist(s)	José Alonso	Spain	50.96	
2nd place, silver medalist(s)	Carlos Azulay	Spain	51.90	
3rd place, bronze medalist(s)	Ahmed Ghanem	Egypt	51.99	
4	Luca Cosi	Italy	53.04	
5	Georgios Vamvakas	Greece	53.38	
6	Rok Kopitar	Yugoslavia	53.61	
7	Khalid Reggoug	Morocco	53.79	
8	Khalifa Khémiri	Tunisia	54.55	

=== 3000 meters steeplechase ===
15 September

Rank	Name	Nationality	Time	Notes
1st place, gold medalist(s)	Joseph Mahmoud	France	8:19.29	
2nd place, silver medalist(s)	Domingo Ramón	Spain	8:19.60	
3rd place, bronze medalist(s)	Francisco Sánchez	Spain	8:20.67	
4	Filippos Filippou	Greece	8:24.01	
5	Arsenios Tsiminos	Greece	8:28.34	
6	Francesco Panetta	Italy	8:46.57	
7	Mehmet Genc	Turkey	8:51.00	
8	Sefa Het	Turkey	9:08.27	

=== 4 × 100 meters relay ===
16 September

Rank	Nation	Competitors	Time	Notes
1st place, gold medalist(s)	Italy	Pierfrancesco Pavoni, Carlo Simionato, Stefano Tilli, Pietro Mennea	38.76	
2nd place, silver medalist(s)	France	Thierry François, Marc Gasparoni, Antoine Richard, Jean-Jacques Boussemart	39.54	
3rd place, bronze medalist(s)	Greece	Aggelos Angelidis, Theodoros Gatzios, Nikolaos Hatzinikolau, Kosmas Stratos	40.31	
4	Algeria	Abdeslam Kaddouri, Ali Bakhta, Djamel Boudebidah, Brahim Amour	40.60	

=== 4 × 400 meters relay ===
16 September

Rank	Nation	Competitors	Time	Notes
1st place, gold medalist(s)	France	Jean-Jacques Février, Hector Llatser, Jean-Jacques Boussemart, Aldo Canti	3:04.38	
2nd place, silver medalist(s)	Italy	Roberto Ribaud, Donato Sabia, Mauro Zuliani, Daniele D'Amico	3:04.54	
3rd place, bronze medalist(s)	Spain	Antonio Sánchez, Benjamín González, José Alonso, Ángel Heras	3:06.54	
4	Yugoslavia	Ismail Mačev, Željko Knapić, Rok Kopitar, Slobodan Popović	3:07.00	
5	Morocco	Saïd M'Hand, Mohamed Hafid Eddine, Abdelali Kasbane, Faouzi Lahbi	3:08.64	
6	Algeria		3:09.49	
7	Tunisia		3:10.96	

=== 20 kilometers walk ===
Rank	Name	Nationality	Time	Notes
1st place, gold medalist(s)	Maurizio Damilano	Italy	1:23:19	
2nd place, silver medalist(s)	Gérard Lelièvre	France	1:24:32	
3rd place, bronze medalist(s)	Sergio Spagnulo	Italy	1:27:54	
4	Jorge Llopart	Spain	1:30:11	
5	Benamar Kachkouche	Algeria	1:30:20	
6	Aristidis Karageorgos	Greece	1:30:34	
7	Burhan Vurgun	Turkey	1:30:48	
9	Kariagiannis	Greece	1:31:09	

=== High jump ===
16 September

Rank	Name	Nationality	2.05	2.10	2.13	2.16	2.19	2.22	2.24	2.26	Result	Notes
1st place, gold medalist(s)	Othmane Belfaa	Algeria									2.26	
2nd place, silver medalist(s)	Bernard Bachorz	France									2.26	
3rd place, bronze medalist(s)	Franck Verzy	France									2.22	
4	Luca Toso	Italy									2.19	
5	Dimitrios Kattis	Greece									2.19	
6	Hrvoje Fižuleto	Yugoslavia									2.13	
7	Roberto Cabrejas	Spain	o	o		xxx					2.13	
8	Mohamed Aghlal	Morocco									2.13	

=== Pole vault ===
15 September

Rank	Name	Nationality	4.95	5.10	5.30	5.55	Result	Notes
1st place, gold medalist(s)	Patrick Abada	France					5.55	
2nd place, silver medalist(s)	Serge Leveur	France					5.30	
3rd place, bronze medalist(s)	Mauro Barella	Italy					5.10	
4	Viktor Drechsel	Italy					5.10	
5	Andreas Tsonis	Greece					4.95	
	Alberto Ruiz	Spain	–	xxx			NM	

=== Long jump ===
15 September

Rank	Name	Nationality	#1	#2	#3	#4	#5	#6	Result	Notes
1st place, gold medalist(s)	Dimitrios Delifotis	Greece							7.77	
2nd place, silver medalist(s)	Antonio Corgos	Spain	7.56	7.49	7.75	x	x	7.59	7.75	
3rd place, bronze medalist(s)	Marco Piochi	Italy							7.74	
4	Mohamed Abdulla Abdelaslam	Libya							7.72	
5	Giovanni Evangelisti	Italy							7.71	
6	Mohamed Gharib	Egypt							7.37	
7	Bachir Messikh	Algeria							7.36	
8	Mohamed Hicham Lyagoubi	Morocco							7.12	

=== Triple jump ===
13 September

Rank	Name	Nationality	Result	Notes
1st place, gold medalist(s)	Dimitrios Mikhas	Greece	16.70	
2nd place, silver medalist(s)	Dario Badinelli	Italy	16.50	
3rd place, bronze medalist(s)	Christian Valétudie	France	16.33	
4	Fathi Aboud	Libya	15.56	
5	Ioannis Kyriazis	Greece	15.43	
6	Saïd Saad	Algeria	15.36	
7	El Moustafa Aouchar	Morocco	15.07	

=== Shot put ===
Rank	Name	Nationality	Result	Notes
1st place, gold medalist(s)	Jovan Lazarević	Yugoslavia	20.05	
2nd place, silver medalist(s)	Alessandro Andrei	Italy	19.61	
3rd place, bronze medalist(s)	Vladimir Milić	Yugoslavia	19.40	
4	Marco Montelatici	Italy	18.70	
5	Ahmed Chata	Egypt	17.84	
6	Mohamed Fahiti	Morocco	17.27	

=== Discus throw ===
15 September

Rank	Name	Nationality	#1	#2	#3	#4	#5	#6	Result	Notes
1st place, gold medalist(s)	Kostas Georgakopoulos	Greece							62.58	
2nd place, silver medalist(s)	Mohamed Naguib Hamed	Egypt							61.24	
3rd place, bronze medalist(s)	Marco Martino	Italy							58.72	
4	Marco Bucci	Italy							57.98	
5	Sinesio Garrachón	Spain	52.58	54.78	54.78	57.06	x	55.28	57.06	
6	Abderrazak Ben Hassine	Tunisia							55.22	

=== Hammer throw ===
13 September

Rank	Name	Nationality	#1	#2	#3	#4	#5	#6	Result	Notes
1st place, gold medalist(s)	Giampaolo Urlando	Italy							69.64	
2nd place, silver medalist(s)	Orlando Bianchini	Italy							68.58	
3rd place, bronze medalist(s)	Raúl Jimeno	Spain	67.16	x	x	x	–	x	67.16	
4	Walter Ciofani	France							67.04	
5	Hakim Toumi	Algeria							66.64	
6	Ioannis Makos	Greece							65.58	
7	Papagiotis Kremastiotis	Greece							65.18	
8	Srećko Štiglić	Yugoslavia							63.48	

=== Javelin throw ===
Rank	Name	Nationality	Result	Notes
1st place, gold medalist(s)	Agostino Ghesini	Italy	79.28	
2nd place, silver medalist(s)	Charlus Bertimon	France	78.12	
3rd place, bronze medalist(s)	Tarek Chaabani	Tunisia	73.28	
4	Ioannis Peristeris	Greece	71.94	
5	Mohamed Karakhi	Morocco	71.26	
6	Ahmed Mahour Bacha	Algeria	67.78	

=== Decathlon ===
12–13 September

The highest mark recorded in each event is highlighted in yellow

Rank	Athlete	Nationality	100m	LJ	SP	HJ	400m	110m H	DT	PV	JT	1500m	Points	Notes
1st place, gold medalist(s)	Joško Vlašić	Yugoslavia	11.61	6.75	13.37	1.97	51.27	14.82	42.02	3.90	59.18	4:25.91	7440	
2nd place, silver medalist(s)	Hubert Indra	Italy	11.69	6.63	13.01	1.91	51.73	15.26	39.18	4.40	59.04	4:27.86	7314	
3rd place, bronze medalist(s)	Mohamed Bensaad	Algeria	11.53	6.62	10.70	1.88	49.74	15.11	37.62	4.60	50.28	4:24.41	7197	
4	Gérardo Trujillano	Spain	11.16	6.86	11.57	1.88	50.67	15.13	31.22	4.00	50.54	4:24.28	7065	
5	Ioannis Mavrikis	Greece	11.54	97.01	13.55	1.97	51.60	16.73	35.90	4.30	52.68	4:52.58	7054	
6	Eduardo Lobo	Spain	11.46	6.84	13.25	1.91	52.42	14.83	40.12	3.60	43.44	4:41.77	6955	

== Women's results ==
=== 100 meters ===
Wind: +0.7 m/s

Rank	Name	Nationality	Time	Notes
1st place, gold medalist(s)	Rose-Aimée Bacoul	France	11.19	
2nd place, silver medalist(s)	Marisa Masullo	Italy	11.47	
3rd place, bronze medalist(s)	Marie-France Loval	France	11.62	
4	Dijana Ištvanović	Yugoslavia	11.92	
5	Marina Flajšman	Yugoslavia	12.19	
6	Sibel Tercan	Turkey	12.44	
7	Fatima Braiz	Morocco	12.67	

=== 200 meters ===
Wind: +2.8 m/s

Rank	Name	Nationality	Time	Notes
1st place, gold medalist(s)	Rose-Aimée Bacoul	France	22.67w	
2nd place, silver medalist(s)	Liliane Gaschet	France	22.97w	
3rd place, bronze medalist(s)	Marisa Masullo	Italy	23.12w	
4	Dijana Ištvanović	Yugoslavia	23.91w	
5	Saša Kranjc	Yugoslavia	23.94w	
6	Semra Aksu	Turkey	23.96w	
7	Daniela Ferrian	Italy	23.99w	
8	Sibel Tercan	Turkey	25.12w	

=== 400 meters ===
Heats

Rank	Heat	Name	Nationality	Time	Notes
2	1	Cosetta Campana	Italy	54.51	Q
2	2	Erica Rossi	Italy	57.84	Q

Final

Rank	Name	Nationality	Time	Notes
1st place, gold medalist(s)	Raymonde Naigre	France	52.78	
2nd place, silver medalist(s)	Erica Rossi	Italy	53.83	
3rd place, bronze medalist(s)	Cosetta Campana	Italy	54.52	
4	Viviane Couedriau	France	54.97	
5	Elizabeta Božinovska	Yugoslavia	55.35	
6	Katica Mataković	Yugoslavia	56.06	
7	Georgia Troubouki	Greece	57.07	
8	Rachida Ferdjaoui	Algeria	58.61	

=== 800 meters ===
Heats – 13 September

Rank	Heat	Name	Nationality	Time	Notes
4	?	Maite Zúñiga	Spain	2:07.72	q

Final – 13 September

Rank	Name	Nationality	Time	Notes
1st place, gold medalist(s)	Nathalie Thoumas	France	2:07.06	
2nd place, silver medalist(s)	Slobodanka Čolović	Yugoslavia	2:07.34	
3rd place, bronze medalist(s)	Mirela Šket	Yugoslavia	2:07.70	
4	Gloria Pallé	Spain	2:07.72	
5	Letizia Magenti	Italy	2:08.58	
6	Sarra Touibi	Tunisia	2:10.14	
7	Zahra Bekkach	Morocco	2:10.14	
8	Maite Zúñiga	Spain	2:17.02	

=== 1500 meters ===
16 September

Rank	Name	Nationality	Time	Notes
1st place, gold medalist(s)	Agnese Possamai	Italy	4:13.58	
2nd place, silver medalist(s)	Marica Mršić	Yugoslavia	4:15.04	
3rd place, bronze medalist(s)	Gloria Pallé	Spain	4:18.69	
4	Hassania Darami	Morocco	4:24.24	
5	Maite Zúñiga	Spain	4:27.56	
6	Laila El Mhandi	Morocco	4:34.78	

=== 3000 meters ===
13 September

Rank	Name	Nationality	Time	Notes
1st place, gold medalist(s)	Agnese Possamai	Italy	9:15.64	
2nd place, silver medalist(s)	Marica Mršić	Yugoslavia	9:17.13	
3rd place, bronze medalist(s)	Pilar Fernández	Spain	9:24.96	
4	Hassania Darami	Morocco	9:39.13	
5	Neşe Çetin	Turkey	9:44.18	

=== 100 meters hurdles ===
Wind: +0.5 m/s

Rank	Name	Nationality	Time	Notes
1st place, gold medalist(s)	Michèle Chardonnet	France	13.21	
2nd place, silver medalist(s)	Elisavet Pantazi	Greece	13.42	
3rd place, bronze medalist(s)	Marie-Noëlle Savigny	France	13.44	
4	Simona Parmiggiani	Italy	13.84	
5	Semra Aksu	Turkey	14.17	
6	Chérifa Meskaoui	Morocco	14.44	

=== 400 meters hurdles ===
12 September

Rank	Name	Nationality	Time	Notes
1st place, gold medalist(s)	Nawal El Moutawakel	Morocco	56.59	
2nd place, silver medalist(s)	Giuseppina Cirulli	Italy	58.48	
3rd place, bronze medalist(s)	Mojca Šavle	Yugoslavia	59.41	
4	Rosa Colorado	Spain	1:01.31	
5	Basma Gharbi	Tunisia	1:03.17	
	Fatima Salahi	Morocco	DNF	

=== 4 × 100 meters relay ===
16 September

Rank	Nation	Competitors	Time	Notes
1st place, gold medalist(s)	France	Rose-Aimée Bacoul, Marie-France Loval, Marie-Christine Cazier, Liliane Gaschet	43.36	
2nd place, silver medalist(s)	Italy	Mary Busato, Daniela Ferrian, Marisa Masullo, Gisella Trombin	44.79	
3rd place, bronze medalist(s)	Morocco	Nawal El Moutawakel, Fatima Salahi, Fatima Braiz, Naima Benboubker	46.69	
4	Yugoslavia	Dijana Ištvanovic, Saša Kranjc, Marina Flajšman, Kornelija Šinkovic	46.98	

=== 4 × 400 meters relay ===
16 September

Rank	Nation	Competitors	Time	Notes
1st place, gold medalist(s)	Italy	Cosetta Campana, Giuseppina Cirulli, Letizia Magenti, Erica Rossi	3:33.63	
2nd place, silver medalist(s)	France	Liliane Gaschet, Viviane Couédriau, Raymonde Naigre, Natalie Thoumas	3:35.41	
3rd place, bronze medalist(s)	Yugoslavia	Katica Mataković, Slobodanka Čolović, Mirela Šket, Elizabeta Božinovska	3:37.87	
4	Morocco	Nawal El Moutawakel, Fatima Salahi, Fatima Braiz, Zahra Bekkach	3:38.87	

=== High jump ===
13 September

Rank	Name	Nationality	1.60	1.70	1.75	1.80	1.86	1.89	Result	Notes
1st place, gold medalist(s)	Maryse Éwanjé-Épée	France							1.89	
2nd place, silver medalist(s)	Biljana Bojović	Yugoslavia							1.86	
3rd place, bronze medalist(s)	Lidija Lapajne	Yugoslavia							1.86	
4	Sandra Dini	Italy							1.86	
5	Isabel Mozún	Spain	–	o	o	xxx			1.75	
6	Kaouther Akremi	Tunisia							1.75	
7	Mbarka Htettou	Morocco							1.60	

=== Long jump ===
12 September

Rank	Name	Nationality	#1	#2	#3	#4	#5	#6	Result	Notes
1st place, gold medalist(s)	Snežana Dančetović	Yugoslavia							6.30	
2nd place, silver medalist(s)	Naima Benboubker	Morocco							5.95	
3rd place, bronze medalist(s)	Antonella Capriotti	Italy							5.94	
4	Paolo Limardi	Italy							5.93	
5	Fatima Salahi	Morocco							5.93	
6	Estrella Roldán	Spain	5.74	5.89	5.72w	x	5.56	5.58	5.89	
7	Dalila Tayebi	Algeria							5.79	
8	Kaouther Akremi	Tunisia							5.62	

=== Shot put ===
Rank	Name	Nationality	Result	Notes
1st place, gold medalist(s)	Soultana Saroudi	Greece	18.01	
2nd place, silver medalist(s)	Simone Créantor	France	16.36	
3rd place, bronze medalist(s)	Souad Maloussi	Morocco	15.30	
4	Isabelle Accambray	France	14.77	
5	Aïcha Dahmous	Algeria	13.34	
6	Fausta Quintavalla	Italy	12.45	

=== Discus throw ===
Rank	Name	Nationality	Result	Notes
1st place, gold medalist(s)	Isabelle Accambray	France	53.70	
2nd place, silver medalist(s)	Catherine Beauvais	France	53.62	
3rd place, bronze medalist(s)	Renata Scaglia	Italy	53.34	
4	Zoubida Laayouni	Morocco	51.48	
5	Aïcha Dahmous	Algeria	45.30	
6	Chérifa Meskaoui	Morocco	40.40	

=== Javelin throw ===
Rank	Name	Nationality	Result	Notes
1st place, gold medalist(s)	Anna Verouli	Greece	61.62	
2nd place, silver medalist(s)	Fausta Quintavalla	Italy	59.08	
3rd place, bronze medalist(s)	Nadine Schoellkopf	France	52.54	
4	Fatima Belmghar	Morocco	44.16	
5	Elisavet Pandazi	Greece	33.24	
6	Esmeralda Pecchio	Italy	28.26	

=== Heptathlon ===
15–16 September

Rank	Athlete	Nationality	100m H	HJ	SP	200m	LJ	JT	800m	Points	Notes
1st place, gold medalist(s)	Chérifa Meskaoui	Morocco								5498	
2nd place, silver medalist(s)	Dalila Tayebi	Algeria								5456	
3rd place, bronze medalist(s)	Esmeralda Pecchio	Italy								5379	
4	Olga Armengol	Spain	15.58	1.66	10.55	25.81	5.65	35.56	2:21.69	5278	
5	Josefa López	Spain	15.22	1.72	9.21	25.86	5.61	35.96	2:21.62	5274	
6	Khadija Faiz	Morocco								4915	
7	Kaouther Akremi	Tunisia								4663	
8	Basma Gharbi	Tunisia								4483	
