= Athletics at the 1979 Mediterranean Games =

1979 Athletics at the Mediterranean Games

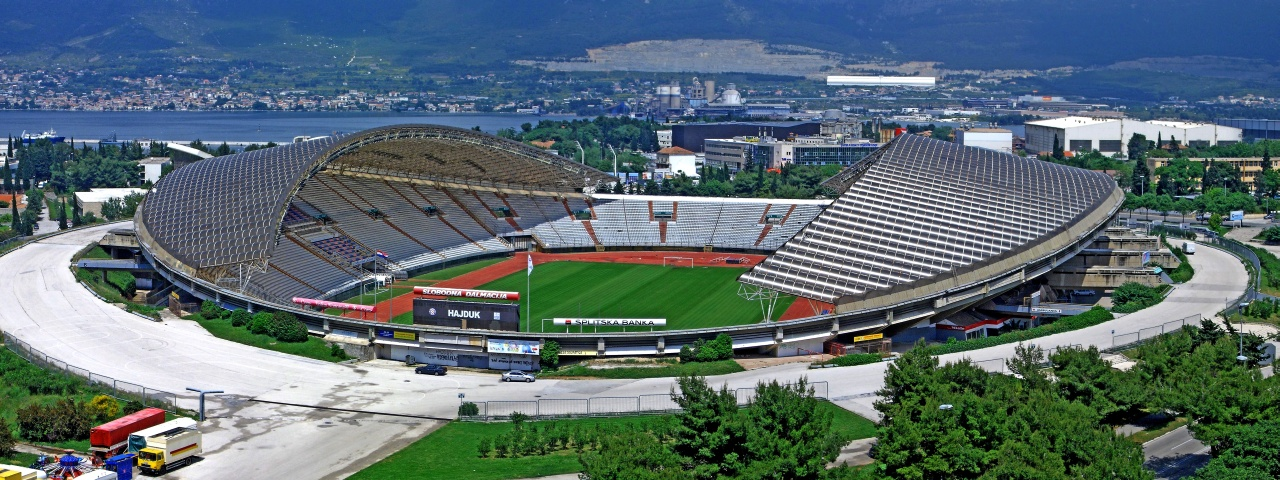
- Dates: 23–28 September
- Host city: (Socialist Federal Republic of Yugoslavia) Split
- Venue: Gradski stadion u Poljudu
- Events: 23 + 14
- Participation: 14 nations

Athletics at the 1979 Mediterranean Games were held in Split, Yugoslavia and took place from 23 September to the 28.

== Medal table ==
* Host nation (Yugoslavia)

Rank	Nation	Gold	Silver	Bronze	Total
1	Italy	13	12	8	33
2	France	13	8	3	24
3	Yugoslavia*	7	7	13	27
4	Greece	3	2	4	9
5	Algeria	1	2	4	7
6	Spain	0	2	3	5
7	Egypt	0	2	0	2
7	Tunisia	0	2	0	2
9	Turkey	0	0	1	1
Totals (9 entries)		37	37	36	110

== Medal summary ==
=== Men's events ===
Event	Gold		Silver		Bronze	
100 metres (wind: -0.6)	Pietro Mennea (ITA)	10.24	Gianfranco Lazzer (ITA)	10.47	Philippe Lejoncour (FRA)	10.56
200 metres (wind: +0.7 m/s)	Luciano Caravani (ITA)	20.74	Bernard Petitbois (FRA)	21.02	Georgios Tzouvaras (GRE)	21.14
400 metres	Francis Demarthon (FRA)	45.89 GR	Didier Dubois (FRA)	46.11	Josip Alebić (YUG)	46.24
800 metres	Dragan Životić (YUG)	1:45.20 GR	Abderrahmane Morceli (ALG)	1:46.38	Sotirios Moutsanas (GRE)	1:46.66
1500 metres	José Marajo (FRA)	3:41.00 GR	Dragan Zdravković (YUG)	3:41.22	Abderrahmane Morceli (ALG)	3:41.40
5000 metres	Luigi Zarcone (ITA)	13:45.11	Rachid Habchaoui (ALG)	13:47.24	El Hachemi Abdenouz (ALG)	13:57.55
10,000 metres	Abdelmadjid Mada (ALG)	28:33.08	Luigi Zarcone (ITA)	28:39.06	Rachid Habchaoui (ALG)	28:59.72
Marathon	Michalis Kousis (GRE)	2:06:53 GR	Marco Marchei (ITA)	2:07:15	Mehmet Terzi (TUR)	2:10:11
3000 m steeplechase	Mariano Scartezzini (ITA)	8:24.19	Domingo Ramón (ESP)	8:25.75	Philippe Gauthier (FRA)	8:27.26
110 metres hurdles (wind: -1.2 m/s)	Borisav Pisić (YUG)	13.85	Giuseppe Buttari (ITA)	13.88	Javier Moracho (ESP)	13.92
400 metres hurdles	Rok Kopitar (YUG)	49.70 GR	Claude Anicet (FRA)	50.85	Fulvio Zorn (ITA)	50.90
High jump	Massimo Di Giorgio (ITA)	2.26 m GR	Oscar Raise (ITA)	2.24 m	Danial Temim (YUG)	2.20 m
Pole vault	Philippe Houvion (FRA)	5.30 m GR	Jean-Michel Bellot (FRA)	5.30 m	Roger Oriol (ESP)	5.10 m
Long jump	Nenad Stekić (YUG)	8.21 m GR	Philippe Deroche (FRA)	8.04 m	Miljenko Rak (YUG)	7.62 m
Triple jump	Bernard Lamitié (FRA)	16.90 m GR	Miloš Srejović (YUG)	16.55 m	Milan Spasojević (YUG)	16.55 m
Shot put	Vladimir Milić (YUG)	20.58 m GR	Nagui Asaad (EGY)	19.70 m	Ivan Ivančić (YUG)	19.13 m
Discus throw	Armando De Vincentiis (ITA)	57.96 m	Hassan Ahmed Hamad (EGY)	56.06 m	Silvano Simeon (ITA)	55.06 m
Hammer throw	Giampaolo Urlando (ITA)	69.92 m GR	Edoardo Podberscek (ITA)	69.42 m	Srećko Štiglić (YUG)	68.56 m
Javelin throw	Penisio Lutui (FRA)	81.08 m GR	Tarek Chaabani (TUN)	78.42 m	Neđo Đurović (YUG)	76.72 m
Decathlon	Eric Motti (FRA)	7744 pts GR	Darko Cujnik (YUG)	7345 pt	Joško Vlašić (YUG)	7327 pt
20 km walk	Gérard Lelièvre (FRA)	1:23:51 GR	José Marín (ESP)	1:24:18	Carlo Mattioli (ITA)	1:24:56
4×100 metres relay	Italy; Gianfranco Lazzer; Luciano Caravani; Giovanni Grazioli; Pietro Mennea	39.27 GR	France; Philippe Lejoncour; Bernard Petitbois; Lucien Sainte-Rose; Antoine Richard	39.98	Yugoslavia; Janez Sagadin; Dragan Zarić; Aleksandar Popović; Borisav Pisić	40.53
4×400 metres relay	France; Jacques Fellice; Robert Froissart; Didier Dubois; Francis Demarthon	3:03.67 GR	Yugoslavia; Željko Knapić; Dragan Životić; Rok Kopitar; Josip Alebić	3:04.33	Italy; Alfonso Di Guida; Flavio Borghi; Stefano Malinverni; Roberto Tozzi	3:04.61

=== Women's events ===
Event	Gold		Silver		Bronze	
100 metres (wind: -1.0 m/s)	Chantal Réga (FRA)	11.48 GR	Marisa Masullo (ITA)	11.66	Laura Miano (ITA)	11.67
200 metres (wind: +1.2 m/s)	Marisa Masullo (ITA)	23.26 GR	Annie Alizé (FRA)	23.37	Claudine Mas (FRA)	24.03
400 metres	Jelica Štefančić (YUG)	52.96	Ana Guštin (YUG)	54.57	Georgia Troumbouki (GRE)	54.93
800 metres	Gabriella Dorio (ITA)	2:01.78 GR	Agnese Possamai (ITA)	2:03.73	Nađa Avdibašić (YUG)	2:04.03
1500 metres	Margherita Gargano (ITA)	4:06.71 GR	Gabriella Dorio (ITA)	4:07.07	Sakina Boutamine (ALG)	4:10.60
100 metres hurdles (wind: -3.0 m/s)	Laurence Elloy (FRA)	13.87	Elissavet Pantazi (GRE)	14.33	Patrizia Lombardo (ITA)	14.65
High jump	Sara Simeoni (ITA)	1.98 m GR	Donatella Bulfoni (ITA)	1.81 m	Lidija Benedetič (YUG)	1.75 m
Long jump	Maria Lambrou (GRE)	6.32 m GR	Snežana Dančetović (YUG)	6.20 m	Amanda Naval (ESP)	6.06 m
Shot put	Léone Bertimon (FRA)	16.80 m GR	Soultana Saroudi (GRE)	16.69 m	Cinzia Petrucci (ITA)	16.17 m
Discus throw	Renata Scaglia (ITA)	52.92 m GR	Fathia Jerbi (TUN)	49.24 m	Kosa Stojković (YUG)	48.82 m
Javelin throw	Sofia Sakorafa (GRE)	57.96 m GR	Fausta Quintavalla (ITA)	57.06 m	Borbala Menyhart (YUG)	54.50 m
Pentathlon	Florence Picaut (FRA)	4424 pt	Breda Lorenci (YUG)	4180 pt	Barbara Bachlechner (ITA)	3994 pt
4×100 metres relay	France; Annie Alizé; Emma Sulter; Claudine Mas; Chantal Réga	44.58 GR	Italy; Irma Galli; Patrizia Lombardo; Marisa Masullo; Laura Miano	45.32	Greece; Irini Pagdati; Alexandra Siulis; Elisavet Pantazi; Maroula Lambrou	46.17
4×400 metres relay	Yugoslavia; Jelica Pavličić; Nađa Avdibašić; Elizabeta Božinovska; Ana Guštin	3:38.91	France; Annie Alizé; Florence Picaut; Véronique Renties; Claudine Mas	3:56.84	–	

== Men's results ==
=== 100 meters ===
Heats – 23 September
Wind:
Heat 1: +3.6 m/s, Heat 2: +0.5 m/s

Rank	Heat	Name	Nationality	Time	Notes
1	2	Pietro Mennea	Italy	10.15	Q, GR
2	1	Gianfranco Lazzer	Italy	10.33	Q
3	1	Philippe Lejoncour	France	10.52	Q
4	1	Omar Ghizlat	Morocco	10.53	Q
5	1	Dragan Zarić	Yugoslavia	10.59	Q
6	2	Stratos Kosmas	Greece	10.62	Q
7	2	Antoine Richard	France	10.64	Q
8	2	Aleksandar Popović	Yugoslavia	10.66	Q
9	1	José Javier Arqués	Spain	10.74	
10	1	Nikos Hadjnicolaou	Greece	10.77	
11	2	Nabil Nahry	Syria	10.82	
12	2	Ángel Heras	Spain	10.93	
13	1	Alan Zammit	Malta	11.18	

Final – 24 September
Wind:
-0.6 m/s

Rank	Lane	Name	Nationality	Time	Notes
1st place, gold medalist(s)	3	Pietro Mennea	Italy	10.24	
2nd place, silver medalist(s)	4	Gianfranco Lazzer	Italy	10.47	
3rd place, bronze medalist(s)	2	Philippe Lejoncour	France	10.56	
4	5	Antoine Richard	France	10.70	
5	7	Omar Ghizlat	Morocco	10.73	
6	8	Aleksandar Popović	Yugoslavia	10.74	
7	1	Kosmas Stratos	Greece	10.79	
8	6	Dragan Zarić	Yugoslavia	10.90	

=== 200 meters ===
Heats – 25 September
Wind:
Heat 1: ? m/s, Heat 2: +1.7 m/s

Rank	Heat	Name	Nationality	Time	Notes
1	1	Bernard Petitbois	France	20.85	Q
2	1	Aleksandar Popović	Yugoslavia	21.04	Q
3	1	Omar Ghizlat	Morocco	21.25	Q
4	1	Georgios Tzouvaras	Greece	21.26	Q
1	2	Luciano Caravani	Italy	21.08	Q
2	2	Nabil Nahry	Syria	21.64	Q
3	2	Ángel Heras	Spain	21.76	Q
4	2	Theodoros Gatzios	Greece	22.82	Q

Final – 27 September

Wind: +0.7 m/s

Rank	Lane	Name	Nationality	Time	Notes
1st place, gold medalist(s)	4	Luciano Caravani	Italy	20.74	
2nd place, silver medalist(s)	3	Bernard Petitbois	France	21.02	
3rd place, bronze medalist(s)	7	Georgios Tzouvaras	Greece	21.14	
4	1	Omar Ghizlat	Morocco	21.14	
5	6	Aleksandar Popović	Yugoslavia	21.25	
6	8	Nabil Nahry	Syria	21.52	
7	5	Ángel Heras	Spain	21.63	
	2	Theodoros Gatzios	Greece	DNS	

=== 400 meters ===
Heats – 23 September

Rank	Heat	Name	Nationality	Time	Notes
1	1	Josip Alebić	Yugoslavia	46.68	Q
2	1	Didier Dubois	France	46.81	Q
3	1	Roberto Tozzi	Italy	47.02	Q
4	1	Nafe Mersaal	Egypt	47.09	Q
5	1	Benjamín González	Spain	47.29	
6	2	Stefano Malinverni	Italy	50.19	Q
7	2	Panagiotis Stefanopoulos	Greece	50.51	Q
8	2	Željko Knapić	Yugoslavia	50.57	Q
9	1	Darmanin	Morocco	52.25	
10	2	Francis Demarthon	France	53.09	Q

Final – 25 September

Rank	Name	Nationality	Time	Notes
1st place, gold medalist(s)	Francis Demarthon	France	45.89	
2nd place, silver medalist(s)	Didier Dubois	France	46.11	
3rd place, bronze medalist(s)	Josip Alebić	Yugoslavia	46.24	
4	Željko Knapić	Yugoslavia	46.42	
5	Roberto Tozzi	Italy	46.80	
6	Nafe Mersaal	Egypt	46.87	
7	Stefano Malinverni	Italy	47.00	
8	Panagiotis Stefanopoulos	Greece	47.59	

=== 800 meters ===
Heats – 23 September

Rank	Heat	Name	Nationality	Time	Notes
1	1	Sotirios Moutsanas	Greece	1:48.9	Q
2	1	Sermet Timurlenk	Turkey	1:49.3	Q
3	1	Milovan Savić	Yugoslavia	1:49.6	Q
4	1	Roqui Sanchez	France	1:49.7	Q
5	1	Mehdi Aidet	Algeria	1:50.0	
6	1	Adorno Corradini	Italy	1:50.38	
1	2	Dragan Životić	Yugoslavia	1:51.60	Q
2	2	Abderrahmane Morceli	Algeria	1:51.8	Q
3	2	Mohamed Alouini	Tunisia	1:52.1	Q
4	2	Colomán Trabado	Spain	1:52.17	Q
5	2	Stavros Mermingis	Greece	1:52.3	

Final – 25 September

Rank	Name	Nationality	Time	Notes
1st place, gold medalist(s)	Dragan Životić	Yugoslavia	1:45.20	GR
2nd place, silver medalist(s)	Abderrahmane Morceli	Algeria	1:46.38	
3rd place, bronze medalist(s)	Sotirios Moutsanas	Greece	1:46.66	
4	Milovan Savić	Yugoslavia	1.46.8	
5	Colomán Trabado	Spain	1:47.37	
6	Sermet Timurlenk	Turkey	1:47.79	
7	Mohamed Alouini	Tunisia	1:48.2	
8	Roqui Sanchez	France	1:50.3	

=== 1500 meters ===
Rank	Name	Nationality	Time	Notes
1st place, gold medalist(s)	José Marajo	France	3:41.00	GR
2nd place, silver medalist(s)	Dragan Zdravković	Yugoslavia	3:41.22	
3rd place, bronze medalist(s)	Abderrahmane Morceli	Algeria	3:41.40	
4	Vittorio Fontanella	Italy	3:42.08	
5	Christos Papachristos	Greece	3:42.3	
6	Mehdi Aidet	Algeria	3:42.7	
7	Boško Božinović	Yugoslavia	3:43.0	
8	Sermet Timurlenk	Turkey	3:44.0	
9	Alexandre Gonzalez	France	3:44.3	
10	Fotios Kourtis	Greece	3:45.1	
11	Fulvio Costa	Italy	3:50.41	
12	Nabil Chouéry	Lebanon	3:50.9	

=== 5000 meters ===
Rank	Name	Nationality	Time	Notes
1st place, gold medalist(s)	Luigi Zarcone	Italy	13:45.11	
2nd place, silver medalist(s)	Rachid Habchaoui	Algeria	13:47.24	
3rd place, bronze medalist(s)	El Hachemi Abdenouz	Algeria	13:57.55	
4	Saïd Aouita	Morocco	14:06.6	
5	Piero Selvaggio	Italy	14:07.19	
6	Stanko Lisec	Yugoslavia	14:10.6	
7	Necdet Ayaz	Turkey	14:16.0	
8	Vojko Arzenšek	Yugoslavia	14:23.6	

=== 10,000 meters ===
23 September

Rank	Name	Nationality	Time	Notes
1st place, gold medalist(s)	Abdelmadjid Mada	Algeria	28:33.08	
2nd place, silver medalist(s)	Luigi Zarcone	Italy	28:39.06	
3rd place, bronze medalist(s)	Rachid Habchaoui	Algeria	28:59.72	
4	Dušan Janićijević	Yugoslavia	29:17.3	
5	Jean-Paul Gomez	France	29:38.7	
6	Slavko Kuzmanović	Yugoslavia	29:55.4	
7	Spyridon Nakos	Greece	29:56.6	
	Necdet Ayaz	Turkey	DNF	

=== Marathon ===
28 September
The results are unofficial as the distance was 41.3 km, thus shorter than the required 42.195 kilometres.

Rank	Name	Nationality	Time	Notes
1st place, gold medalist(s)	Michael Koussis	Greece	2:06:53*	
2nd place, silver medalist(s)	Marco Marchei	Italy	2:07:15*	
3rd place, bronze medalist(s)	Mehmet Terzi	Turkey	2:10:11*	
4	Numan Ukić	Yugoslavia	2:11:18*	
5	Orlando Pizzolato	Italy	2:12:33*	
6	Anastasios Psathas	Greece	2:13:56*	
7	Abel Perau	Spain	2:14:15*	
8	Pero Budija	Yugoslavia	2:14:15*	
9	Veli Balli	Turkey	2:14:50*	
10	Mahni Houcin	Tunisia	?:??:??*	
	Guy Connan	France	DNF	
	Fernand Kolbeck	France	DNF	
	Abdelmajid Mada	Algeria	DNF	

=== 110 meters hurdles ===
28 September
Wind: -1.2 m/s

Rank	Name	Nationality	Time	Notes
1st place, gold medalist(s)	Borisav Pisić	Yugoslavia	13.85	
2nd place, silver medalist(s)	Giuseppe Buttari	Italy	13.88	
3rd place, bronze medalist(s)	Javier Moracho	Spain	13.92	
4	Emile Raybois	France	14.05	
5	Petros Evripidou	Greece	14.09	
6	Petar Vukićević	Yugoslavia	14.14	
7	Carlos Sala	Spain	14.33	
8	Ilhan Agibas	Turkey	15.05	

=== 400 meters hurdles ===
24 September

Rank	Lane	Name	Nationality	Time	Notes
1st place, gold medalist(s)	3	Rok Kopitar	Yugoslavia	49.70	GR
2nd place, silver medalist(s)	6	Claude Anicet	France	50.85	
3rd place, bronze medalist(s)	1	Fulvio Zorn	Italy	50.90	
4	5	Giorgio Ballati	Italy	51.18	
5	3	Georgios Rambotas	Greece	51.40	
6	8	Antonio Rivero	Spain	51.41	
7	7	Janez Penka	Yugoslavia	52.98	

=== 3000 meters steeplechase ===
27 September

Rank	Name	Nationality	Time	Notes
1st place, gold medalist(s)	Mariano Scartezzini	Italy	8:24.19	
2nd place, silver medalist(s)	Domingo Ramón	Spain	8:25.75	
3rd place, bronze medalist(s)	Philippe Gauthier	France	8:27.26	
4	Bilko Kačar	Yugoslavia	8:32.59	
5	Nikolaos Chalatsis	Greece	8:33.97	
6	Lahcene Babaci	Algeria	8:39.9	
7	Michele Cinà	Italy	8:40.6	
8	Petar Svet	Yugoslavia	8:55.9	
9	Abderrazak Bounour	Algeria	8:59.9	

=== 4 × 100 meters relay ===
28 September

Rank	Nation	Competitors	Time	Notes
1st place, gold medalist(s)	Italy	Gianfranco Lazzer, Luciano Caravani, Giovanni Grazioli, Pietro Mennea	39.27	GR
2nd place, silver medalist(s)	France	Philippe Lejoncour, Antoine Richard, Lucien Sainte-Rose, Bernard Petitbois	39.98	
3rd place, bronze medalist(s)	Yugoslavia	Janez Sagadin, Dragan Zarić, Aleksandar Popović, Borisav Pisić	40.53	
4	Greece		41.12	
5	Spain	Javier Moracho, Carlos Sala, José Javier Arqués, Ángel Heras	41.33	

=== 4 × 400 meters relay ===
28 September

Rank	Nation	Competitors	Time	Notes
1st place, gold medalist(s)	France	Jacques Fellice, Robert Froissart, Didier Dubois, Francis Demarthon	3:03.67	GR
2nd place, silver medalist(s)	Yugoslavia	Željko Knapić, Dragan Životić, Rok Kopitar, Josip Alebić	3:04.33	
3rd place, bronze medalist(s)	Italy	Alfonso Di Guida, Flavio Borghi, Stefano Malinverni, Roberto Tozzi	3:04.61	
4	Spain	Antonio Rivero, Ángel Heras, Benjamín González, Colomán Trabado	3:11.2	

=== 20 kilometers walk ===
24 September

Rank	Name	Nationality	Time	Notes
1st place, gold medalist(s)	Gérard Lelièvre	France	1:23:51	GR
2nd place, silver medalist(s)	José Marín	Spain	1:24:18	
3rd place, bronze medalist(s)	Carlo Mattioli	Italy	1:24:56	
4	Giorgio Damilano	Italy	1:25:31	
5	Jorge Llopart	Spain	1:28:59	
6	Dominique Guebey	France	1:30:09	
7	Vinko Galušić	Yugoslavia	1:34:56	
8	Lazo Pejčić	Yugoslavia	1:37:05	

=== High jump ===
28 September

Rank	Name	Nationality	Result	Notes
1st place, gold medalist(s)	Massimo Di Giorgio	Italy	2.26	GR
2nd place, silver medalist(s)	Oscar Raise	Italy	2.26	
3rd place, bronze medalist(s)	Danial Temim	Yugoslavia	2.20	
4	Francis Agbo	France	2.20	
5	Dimitrios Patronis	Greece	2.17	
6	Frank Bonnet	France	2.17	
7	Abdelhamid Sahil	Algeria	2.17	
8	Ekrem Özdamar	Turkey	2.14	
9	Vaso Komnenić	Yugoslavia	2.14	

=== Pole vault ===
27 September

Rank	Name	Nationality	4.80	5.00	5.10	5.20	5.30	5.45	5.50	Result	Notes
1st place, gold medalist(s)	Philippe Houvion	France					o	xxx		5.30	GR
2nd place, silver medalist(s)	Jean-Michel Bellot	France	–	–	xxo	–	xxo	–	xxx	5.30	
3rd place, bronze medalist(s)	Roger Oriol	Spain	o	o	o	xxx				5.10	
4	Dimitrios Kyteas	Greece								5.00	
5	Vincenzo Bellone	Italy								4.80	
	Miran Bizjak	Yugoslavia								NM	
	Želimir Šarcevic	Yugoslavia								NM	

=== Long jump ===
27 September

Rank	Name	Nationality	#1	#2	#3	#4	#5	#6	Result	Notes
1st place, gold medalist(s)	Nenad Stekić	Yugoslavia	8.09	8.01	8.04	7.89	8.21	8.10	8.21	GR
2nd place, silver medalist(s)	Philippe Deroche	France	7.63	8.04	7.68	7.77	x	x	8.04	
3rd place, bronze medalist(s)	Miljenko Rak	Yugoslavia							7.62	
4	Gilbert Zante	France							7.59	
5	Carlo Arrighi	Italy							7.51	
6	Evangelos Tsoulias	Greece							7.29	
7	Temel Erbek	Turkey							7.10	

=== Triple jump ===
27 September

Rank	Name	Nationality	#1	#2	#3	#4	#5	#6	Result	Notes
1st place, gold medalist(s)	Bernard Lamitié	France							16.90	GR
2nd place, silver medalist(s)	Miloš Srejović	Yugoslavia							16.55	
3rd place, bronze medalist(s)	Milan Spasojević	Yugoslavia							16.55	
4	Christian Valétudie	France							16.50	
5	Roberto Mazzucato	Italy							16.37	
6	José Luis Rodríguez	Spain	x	15.77	15.44	16.18	16.16	16.35	16.35	
7	Temel Erbek	Turkey							15.65	
8	Paolo Piapan	Italy							15.44	

=== Shot put ===
24 September

Rank	Name	Nationality	Result	Notes
1st place, gold medalist(s)	Vladimir Milić	Yugoslavia	20.58	GR
2nd place, silver medalist(s)	Nagui Yusuf Assad	Egypt	19.70	
3rd place, bronze medalist(s)	Ivan Ivančić	Yugoslavia	19.13	
4	Luc Viudès	France	18.93	
5	Angelo Groppelli	Italy	18.46	
6	Luigi De Santis	Italy	17.91	
7	Ali Fayez Emad	Egypt	17.20	
8	Mohmed Fahiti	Morocco	15.00	

=== Discus throw ===
Rank	Name	Nationality	Result	Notes
1st place, gold medalist(s)	Armando De Vincentiis	Italy	57.96	
2nd place, silver medalist(s)	Hassan Ahmed Hamad	Egypt	56.06	
3rd place, bronze medalist(s)	Silvano Simeon	Italy	55.06	
4	Abderrazak Benhassine	Tunisia	54.84	
5	Dimitar Marčeta	Yugoslavia	53.38	
6	Vladimir Milić	Yugoslavia	52.90	
7	Mohmed Fahiti	Morocco	46.12	

=== Hammer throw ===
25 September

Rank	Name	Nationality	Result	Notes
1st place, gold medalist(s)	Giampaolo Urlando	Italy	69.92	GR
2nd place, silver medalist(s)	Edoardo Podberscek	Italy	69.42	
3rd place, bronze medalist(s)	Srećko Štiglić	Yugoslavia	68.56	
4	Vassilios Magganas	Greece	63.56	
5	Dražen Goijć	Yugoslavia	61.94	

=== Javelin throw ===
Rank	Name	Nationality	Result	Notes
1st place, gold medalist(s)	Penisio Lutui	France	81.08	GR
2nd place, silver medalist(s)	Tarek Chaabani	Tunisia	78.42	
3rd place, bronze medalist(s)	Neđo Đurović	Yugoslavia	76.72	
4	Ioannis Peristeris	Greece	74.44	
5	Miran Globevnik	Yugoslavia	65.52	
	Vincenzo Marchetti	Italy	DNS	

=== Decathlon ===
24–25 September

The highest mark recorded in each event is highlighted in yellow

Rank	Athlete	Nationality	100m	LJ	SP	HJ	400m	110m H	DT	PV	JT	1500m	Points	Notes
1st place, gold medalist(s)	Eric Motti	France	11.35	7.30	14.17	2.09	49.85	15.46	41.32	4.15	63.30	4:44.2	7744	GR
2nd place, silver medalist(s)	Darko Cujnik	Yugoslavia	11.30	6.90	13.39	1.86	49.50	16.08	41.58	3.70	64.06	4:33.7	7345	
3rd place, bronze medalist(s)	Joško Vlašić	Yugoslavia	11.56	7.30	13.44	1.97	51.30	15.36	41.60	3.30	57.30	4:24.3	7327	
4	Hubert Indra	Italy	11.72	6.64	13.52	1.89	52.31	15.76	39.60	4.30	57.62	4:40.2	7135	
5	Elie Sfeir	Lebanon	11.81	6.55	12.92	1.86	53.17	16.60	34.22	3.40	55.18	4:39.00	6548	
6	Stefanos Simeonidis	Greece	11.52	7.19	11.07	1.89	52.64	17.32	33.82	4.00	44.34	4:54.8	6522	
	Konstantinos Kostis	Greece	11.29	7.26	13.56	2.01	53.03	15.34	39.84	?	DNS	–	DNF	

== Women's results ==
=== 100 meters ===
Heats – 24 September
Wind:
Heat 1: +0.6 m/s, Heat 2: ? m/s

Rank	Heat	Name	Nationality	Time	Notes
1	2	Chantal Réga	France	11.79	Q
1	1	Marisa Masullo	Italy	11.80	Q
2	2	Laura Miano	Italy	11.92	Q
4	1	Dolores Vives	Spain	12.22	q

Final – 24 September
Wind:
-1.0 m/s

Rank	Name	Nationality	Time	Notes
1st place, gold medalist(s)	Chantal Réga	France	11.48	GR
2nd place, silver medalist(s)	Marisa Masullo	Italy	11.66	
3rd place, bronze medalist(s)	Laura Miano	Italy	11.67	
4	Annie Alizé	France	11.71	
5	Dejana Sokač	Yugoslavia	11.97	
6	Nawal El Moutawakel	Morocco	12.13	
7	Dolores Vives	Spain	12.23	
8	Verica Petrović	Yugoslavia	12.26	

=== 200 meters ===
27 September
Wind:
+1.2 m/s

Rank	Lane	Name	Nationality	Time	Notes
1st place, gold medalist(s)	2	Marisa Masullo	Italy	23.26	
2nd place, silver medalist(s)	4	Annie Alizé	France	23.37	
3rd place, bronze medalist(s)	1	Claudine Mas	France	24.03	
4	3	Verica Petrović	Yugoslavia	24.64	
5	8	Nawal El Moutawakel	Morocco	24.64	
6	7	Dolores Vives	Spain	24.97	
	6	Dejana Sokač	Yugoslavia	DNF	

=== 400 meters ===
Rank	Name	Nationality	Time	Notes
1st place, gold medalist(s)	Jelica Pavličić	Yugoslavia	52.96	
2nd place, silver medalist(s)	Ana Guštin	Yugoslavia	54.57	
3rd place, bronze medalist(s)	Georgia Troumbouki	Greece	54.93	
4	Sarra Touibi	Tunisia	56.75	

=== 800 meters ===
25 September

Rank	Name	Nationality	Time	Notes
1st place, gold medalist(s)	Gabriella Dorio	Italy	2:01.78	GR
2nd place, silver medalist(s)	Agnese Possamai	Italy	2:03.73	
3rd place, bronze medalist(s)	Nađa Avdibašić	Yugoslavia	2:04.03	
4	Rosa Ochandiano	Spain	2:07.2	
5	Zora Tomecić	Yugoslavia	2:08.6	
6	Hassania Darami	Morocco	2:09.4	
7	Neşe Çetin	Turkey	2:11.7	

=== 1500 meters ===
28 September

Rank	Name	Nationality	Time	Notes
1st place, gold medalist(s)	Margherita Gargano	Italy	4:06.71	GR
2nd place, silver medalist(s)	Gabriella Dorio	Italy	4:07.07	
3rd place, bronze medalist(s)	Sakina Boutamine	Algeria	4:10.60	
4	Mercedes Calleja	Spain	4:15.4	
5	Véronique Renties	France	4:16.5	
6	Breda Pergar	Yugoslavia	4:16.8	
7	Rosa Ochandiamo	Spain	4:17.5	
8	Hassania Darami	Morocco	4:18.3	

=== 100 meters hurdles ===
Wind: -3.0 m/s

Rank	Name	Nationality	Time	Notes
1st place, gold medalist(s)	Laurence Elloy	France	13.87	
2nd place, silver medalist(s)	Elizavet Pantazi	Greece	14.33	
3rd place, bronze medalist(s)	Patrizia Lombardo	Italy	14.65	
4	Margita Papić	Yugoslavia	14.73	
5	Irina Pagdati	Greece	14.81	
6	Breda Lorenci	Yugoslavia	14.97	

=== 4 × 100 meters relay ===
28 September

Rank	Lane	Nation	Competitors	Time	Notes
1st place, gold medalist(s)	3	France	Annie Alizé, Emma Sulter, Claudine Mas, Chantal Réga	44.58	GR
2nd place, silver medalist(s)	1	Italy	Irma Galli, Patrizia Lombardo, Marisa Masullo, Laura Miano	45.32	
3rd place, bronze medalist(s)	2	Greece	Irini Pagdati, Alexandra Siulis, Elisavet Pantazi, Maroula Lambrou	46.17	
4	4	Yugoslavia		46.23	

=== 4 × 400 meters relay ===
28 September

Rank	Nation	Competitors	Time	Notes
1st place, gold medalist(s)	Yugoslavia	Jelica Pavličić, Nađa Avdibašić, Elizabeta Božinovska, Ana Guštin	3:38.91	
2nd place, silver medalist(s)	France	Annie Alizé, Florence Picaut, Véronique Renties, Claudine Mas	3:56.84	

=== High jump ===
25 September

Rank	Name	Nationality	1.60	1.70	1.75	1.81	1.84	1.90	1.95	1.98	2.02	Result	Notes
1st place, gold medalist(s)	Sara Simeoni	Italy	–	–	–	–	o	o	o	xo	xxx	1.98	GR
2nd place, silver medalist(s)	Donatella Bulfoni	Italy										1.81	
3rd place, bronze medalist(s)	Lidija Benedetič	Yugoslavia										1.75	
4	Biljana Bojović	Yugoslavia										1.75	
5	Panteli Panagiotou	Greece										1.70	
6	Kaouther Akremi	Tunisia										1.70	
7	Afitap Sahin	Turkey										1.60	

=== Long jump ===
24 September

Rank	Name	Nationality	#1	#2	#3	#4	#5	#6	Result	Notes
1st place, gold medalist(s)	Maroula Lambrou	Greece							6.32	GR
2nd place, silver medalist(s)	Snežana Dančetović	Yugoslavia							6.20	
3rd place, bronze medalist(s)	Amanda Naval	Spain	5.85	5.77	x	6.06	5.74	6.03	6.06	
4	Marcella Iacovelli	Italy							6.04	
5	Barbara Norello	Italy							5.89	
6	Kaouther Akremi	Tunisia							5.72	
7	Luciana Vinazza	Yugoslavia							5.69	

=== Shot put ===
Rank	Name	Nationality	Result	Notes
1st place, gold medalist(s)	Léone Bertimon	France	16.80	GR
2nd place, silver medalist(s)	Soultana Saroudi	Greece	16.69	
3rd place, bronze medalist(s)	Cinzia Petrucci	Italy	16.17	
4	Mirjana Tufegdžić	Yugoslavia	15.34	
5	Marta Gozo	Yugoslavia	15.07	

=== Discus throw ===
23 September

Rank	Name	Nationality	#1	#2	#3	#4	#5	#6	Result	Notes
1st place, gold medalist(s)	Renata Scaglia	Italy	44.56	49.06	52.92	x	51.12	51.46	52.92	GR
2nd place, silver medalist(s)	Fethia Jerbi	Tunisia							49.24	
3rd place, bronze medalist(s)	Kosa Stojković	Yugoslavia							48.82	
4	Zoubida Laayouni	Morocco							45.88	
5	Encarnación Gambus	Spain	40.34	43.26	43.04	x	x	41.36	43.26	
6	Soultana Saroudi	Greece							42.54	
7	Nevenka Mrinjek	Yugoslavia							42.34	

=== Javelin throw ===
Rank	Name	Nationality	Result	Notes
1st place, gold medalist(s)	Sofia Sakorafa	Greece	57.96	GR
2nd place, silver medalist(s)	Fausta Quintavalla	Italy	57.06	
3rd place, bronze medalist(s)	Borbala Menjhart	Yugoslavia	54.50	
4	Giuliana Amici	Italy	52.00	
5	Anna Verouli	Greece	50.92	
6	Aljana Kovač	Yugoslavia	45.62	

=== Pentathlon ===
The highest mark recorded in each event is highlighted in yellow

Rank	Athlete	Nationality	100m H	SP	HJ	LJ	800m	Points	Notes
1st place, gold medalist(s)	Florence Picaut	France	13.69	13.13	1.78	6.10	2:20.0	4424	
2nd place, silver medalist(s)	Breda Lorenci	Yugoslavia	14.39	13.68	1.72	5.58	2:21.1	4180	
3rd place, bronze medalist(s)	Barbara Bachlechner	Italy	14.44	10.54	1.72	5.91	2:26.0	3994	
4	Lidija Benedetič	Yugoslavia	15.10	9.50	1.80	5.75	2:28.6	3862	
5	Ana Pérez	Spain	15.14	8.38	1.74	5.76	2:17.8	3852	NR
