= Italy at the 1983 Mediterranean Games =

- IOC code: ITA
- NOC: Italian National Olympic Committee

in Casablanca
- Medals Ranked 1st: Gold 53 Silver 43 Bronze 46 Total 142

Mediterranean Games appearances (overview)
- 1951; 1955; 1959; 1963; 1967; 1971; 1975; 1979; 1983; 1987; 1991; 1993; 1997; 2001; 2005; 2009; 2013; 2018; 2022; 2026

Italy competed at the 1983 Mediterranean Games in Casablanca, Morocco.

== Medals ==
=== Athletics ===
Sport	Gold	Silver	Bronze	Total
Athletics	10	11	13	34
Totals (1 entries)	10	11	13	34

==== Men ====
Event	1st place, gold medalist(s)	2nd place, silver medalist(s)	3rd place, bronze medalist(s)
100 metres	Pierfrancesco Pavoni		Stefano Tilli
200 metres	Pietro Mennea		Carlo Simionato
5000 metres	Alberto Cova		
Hammer throw	Giampaolo Urlando	Orlando Bianchini	
Javelin throw	Agostino Ghesini		
20 km walk	Maurizio Damilano		Sergio Spagnulo
4×100 metres relay	Pierfrancesco Pavoni; Carlo Simionato; Stefano Tilli; Pietro Mennea		
10000 metres		Venanzio Ortis	
Triple jump		Dario Badinelli	
Shot put		Alessandro Andrei	
Decathlon		Hubert Indra	
4×400 metres relay		Roberto Ribaud; Donato Sabia; Mauro Zuliani; Daniele D'Amico	
110 metres hurdlers			Daniele Fontecchio
Pole vault			Mauro Barella; Viktor Drechsel
Long jump			Marco Piochi
Discus throw			Marco Martino
	7	6	8

==== Women ====
Event	1st place, gold medalist(s)	2nd place, silver medalist(s)	3rd place, bronze medalist(s)
1500 metres	Agnese Possamai		
3000 metres	Agnese Possamai		
4×400 metres relay	Cosetta Campana; Giuseppina Cirulli; Letizia Magenti; Erica Rossi		
100 metres		Marisa Masullo	
400 metres		Erica Rossi	Cosetta Campana
400 metres hurdlers		Giuseppina Cirulli	
Javelin throw		Fausta Quintavalla	
4×100 metres relay		Mary Busato; Daniela Ferrian; Marisa Masullo; Gisella Trombin	
200 metres			Marisa Masullo
Long jump			Antonella Capriotti
Discus throw			Renata Scaglia
Heptathlon			Esmeralda Pecchio
	3	5	5

== See also ==
- Boxing at the 1983 Mediterranean Games
- Volleyball at the 1983 Mediterranean Games
