= 1985 Italian Athletics Championships =

Edition of the Italian Athletics Championships

- Dates: 9–11 July
- Host city: Rome
- Venue: Olympic Stadium
- Level: Senior
- Events: 36 (20 men, 16 women)

The 1985 Italian Athletics Championships was the 75th edition of the Italian Athletics Championships and were held in Rome from 9 to 11 July 1985.

== Champions ==
The table also includes the national champions of non-track and field events whose competitions were not held in Rome.

Non-track and field events

Full results.

=== Men ===
| Event | Athlete | Performance |
|---|---|---|
| 100 metres | Carlo Simionato | 10.51 |
| 200 metres | Carlo Simionato | 20.68 |
| 400 metres | Pierfrancesco Pavoni | 46.34 |
| 800 metres | Alberto Barsotti | 1:49.71 |
| 1500 metres | Stefano Mei | 3:38.71 |
| 5000 metres | Alberto Cova | 13:30.26 |
| 10,000 metres | Salvatore Nicosia | 28:52.79 |
| 110 metres hurdles | Daniele Fontecchio | 13.81 |
| 400 metres hurdles | Luca Cosi | 50.70 |
| 3000 metres steeplechase | Francesco Panetta | 8:21.60 |
| High jump | Luca Toso | 2.21 |
| Pole vault | Mauro Barella | 5.40 |
| Long jump | Claudio Cherubini | 7.63 |
| Triple jump | Dario Badinelli | 16.22 |
| Shot put | Alessandro Andrei | 21.04 |
| Discus throw | Domenico Polato | 57.30 |
| Hammer throw | Orlando Bianchini | 75.22 |
| Javelin throw | Fabio Michielon | 76.66* |
| Decathlon | Marco Rossi | 7506 |
| Half Marathon | Loris Pimazzoni | 1:15:31** |
| Marathon | Osvaldo Faustini | 02:14:10 |
| 10,000 metres track walk | Maurizio Damilano | 39:41.95 |
| 20 km road walk | Maurizio Damilano | 01:22:53 |
| 50 km road walk | Maurizio Damilano | 03:54:00 |
| Cross country (long course) | Alberto Cova | |
| Mountain running | Fausto Bonzi | |

=== Women ===
| Event | Athlete | Performance |
|---|---|---|
| 100 metres | Marisa Masullo | 11.66 |
| 200 metres | Marisa Masullo | 23.26 |
| 400 metres | Erica Rossi | 52.97 |
| 800 metres | Erica Rossi | 2:08.38 |
| 1500 metres | Roberta Brunet | 4:21.39 |
| 3000 metres | Agnese Possamai | 9:14.27 |
| 10,000 metres | Maria Curatolo | 33:22.93 |
| 100 metres hurdles | Patrizia Lombardo | 13.43 |
| 400 metres hurdles | Giuseppina Cirulli | 56.97 |
| High jump | Sara Simeoni | 1.89 |
| Long jump | Antonella Capriotti | 6.40 |
| Shot put | Concetta Milanese | 16.26 |
| Discus throw | Claudia Paris | 50.68 |
| Javelin throw | Ambra Giacchetti | 54.04* |
| Heptathlon | Katia Pasquinelli | 5625 |
| Half Marathon | Anna Villani | 1:14:05* |
| Marathon | Paola Moro | 02:38:02 |
| 5000 Metres Track Walk | Maria Grazia Cogoli | 23:50.04 |
| Cross country (long course) | Agnese Possamai | |
| Cross country (short course) | - | |
| Mountain running | Manuela Di Centa | |
