= 1984 Italian Athletics Championships =

- Dates: 10–11 July
- Host city: Rome
- Level: Senior
- Events: 48 (27 men, 21 women)

The 1984 Italian Athletics Championships was the 74th edition of the Italian Athletics Championships and were held in Rome (track & field events).

== Champions ==
=== Men ===
Event	Athlete	Performance
100 metres	Stefano Tilli	10.21
200 metres	Pietro Mennea	20.35
400 metres	Donato Sabia	45.97
800 metres	Donato Sabia	1:48.19
1500 metres	Claudio Patrignani	3:45.43
5000 metres	Stefano Mei	13:48.27
10,000 metres	Gianni De Madonna	28:55.67
110 metres hurdles	Daniele Fontecchio	13.75
400 metres hurdles	Stefano Bizzaglia	51.40
3000 metres steeplechase	Franco Boffi	8:35.51
High jump	Paolo Borghi	2.21
Pole vault	Mauro Barella	5.50
Long jump	Claudio Cherubini	7.64
Triple jump	Dario Badinelli	16.25
Shot put	Alessandro Andrei	21.50
Discus throw	Marco Bucci	64.04
Hammer throw	Lucio Serrani	74.72
Javelin throw	Agostino Ghesini	76.84*
Decathlon	Moreno Martini	7502
Half Marathon	Vito Basiliana	1:41:10*
Marathon	Gianni Poli	02:11:05
10,000 metres track walk	Maurizio Damilano	40:51.53
20 km road walk	Maurizio Damilano	01:20:09
50 km road walk	Raffaello Ducceschi	3:43:02*
Cross country (long course)	Alberto Cova	
Cross country (short course)	not held	
Mountain running	Fausto Bonzi	

=== Women ===
Event	Athlete	Performance
100 metres	Marisa Masullo	11.49
200 metres	Carla Mercurio	23.83
400 metres	Erica Rossi	53.65
800 metres	Nicoletta Tozzi	2:08.39
1500 metres	Gabriella Dorio	4:07.19
3000 metres	Agnese Possamai	9:05.91
5000 metres	-	-
10,000 metres	Rita Marchisio	33:29.68
100 metres hurdles	Laura Rosati	13.66
400 metres hurdles	Giuseppina Cirulli	58.23
3000 metres steeplechase	-	-
High jump	Sandra Dini	1.80
Pole vault	-	-
Long jump	Antonella Capriotti	6.17
Triple jump	-	-
Shot put	Maria Assunta Chiummariello	16.00
Discus throw	Renata Scaglia	51.14
Hammer throw	-	-
Javelin throw	Fausta Quintavalla	62.68*
Heptathlon	Esmeralda Pecchio	5606
Half Marathon	Rita Marchisio	1:12:08*
Marathon	Paola Moro	02:33:03
5000 Metres Track Walk	Giuliana Salce	23:45.58
10 Kilometres Road Walk	Giuliana Salce	49:30:00
Cross country (long course)	Agnese Possamai	
Cross country (short course)	-	
Mountain running	Gabriella Carletti	
