= 1983 Italian Athletics Championships =

- Dates: 19–20 July
- Host city: Rome
- Level: Senior
- Events: 45

The 1983 Italian Athletics Championships was the 73rd edition of the Italian Athletics Championships and were held in Rome (track & field events).

== Champions ==
=== Men ===
Event	Athlete	Performance
100 metres	Pierfrancesco Pavoni	10.26
200 metres	Pietro Mennea	20.31
400 metres	Roberto Ribaud	46.41
800 metres	Donato Sabia	1:47.16
1500 metres	Claudio Patrignani	3:38.28
5000 metres	Alberto Cova	13:43.06
10,000 metres	Loris Pimazzoni	29:20.25
110 metres hurdles	Daniele Fontecchio	13.90
400 metres hurdles	Luca Cosi	51.36
3000 metres steeplechase	Mariano Scartezzini	8:36.26
High jump	Gianni Davito	2.27
Pole vault	Corrado Alagona	5.20
Long jump	Marco Piochi	7.83
Triple jump	Dario Badinelli	16.11
Shot put	Alessandro Andrei	20.14
Discus throw	Marco Martino	61.20
Hammer throw	Gian Paolo Urlando	74.74
Javelin throw	Agostino Ghesini	82.98*
Decathlon	Hubert Indra	7614
Half Marathon	Vito Basiliana	1:35:36*
Marathon	Giuseppe Gerbi	02:15:11
10,000 metres track walk	Maurizio Damilano	41:31.24
20 km road walk	Maurizio Damilano	01:21:50
50 km road walk	Raffaello Ducceschi	03:58:28
Cross country (long course)	Alberto Cova	
Cross country (short course)	not held	
Mountain running	Fausto Bonzi	

=== Women ===
Event	Athlete	Performance
100 metres	Marisa Masullo	11.46
200 metres	Marisa Masullo	23.36
400 metres	Erica Rossi	52.62
800 metres	Gabriella Dorio	2:04.05
1500 metres	Gabriella Dorio	4:14.42
3000 metres	Agnese Possamai	9:05.74
5000 metres	-	-
10,000 metres	-	-
100 metres hurdles	Simona Parmiggiani	13.58
400 metres hurdles	Giuseppina Cirulli	57.18
3000 metres steeplechase	-	-
High jump	Sara Simeoni	1.86
Pole vault	-	-
Long jump	Alessandra Beccati	6.13
Triple jump	-	-
Shot put	Concetta Milanese	15.28
Discus throw	Maristella Bano	52.00
Hammer throw	-	-
Javelin throw	Fausta Quintavalla	60.68*
Heptathlon	Katia Pasquinelli	5352
Half Marathon	Rita Marchisio	1:15:01*
Marathon	Alba Milana	02:32:57
5000 Metres Track Walk	Giuliana Salce	23:56.53
20 Kilometres Road Walk	-	-
Cross country (long course)	Gabriella Dorio	
Cross country (short course)	-	
Mountain running	Alba Milana	
