= Italy at the 1979 Mediterranean Games =

- IOC code: ITA
- NOC: Italian National Olympic Committee

in Split
- Medals Ranked 3rd: Gold 49 Silver 53 Bronze 47 Total 149

Mediterranean Games appearances (overview)
- 1951; 1955; 1959; 1963; 1967; 1971; 1975; 1979; 1983; 1987; 1991; 1993; 1997; 2001; 2005; 2009; 2013; 2018; 2022; 2026

Italy competed at the 1979 Mediterranean Games in Split, Croatia, Yugoslavia.

== Medals ==
=== Athletics ===
Sport	Gold	Silver	Bronze	Total
Athletics	13	12	8	33
Totals (1 entries)	13	12	8	33

==== Men ====
Event	1st place, gold medalist(s)	2nd place, silver medalist(s)	3rd place, bronze medalist(s)
100 metres	Pietro Mennea	Gianfranco Lazzer	
200 metres	Luciano Caravani		
5000 metres	Luigi Zarcone		
3000 metres steeplechase	Mariano Scartezzini		
High jump	Massimo Di Giorgio	Oscar Raise	
Discus throw	Armando De Vincentiis		
Hammer throw	Giampaolo Urlando	Edoardo Podberscek	Silvano Simeon
4×100 metres relay	Gianfranco Lazzer; Luciano Caravani; Giovanni Grazioli; Pietro Mennea		
10000 metres		Luigi Zarcone	
Marathon		Marco Marchei	
110 metres hurdlers		Giuseppe Buttari	
400 metres hurdlers			Fulvio Zorn
20 km walk			Carlo Mattioli
4×400 metres relay			Alfonso Di Guida; Flavio Borghi; Stefano Malinverni; Roberto Tozzi
	8	6	4

==== Women ====
Event	1st place, gold medalist(s)	2nd place, silver medalist(s)	3rd place, bronze medalist(s)
200 metres	Marisa Masullo		
800 metres	Gabriella Dorio	Agnese Possamai	
1500 metres	Margherita Gargano	Gabriella Dorio	
High jump	Sara Simeoni	Donatella Bulfoni	
Discus throw	Renata Scaglia		
100 metres		Marisa Masullo	Laura Miano
Javelin throw		Fausta Quintavalla	
4×100 metres relay		Irma Galli; Patrizia Lombardo; Marisa Masullo; Laura Miano	
100 metres hurdles			Patrizia Lombardo
Shot put			Cinzia Petrucci
Pentathlon			Barbara Bachlechner
	5	6	4

== See also ==
- Boxing at the 1979 Mediterranean Games
- Football at the 1979 Mediterranean Games
- Volleyball at the 1979 Mediterranean Games
- Water polo at the 1979 Mediterranean Games
