= Filippos Filippou (runner) =

Cypriot long-distance runner (born 1956)

Personal information
- Nationality: Cypriot
- Born: 29 September 1956 (age 69) Famagusta, Cyprus

Sport
- Sport: Long-distance running
- Event: Marathon
Medal record
Representing Cyprus
Mediterranean Games
Silver medal – second place	1983 Casablanca	5000m

Filippos Filippou (Greek: Φίλιππος Φιλίππου; born 29 September 1956) is a Greek-Cypriot long-distance runner. He competed in the marathon at the 1984 Summer Olympics.
