= Edoardo Podberscek =

Italian hammer thrower (born 1949)

Personal information
- National team: Italy: 11 caps (1973–1980)
- Born: 2 May 1949 (age 77) Gorizia, Italy
- Height: 1.83 m (6 ft 0 in)
- Weight: 114 kg (251 lb)

Sport
- Sport: Athletics
- Event: Hammer throw
- Club: G.S. Fiamme Gialle

Achievements and titles
- Personal best: Hammer throw: 74.60 m (1979)
Medal record
Mediterranean Games
Silver medal – second place	1979 Split	Hammer throw

Edoardo Podberscek (2 May 1949) was an Italian hammer thrower, speciality in which was 7th at the 1978 European Athletics Championships.

== Achievements ==
Year	Competition	Venue	Rank	Event	Time	Notes
1976	Olympic Games	(Canada) Montreal	17th	Hammer throw	66.56 m	
1978	European Championships	(Czechoslovakia) Prague	7th	Hammer throw	73.92 m	
1979	Mediterranean Games	(Socialist Federal Republic of Yugoslavia) Split	2nd	Hammer throw	69.42 m	

== See also ==
- Italy at the 1978 European Athletics Championships
- Italy at the 1979 Mediterranean Games
