= Accambray =

Accambray is a surname of French origin. Notable people with the surname include:

- Isabelle Accambray (born 1956), French discus thrower
- Jacques Accambray (born 1950), French hammer thrower
- William Accambray (born 1988), French handball player
