= Ahmet Altun =

Turkish long-distance runner

Personal information
- Nationality: Turkish
- Born: 25 January 1958 (age 68) Ankara, Turkey

Sport
- Sport: Long-distance running
- Event: Marathon
Medal record
Representing Turkey
Mediterranean Games
Silver medal – second place	1983 Casablanca	Marathon
Bronze medal – third place	1987 Latakia	Marathon

Ahmet Altun (born 25 January 1958) is a Turkish former long-distance runner. He competed in the marathon at the 1984 Summer Olympics and the 1988 Summer Olympics.
