= Jean-Jacques Boussemart =

French sprinter

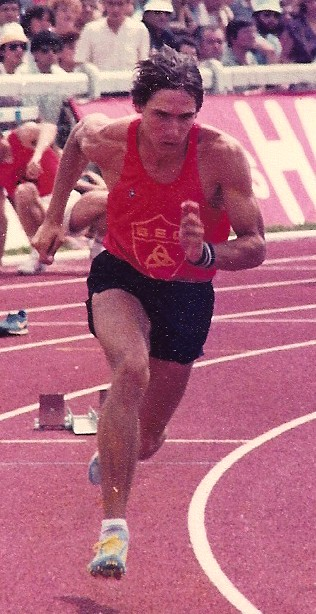

Personal information
- Born: 22 April 1963 (age 63) Lourdes, France

Sport
- Sport: Track and field
Medal record
Representing France
Mediterranean Games
Gold medal – first place	1983 Casablanca	4x400m relay
Silver medal – second place	1983 Casablanca	200m
Silver medal – second place	1983 Casablanca	4x100m relay

Jean-Jacques Boussemart (born 22 April 1963) is a French former sprinter, who competed in the 1984 Summer Olympics. He also won 2 French 200 metre titles in 1983 and 1984

== International competitions ==
Year	Competition	Venue	Position	Event	Time	Notes
1983	World Championships	(Finland) Helsinki	6th (sf)	200 m	20.76	wind +1.4
