= Philippe Deroche =

French long jumper

Personal information
- Nationality: French
- Born: 11 September 1954 (age 71) Nevers, France

Sport
- Sport: Athletics
- Event: Long jump
Medal record
Representing France
Mediterranean Games
Silver medal – second place	1979 Split	Long jump

Philippe Deroche (born 11 September 1954) is a French athlete. He competed in the men's long jump at the 1976 Summer Olympics and the 1980 Summer Olympics.
