= Robert Froissart =

French sprinter (born 1955)

Personal information
- Born: 26 February 1955 (age 71) Fronton, Haute-Garonne, France

Sport
- Sport: Track and field
Medal record
Representing France
Mediterranean Games
Gold medal – first place	1979 Split	4x400m relay

Robert Froissart (born 26 February 1955) is a French former sprinter who competed in the 1980 Summer Olympics.
