= Abdelmadjid Mada =

Algerian long-distance runner

Abdelmadjid Mada (Arabic: عبد المجيد مدى; born 6 April 1953) is an Algerian retired long-distance runner who specialized in the 10,000 metres.

He competed in both the 10,000 metres and the marathon at the 1980 Olympic Games, but was knocked out in the heat of the 10,000 metres and failed to finish the marathon. He also won a gold medal at the 1979 Mediterranean Games, and a silver medal at the 1981 Maghreb Championships.

His personal best times were 28.33.08 minutes in the 10,000 metres, achieved in 1979; and 2.15.01 hours in the marathon, achieved in 1980.

== Achievements ==
Year	Competition	Venue	Position	Event	Notes
Representing Algeria
1980	Olympic Games	Moscow, Soviet Union	—	Marathon	DNF
