= Athletics at the 1975 Summer Universiade – Women's 100 metres =

The women's 100 metres event at the 1975 Summer Universiade was held at the Stadio Olimpico in Rome on 18 and 19 September.

== Medalists ==
Gold	Silver	Bronze
Lyudmila Zharkova; Soviet Union	Mona-Lisa Pursiainen; Finland	Patty Loverock; Canada

== Results ==
=== Heats ===
Wind:
Heat 1: 0.0 m/s, Heat 2: 0.0 m/s

Rank	Heat	Athlete	Nationality	Time	Notes
1	2	Lyudmila Zharkova	Soviet Union	11.40	Q
2	1	Mona-Lisa Pursiainen	Finland	11.45	Q
3	1	Patty Loverock	Canada	11.60	Q
4	2	Lilyana Panayotova	Bulgaria	11.79	Q
5	1	Cecilia Molinari	Italy	11.89	Q
5	2	Ewa Długołęcka	Poland	11.89	Q
7	1	Maria Długosielska	Poland	11.92	q
8	2	Rose-Aimée Bacoul	France	12.04	q
9	1	Kemi Sangodeyi	Nigeria	12.08	
10	1	Marina Sidorova-Nikiforova	Soviet Union	12.10	
11	1	Cécile Cachera	France	12.28	
12	2	Zahra Hosseini	Iran	12.69	

=== Final ===
Wind: 0.0 m/s

Rank	Athlete	Nationality	Time	Notes
1st place, gold medalist(s)	Lyudmila Zharkova	Soviet Union	11.31	GR, NR
2nd place, silver medalist(s)	Mona-Lisa Pursiainen	Finland	11.47	
3rd place, bronze medalist(s)	Patty Loverock	Canada	11.57	
4	Lilyana Panayotova	Bulgaria	11.79	
5	Ewa Długołęcka	Poland	11.89	
6	Cecilia Molinari	Italy	12.00	
7	Rose-Aimée Bacoul	France	12.01	
8	Maria Długosielska	Poland	12.03	
