= Catherine Beauvais (athlete) =

French discus thrower

Personal information
- Born: 11 January 1965 (age 61) Argenteuil, France
- Height: 172 cm (5 ft 8 in)
- Weight: 80 kg (176 lb)

Sport
- Country: France
- Sport: Athletics
- Event: Discus throw

Catherine Beauvais (born 11 January 1965 in Argenteuil) is a former French athlete, who specialised in the discus throw.

== Biography ==
Beauvais won two championship titles of France in the discus: in 1983 and 1984. She improved twice the French record bringing it to 56.48m then 57.50m in 1983.

She won the silver medal in the 1983 Mediterranean Games and the 1989 Games of La Francophonie.

=== Achievements ===
- French Championships in Athletics :
  - 2-time winner of the discus in 1983 and 1984

=== Records ===
personal records
Event	Performance	Location	Date
Discus throw	57.50m		1983
