= Viktor Drechsel =

Italian pole vaulter

Personal information
- Nationality: Italian
- Born: August 7, 1960 (age 65) Bolzano, Italy

Sport
- Country: Italy
- Sport: Athletics
- Event: Pole vault
- Retired: 1978

Achievements and titles
- Personal best: Pole vault: 5.52 m (1985)
Medal record
Mediterranean Games
Bronze medal – third place	1983 Casablanca	Pole vault

Viktor Drechsel (born 7 August 1960) is a retired Italian pole vaulter.

== Biography ==
He won a bronze medal at the 1983 Mediterranean Games with the result 5.10 metres. He finished behind French Patrick Abada and Serge Leveur, but shared the bronze with countryfellow Mauro Barella.

His personal best jump was 5.52 metres, achieved in June 1985 in Formia., He has 11 caps in national team from 1981 to 1985.

== See also ==
- Italian all-time lists - Pole vault
