= Loval =

Loval is a surname. Notable people with the surname include:

- Loïc Loval (born 1981), French and Guadeloupean footballer
- Marie-France Loval (born 1964), French track and field athlete
