= Isabelle Accambray =

French discus thrower (born 1956)

Personal information
- Born: 9 July 1956 (age 69) Clichy, France

Sport
- Event: Discus throw
- Partner: Jacques Accambray
Medal record
Women's athletics
Representing France
Mediterranean Games
| Gold medal – first place | 1983 Casablanca | Discus throw |

Isabelle Accambray (née Reynaud; born 9 July 1956) is a former French discus thrower. Born in Clichy, she was a member of Athlétic Club de Cannes during her career. She represented France 25 times in international competition, with her best result being a gold medal at the 1983 Mediterranean Games. She participated in the European Cup in 1979, 1981 and 1983, as well as the 1982 European Athletics Championships. She was a three-time French champion in the discus.

== Personal life ==
Isabelle is married to Jacques Accambray, a former hammer thrower and President of the French Federation of American Football from 1985 to 1996. Their daughter, Jennifer, is also an athlete, specialising in the Javelin. Their son William is a handball player playing with Paris Saint-Germain Handball. The last child, Michael, has begun a career as a volleyball player.

== National titles ==
- French Championships in Athletics
  - Discus throw: 1980, 1981, 1982

== National records ==
French record

- 53.42 meters September 23, 1981 at Issy-les-Moulineaux
- 53.52 meters November 7, 1981 at Pirae
- 53.98 meters May 2, 1982 at Nice
- 54.52 meters May 15, 1982 at Fort-de-France
- 55.04 meters June 5, 1982 at Reims
- 56.28 meters August 22, 1982 at Steinkjer
