= Luigi Zarcone =

Italian runner (1950–2001)

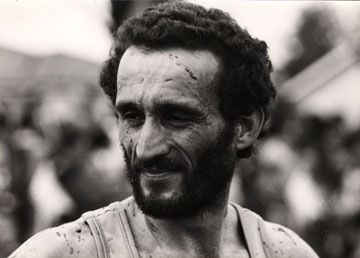

Personal information
- Nationality: Italian
- Born: 18 June 1950 Villabate, Italy
- Died: 9 June 2001 (aged 50) Palermo, Italy

Sport
- Country: Italy
- Sport: Athletics
- Event(s): Middle distance running Long distance running
- Club: G.S. Fiamme Gialle

Achievements and titles
- Personal bests: 800 m: 1:49.6 (1976); 1500 m: 3:37.7 (1974); 3000 m: 7:47.54 (1977); 5000 m: 13:23.7 (1977); 10000 m: 28:02.3 (1977)
Medal record
Mediterranean Games
Gold medal – first place	1979 Split	5000 metres
Silver medal – second place	1979 Split	10000 metres

Luigi Zarcone (18 June 1950, in Villabate – 9 June 2001, in Palermo) was an Italian middle and long distance runner.

== Biography ==
Luigi Zarcone won two medals, at senior level, at the International athletics competitions. He has 32 caps in national team from 1973 to 1983. He died prematurely at only 50 years old, in Palermo in 2001. In his native hometown, Villabate in Sicily, is organized every year since 2003, a race named after him, the Memorial Luigi Zarcone.

== Achievements ==
Year	Competition	Venue	Position	Event	Time	Notes
1979	Mediterranean Games	(Socialist Federal Republic of Yugoslavia) Split	1st	5000 metres	13:45.11	
1979	Mediterranean Games	(Socialist Federal Republic of Yugoslavia) Split	2nd	10000 metres	28.39.06	

== National titles ==
Luigi Zarcone has won 4 times the individual national championship.

- 1 win in the 1500 metres (1974)
- 2 wins in the 10000 metres (1977, 1979)
- 1 win in the cross country running (1979)

== See also ==
- Italy at the 1979 Mediterranean Games
