= Sotirios Moutsanas =

Greek middle-distance runner

Personal information
- Born: 2 January 1958 (age 68) Athens, Greece

Sport
- Sport: Track and field
Medal record
Representing Greece
Summer Universiade
Silver medal – second place	1981 Bucharest	800m
Mediterranean Games
Bronze medal – third place	1979 Split	800m

Sotirios Moutsanas (born 2 January 1958) is a retired Greek middle distance runner who specialized in the 800 metres.

Moutsanas competed for the Washington State Cougars track and field team in the NCAA.

He won the bronze medal at the 1979 Mediterranean Games and the silver medal at the 1981 Summer Universiade. He also competed at the 1983 World Championships and the 1984 Olympic Games without reaching the final.

His personal best time was 1:46.36 minutes, achieved during the 1984 Olympics in Los Angeles. This ranks him second on the Greek all-time list, only behind Panagiotis Stroubakos.
