= Fathi Aboud =

Libyan triple jumper (born 1964)

Fathi Khalifa Aboud
Personal information
- Nationality: Libyan
- Born: 25 September 1964 (age 61)

Sport
- Sport: Weightlifting

Fathi Khalifa Aboud (born 25 September 1964) is a retired Libyan triple jumper.

He finished fourth at the 1983 Mediterranean Games and competed at the 1988 Summer Olympics without reaching the final. His personal best jump was 16.13 metres, achieved in 1985.

He coached Hadel Aboud.
