= Donatella Bulfoni =

Italian high jumper (born 1959)

Personal information
- Nationality: Italian
- Born: November 6, 1959 (age 66) Udine, Italy

Sport
- Country: Italy
- Sport: Athletics
- Event: High jump
- Club: Snia Milano

Achievements and titles
- Personal best: High jump: 1.91 m (1981)
Medal record
Mediterranean Games
Silver medal – second place	1979 Split	High jump

Donatella Bulfoni (born 6 November 1959) is a retired Italian high jumper.

== Biography ==
Her personal best jump was 1.91 metres, achieved in July 1981 in Bucharest.

== Achievements ==
Year	Tournament	Venue	Result	Extra
1979	European Indoor Championships	Vienna, Austria	10th	
1979	Mediterranean Games	Split, Yugoslavia	2nd	
1981	European Indoor Championships	Grenoble, France	8th	

== See also ==
- Italian all-time top lists - High jump
