= Sandra Dini =

Italian high jumper

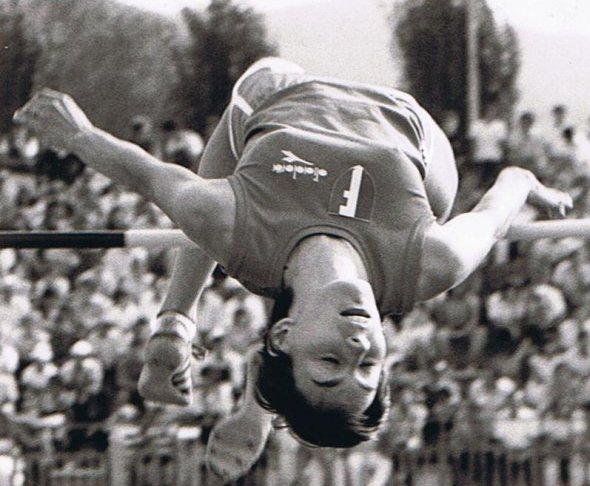

Personal information
- Nationality: Italian
- Born: January 1, 1958 (age 68) Florence, Italy
- Height: 1.70 m (5 ft 7 in)
- Weight: 55 kg (121 lb)

Sport
- Country: Italy
- Sport: Athletics
- Event: High jump

Achievements and titles
- Personal best: High jump: 1.92 m (1981)
Medal record
Mediterranean Games
Bronze medal – third place	1983 Casablanca	High jump

Sandra Dini (born 1 January 1958 in Florence) is a retired Italian high jumper.

== Biography ==
She finished eleventh at the 1981 European Indoor Championships. She became Italian champion in 1981 and 1984. Her personal best jump was 1.92 m (6 ft 4 in), achieved in June 1981 in Udine.

== National titles ==
In the "Sara Simeoni era", Sandra Dini has won 4 times the individual national championship.

- 2 wins in high jump (1981, 1984)
- 2 wins in high jump indoor (1982, 1985)

== See also ==
- Italian all-time top lists - High jump
