= Luca Cosi =

Italian hurdler

Personal information
- National team: Italy: 21 caps (1981-1988)
- Born: 16 April 1963 (age 63) Arezzo, Italy

Sport
- Sport: Athletics
- Event: 400 m hs
- Club: Pro Patria Freedent

Achievements and titles
- Personal best: 400 m hs: 50.28 (1986)

Luca Cosi (born 16 April 1963) is a former Italian hurdler.

== Achievements ==
Year	Competition	Venue	Rank	Event	Time	Notes
1983	Mediterranean Games	(Morocco) Casablanca	4th	400 m hs	53.04	
1986	European Championships	(West Germany) Stuttgart	Semifinal	400 m hs	50.28	PB

== National titles ==
Cosi won four national championships.

- Italian Athletics Championships
  - 400 m hs: 1983, 1985, 1986, 1988
