= Marc Gasparoni =

French sprinter (born 1959)

Personal information
- Nationality: French
- Born: 15 July 1959 (age 66) Paris, France

Sport
- Sport: Sprinting
- Event: 100 metres

Marc Gasparoni (born 15 July 1959) is a French sprinter. He competed in the men's 100 metres at the 1984 Summer Olympics.
