= Gianfranco Lazzer =

Italian sprinter

Personal information
- Nationality: Italian
- Born: July 4, 1955 (age 71) San Stino di Livenza, Italy
- Height: 1.72 m (5 ft 7 1/2 in)
- Weight: 71 kg (157 lb)

Sport
- Country: Italy
- Sport: Athletics
- Event: Sprint
- Club: G.S. Fiamme Oro

Achievements and titles
- Personal best: 100 m: 10.27 (1979)
Medal record
Summer Universiade
Gold medal – first place	1979 Mexico City	4×100 metres relay
Mediterranean Games
Gold medal – first place	1979 Split	4×100 metres relay
Silver medal – second place	1979 Split	100 metres

Gianfranco Lazzer (born 4 July 1955 in Vicenza, Veneto) is a former Italian sprinter.

== Biography ==
He won three medals at the International athletics competitions, of these two with the national relay team. He has 16 caps in national team from 1979 to 1983.

== Achievements ==
Year	Competition	Venue	Position	Event	Performance	Notes
1979	Mediterranean Games	(Socialist Federal Republic of Yugoslavia) Split, Yugoslavia	1st	4 × 100 m relay	39.27	
1979	Mediterranean Games	(Socialist Federal Republic of Yugoslavia) Split, Yugoslavia	2nd	100 metres	10.47	
1979	Universiade	Mexico City, Mexico	1st	4 × 100 m relay	38.42	

== National titles ==
In the "Pietro Mennea era", Gianfranco Lazzer has won one time the individual national championship.

- 1 win in the 60 metres indoor (1980)

== See also ==
- Italy national relay team
