= Claudio Cherubini =

Italian former long jumper

Personal information
- National team: Italy: 9 (1985-1988)
- Born: 29 April 1960 (age 66) Rome, Italy

Sport
- Sport: Athletics
- Event: Long jump
- Club: Cus Roma

Achievements and titles
- Personal best: Long jump: 7.94 m (1986)

Claudio Cherubini (born 29 April 1960) is a former Italian long jumper.

== Career ==
Two-time national champion at senior level in long jump in 1984 and 1985, and indoor in 1986.

== Achievements ==
| Year | Competition | Venue | Rank | Event | Measure | Notes |
|---|---|---|---|---|---|---|
| 1986 | European Indoor Championships | (Spain) Madrid | 14th | Long jump | 7.52 m | |
| 1987 | Universiade | (Socialist Federal Republic of Yugoslavia) Zagreb | 12th | Long jump | 7.56 m | |
