= Mauro Barella =

Italian pole vaulter (born 1956)

Personal information
- Nationality: Italian
- Born: December 12, 1956 (age 69) Palermo, Italy
- Height: 1.78 m (5 ft 10 in)
- Weight: 70 kg (150 lb)

Sport
- Country: Italy
- Sport: Athletics
- Event: Pole vault
- Club: G.S. Fiamme Oro

Achievements and titles
- Personal best: Pole vault: 5.50 m (1984)

Mauro Barella (born 12 December 1956) is a retired Italian pole vaulter.

He was born in Palermo, and represented the club Fiamme Oro. He finished seventh at the 1982 European Indoor Championships in |Milan, and in joint twelfth at the 1983 European Indoor Championships. He won a bronze medal at the 1983 Mediterranean Games with the result 5.10 metres. He finished behind French Patrick Abada and Serge Leveur, but shared the bronze with countryfellow Viktor Drechsel.

Barella also competed at the 1984 Olympic Games. In the qualifying round he cleared 5.10, 5.20, 5.30 and 5.35—the latter height in the last attempt—to qualify for the final. In the final he cleared 5.10 in the last attempt, passed 5.20 and cleared 5.30 metres in the last attempt before failing at 5.40. He finished eighth overall.

Barella became Italian champion in 1982, 1984 and 1985. In 1984 he set a championship record of 5.50 metres, which was broken in 1985 when Viktor Drechsel achieved 5.52. Barella also became Italian indoor champion in 1982 and 1984. 5.50 metres from Rome in July 1984 remained his career best.
