= Necdet Ayaz =

Turkish long-distance runner

Personal information
- Nationality: Turkish
- Born: 4 July 1958 (age 68) Elazığ, Turkey

Sport
- Sport: Long-distance running
- Event: 5000 metres

Necdet Ayaz (born 4 July 1958) is a Turkish long-distance runner. He competed in the men's 5000 metres at the 1984 Summer Olympics.
