= Renata Scaglia =

Italian discus thrower (born 1954)

Personal information
- Nationality: Italian
- Born: April 24, 1954 (age 72) Turin, Italy

Sport
- Country: Italy
- Sport: Athletics
- Event: Discus throw

Achievements and titles
- Personal best: Discus throw: 55.92 m (1980)
Medal record
Mediterranean Games
Gold medal – first place	1979 Split	Discus throw
Silver medal – second place	1975 Algiers	Discus throw
Bronze medal – third place	1983 Casablanca	Discus throw

Renata Scaglia (born 24 April 1954 in Turin) is a former Italian discus thrower.

== Biography ==
She won three medals, at senior level, at the International athletics competitions. She has 31 caps in national team from 1973 to 1984. After sport career, she has been teaching Scienze motorie e sportive at the University of Turin.

== Achievements ==
Year	Competition	Venue	Position	Event	Time	Notes
1975	Mediterranean Games	(Algeria) Algiers	2nd	Discus throw	50.60 m	
1979	Mediterranean Games	(Socialist Federal Republic of Yugoslavia) Split	1st	Discus throw	52.92 m	
1983	Mediterranean Games	(Morocco) Casablanca	3rd	Discus throw	53.34 m	

== National titles ==
Renata Scaglia has won 8 times the individual national championship.

- 7 wins in the discus throw (1973, 1974, 1975, 1976, 1978, 1981, 1984)
- 1 win in the discus throw at the Italian Winter Throwing Championships (1984)

== See also ==
- Italy at the 1979 Mediterranean Games
