= Orlando Bianchini =

Italian hammer thrower (born 1955)

Personal information
- Nationality: Italian
- Born: June 4, 1955 (age 71) Guidonia, Italy
- Height: 1.93 m (6 ft 4 in)
- Weight: 130 kg (287 lb)

Sport
- Country: Italy
- Sport: Athletics
- Event: Hammer throw
- Club: G.S. Fiamme Gialle

Achievements and titles
- Personal best: Hammer throw: 77.94 m (1994)
Medal record
Mediterranean Games
Silver medal – second place	1983 Casablanca	Hammer throw

Orlando Bianchini (born 4 June 1955 in Guidonia, Roma) is a retired male hammer thrower from Italy, that won a medal at the Mediterranean Games (1983).

== Biography ==
Orlando Bianchini participated at one edition of the Summer Olympics (1984), he has 34 caps in national team from 1975 to 1987.

== Achievements ==
Year	Competition	Venue	Position	Notes
1982	European Championships	Athens, Greece	16th	
1983	Mediterranean Games	Casablanca, Morocco	2nd	
1984	Olympic Games	Los Angeles, United States	4th	

== National titles ==
Orlando Bianchini has won 2 times the individual national championship.

- 1 win in Hammer throw (1985)
- 1 win in hammer throw at the Italian Winter Throwing Championships (1984)

== See also ==
- Italian all-time lists - Hammer throw
