= Serge Leveur =

French pole vaulter

Serge Leveur (born 17 June 1957) is a retired French pole vaulter.

He won the silver medal at the 1983 Mediterranean Games with a jump of 5.30 metres. The gold went to Patrick Abada, who cleared 5.55 m.

Leveur's personal best jump was 5.60 m, which he achieved twice: in June 1985 in Suresnes, and in July 1986 in Paris.
