= Giuseppina Cirulli =

Italian hurdler (born 1959)

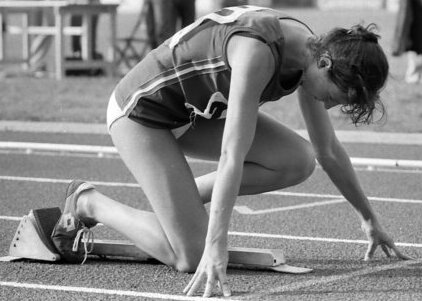
- Cirulli in 1978

Personal information
- Nationality: Italian
- Born: 19 March 1959 (age 67) Rome, Italy
- Height: 1.68 m (5 ft 6 in)
- Weight: 72 kg (159 lb)

Sport
- Country: Italy
- Sport: Athletics
- Event: 400 metres hurdles
- Club: CUS Roma

Achievements and titles
- Personal bests: 400 m: 53.18 (1978); 400 m hs: 56.44 (1979)
Medal record
Mediterranean Games
Silver medal – second place	Casablanca 1983	400 m hurdles
Gold medal – first place	Casablanca 1983	4x400 m relay
Gold medal – first place	Latakia 1987	4x400 m relay

Giuseppina "Pinuccia" Cirulli (born 19 March 1959, in Rome) is an Italian hurdler. She won three medals, to individual level, at the International athletics competitions.

== Biography ==
She was semifinalist at 1982 European Athletics Championships in Athens, in the 400 m hurdles. At the 1984 Olympic Games in Los Angeles, she reached the semi-finals of the 400 m hurdles. She also ran in the heats of the 4 × 400 m relay, before being replaced by Marisa Masullo for the final. Her personal best, on 400 metres hurdles, is 56"44 set in 1984 in Catania. She has 47 caps in national team from 1975 to 1988.

== Olympic results ==
Year	Competition	Venue	Position	Event	Performance	Notes
1984	Olympic Games	(United States) Los Angeles	heats#	4x400 metres relay	3:32.55	
1984	Olympic Games	(United States) Los Angeles	SF	400 metres hurdles	56.45	

- # - Italy went on to run 3:30.82 in the final.

== National titles ==
Giuseppina Cirulli has won 13 times the individual national championship.

- 11 wins in the 400 metres hurdles (1977, 1978, 1979, 1980, 1981, 1982, 1983, 1984, 1985, 1986, 1987)
- 1 win in the 400 metres indoor (1976)
- 1 win in the 800 metres indoor (1985)

== See also ==
- Italy national relay team
- Italian all-time lists - 400 metres hurdles
