= Hubert Indra =

Italian decathlete (born 1957)

Personal information
- Nationality: Italian
- Born: 24 April 1957 (age 69) Cermes

Sport
- Country: Italy
- Sport: Athletics
- Event: Combined events

Achievements and titles
- Personal best: Decathlon: 7617 pts (1982)
Medal record
Athletics
Mediterranean Games
Silver medal – second place	1983 Casablanca	Decathlon
Master athletics
World Masters Championships
Gold medal – first place	2018 Malaga	Decathlon M60
Silver medal – second place	2018 Malaga	100 m hs M60
Bronze medal – third place	2018 Malaga	High jump M60
Bronze medal – third place	2018 Malaga	Pole vault M60

Hubert Indra (born 24 May 1957) is an Italian male decathlete, who has continued his career into masters athletics.

== Biography ==
During his career at senior level in track & field, he got 13 caps in the Italy national athletics team (from 1977 to 1991), and he won a silver medal at the 1983 Mediterranean Games. He has won three times at the Italian Athletics Championships. and ranked in the top 60, at 29th place, on the IAAF world leading list at the end of the 1982 season, with his personal best that was also national record.

On 30 June 2007 in Milan he has sets the world record master M50 of decathlon with 7824 pts.

== World records ==
Masters athletics

- Decathlon M50: 7824 pts, (Italy) Milan, 30 June 2007, until 7 June 2014 when was broken by Jean-Luc Duez with 7897 pts

100m (wind)	Long jump (wind)	Shot put	High jump	400m	100m H (wind)	Discus	Pole vault	Javelin	1500m
13.04 (-2.6)	5.25 (0.3)	12.76	1.75	58.83	15.74 (-0.4)	40.44	4.00	47.80	5:12.73

Note: Hurdles are 100 m and not 110 m as in Decathlon senior, Shot put (6.000 kg), Discus throw (1.500 kg), Javelin throw (700 g).

== Personal best ==
- Decathlon: 7617 pts, (Italy) Donnas, 19 August 1982

100m	Long jump	Shot put	High jump	400m	110m H	Discus	Pole vault	Javelin	1500m
11.4	7.14	13.67	1.92	51.4	14.6	43.04	4.50	62.42	4:31.7

Note: Shot put (7.260 kg), 110 metres hurdles (1.067 m), Discus throw (2.000 kg), Javelin throw (800 g).

== Achievements ==
Masters

Year	Competition	Venue	Position	Event	Performance	Notes
1997	World Masters Championships	(South Africa) Durban	1st	Decathlon M40	7758 pts	
1999	World Masters Championships	(United Kingdom) Gateshead	1st	Decathlon M40	7275 pts	
2006	World Masters Indoor Championships	(Austria) Linz	1st	Pentathlon M45	4010 pts	
2006	World Masters Indoor Championships	(Austria) Linz	3rd	Pole vault M45	4.20 m	
2014	World Masters Indoor Championships	(Hungary) Budapest	2nd	Pole vault M55	3.60 m	

== National titles ==
- Italian Athletics Championships
  - Decathlon: 1977, 1980, 1983
