= Erica Rossi =

Italian sprinter

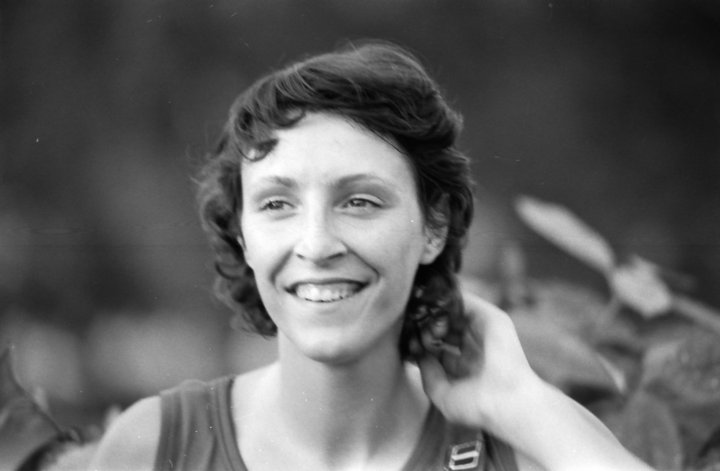
- Erica Rossi in the 1970s

Personal information
- Nationality: Italian
- Born: 20 November 1955 (age 70) Bolzano, Italy
- Height: 1.78 m (5 ft 10 in)
- Weight: 61 kg (134 lb)

Sport
- Country: Italy
- Sport: Athletics
- Event: 400 metres
- Club: Iveco Brescia

Achievements and titles
- Personal bests: 400 m: 52.01 (1982); 800 m: 2:04.53 (1985)
Medal record
European Indoor Championships
Silver medal – second place	1984 Gothenburg	400 m
Mediterranean Games
Gold medal – first place	1983 Casablanca	4x400 m relay
Gold medal – first place	1987 Latakia	4x400 m relay
Silver medal – second place	1983 Casablanca	400 m
Silver medal – second place	1987 Latakia	400 m

Erica Rossi (Bolzano, 20 November 1955) is an Italian former sprinter (400 m).

== Biography ==
In her career she won 20 times the national championships. She has 67 caps in national team (third of all-time after Marisa Masullo, 79 and Agnese Maffeis, 73).

== National records ==
- 400 metres: 52.01 ( (Greece) Athens, 7 September 1982) - holder until 1996

== Achievements ==
Year	Competition	Venue	Position	Event	Performance	Notes
1983	Mediterranean Games	(Morocco) Casablanca	2nd	400 metres	53.83	
1983	Mediterranean Games	(Morocco) Casablanca	1st	4x400 metres relay	3:33.63	
1984	European Indoor Championships	(Sweden) Gothenburg	2nd	400 metres	52.37	
1984	Olympic Games	(United States) Los Angeles	6th	4x400 metres relay	3:30.82	
1987	Mediterranean Games	(Syria) Latakia	2nd	400 metres	53.57	
1987	Mediterranean Games	(Syria) Latakia	1st	4x400 metres relay	3:32.14	

== National titles ==
- 11 wins on 400 metres at the Italian Athletics Championships (1976, 1977, 1978, 1979, 1980, 1981, 1982, 1983, 1984, 1985, 1987)
- 1 win on 800 metres at the Italian Athletics Championships (1985)
- 6 wins on 400 metres at the Italian Athletics Indoor Championships (1980, 1981, 1984, 1985, 1986, 1988)
- 2 wins on 200 metres at the Italian Athletics Indoor Championships (1982, 1983)

== See also ==
- Italian all-time top lists - 400 metres
- Italy national relay team
