= Marisa Masullo =

Italian sprinter (born 1959)

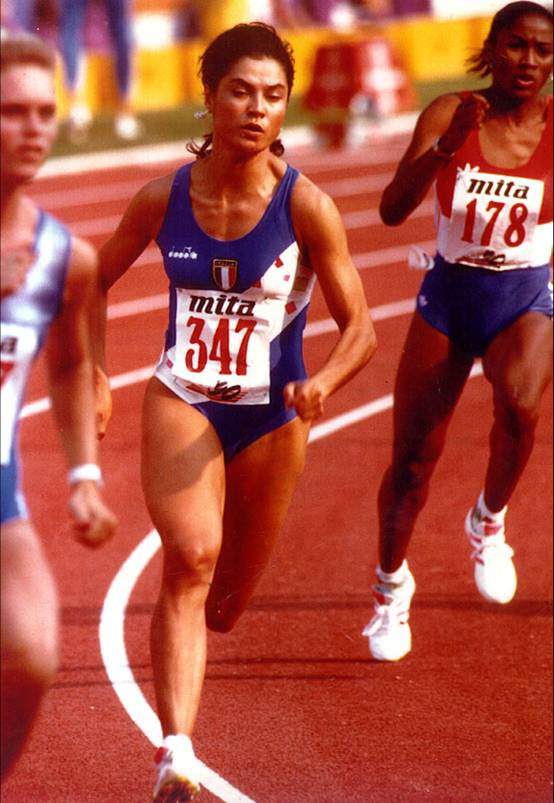
- Masullo in 1990

Personal information
- Nationality: Italian
- Born: 8 May 1959 (age 67) Milan, Italy
- Height: 1.70 m (5 ft 7 in)
- Weight: 60 kg (132 lb)

Sport
- Country: Italy
- Sport: Athletics
- Event: Sprint
- Club: Snia Milano

Achievements and titles
- Personal bests: 100 m: 11.29 (1980); 200 m: 22.88 (1984); 400 m: 52.41 (1985); 60 m i: 7.19 (1983); 200 m i: 23.44 (1988)
Medal record
| Event | 1st | 2nd | 3rd |
|---|---|---|---|
| European Indoor Championships | 0 | 0 | 1 |
| Summer Universiade | 0 | 1 | 1 |
| Mediterranean Games | 3 | 6 | 1 |
| Total | 3 | 7 | 3 |
European Indoor Championships
| Bronze medal – third place | 1983 Budapest | 60 m |
Summer Universiade
| Silver medal – second place | 1981 Bucharest | 200 m |
| Bronze medal – third place | 1981 Bucharest | 4x100 m relay |
Mediterranean Games
| Gold medal – first place | 1979 Split | 200 m |
| Gold medal – first place | 1987 Latakia | 200 m |
| Gold medal – first place | 1991 Athens | 200 m |
| Silver medal – second place | 1979 Split | 100 m |
| Silver medal – second place | 1979 Split | 4×100 m relay |
| Silver medal – second place | 1983 Casablanca | 100 m |
| Silver medal – second place | 1983 Casablanca | 4×100 m relay |
| Silver medal – second place | 1987 Latakia | 4×100 m relay |
| Silver medal – second place | 1991 Athens | 4×100 m relay |
| Bronze medal – third place | 1983 Casablanca | 200 m |

Marisa Masullo (born 8 May 1959) is a former Italian athlete, who mainly competed in the 100 metres and 200 metres.

== Biography ==
Masullo was born in Milan, Italy and competed for Italy at three Olympic Games, in Moscow 1980, Los Angeles 1984 and Seoul 1988. She was a three-time gold medal winner in the 200 m at the Mediterranean Games She also won a silver medal in the 200 m at the 1981 Universiade and a bronze medal in the 60 metres at the 1983 European Indoor Championships.

Marisa Masullo held the national records for 60 metres, 100 and 200 metres.

== National titles ==
Marisa Masullo won 30 individual national championship from 1978 to 1993 (all-time record-woman).

| Event | Wins | 78 | 79 | 80 | 81 | 82 | 83 | 84 | 85 | 86 | 87 | 88 | 89 | 90 | 91 | 92 | 93 |
|---|---|---|---|---|---|---|---|---|---|---|---|---|---|---|---|---|---|
| 100 metres | 11 | | | • | • | • | • | • | • | | • | • | | • | • | • | |
| 200 metres | 10 | • | | • | • | • | • | | • | | • | • | | • | | • | |
| 60 metres indoor | 6 | | • | | • | | • | | • | | | | | | • | | • |
| 200 metres indoor | 3 | | | • | | | | • | | | | • | | | | | |

== See also ==
- Italian Athletics Championships - Multi winners
- Italy national athletics team - Women's more caps
- Italian records in athletics
- Italy national relay team
- Italian all-time top lists - 100 metres
- Italian all-time top lists - 200 metres
