= 1979 Mediterranean Games =

8th edition of the Mediterranean Games

VIII Mediterranean Games Split 1979
- Host city: Split, Yugoslavia
- Nations: 14
- Athletes: 2,408
- Events: 192 in 26 sports
- Opening: 15 September 1979
- Closing: 29 September 1979
- Opened by: Josip Broz Tito
- Main venue: Gradski stadion u Poljudu

The 1979 Mediterranean Games, officially known as the VIII Mediterranean Games, and commonly known as Split 1979, were the 8th Mediterranean Games. The Games were held in Split, Yugoslavia, from 15 to 29 September 1979, where 2,408 athletes (2,009 men and 399 women) from 14 countries participated. There were a total of 192 medal events from 26 different sports.

The games' mascot was a Mediterranean monk seal named Adrijana.

== Bidding process ==
The proposal for Split to host the Mediterranean Games was initiated in March 1969 by the local sports federation. Following a series of meetings and negotiations with national sports bodies in Zagreb and Belgrade, Split secured the right to submit a bid, surpassing Rijeka due to its stronger sporting tradition. Algiers was nevertheless selected to host the 1975 Mediterranean Games with Split's bid postponed for the 1979 Games ensuring by that backing of President of Yugoslavia Josip Broz Tito. Tito highlighted the importance of Algiers hosting the Games to support the development of sports in Africa. Split's candidacy was officially confirmed in 1975, and preparations commenced, including the construction of new facilities such as Poljud Stadium and additional venues in Split and nearby towns. The 1979 Games took place against the backdrop of global tensions, including the Soviet invasion of Afghanistan and conflicts in the Middle East.

== Development and preparation ==
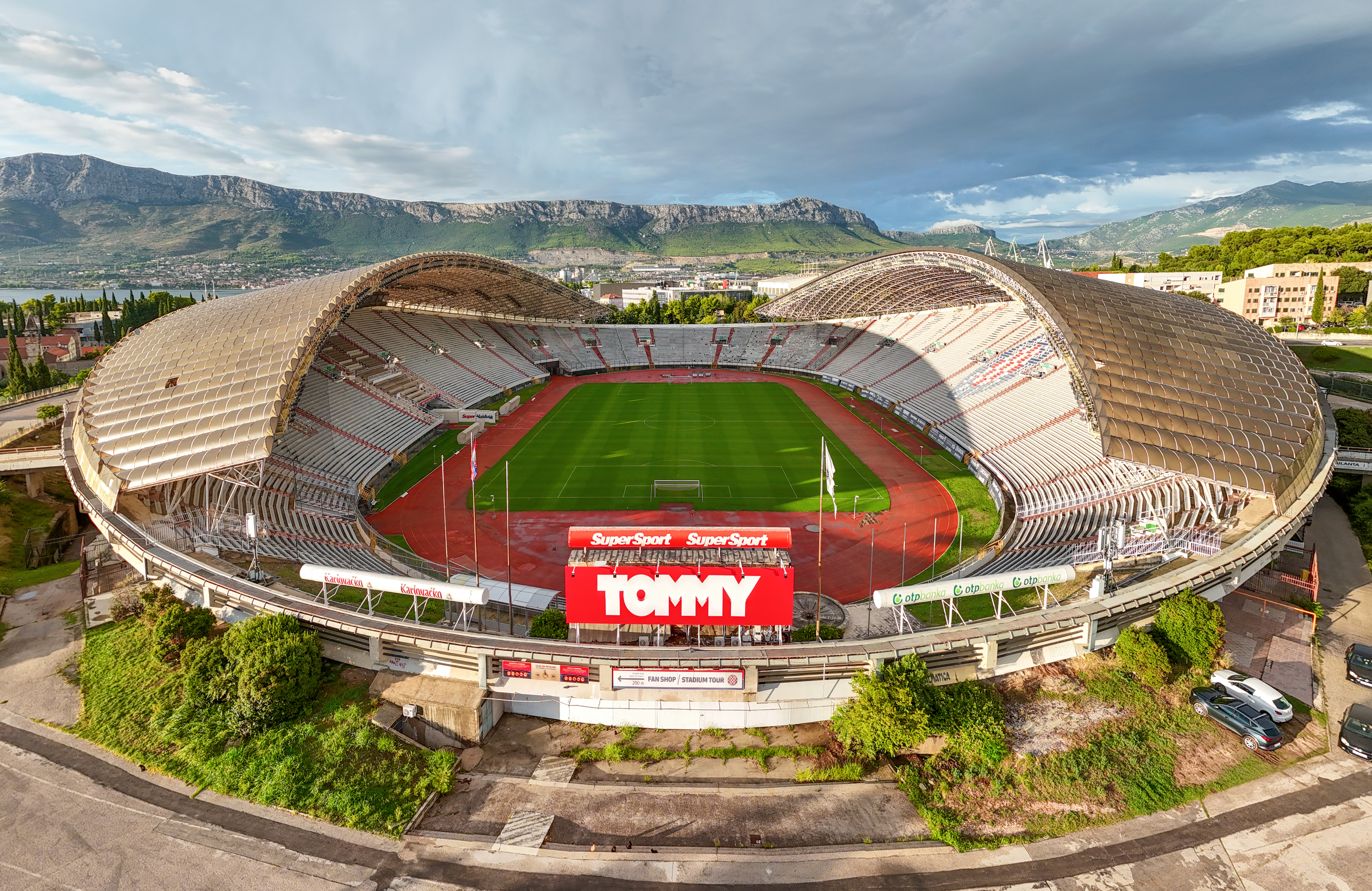
Stadion Poljud built to host the Games (photo from 2024)

Since Split could not bear the full financial burden, the Games were recognized as a pan-Yugoslav event, and funding was sourced through solidarity and cooperation between Yugoslavia's socialist republics and autonomous provinces. The Federal Executive Council established the Committee of the VIII Mediterranean Games to oversee preparations. Key figures included Stane Dolanc and several vice-presidents and committee members from politics, sports, and business. Dolanc acknowledged existing problems among Mediterranean countries and suggested that the Games could foster positive processes. The Games also facilitated diplomatic engagements, such as discussion between Josip Broz Tito and Rabah Bitat regarding the outcomes of the 6th Summit of the Non-Aligned Movement in Havana, Cuba and a formal visit from Malian President Moussa Traoré.

== Sports ==
The sports program featured 192 events. The number in parentheses next to the sport is the number of medal events per sport.

- Archery (2)
- Athletics (37)
- Basketball (1)
- Boxing (11)
- Canoeing (13)
- Cycling (2)
- Diving (4)
- Equestrian (2)
- Fencing (4)
- Field hockey (1)
- Football (1)
- Gymnastics (14)
- Handball (2)
- Judo (8)
- Rowing (8)
- Rugby union (1)
- Sailing (3)
- Shooting (8)
- Swimming (26)
- Table tennis (7)
- Tennis (4)
- Volleyball (2)
- Water polo (1)
- Weightlifting (10)
- Wrestling (20)

== Medal table ==
* Host nation (Yugoslavia)

Rank	Nation	Gold	Silver	Bronze	Total
1	Yugoslavia*	56	38	33	127
2	France	55	40	34	129
3	Italy	49	63	47	159
4	Spain	16	20	32	68
5	Greece	7	10	13	30
6	Turkey	5	5	14	24
7	Egypt	3	9	10	22
8	Algeria	1	5	10	16
9	Tunisia	1	2	9	12
10	Lebanon	1	1	0	2
11	Syria	1	0	0	1
12	Morocco	0	2	3	5
Totals (12 entries)		195	195	205	595

== Participating nations ==
The following is a list of nations that participated in the 1979 Mediterranean Games:

- Algeria (136)
- Egypt (205)
- France (287)
- Greece (195)
- Italy (368)
- Lebanon (13)
- Malta (68)
- Monaco (5)
- Morocco (106)
- Spain (263)
- Syria (11)
- Tunisia (154)
- Turkey (188)
- Yugoslavia (409)

== Broadcasting ==
Mediteranpress, originally launched as a monthly publication to provide updates on the preparation of the Games, became a weekly newspaper in early 1979. It was produced by editorial teams from "Sport" (Belgrade), "Sportske novosti" (Zagreb), and "Slobodna Dalmacija" (Split), and the Yugoslav news agency Tanjug widely distributed its content. During the Games, Mediteranpress evolved into a daily publication, serving as the official newspaper in Serbo-Croatian and French, with copies available in Arabic. Key articles were translated into English, French, and Arabic and distributed abroad.

== See also ==
- 1984 Winter Olympics
- 1987 Summer Universiade
