= 1983 Mediterranean Games =

Ninth edition of the Mediterranean Games

IX Mediterranean Games Casablanca 1983
- Host city: Casablanca, Morocco
- Nations: 16
- Athletes: 2,192
- Events: 162 in 20 sports
- Opening: 3 September 1983
- Closing: 17 September 1983
- Opened by: Hassan II
- Main venue: Stade Mohamed V

The IX Mediterranean Games (Arabic: ألعاب البحر الأبيض المتوسط 1983, romanized: Alʻāb al-Baḥr al-Abyaḍ al-Mutawassiṭ 1983), commonly known as the 1983 Mediterranean Games, were the 9th Mediterranean Games. The Games were held in Casablanca, Morocco, from 3 to 17 September 1983, where 2,192 athletes (1,845 men and 347 women) from 16 countries participated. There were a total of 162 medal events from 20 different sports.

== Participating nations ==
The following is a list of nations that participated in the 1983 Mediterranean Games:

- Algeria (172)
- Cyprus (6)
- Egypt (189)
- France (233)
- Greece (198)
- Italy (274)
- Lebanon (34)
- Libya (63)
- Malta (31)
- Monaco (8)
- Morocco (251)
- Spain (184)
- Syria (49)
- Tunisia (99)
- Turkey (190)
- Yugoslavia (211)

== Sports ==
- Athletics
- Basketball
- Boxing
- Cycling
- Diving
- Equestrian
- Fencing
- Football
- Golf (demonstration sport)
- Gymnastics
- Handball
- Judo
- Rugby union
- Sailing
- Swimming
- Tennis
- Volleyball
- Water polo
- Weightlifting
- Wrestling

== Medal table ==
* Host nation (Morocco)

Rank	Nation	Gold	Silver	Bronze	Total
1	Italy	53	43	46	142
2	France	32	39	26	97
3	Spain	17	20	27	64
4	Yugoslavia	16	18	19	53
5	Turkey	12	5	14	31
6	Greece	11	10	13	34
7	Morocco*	8	5	7	20
8	Algeria	4	3	7	14
9	Tunisia	4	1	4	9
10	Egypt	1	9	12	22
11	Lebanon	1	2	0	3
12	Syria	0	3	2	5
Totals (12 entries)		159	158	177	494

== See also ==
- International Mediterranean Games Committee
- Mediterranean Games Athletic results at gbrathletics website
