= 1981 IAAF World Cross Country Championships – Senior women's race =

Senior women's race at the 1981 IAAF World Cross Country Championships
- Organisers: IAAF
- Edition: 9th
- Date: March 28
- Host city: Madrid, Spain
- Venue: Hipódromo de la Zarzuela
- Events: 1
- Distances: 4.41 km – Senior women
- Participation: 118 athletes from 22 nations

The Senior women's race at the 1981 IAAF World Cross Country Championships was held in Madrid, Spain, at the Hipódromo de la Zarzuela on March 28, 1981. A report on the event was given in the Glasgow Herald.

Complete results, medallists, and the results of British athletes were published.

== Race results ==
=== Senior women's race (4.41 km) ===
==== Individual ====
Rank	Athlete	Country	Time
1st place, gold medalist(s)	Grete Waitz	Norway	14:07
2nd place, silver medalist(s)	Jan Merrill	United States	14:22
3rd place, bronze medalist(s)	Yelena Sipatova	Soviet Union	14:22
4	Agnese Possamai	Italy	14:25
5	Tatyana Sychova	Soviet Union	14:25
6	Betty Springs	United States	14:28
7	Svetlana Ulmasova	Soviet Union	14:28
8	Debbie Scott	Canada	14:31
9	Tatyana Pozdnyakova	Soviet Union	14:34
10	Asunción Sinobas	Spain	14:38
11	Dorthe Rasmussen	Denmark	14:39
12	Dianne Zorn	New Zealand	14:39
13	Julie Shea	United States	14:41
14	Christine Benning	England	14:41
15	Mary Shea	United States	14:42
16	Ingrid Kristiansen	Norway	14:47
17	Lynn Kanuka	Canada	14:47
18	Rosa Mota	Portugal	14:49
19	Cornelia Bürki	Switzerland	14:50
20	Carla Beurskens	Netherlands	14:51
21	Irina Bondarchuk	Soviet Union	14:55
22	Jane Furniss	England	14:56
23	Cristina Tomasini	Italy	14:57
24	Joëlle De Brouwer	France	14:59
25	Mary O'Connor	New Zealand	15:00
26	Lorraine Moller	New Zealand	15:00
27	Anne Audain	New Zealand	15:02
28	Paula Fudge	England	15:02
29	Silvana Cruciata	Italy	15:02
30	Brenda Webb	United States	15:02
31	Sheila Currie	Canada	15:02
32	Giana Romanova	Soviet Union	15:02
33	Alba Milana	Italy	15:02
34	Deirdre Nagle	Ireland	15:02
35	Gail Rear	New Zealand	15:02
36	Francie Larrieu	United States	15:02
37	Annick Lebreton	France	15:08
38	Fionnuala Morrish	Ireland	15:08
39	Patricia Appleby	Ireland	15:08
40	Veronica Poryckyj	Canada	15:08
41	Francine Peeters	Belgium	15:09
42	Sandra Arthurton	England	15:09
43	Amelia Lorza Lopez	Spain	15:09
44	Helena Heikkinen	Finland	15:13
45	Carole Bradford	Wales	15:13
46	Nadia Dandolo	Italy	15:13
47	Gunvor Hilde	Norway	15:13
48	Martine Bouchonneau	France	15:13
49	Marina Loddo	Italy	15:13
50	Kath Binns	England	15:13
51	Anne Lord	Australia	15:13
52	Marie-Christine Deurbroeck	Belgium	15:13
53	Annie van Stiphout	Netherlands	15:19
54	Monique Seys	Belgium	15:19
55	Mercedes Calleja	Spain	15:19
56	Carol Meagan	Ireland	15:24
57	Elise Wattendorf	Switzerland	15:25
58	Tuija Toivonen	Finland	15:25
59	Mona Kleppe	Norway	15:25
60	Hilary Hollick	Wales	15:25
61	Alison Wiley	Canada	15:32
62	Desiree Leatherby	Australia	15:32
63	Barbara Moore	New Zealand	15:32
64	Alice Silva	Portugal	15:32
65	Wendy Smith	England	15:35
66	Mehan Sloane	Australia	15:35
67	Saskia Brouwer	Netherlands	15:35
68	Christine Price	Scotland	15:35
69	Randi Bjørn	Norway	15:35
70	Denise Verhaert	Belgium	15:40
71	Pilar Fernandez	Spain	15:40
72	Marleen Meuris	Belgium	15:40
73	Aurora Cunha	Portugal	15:40
74	Patricia Marchand	France	15:40
75	Lynne MacDougall	Scotland	15:40
76	Mercedes Buceta	Spain	15:40
77	Tuula Konttinen	Finland	15:40
78	Joke Bruggen	Netherlands	15:40
79	Yvonne Murray	Scotland	15:40
80	Isabelle Matthys	France	15:40
81	Marga Wiegman	Netherlands	15:50
82	Silvia Ruegger	Canada	15:50
83	Zehava Shmueli	Israel	15:50
84	Vreni Forster	Switzerland	15:50
85	Päivi Pihlajamäki	Finland	15:50
86	Rosemary Longstaff	Australia	15:50
87	Bronwen Cardy	Wales	15:50
88	Charlotte Kaagh	Denmark	15:50
89	Gaylene Clews	Australia	15:50
90	Siobhan Treacy	Ireland	15:50
91	Mie Poulsen Jensen	Denmark	15:59
92	Tina Krebs	Denmark	15:59
93	Rhonda Mallinder	Australia	15:59
94	Susana Irazusta	Spain	15:59
95	Alison Wright	Scotland	16:01
96	Maria Steels	Belgium	16:06
97	Wilma Rusman	Netherlands	16:06
98	Regina Gonçalves	Portugal	16:06
99	Albertina Machado	Portugal	16:06
100	Patricia Deneuville	France	16:07
101	Jean Lochhead	Wales	16:13
102	Ulla Nielsen	Denmark	16:17
103	Barbara Harvie	Scotland	16:17
104	Daniela Gassmann	Switzerland	16:22
105	Carey May	Ireland	16:28
106	Yana Jones	Wales	16:30
107	Mette Holm Hansen	Denmark	16:32
108	Kathy Williams	Wales	16:35
109	Hilde Stavik	Norway	16:40
110	Linsey Macdonald	Scotland	16:55
111	Francisca Xavier	Angola	17:33
112	Rosa Neves	Angola	17:56
113	Sara Tavares	Angola	18:12
114	Maria Silva	Angola	18:22
115	Gertimulda Sepulveda	Angola	18:40
116	Isabel Andre	Angola	18:46
—	Rita Borralho	Portugal	DNF
—	Maricica Puică	Romania	DNF

==== Teams ====
Rank	Team	Points
1st place, gold medalist(s)	Soviet Union: Yelena Sipatova / 3; Tatyana Sychova / 5; Svetlana Ulmasova / 7; Tatyana Pozdnyakova / 9; (Irina Bondarchuk) / (21); (Giana Romanova) / (32)	24
2nd place, silver medalist(s)	United States: Jan Merrill / 2; Betty Springs / 6; Julie Shea / 13; Mary Shea / 15; (Brenda Webb) / (30); (Francie Larrieu) / (36)	36
3rd place, bronze medalist(s)	Italy: Agnese Possamai / 4; Cristina Tomasini / 23; Silvana Cruciata / 29; Alba Milana / 33; (Nadia Dandolo) / (46); (Marina Loddo) / (49)	89
4	New Zealand: Dianne Zorn / 12; Mary O'Connor / 25; Lorraine Moller / 26; Anne Audain / 27; (Gail Rear) / (35); (Barbara Moore) / (63)	90
5	Canada: Debbie Scott / 8; Lynn Kanuka / 17; Sheila Currie / 31; Veronica Poryckyj / 40; (Alison Wiley) / (61); (Silvia Ruegger) / (82)	96
6	England: Christine Benning / 14; Jane Furniss / 22; Paula Fudge / 28; Sandra Arthurton / 42; (Kath Binns) / (50); (Wendy Smith) / (65)	106
7	Norway: Grete Waitz / 1; Ingrid Kristiansen / 16; Gunvor Hilde / 47; Mona Kleppe / 59; (Randi Bjørn) / (69); (Hilde Stavik) / (109)	123
8	Ireland: Deirdre Nagle / 34; Fionnuala Morrish / 38; Patricia Appleby / 39; Carol Meagan / 56; (Siobhan Treacy) / (90); (Carey May) / (105)	167
9	Spain: Asunción Sinobas / 10; Amelia Lorza Lopez / 43; Mercedes Calleja / 55; Pilar Fernandez / 71; (Mercedes Buceta) / (76); (Susana Irazusta) / (94)	179
10	France: Joëlle Debrouwer / 24; Annick Lebreton / 37; Martine Bouchonneau / 48; Patricia Marchand / 74; (Isabelle Matthys) / (80); (Patricia Deneuville) / (100)	183
11	Belgium: Francine Peeters / 41; Marie-Christine Deurbroeck / 52; Monique Seys / 54; Denise Verhaert / 70; (Marleen Meuris) / (72); (Maria Steels) / (96)	217
12	Netherlands: Carla Beurskens / 20; Annie van Stiphout / 53; Saskia Brouwer / 67; Joke Bruggen / 78; (Marga Wiegman) / (81); (Wilma Rusman) / (97)	218
13	Portugal: Rosa Mota / 18; Alice Silva / 64; Aurora Cunha / 73; Regina Gonçalves / 98; (Albertina Machado) / (99); (Rita Borralho) / (DNF)	253
14	Finland: Helena Heikkinen / 44; Tuija Toivonen / 58; Tuula Konttinen / 77; Päivi Pihlajamäki / 85	264
15	Switzerland: Cornelia Bürki / 19; Elise Wattendorf / 57; Vreni Forster / 84; Daniela Gassmann / 104	264
16	Australia: Anne Lord / 51; Desiree Leatherby / 62; Mehan Sloane / 66; Rosemary Longstaff / 86; (Gaylene Clews) / (89); (Rhonda Mallinder) / (93)	265
17	Denmark: Dorthe Rasmussen / 11; Charlotte Kaagh / 88; Mie Poulsen Jensen / 91; Tina Krebs / 92; (Ulla Nielsen) / (102); (Mette Holm Hansen) / (107)	282
18	Wales: Carole Bradford / 45; Hilary Hollick / 60; Bronwen Cardy / 87; Jean Lochhead / 101; (Yana Jones) / (106); (Kathy Williams) / (108)	293
19	Scotland: Christine Price / 68; Lynne MacDougall / 75; Yvonne Murray / 79; Alison Wright / 95; (Barbara Harvie) / (103); (Linsey Macdonald) / (110)	317
20	Angola: Francisca Xavier / 111; Rosa Neves / 112; Sara Tavares / 113; Maria Silva / 114; (Gertimulda Sepulveda) / (115); (Isabel Andre) / (116)	450

- Note: Athletes in parentheses did not score for the team result

== Participation ==
An unofficial count yields the participation of 118 athletes from 22 countries in the Senior women's race. This is in agreement with the official numbers as published.

- Angola (6)
- Australia (6)
- Belgium (6)
- Canada (6)
- Denmark (6)
- England (6)
- Finland (4)
- France (6)
- Ireland (6)
- Israel (1)
- Italy (6)
- Netherlands (6)
- New Zealand (6)
- Norway (6)
- Portugal (6)
- Romania (1)
- Scotland (6)
- Soviet Union (6)
- Spain (6)
- Switzerland (4)
- United States (6)
- Wales (6)

== See also ==
- 1981 IAAF World Cross Country Championships – Senior men's race
- 1981 IAAF World Cross Country Championships – Junior men's race
