= 1980 IAAF World Cross Country Championships – Senior women's race =

Senior women's race at the 1980 IAAF World Cross Country Championships
- Organisers: IAAF
- Edition: 8th
- Date: March 9
- Host city: Paris, France
- Venue: Hippodrome de Longchamp
- Events: 1
- Distances: 4.82 km – Senior women
- Participation: 104 athletes from 20 nations

The Senior women's race at the 1980 IAAF World Cross Country Championships was held in Paris, France, at the Hippodrome de Longchamp on March 9, 1980. A report on the event was given in the Evening Times.

Complete results, medallists, and the results of British athletes were published.

== Race results ==
=== Senior women's race (4.82 km) ===
==== Individual ====
Rank	Athlete	Country	Time
1st place, gold medalist(s)	Grete Waitz	Norway	15:05
2nd place, silver medalist(s)	Irina Bondarchuk	Soviet Union	15:49
3rd place, bronze medalist(s)	Yelena Chernysheva	Soviet Union	15:52
4	Giana Romanova	Soviet Union	15:53
5	Jan Merrill	United States	15:57
6	Svetlana Ulmasova	Soviet Union	16:00
7	Penny Forse	England	16:04
8	Ellen Wessinghage	West Germany	16:05
9	Kath Binns	England	16:06
10	Margaret Groos	United States	16:09
11	Raisa Smekhnova	Soviet Union	16:09
12	Cristina Tomasini	Italy	16:10
13	Julie Shea	United States	16:10
14	Sandra Arthurton	England	16:15
15	Ingrid Kristiansen	Norway	16:18
16	Carla Beurskens	Netherlands	16:19
17	Nancy Rooks	Canada	16:20
18	Christine McMeekin	Scotland	16:20
19	Ruth Smeeth	England	16:20
20	Charlotte Teske	West Germany	16:22
21	Brenda Webb	United States	16:23
22	Gunvor Hilde	Norway	16:23
23	Amelia Lorza Lopez	Spain	16:24
24	Bronislawa Ludwichowska	Poland	16:24
25	Lynn Kanuka	Canada	16:25
26	Joan Benoit	United States	16:28
27	Deirdre Nagle	Ireland	16:29
28	Margherita Gargano	Italy	16:30
29	Luciana Saccol	Italy	16:31
30	Regina Joyce	England	16:36
31	Shauna Miller	Canada	16:37
32	Alba Milana	Italy	16:38
33	Mona Kleppe	Norway	16:40
34	Sylvie Bornet	France	16:41
35	Ellison Goodall	United States	16:42
36	Silvana Cruciata	Italy	16:44
37	Sara Neil	Canada	16:44
38	Marleen Mols	Belgium	16:44
39	Sabine Ladurner	Italy	16:44
40	Mie Poulsen Jensen	Denmark	16:46
41	Elvira Hofmann	West Germany	16:47
42	Elise Wattendorf	Switzerland	16:48
43	Véronique Renties	France	16:49
44	Martine Bouchonneau	France	16:50
45	Tatyana Sychova	Soviet Union	16:51
46	Magda Ilands	Belgium	16:51
47	Rita Aerts	Belgium	16:52
48	Fionnuala Morrish	Ireland	16:52
49	Maria Chwaszczynska	Poland	16:53
50	Pilar Fernandez	Spain	16:59
51	Francine Peeters	Belgium	16:59
52	Asuncion Sinobas	Spain	17:03
53	Jacqueline Lefeuvre	France	17:03
54	Wanda Panfil	Poland	17:06
55	Mercedes Calleja	Spain	17:09
56	Montserrat Abello	Spain	17:10
57	Mercedes Buceta	Spain	17:10
58	Hilary Hollick	Wales	17:10
59	Carol Meagan	Ireland	17:11
60	Renata Kokowska	Poland	17:11
61	Mary Purcell	Ireland	17:11
62	Veronica Duffy	Ireland	17:14
63	Angelika Stephan	West Germany	17:15
64	Rita Schlebert	Switzerland	17:15
65	Veronica Poryckyj	Canada	17:17
66	Denise Verhaert	Belgium	17:18
67	Susan Olsen	Denmark	17:19
68	Zehava Shmueli	Israel	17:19
69	Anette Hansen	Denmark	17:22
70	Brigit de Nijs	Netherlands	17:22
71	Marie-Christine Christiaens	Belgium	17:23
72	Kathy Williams	Wales	17:23
73	Fiona McQueen	Scotland	17:24
74	Yana Jones	Wales	17:24
75	Nathalie Abelard	France	17:25
76	Leila Boudina	Algeria	17:30
77	Frederica Sieders	Netherlands	17:31
78	Dorthe Rasmussen	Denmark	17:34
79	Barbara Harvie	Scotland	17:34
80	Angela Mason	England	17:34
81	Connie Olsen	Denmark	17:42
82	Carole Bradford	Wales	17:42
83	Oddrun Mosling	Norway	17:43
84	Karin de Nijs	Netherlands	17:49
85	Mébarka El Hadj Abdellah	Algeria	17:56
86	Tineke Kluft	Netherlands	17:59
87	Annie Rindt	Netherlands	17:59
88	Margaret Coomber	Scotland	18:04
89	Sonia McLaren	Scotland	18:04
90	Vreni Forster	Switzerland	18:07
91	Kim Lock	Wales	18:09
92	Siobhan Treacy	Ireland	18:21
93	Malika Bellounis	Algeria	18:22
94	Rachel Halle	Israel	18:24
95	Joëlle De Brouwer	France	18:34
96	Joyce Mehaffey	Northern Ireland	18:42
97	Sheila Doyle	Northern Ireland	18:44
98	Trudy Kenward	Wales	18:47
99	Kerry Robinson	Scotland	19:10
100	Anna Bukis	Poland	19:13
101	Roisin Smyth	Northern Ireland	19:30
102	Avril McClung	Northern Ireland	19:48
103	Susan Beattie	Northern Ireland	20:21
—	Vera Kemper	West Germany	DNF

==== Teams ====
Rank	Team	Points
1st place, gold medalist(s)	Soviet Union: Irina Bondarchuk / 2; Yelena Chernysheva / 3; Giana Romanova / 4; Svetlana Ulmasova / 6; (Raisa Smekhnova) / (11); (Tatyana Sychova) / (45)	15
2nd place, silver medalist(s)	England: Penny Forse / 7; Kath Binns / 9; Sandra Arthurton / 14; Ruth Smeeth / 19; (Regina Joyce) / (30); (Angela Mason) / (80)	49
3rd place, bronze medalist(s)	United States: Jan Merrill / 5; Margaret Groos / 10; Julie Shea / 13; Brenda Webb / 21; (Joan Benoit) / (26); (Ellison Goodall) / (35)	49
4	Norway: Grete Waitz / 1; Ingrid Christensen / 15; Gunvor Hilde / 22; Mona Kleppe / 33; (Oddrun Mosling) / (83)	71
5	Italy: Cristina Tomasini / 12; Margherita Gargano / 28; Luciana Saccol / 29; Alba Milana / 32; (Silvana Cruciata) / (36); (Sabine Ladurner) / (39)	101
6	Canada: Nancy Rooks / 17; Lynn Kanuka / 25; Shauna Miller / 31; Sara Neil / 37; (Veronica Poryckyj) / (65)	110
7	West Germany: Ellen Wessinghage / 8; Charlotte Teske / 20; Elvira Hofmann / 41; Angelika Stephan / 63; (Vera Kemper) / (DNF)	132
8	France: Sylvie Bornet / 34; Véronique Renties / 43; Martine Bouchonneau / 44; Jacqueline Lefeuvre / 53; (Nathalie Abelard) / (75); (Joëlle De Brouwer) / (95)	174
9	Spain: Amelia Lorza Lopez / 23; Pilar Fernandez / 50; Asuncion Sinobas / 52; Mercedes Calleja / 55; (Montserrat Abello) / (56); (Mercedes Buceta) / (57)	180
10	Belgium: Marleen Mols / 38; Magda Ilands / 46; Rita Aerts / 47; Francine Peeters / 51; (Denise Verhaert) / (66); (Marie-Christine Christiaens) / (71)	182
11	Poland: Bronislawa Ludwichowska / 24; Maria Chwaszczynska / 49; Wanda Panfil / 54; Renata Kokowska / 60; (Anna Bukis) / (100)	187
12	Ireland: Deirdre Nagle / 27; Fionnuala Morrish / 48; Carol Meagan / 59; Mary Purcell / 61; (Veronica Duffy) / (62); (Siobhan Treacy) / (92)	195
13	Netherlands: Carla Beurskens / 16; Brigit de Nijs / 70; Frederica Sieders / 77; Karin de Nijs / 84; (Tineke Kluft) / (86); (Annie Rindt) / (87)	247
14	Denmark: Mie Poulsen Jensen / 40; Susan Olsen / 67; Anette Hansen / 69; Dorthe Rasmussen / 78; (Connie Olsen) / (81)	254
15	Scotland: Christine McMeekin / 18; Fiona McQueen / 73; Barbara Harvie / 79; Margaret Coomber / 88; (Sonia McLaren) / (89); (Kerry Robinson) / (99)	258
16	Wales: Hilary Hollick / 58; Kathy Williams / 72; Yana Jones / 74; Carole Bradford / 82; (Kim Lock) / (91); (Trudy Kenward) / (98)	286
17	Northern Ireland: Joyce Mehaffey / 96; Sheila Doyle / 97; Roisin Smyth / 101; Avril McClung / 102; (Susan Beattie) / (103)	396

- Note: Athletes in parentheses did not score for the team result

== Participation ==
An unofficial count yields the participation of 104 athletes from 20 countries in the Senior women's race. This is in agreement with the official numbers as published.

- Algeria (3)
- Belgium (6)
- Canada (5)
- Denmark (5)
- England (6)
- France (6)
- Ireland (6)
- Israel (2)
- Italy (6)
- Netherlands (6)
- Northern Ireland (5)
- Norway (5)
- Poland (5)
- Scotland (6)
- Soviet Union (6)
- Spain (6)
- Switzerland (3)
- United States (6)
- Wales (6)
- West Germany (5)

== See also ==
- 1980 IAAF World Cross Country Championships – Senior men's race
- 1980 IAAF World Cross Country Championships – Junior men's race
