= Tatyana Sychova =

Georgian long-distance runner (born 1957)

Personal information
- Born: 29 November 1957 (age 68)

Sport
- Country: Soviet Union
- Sport: Athletics
- Event(s): Cross country running, 3000 metres

Achievements and titles
- Personal best: 3000 m: 8:33.9 (1980)
Medal record
World Cross Country Championships
Gold medal – first place	1980 Paris	Team
Gold medal – first place	1981 Madrid	Team

Tatyana Aleksandrovna Sychova (née Mekhanoshina, Russian: Татьяна Александровна Сычёва-Механошина; born 29 November 1957) is a Georgian long-distance runner. She twice represented the Soviet Union at the IAAF World Cross Country Championships, finishing fifth at the 1981 race and 45th at the 1980 race. Both times she shared in the team gold medals, running alongside teammates including Yelena Sipatova, Tatyana Sychova, Svetlana Ulmasova, Tatyana Pozdnyakova, Irina Bondarchuk, Giana Romanova, Yelena Chernysheva, and Raisa Smekhnova. She also ran at the 1981 European Cup, placing fourth in the 3000 metres.

At national level, she competed for Perm and was runner-up over 3000 m at the 1982 Soviet Indoor Athletics Championships behind Svetlana Ulmasova (setting a best of 8:55.04 minutes which remains a Georgian indoor record), runner-up to Nina Yapeyeva in the outdoor 3000 m at the 1981 Soviet Athletics Championships, seventh at the 1979 Spartakiad of the Peoples of the USSR, and third in the short race at the 1978 and 1979 Soviet Cross Country Championships.

She ran the second-fastest 3000 m time of the 1980 season, with her lifetime best of 8:33.9 minutes, set in Moscow in a runner-up performance oto world leader Sipatova.

== International competitions ==
Year	Competition	Venue	Position	Event	Notes
1980	World Cross Country Championships	Paris, France	45th	Senior race	16:51
1980	World Cross Country Championships	Paris, France	1st	Team	15 pts
1981	World Cross Country Championships	Madrid, Spain	5th	Senior race	14:25
1981	World Cross Country Championships	Madrid, Spain	1st	Team	24 pts
1981	European Cup	Bodø, Norway	4th	3000 m	8:55.69
