= 1981 IAAF World Cross Country Championships =

World Cross Country Championships

- Organisers: IAAF
- Edition: 9th
- Date: March 28
- Host city: Madrid, Spain
- Venue: La Zarzuela Hippodrome
- Events: 3
- Distances: 12 km – Senior men 7.25 km – Junior men 4.41 km – Senior women
- Participation: 460 athletes from 39 nations

The 1981 IAAF World Cross Country Championships was held in Madrid, Spain, at the Hipódromo de la Zarzuela on March 28, 1981. A report on the event was given in the Glasgow Herald.

Complete results for men, junior men, women, medallists, and the results of British athletes were published.

== Medallists ==
Event	Gold		Silver		Bronze	
Individual
Senior men (12 km)	Craig Virgin; United States	35:05	Mohammed Kedir; Ethiopia	35:07	Fernando Mamede; Portugal	35:09
Junior men (7.25 km)	Mohammed Chouri; Tunisia	22:04	Yevgeniy Zherebin; Soviet Union	22:06	Keith Brantly; United States	22:07
Senior women (4.41 km)	Grete Waitz; Norway	14:07	Jan Merrill; United States	14:22	Yelena Sipatova; Soviet Union	14:22
Team
Senior men	Ethiopia	81	United States	114	Kenya	220
Junior men	United States	23	England	61	Canada	66
Senior women	Soviet Union	24	United States	36	Italy	89

== Race results ==
=== Senior men's race (12 km) ===
Individual race
Rank	Athlete	Country	Time
1st place, gold medalist(s)	Craig Virgin	United States	35:05
2nd place, silver medalist(s)	Mohammed Kedir	Ethiopia	35:07
3rd place, bronze medalist(s)	Fernando Mamede	Portugal	35:09
4	Julian Goater	England	35:13
5	Antonio Prieto	Spain	35:18
6	Rob de Castella	Australia	35:20
7	Girma Berhanu	Ethiopia	35:22
8	Thom Hunt	United States	35:23
9	Alex Hagelsteens	Belgium	35:24
10	Pierre Levisse	France	35:26
11	Rod Dixon	New Zealand	35:30
12	El Hachami Abdenouz	Algeria	35:34
Full results

Teams
Rank	Team	Points
1st place, gold medalist(s)	Ethiopia: Mohammed Kedir / 2; Girma Berhanu / 7; Dereje Nedi / 13; Kebede Balcha / 14; Miruts Yifter / 15; Eshetu Tura / 30; (Hana Girma) / (32); (Tolossa Kotu) / (75)	81
2nd place, silver medalist(s)	United States: Craig Virgin / 1; Thom Hunt / 8; Mark Nenow / 17; Bill Donakowski / 18; Bruce Bickford / 19; George Malley / 51; (Daniel Dillon) / (63); (Mike McGuire) / (80); (Mark Muggleton) / (103)	114
3rd place, bronze medalist(s)	Kenya: Jackson Ruto / 22; Peter Koech / 24; Alfred Nyasani / 25; Sammy Mogene / 36; Wilson Musonik / 56; Some Muge / 57; (Joseph Kiptum) / (68); (Adriano Musonye) / (147); (John Rotich) / (200)	220
4	Spain	254
5	Australia	255
6	England	312
7	Algeria	350
8	Belgium	377
Full results

- Note: Athletes in parentheses did not score for the team result

=== Junior men's race (7.25 km) ===
Individual race
Rank	Athlete	Country	Time
1st place, gold medalist(s)	Mohammed Chouri	Tunisia	22:04
2nd place, silver medalist(s)	Yevgeniy Zherebin	Soviet Union	22:06
3rd place, bronze medalist(s)	Keith Brantly	United States	22:07
4	George Nicholas	United States	22:08
5	Paul Davies-Hale	England	22:19
6	John Butler	United States	22:21
7	Vincent Rousseau	Belgium	22:23
8	Salvatore Antibo	Italy	22:29
9	Francesco Panetta	Italy	22:32
10	Chris Hamilton	United States	22:32
11	Jonathan Richards	England	22:33
12	Dave Reid	Canada	22:37
Full results

Teams
Rank	Team	Points
1st place, gold medalist(s)	United States: Keith Brantly / 3; George Nicholas / 4; John Butler / 6; Chris Hamilton / 10; (Peter Warner) / (22); (Michael Pyeatt) / (23)	23
2nd place, silver medalist(s)	England: Paul Davies-Hale / 5; Jonathan Richards / 11; Mark King / 20; Christian Bloor / 25; (Philip Dixon) / (51); (Neil Rimmer) / (88)	61
3rd place, bronze medalist(s)	Canada: Dave Reid / 12; Chris Brewster / 14; Paul McCloy / 16; Allen Hugli / 24; (Marc Olesen) / (39); (Mark Orzel) / (63)	66
4	Italy	80
5	Belgium	118
6	Soviet Union	130
7	Portugal	135
8	Ireland	137
Full results

- Note: Athletes in parentheses did not score for the team result

=== Senior women's race (4.41 km) ===
Individual race
Rank	Athlete	Country	Time
1st place, gold medalist(s)	Grete Waitz	Norway	14:07
2nd place, silver medalist(s)	Jan Merrill	United States	14:22
3rd place, bronze medalist(s)	Yelena Sipatova	Soviet Union	14:22
4	Agnese Possamai	Italy	14:25
5	Tatyana Sychova	Soviet Union	14:25
6	Betty Springs	United States	14:28
7	Svetlana Ulmasova	Soviet Union	14:28
8	Debbie Scott	Canada	14:31
9	Tatyana Pozdnyakova	Soviet Union	14:34
10	Asunción Sinobas	Spain	14:38
11	Dorthe Rasmussen	Denmark	14:39
12	Dianne Zorn	New Zealand	14:39
Full results

Teams
Rank	Team	Points
1st place, gold medalist(s)	Soviet Union: Yelena Sipatova / 3; Tatyana Sychova / 5; Svetlana Ulmasova / 7; Tatyana Pozdnyakova / 9; (Irina Bondarchuk) / (21); (Giana Romanova) / (32)	24
2nd place, silver medalist(s)	United States: Jan Merrill / 2; Betty Springs / 6; Julie Shea / 13; Mary Shea / 15; (Brenda Webb) / (30); (Francie Larrieu) / (36)	36
3rd place, bronze medalist(s)	Italy: Agnese Possamai / 4; Cristina Tomasini / 23; Silvana Cruciata / 29; Alba Milana / 33; (Nadia Dandolo) / (46); (Marina Loddo) / (49)	89
4	New Zealand	90
5	Canada	96
6	England	106
7	Norway	123
8	Ireland	167
Full results

- Note: Athletes in parentheses did not score for the team result

== Medal table (unofficial) ==
Rank	Nation	Gold	Silver	Bronze	Total
1	United States (USA)	2	3	1	6
2	Soviet Union (URS)	1	1	1	3
3	Ethiopia (ETH)	1	1	0	2
4	Norway (NOR)	1	0	0	1
4	Tunisia (TUN)	1	0	0	1
6	England (ENG)	0	1	0	1
7	Canada (CAN)	0	0	1	1
7	Italy (ITA)	0	0	1	1
7	Kenya (KEN)	0	0	1	1
7	Portugal (POR)	0	0	1	1
Totals (10 entries)		6	6	6	18

- Note: Totals include both individual and team medals, with medals in the team competition counting as one medal.

== Participation ==
An unofficial count yields the participation of 460 athletes from 39 countries. This is in agreement with the official numbers as published.

- Algeria (15)
- Angola (14)
- Australia (15)
- Austria (6)
- Belgium (21)
- Canada (21)
- Czechoslovakia (2)
- Denmark (16)
- England (21)
- Ethiopia (8)
- Finland (13)
- France (20)
- Greece (8)
- Guinea (2)
- Ireland (21)
- Israel (3)
- Italy (20)
- Kenya (9)
- Lebanon (1)
- Luxembourg (1)
- Morocco (5)
- Netherlands (14)
- New Zealand (15)
- Northern Ireland (10)
- Norway (6)
- Poland (7)
- Portugal (21)
- Romania (1)
- Saudi Arabia (14)
- Scotland (20)
- Soviet Union (19)
- Spain (21)
- Sweden (1)
- Switzerland (6)
- Tunisia (13)
- Turkey (1)
- United States (21)
- Wales (20)
- West Germany (8)

== See also ==
- 1981 IAAF World Cross Country Championships – Senior men's race
- 1981 IAAF World Cross Country Championships – Junior men's race
- 1981 IAAF World Cross Country Championships – Senior women's race
- 1981 in athletics (track and field)
