= 1980 IAAF World Cross Country Championships =

- Organisers: IAAF
- Edition: 8th
- Date: March 9
- Host city: Paris, France
- Venue: Hippodrome de Longchamp
- Events: 3
- Distances: 12.58 km – Senior men 7.41 km – Junior men 4.82 km – Senior women
- Participation: 381 athletes from 28 nations

The 1980 IAAF World Cross Country Championships was held in Paris, France, at the Hippodrome de Longchamp on March 9, 1980. A report on the event was given in the Evening Times.

Complete results for men, junior men, women, medallists, and the results of British athletes were published.

== Medallists ==
Event	Gold		Silver		Bronze	
Individual
Senior men (12.58 km)	Craig Virgin; United States	37:01	Hans-Jürgen Orthmann; West Germany	37:02	Nick Rose; England	37:05
Junior men (7.41 km)	Jorge García; Spain	22:17	Valeriy Gryaznov; Soviet Union	22:23	Ed Eyestone; United States	22:27
Senior women (4.82 km)	Grete Waitz; Norway	15:05	Irina Bondarchuk; Soviet Union	15:49	Yelena Chernysheva; Soviet Union	15:52
Team
Senior men	England	100	United States	163	Belgium	175
Junior men	Soviet Union	50	United States	75	Spain	79
Senior women	Soviet Union	15	England	49	United States	49

== Race results ==
=== Senior men's race (12.58 km) ===
Individual race
Rank	Athlete	Country	Time
1st place, gold medalist(s)	Craig Virgin	United States	37:01
2nd place, silver medalist(s)	Hans-Jürgen Orthmann	West Germany	37:02
3rd place, bronze medalist(s)	Nick Rose	England	37:05
4	Léon Schots	Belgium	37:11
5	John Robson	Scotland	37:20
6	Aleksandr Antipov	Soviet Union	37:21
7	Leonid Moseyev	Soviet Union	37:21
8	Antonio Prieto	Spain	37:21
9	Steve Jones	Wales	37:23
10	Bernie Ford	England	37:25
11	Karel Lismont	Belgium	37:27
12	Daniel Dillon	United States	37:28
Full results

Teams
Rank	Team	Points
1st place, gold medalist(s)	England: Nick Rose / 3; Bernie Ford / 10; Barry Smith / 14; Steve Kenyon / 17; Nick Lees / 19; Graham Tuck / 37; (Hugh Jones) / (40); (Nick Brawn) / (64); (Barry Knight) / (92)	100
2nd place, silver medalist(s)	United States: Craig Virgin / 1; Daniel Dillon / 12; Kenneth Martin / 23; Steve Plasencia / 36; Don Clary / 43; Mark Anderson / 48; (Duncan Macdonald) / (104); (Jon Sinclair) / (116); (Guy Arbogast) / (DNF)	163
3rd place, bronze medalist(s)	Belgium: Léon Schots / 4; Karel Lismont / 11; Alex Hagelsteens / 21; Eddy de Pauw / 38; Frank Grillaert / 44; Roger de Vogel / 57; (Johan Geirnaert) / (107); (Willy Polleunis) / (DNF); (Robert Lismont) / (DNF)	175
4	France	184
5	Soviet Union	246
6	Spain	251
7	Scotland	312
8	Algeria	324
Full results

- Note: Athletes in parentheses did not score for the team result

=== Junior men's race (7.41 km) ===
Individual race
Rank	Athlete	Country	Time
1st place, gold medalist(s)	Jorge García	Spain	22:17
2nd place, silver medalist(s)	Valeriy Gryaznov	Soviet Union	22:23
3rd place, bronze medalist(s)	Ed Eyestone	United States	22:27
4	Denis Stark	Canada	22:34
5	Tom Downs	United States	22:34
6	Sergey Kiselyov	Soviet Union	22:36
7	Ildar Denikeyev	Soviet Union	22:38
8	Guy Léfèvre	Belgium	22:41
9	Andrea Prassedi	Italy	22:47
10	Paul Davies-Hale	England	22:52
11	William Graham	United States	22:53
12	Gary Huckwell	England	22:58
Full results

Teams
Rank	Team	Points
1st place, gold medalist(s)	Soviet Union: Valeriy Gryaznov / 2; Sergey Kiselyov / 6; Ildar Denikeyev / 7; Sergey Mishin / 35; (Dmitriy Ditlashok) / (52)	50
2nd place, silver medalist(s)	United States: Ed Eyestone / 3; Tom Downs / 5; William Graham / 11; Eric Sappenfield / 56; (Daniel Caprioglio) / (82); (Farron Fields) / (88)	75
3rd place, bronze medalist(s)	Spain: Jorge García / 1; José Fernández / 20; Miguel Rubio / 24; Julio Perez / 34; (Pedro Garin) / (51); (Francisco Erneta) / (61)	79
4	Belgium	86
5	England	89
6	Canada	90
7	Italy	101
8	Algeria	136
Full results

- Note: Athletes in parentheses did not score for the team result

=== Senior women's race (4.82 km) ===
Individual race
Rank	Athlete	Country	Time
1st place, gold medalist(s)	Grete Waitz	Norway	15:05
2nd place, silver medalist(s)	Irina Bondarchuk	Soviet Union	15:49
3rd place, bronze medalist(s)	Yelena Chernysheva	Soviet Union	15:52
4	Giana Romanova	Soviet Union	15:53
5	Jan Merrill	United States	15:57
6	Svetlana Ulmasova	Soviet Union	16:00
7	Penny Forse	England	16:04
8	Ellen Wessinghage	West Germany	16:05
9	Kath Binns	England	16:06
10	Margaret Groos	United States	16:09
11	Raisa Smekhnova	Soviet Union	16:09
12	Cristina Tomasini	Italy	16:10
Full results

Teams
Rank	Team	Points
1st place, gold medalist(s)	Soviet Union: Irina Bondarchuk / 2; Yelena Chernysheva / 3; Giana Romanova / 4; Svetlana Ulmasova / 6; (Raisa Smekhnova) / (11); (Tatyana Sychova) / (45)	15
2nd place, silver medalist(s)	England: Penny Forse / 7; Kath Binns / 9; Sandra Arthurton / 14; Ruth Smeeth / 19; (Regina Joyce) / (30); (Angela Mason) / (80)	49
3rd place, bronze medalist(s)	United States: Jan Merrill / 5; Margaret Groos / 10; Julie Shea / 13; Brenda Webb / 21; (Joan Benoit) / (26); (Ellison Goodall) / (35)	49
4	Norway	71
5	Italy	101
6	Canada	110
7	West Germany	132
8	France	174
Full results

- Note: Athletes in parentheses did not score for the team result

== Medal table (unofficial) ==
Rank	Nation	Gold	Silver	Bronze	Total
1	Soviet Union (URS)	2	2	1	5
2	United States (USA)	1	2	2	5
3	England (ENG)	1	1	1	3
4	Spain (ESP)	1	0	1	2
5	Norway (NOR)	1	0	0	1
6	West Germany (FRG)	0	1	0	1
7	Belgium (BEL)	0	0	1	1
Totals (7 entries)		6	6	6	18

- Note: Totals include both individual and team medals, with medals in the team competition counting as one medal.

== Participation ==
An unofficial count yields the participation of 381 athletes from 28 countries. This is in agreement with the official numbers as published.

- Algeria (17)
- Belgium (21)
- Canada (18)
- China (3)
- Czechoslovakia (2)
- Denmark (16)
- England (21)
- Finland (9)
- France (21)
- Hungary (4)
- Ireland (21)
- Israel (4)
- Italy (20)
- Morocco (7)
- Netherlands (14)
- Northern Ireland (19)
- Norway (7)
- Poland (5)
- Portugal (8)
- Scotland (21)
- Soviet Union (17)
- Spain (21)
- Sweden (8)
- Switzerland (3)
- Tunisia (14)
- United States (21)
- Wales (20)
- West Germany (19)

== See also ==
- 1980 IAAF World Cross Country Championships – Senior men's race
- 1980 IAAF World Cross Country Championships – Junior men's race
- 1980 IAAF World Cross Country Championships – Senior women's race
- 1980 in athletics (track and field)
