= World Athletics Cross Country Championships =

Competition in international cross country running

- Status: active
- Genre: sports event
- Date: March
- Frequency: biennial
- Location: various
- Inaugurated: 1973
- Most recent: 2026 World Athletics Cross Country Championships
- Organiser: World Athletics

World Athletics Cross Country Championships is the most important competition in international cross country running. Formerly held annually and organised by World Athletics (formerly the IAAF), it was inaugurated in 1973, when it replaced the International Cross Country Championships. It was an annual competition until 2011, when World Athletics changed it to a biennial event.

== History ==
Traditionally, the World Cross Country Championships consisted of four races: one each for men (12 km) and for women (8 km); and one each for junior men (8 km) and for junior women (6 km). Scoring was done for individuals and for national teams. In the team competition, the finishing positions of the top six scorers from a team of up to nine are summed for the men and women, respectively, and the lowest score wins. For the junior races, the top three from a team of up to four are scored.

The year 1998 saw the introduction of two new events at the World Cross Country Championships, a short race for men and a short race for women. The last time these 4 km races were held was 2006, and there are no public plans to bring them back.

The senior men's team race was won by Ethiopia or Kenya every year from 1981 to 2017 in both the short and long races. In the senior men's 12 km race, Kenya won the world championships 18 years in a row, from 1986 through 2003, a record of unequaled international success. On the women's side, only one other nation has won the long team race since 1991, namely, Portugal in 1994. These African nations were not as dominant in the short races, but they have won every women's junior race since its introduction in 1989.

Several athletes have won two or more individual titles: Craig Virgin, who is the only American to ever win at World Cross Country Championships, which he did twice; Carlos Lopes, the first man to win three times (although Jack Holden won the International Cross Country Championships four times between 1933 and 1939, Gaston Roelants between 1962 and 1972); John Ngugi, the first man to win five times; Paul Tergat, the first man to win five times in a row; Kenenisa Bekele, the only man to win both the short and long courses in the same year, which he did five years in a row, and whose win in 2008 gave him six long course championships, the most of anyone in history; Sonia O'Sullivan, first athlete ever to win both the long and short course double in the same year; Grete Waitz, the first woman to win five times (although Doris Brown Heritage won the International Cross Country Championships five times between 1967 and 1971); Lynn Jennings, who won three times; Derartu Tulu, who won three times; Tirunesh Dibaba, who won three times in the long course and once in the short course; Zola Budd, who became the youngest ever winner when she won in 1985 and then won again in 1986; Gete Wami, who won twice at the long course and once at the short; and Edith Masai, who won the short race three times. Tirunesh Dibaba was also once the junior women's champion.

Many consider the World Cross Country Championships to be the most difficult races to win, even more difficult than the Olympic Games. At most major championships, the world's best distance runners are separated into a few races, i.e. 3000 m Steeplechase, 5000 m, and 10,000 m. However, in the absence of the short course races, the World Cross Country Championships pit all runners against one another in only one race. Thus, the competition is quite fierce. It's no wonder, then, that several Olympic Champions have gotten their start as World Cross Country Champions: Carlos Lopes, marathon, 1984; John Ngugi, 5000 m, 1988; Khalid Skah, 10,000 m, 1992; and Kenenisa Bekele, 10,000 m, 2004 and 2008. Numerous other champions have medalled at the Olympic Games or the World Championships, or have set World Records.

In the 206th IAAF Council Meeting, held after the 2016 Summer Olympics, the council decided to add a mixed-gender relay race to the World Cross Country Championships schedule – a first for the event.

== Editions ==
Edition	Year	City	Country	Date	Venue	No. of Countries	No. of Athletes
1st	1973	Waregem	Belgium	17 March	Hippodroom Waregem	21	286
2nd	1974	Monza	Italy	16 March	Mirabello Racecourse	23	269
3rd	1975	Rabat	Morocco	16 March	Souissi Racecourse	26	316
4th	1976	Chepstow	United Kingdom	28 February	Chepstow Racecourse	21	306
5th	1977	Düsseldorf	West Germany	20 March	Galopprennbahn Düsseldorf-Grafenberg	22	345
6th	1978	Glasgow	United Kingdom	25 March	Bellahouston Park	27	358
7th	1979	Limerick	Ireland	25 March	Greenpark Racecourse	27	383
8th	1980	Paris	France	9 March	Hippodrome de Longchamp	28	381
9th	1981	Madrid	Spain	28 March	Hipódromo de la Zarzuela	39	460
10th	1982	Rome	Italy	21 March	Ippodromo delle Capannelle	33	382
11th	1983	Gateshead	United Kingdom	20 March	Riverside Park	35	431
12th	1984	East Rutherford	United States	25 March	Meadowlands Racetrack	40	443
13th	1985	Lisbon	Portugal	24 March	Sports Complex of Jamor	50	570
14th	1986	Colombier	Switzerland	23 March	Planeyse Colombier	57	670
15th	1987	Warsaw	Poland	22 March	Służewiec Racecourse	47	576
16th	1988	Auckland	New Zealand	26 March	Ellerslie Racecourse	41	441
17th	1989	Stavanger	Norway	19 March	Scanvest Ring	41	568
18th	1990	Aix-les-Bains	France	25 March	Hippodrome de Marlioz	59	617
19th	1991	Antwerp	Belgium	24 March	Linkeroever Racecourse	51	633
20th	1992	Boston	United States	21 March	Franklin Park	53	580
21st	1993	Amorebieta	Spain	28 March	Jaureguibarría Course	54	653
22nd	1994	Budapest	Hungary	26 March	Kincsem Park	60	760
23rd	1995	Durham	United Kingdom	25 March	University of Durham	58	619
24th	1996	Stellenbosch	South Africa	23 March	Danie Craven Stadium	65	669
25th	1997	Turin	Italy	23 March	Parco del Valentino	72	725
26th	1998	Marrakesh	Morocco	21/22 March	Menara district	66	707
27th	1999	Belfast	United Kingdom	27/28 March	Barnett Demesne	66	759
28th	2000	Vilamoura	Portugal	18/19 March	Sporting Complex of Vilamoura	76	805
29th	2001	Ostend	Belgium	24/25 March	Hippodrome Wellington	67	790
30th	2002	Dublin	Ireland	23/24 March	Leopardstown Racecourse	59	664
31st	2003	Lausanne	Switzerland	29/30 March	Institut équestre national d'Avenches	65	605
32nd	2004	Brussels	Belgium	20/21 March	Ossegem Park	72	673
33rd	2005	Saint-Galmier	France	19/20 March	Hippodrome Joseph-Desjoyaux	72	695
34th	2006	Fukuoka	Japan	1/2 April	Umi-no-nakamichi Seaside Park	59	574
35th	2007	Mombasa	Kenya	24 March	Mombasa Golf Course	63	470
36th	2008	Edinburgh	United Kingdom	30 March	Holyrood Park	23	448
37th	2009	Amman	Jordan	28 March	Al Bisharat Golf Course	57	459
38th	2010	Bydgoszcz	Poland	28 March	Myślęcinek Park	59	437
39th	2011	Punta Umbría	Spain	20 March	Polideportivo Antonio Gil Hernández	51	423
40th	2013	Bydgoszcz	Poland	24 March	Myślęcinek Park	41	398
41st	2015	Guiyang	China	28 March	Guiyang horse racing circuit	51	410
42nd	2017	Kampala	Uganda	26 March	Kololo Independence Grounds	60	557
43rd	2019	Aarhus	Denmark	30 March	Moesgaard Museum	63	520
44th	2023	Bathurst	Australia	18 February	Mount Panorama Circuit	48	453
45th	2024	Belgrade	Serbia	30 March	Park of Friendship	51	485
46th	2026	Tallahassee	United States	10 January	Apalachee Regional Park	52	485

== Doping ==
As in other areas of the sport, athletes at the competition are prohibited from doping and tests are undertaken before and at the championships to ensure athletes obey the regulations. A total of fourteen doping violations have occurred at the World Cross Country Championships, with the first violation coming from Cosmas Ndeti who was the original runner-up at the 1988 junior men's race; he remains the only athlete stripped of a medal for doping. Seven doping violations have come from Moroccan athletes, with Portuguese athletes accounting for a further three. The 2010 and 2011 editions had the highest number of doping violations, with totals of four and five, respectively. The senior men's long race has produced the highest number of violations, with eight in total.

Year	Athlete	Country	Race	Original placing
1988	Cosmas Ndeti	Kenya	Junior men	2nd
2002	Hamid El Mouaziz	Morocco	Men's long	44th
2006	Yuliya Mochalova	Russia	Junior women	24th
2007	Binnaz Uslu	Turkey	Women's	DNF
2008	Fethi Meftah	Algeria	Men's	35th
2010	Chakir Boujattaoui	Morocco	Men's	12th
2010	Ahmed Baday	Morocco	Men's	29th
2010	Hélder Ornelas	Portugal	Men's	75th
2010	Hanane Ouhaddou	Morocco	Women's	56th
2011	Nuno Costa	Portugal	Men's	34th
2011	José Rocha	Portugal	Men's	41st
2011	Hafid Chani	Morocco	Men's	DNF
2011	Najim El Gady	Morocco	Men's	DNF
2011	Hanane Ouhaddou	Morocco	Women's	81st
2024	Emmaculate Anyango	Kenya	Women's	4th
2024	Anjelina Nadai Lohalith	ART	Women's	23rd

== Medals ==
=== Senior Men's Individual Medals ===
Year	Gold		Silver		Bronze	
1973 (11.98 km)	Pekka Päivärinta; Finland	35:46.4	Mariano Haro; Spain	35:46.5	Rod Dixon; New Zealand	36:00
1974 (12 km)	Eric de Beck; Belgium	35:23.8	Mariano Haro; Spain	35:24.6	Karel Lismont; Belgium	35:26.6
1975 (12 km)	Ian Stewart; Scotland	35:20	Mariano Haro; Spain	35:21	Bill Rodgers; United States	35:27.4
1976 (12 km)	Carlos Lopes; Portugal	34:47.8	Tony Simmons; England	35:04	Bernie Ford; England	35:07
1977 (12.3 km)	Léon Schots; Belgium	37:43	Carlos Lopes; Portugal	37:48.2	Detlef Uhlemann; West Germany	37:52.2
1978 (12.3 km)	John Treacy; Ireland	39:25	Aleksandr Antipov; Soviet Union	39:28	Karel Lismont; Belgium	39:32
1979 (12 km)	John Treacy; Ireland	37:20	Bronisław Malinowski; Poland	37:29	Aleksandr Antipov; Soviet Union	37:30
1980 (12.58 km)	Craig Virgin; United States	37:01	Hans-Jürgen Orthmann; West Germany	37:02	Nick Rose; England	37:05
1981 (12 km)	Craig Virgin; United States	35:05	Mohammed Kedir; Ethiopia	35:07	Fernando Mamede; Portugal	35:09
1982 (11.978 km)	Mohammed Kedir; Ethiopia	33:40.5	Alberto Salazar; United States	33:44.8	Rod Dixon; New Zealand	34:01.8
1983 (11.994 km)	Bekele Debele; Ethiopia	36:52	Carlos Lopes; Portugal	36:52	Some Muge; Kenya	36:52
1984 (12.086 km)	Carlos Lopes; Portugal	33:25	Tim Hutchings; England	33:30	Steve Jones; Wales	33:32
1985 (12.19 km)	Carlos Lopes; Portugal	33:33	Paul Kipkoech; Kenya	33:37	Wodajo Bulti; Ethiopia	33:38
1986 (12 km)	John Ngugi; Kenya	35:32.9	Abebe Mekonnen; Ethiopia	35:34.8	Joseph Kiptum; Kenya	35:39.8
1987 (11.95 km)	John Ngugi; Kenya	36:07	Paul Kipkoech; Kenya	36:07	Paul Arpin; France	36:51
1988 (12 km)	John Ngugi; Kenya	34:32	Paul Kipkoech; Kenya	34:54	Kipsubai Koskei; Kenya	35:07
1989 (12 km)	John Ngugi; Kenya	39:42	Tim Hutchings; United Kingdom	40:10	Wilfred Kirochi; Kenya	40:21
1990 (12.2 km)	Khalid Skah; Morocco	34:21	Moses Tanui; Kenya	34:21	Julius Korir; Kenya	34:22
1991 (11.764 km)	Khalid Skah; Morocco	33:53	Moses Tanui; Kenya	33:54	Simon Karori; Kenya	33:54
1992 (12.53 km)	John Ngugi; Kenya	37:05	William Mutwol; Kenya	37:17	Fita Bayissa; Ethiopia	37:18
1993 (11.75 km)	William Sigei; Kenya	32:51	Dominic Kirui; Kenya	32:56	Ismael Kirui; Kenya	32:59
1994 (12.06 km)	William Sigei; Kenya	34:29	Simon Chemoiywo; Kenya	34:30	Haile Gebrselassie; Ethiopia	34:32
1995 (12.02 km)	Paul Tergat; Kenya	34:05	Ismael Kirui; Kenya	34:13	Salah Hissou; Morocco	34:14
1996 (12.15 km)	Paul Tergat; Kenya	33:44	Salah Hissou; Morocco	33:56	Ismael Kirui; Kenya	33:57
1997 (12.333 km)	Paul Tergat; Kenya	35:11	Salah Hissou; Morocco	35:13	Tom Nyariki; Kenya	35:20
1998 (12 km)	Paul Tergat; Kenya	34:01	Paul Koech; Kenya	34:06	Assefa Mezegebu; Ethiopia	34:28
1999 (12 km)	Paul Tergat; Kenya	38:28	Patrick Ivuti; Kenya	38:32	Paulo Guerra; Portugal	38:46
2000 (12.3 km)	Mohammed Mourhit; Belgium	35:00	Assefa Mezegebu; Ethiopia	35:01	Paul Tergat; Kenya	35:02
2001 (12.3 km)	Mohammed Mourhit; Belgium	39:53	Sergiy Lebid; Ukraine	40:03	Charles Kamathi; Kenya	40:05
2002 (11.998 km)	Kenenisa Bekele; Ethiopia	34:52	John Yuda; Tanzania	34:58	Wilberforce Talel; Kenya	35:20
2003 (12.355 km)	Kenenisa Bekele; Ethiopia	35:56	Patrick Ivuti; Kenya	36:09	Gebre-egziabher Gebremariam; Ethiopia	36:17
2004 (12 km)	Kenenisa Bekele; Ethiopia	35:52	Gebre-egziabher Gebremariam; Ethiopia	36:10	Sileshi Sihine; Ethiopia	36:11
2005 (12.02 km)	Kenenisa Bekele; Ethiopia	35:06	Zersenay Tadesse; Eritrea	35:20	Abdullah Ahmed Hassan; Qatar	35:34
2006 (12 km)	Kenenisa Bekele; Ethiopia	35:40	Sileshi Sihine; Ethiopia	35:43	Martin Mathathi; Kenya	35:44
2007 (12 km)	Zersenay Tadese; Eritrea	35:50	Moses Mosop; Kenya	36:13	Bernard Kiprop Kipyego; Kenya	36:37
2008 (12 km)	Kenenisa Bekele; Ethiopia	34:38	Leonard Patrick Komon; Kenya	34:41	Zersenay Tadese; Eritrea	34:43
2009 (12 km)	Gebre-egziabher Gebremariam; Ethiopia	35:02	Moses Ndiema Kipsiro; Uganda	35:04	Zersenay Tadese; Eritrea	35:04
2010 (11.611 km)	Joseph Ebuya; Kenya	33:00	Teklemariam Medhin; Eritrea	33:06	Moses Ndiema Kipsiro; Uganda	33:10
2011 (12 km)	Imane Merga; Ethiopia	33:50	Paul Kipngetich Tanui; Kenya	33:52	Vincent Kiprop Chepkok; Kenya	33:53
2013 (12 km)	Japhet Kipyegon Korir; Kenya	32:45	Imane Merga; Ethiopia	32:51	Teklemariam Medhin; Eritrea	32:54
2015 (12 km)	Geoffrey Kipsang Kamworor; Kenya	34:52	Bedan Karoki Muchiri; Kenya	35:00	Muktar Edris; Ethiopia	35:06
2017 (9.858 km)	Geoffrey Kipsang Kamworor; Kenya	28:24	Leonard Barsoton; Kenya	28:36	Abadi Hadis; Ethiopia	28:43
2019 (10 km)	Joshua Cheptegei; Uganda	31:40	Jacob Kiplimo; Uganda	31:44	Geoffrey Kipsang Kamworor; Kenya	31:55
2023 (10 km)	Jacob Kiplimo; Uganda	29:17	Berihu Aregawi; Ethiopia	29:26	Joshua Cheptegei; Uganda	29:37
2024 (10 km)	Jacob Kiplimo; Uganda	28:09	Berihu Aregawi; Ethiopia	28:12	Benson Kiplangat; Kenya	28:14
2026 (10 km)	Jacob Kiplimo; Uganda	28:18	Berihu Aregawi; Ethiopia	28:36	Daniel Ebenyo; Kenya	28:45

=== Senior Men's Team Medals ===
Year	Gold		Silver		Bronze	
1973	Belgium	109	Soviet Union	119	New Zealand	136
1974	Belgium	103	England	109	France	215
1975	New Zealand	127	England	198	Belgium	211
1976	England	90	Belgium	118	France	187
1977	Belgium	126	England	129	Soviet Union	144
1978	France	151	United States	156	England	159
1979	England	119	Ireland	198	Soviet Union	210
1980	England	100	United States	163	Belgium	175
1981	Ethiopia	81	United States	114	Kenya	220
1982	Ethiopia	98	England	114	Soviet Union	257
1983	Ethiopia	104	United States	170	Kenya	191
1984	Ethiopia	134	United States	161	Portugal	223
1985	Ethiopia	129	Kenya	141	United States	153
1986	Kenya	45	Ethiopia	119	United States	204
1987	Kenya	53	England	146	Ethiopia	161
1988	Kenya	23	Ethiopia	103	France	134
1989	Kenya	44	United Kingdom	147	Ethiopia	162
1990	Kenya	42	Ethiopia	96	Spain	176
1991	Kenya	38	Ethiopia	104	Spain	198
1992	Kenya	46	France	145	United Kingdom	147
1993	Kenya	25	Ethiopia	82	Portugal	167
1994	Kenya	34	Morocco	83	Ethiopia	133
1995	Kenya	62	Morocco	111	Spain	120
1996	Kenya	33	Morocco	99	Ethiopia	107
1997	Kenya	51	Morocco	70	Ethiopia	125
1998	Kenya	12	Ethiopia	57	Morocco	60
1999	Kenya	12	Ethiopia	57	Portugal	76
2000	Kenya	18	Ethiopia	68	Portugal	69
2001	Kenya	33	France	72	United States	87
2002	Kenya	18	Ethiopia	43	Morocco	58
2003	Kenya	17	Ethiopia	23	Morocco	51
2004	Ethiopia	14	Kenya	30	Eritrea	66
2005	Ethiopia	24	Kenya	35	Qatar	42
2006	Kenya	24	Eritrea	28	Ethiopia	42
2007	Kenya	29	Morocco	152	Uganda	191
2008	Kenya	39	Ethiopia	104	Qatar	143
2009	Kenya	28	Ethiopia	28	Eritrea	50
2010	Kenya	20	Eritrea	46	Ethiopia	69
2011	Kenya	14	Ethiopia	38	Uganda	49
2013	Ethiopia	38	United States	52	Kenya	54
2015	Ethiopia	20	Kenya	20	Bahrain	54
2017	Ethiopia	21	Kenya	22	Uganda	72
2019	Uganda	20	Ethiopia	46	Kenya	58
2023	Kenya	22	Ethiopia	32	Uganda	37
2024	Kenya	19	Uganda	31	Ethiopia	40
2026	Ethiopia	30	Kenya	34	Uganda	39

=== Senior Men's Team Medal table ===
Rank	Nation	Gold	Silver	Bronze	Total
1	Kenya	26	5	4	35
2	Ethiopia	10	15	8	33
3	England	3	5	1	9
4	Belgium	3	1	2	6
5	France	1	2	3	6
6	Uganda	1	1	4	6
7	New Zealand	1	0	1	2
8	United States	0	6	3	9
9	Morocco	0	5	3	8
10	Eritrea	0	2	2	4
11	Soviet Union	0	1	3	4
12	Great Britain	0	1	1	2
13	Ireland	0	1	0	1
14	Portugal	0	0	4	4
15	Spain	0	0	3	3
16	Qatar	0	0	2	2
17	Bahrain	0	0	1	1
Totals (17 entries)		45	45	45	135

=== Senior Women's Individual Medals ===
Year	Gold		Silver		Bronze	
1973 (3.99 km)	Paola Pigni; Italy	13:45.2	Joyce Smith; England	13:58	Josee van Santberghe; Belgium	14:01
1974 (4 km)	Paola Pigni; Italy	12:42	Nina Holmén; Finland	12:47.6	Rita Ridley; England	12:54
1975 (3.9 km)	Julie Brown; United States	13:42	Bronislawa Ludwichowska; Poland	13:47	Carmen Valero; Spain	13:48
1976 (4.8 km)	Carmen Valero; Spain	16:19.4	Tatyana Kazankina; Soviet Union	16:39	Gabriella Dorio; Italy	16:56
1977 (5.1 km)	Carmen Valero; Spain	17:26	Lyudmila Bragina; Soviet Union	17:28	Giana Romanova; Soviet Union	17:35
1978 (4.728 km)	Grete Waitz; Norway	16:19	Natalia Mărăşescu; Romania	16:49	Maricica Puică; Romania	16:59
1979 (5.04 km)	Grete Waitz; Norway	16:48	Raisa Smekhnova; Soviet Union	17:14	Ellison Goodall; United States	17:18
1980 (4.82 km)	Grete Waitz; Norway	15:05	Irina Bondarchuk; Soviet Union	15:49	Yelena Chernysheva; Soviet Union	15:52
1981 (4.41 km)	Grete Waitz; Norway	14:07	Jan Merrill; United States	14:22	Yelena Sipatova; Soviet Union	14:22
1982 (4.663 km)	Maricica Puică; Romania	14:38.9	Fiţa Lovin; Romania	14:40.5	Grete Waitz; Norway	14:43.9
1983 (4.072 km)	Grete Waitz; Norway	13:29	Alison Wiley; Canada	13:37	Tatyana Pozdnyakova; Soviet Union	13:37
1984 (5 km)	Maricica Puică; Romania	15:56	Galina Zakharova; Soviet Union	15:58	Grete Waitz; Norway	15:58
1985 (4.99 km)	Zola Budd; England	15:01	Cathy Branta; United States	15:24	Ingrid Kristiansen; Norway	15:27
1986 (4.65 km)	Zola Budd; England	14:49.6	Lynn Jennings; United States	15:07.8	Annette Sergent; France	15:12.2
1987 (5.05 km)	Annette Sergent; France	16:46	Liz Lynch; Scotland	16:48	Ingrid Kristiansen; Norway	16:51
1988 (5.962 km)	Ingrid Kristiansen; Norway	19:04	Angela Tooby; United Kingdom	19:23	Annette Sergent; France	19:29
1989 (6 km)	Annette Sergent; France	22:27	Nadezhda Stepanova; Soviet Union	22:34	Lynn Williams; Canada	22:41
1990 (6 km)	Lynn Jennings; United States	19:21	Albertina Dias; Portugal	19:33	Yelena Romanova; Soviet Union	19:33
1991 (6.425 km)	Lynn Jennings; United States	20:24	Derartu Tulu; Ethiopia	20:27	Liz McColgan; United Kingdom	20:28
1992 (6.37 km)	Lynn Jennings; United States	21:16	Catherina McKiernan; Ireland	21:18	Albertina Dias; Portugal	21:19
1993 (6.35 km)	Albertina Dias; Portugal	20:00	Catherina McKiernan; Ireland	20:09	Lynn Jennings; United States	20:09
1994 (6.22 km)	Hellen Chepngeno; Kenya	20:45	Catherina McKiernan; Ireland	20:52	Conceição Ferreira; Portugal	20:52
1995 (6.47 km)	Derartu Tulu; Ethiopia	20:21	Catherina McKiernan; Ireland	20:29	Sally Barsosio; Kenya	20:39
1996 (6.3 km)	Gete Wami; Ethiopia	20:12	Rose Cheruiyot; Kenya	20:18	Naomi Mugo; Kenya	20:21
1997 (6.6 km)	Derartu Tulu; Ethiopia	20:53	Paula Radcliffe; United Kingdom	20:55	Gete Wami; Ethiopia	21:00
1998 (8 km)	Sonia O'Sullivan; Ireland	25:39	Paula Radcliffe; United Kingdom	25:42	Gete Wami; Ethiopia	25:49
1999 (8.012 km)	Gete Wami; Ethiopia	28:00	Merima Denboba; Ethiopia	28:12	Paula Radcliffe; United Kingdom	28:12
2000 (8.08 km)	Derartu Tulu; Ethiopia	25:42	Gete Wami; Ethiopia	25:48	Susan Chepkemei; Kenya	25:50
2001 (7.7 km)	Paula Radcliffe; United Kingdom	27:49	Gete Wami; Ethiopia	27:52	Lydia Cheromei; Kenya	28:07
2002 (7.974 km)	Paula Radcliffe; United Kingdom	26:55	Deena Drossin; United States	27:04	Colleen de Reuck; United States	27:17
2003 (7.92 km)	Worknesh Kidane; Ethiopia	25:53	Deena Drossin; United States	26:02	Merima Denboba; Ethiopia	26:28
2004 (8 km)	Benita Johnson; Australia	27:17	Ejagayehu Dibaba; Ethiopia	27:29	Worknesh Kidane; Ethiopia	27:34
2005 (8.108 km)	Tirunesh Dibaba; Ethiopia	26:34	Alice Timbilil; Kenya	26:37	Worknesh Kidane; Ethiopia	26:37
2006 (8 km)	Tirunesh Dibaba; Ethiopia	25:21	Lornah Kiplagat; Netherlands	25:26	Meselech Melkamu; Ethiopia	25:38
2007 (8 km)	Lornah Kiplagat; Netherlands	26:23	Tirunesh Dibaba; Ethiopia	26:47	Meselech Melkamu; Ethiopia	26:48
2008 (7.905 km)	Tirunesh Dibaba; Ethiopia	25:10	Mestawet Tufa; Ethiopia	25:15	Linet Chepkwemoi Masai; Kenya	25:18
2009 (8 km)	Florence Jebet Kiplagat; Kenya	26:13	Linet Chepkwemoi Masai; Kenya	26:16	Meselech Melkamu; Ethiopia	26:19
2010 (7.759 km)	Emily Chebet; Kenya	24:19	Linet Chepkwemoi Masai; Kenya	24:20	Meselech Melkamu; Ethiopia	24:26
2011 (8 km)	Vivian Jepkemoi Cheruiyot; Kenya	24:58	Linet Chepkwemoi Masai; Kenya	25:07	Shalane Flanagan; United States	25:10
2013 (8 km)	Emily Chebet; Kenya	24:24	Hiwot Ayalew; Ethiopia	24:27	Belaynesh Oljira; Ethiopia	24:33
2015 (8 km)	Agnes Jebet Tirop; Kenya	26:01	Senbere Teferi; Ethiopia	26:06	Netsanet Gudeta; Ethiopia	26:11
2017 (9.858 km)	Irene Cheptai; Kenya	31:57	Alice Aprot Nawowuna; Kenya	32:01	Lilian Rengeruk; Kenya	32:11
2019 (10 km)	Hellen Obiri; Kenya	36:14	Dera Dida; Ethiopia	36:16	Letesenbet Gidey; Ethiopia	36:24
2023 (10 km)	Beatrice Chebet; Kenya	33:48	Tsigie Gebreselama; Ethiopia	33:56	Agnes Jebet Ngetich; Kenya	34:00
2024 (10 km)	Beatrice Chebet; Kenya	31:05	Lilian Kasait Rengeruk; Kenya	31:08	Margaret Kipkemboi; Kenya	31:09
2026 (10 km)	Agnes Jebet Ngetich; Kenya	31:28	Joy Cheptoyek; Uganda	32:10	Senayet Getachew; Ethiopia	32:13

=== Senior Women's Team Medals ===
Year	Gold		Silver		Bronze	
1973	England	40	Finland	73	United States	90
1974	England	28	Italy	50	Finland	61
1975	United States	44	New Zealand	50	Poland	61
1976	Soviet Union	33	Italy	59	United States	64
1977	Soviet Union	15	United States	48	New Zealand	76
1978	Romania	30	United States	37	England	55
1979	United States	29	Soviet Union	48	England	68
1980	Soviet Union	15	England	49	United States	49
1981	Soviet Union	24	United States	36	Italy	89
1982	Soviet Union	44	Italy	57	England	67
1983	United States	31	Soviet Union	41	Canada	53
1984	United States	52	England	65	New Zealand	91
1985	United States	42	Soviet Union	77	Romania	96
1986	England	65	New Zealand	67	France	76
1987	United States	46	France	50	Soviet Union	55
1988	Soviet Union	51	United Kingdom	61	France	72
1989	Soviet Union	58	France	60	United States	68
1990	Soviet Union	37	Ethiopia	75	Portugal	80
1991	Kenya	36	Ethiopia	36	Soviet Union	48
1992	Kenya	47	United States	77	Ethiopia	96
1993	Kenya	52	Japan	93	France	100
1994	Portugal	55	Ethiopia	65	Kenya	75
1995	Kenya	26	Ethiopia	38	Romania	84
1996	Kenya	24	Ethiopia	44	Romania	70
1997	Ethiopia	24	Kenya	34	Ireland	64
1998	Kenya	30	Ethiopia	37	United Kingdom	74
1999	Ethiopia	18	Kenya	27	Portugal	94
2000	Ethiopia	20	Kenya	23	United States	98
2001	Kenya	18	Ethiopia	70	France	77
2002	Ethiopia	28	United States	38	Kenya	41
2003	Ethiopia	17	Kenya	30	United States	36
2004	Ethiopia	26	Kenya	30	United Kingdom	74
2005	Ethiopia	16	Kenya	22	Portugal	86
2006	Ethiopia	16	Kenya	39	Japan	80
2007	Ethiopia	19	Kenya	26	Morocco	99
2008	Ethiopia	18	Kenya	22	Australia	84
2009	Kenya	14	Ethiopia	28	Portugal	72
2010	Kenya	14	Ethiopia	22	United States	76
2011	Kenya	15	Ethiopia	29	United States	57
2013	Kenya	19	Ethiopia	48	Bahrain	73
2015	Ethiopia	17	Kenya	19	Uganda	101
2017	Kenya	10	Ethiopia	45	Bahrain	59
2019	Ethiopia	21	Kenya	25	Uganda	36
2023	Kenya	16	Ethiopia	25	Uganda	41
2024	Kenya	10	Ethiopia	41	Uganda	44
2026	Ethiopia	19	Kenya	36	Uganda	37

=== Men's Short Race Individual Medals ===
Year	Gold		Silver		Bronze	
1998 (4 km)	John Kibowen; Kenya	10:43	Daniel Komen; Kenya	10:46	Paul Kosgei; Kenya	10:50
1999 (4.236 km)	Benjamin Limo; Kenya	12:28	Paul Kosgei; Kenya	12:31	Haylu Mekonnen; Ethiopia	12:35
2000 (4.18 km)	John Kibowen; Kenya	11:11	Sammy Kipketer; Kenya	11:12	Paul Kosgei; Kenya	11:15
2001 (4.1 km)	Enock Koech; Kenya	12:40	Kenenisa Bekele; Ethiopia	12:42	Benjamin Limo; Kenya	12:43
2002 (4.208 km)	Kenenisa Bekele; Ethiopia	12:11	Luke Kipkosgei; Kenya	12:18	Haylu Mekonnen; Ethiopia	12:20
2003 (4.03 km)	Kenenisa Bekele; Ethiopia	11:01	John Kibowen; Kenya	11:04	Benjamin Limo; Kenya	11:06
2004 (4 km)	Kenenisa Bekele; Ethiopia	11:31	Gebre-egziabher Gebremariam; Ethiopia	11:36	Maregu Zewdie; Ethiopia	11:42
2005 (4.196 km)	Kenenisa Bekele; Ethiopia	11:33	Abraham Chebii; Kenya	11:38	Isaac Songok; Kenya	11:39
2006 (4 km)	Kenenisa Bekele; Ethiopia	10:54	Isaac Songok; Kenya	10:55	Adil Kaouch; Morocco	10:57

=== Men's Short Race Team Medals ===
Year	Gold		Silver		Bronze	
1998	Kenya	10	Morocco	42	Ethiopia	60
1999	Kenya	14	Morocco	45	Ethiopia	55
2000	Kenya	10	Ethiopia	46	Morocco	68
2001	Kenya	13	Morocco	48	Ethiopia	51
2002	Kenya	20	Ethiopia	32	Spain	57
2003	Kenya	14	Ethiopia	31	Morocco	44
2004	Ethiopia	17	Qatar	39	Kenya	52
2005	Ethiopia	23	Kenya	31	Qatar	32
2006	Kenya	21	Ethiopia	48	Morocco	53

=== Women's Short Race Individual Medals ===
Year	Gold		Silver		Bronze	
1998 (4 km)	Sonia O'Sullivan; Ireland	12:20	Zahra Ouaziz; Morocco	12:34	Kutre Dulecha; Ethiopia	12:37
1999 (4.236 km)	Jackline Maranga; Kenya	15:09	Yamna Belkacem; France	15:16	Annemari Sandell; Finland	15:17
2000 (4.18 km)	Kutre Dulecha; Ethiopia	13:00	Zahra Ouaziz; Morocco	13:00	Margaret Ngotho; Kenya	13:00
2001 (4.1 km)	Gete Wami; Ethiopia	14:46	Paula Radcliffe; United Kingdom	14:47	Edith Masai; Kenya	14:57
2002 (4.208 km)	Edith Masai; Kenya	13:30	Worknesh Kidane; Ethiopia	13:36	Isabella Ochichi; Kenya	13:39
2003 (4.03 km)	Edith Masai; Kenya	12:43	Worknesh Kidane; Ethiopia	12:44	Jane Wanjiku; Kenya	12:46
2004 (4 km)	Edith Masai; Kenya	13:07	Tirunesh Dibaba; Ethiopia	13:09	Teyiba Erkesso; Ethiopia	13:11
2005 (4.196 km)	Tirunesh Dibaba; Ethiopia	13:15	Worknesh Kidane; Ethiopia	13:16	Isabella Ochichi; Kenya	13:21
2006 (4 km)	Gelete Burka; Ethiopia	12:51	Prisca Ngetich; Kenya	12:53	Meselech Melkamu; Ethiopia	12:54

=== Women's Short Race Team Medals ===
Year	Gold		Silver		Bronze	
1998	Morocco	57	Ethiopia	58	United States	68
1999	France	40	Ethiopia	48	Morocco	69
2000	Portugal	46	Ethiopia	55	France	57
2001	Ethiopia	26	Kenya	32	Romania	78
2002	Ethiopia	32	Kenya	34	Ireland	85
2003	Kenya	18	Ethiopia	24	Russia	76
2004	Ethiopia	19	Kenya	21	Canada	87
2005	Ethiopia	18	Kenya	19	United States	67
2006	Ethiopia	25	Kenya	26	Australia	69

=== Junior Men's Individual Medals ===
Year	Gold		Silver		Bronze	
1973 (7 km)	Jim Brown; Scotland	20:52.8	José Haro; Spain	21:00.6	Léon Schots; Belgium	21:07.2
1974 (7.1 km)	Rich Kimball; United States	21:30.8	Venanzio Ortis; Italy	21:33	John Treacy; Ireland	21:42.4
1975 (7 km)	Bobb Thomas; United States	20:59.8	José Luis González; Spain	21:18	John Treacy; Ireland	21:23
1976 (7.8 km)	Eric Hulst; United States	23:53.8	Thom Hunt; United States	24:06.8	Nat Muir; Scotland	24:17
1977 (7.5 km)	Thom Hunt; United States	23:15	Santiago Llorente; Spain	23:28	Ari Paunonen; Finland	23:39
1978 (7.036 km)	Mick Morton; England	22:57	Rob Earl; Canada	23:10	Francisco Alario; Spain	23:11
1979 (7.36 km)	Eddy de Pauw; Belgium	23:02	Steve Binns; England	23:09	Ildar Denikeyev; Soviet Union	23:20
1980 (7.41 km)	Jordi Garcia; Spain	22:17	Valeriy Gryaznov; Soviet Union	22:23	Ed Eyestone; United States	22:27
1981 (7.25 km)	Mohammed Chouri; Tunisia	22:04	Yevgeniy Zherebin; Soviet Union	22:06	Keith Brantly; United States	22:07
1982 (7.926 km)	Zurbachev Gelaw; Ethiopia	22:45.3	Adugna Lema; Ethiopia	22:46.6	Stefano Mei; Italy	22:48.7
1983 (8.033 km)	Fesseha Abebe; Ethiopia	24:58	Angaso Telega; Ethiopia	24:59	Jonathan Richards; England	25:07
1984 (8 km)	Pere Casacuberta; Spain	21:32	Doju Tessema; Ethiopia	21:34	John Castellano; Canada	21:37
1985 (8.19 km)	Kipkemboi Kimeli; Kenya	22:18	Habte Negash; Ethiopia	22:37	Wolde Silasse Melkessa; Ethiopia	22:37
1986 (7.75 km)	Melese Feissa; Ethiopia	22:47.6	Sammy Bitok; Kenya	22:52.7	Demeke Bekele; Ethiopia	22:56
1987 (7.05 km)	Wilfred Kirochi; Kenya	22:18	Demeke Bekele; Ethiopia	22:18	Debebe Demisse; Ethiopia	22:20
1988 (8.031 km)	Wilfred Kirochi; Kenya	23:25	Alfonce Muindi; Kenya	23:39	Bedile Kibret; Ethiopia	23:41
1989 (8 km)	Addis Abebe; Ethiopia	25:07	Kipyego Kororia; Kenya	25:31	Stephenson Nyamau; Kenya	25:33
1990 (8 km)	Kipyego Kororia; Kenya	22:13	Richard Chelimo; Kenya	22:14	Fita Bayissa; Ethiopia	22:24
1991 (8.415 km)	Andrew Sambu; Tanzania	23:59	Mumo Muindi; Kenya	24:04	Fita Bayissa; Ethiopia	24:04
1992 (7.8 km)	Ismael Kirui; Kenya	23:27	Haile Gebrselassie; Ethiopia	23:35	Josephat Machuka; Kenya	23:37
1993 (7.15 km)	Philip Mosima; Kenya	20:18	Christopher Koskei; Kenya	20:20	Josephat Machuka; Kenya	20:23
1994 (8.14 km)	Philip Mosima; Kenya	24:15	Daniel Komen; Kenya	24:17	Abreham Tsige; Ethiopia	24:46
1995 (8.47 km)	Assefa Mezegebu; Ethiopia	24:12	Dejene Lidetu; Ethiopia	24:14	David Chelule; Kenya	24:16
1996 (8.35 km)	David Chelule; Kenya	24:06	Assefa Mezegebu; Ethiopia	24:19	Samuel Chepkok; Kenya	24:24
1997 (8.511 km)	Elijah Korir; Kenya	24:21	Million Wolde; Ethiopia	24:28	Paul Kosgei; Kenya	24:29
1998 (8 km)	Million Wolde; Ethiopia	22:47	Richard Limo; Kenya	22:50	Haylu Mekonnen; Ethiopia	22:51
1999 (8.012 km)	Haylu Mekonnen; Ethiopia	25:38	Richard Limo; Kenya	25:43	Kipchumba Mitei; Kenya	25:45
2000 (8.08 km)	Robert Kipchumba; Kenya	22:49	Duncan Lebo; Kenya	22:52	John Cheruiyot Korir; Kenya	22:55
2001 (7.7 km)	Kenenisa Bekele; Ethiopia	25:04	Duncan Lebo; Kenya	25:37	Dathan Ritzenhein; United States	25:46
2002 (7.974 km)	Gebre-egziabher Gebremariam; Ethiopia	23:18	Abel Cheruiyot; Kenya	23:19	Boniface Kiprop; Uganda	23:28
2003 (7.92 km)	Eliud Kipchoge; Kenya	22:47	Boniface Kiprop; Uganda	22:49	Solomon Bushendich; Kenya	22:51
2004 (8 km)	Meba Tadesse; Ethiopia	24:01	Boniface Kiprop; Uganda	24:03	Ernest Meli Kimeli; Kenya	24:16
2005 (8 km)	Augustine Choge; Kenya	23:59	Bernard Kiprop Kipyego; Kenya	24:00	Barnabas Kosgei; Kenya	24:00
2006 (8 km)	Mang'ata Ndiwa; Kenya	23:53	Leonard Patrick Komon; Kenya	23:54	Tariku Bekele; Ethiopia	23:56
2007 (8 km)	Asbel Kiprop; Kenya	24:07	Vincent Kiprop Chepkok; Kenya	24:12	Mathew Kipkoech Kisorio; Kenya	24:23
2008 (7.905 km)	Ibrahim Jeilan; Ethiopia	22:38	Ayele Abshero; Ethiopia	22:40	Lucas Kimeli Rotich; Kenya	22:42
2009 (8 km)	Ayele Abshero; Ethiopia	23:26	Titus Kipjumba Mbishei; Kenya	23:30	Moses Kibet; Uganda	23:35
2010 (7.759 km)	Caleb Mwangangi Ndiku; Kenya	22:07	Clement Kiprono Langat; Kenya	22:09	Japhet Kipyegon Korir; Kenya	22:12
2011 (8 km)	Geoffrey Kipsang Kamworor; Kenya	22:21	Thomas Ayeko; Uganda	22:27	Patrick Mutunga Mwikya; Kenya	22:32
2013 (8 km)	Hagos Gebrhiwet; Ethiopia	21:04	Leonard Barsoton; Kenya	21:08	Muktar Edris; Ethiopia	21:13
2015 (8 km)	Yasin Haji; Ethiopia	23:42	Geoffrey Kipkirui Korir; Kenya	23:47	Alfred Ngeno; Kenya	23:54
2017 (7.858 km)	Jacob Kiplimo; Uganda	22:40	Amdework Walelegn; Ethiopia	22:43	Richard Yator; Kenya	22:52
2019 (8 km)	Milkesa Mengesha; Ethiopia	23:52	Tadase Worku; Ethiopia	23:54	Oscar Chelimo; Uganda	23:55
2023 (8 km)	Ishmael Kipkurui; Kenya	24:29	Reynold Kipkorir Cheruiyot; Kenya	24:30	Boki Diriba; Ethiopia	24:31
2024 (8 km)	Samuel Kibathi; Kenya	22:40	Mezgebu Sime; Ethiopia	22:41	Matthew Kipkoech Kipruto; Kenya	22:46
2026 (8 km)	Frankline Kibet; Kenya	23:18	Emmanuel Kiprono; Kenya	23:20	Andrew Alamisi; Kenya	23:28

=== Junior Men's Team Medals ===
Year	Gold		Silver		Bronze	
1973	Spain	18	Italy	22	England	24
1974	United States	22	Morocco	58	Italy	90
1975	United States	29	Ireland	35	Spain	44
1976	United States	16	Spain	60	England	91
1977	United States	36	Spain	40	Canada	67
1978	England	53	Canada	53	Spain	54
1979	Spain	57	England	74	Soviet Union	75
1980	Soviet Union	50	United States	75	Spain	79
1981	United States	23	England	61	Canada	66
1982	Ethiopia	12	Italy	37	United States	70
1983	Ethiopia	13	Spain	41	England	58
1984	Ethiopia	21	Spain	34	England	68
1985	Ethiopia	16	Kenya	26	Spain	64
1986	Ethiopia	13	Kenya	32	Spain	52
1987	Ethiopia	19	Kenya	20	Japan	73
1988	Kenya	12	Ethiopia	33	Spain	61
1989	Kenya	14	Ethiopia	22	Italy	76
1990	Kenya	12	Ethiopia	27	Italy	85
1991	Kenya	19	Ethiopia	26	Tanzania	54
1992	Kenya	18	Ethiopia	28	Japan	90
1993	Kenya	10	Ethiopia	27	Morocco	76
1994	Kenya	18	Ethiopia	27	Morocco	78
1995	Kenya	23	Ethiopia	25	Morocco	72
1996	Kenya	13	Ethiopia	26	Morocco	94
1997	Kenya	13	Ethiopia	31	Morocco	74
1998	Ethiopia	16	Kenya	20	Morocco	66
1999	Kenya	16	Ethiopia	24	Tanzania	77
2000	Kenya	10	Ethiopia	47	Uganda	68
2001	Kenya	24	Ethiopia	25	Uganda	68
2002	Kenya	18	Ethiopia	24	Uganda	37
2003	Kenya	15	Ethiopia	28	Uganda	48
2004	Kenya	20	Ethiopia	25	Uganda	33
2005	Kenya	10	Ethiopia	37	Qatar	75
2006	Kenya	16	Ethiopia	24	Eritrea	44
2007	Kenya	10	Eritrea	44	Ethiopia	54
2008	Kenya	21	Ethiopia	28	Uganda	37
2009	Kenya	20	Ethiopia	22	Eritrea	72
2010	Kenya	10	Ethiopia	32	Uganda	56
2011	Kenya	20	Ethiopia	24	Uganda	50
2013	Ethiopia	23	Kenya	26	Morocco	65
2015	Kenya	19	Ethiopia	33	Eritrea	52
2017	Ethiopia	17	Kenya	28	Eritrea	57
2019	Ethiopia	18	Uganda	32	Kenya	34
2023	Kenya	22	Ethiopia	23	United States	81
2024	Kenya	15	Ethiopia	21	Uganda	52
2026	Kenya	10	Uganda	31	United States	75

=== Junior Women's Individual Medals ===
Year	Gold		Silver		Bronze	
1989 (4 km)	Malin Ewerlöf; Sweden	15:23	Olga Nazarkina; Soviet Union	15:30	Esther Saina; Kenya	15:41
1990 (4.4 km)	Liu Shixiang; China	14:19	Yan Qinglan; China	14:20	Susan Chepkemei; Kenya	14:22
1991 (4.435 km)	Lydia Cheromei; Kenya	13:59	Jane Ekimat; Kenya	14:20	Melody Fairchild; United States	14:28
1992 (4.005 km)	Paula Radcliffe; United Kingdom	13:30	Wang Junxia; China	13:35	Lydia Cheromei; Kenya	13:43
1993 (4.45 km)	Gladys Ondeyo; Kenya	14:04	Pamela Chepchumba; Kenya	14:09	Sally Barsosio; Kenya	14:11
1994 (4.3 km)	Sally Barsosio; Kenya	14:04	Rose Cheruiyot; Kenya	14:05	Elizabeth Cheptanui; Kenya	14:15
1995 (4.47 km)	Annemari Sandell; Finland	14:04	Jebiwot Keitany; Kenya	14:09	Nancy Kipron; Kenya	14:17
1996 (4.22 km)	Kutre Dulecha; Ethiopia	13:27	Annemari Sandell; Finland	13:32	Jepkorir Ayabei; Kenya	13:35
1997 (4.689 km)	Rose Kosgei; Kenya	14:58	Prisca Ngetich; Kenya	14:59	Ayelech Worku; Ethiopia	15:02
1998 (6 km)	Yimenashu Taye; Ethiopia	19:32	Jeruto Kiptum; Kenya	19:34	Worknesh Kidane; Ethiopia	19:34
1999 (6.124 km)	Worknesh Kidane; Ethiopia	21:26	Vivian Cheruiyot; Kenya	21:37	Yoshiko Fujinaga; Japan	21:41
2000 (6.29 km)	Vivian Cheruiyot; Kenya	20:34	Alice Timbilil; Kenya	20:35	Viola Kibiwott; Kenya	20:36
2001 (5.9 km)	Viola Kibiwott; Kenya	22:05	Abebech Nigussie; Ethiopia	22:05	Aster Bacha; Ethiopia	22:05
2002 (5.962 km)	Viola Kibiwot; Kenya	20:13	Tirunesh Dibaba; Ethiopia	20:14	Vivian Cheruiyot; Kenya	20:22
2003 (6.215)	Tirunesh Dibaba; Ethiopia	20:21	Peninah Chepchumba; Kenya	20:22	Gelete Burka; Ethiopia	20:28
2004 (6 km)	Meselech Melkamu; Ethiopia	20:48	Aziza Aliyu; Ethiopia	20:53	Mestawat Tadesse; Ethiopia	20:56
2005 (6.153 km)	Gelete Burka; Ethiopia	20:12	Veronica Wanjiru; Kenya	20:39	Beatrice Chebusit; Kenya	20:44
2006 (6 km)	Pauline Korikwiang; Kenya	19:27	Veronica Wanjiru; Kenya	19:27	Mercy Kosgei; Kenya	19:45
2007 (6 km)	Linet Chepkwemoi Barasa; Kenya	20:52	Mercy Jelimo Kosgei; Kenya	20:59	Veronica Nyaruai Wanjiru; Kenya	21:10
2008 (6.04 km)	Genzebe Dibaba; Ethiopia	19:59	Irine Chepet Cheptai; Kenya	20:04	Emebt Etea; Ethiopia	20:06
2009 (6 km)	Genzebe Dibaba; Ethiopia	20:14	Mercy Cherono; Kenya	20:17	Jackline Chepngeno; Kenya	20:27
2010 (5.833 km)	Mercy Cherono; Kenya	18:47	Purity Cherotich Rionoripo; Kenya	18:54	Esther Chemtai; Kenya	18:55
2011 (6 km)	Faith Kipyegon; Kenya	18:53	Genet Yalew; Ethiopia	18:54	Azemra Gebru; Ethiopia	18:54
2013 (6 km)	Faith Kipyegon; Kenya	17:51	Agnes Jebet Tirop; Kenya	17:51	Alemitu Heroye; Ethiopia	17:57
2015 (6 km)	Letesenbet Gidey; Ethiopia	19:48	Dera Dida; Ethiopia	19:49	Etagegn Woldu; Ethiopia	19:53
2017 (6.03 km)	Letesenbet Gidey; Ethiopia	18:34	Hawi Feysa; Ethiopia	18:57	Celliphine Chespol; Kenya	19:02
2019 (6 km)	Beatrice Chebet; Kenya	20:50	Alemitu Tariku; Ethiopia	20:50	Tsigie Gebreselama; Ethiopia	20:50
2023 (6 km)	Senayet Getachew; Ethiopia	20:53	Medina Eisa; Ethiopia	21:00	Pamela Kosgei; Kenya	21:01
2024 (6 km)	Marta Alemayo; Ethiopia	19:28	Asayech Ayichew; Ethiopia	19:32	Robe Dida; Ethiopia	19:38
2026 (6 km)	Marta Alemayo; Ethiopia	18:52	Wosane Asefa; Ethiopia	19:18	Charity Cherop; Uganda	19:19

=== Junior Women's Team Medals ===
Year	Gold		Silver		Bronze	
1989	Kenya	40	Soviet Union	68	Portugal	84
1990	Kenya	20	Japan	44	China	68
1991	Kenya	18	Ethiopia	40	Japan	43
1992	Ethiopia	55	Romania	59	Kenya	59
1993	Kenya	10	Japan	41	Ethiopia	61
1994	Kenya	11	Ethiopia	46	Japan	60
1995	Kenya	18	Ethiopia	31	Japan	56
1996	Kenya	21	Ethiopia	26	Japan	70
1997	Kenya	15	Japan	38	Ethiopia	39
1998	Ethiopia	16	Kenya	20	Japan	66
1999	Ethiopia	20	Kenya	31	Japan	46
2000	Kenya	12	Ethiopia	24	Japan	78
2001	Ethiopia	16	Kenya	20	Japan	59
2002	Kenya	13	Ethiopia	24	Japan	63
2003	Ethiopia	14	Kenya	22	Morocco	78
2004	Ethiopia	10	Kenya	36	Japan	67
2005	Kenya	16	Ethiopia	22	Japan	56
2006	Kenya	10	Ethiopia	29	Japan	58
2007	Kenya	13	Eritrea	33	Ethiopia	36
2008	Ethiopia	16	Kenya	20	Japan	57
2009	Ethiopia	18	Kenya	18	Japan	76
2010	Kenya	10	Ethiopia	30	Uganda	81
2011	Ethiopia	17	Kenya	19	Japan	75
2013	Kenya	14	Ethiopia	23	United Kingdom	81
2015	Ethiopia	11	Kenya	33	Bahrain	52
2017	Ethiopia	19	Kenya	20	Uganda	62
2019	Ethiopia	17	Kenya	26	Japan	72
2023	Ethiopia	15	Kenya	22	United States	54
2024	Ethiopia	12	Kenya	28	Uganda	48
2026	Uganda	29	Kenya	29	Japan	87

=== Mixed Relay ===
Year	Gold		Silver		Bronze	
2017	Kenya	22:22	Ethiopia	22:30	Turkey	22:37
2019	Ethiopia	25:49	Morocco	26:22	Kenya	26:29
2023	Kenya	23:14	Ethiopia	23:21	Australia	23:26
2024	Kenya	22:15	Ethiopia	22:43	United Kingdom	23:00
2026	Australia	22:23	France	22:26	Ethiopia	22:34

== See also ==
- European Cross Country Championships
- African Cross Country Championships
