= Irina Bondarchuk =

Russian female long-distance runner

Medal record

Women's athletics

Representing the Soviet Union

IAAF World Cross Country Championships
Silver medal – second place	1980 Paris	Senior race

Irina Bondarchuk (Russian: Ирина Бондарчук; born 17 September 1952) is a Russian former Soviet long-distance runner.

Bondarchuk's greatest successes were in cross country running. She was the individual silver medallist at the 1980 IAAF World Cross Country Championships and took three team titles between 1977 and 1981. She also placed fourth individually in 1979 and took a team silver medal in 1985. This was a period of much success for the Soviet women, with Lyudmila Bragina, Yelena Sipatova, Giana Romanova and Svetlana Ulmasova being other leading Soviet athletes of the time.

In track running, Bondarchuk was a four-time national champion with one indoor and one outdoor title in the 3000 metres and two titles in the 5000 metres. She was the first ever Soviet champion in the women's 5000 m in 1980, as the event was added to the standard programme that year. She represented the Soviet Union at the 1974 European Athletics Championships over 3000 m, finishing ninth.

She had her highest season ranking in the 5000 m in 1980, with her time of 15:35.0 minutes being the second best after America's Jan Merrill. She again neared the top of the profession in 1982 when she won at the Brothers Znamensky Memorial in a time of 15:12.62 minutes, placing third in the global rankings behind Mary Slaney and Grete Waitz.

Bondarchuk focused more on longer distances in her late career and set bests of 2:35:17 hours for the marathon in 1984 and 33:55.98 minutes for the 10,000 metres in 1986. Bondarchuk relocated to the United States in the 1990s and continued her long-distance career there. She made six appearances at the Austin Marathon, winning in 1994 and coming runner-up in 1995. She also had five finishes at the Houston Marathon, with her best finish being 13th place. She twice competed at the Boston Marathon (1993 and 1995) and was within the top 20 both times. She continued to compete as entered her forties and regularly finished in the top twenty of high profile American road races in the late 1990s.

== Personal bests ==
- 3000 metres – 8:42.84 min (1982)
- 5000 metres – 15:12.62 min (1982)
- 10,000 metres – 33:55.98 min (1986)
- Marathon – 2:35:17 hrs (1984)

== International competitions ==
Year	Competition	Venue	Position	Event	Notes
1974	European Championships	Rome, Italy	9th	3000 m	9:16.6
1977	World Cross Country Championships	Düsseldorf, West Germany	4th	Senior race	17:38
1977	World Cross Country Championships	Düsseldorf, West Germany	1st	Senior team	15 pts
1980	World Cross Country Championships	Paris, France	2nd	Senior race	15:49
1980	World Cross Country Championships	Paris, France	1st	Senior team	15 pts
1981	World Cross Country Championships	Madrid, Spain	21st	Senior race	14:55
1981	World Cross Country Championships	Madrid, Spain	1st	Senior team	24 pts
1985	World Cross Country Championships	Lisbon, Portugal	31st	Senior race	16:05
1985	World Cross Country Championships	Lisbon, Portugal	2nd	Senior team	77 pts
1985	Yokohama International Women's Ekiden	Yokohama, Japan	3rd	5000 m	16:06

== National titles ==
- Soviet Athletics Championships
  - 3000 metres: 1977
  - 5000 metres: 1980, 1982
- Soviet Indoor Athletics Championships
  - 3000 metres: 1976
