= 1978 European Athletics Championships – Women's 3000 metres =

Women's 3000 metres at the European Athletics Championships

The women's 3000 metres at the 1978 European Athletics Championships was held in Prague, then Czechoslovakia, at Stadion Evžena Rošického on 29 August 1978.

== Medalists ==
Gold	Svetlana Ulmasova; Soviet Union
Silver	Natalia Mărăşescu; Romania
Bronze	Grete Waitz; Norway

== Results ==
=== Final ===
29 August

Rank	Name	Nationality	Time	Notes
1st place, gold medalist(s)	Svetlana Ulmasova	Soviet Union	8:33.16	CR
2nd place, silver medalist(s)	Natalia Mărăşescu	Romania	8:33.53	
3rd place, bronze medalist(s)	Grete Waitz	Norway	8:34.33	
4	Maricica Puică	Romania	8:40.94	
5	Giana Romanova	Soviet Union	8:45.74	
6	Cornelia Bürki	Switzerland	8:46.13	
7	Raisa Belousova	Soviet Union	8:48.73	
8	Paula Fudge	Great Britain	8:48.74	
9	Ann Ford	Great Britain	8:53.08	
10	Ingrid Kristiansen	Norway	9:02.87	
11	Magdolna Lázár	Hungary	9:05.14	
12	Joëlle De Brouwer	France	9:05.21	
13	Glynis Penny	Great Britain	9:08.9	
14	Helena Ledvinová	Czechoslovakia	9:10.9	
15	Mary Purcell	Ireland	9:11.9	
16	Loa Olafsson	Denmark	9:12.0	
17	Božena Sudická	Czechoslovakia	9:12.9	
18	Bernadette Van Roy	Belgium	9:13.9	
19	Deirdre Nagle	Ireland	9:21.9	
20	Daniele Justin	Belgium	9:24.0	
21	Carla Beurskens	Netherlands	9:25.5	
22	Tineke Kluft	Netherlands	9:31.0	
23	Carmen Valero	Spain	9:34.0	
24	Miroslava Margoldová	Czechoslovakia	9:36.1	
25	Connie Olsen	Denmark	9:40.6	
	Birgit Friedmann	West Germany	DNF	

== Participation ==
According to an unofficial count, 26 athletes from 14 countries participated in the event.

- Belgium (2)
- Czechoslovakia (3)
- Denmark (2)
- France (1)
- Hungary (1)
- Ireland (2)
- Netherlands (2)
- Norway (2)
- Romania (2)
- Soviet Union (3)
- Spain (1)
- Switzerland (1)
- Great Britain (3)
- West Germany (1)
