= Craig Virgin =

American distance runner

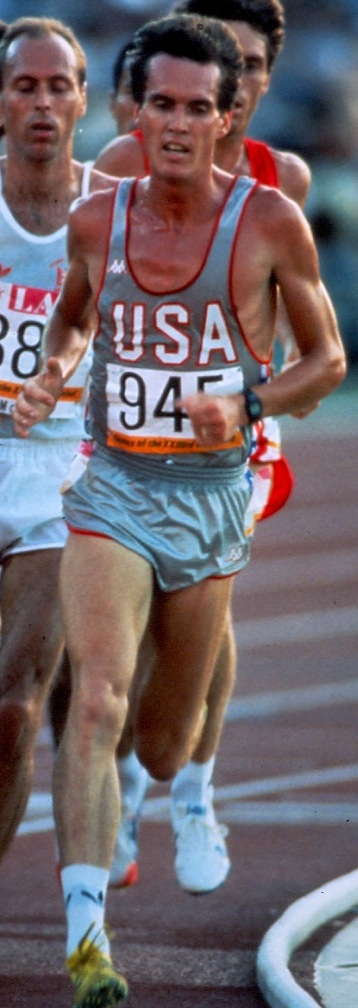
- Virgin at the 1984 Summer Olympics

Personal information
- Nationality: American
- Born: August 2, 1955 (age 71) Belleville, Illinois

Sport
- Sport: Cross country, track
- Events: 5000 meters, 10,000 meters
- College team: University of Illinois

Achievements and titles
- Personal bests: 3000 meters: 7:48.2 (1979); 2-mile: 8:22.0 (1979); 5000 meters: 13:19.1 (1980); 10,000 meters: 27:29.16 (1980); 5K run: 14:16 (1990); 10K run: 28:03 (1981); 15K run: 43:44 (1985); 10-mile run: 47:32 (1981); 20K run: 1:08:50 (1971); Half marathon: 1:02:31 (1980); Marathon: 2:10:26 (1981); 3000 meters indoor: 8:01.0 (1980)
Medal record
Men's athletics
Representing United States
World Cross Country Championships
Gold medal – first place	1980 Paris	Long Race
Gold medal – first place	1981 Madrid	Long Race
Silver medal – second place	1981 Madrid	Team Long Race
Silver medal – second place	1984 East Rutherford	Team Long Race
Bronze medal – third place	1985 Lisbon	Team Long Race
Bronze medal – third place	1986 Colombier	Team Long Race

Craig Steven Virgin (born August 2, 1955) is an American distance runner. He was born in Belleville, Illinois, and grew up near Lebanon, Illinois. While in high school, Virgin won 5 state championships (two in cross country and three in track) as well as setting the national outdoor high school 2-mile record of 8:40.9 (beating Steve Prefontaine's mark of 8:41.5, though slightly short of Gerry Lindgren's 8:40.0 indoor record from 1964). Additionally, Virgin held the Illinois Boys Cross Country all-time state championship record for 47 years, running a 13:50.6 in 1972, a record that stood until November 9, 2019, when Josh Methner of John Hersey High School ran a 13:49.86. Virgin was Track and Field News "High School Athlete of the Year" in 1973.

== Running career ==
While attending the University of Illinois, he won nine Big Ten Conference championships, nine All American awards as well as the 1975 NCAA Cross Country championship. He was a three-time Olympic qualifier at 10,000 meters, and the only American male to qualify three times in the event until Galen Rupp (2008, 2012, 2016). He was a seven-time American record holder in road and track events, including a 27:39.4 in the 10,000 meters in 1979 (breaking Prefontaine's American record) and a 27:29.16 in 1980 that was the second fastest 10,000 meters in history at the time.

Virgin enjoyed success in cross country, road racing, and track. He was the winner of the 1979 Falmouth Road Race in a course record 32:20, was the two-time winner (1980 & 1981) of the 12 km Bay to Breakers race in San Francisco, was a three-time winner of the 10K Peachtree Road Race (1979–1981) in Atlanta, and twice ran the fastest American 10 km road efforts (on point to point courses) with a 28:06 2nd place at the 1981 Crescent City Classic in New Orleans and later a 28:04 win at Peachtree that year. He enjoyed success in the few marathons he ran, his fastest time coming in a 2nd-place finish in the 1981 Boston Marathon (2:10:26). On the track he was a three-time national champion in the 10,000 meters at the U.S. National Track & Field Championships (1978, 1979, and 1982) and the winner of the 1980 Olympic Trials 10,000 meters. In cross country he was a nine-time member of the U.S. squad at the World Cross Country Championships. His biggest international accomplishment was being the first (and still the only) American man to win the IAAF World Cross Country Championships; which he did twice, in 1980 and 1981. He retired from competitive racing in 1992. In 2001, he was inducted into the National Distance Running Hall of Fame, and in 2011 inducted into the St. Louis Sports Hall of Fame. Also in 2011, he was inducted into the National USA Track & Field Hall of Fame, after being selected in 2010. Virgin deferred his induction for one year so he could be inducted at the USATF General Meeting that was held in St. Louis in 2011. Most recently in 2020, inducted into the National High School Track & Field Hall of Fame. During his professional career he ran for the Saint Louis Track Club.

Olympic success eluded Virgin. He was eliminated in the 10,000-metre heats at both the 1976 Montreal Summer Olympics and the 1984 Los Angeles Summer Olympics. In 1980, ten days before the Olympics began, he ran the second fastest 10,000 meter race in history, but due to the U.S. boycott was not allowed to participate in the games. He did receive one of 461 Congressional Gold Medals created especially for the spurned athletes.

== Competition record ==
=== Cross Country ===
Year	Competition	Venue	Position	Notes
Representing the United States
1978	World Cross-Country Championships	Glasgow, Scotland	6th	39:54
1979	World Cross-Country Championships	Limerick, Ireland	33rd	38:05
1980	USA Cross Country Trials	Eugene, Oregon	1st	36:43.7
1980	World Cross-Country Championships	Paris, France	1st	35:01
1981	USA Cross Country Trials	Louisville, Kentucky	1st	36:09.8
1981	World Cross-Country Championships	Madrid, Spain	1st	35:05
1982	USA Cross Country Trials	Pocatello, Idaho	3rd	37:09.0
1983	USA Cross Country Trials	Edwardsville, Illinois	2nd	36:50
1983	World Cross-Country Championships	Gateshead, UK	42nd	38:06
1984	USA Cross Country Trials	East Rutherford, New Jersey	3rd	35:18
1984	World Cross-Country Championships	East Rutherford NJ, US	17th	34:07
1985	USA Cross Country Trials	Waco, Texas	5th	37:03
1985	World Cross-Country Championships	Lisbon, Portugal	19th	34:12
1986	USA Cross Country Trials	Waco, Texas	5th	35:32.9
1986	World Cross-Country Championships	Colombier, Neuchâtel, Switzerland	81st	37:26
1988	USA Cross Country Trials	Dallas, Texas	6th	38:47
1988	World Cross-Country Championships	Auckland, New Zealand	102nd	37:40

=== Track and field - US Olympic Trials ===
Year	Competition	Venue	Position	Event	Notes
1976	US Olympic Trials	Eugene, Oregon	2nd	10,000 m	27:59.43
1980	US Olympic Trials	Eugene, Oregon	1st	10,000 m	27:45.61
1984	US Olympic Trials	Los Angeles, California	2nd	10,000 m	28:02.07

=== Marathon ===
Year	Competition	Venue	Position	Notes
1979	Mission Bay Marathon	San Diego, California	1st	2:14:40
1979	Fukuoka Marathon	Fukuoka, Japan	—	2:16:59
1981	Boston Marathon	Boston, United States	2nd	2:10:26
1982	Chicago Marathon	Chicago, Illinois	—	2:17:29

=== US National Championships ===
Year	Competition	Venue	Position	Event	Notes
1975	AAU Track and Field Championships	Eugene, Oregon	4th	5000 m	13:35.2
1978	AAU Track and Field Championships	Westwood, California	1st	10,000 m	28:15.0
1979	AAU Track and Field Championships	Walnut, California	1st	10,000 m	27:39.4
1980	AAU Track and Field Championships	Walnut, California	3rd	5000 m	13:35.65
1981	AAU Track and Field Championships	Sacramento, California	2nd	5000 m	13:31.64
1982	AAU Track and Field Championships	Knoxville, Tennessee	1st	10,000 m	28:33.02
1983	AAU Track and Field Championships	Indianapolis, Indiana	2nd	10,000 m	28:13.06

=== NCAA cross country ===
Year	Competition	Venue	Position	Notes
Representing University of Illinois
1973	NCAA Cross Country Championships	Pullman, Washington	10th	28:47.8
1974	NCAA Cross Country Championships	Bloomington, Indiana	12th	30:15.84
1975	NCAA Cross Country Championships	State College, Pennsylvania	1st	28:23.3
1976	NCAA Cross Country Championships	Denton, Texas	3rd	28:26.53

== Personal bests ==
Event	Time
5000 m	13:19.1
10,000 m	27:29
Marathon	2:10:26

== Post-athletic career ==
In 1992, Virgin was the Democratic candidate for a seat in the Illinois Senate against incumbent Republican Senator Frank Watson. Watson was victorious.

After the 2019 Chicago Public Schools Strike, Virgin came out against the Illinois High School Association's decision to bar runners from Chicago Public Schools from competing at the 2019 state championship.

== See also ==
- World Fit

Awards
Preceded by Craig Brigham	Track & Field News High School Boys Athlete of the Year; 1973	Succeeded by Willie Smith
