= Girma Berhanu =

Ethiopian cross-country runner

Girma Berhanu (born 19 July 1960) is a retired Ethiopian cross country runner.

== Achievements ==
Year	Competition	Venue	Position	Notes
1981	World Cross Country Championships	Madrid, Spain	7th	Long race
1981	World Cross Country Championships	Madrid, Spain	1st	Team competition
1985	World Cross Country Championships	Lisbon, Portugal	28th	Long race
1985	World Cross Country Championships	Lisbon, Portugal	1st	Team competition
