= 1981 IAAF World Cross Country Championships – Junior men's race =

Junior men's race at the 1981 IAAF World Cross Country Championships
- Organisers: IAAF
- Edition: 9th
- Date: March 28
- Host city: Madrid, Spain
- Venue: Hipodromo de la Zarzuela
- Events: 1
- Distances: 7.25 km – Junior men
- Participation: 104 athletes from 20 nations

The Junior men's race at the 1981 IAAF World Cross Country Championships was held in Madrid, Spain, at the Hipodromo de la Zarzuela on March 28, 1981. A report on the event was given in the Glasgow Herald.

Complete results, medallists, and the results of British athletes were published.

== Race results ==
=== Junior men's race (7.25 km) ===
==== Individual ====
Rank	Athlete	Country	Time
1st place, gold medalist(s)	Mohammed Chouri	Tunisia	22:04
2nd place, silver medalist(s)	Yevgeniy Zherebin	Soviet Union	22:06
3rd place, bronze medalist(s)	Keith Brantly	United States	22:07
4	George Nicholas	United States	22:08
5	Paul Davies-Hale	England	22:19
6	John Butler	United States	22:21
7	Vincent Rousseau	Belgium	22:23
8	Salvatore Antibo	Italy	22:29
9	Francesco Panetta	Italy	22:32
10	Chris Hamilton	United States	22:32
11	Jonathan Richards	England	22:33
12	Dave Reid	Canada	22:37
13	Henrique Crisostomo	Portugal	22:42
14	Chris Brewster	Canada	22:44
15	Steve Blakemore	Wales	22:45
16	Paul McCloy	Canada	22:50
17	Abel Antón	Spain	22:55
18	Paul Donovan	Ireland	22:56
19	Ole Hansen	Denmark	22:58
20	Mark King	England	22:59
21	Nikolay Chameyev	Soviet Union	23:01
22	Peter Warner	United States	23:01
23	Michael Pyeatt	United States	23:04
24	Allen Hugli	Canada	23:04
25	Christian Bloor	England	23:04
26	Cripiano Lucas	Portugal	23:07
27	Wim Willaert	Belgium	23:10
28	Stefano Mei	Italy	23:13
29	Hamid Zouhair	France	23:14
30	Zineddine Lamamra	Algeria	23:15
31	John Gladwin	Scotland	23:16
32	Brian O'Keefe	Ireland	23:18
33	Julius Benkö	Austria	23:18
34	Brian Roche	Ireland	23:19
35	Ranieri Carenza	Italy	23:21
36	Rui Saldanha	Portugal	23:21
37	Kim Taylor Hansen	Denmark	23:23
38	Juan Carlos Andres	Spain	23:25
39	Marc Olesen	Canada	23:25
40	August Sneyers	Belgium	23:28
41	Søren Munch	Denmark	23:30
42	Nicholas Boughey	Wales	23:30
43	Mohamed Ezzher	Morocco	23:31
44	Marc Maes	Belgium	23:31
45	Ernesto del Sarto	Italy	23:33
46	Juan Toledano	Spain	23:37
47	Enrico Ogliar Badessi	Italy	23:37
48	Nourredine Benzaoui	Algeria	23:37
49	Emmanuel Goulin	France	23:37
50	Viktor Kushch	Soviet Union	23:39
51	Philip Dixon	England	23:39
52	Jacques le Floch	France	23:39
53	Richard O'Flynn	Ireland	23:44
54	Hassan Sebtaoui	Morocco	23:45
55	Andrew Smith	Wales	23:48
56	Jacques Triquet	France	23:48
57	Dmitriy Ditlashok	Soviet Union	23:48
58	Remy Geoffroy	France	23:50
59	Marnix Goegebeur	Belgium	23:51
60	José Correira	Portugal	23:52
61	Nigel Stops	Wales	23:53
62	Mohamed Salah Rajhi	Tunisia	23:54
63	Mark Orzel	Canada	23:56
64	Pat McCarthy	Ireland	23:57
65	Tayeb Mohammed Djitli	Algeria	24:01
66	Ahmed Dribi	Morocco	24:02
67	Javier Nieto	Spain	24:02
68	Adelino Hidalgo	Spain	24:02
69	Khemissi Salhi	Algeria	24:04
70	Hans Gebroers	Belgium	24:06
71	Brahim Boudina	Algeria	24:07
72	Ray Murtagh	Northern Ireland	24:07
73	Martin Flynn	Ireland	24:07
74	Callan Henderson	Scotland	24:11
75	Aissa Remel	Algeria	24:13
76	Hamid Karoui	Morocco	24:15
77	Alfred Ungersböck	Austria	24:15
78	Ian Steel	Scotland	24:21
79	Peter Gylling	Denmark	24:21
80	Rolf Lauper	Switzerland	24:21
81	Manuel Matias	Portugal	24:27
82	Steve Smith	Wales	24:27
83	Mohamed Hammami	Tunisia	24:27
84	Colin McIntyre	Scotland	24:27
85	Mohamed Sabwane	Morocco	24:28
86	Deon McNeilly	Northern Ireland	24:29
87	Andreas Ceconi	Austria	24:30
88	Neil Rimmer	England	24:30
89	Tommy Wright	Northern Ireland	24:53
90	Abdelkader Belhaied	Tunisia	24:57
91	Renat Kuenzi	Switzerland	25:01
92	Josef Scharmer	Austria	25:12
93	Paul McCaffrey	Northern Ireland	25:13
94	Ali Dhfair	Saudi Arabia	25:34
95	Saif Al-Shahrani	Saudi Arabia	25:53
96	Gordon McMillan	Scotland	25:59
97	Francisco Espejo	Spain	26:10
98	Ali Obedi	Saudi Arabia	26:25
99	Khalid Marzouk	Saudi Arabia	26:59
100	Abdurrahman Al-Eid	Saudi Arabia	27:09
101	Samer Al-Dhanem	Saudi Arabia	27:46
102	Grigoriy Mishuniy	Soviet Union	28:00
—	Ernesto Monteiro	Portugal	DNF
—	Peter Schwarzenpoller	Austria	DNF

==== Teams ====
Rank	Team	Points
1st place, gold medalist(s)	United States: Keith Brantly / 3; George Nicholas / 4; John Butler / 6; Chris Hamilton / 10; (Peter Warner) / (22); (Michael Pyeatt) / (23)	23
2nd place, silver medalist(s)	England: Paul Davies-Hale / 5; Jonathan Richards / 11; Mark King / 20; Christian Bloor / 25; (Philip Dixon) / (51); (Neil Rimmer) / (88)	61
3rd place, bronze medalist(s)	Canada: Dave Reid / 12; Chris Brewster / 14; Paul McCloy / 16; Allen Hugli / 24; (Marc Olesen) / (39); (Mark Orzel) / (63)	66
4	Italy: Salvatore Antibo / 8; Francesco Panetta / 9; Stefano Mei / 28; Ranieri Carenza / 35; (Ernesto del Sarto) / (45); (Enrico Ogliar Badessi) / (47)	80
5	Belgium: Vincent Rousseau / 7; Wim Willaert / 27; August Sneyers / 40; Marc Maes / 44; (Marnix Goegebeur) / (59); (Hans Gebroers) / (70)	118
6	Soviet Union: Yevgeniy Zherebin / 2; Nikolay Chameyev / 21; Viktor Kushch / 50; Dmitriy Ditlashok / 57; (Grigoriy Mishuniy) / (102)	130
7	Portugal: Henrique Crisostomo / 13; Cripiano Lucas / 26; Rui Saldanha / 36; José Correira / 60; (Manuel Matias) / (81); (Ernesto Monteiro) / (DNF)	135
8	Ireland: Paul Donovan / 18; Brian O'Keefe / 32; Brian Roche / 34; Richard O'Flynn / 53; (Pat McCarthy) / (64); (Martin Flynn) / (73)	137
9	Spain: Abel Antón / 17; Juan Carlos Andres / 38; Juan Toledano / 46; Javier Nieto / 67; (Adelino Hidalgo) / (68); (Francisco Espejo) / (97)	168
10	Wales: Steve Blakemore / 15; Nicholas Boughey / 42; Andrew Smith / 55; Nigel Stops / 61; (Steve Smith) / (82)	173
11	Denmark: Ole Hansen / 19; Kim Taylor Hansen / 37; Søren Munch / 41; Peter Gylling / 79	176
12	France: Hamid Zouhair / 29; Emmanuel Goulin / 49; Jacques le Floch / 52; Jacques Triquet / 56; (Remy Geoffroy) / (58)	186
13	Algeria: Zineddine Lamamra / 30; Nourredine Benzaoui / 48; Tayeb Mohammed Djitli / 65; Khemissi Salhi / 69; (Brahim Boudina) / (71); (Aissa Remel) / (75)	212
14	Tunisia: Mohammed Chouri / 1; Mohamed Salah Rajhi / 62; Mohamed Hammami / 83; Abdelkader Belhaied / 90	236
15	Morocco: Mohamed Ezzher / 43; Hassan Sebtaoui / 54; Ahmed Dribi / 66; Hamid Karoui / 76; (Mohamed Sabwane) / (85)	239
16	Scotland: John Gladwin / 31; Callan Henderson / 74; Ian Steel / 78; Colin McIntyre / 84; (Gordon McMillan) / (96)	267
17	Austria: Julius Benkö / 33; Alfred Ungersböck / 77; Andreas Ceconi / 87; Josef Scharmer / 92; (Peter Schwarzenpoller) / (DNF)	289
18	Northern Ireland: Ray Murtagh / 72; Deon McNeilly / 86; Tommy Wright / 89; Paul McCaffrey / 93	340
19	Saudi Arabia: Ali Dhfair / 94; Saif Al-Shahrani / 95; Ali Obedi / 98; Khalid Marzouk / 99; (Abdurrahman Al-Eid) / (100); (Samer Al-Dhanem) / (101)	386

- Note: Athletes in parentheses did not score for the team result

== Participation ==
An unofficial count yields the participation of 104 athletes from 20 countries in the Junior men's race. This is in agreement with the official numbers as published.

- Algeria (6)
- Austria (5)
- Belgium (6)
- Canada (6)
- Denmark (4)
- England (6)
- France (5)
- Ireland (6)
- Italy (6)
- Morocco (5)
- Northern Ireland (4)
- Portugal (6)
- Saudi Arabia (6)
- Scotland (5)
- Soviet Union (5)
- Spain (6)
- Switzerland (2)
- Tunisia (4)
- United States (6)
- Wales (5)

== See also ==
- 1981 IAAF World Cross Country Championships – Senior men's race
- 1981 IAAF World Cross Country Championships – Senior women's race
