= Alba Milana =

Italian long-distance runner

Personal information
- Nationality: Italian
- Born: 17 March 1959 (age 67) Olevano Romano, Rome

Sport
- Country: Italy
- Sport: Athletics
- Event: Long-distance running
Medal record
World Cross Country Championships
Bronze medal – third place	1981 Madrid	Team

Alba Milana (born 17 March 1959) is a retired female long-distance runner from Italy.

== Biography ==
She competed for her native country at the 1984 Summer Olympics in Los Angeles, California. There she ended up in 12th place in the women's marathon.

Milana set her personal best in the marathon in 1983 when her time of 2:32.57 brought her victory in the Rome City Marathon, which was also doubling as the national championships that year.

== Achievements ==
- All results regarding marathon, unless stated otherwise

Year	Competition	Venue	Position	Notes
Representing Italy
1982	European Championships	Athens, Greece	4th	2:38:54
1983	Rome City Marathon	Rome, Italy	1st	2:32:57
1983	World Championships	Helsinki, Finland	—	DNF
1984	Olympic Games	Los Angeles, United States	12th	2:33:01

== National titles ==
- Italian Mountain Running Championships
  - Mountain running: 1983
