= 1980 IAAF World Cross Country Championships – Junior men's race =

Junior men's race at the 1980 IAAF World Cross Country Championships
- Organisers: IAAF
- Edition: 8th
- Date: March 9
- Host city: Paris, France
- Venue: Hippodrome de Longchamp
- Events: 1
- Distances: 7.41 km – Junior men
- Participation: 97 athletes from 18 nations

The Junior men's race at the 1980 IAAF World Cross Country Championships was held in Paris, France, at the Hippodrome de Longchamp on March 9, 1980. A report on the event was given in the Evening Times.

Complete results, medallists, and the results of British athletes were published.

== Race results ==
=== Junior men's race (7.41 km) ===
==== Individual ====
Rank	Athlete	Country	Time
1st place, gold medalist(s)	Jordi García	Spain	22:17
2nd place, silver medalist(s)	Valeriy Gryaznov	Soviet Union	22:23
3rd place, bronze medalist(s)	Ed Eyestone	United States	22:27
4	Denis Stark	Canada	22:34
5	Tom Downs	United States	22:34
6	Sergey Kiselyov	Soviet Union	22:36
7	Ildar Denikeyev	Soviet Union	22:38
8	Guy Léfèvre	Belgium	22:41
9	Andrea Prassedi	Italy	22:47
10	Paul Davies-Hale	England	22:52
11	William Graham	United States	22:53
12	Gary Huckwell	England	22:58
13	Brian O'Keefe	Ireland	22:58
14	Johan van Oost	Belgium	22:59
15	Ross Chilton	Canada	23:00
16	Gábor Szabó	Hungary	23:04
17	Brahim Boudina	Algeria	23:05
18	Henrik Jørgensen	Denmark	23:08
19	Steve Blakemore	Wales	23:10
20	José Fernández	Spain	23:10
21	Enrico Ogliar Badessi	Italy	23:11
22	Lars-Erik Nilsson	Sweden	23:12
23	Gyula Balogh	Hungary	23:13
24	Miguel Rubio	Spain	23:13
25	Philip Ledger	England	23:14
26	Faisal Touzri	Tunisia	23:18
27	Laurent Brosseau	France	23:18
28	Rabah Aboura	Algeria	23:19
29	Hichem Oueslati	Tunisia	23:19
30	Mauro Perna	Italy	23:21
31	William Van Dijck	Belgium	23:23
32	Ted Murphy	Canada	23:23
33	Jen Emmanuel Lassoie	Belgium	23:26
34	Julio Perez	Spain	23:26
35	Sergey Mishin	Soviet Union	23:26
36	Jean-Luc Taif	France	23:27
37	Yvan Perre	France	23:27
38	István Bene	Hungary	23:28
39	Carrey Penner	Canada	23:29
40	Kai Röcker	West Germany	23:29
41	Salvatore Bettiol	Italy	23:31
42	Paul Cowell	England	23:33
43	Dave Reid	Canada	23:34
44	Eddy Stevens	Belgium	23:39
45	Djamel Eddine Galli	Algeria	23:40
46	Sid-Ali Sakhri	Algeria	23:41
47	Adrian Callan	Scotland	23:42
48	John McCreedy	Northern Ireland	23:44
49	Terry Conlon	Ireland	23:46
50	Dominique Grandjean	France	23:47
51	Pedro Garin	Spain	23:49
52	Dmitriy Ditlashok	Soviet Union	23:50
53	Mohammed Chouri	Tunisia	23:51
54	Carlo Grasso	Italy	23:52
55	Martin Grosskopf	West Germany	23:53
56	Eric Sappenfield	United States	23:53
57	Peter Elliott	England	23:54
58	Luc Sadones	Belgium	23:55
59	Philip Llewellyn	Wales	23:58
60	Sören Egge Rasmussen	Denmark	23:58
61	Francisco Erneta	Spain	24:00
62	Mohamed Hadj Gasmi	Tunisia	24:03
63	Hocine Guessas	Algeria	24:05
64	Gerhard Lindner	West Germany	24:08
65	Ross Copestake	Scotland	24:10
66	Tom Breen	Northern Ireland	24:10
67	Simon Axon	Wales	24:11
68	Abderrahmane Boumouzia	Algeria	24:12
69	John Gladwin	Scotland	24:18
70	Ralf Winter	West Germany	24:19
71	Jacques Triquet	France	24:20
72	Nigel Barton	Northern Ireland	24:20
73	Kim Taylor Hansen	Denmark	24:21
74	Ross Arbuckle	Scotland	24:22
75	Marcus O'Sullivan	Ireland	24:24
76	Jacques le Floch	France	24:28
77	László Szász	Hungary	24:31
78	Gary Millar	Scotland	24:32
79	Andrew Smith	Wales	24:33
80	Said Shili	Tunisia	24:33
81	Ole Hansen	Denmark	24:34
82	Daniel Caprioglio	United States	24:34
83	Brian Roche	Ireland	24:43
84	Coleman Connelly	Ireland	24:47
85	Peter Fox	Scotland	24:49
86	Nigel Stops	Wales	24:52
87	Jamel Zriba	Tunisia	24:58
88	Farron Fields	United States	25:03
89	Peter Gylling	Denmark	25:10
90	Martin Coupland	Northern Ireland	25:16
91	Tom Melville	Northern Ireland	25:19
92	Jörg Thoma	West Germany	25:24
93	Peter Williams	Wales	25:36
94	David Lynch	Ireland	26:00
—	John Doherty	Northern Ireland	DNF
—	Dave Lewis	England	DNF
—	Luciano Carchesio	Italy	DNF

==== Teams ====
Rank	Team	Points
1st place, gold medalist(s)	Soviet Union: Valeriy Gryaznov / 2; Sergey Kiselyov / 6; Ildar Denikeyev / 7; Sergey Mishin / 35; (Dmitriy Ditlashok) / (52)	50
2nd place, silver medalist(s)	United States: Ed Eyestone / 3; Tom Downs / 5; William Graham / 11; Eric Sappenfield / 56; (Daniel Caprioglio) / (82); (Farron Fields) / (88)	75
3rd place, bronze medalist(s)	Spain: Jordi García / 1; José Fernández / 20; Miguel Rubio / 24; Julio Perez / 34; (Pedro Garin) / (51); (Francisco Erneta) / (61)	79
4	Belgium: Guy Léfèvre / 8; Johan van Oost / 14; William Van Dijck / 31; Jen Emmanuel Lassoie / 33; (Eddy Stevens) / (44); (Luc Sadones) / (58)	86
5	England: Paul Davies-Hale / 10; Gary Huckwell / 12; Philip Ledger / 25; Paul Cowell / 42; (Peter Elliott) / (57); (Dave Lewis) / (DNF)	89
6	Canada: Denis Stark / 4; Ross Chilton / 15; Ted Murphy / 32; Carrey Penner / 39; (Dave Reid) / (43)	90
7	Italy: Andrea Prassedi / 9; Enrico Ogliar Badessi / 21; Mauro Perna / 30; Salvatore Bettiol / 41; (Carlo Grasso) / (54); (Luciano Carchesio) / (DNF)	101
8	Algeria: Brahim Boudina / 17; Rabah Aboura / 28; Djamel Eddine Galli / 45; Sid-Ali Sakhri / 46; (Hocine Guessas) / (63); (Abderrahmane Boumouzia) / (68)	136
9	France: Laurent Brosseau / 27; Jean-Luc Taif / 36; Yvan Perre / 37; Dominique Grandjean / 50; (Jacques Triquet) / (71); (Jacques le Floch) / (76)	150
10	Hungary: Gábor Szabó / 16; Gyula Balogh / 23; István Bene / 38; László Szász / 77	154
11	Tunisia: Faisal Touzri / 26; Hichem Oueslati / 29; Mohammed Chouri / 53; Mohamed Hadj Gasmi / 62; (Said Shili) / (80); (Jamel Zriba) / (87)	170
12	Ireland: Brian O'Keefe / 13; Terry Conlon / 49; Marcus O'Sullivan / 75; Brian Roche / 83; (Coleman Connelly) / (84); (David Lynch) / (94)	220
13	Wales: Steve Blakemore / 19; Philip Llewellyn / 59; Simon Axon / 67; Andrew Smith / 79; (Nigel Stops) / (86); (Peter Williams) / (93)	224
14	West Germany: Kai Röcker / 40; Martin Grosskopf / 55; Gerhard Lindner / 64; Ralf Winter / 70; (Jörg Thoma) / (92)	229
15	Denmark: Henrik Jørgensen / 18; Sören Egge Rasmussen / 60; Kim Taylor Hansen / 73; Ole Hansen / 81; (Peter Gylling) / (89)	232
16	Scotland: Adrian Callan / 47; Ross Copestake / 65; John Gladwin / 69; Ross Arbuckle / 74; (Gary Millar) / (78); (Peter Fox) / (85)	255
17	Northern Ireland: John McCreedy / 48; Tom Breen / 66; Nigel Barton / 72; Martin Coupland / 90; (Tom Melville) / (91); (John Doherty) / (DNF)	276

- Note: Athletes in parentheses did not score for the team result

== Participation ==
An unofficial count yields the participation of 97 athletes from 18 countries in the Junior men's race. This is in agreement with the official numbers as published.

- Algeria (6)
- Belgium (6)
- Canada (5)
- Denmark (5)
- England (6)
- France (6)
- Hungary (4)
- Ireland (6)
- Italy (6)
- Northern Ireland (6)
- Scotland (6)
- Soviet Union (5)
- Spain (6)
- Sweden (1)
- Tunisia (6)
- United States (6)
- Wales (6)
- West Germany (5)

== See also ==
- 1980 IAAF World Cross Country Championships – Senior men's race
- 1980 IAAF World Cross Country Championships – Senior women's race
