= Hilde Stavik =

Norwegian long-distance runner

Hilde Stavik (6 September 1962 – 8 April 2015) was a Norwegian long-distance runner.

In track championships, she competed on four occasions, rising on each occasion from the 800 metres via 1500 and 3000 metres to the 5000 metres. She did not reach the final in any of the races; the 1979 European Junior Championships, the 1994 European Championships (1500 m), the 1994 European Championships (3000 m) or the 1995 World Championships.

Her greatest success came in road races. After a 109th place at the 1981 World Cross Country Championships, she finished 26th at the 1992 World Half Marathon Championships—and eighth in the team competition. Then came her career highlight as she finished sixth at the 1994 World Half Marathon Championships—and won the silver medal in the team competition.

Stavik became Norwegian 1500 metres champion in 1982, 1992, 1993, 1994 and 1995; won the bronze in 1991 and silver in 1996. She became the 5000 metres champion in 1992, 1993, 1994 and 1995, and won the silver in 1996. Her personal best times were 2:04.7 minutes in the 800 metres (1982); 4:10.51 minutes in the 1500 metres (1992); 4:34.39 minutes in the mile run (1994); 8:47.47 minutes in the 3000 metres (1994); 15:22.77 minutes in the 5000 metres (1996); 1:10:21 hours in the half marathon (1994) and 2:59:55 hours in the marathon (1990).

Stavik hailed from Kolvereid and originally represented Kolvereid IL, later Steinkjer I&FK and Aksla IL in Ålesund. She later represented SK Vidar in Oslo, winning the Holmenkollstafetten road relay in 1987 which marked the start of the club's heyday in women's long-distance running. She died from cancer in 2015.
