= Paul Davies-Hale =

English long-distance runner

Personal information
- Nationality: British (English)
- Born: 21 June 1962 (age 64) Nuneaton, Warwickshire, England
- Height: 176 cm (5 ft 9 in)
- Weight: 60 kg (132 lb)

Sport
- Sport: Athletics
- Event: steeplechase / marathon
- Club: Cannock Chase & Stafford

Paul Davies-Hale (born 21 June 1962) is an English former long-distance runner. He won the 2000 metres steeplechase at the 1981 European Junior Championships and went on to represent Great Britain at the 1984 Los Angeles Olympics and the 1992 Barcelona Olympics.

== Biography ==
Davies-Hale was a promising junior cross-country runner from Rugeley, Staffordshire. He progressed to the track and represented England in the 3000 metres steeplechase event, at the 1982 Commonwealth Games in Brisbane, Australia.

He finished second behind Spaniard Domingo Ramón in the steeplechase event at the 1984 AAA Championships but by virtue of being the highest placed British athlete was considered the British 3000 metres steeplechase champion. Shortly afterwards he represented Great Britain at the 1984 Los Angeles Olympics running the 3000m steeplechase.

In 1985 he moved to Boulder, Colorado to train. He moved up to the longer distances of Half Marathon and eventually the Marathon. He won the 1989 Chicago Marathon, his first ever marathon, which was a hot and humid race. In the race he overtook compatriot David Long and beat Russian Ravil Kashapov by two minutes. In 1991, he finished second in the Great North Run just seven seconds behind the Kenyan Benson Masya.

Eight years after his first appearance at the Summer Olympics, he competed again at the 1992 Barcelona Olympics in the Marathon. He finished 41st behind both British runners David Long, 39th, and Steve Brace, 27th.

Davies-Hale has organised several running events including the 'Action Heart race', 'Baggeridge 5K', 'Suicide Six' and 'Sheepwalks Shocker'.

== International competitions ==
Year	Competition	Venue	Position	Event	Notes
Representing Great Britain / England
1980	IAAF World Cross Country Championships	Paris, France	10th	Junior race	22:52
1981	IAAF World Cross Country Championships	Madrid, Spain	5th	Junior race	22:19
1981	European Junior Championships	Utrecht, Netherlands	1st	2000m steeplechase	5:31.12
1984	Olympic Games	Los Angeles, United States	Semi-final	3000m Steeplechase	8:26.15
1992	Olympic Games	Barcelona, Spain	41st	Marathon	2:21:15

== Other Races ==
Year	Competition	Venue	Position	Event	Notes
1985	Bolder Boulder	Boulder, Colorado	1st	10 km	29:04
1985	Lilac Bloomsday Run	Spokane, Washington	1st	12 km	34:27
1986	The Morpeth	Morpeth, Northumberland	1st	22.7 km	1:07:02
1986	Reading Half Marathon	Reading, Berkshire	1st	Half Marathon	1:02:39
1988	The Morpeth	Morpeth, Northumberland	1st	22.7 km	1:08:33
1989	Chicago Marathon	Chicago	1st	Marathon	2:11:25 (PB)
1989	Hastings Half Marathon	Hastings, East Sussex	1st	Half Marathon	1:02:09
1990	Hastings Half Marathon	Hastings, East Sussex	1st	Half Marathon	1:03:11
1991	The Morpeth	Morpeth, Northumberland	1st	22.7 km	1:12:27
1991	Great North Run	Newcastle	2nd	Half Marathon	1:01:39 (PB)
1992	Great West Run	Exeter	1st	Half Marathon	1:04:15
1993	London Marathon	London	31st	Marathon	2:19:35
1994	Berlin Marathon	Berlin	20th	Marathon	2:16:48
