= Luciana Saccol =

Italian middle-distance runner

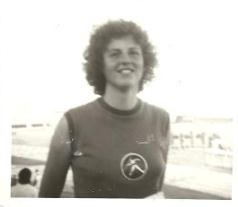

Personal information
- National team: Italy (2 caps 1980)
- Born: 23 January 1956 (age 70) Pieve di Soligo, Treviso, Italy

Sport
- Country: Italy
- Sport: Athletics
- Events: Middle-distance running; Cross country running
- Club: Libertas Treviso

Achievements and titles
- Personal best: 800 m: 2:07.80 (1980)

Luciana Saccol (born 23 January 1956) is a former Italian female middle-distance runner and cross-country runner who competed at individual senior level at the World Athletics Cross Country Championships (1980).
