= Penny Forse =

British athlete (born 1949)

Penny Forse née Yule
Personal information
- Nationality: British (English)
- Born: 7 June 1949 (age 76) Chichester, England
- Height: 169 cm (5 ft 7 in)
- Weight: 54 kg (119 lb)

Sport
- Sport: Athletics
- Event: Middle-distance running
- Club: Portsmouth Atalanta AC

Penelope Ann Forse, née Yule (born 7 June 1949) is a female retired British middle-distance runner who competed at the 1976 Summer Olympics.

== Biography ==
At the 1976 Olympics Games in Montreal, Yule represented Great Britain in the women's 1500 metres. The following month Yule became the British 1500 metres champion after winning the British WAAA Championships title at the 1976 WAAA Championships and successfully retained the title at the title at the 1977 WAAA Championships.

She finished seventh at the 1980 World Cross Country Championships, also winning a silver medal in the team competition.

She represented England in the 3,000 metres event, at the 1978 Commonwealth Games in Edmonton, Alberta, Canada.

Yule married Alan Forse in late 1979 and competed under her married name thereafter.
