= Novyye Balykly =

Novyye Balykly Новые Балыклы
- Selo
- Location within Bashkortostan Location within Russia
- Coordinates: 55°07′N 53°46′E
- Country: Russia
- Region: Bashkortostan
- District: Bakalinsky District
- Time zone: UTC+5:00

Novyye Balykly (Russian: Новые Балыклы; Bashkir: Яңы Балыҡлы, Yañı Balıqlı) is a rural locality (a selo) in Bakalinsky Selsoviet, Bakalinsky District, Bashkortostan, Russia. The population was 493 as of 2010. There are 3 streets.

== Geography ==
Novyye Balykly is located 8 km southwest of Bakaly (the district's administrative centre) by road. Starye Balykly is the nearest rural locality.
