= Marina Loddo =

Italian long-distance runner

Personal information
- National team: Italy (4 caps 1977-1981)
- Born: 21 December 1959 (age 66) Varese, Italy

Sport
- Country: Italy
- Sport: Athletics
- Events: Middle-distance running; Cross country running

Achievements and titles
- Personal best: 1500 m: 4:19.3 (1977)
Medal record
World Cross Country Championships
Silver medal – second place	1974 Monza	Team

Marina Loddo (born 21 December 1959) is a former Italian female middle-distance runner and cross-country runner who competed at individual senior level at the World Athletics Cross Country Championships (1977, 1981).
