= Zehava Shmueli =

Israeli long-distance runner

Zehava Shmueli (Hebrew: זהבה שמואלי; born May 19, 1955) is a retired long-distance runner from Israel. She competed for her native country at the 1984 Summer Olympics in Los Angeles, California. There she ended up in 30th place out of 50 competitors in the women's marathon. Shmueli set her personal best in the classic distance (2:40.29) in 1983.

== Achievements ==
Year	Competition	Venue	Position	Notes
Representing Israel
1983	World Championships	Helsinki, Finland	36th	Marathon
1984	Olympic Games	Los Angeles, United States	30th	Marathon
