= Yelena Sipatova =

Soviet long-distance runner

Personal information
- Born: 7 June 1955 (age 71)

Sport
- Sport: Track and field
Medal record
Representing Soviet Union
World Cross Country Championships
Bronze medal – third place	1980 Paris	Senior race
Bronze medal – third place	1981 Madrid	Senior race
European Championships
Bronze medal – third place	1982 Athens	3000 m
European Indoor Championships
Gold medal – first place	1983 Budapest	3000 m

Yelena Sipatova (Russian: Елена Сипатова; born 7 June 1955) is a retired long-distance runner from the Soviet Union, and a former winner of the Rome City Marathon (1995) and the Istanbul Marathon (1993).

== Career ==
She was the first IAAF-recognised women's world record holder in the 10,000 metres with her time of 32:17.20 minutes. She also set an unrecognised world best in the 5000 metres, with 15:24.6 minutes in 1981.

Her first successes came under her maiden name, Yelena Chernysheva (also transliterated Elena Chernyshova), and she was the individual bronze medallist and team gold medallist at the 1980 IAAF World Cross Country Championships. She repeated that same feat at the 1981 event and won a third and final team title at the 1982 edition (leading the Soviet women in seventh).

On the track she competed in the 3000 metres. She won a silver outdoors at the 1981 European Cup, then won a bronze medal at the 1982 European Athletics Championships. She was a gold medallist at the 1983 European Athletics Indoor Championships.

== International competitions ==
Year	Competition	Venue	Position	Event	Notes
Representing Soviet Union
1980	World Cross Country Championships	Paris, France	3rd	Senior race	15:52
1980	World Cross Country Championships	Paris, France	1st	Senior team	15 pts
1981	World Cross Country Championships	Madrid, Spain	3rd	Senior race	14:22
1981	World Cross Country Championships	Madrid, Spain	1st	Senior team	24 pts
1981	European Cup	Zagreb, Yugoslavia	2nd	3000 m	8:49.99
1982	World Cross Country Championships	Rome, Italy	7th	Senior race	14:51.9
1982	World Cross Country Championships	Rome, Italy	1st	Team	44 pts
1982	European Championships	Athens, Greece	3rd	3000 m	8:34.06
1983	European Indoor Championships	Budapest, Hungary	1st	3000 m	9:04.40
1983	World Cross Country Championships	Gateshead, England	21st	Senior race	14:21
1983	World Cross Country Championships	Gateshead, England	2nd	Team	41 pts
1986	World Cross Country Championships	Colombier, Switzerland	49th	Senior race	15:54.9
1986	World Cross Country Championships	Colombier, Switzerland	7th	Senior team	140 pts

== Circuit wins ==
- Rome City Marathon: 1995 (2:32:57)
- Lille Marathon 1995 (2:36:21)

Records
Preceded by None	Women's 10,000 metres world record holder 19 October 1981 – 16 July 1982	Succeeded by Mary Decker
Sporting positions
Preceded by Grete Waitz	Women's 3000 m Best Year Performance; 1980	Succeeded by Maricica Puică
