= Kathryn Binns =

British long-distance runner

Personal information
- Nationality: British (English)
- Born: 13 January 1958 (age 67) Halifax, West Yorkshire, England

Sport
- Sport: Athletics
- Event: middle distance
- Club: Sale Harriers

Kathryn Mary Binns married name Dickinson (born 13 January 1958) is a female retiredlong-distance runner from England. She competed in the late 1970s and early 1980s in cross-country and distance races including the marathon and half marathon.

== Biography ==
Binns finished second behind Deirdre Nagle in the 3000 metres event at the 1979 WAAA Championships. The following year, Binns finished ninth at the 1980 World Cross Country Championships, also winning a silver medal in the team competition.

Binns became both the British 5000 metres champion and the British 10,000 metres champion after winning the British WAAA Championships titles at the 1981 WAAA Championships. Binns then became the British marathon champion at the 1982 WAAA Championships.

In 1982, Binns also set her personal best (2:36:12) in the classic distance on 12 June in Windsor, Berkshire, defeating runner-up Carol Gould.

== Achievements ==
| Year | Competition | Venue | Position | Event | Notes |
|---|---|---|---|---|---|
| 1979 | English National Cross-Country | Runcorn | 1st | Senior race | |
Representing Great Britain
| 1982 | European Championships | Athens, Greece | 9th | Marathon | 2:44:09 |
| 1983 | World Championships | Helsinki, Finland | 22nd | Marathon | 2:42:12 |
