= Jorge García (athlete) =

Spanish long-distance runner

Personal information
- Born: 2 May 1961 (age 65) Barcelona, Spain

Sport
- Sport: Long-distance running
- Event: 5000 metres

Jorge García (born 2 May 1961) is a Spanish long-distance runner. He competed in the men's 5000 metres at the 1984 Summer Olympics.
