= Svetlana Ulmasova =

Soviet long-distance runner

Personal information
- Born: 4 February 1953 Novyye Balykly, Sovet Union
- Died: 6 April 2009 (aged 56)

Sport
- Sport: Track and field
Medal record
Representing Soviet Union
European Championships
Gold medal – first place	1978 Prague	3000 m
Gold medal – first place	1982 Athens	3000 m
Summer Universiade
Bronze medal – third place	1975 Rome	3000 m

Svetlana Ulmasova (Russian: Светпана Упьмасова; 4 February 1953 – 6 April 2009) was a long-distance runner from the Soviet Union and a former world record holder in the women's 3000 metres (outdoor). She was the 1979 World Cup 3,000 metre champion. She set the world record of 8:27.68 on 25 July 1982. She was a 2 time European Champion over 3,000 metres in 1978 and 1982. As well as a 5-time team medalist at the World Cross Country Championships, twice winning the gold.

Her results on 3000 and 5000 metres are still the current Uzbek records.

== Achievements ==
Year	Competition	Venue	Position	Notes
Representing Soviet Union
1978	European Championships	Prague, Czechoslovakia	1st	3000 m
1979	World Cross Country Championships	Limerick, Ireland	2nd	Team Competition
1980	World Cross Country Championships	Paris, France	1st	Team Competition
1981	World Cross Country Championships	Madrid, Spain	1st	Team Competition
1982	European Championships	Athens, Greece	1st	3000 m
1983	World Cross Country Championships	Gateshead, England	2nd	Team Competition

Records
Preceded by (Soviet Union) Lyudmila Bragina	Women's 3000 m World Record Holder; 25 July 1982 — 26 August 1984	Succeeded by (Soviet Union) Tatyana Kazankina
Sporting positions
Preceded by (Romania) Maricica Puică	Women's 3000 m Best Year Performance; 1982	Succeeded by (Soviet Union) Tatyana Kazankina
