= Dorthe Rasmussen =

Danish long-distance runner (born 1960)

Dorthe Skovshoved Rasmussen (born 27 January 1960) is a retired female long-distance runner from Denmark. She competed for her native country at two Summer Olympics: 1984 and 1992. Her best result was finishing in 13th place in the women's marathon at the 1984 Summer Olympics. She set her personal best in the classic distance (2:29.34) in 1989.

== Achievements ==
Year	Competition	Venue	Position	Event	Notes
Representing Denmark
1984	Olympic Games	Los Angeles, United States	13th	Marathon	2:33:40
1986	European Championships	Stuttgart, West Germany	18th	10,000 m	32:53.04
1989	Egmond Half Marathon	Egmond, Netherlands	1st	Half Marathon	1:14:45
1991	World Championships	Tokyo, Japan	—	Marathon	DNF
1992	Olympic Games	Barcelona, Spain	heats	10,000 m	33:22.43
1995	World Championships	Gothenburg, Sweden	—	Marathon	DNF
