= Jan Merrill =

American long-distance runner

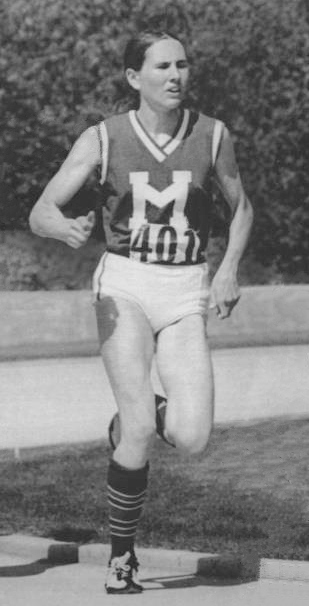
- Merrill in 1975

Personal information
- Born: June 18, 1956 (age 70) New London, Connecticut
- Education: Waterford Highschool, CT
- Height: 165 cm (5 ft 5 in)
- Weight: 52 kg (115 lb)

Sport
- Sport: Athletics
- Event: 800–10,000 m
- Club: Connecticut College; Age Group Athletes Association
- Coached by: Norm Higgins

Achievements and titles
- Personal best(s): 800 m – 2:02.80 (1977); 1500 m – 4:02.61 (1976); Mile – 4:28.3 (1979); 3000 m – 8:42.6 (1978); 5000 m – 15:30.6 (1980); 10,000 m – 32.03. (1981)
Medal record
Representing the United States
Pan American Games
Gold medal – first place	1975 Mexico City	1500 m
Gold medal – first place	1979 San Juan	3000 m

Janice "Jan" Melbourne Merrill (born June 18, 1956) is a retired American runner. She was the dominant long-distance runner of the middle 1970s, a notable front runner, her uniform with the large "M" on her chest would usually break away to an insurmountable lead in domestic meets. She was equally untouchable in self-promotion or dealing with the media, often deferring to her coach, Norm Higgins. At various points in time she held the American record in the 1500 meters (4:02.61 set on July 29, 1976) during the 1976 Summer Olympics in Montreal, the 3,000 meters and 5,000 meters. She lost other record opportunities because the only times she could get a decent race in the United States was against men.

She won the U.S. title at 1500 meters twice outdoors, 3000 meters 4 times, twice in the indoor mile, twice in the indoor 2 mile and twice in Cross Country. After retiring from competitions she became a high school and college track coach.

== Achievements ==
Year	Tournament	Venue	Result	Extra
Representing the United States
1976	Olympic Games	Montreal, Canada	8th	1500 m
1978	World Cross Country Championships	Glasgow, Scotland	7th	Long Race Individual
1978	World Cross Country Championships	Glasgow, Scotland	2nd	Long Race Team
1979	World Cross Country Championships	Limerick, Ireland	7th	Long Race Individual
1979	World Cross Country Championships	Limerick, Ireland	1st	Long Race Team
1980	World Cross Country Championships	Paris, France	5th	Long Race Individual
1980	World Cross Country Championships	Paris, France	3rd	Long Race Team
1981	World Cross Country Championships	Madrid, Spain	2nd	Long Race Individual
1981	World Cross Country Championships	Madrid, Spain	2nd	Long Race Team
1983	World Cross Country Championships	Gateshead, England	13th	Long Race Individual
1983	World Cross Country Championships	Gateshead, England	1st	Long Race Team
