= Hipódromo de la Zarzuela =

Race course in Madrid, Spain

Coordinates: 40°28′4.40″N 3°45′21.60″W

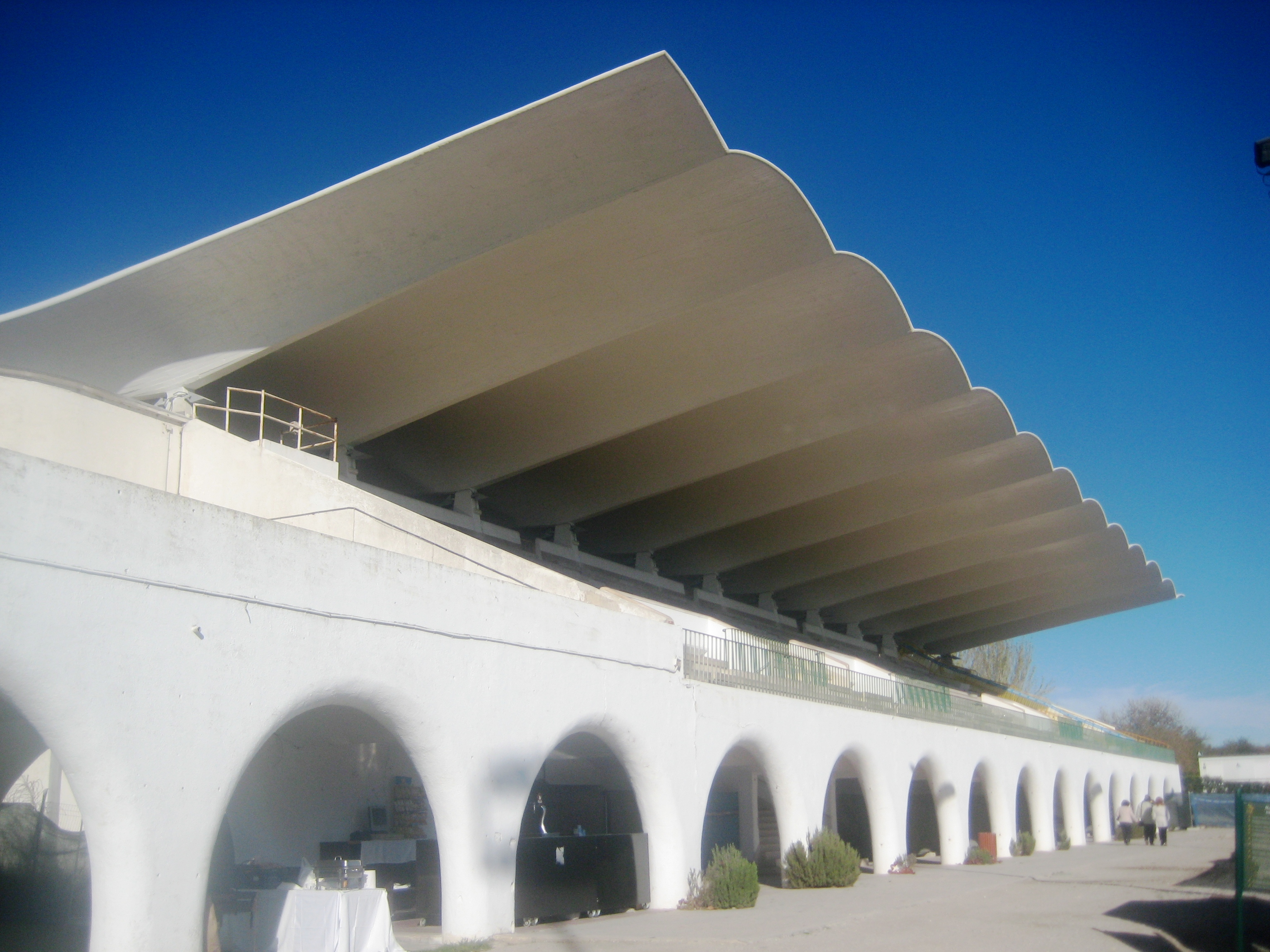
La Zarzuela race course with its distinctive roof

The Hipódromo de la Zarzuela is a race course on the outskirts of Madrid, Spain. It was designed in the 1930s. The architecture is in a modernist style which has been described as racionalismo madrileño.

Races held at the facility include the Gran Premio de Madrid which has been held there since 1941.

== History ==
The Hipódromo de la Zarzuela was designed to replace the Hipódromo de la Castellana, a course on the Paseo de la Castellana. The old course was demolished in the 1930s so that the site could be redeveloped as office buildings.

The architects were Carlos Arniches Moltó and Martín Domínguez Esteban, who had been collaborating since the 1920s. For this project, they were joined by the engineer Eduardo Torroja, a pioneer in the design of concrete shell structures. His work on the stands with their distinctive roof is recognised internationally.

The new race course was in an advanced state in 1936, but damage caused by the Spanish Civil War delayed completion. Inauguration took place in 1941.

== Conservation ==
The race course is protected by a heritage listing Bien de Interes Cultural. As well as listing the stands and other structures for protection, the citation refers to the paddock and pelouse (infield) as being of interest.

== See also ==
- Palace of Zarzuela
