= Giana Romanova =

Soviet middle-distance runner

Personal information
- Born: 10 March 1954 (age 72)
Medal record
Women's Athletics
Representing the Soviet Union
European Championships
Gold medal – first place	1978 Prague	1500 m

Giana Romanova (Russian: Гиана Романова; Ukrainian: Гіана Романова), née Giana Chernova, (10 March 1954) is a retired female middle-distance runner who represented the USSR in the 1970s. She set her personal best in the women's 1500 metres (3:59.01) on 3 September 1978 at the European Championships in Prague, Czechoslovakia, winning the gold medal.
