= 1983 IAAF World Cross Country Championships – Senior women's race =

Senior women's race at the 1983 IAAF World Cross Country Championships
- Organisers: IAAF
- Edition: 11th
- Date: March 20
- Host city: Gateshead, Tyne and Wear, England
- Venue: Riverside Park
- Events: 1
- Distances: 4.072 km – Senior women
- Participation: 111 athletes from 22 nations

The Senior women's race at the 1983 IAAF World Cross Country Championships was held in Gateshead, England, at the Riverside Park on March 20, 1983. A report on the event was given in the Glasgow Herald and in the Evening Times.

Complete results, medallists, and the results of British athletes were published.

== Race results ==
=== Senior women's race (4.072 km) ===
==== Individual ====
Rank	Athlete	Country	Time
1st place, gold medalist(s)	Grete Waitz	Norway	13:29
2nd place, silver medalist(s)	Alison Wiley	Canada	13:37
3rd place, bronze medalist(s)	Tatyana Pozdnyakova	Soviet Union	13:37
4	Joan Benoit	United States	13:57
5	Betty Springs	United States	14:00
6	Svetlana Ulmasova	Soviet Union	14:01
7	Francine Peeters	Belgium	14:03
8	Fiţa Lovin	Romania	14:04
9	Margaret Groos	United States	14:04
10	Aurora Cunha	Portugal	14:06
11	Alla Yushina	Soviet Union	14:08
12	Nancy Rooks	Canada	14:09
13	Jan Merrill	United States	14:12
14	Agnese Possamai	Italy	14:14
15	Doina Melinte	Romania	14:15
16	Anne-Marie Malone	Canada	14:17
17	Pilar Fernandez	Spain	14:18
18	Christine Benning	England	14:19
19	Christina Boxer	England	14:20
20	Carolyn Schuwalov	Australia	14:20
21	Yelena Sipatova	Soviet Union	14:21
22	Midde Hamrin	Sweden	14:21
23	Lynn Kanuka	Canada	14:22
24	Rosa Mota	Portugal	14:24
25	Nadia Dandolo	Italy	14:24
26	Christine Hughes	New Zealand	14:26
27	Sue Bruce	New Zealand	14:26
28	Kath Binns	England	14:26
29	Jane Furniss	England	14:27
30	Jacqueline Lefeuvre	France	14:30
31	Mary O'Connor	New Zealand	14:31
32	Mehan Sloane	Australia	14:31
33	Eva Ernström	Sweden	14:32
34	Albertina Machado	Portugal	14:34
35	Ingrid Kristiansen	Norway	14:35
36	Maria Radu	Romania	14:36
37	Wendy van Mierlo	Canada	14:36
38	Barbara Moore	New Zealand	14:36
39	Adriana Mustață	Romania	14:36
40	Nan Doak	United States	14:36
41	Janis Hams	Australia	14:37
42	Kathy Hadler	United States	14:38
43	Montserrat Abello	Spain	14:39
44	Debbie Elsmore	New Zealand	14:40
45	Lizanne Bussières	Canada	14:40
46	Joëlle De Brouwer	France	14:41
47	Patricia Deneuville	France	14:41
48	Deirdre Nagle	Ireland	14:44
49	Laura Blanco	Spain	14:44
50	Kim Lock	Wales	14:46
51	Fiona McQueen	Scotland	14:47
52	Mona Kleppe	Norway	14:48
53	Kathy Mearns	Scotland	14:48
54	Lucilia Soares	Portugal	14:48
55	Asuncion Sinobas	Spain	14:49
56	Alba Milana	Italy	14:49
57	Ana Isabel Alonso	Spain	14:50
58	Linda Milo	Belgium	14:51
59	Zehava Shmueli	Israel	14:53
60	Teresa Purton	England	14:55
61	Randi Bjørn	Norway	14:57
62	Birgitta Wåhlin	Sweden	14:57
63	Sharon Dalton	Australia	14:58
64	Lyudmila Medvedeva	Soviet Union	14:58
65	Charlotte Kaagh	Denmark	15:01
66	Sylvie Bornet	France	15:02
67	Elise Lyon	Scotland	15:04
68	Maria Rébélo	France	15:07
69	Marie-Christine Deurbroeck	Belgium	15:08
70	Debbie Peel	England	15:10
71	Louise Copp	Wales	15:11
72	Glenys Kroon	New Zealand	15:12
73	Conceição Ferreira	Portugal	15:12
74	Jeanette Nordgren	Sweden	15:13
75	Cristina Agusti	Spain	15:15
76	Véronique Renties	France	15:16
77	Jean Lorden	Scotland	15:16
78	Rita Borralho	Portugal	15:17
79	Ann Hilliard	Ireland	15:19
80	Betty van Steenbroeck	Belgium	15:20
81	Rhonda Mallinder	Australia	15:21
82	Laura Fogli	Italy	15:23
83	Louise McGrillen	Ireland	15:24
84	Eefje van Wissen	Netherlands	15:24
85	Ann-Marie Fox	Wales	15:33
86	Sicau West	Romania	15:36
87	Marit Holtklimpen	Norway	15:37
88	Greta Hickey	Ireland	15:38
89	Jean Lochhead	Wales	15:39
90	Dalila Mehira	Algeria	15:39
91	Mie Poulsen Jensen	Denmark	15:39
92	Linda van Vliet	Netherlands	15:41
93	Trijnie Smeenge	Netherlands	15:42
94	Yvonne Murray	Scotland	15:45
95	Eithne Kenny	Ireland	15:47
96	Yvonne Haglund	Sweden	15:54
97	Lynne MacDougall	Scotland	15:54
98	Mébarka El Hadj Abdellah	Algeria	15:59
99	Noeleen Mullan	Northern Ireland	15:59
100	Fiona Harwood	Wales	16:02
101	Desirée Heijnen	Netherlands	16:04
102	Rosemary Harron	Northern Ireland	16:06
103	Sally James	Wales	16:07
104	Sally Pierson	Australia	16:08
105	Paula Hawtin	Northern Ireland	16:09
106	Angela McCullagh	Northern Ireland	16:10
107	Mary Martin	Ireland	16:18
108	Camilla Harron	Northern Ireland	16:28
109	Baukje Hiemstra	Netherlands	16:49
110	Christine Lord	Northern Ireland	16:55
—	Alla Libutina	Soviet Union	DNF

==== Teams ====
Rank	Team	Points
1st place, gold medalist(s)	United States: Joan Benoit / 4; Betty Springs / 5; Margaret Groos / 9; Jan Merrill / 13; (Nan Doak) / (40); (Kathy Hadler) / (42)	31
2nd place, silver medalist(s)	Soviet Union: Tatyana Pozdnyakova / 3; Svetlana Ulmasova / 6; Alla Yushina / 11; Yelena Sipatova / 21; (Lyudmila Medvedeva) / (64); (Alla Libutina) / (DNF)	41
3rd place, bronze medalist(s)	Canada: Alison Wiley / 2; Nancy Rooks / 12; Anne-Marie Malone / 16; Lynn Kanuka / 23; (Wendy van Mierlo) / (37); (Lizanne Bussières) / (45)	53
4	England: Christine Benning / 18; Christina Boxer / 19; Kath Binns / 28; Jane Furniss / 29; (Teresa Purton) / (60); (Debbie Peel) / (70)	94
5	Romania: Fiţa Lovin / 8; Doina Melinte / 15; Maria Radu / 36; Adriana Mustata / 39; (Sicau West) / (86)	98
6	New Zealand: Christine Hughes / 26; Sue Bruce / 27; Mary O'Connor / 31; Barbara Moore / 38; (Debbie Elsmore) / (44); (Glenys Kroon) / (72)	122
7	Portugal: Aurora Cunha / 10; Rosa Mota / 24; Albertina Machado / 34; Lucilia Soares / 54; (Conceição Ferreira) / (73); (Rita Borralho) / (78)	122
8	Norway: Grete Waitz / 1; Ingrid Kristiansen / 35; Mona Kleppe / 52; Randi Bjørn / 61; (Marit Holtklimpen) / (87)	149
9	Australia: Carolyn Schuwalov / 20; Mehan Sloane / 32; Janis Hams / 41; Sharon Dalton / 63; (Rhonda Mallinder) / (81); (Sally Pierson) / (104)	156
10	Spain: Pilar Fernandez / 17; Montserrat Abello / 43; Laura Blanco / 49; Asuncion Sinobas / 55; (Ana Isabel Alonso) / (57); (Cristina Agusti) / (75)	164
11	Italy: Agnese Possamai / 14; Nadia Dandolo / 25; Alba Milana / 56; Laura Fogli / 82	177
12	France: Jacqueline Lefeuvre / 30; Joëlle Debrouwer / 46; Patricia Deneuville / 47; Sylvie Bornet / 66; (Maria Rébélo) / (68); (Véronique Renties) / (76)	189
13	Sweden: Midde Hamrin / 22; Eva Ernström / 33; Birgitta Wåhlin / 62; Jeanette Nordgren / 74; (Yvonne Haglund) / (96)	191
14	Belgium: Francine Peeters / 7; Linda Milo / 58; Marie-Christine Deurbroeck / 69; Betty van Steenbroeck / 80	214
15	Scotland: Fiona McQueen / 51; Kathy Mearns / 53; Elise Lyon / 67; Jean Lorden / 77; (Yvonne Murray) / (94); (Lynne MacDougall) / (97)	248
16	Wales: Kim Lock / 50; Louise Copp / 71; Ann-Marie Fox / 85; Jean Lochhead / 89; (Fiona Harwood) / (100); (Sally James) / (103)	295
17	Ireland: Deirdre Nagle / 48; Ann Hilliard / 79; Louise McGrillen / 83; Greta Hickey / 88; (Eithne Kenny) / (95); (Mary Martin) / (107)	298
18	Netherlands: Eefje van Wissen / 84; Linda van Vliet / 92; Trijnie Smeenge / 93; Desirée Heijnen / 101; (Baukje Hiemstra) / (109)	370
19	Northern Ireland: Noeleen Mullan / 99; Rosemary Harron / 102; Paula Hawtin / 105; Angela McCullagh / 106; (Camilla Harron) / (108); (Christine Lord) / (110)	412

- Note: Athletes in parentheses did not score for the team result

== Participation ==
An unofficial count yields the participation of 111 athletes from 22 countries in the Senior women's race. This is in agreement with the official numbers as published.

- Algeria (2)
- Australia (6)
- Belgium (4)
- Canada (6)
- Denmark (2)
- England (6)
- France (6)
- Ireland (6)
- Israel (1)
- Italy (4)
- Netherlands (5)
- New Zealand (6)
- Northern Ireland (6)
- Norway (5)
- Portugal (6)
- Romania (5)
- Scotland (6)
- Soviet Union (6)
- Spain (6)
- Sweden (5)
- United States (6)
- Wales (6)

== See also ==
- 1983 IAAF World Cross Country Championships – Senior men's race
- 1983 IAAF World Cross Country Championships – Junior men's race
