= 1984 IAAF World Cross Country Championships – Senior women's race =

Senior women's race at the 1984 IAAF World Cross Country Championships
- Organisers: IAAF
- Edition: 12th
- Date: March 25
- Host city: East Rutherford, New Jersey, United States
- Venue: Meadowlands Racetrack
- Events: 1
- Distances: 5 km – Senior women
- Participation: 109 athletes from 24 nations

The Senior women's race at the 1984 IAAF World Cross Country Championships was held in East Rutherford, New Jersey, United States, at the Meadowlands Racetrack on March 25, 1984. A report on the event was given in the Glasgow Herald.

Complete results, medallists, and the results of British athletes were published.

== Race results ==
=== Senior women's race (5 km) ===
==== Individual ====
Rank	Athlete	Country	Time
1st place, gold medalist(s)	Maricica Puică	Romania	15:56
2nd place, silver medalist(s)	Galina Zakharova	Soviet Union	15:58
3rd place, bronze medalist(s)	Grete Waitz	Norway	15:58
4	Ingrid Kristiansen	Norway	16:04
5	Jane Furniss	England	16:10
6	Christine Benning	England	16:15
7	Midde Hamrin	Sweden	16:16
8	Angela Tooby	Wales	16:18
9	Betty Springs	United States	16:20
10	Cathy Branta	United States	16:21
11	Eva Ernström	Sweden	16:21
12	Francine Peeters	Belgium	16:26
13	Zhanna Tursunova	Soviet Union	16:26
14	Dianne Rodger	New Zealand	16:27
15	Ruth Smeeth	England	16:28
16	Sabrina Dornhoefer	United States	16:30
17	Cathie Twomey	United States	16:31
18	Lynn Williams	Canada	16:31
19	Mary O'Connor	New Zealand	16:33
20	Tina Krebs	Denmark	16:35
21	Regina Joyce	Ireland	16:35
22	Roisin Smyth	Ireland	16:36
23	Aurora Cunha	Portugal	16:37
24	Rosa Mota	Portugal	16:38
25	Brenda Webb	United States	16:38
26	Monica Joyce	Ireland	16:41
27	Christine Hughes	New Zealand	16:41
28	Alba Milana	Italy	16:41
29	Faina Andreyeva	Soviet Union	16:43
30	Jacqueline Lefeuvre	France	16:44
31	Sue Bruce	New Zealand	16:45
32	Nan Doak	United States	16:48
33	Nancy Rooks	Canada	16:50
34	Paula Ilie	Romania	16:50
35	Christel Jennis	Belgium	16:51
36	Louise McGrillen	Ireland	16:51
37	Pilar Fernandez	Spain	16:52
38	Avril McClung	Northern Ireland	16:52
39	Carole Bradford	England	16:52
40	Elena Fidatof	Romania	16:53
41	Fiona McQueen	Scotland	16:53
42	Albertina Machado	Portugal	16:54
43	Birgitta Wåhlin	Sweden	16:55
44	Corinne Debaets	Belgium	16:55
45	Linda Milo	Belgium	16:56
46	Kim Lock	Wales	16:56
47	Tuija Toivonen	Finland	16:56
48	Montserrat Abello	Spain	16:57
49	Agnese Possamai	Italy	16:58
50	Linden Wilde	New Zealand	17:00
51	Christine Loiseau	France	17:00
52	Margareta Keszeg	Romania	17:02
53	Ellen Wessinghage	West Germany	17:05
54	Carol Haigh	England	17:06
55	Julie Laughton	England	17:07
56	Charlotte Kaagh	Denmark	17:09
57	Isabelle Matthys	France	17:10
58	Mary Friel	Ireland	17:10
59	Maria Lelut	France	17:11
60	Rita Marchisio	Italy	17:11
61	Annika Lewin	Sweden	17:11
62	Kate Wiley	Canada	17:12
63	Marie-Christine Deurbroeck	Belgium	17:12
64	Debbie Scott	Canada	17:13
65	Sinikka Keskitalo	Finland	17:16
66	Asuncion Sinobas	Spain	17:16
67	Conceição Ferreira	Portugal	17:17
68	Magda Ilands	Belgium	17:17
69	Martine Fays	France	17:17
70	Susan French	Canada	17:18
71	Rosanna Munerotto	Italy	17:21
72	Marion Josefsen	Norway	17:23
73	Jennifer Christiansen	Canada	17:23
74	Mercedes Calleja	Spain	17:24
75	Kirsti Voldnes	Norway	17:26
76	Marciela Hurtado	Mexico	17:26
77	Elise Lyon	Scotland	17:28
78	Roberta Brunet	Italy	17:29
79	Mona Kleppe	Norway	17:33
80	Lucilia Soares	Portugal	17:34
81	Christine Whittingham	Scotland	17:34
82	Sara Harnett	New Zealand	17:34
83	Kersti Jakobsen	Denmark	17:35
84	Kirsty Husband	Scotland	17:43
85	Anneli Edling	Sweden	17:45
86	Lone Dybdahl	Denmark	17:46
87	Kathy Mearns	Scotland	17:50
88	Cristina Agusti	Spain	17:52
89	Mitica Junghiatu	Romania	17:55
90	Maria Curatolo	Italy	17:55
91	Ana Isabel Alonso	Spain	17:56
92	Marit Holtklimpen	Norway	18:07
93	Mie Poulsen Jensen	Denmark	18:12
94	Helle Jørgensen	Denmark	18:12
95	Jean Lochhead	Wales	18:12
96	Louise Copp	Wales	18:13
97	Sally James	Wales	18:15
98	Elizabeth Oldfield	Wales	18:18
99	Angela McCullagh	Northern Ireland	18:22
100	Andrea Everett	Scotland	18:36
101	Marisela de Díaz	Venezuela	18:42
102	Kay McGowan	Northern Ireland	19:02
103	Una Barry	Northern Ireland	19:06
104	Allison O'Neill	Northern Ireland	19:29
105	Susanna Herrera	Mexico	20:06
106	Veneranda Avila	Dominican Republic	20:56
107	Fanny Lopez	Dominican Republic	20:58
108	Elizabeth Gladfelter	U.S. Virgin Islands	21:39
—	Joëlle De Brouwer	France	DNF

==== Teams ====
Rank	Team	Points
1st place, gold medalist(s)	United States: Betty Springs / 9; Cathy Branta / 10; Sabrina Dornhoefer / 16; Cathie Twomey / 17; (Brenda Webb) / (25); (Nan Doak) / (32)	52
2nd place, silver medalist(s)	England: Jane Furniss / 5; Christine Benning / 6; Ruth Smeeth / 15; Carole Bradford / 39; (Carol Haigh) / (54); (Julie Laughton) / (55)	65
3rd place, bronze medalist(s)	New Zealand: Dianne Rodger / 14; Mary O'Connor / 19; Christine Hughes / 27; Sue Bruce / 31; (Linden Wilde) / (50); (Sara Harnett) / (82)	91
4	Ireland: Regina Joyce / 21; Roisin Smyth / 22; Monica Joyce / 26; Louise McGrillen / 36; (Mary Friel) / (58)	105
5	Sweden: Midde Hamrin / 7; Eva Ernström / 11; Birgitta Wåhlin / 43; Annika Lewin / 61; (Anneli Edling) / (85)	122
6	Romania: Maricica Puică / 1; Paula Ilie / 34; Elena Fidatof / 40; Margareta Keszeg / 52; (Mitica Junghiatu) / (89)	127
7	Belgium: Francine Peeters / 12; Christel Jennis / 35; Corinne Debaets / 44; Linda Milo / 45; (Marie-Christine Deurbroeck) / (63); (Magda Ilands) / (68)	136
8	Norway: Grete Waitz / 3; Ingrid Kristiansen / 4; Marion Josefsen / 72; Kirsti Voldnes / 75; (Mona Kleppe) / (79); (Marit Holtklimpen) / (92)	154
9	Portugal: Aurora Cunha / 23; Rosa Mota / 24; Albertina Machado / 42; Conceição Ferreira / 67; (Lucilia Soares) / (80)	156
10	Canada: Lynn Williams / 18; Nancy Rooks / 33; Kate Wiley / 62; Debbie Scott / 64; (Susan French) / (70); (Jennifer Christiansen) / (73)	177
11	France: Jacqueline Lefeuvre / 30; Christine Loiseau / 51; Isabelle Matthys / 57; Maria Lelut / 59; (Martine Fays) / (69); (Joëlle Debrouwer) / (DNF)	197
12	Italy: Alba Milana / 28; Agnese Possamai / 49; Rita Marchisio / 60; Rosanna Munerotto / 71; (Roberta Brunet) / (78); (Maria Curatolo) / (90)	208
13	Spain: Pilar Fernandez / 37; Montserrat Abello / 48; Asuncion Sinobas / 66; Mercedes Calleja / 74; (Cristina Agusti) / (88); (Ana Isabel Alonso) / (91)	225
14	Denmark: Tina Krebs / 20; Charlotte Kaagh / 56; Kersti Jakobsen / 83; Lone Dybdahl / 86; (Mie Poulsen Jensen) / (93); (Helle Jørgensen) / (94)	245
15	Wales: Angela Tooby / 8; Kim Lock / 46; Jean Lochhead / 95; Louise Copp / 96; (Sally James) / (97); (Elizabeth Oldfield) / (98)	245
16	Scotland: Fiona McQueen / 41; Elise Lyon / 77; Christine Whittingham / 81; Kirsty Husband / 84; (Kathy Mearns) / (87); (Andrea Everett) / (100)	283
17	Northern Ireland: Avril McClung / 38; Angela McCullagh / 99; Kay McGowan / 102; Una Barry / 103; (Allison O'Neill) / (104)	342

- Note: Athletes in parentheses did not score for the team result

== Participation ==
An unofficial count yields the participation of 109 athletes from 24 countries in the Senior women's race. This is in agreement with the official numbers as published.

- Belgium (6)
- Canada (6)
- Denmark (6)
- Dominican Republic (2)
- England (6)
- Finland (2)
- France (6)
- Ireland (5)
- Italy (6)
- Mexico (2)
- New Zealand (6)
- Northern Ireland (5)
- Norway (6)
- Portugal (5)
- Romania (5)
- Scotland (6)
- Soviet Union (3)
- Spain (6)
- Sweden (5)
- United States (6)
- U.S. Virgin Islands (1)
- Venezuela (1)
- Wales (6)
- West Germany (1)

== See also ==
- 1984 IAAF World Cross Country Championships – Senior men's race
- 1984 IAAF World Cross Country Championships – Junior men's race
