= 1982 IAAF World Cross Country Championships – Senior women's race =

Senior women's race at the 1982 IAAF World Cross Country Championships
- Organisers: IAAF
- Edition: 10th
- Date: March 21
- Host city: Rome, Italy
- Venue: Ippodromo delle Capannelle
- Events: 1
- Distances: 4.663 km – Senior women
- Participation: 109 athletes from 22 nations

The Senior women's race at the 1982 IAAF World Cross Country Championships was held in Rome, Italy, at the Ippodromo delle Capannelle on March 21, 1982. A report on the event was given in the Glasgow Herald.

Complete results, medallists, and the results of British athletes were published.

== Race results ==
=== Senior women's race (4.663 km) ===
==== Individual ====
Rank	Athlete	Country	Time
1st place, gold medalist(s)	Maricica Puică	Romania	14:38.9
2nd place, silver medalist(s)	Fiţa Lovin	Romania	14:40.5
3rd place, bronze medalist(s)	Grete Waitz	Norway	14:43.9
4	Agnese Possamai	Italy	14:46.9
5	Dianne Rodger	New Zealand	14:49.2
6	Ingrid Kristiansen	Norway	14:50.9
7	Yelena Sipatova	Soviet Union	14:51.9
8	Raisa Smekhnova	Soviet Union	14:55.5
9	Nadia Dandolo	Italy	14:57.9
10	Jan Merrill	United States	14:59.5
11	Tatyana Pozdnyakova	Soviet Union	15:00.1
12	Kate Wiley	Canada	15:01
13	Ann Ford	England	15:02.2
14	Paula Fudge	England	15:03.8
15	Lynn Kanuka	Canada	15:04.5
16	Jane Furniss	England	15:06.3
17	Marty Cooksey	United States	15:07.9
18	Galina Zakharova	Soviet Union	15:08.8
19	Cristina Tomasini	Italy	15:09.6
20	Aileen O'Connor	United States	15:10.4
21	Rosa Mota	Portugal	15:10.7
22	Pilar Fernandez	Spain	15:13.2
23	Brenda Webb	United States	15:18
24	Ruth Smeeth	England	15:18.3
25	Rita Marchisio	Italy	15:21.8
26	Mary O'Connor	New Zealand	15:22.8
27	Joan Hansen	United States	15:23.7
28	Alice Silva	Portugal	15:23.9
29	Alla Yushina	Soviet Union	15:24.2
30	Amelia Lorza Lopez	Spain	15:24.6
31	Jacqueline Lefeuvre	France	15:24.8
32	Annick Lebreton	France	15:25.2
33	Maria Bak	Poland	15:25.8
34	Asuncion Sinobas	Spain	15:26.1
35	Margherita Gargano	Italy	15:26.3
36	Christine Price	Scotland	15:26.6
37	Beate Liebich	East Germany	15:31
38	Nancy Rooks	Canada	15:31.4
39	Anne-Marie Malone	Canada	15:32.8
40	Renata Kokowska	Poland	15:34.2
41	Christina Boxer	England	15:34.5
42	Yvonne Murray	Scotland	15:35.2
43	Patricia Appleby	Ireland	15:35.4
44	Joëlle Debrouwer	France	15:36.1
45	Wanda Panfil	Poland	15:37.1
46	Montserrat Abello	Spain	15:37.9
47	Aurora Cunha	Portugal	15:38.4
48	Sandra Arthurton	England	15:39.3
49	Mercedes Calleja	Spain	15:40.1
50	Carla Beurskens	Netherlands	15:40.4
51	Martine Fays	France	15:41.3
52	Hilary Hollick	Wales	15:43.1
53	Kim Lock	Wales	15:43.2
54	Maria Andersson	Sweden	15:44.2
55	Mona Kleppe	Norway	15:45.5
56	Anita Andersson	Sweden	15:46.9
57	Jeanette Nordgren	Sweden	15:47.2
58	Isabelle Matthys	France	15:47.5
59	Betty van Steenbroeck	Belgium	15:47.8
60	Marie-Christine Deurbroeck	Belgium	15:49.1
61	Stanislawa Fedyk	Poland	15:50.8
62	Marianne Østbye	Norway	15:51.5
63	Francine Peeters	Belgium	15:52.4
64	Katarina Wåhlin	Sweden	15:52.6
65	Kathy Mearns	Scotland	15:52.8
66	Jean Lorden	Scotland	15:56.2
67	Birgitta Wåhlin	Sweden	15:56.5
68	Charlotte Kaagh	Denmark	15:57.7
69	Magda Ilands	Belgium	16:00.4
70	Monica O'Reilly	Ireland	16:03.2
71	Liz Lynch	Scotland	16:03.7
72	Zehava Shmueli	Israel	16:04.9
73	Ana Isabel Alonso	Spain	16:06.7
74	Thelwyn Bateman	Wales	16:07.2
75	Lesley Welch	United States	16:09.4
76	Sara Neil	Canada	16:09.9
77	Dalila Mehira	Algeria	16:11
78	Albertina Machado	Portugal	16:11.6
79	Annie van Stiphout	Netherlands	16:12.4
80	Bronwen Cardy	Wales	16:15.5
81	Lynne MacDougall	Scotland	16:16.8
82	Lucilia Soares	Portugal	16:17.5
83	Ewa Wrzosek	Poland	16:18.3
84	Mie Poulsen Jensen	Denmark	16:19.7
85	Louise McGrillen	Ireland	16:21.2
86	Linda Milo	Belgium	16:22.2
87	Elly van Hulst	Netherlands	16:24.6
88	Conceição Ferreira	Portugal	16:29.2
89	Eithne Kenny	Ireland	16:30.9
90	Emily Dowling	Ireland	16:32.6
91	Valentine Bakker	Netherlands	16:39.5
92	Patricia Deneuville	France	16:43.2
93	Susanne Nörgaard	Sweden	16:43.4
94	Mette Holm Hansen	Denmark	16:52.4
95	Fionnuala Morrish	Ireland	16:57.6
96	Leila Bendahmane	Algeria	17:00.7
97	Tracy Long	Wales	17:02.8
98	Aichia Bouziane	Algeria	17:04.9
99	Tineke Kluft	Netherlands	17:06.3
100	Malika Bellounis	Algeria	17:08.1
101	Kathy Williams	Wales	17:10.1
102	Mébarka El Hadj Abdellah	Algeria	17:19
103	Jacky Winkelman	Netherlands	17:34.7
104	Tracie Kelly	Canada	17:50.1
105	Dalila Baouche	Algeria	18:04.6
—	Gabriella Dorio	Italy	DNF
—	Celina Sokolowska	Poland	DNF
—	Susan Olsen	Denmark	DNF
—	Ulla Nielsen	Denmark	DNF

==== Teams ====
Rank	Team	Points
1st place, gold medalist(s)	Soviet Union: Yelena Sipatova / 7; Raisa Smekhnova / 8; Tatyana Pozdnyakova / 11; Galina Zakharova / 18; (Alla Yushina) / (29)	44
2nd place, silver medalist(s)	Italy: Agnese Possamai / 4; Nadia Dandolo / 9; Cristina Tomasini / 19; Rita Marchisio / 25; (Margherita Gargano) / (35); (Gabriella Dorio) / (DNF)	57
3rd place, bronze medalist(s)	England: Ann Ford / 13; Paula Fudge / 14; Jane Furniss / 16; Ruth Smeeth / 24; (Christina Boxer) / (41); (Sandra Arthurton) / (48)	67
4	United States: Jan Merrill / 10; Marty Cooksey / 17; Aileen O'Connor / 20; Brenda Webb / 23; (Joan Hansen) / (27); (Lesley Welch) / (75)	70
5	Canada: Kate Wiley / 12; Lynn Kanuka / 15; Nancy Rooks / 38; Anne-Marie Malone / 39; (Sara Neil) / (76); (Tracie Kelly) / (104)	104
6	Norway: Grete Waitz / 3; Ingrid Kristiansen / 6; Mona Kleppe / 55; Marianne Østbye / 62	126
7	Spain: Pilar Fernandez / 22; Amelia Lorza Lopez / 30; Asuncion Sinobas / 34; Montserrat Abello / 46; (Mercedes Calleja) / (49); (Ana Isabel Alonso) / (73)	132
8	France: Jacqueline Lefeuvre / 31; Annick Lebreton / 32; Joëlle Debrouwer / 44; Martine Fays / 51; (Isabelle Matthys) / (58); (Patricia Deneuville) / (92)	158
9	Portugal: Rosa Mota / 21; Alice Silva / 28; Aurora Cunha / 47; Albertina Machado / 78; (Lucilia Soares) / (82); (Conceição Ferreira) / (88)	174
10	Poland: Maria Bak / 33; Renata Kokowska / 40; Wanda Panfil / 45; Stanislawa Fedyk / 61; (Ewa Wrzosek) / (83); (Celina Sokolowska) / (DNF)	179
11	Scotland: Christine Price / 36; Yvonne Murray / 42; Kathy Mearns / 65; Jean Lorden / 66; (Liz Lynch) / (71); (Lynne MacDougall) / (81)	209
12	Sweden: Maria Andersson / 54; Anita Andersson / 56; Jeanette Nordgren / 57; Katarina Wåhlin / 64; (Birgitta Wåhlin) / (67); (Susanne Nörgaard) / (93)	231
13	Belgium: Betty van Steenbroeck / 59; Marie-Christine Deurbroeck / 60; Francine Peeters / 63; Magda Ilands / 69; (Linda Milo) / (86)	251
14	Wales: Hilary Hollick / 52; Kim Lock / 53; Thelwyn Bateman / 74; Bronwen Cardy / 80; (Tracy Long) / (97); (Kathy Williams) / (101)	259
15	Ireland: Patricia Appleby / 43; Monica O'Reilly / 70; Louise McGrillen / 85; Eithne Kenny / 89; (Emily Dowling) / (90); (Fionnuala Morrish) / (95)	287
16	Netherlands: Carla Beurskens / 50; Annie van Stiphout / 79; Elly van Hulst / 87; Valentine Bakker / 91; (Tineke Kluft) / (99); (Jacky Winkelman) / (103)	307
17	Algeria: Dalila Mehira / 77; Leila Bendahmane / 96; Aichia Bouziane / 98; Malika Bellounis / 100; (Mébarka El Hadj Abdellah) / (102); (Dalila Baouche) / (105)	371
DNF	Denmark: (Charlotte Kaagh) / (68); (Mie Poulsen Jensen) / (84); (Mette Holm Hansen) / (94); (Susan Olsen) / (DNF); (Ulla Nielsen) / (DNF)	DNF

- Note: Athletes in parentheses did not score for the team result

== Participation ==
An unofficial count yields the participation of 109 athletes from 22 countries in the Senior women's race. This is in agreement with the official numbers as published.

- Algeria (6)
- Belgium (5)
- Canada (6)
- Denmark (5)
- East Germany (1)
- England (6)
- France (6)
- Ireland (6)
- Israel (1)
- Italy (6)
- Netherlands (6)
- New Zealand (2)
- Norway (4)
- Poland (6)
- Portugal (6)
- Romania (2)
- Scotland (6)
- Soviet Union (5)
- Spain (6)
- Sweden (6)
- United States (6)
- Wales (6)

== See also ==
- 1982 IAAF World Cross Country Championships – Senior men's race
- 1982 IAAF World Cross Country Championships – Junior men's race
