= 1985 IAAF World Cross Country Championships – Senior women's race =

Senior women's race at the 1985 IAAF World Cross Country Championships
- Organisers: IAAF
- Edition: 13th
- Date: March 24
- Host city: Lisbon, Portugal
- Venue: Sports Complex of Jamor
- Events: 1
- Distances: 4.99 km – Senior women
- Participation: 131 athletes from 28 nations

The Senior women's race at the 1985 IAAF World Cross Country Championships was held in Lisbon, Portugal, at the Sports Complex of Jamor on March 24, 1985. A report on the event was given in the Glasgow Herald.

Complete results, medallists, and the results of British athletes were published.

== Race results ==
=== Senior women's race (4.99 km) ===
==== Individual ====
Rank	Athlete	Country	Time
1st place, gold medalist(s)	Zola Budd	England	15:01
2nd place, silver medalist(s)	Cathy Branta	United States	15:24
3rd place, bronze medalist(s)	Ingrid Kristiansen	Norway	15:27
4	Fiţa Lovin	Romania	15:35
5	Cornelia Bürki	Switzerland	15:38
6	Angela Tooby	Wales	15:40
7	Olga Bondarenko	Soviet Union	15:40
8	Sue Bruce	New Zealand	15:42
9	Betty Springs	United States	15:44
10	Elena Fidatof	Romania	15:47
11	Debbie Scott	Canada	15:49
12	Monica Joyce	Ireland	15:49
13	Rosa Mota	Portugal	15:50
14	Agnese Possamai	Italy	15:50
15	Shelly Steely	United States	15:51
16	Kathryn Hayes	United States	15:54
17	Annette Sergent	France	15:55
18	Susan Lee	Canada	15:56
19	Tatyana Pozdnyakova	Soviet Union	15:56
20	Marina Rodchenkova	Soviet Union	15:56
21	Sharon Dalton	Australia	15:56
22	Albertina Machado	Portugal	15:57
23	Martine Fays	France	15:57
24	Carla Beurskens	Netherlands	15:58
25	Christine McMiken	New Zealand	16:00
26	Jacqueline Lefeuvre	France	16:01
27	Angela Chalmers	Canada	16:02
28	Mary Knisely	United States	16:03
29	Susan Tooby	Wales	16:04
30	Aurora Cunha	Portugal	16:05
31	Irina Bondarchuk	Soviet Union	16:05
32	Ana Isabel Alonso	Spain	16:05
33	Wang Huabi	China	16:05
34	Paula Ilie	Romania	16:06
35	Hassania Darami	Morocco	16:09
36	Eva Ernström	Sweden	16:09
37	Mébarka El Hadj Abdellah	Algeria	16:10
38	Christine Sørum	Norway	16:11
39	Francine Peeters	Belgium	16:12
40	Louise McGrillen	Ireland	16:13
41	Tatyana Sokolova	Soviet Union	16:13
42	Yvonne Murray	Scotland	16:13
43	Maria Lelut	France	16:14
44	Julie Laughton	England	16:14
45	Sylvie Bornet	France	16:14
46	Nan Doak	United States	16:15
47	Gail Rear	New Zealand	16:15
48	Mariana Stanescu	Romania	16:16
49	Corinne Debaets	Belgium	16:16
50	Cristina Tomasini	Italy	16:16
51	Anne Jorun Flaten	Norway	16:17
52	Mary Cotton	England	16:17
53	Li Xiuxia	China	16:18
54	Sally Pierson	Australia	16:20
55	Linda Milo	Belgium	16:20
56	Paula Fudge	England	16:22
57	Brenda Shackleton	Canada	16:22
58	Amelia Lorza Lopez	Spain	16:23
59	Ann Hilliard	Ireland	16:24
60	Rita Marchisio	Italy	16:24
61	Roberta Brunet	Italy	16:24
62	Ulla Marquette	Canada	16:25
63	Jill Rothwell	England	16:25
64	Mary O'Connor	New Zealand	16:26
65	Liu Aixuan	China	16:27
66	Jocelyne Villeton	France	16:27
67	Grete Kirkeberg	Norway	16:28
68	Tove Lutdal	Norway	16:29
69	Lucilia Soares	Portugal	16:29
70	Kerith Duncanson	Australia	16:30
71	Marina Samy	England	16:31
72	Rosa Oliveira	Portugal	16:32
73	Teresa Recio	Spain	16:33
74	Susi Riermeier	West Germany	16:34
75	Kersti Jakobsen	Denmark	16:34
76	Wilma Rusman	Netherlands	16:38
77	Asuncion Sinobas	Spain	16:42
78	Deirdre Nagle	Ireland	16:43
79	Luo Yuxiu	China	16:43
80	Sandra Rettie	Canada	16:43
81	Linden Wilde	New Zealand	16:43
82	Astrid Schmidt	West Germany	16:44
83	Mehan Sloane	Australia	16:46
84	Elise Lyon	Scotland	16:46
85	Martine Oppliger	Switzerland	16:47
86	Sheila Purves	Hong Kong	16:48
87	Iulia Besliu	Romania	16:48
88	Betty Molteni	Italy	16:49
89	Wendy Ore	Wales	16:49
90	Montserrat Abello	Spain	16:50
91	Ria van Landeghem	Belgium	16:50
92	Christiane Finke	West Germany	16:54
93	Anne Keenan	Ireland	16:55
94	Christine Price	Scotland	16:56
95	Zhang Shuxian	China	16:57
96	Barbara King	Wales	16:58
97	Conceição Ferreira	Portugal	16:59
98	Anne Lord	Australia	17:00
99	Ute Jamrozy	West Germany	17:01
100	Eefje van Wissen	Netherlands	17:03
101	June Standing	Scotland	17:03
102	Daria Nauer	Switzerland	17:04
103	Joke van Gerven	Netherlands	17:05
104	Begoña Herraez	Spain	17:06
105	Liève Slegers	Belgium	17:06
106	Birgitta Wåhlin	Sweden	17:09
107	Karen MacLeod	Scotland	17:10
108	Lynne Maddison	Wales	17:11
109	Avril McClung	Northern Ireland	17:17
110	Mie Poulsen Jensen	Denmark	17:21
111	Isabella Moretti	Switzerland	17:22
112	Gitte Karlshøj	Denmark	17:27
113	Lynda Bain	Scotland	17:29
114	Greta Hickey	Ireland	17:33
115	Camilla Harron	Northern Ireland	17:39
116	Jenny Lund	Australia	17:46
117	Rachida Asname	Morocco	17:48
118	Fiona Harwood	Wales	18:03
119	Hanne Kjärsgaard	Denmark	18:04
120	Rose Gavigan	Northern Ireland	18:11
121	Una Barry	Northern Ireland	18:16
122	Hanne Rasmussen	Denmark	18:20
123	Karin Hansen	Denmark	18:38
124	Amneh Odeh Murshed	Jordan	19:42
125	Sinead McGranaghan	Northern Ireland	19:47
126	Suzanne Bensadon	Gibraltar	20:17
127	Jenny Summers	Gibraltar	20:51
128	Joanna Lavarello	Gibraltar	21:30
129	Susan Duran	Gibraltar	22:41
130	Susan Garcia	Gibraltar	23:16
131	Jacky Carreras	Gibraltar	24:12

==== Teams ====
Rank	Team	Points
1st place, gold medalist(s)	United States: Cathy Branta / 2; Betty Springs / 9; Shelly Steely / 15; Kathryn Hayes / 16; (Mary Knisely) / (28); (Nan Doak) / (46)	42
2nd place, silver medalist(s)	Soviet Union: Olga Bondarenko / 7; Tatyana Pozdnyakova / 19; Marina Rodchenkova / 20; Irina Bondarchuk / 31; (Tatyana Sokolova) / (41)	77
3rd place, bronze medalist(s)	Romania: Fiţa Lovin / 4; Elena Fidatof / 10; Paula Ilie / 34; Mariana Stanescu / 48; (Iulia Besliu) / (87)	96
4	France: Annette Sergent / 17; Martine Fays / 23; Jacqueline Lefeuvre / 26; Maria Lelut / 43; (Sylvie Bornet) / (45); (Jocelyne Villeton) / (66)	109
5	Canada: Debbie Scott / 11; Susan Lee / 18; Angela Chalmers / 27; Brenda Shackleton / 57; (Ulla Marquette) / (62); (Sandra Rettie) / (80)	113
6	Portugal: Rosa Mota / 13; Albertina Machado / 22; Aurora Cunha / 30; Lucilia Soares / 69; (Rosa Oliveira) / (72); (Conceição Ferreira) / (97)	134
7	New Zealand: Sue Bruce / 8; Christine McMiken / 25; Gail Rear / 47; Mary O'Connor / 64; (Linden Wilde) / (81)	144
8	England: Zola Budd / 1; Julie Laughton / 44; Mary Cotton / 52; Paula Fudge / 56; (Jill Rothwell) / (63); (Marina Samy) / (71)	153
9	Norway: Ingrid Kristiansen / 3; Christine Sørum / 38; Anne Jorun Flaten / 51; Grete Kirkeberg / 67; (Tove Lutdal) / (68)	159
10	Italy: Agnese Possamai / 14; Cristina Tomasini / 50; Rita Marchisio / 60; Roberta Brunet / 61; (Betty Molteni) / (88)	185
11	Ireland: Monica Joyce / 12; Louise McGrillen / 40; Ann Hilliard / 59; Deirdre Nagle / 78; (Anne Keenan) / (93); (Greta Hickey) / (114)	189
12	Wales: Angela Tooby / 6; Susan Tooby / 29; Wendy Ore / 89; Barbara King / 96; (Lynne Maddison) / (108); (Fiona Harwood) / (118)	220
13	Australia: Sharon Dalton / 21; Sally Pierson / 54; Kerith Duncanson / 70; Mehan Sloane / 83; (Anne Lord) / (98); (Jenny Lund) / (116)	228
14	China: Wang Huabi / 33; Li Xiuxia / 53; Liu Aixuan / 65; Luo Yuxiu / 79; (Zhang Shuxian) / (95)	230
15	Belgium: Francine Peeters / 39; Corinne Debaets / 49; Linda Milo / 55; Ria van Landeghem / 91; (Liève Slegers) / (105)	234
16	Spain: Ana Isabel Alonso / 32; Amelia Lorza Lopez / 58; Teresa Recio / 73; Asuncion Sinobas / 77; (Montserrat Abello) / (90); (Begoña Herraez) / (104)	240
17	Netherlands: Carla Beurskens / 24; Wilma Rusman / 76; Eefje van Wissen / 100; Joke van Gerven / 103	303
18	Switzerland: Cornelia Bürki / 5; Martine Oppliger / 85; Daria Nauer / 102; Isabella Moretti / 111	303
19	Scotland: Yvonne Murray / 42; Elise Lyon / 84; Christine Price / 94; June Standing / 101; (Karen MacLeod) / (107); (Lynda Bain) / (113)	321
20	West Germany: Susi Riermeier / 74; Astrid Schmidt / 82; Christiane Finke / 92; Ute Jamrozy / 99	347
21	Denmark: Kersti Jakobsen / 75; Mie Poulsen Jensen / 110; Gitte Karlshøj / 112; Hanne Kjärsgaard / 119; (Hanne Rasmussen) / (122); (Karin Hansen) / (123)	416
22	Northern Ireland: Avril McClung / 109; Camilla Harron / 115; Rose Gavigan / 120; Una Barry / 121; (Sinead McGranaghan) / (125)	465
23	Gibraltar: Suzanne Bensadon / 126; Jenny Summers / 127; Joanna Lavarello / 128; Susan Duran / 129; (Susan Garcia) / (130); (Jacky Carreras) / (131)	510

- Note: Athletes in parentheses did not score for the team result

== Participation ==
An unofficial count yields the participation of 131 athletes from 28 countries in the Senior women's race. This is in agreement with the official numbers as published.

- Algeria (1)
- Australia (6)
- Belgium (5)
- Canada (6)
- China (5)
- Denmark (6)
- England (6)
- France (6)
- Gibraltar (6)
- Hong Kong (1)
- Ireland (6)
- Italy (5)
- Jordan (1)
- Morocco (2)
- Netherlands (4)
- New Zealand (5)
- Northern Ireland (5)
- Norway (5)
- Portugal (6)
- Romania (5)
- Scotland (6)
- Soviet Union (5)
- Spain (6)
- Sweden (2)
- Switzerland (4)
- United States (6)
- Wales (6)
- West Germany (4)

== See also ==
- 1985 IAAF World Cross Country Championships – Senior men's race
- 1985 IAAF World Cross Country Championships – Junior men's race
