= 1984 IAAF World Cross Country Championships =

- Organisers: IAAF
- Edition: 12th
- Date: March 25
- Host city: East Rutherford, New Jersey, United States
- Venue: Meadowlands Racetrack
- Events: 3
- Distances: 12.086 km – Senior men 8 km – Junior men 5 km – Senior women
- Participation: 443 athletes from 40 nations

The 1984 IAAF World Cross Country Championships was held in East Rutherford, New Jersey, United States, at the Meadowlands Racetrack on March 25, 1984. A report on the event was given in the Glasgow Herald.

Complete results for men, junior men, women, medallists, and the results of British athletes were published.

== Medallists ==
Event	Gold		Silver		Bronze	
Individual
Senior men (12.086 km)	Carlos Lopes; Portugal	33:25	Tim Hutchings; England	33:30	Steve Jones; Wales	33:32
Junior men (8 km)	Pere Casacuberta; Spain	21:32	Doju Tessema; Ethiopia	21:34	John Castellano; Canada	21:37
Senior women (5 km)	Maricica Puică; Romania	15:56	Galina Zakharova; Soviet Union	15:58	Grete Waitz; Norway	15:58
Team
Senior men	Ethiopia	134	United States	161	Portugal	223
Junior men	Ethiopia	21	Spain	34	England	68
Senior women	United States	52	England	65	New Zealand	91

== Race results ==
=== Senior men's race (12.086 km) ===
Individual race
Rank	Athlete	Country	Time
1st place, gold medalist(s)	Carlos Lopes	Portugal	33:25
2nd place, silver medalist(s)	Tim Hutchings	England	33:30
3rd place, bronze medalist(s)	Steve Jones	Wales	33:32
4	Pat Porter	United States	33:34
5	Wilson Waigwa	Kenya	33:41
6	Ed Eyestone	United States	33:46
7	Pierre Levisse	France	33:51
8	Bekele Debele	Ethiopia	33:52
9	Adugna Lema	Ethiopia	33:52
10	Francesco Panetta	Italy	33:54
11	Alberto Cova	Italy	33:58
12	Christoph Herle	West Germany	34:01
Full results

Teams
Rank	Team	Points
1st place, gold medalist(s)	Ethiopia: Bekele Debele / 8; Adugna Lema / 9; Mohammed Kedir / 16; Dereje Nedi / 24; Eshetu Tura / 31; Wodajo Bulti / 46; (Feyissa Abebe) / (96); (Hailu Wolde Tsadik) / (97); (Megersa Tulu) / (163)	134
2nd place, silver medalist(s)	United States: Pat Porter / 4; Ed Eyestone / 6; Craig Virgin / 17; John Easker / 28; Jeff Drenth / 41; Mark Stickley / 65; (John Idstrom) / (92); (Daniel Dillon) / (94); (Troy Billings) / (144)	161
3rd place, bronze medalist(s)	Portugal: Carlos Lopes / 1; Fernando Mamede / 23; Antonio Leitão / 25; João Campos / 26; Ezequiel Canario / 64; Joaquim Pinheiro / 84; (Fernando Couto) / (124); (Fernando Miguel) / (199); (João Silva) / (205)	223
4	Kenya	233
5	Italy	258
6	England	269
7	Spain	270
8	New Zealand	276
Full results

- Note: Athletes in parentheses did not score for the team result

=== Junior men's race (8 km) ===
Individual race
Rank	Athlete	Country	Time
1st place, gold medalist(s)	Pere Casacuberta	Spain	21:32
2nd place, silver medalist(s)	Doju Tessema	Ethiopia	21:34
3rd place, bronze medalist(s)	John Castellano	Canada	21:37
4	Belaye Teshome	Ethiopia	21:42
5	Antonio Pérez	Spain	21:48
6	Paul Roden	England	21:49
7	Kalcha Abcha	Ethiopia	21:49
8	Wolde Silasse Melkessa	Ethiopia	21:50
9	Robert Rice	Canada	21:53
10	David Miles	England	22:00
11	Joseba Sarriegui	Spain	22:02
12	Patrick Piper	United States	22:04
Full results

Teams
Rank	Team	Points
1st place, gold medalist(s)	Ethiopia: Doju Tessema / 2; Belaye Teshome / 4; Kalcha Abcha / 7; Wolde Silasse Melkessa / 8	21
2nd place, silver medalist(s)	Spain: Pere Casacuberta / 1; Antonio Pérez / 5; Joseba Sarriegui / 11; José Sanchez / 17; (Luis Prieto) / (25); (José Manuel García) / (39)	34
3rd place, bronze medalist(s)	England: Paul Roden / 6; David Miles / 10; Karl Palmer / 22; David Robinson / 30; (Paul Taylor) / (78); (David Dudley) / (89)	68
4	United States	72
5	Canada	101
6	Belgium	116
7	Ireland	119
8	Italy	122
Full results

- Note: Athletes in parentheses did not score for the team result

=== Senior women's race (5 km) ===
Individual race
Rank	Athlete	Country	Time
1st place, gold medalist(s)	Maricica Puică	Romania	15:56
2nd place, silver medalist(s)	Galina Zakharova	Soviet Union	15:58
3rd place, bronze medalist(s)	Grete Waitz	Norway	15:58
4	Ingrid Kristiansen	Norway	16:04
5	Jane Furniss	England	16:10
6	Christine Benning	England	16:15
7	Midde Hamrin	Sweden	16:16
8	Angela Tooby	Wales	16:18
9	Betty Springs	United States	16:20
10	Cathy Branta	United States	16:21
11	Eva Ernström	Sweden	16:21
12	Francine Peeters	Belgium	16:26
Full results

Teams
Rank	Team	Points
1st place, gold medalist(s)	United States: Betty Springs / 9; Cathy Branta / 10; Sabrina Dornhoefer / 16; Cathie Twomey / 17; (Brenda Webb) / (25); (Nan Doak) / (32)	52
2nd place, silver medalist(s)	England: Jane Furniss / 5; Christine Benning / 6; Ruth Smeeth / 15; Carole Bradford / 39; (Carol Haigh) / (54); (Julie Laughton) / (55)	65
3rd place, bronze medalist(s)	New Zealand: Dianne Rodger / 14; Mary O'Connor / 19; Christine Hughes / 27; Sue Bruce / 31; (Linden Wilde) / (50); (Sara Harnett) / (82)	91
4	Ireland	105
5	Sweden	122
6	Romania	127
7	Belgium	136
8	Norway	154
Full results

- Note: Athletes in parentheses did not score for the team result

== Medal table (unofficial) ==
* Host nation (United States)

Rank	Nation	Gold	Silver	Bronze	Total
1	Ethiopia (ETH)	2	1	0	3
2	Spain (ESP)	1	1	0	2
2	United States (USA)*	1	1	0	2
4	Portugal (POR)	1	0	1	2
5	Romania (ROU)	1	0	0	1
6	England (ENG)	0	2	1	3
7	Soviet Union (URS)	0	1	0	1
8	Canada (CAN)	0	0	1	1
8	New Zealand (NZL)	0	0	1	1
8	Norway (NOR)	0	0	1	1
8	Wales (WAL)	0	0	1	1
Totals (11 entries)		6	6	6	18

- Note: Totals include both individual and team medals, with medals in the team competition counting as one medal.

== Participation ==
An unofficial count yields the participation of 443 athletes from 40 countries. This is in agreement with the official numbers as published.

- Australia (1)
- Belgium (21)
- Canada (19)
- China (6)
- Colombia (6)
- Denmark (16)
- Dominican Republic (5)
- England (21)
- Ethiopia (13)
- Finland (8)
- France (21)
- Hong Kong (9)
- Hungary (2)
- Iceland (6)
- Ireland (18)
- Israel (1)
- Italy (21)
- Jamaica (8)
- Japan (5)
- Kenya (10)
- Kuwait (7)
- Mexico (9)
- Netherlands (7)
- New Zealand (14)
- Northern Ireland (16)
- Norway (6)
- Palestine (2)
- Portugal (20)
- Puerto Rico (11)
- Romania (5)
- Scotland (21)
- Soviet Union (8)
- Spain (21)
- Sweden (13)
- Switzerland (8)
- United States (21)
- U.S. Virgin Islands (4)
- Venezuela (2)
- Wales (21)
- West Germany (10)

== See also ==
- 1984 IAAF World Cross Country Championships – Senior men's race
- 1984 IAAF World Cross Country Championships – Junior men's race
- 1984 IAAF World Cross Country Championships – Senior women's race
- 1984 in athletics (track and field)
