= 1983 World Championships in Athletics – Women's 3000 metres =

These are the official results of the Women's 3,000 metres event at the 1983 IAAF World Championships in Helsinki, Finland. There were a total number of 26 participating athletes, with two qualifying heats and the final held on Wednesday 1983-08-10.

The final was led from start to finish by Mary Decker-Slaney, a common tactic for her in the USA, but untested at the world level. Marking her every move throughout the race was the Soviet pair of 1500 metres world record holder Tatyana Kazankina and 3000 metres world record holder Svetlana Ulmasova who expected to use their superior finishing speed. As Decker gradually increased the pace, the field stretched out to a lead pack of five, with Wendy Smith-Sly and Agnese Possamai. As the final lap approached, Sly, who ran in the USA frequently, moved to join Decker on her shoulder, while Brigitte Kraus covered the gap to join the lead pack. The Decker/Sly wall kept the Soviet runners boxed in for half a lap, but when Kraus moved on the rail, Kazankina popped free and the race was on to the finish. Coming off the final turn Kazankina looked ready to pass Decker, but she never got there as Decker found an extra gear to hold her off. Kazankina eventually slowed before the finish to be passed by a fast closing Kraus two steps before the line.

== Medalists ==
Gold	Mary Decker; United States (USA)
Silver	Brigitte Kraus; West Germany (FRG)
Bronze	Tatyana Kazankina; Soviet Union (URS)

== Records ==
Existing records at the start of the event.

World record	Svetlana Ulmasova (URS)	8:26.78	Kiev, USSR	July 25, 1982
Championship record	New event			

== Final ==
RANK	FINAL	TIME
	Mary Decker (USA)	8:34.62
	Brigitte Kraus (FRG)	8:35.11
	Tatyana Kazankina (URS)	8:35.13
4.	Svetlana Ulmasova (URS)	8:35.55
5.	Wendy Sly (GBR)	8:37.06
6.	Agnese Possamai (ITA)	8:37.96
7.	Jane Furniss (GBR)	8:45.69
8.	Natalya Artyomova (URS)	8:47.98
9.	Aurora Cunha (POR)	8:50.20
10.	Lynn Kanuka (CAN)	8:50.20
11.	Cornelia Bürki (SUI)	8:53.85
12.	Eva Ernström (SWE)	8:57.59
13.	Christine Benning (GBR)	8:58.01
14.	Lorraine Moller (NZL)	9:02.19
15.	Alison Wiley (CAN)	9:15.35

== Qualifying heats ==
- Held on Monday 1983-08-08

RANK	HEAT 1	TIME
1.	Svetlana Ulmasova (URS)	8:46.65
2.	Agnese Possamai (ITA)	8:46.68
3.	Brigitte Kraus (FRG)	8:47.25
4.	Wendy Sly (GBR)	8:47.39
5.	Christine Benning (GBR)	8:49.71
6.	Aurora Cunha (POR)	8:51.66
7.	Natalya Artyomova (URS)	8:54.14
8.	Lynn Kanuka (CAN)	8:54.61
9.	Geri Fitch (CAN)	9:01.85
10.	Monica Joyce (IRL)	9:14.83
11.	Helena Hyvonen (FIN)	9:19.65
12.	Brenda Webb (USA)	9:24.38
13.	Marcianne Mukamurenzi (RWA)	9:26.59
14.	Marit Holtklimpen (NOR)	9:43.40
15.	Khadija Al Matari (JOR)	10:49.62
	Betty Van Steenbroeck (BEL)	DNF

RANK	HEAT 2	TIME
1.	Tatyana Kazankina (URS)	8:44.72
2.	Mary Decker (USA)	8:44.72
3.	Cornelia Bürki (SUI)	8:46.94
4.	Jane Furniss (GBR)	8:48.59
5.	Alison Wiley (CAN)	8:51.27
6.	Lorraine Moller (NZL)	8:51.78
7.	Eva Ernström (SWE)	8:51.91
8.	Ivana Kleinová (TCH)	8:55.54
9.	Maggie Keyes-Kraft (USA)	9:01.97
10.	Vera Michallek (FRG)	9:04.51
11.	Marica Mršić (YUG)	9:05.59
12.	Pilar Fernández (ESP)	9:10.86
13.	Maria Radu (ROU)	9:30.37
14.	Mónica Regonessi (CHI)	9:31.95
15.	Kriscia García (ESA)	10:06.14
