= Athletics at the 1986 Commonwealth Games – Women's 3000 metres =

Women's 3000 metres at the Commonwealth Games

The women's 3000 metres event at the 1986 Commonwealth Games was held at the Meadowbank Stadium in Edinburgh on 27 July 1986.

The winning margin was 0.54 seconds which as of 2024 remains the only time the women's 3,000 metres was won by less than a second at these games. This event was discontinued after the 1994 games so this record cannot be broken.

== Results ==
Rank	Name	Nationality	Time	Notes
1st place, gold medalist(s)	Lynn Williams	Canada	8:54.29	
2nd place, silver medalist(s)	Debbie Bowker	Canada	8:54.83	
3rd place, bronze medalist(s)	Yvonne Murray	Scotland	8:55.32	
4	Chris Benning	England	9:03.45	
5	Lorraine Moller	New Zealand	9:03.89	
6	Christine Pfitzinger	New Zealand	9:09.35	
7	Jane Shields	England	9:13.65	
8	Wendy Sly	England	9:14.04	
9	Marsela Robertson	Scotland	9:51.33	
