= Sue Bruce =

New Zealand female distance runner

Personal information
- Born: 23 July 1964 (age 61)

Sport
- Country: New Zealand
- Sport: Athletics
- Event(s): Cross country running, 100 kilometres
Medal record
World Cross Country Championships
Silver medal – second place	1986 Colombier	Team
Bronze medal – third place	1984 East Rutherford	Team

Sue Bruce (born 25 July 1964) is a New Zealand former middle-distance runner who competed mainly in cross country running and track. She ran for New Zealand at five straight editions of the IAAF World Cross Country Championships from 1983 to 1987. She shared in the team silver medal at the 1986 race alongside Christine McMiken, Gail Rear, Mary O'Connor and Wendy Renner, and was a team bronze medallist at the 1984 race with Dianne Rodger, O'Connor, and Christine Hughes. Her best individual finish was eighth place in 1985.

Bruce won the 3000 metres title at the New Zealand Athletics Championships in 1985, her sole national title at the competition.

== International competitions ==
Year	Competition	Venue	Position	Event	Notes
1983	World Cross Country Championships	Gateshead, United Kingdom	27th	Senior race	14:26
1983	World Cross Country Championships	Gateshead, United Kingdom	6th	Team	122 pts
1984	World Cross Country Championships	East Rutherford, United States	31st	Senior race	16:45
1984	World Cross Country Championships	East Rutherford, United States	3rd	Team	91 pts
1985	World Cross Country Championships	Lisbon, Portugal	8th	Senior race	15:42
1985	World Cross Country Championships	Lisbon, Portugal	7th	Team	144 pts
1986	World Cross Country Championships	Colombier, Switzerland	32nd	Senior race	15:40.6
1986	World Cross Country Championships	Colombier, Switzerland	2nd	Team	67 pts
1987	World Cross Country Championships	Warsaw, Poland	82nd	Senior race	18:13
1987	World Cross Country Championships	Warsaw, Poland	11th	Team	205 pts

== National titles ==
- New Zealand Athletics Championships
  - 3000 m: 1985
