= Kirsti Voldnes =

Norwegian middle-distance runner

Kirsti Voldnes, married Løvnes (born 10 July 1963) is a retired Norwegian middle distance runner.

She finished eleventh in the 1500 metres at the 1979 European Junior Championships, sixth in the 800 metres at the 1980 European Indoor Championships and won the bronze medal in the 1500 metres at the 1981 European Junior Championships. She also competed at the 1981 European Indoor Championships without reaching the final. At the 1984 World Cross Country Championships she finished 75th in the individual competition and 8th in the team competition.

Voldnes competed for the Nebraska Cornhuskers track and field team in the NCAA. She later competed for the Clemson Tigers track and field team in the NCAA, placing 3rd in the 1500 m at the 1985 NCAA Division I Indoor Track and Field Championships.

Voldnes became Norwegian 800 metres champion in 1980, won the silver medal in 1981 and bronze medals in 1979 and 1983. She represented the club IK Våg. Her main competitor was Randi Langøigjelten. She is the mother of steeplechase runner Ingeborg Løvnes. In 2016, Ingeborg Løvnes won her first national championship, equalling her mother who also took one title.
