= 1984 IAAF World Cross Country Championships – Junior men's race =

Junior men's race at the 1984 IAAF World Cross Country Championships
- Organisers: IAAF
- Edition: 12th
- Date: March 25
- Host city: East Rutherford, New Jersey, United States
- Venue: Meadowlands Racetrack
- Events: 1
- Distances: 8 km – Junior men
- Participation: 94 athletes from 22 nations

The Junior men's race at the 1984 IAAF World Cross Country Championships was held in East Rutherford, New Jersey, United States, at the Meadowlands Racetrack on March 25, 1984. A report on the event was given in the Glasgow Herald.

Complete results, medallists, and the results of British athletes were published.

== Race results ==
=== Junior men's race (8 km) ===
==== Individual ====
Rank	Athlete	Country	Time
1st place, gold medalist(s)	Pere Casacuberta	Spain	21:32
2nd place, silver medalist(s)	Doju Tessema	Ethiopia	21:34
3rd place, bronze medalist(s)	John Castellano	Canada	21:37
4	Belaye Teshome	Ethiopia	21:42
5	Antonio Pérez	Spain	21:48
6	Paul Roden	England	21:49
7	Kalcha Abcha	Ethiopia	21:49
8	Wolde Silasse Melkessa	Ethiopia	21:50
9	Robert Rice	Canada	21:53
10	David Miles	England	22:00
11	Joseba Sarriegui	Spain	22:02
12	Patrick Piper	United States	22:04
13	Nikolay Matyushenko	Soviet Union	22:05
14	Jo Slagmolen	Belgium	22:06
15	Enda Fitzpatrick	Ireland	22:06
16	Simon Gutierrez	United States	22:07
17	José Sanchez	Spain	22:10
18	Walter Merlo	Italy	22:11
19	Samuel Okemwa	Kenya	22:11
20	Bobby Quinn	Scotland	22:11
21	Ronald Harris	United States	22:16
22	Karl Palmer	England	22:16
23	Dan Foley	United States	22:17
24	Peter Govaerts	Belgium	22:18
25	Luis Prieto	Spain	22:18
26	Seamus McCann	Northern Ireland	22:18
27	Edward Hanratty	Ireland	22:19
28	Carlos Monteiro	Portugal	22:20
29	Dennis Cullinane	United States	22:23
30	David Robinson	England	22:23
31	Valentinas Patapas	Soviet Union	22:23
32	Luigi Falvo	Italy	22:28
33	Glenn Charanduk	Canada	22:33
34	Brian Hayes	Ireland	22:34
35	Paolo Tagliapietra	Italy	22:34
36	Pascal Fressard	France	22:35
37	Angelo Brunetti	Italy	22:35
38	Peter Van de Kerkhove	Belgium	22:36
39	José Manuel García	Spain	22:36
40	Arnold van Heesvelde	Belgium	22:36
41	Aleksandr Burtsev	Soviet Union	22:38
42	Massimo Della Pietra	Italy	22:39
43	Trevor Sargent	Ireland	22:42
44	Johan Gillis	Belgium	22:42
45	Dale Rixon	Wales	22:42
46	Neil Horsfield	Wales	22:43
47	Ben Bebognies	Belgium	22:44
48	William Mangan	United States	22:44
49	Mauro Grigorio	Italy	22:44
50	Christian Vagner	France	22:45
51	Patrick Lonjou	France	22:46
52	José Azevedo	Portugal	22:47
53	Vladimir Kolpakov	Soviet Union	22:47
54	Antonio Peira	Portugal	22:49
55	Steve Marshall	Scotland	22:50
56	Scott McDonald	Canada	22:50
57	Vladimir Turbakov	Soviet Union	22:51
58	Cari Bessai	Canada	22:51
59	Paul Williams	Wales	22:52
60	Remy Rampteau	France	22:52
61	Andrew Rodgers	Wales	22:54
62	Bernd Bürger	West Germany	22:58
63	Michael Lewis	Wales	23:00
64	James Orr	Scotland	23:01
65	Mark Wood	Canada	23:02
66	Steve Begen	Scotland	23:04
67	Nazar Habib	Wales	23:12
68	Saïd Aballache	France	23:12
69	Joao Valente	Portugal	23:13
70	Antonio Resende	Portugal	23:15
71	Philip Tweedie	Northern Ireland	23:20
72	Juan Isaais Leon	Dominican Republic	23:22
73	Edwin Cruz	Puerto Rico	23:22
74	Orlando Santiago	Puerto Rico	23:23
75	Lars Bang Nielsen	Denmark	23:26
76	David McShane	Scotland	23:29
77	Rui Moreira	Portugal	23:30
78	Paul Taylor	England	23:37
79	Antonio Ortiz	Puerto Rico	23:38
80	Beat Nyffenegger	Switzerland	23:41
81	Gerry Conway	Northern Ireland	23:42
82	Walter Maldonado	Puerto Rico	23:44
83	Markus Schoni	Switzerland	23:49
84	Ciaran Rogan	Northern Ireland	23:52
85	Jesper Mathiesen	Denmark	23:53
86	Bertrand Itsweire	France	23:54
87	Mark Keller	Ireland	23:56
88	Paul Rodgers	Northern Ireland	23:59
89	David Dudley	England	24:02
90	Alastair Currie	Scotland	24:06
91	Ramon Ortero	Puerto Rico	24:12
92	Ahmed Al-Said	Palestine	24:42
93	Manahy Falah Al-Azhni	Kuwait	24:50
94	H.Tareq Khalifa	Kuwait	25:26

==== Teams ====
Rank	Team	Points
1st place, gold medalist(s)	Ethiopia: Doju Tessema / 2; Belaye Teshome / 4; Kalcha Abcha / 7; Wolde Silasse Melkessa / 8	21
2nd place, silver medalist(s)	Spain: Pere Casacuberta / 1; Antonio Pérez / 5; Joseba Sarriegui / 11; José Sanchez / 17; (Luis Prieto) / (25); (José Manuel García) / (39)	34
3rd place, bronze medalist(s)	England: Paul Roden / 6; David Miles / 10; Karl Palmer / 22; David Robinson / 30; (Paul Taylor) / (78); (David Dudley) / (89)	68
4	United States: Patrick Piper / 12; Simon Gutierrez / 16; Ronald Harris / 21; Dan Foley / 23; (Dennis Cullinane) / (29); (William Mangan) / (48)	72
5	Canada: John Castellano / 3; Robert Rice / 9; Glenn Charanduk / 33; Scott McDonald / 56; (Cari Bessai) / (58); (Mark Wood) / (65)	101
6	Belgium: Jo Slagmolen / 14; Peter Govaerts / 24; Peter Van de Kerkhove / 38; Arnold van Heesvelde / 40; (Johan Gillis) / (44); (Ben Debognies) / (47)	116
7	Ireland: Enda Fitzpatrick / 15; Edward Hanratty / 27; Brian Hayes / 34; Trevor Sargent / 43; (Mark Keller) / (87)	119
8	Italy: Walter Merlo / 18; Luigi Falvo / 32; Paolo Tagliapietra / 35; Angelo Brunetti / 37; (Massimo Della Pietra) / (42); (Mauro Grigorio) / (49)	122
9	Soviet Union: Nikolay Matyushenko / 13; Valentinas Patapas / 31; Aleksandr Burtsev / 41; Vladimir Kolpakov / 53; (Vladimir Turbakov) / (57)	138
10	France: Pascal Fressard / 36; Christian Vagner / 50; Patrick Lonjou / 51; Remy Rampteau / 60; (Saïd Aballache) / (68); (Bertrand Itsweire) / (86)	197
11	Portugal: Carlos Monteiro / 28; José Azevedo / 52; Antonio Peira / 54; Joao Valente / 69; (Antonio Resende) / (70); (Rui Moreira) / (77)	203
12	Scotland: Bobby Quinn / 20; Steve Marshall / 55; James Orr / 64; Steve Begen / 66; (David McShane) / (76); (Alastair Currie) / (90)	205
13	Wales: Dale Rixon / 45; Neil Horsfield / 46; Paul Williams / 59; Andrew Rodgers / 61; (Michael Lewis) / (63); (Nazar Habib) / (67)	211
14	Northern Ireland: Seamus McCann / 26; Philip Tweedie / 71; Gerry Conway / 81; Ciaran Rogan / 84; (Paul Rodgers) / (88)	262
15	Puerto Rico: Edwin Cruz / 73; Orlando Santiago / 74; Antonio Ortiz / 79; Walter Maldonado / 82; (Ramon Ortero) / (91)	308

- Note: Athletes in parentheses did not score for the team result

== Participation ==
An unofficial count yields the participation of 94 athletes from 22 countries in the Junior men's race. This is in agreement with the official numbers as published.

- Belgium (6)
- Canada (6)
- Denmark (2)
- Dominican Republic (1)
- England (6)
- Ethiopia (4)
- France (6)
- Ireland (5)
- Italy (6)
- Kenya (1)
- Kuwait (2)
- Northern Ireland (5)
- Palestine (1)
- Portugal (6)
- Puerto Rico (5)
- Scotland (6)
- Soviet Union (5)
- Spain (6)
- Switzerland (2)
- United States (6)
- Wales (6)
- West Germany (1)

== See also ==
- 1984 IAAF World Cross Country Championships – Senior men's race
- 1984 IAAF World Cross Country Championships – Senior women's race
