= Galina Zakharova (runner) =

Russian former long-distance runner (born 1956)

Medal record

Women's athletics

Representing the Soviet Union

IAAF World Cross Country Championships
Silver medal – second place	1984 East Rutherford	Senior race

Galina Zakharova (Russian: Галина Захарова; born 7 September 1956) is a Russian former long-distance runner who represented the Soviet Union. Her greatest success came at the IAAF World Cross Country Championships where she was the silver medallist in 1984 close behind winner Maricica Puică. She also won a team title with the Soviet women (Yelena Sipatova, Raisa Smekhnova, Tatyana Pozdnyakova) at the 1982 edition, having finished 18th.

She also competed on the track and was the 1984 Soviet champion over 3000 metres. She ranked third in the world for the 1983 in that event courtesy of a run of 8:34.60 minutes. She also ranked in the top five for the season in 1982 over 3000 m and again in 1984 over 1500 metres (setting a lifetime best of 3.57.72 minutes). Prior to her success over shorter distances, she recorded a marathon best of 2:46:48 hours in Moscow in 1981.

== Personal bests ==
- 800 metres – 1:57.08 min (1984)
- 1500 metres – 3:57.72 min (1984)
- 3000 metres – 8:33.40 min (1982)
- 10,000 metres – 31:15.00 min (1984)
- Marathon – 2:46:48 hours (1981)

All info from IAAF profile

== International competitions ==
Year	Competition	Venue	Position	Event	Notes
1982	World Cross Country Championships	Rome, Italy	18th	Senior race	15:08.8
1982	World Cross Country Championships	Rome, Italy	1st	Senior team	44 pts
1984	World Cross Country Championships	East Rutherford, United States	2nd	Senior race	15:58

== National titles ==
- Soviet Athletics Championships
  - 3000 metres: 1984
