= 1982 IAAF World Cross Country Championships =

- Organisers: IAAF
- Edition: 10th
- Date: March 21
- Host city: Rome, Italy
- Venue: Ippodromo delle Capannelle
- Events: 3
- Distances: 11.978 km – Senior men 7.926 km – Junior men 4.663 km – Senior women
- Participation: 382 athletes from 33 nations

The 1982 IAAF World Cross Country Championships was held in Rome, Italy, at the Ippodromo delle Capannelle on March 21, 1982. A report on the event was given in the Glasgow Herald.

Complete results for men, junior men, women, medallists, and the results of British athletes were published. In the senior men's competition, two-time defending champion Craig Virgin had traveled to Rome to defend his title, but was unable to race. On the day before the contest, was sent to the hospital by ambulance, where he was hospitalized for six days with a swollen kidney and a massive urinary tract infection. Doctors ultimately decided against removal of Virgin's right kidney, although the kidney was later removed in 1994.

== Medallists ==
Event	Gold		Silver		Bronze	
Individual
Senior men (11.978 km)	Mohammed Kedir; Ethiopia	33:40.5	Alberto Salazar; United States	33:44.8	Rod Dixon; New Zealand	34:01.8
Junior men (7.926 km)	Zurbachev Gelaw; Ethiopia	22:45.3	Adugna Lema; Ethiopia	22:46.6	Stefano Mei; Italy	22:48.7
Senior women (4.663 km)	Maricica Puică; Romania	14:38.9	Fiţa Lovin; Romania	14:40.5	Grete Waitz; Norway	14:43.9
Team
Senior men	Ethiopia	98	England	114	Soviet Union	257
Junior men	Ethiopia	12	Italy	37	United States	70
Senior women	Soviet Union	44	Italy	57	England	67

== Race results ==
=== Senior men's race (11.978 km) ===
Individual race
Rank	Athlete	Country	Time
1st place, gold medalist(s)	Mohammed Kedir	Ethiopia	33:40.5
2nd place, silver medalist(s)	Alberto Salazar	United States	33:44.8
3rd place, bronze medalist(s)	Rod Dixon	New Zealand	34:01.8
4	Hansjörg Kunze	East Germany	34:03
5	Mike McLeod	England	34:06.4
6	Eshetu Tura	Ethiopia	34:07.7
7	Alberto Cova	Italy	34:12.8
8	Werner Schildhauer	East Germany	34:17.1
9	Dave Clarke	England	34:19.4
10	Rob de Castella	Australia	34:20.5
11	Hugh Jones	England	34:21
12	Wodajo Bulti	Ethiopia	34:28.5
Full results

Teams
Rank	Team	Points
1st place, gold medalist(s)	Ethiopia: Mohammed Kedir / 1; Eshetu Tura / 6; Wodajo Bulti / 12; Miruts Yifter / 16; Hana Girma / 28; Dereje Nedi / 35; (Girma Berhanu) / (66); (Megersa Tulu) / (137)	98
2nd place, silver medalist(s)	England: Mike McLeod / 5; Dave Clarke / 9; Hugh Jones / 11; Julian Goater / 18; Steve Kenyon / 22; Karl Harrison / 49; (Barry Knight) / (65); (Kevin Forster) / (67); (Peter Standing) / (124)	114
3rd place, bronze medalist(s)	Soviet Union: Aleksandr Antipov / 19; Valeriy Sapon / 24; Enn Sellik / 45; Viktor Chumakov / 46; Yevgeniy Okorokov / 52; Toomas Turb / 71; (Sergey Navolokin) / (83); (Igor Yefimov) / (114)	257
4	Kenya	271
5	Spain	280
6	United States	300
7	Portugal	328
8	West Germany	330
Full results

- Note: Athletes in parentheses did not score for the team result

=== Junior men's race (7.926 km) ===
Individual race
Rank	Athlete	Country	Time
1st place, gold medalist(s)	Zurbachev Gelaw	Ethiopia	22:45.3
2nd place, silver medalist(s)	Adugna Lema	Ethiopia	22:46.6
3rd place, bronze medalist(s)	Stefano Mei	Italy	22:48.7
4	Hunde Kume	Ethiopia	22:50.5
5	Teka Mekonnen	Ethiopia	22:56.2
6	Francesco Panetta	Italy	23:08.4
7	Salvatore Nicosia	Italy	23:09.2
8	Jonathan Richards	England	23:11.4
9	Gonfa Negere	Ethiopia	23:14.3
10	Bekele Debele	Ethiopia	23:19.7
11	John Easker	United States	23:25
12	Francisco Espejo	Spain	23:29.7
Full results

Teams
Rank	Team	Points
1st place, gold medalist(s)	Ethiopia: Zurbachev Gelaw / 1; Adugna Lema / 2; Hunde Kume / 4; Teka Mekonnen / 5; (Gonfa Negere) / (9); (Bekele Debele) / (10)	12
2nd place, silver medalist(s)	Italy: Stefano Mei / 3; Francesco Panetta / 6; Salvatore Nicosia / 7; Ranieri Carenza / 21; (Sergio Bruni) / (39); (Marco Gozzano) / (58)	37
3rd place, bronze medalist(s)	United States: John Easker / 11; Tom Ansberry / 14; George Nicholas / 22; Joe Stinzi / 23; (Jonathan Knight) / (46); (Mike Kubitschek) / (56)	70
4	Spain	72
5	Canada	95
6	England	100
7	Morocco	138
8	Soviet Union	146
Full results

- Note: Athletes in parentheses did not score for the team result

=== Senior women's race (4.663 km) ===
Individual race
Rank	Athlete	Country	Time
1st place, gold medalist(s)	Maricica Puică	Romania	14:38.9
2nd place, silver medalist(s)	Fiţa Lovin	Romania	14:40.5
3rd place, bronze medalist(s)	Grete Waitz	Norway	14:43.9
4	Agnese Possamai	Italy	14:46.9
5	Dianne Rodger	New Zealand	14:49.2
6	Ingrid Kristiansen	Norway	14:50.9
7	Yelena Sipatova	Soviet Union	14:51.9
8	Raisa Smekhnova	Soviet Union	14:55.5
9	Nadia Dandolo	Italy	14:57.9
10	Jan Merrill	United States	14:59.5
11	Tatyana Pozdnyakova	Soviet Union	15:00.1
12	Kate Wiley	Canada	15:01
Full results

Teams
Rank	Team	Points
1st place, gold medalist(s)	Soviet Union: Yelena Sipatova / 7; Raisa Smekhnova / 8; Tatyana Pozdnyakova / 11; Galina Zakharova / 18; (Alla Yushina) / (29)	44
2nd place, silver medalist(s)	Italy: Agnese Possamai / 4; Nadia Dandolo / 9; Cristina Tomasini / 19; Rita Marchisio / 25; (Margherita Gargano) / (35); (Gabriella Dorio) / ((DNF))	57
3rd place, bronze medalist(s)	England: Ann Ford / 13; Paula Fudge / 14; Jane Furniss / 16; Ruth Smeeth / 24; (Christina Boxer) / (41); (Sandra Arthurton) / (48)	67
4	United States	70
5	Canada	104
6	Norway	126
7	Spain	132
8	France	158
Full results

- Note: Athletes in parentheses did not score for the team result

== Medal table (unofficial) ==
* Host nation (Italy)

Rank	Nation	Gold	Silver	Bronze	Total
1	Ethiopia (ETH)	4	1	0	5
2	Romania (ROU)	1	1	0	2
3	Soviet Union (URS)	1	0	1	2
4	Italy (ITA)*	0	2	1	3
5	England (ENG)	0	1	1	2
5	United States (USA)	0	1	1	2
7	New Zealand (NZL)	0	0	1	1
7	Norway (NOR)	0	0	1	1
Totals (8 entries)		6	6	6	18

- Note: Totals include both individual and team medals, with medals in the team competition counting as one medal.

== Participation ==
An unofficial count yields the participation of 382 athletes from 33 countries. This is in agreement with the official numbers as published.

- Algeria (20)
- Australia (1)
- Belgium (19)
- Canada (21)
- Czechoslovakia (2)
- Denmark (16)
- East Germany (3)
- England (21)
- Ethiopia (14)
- France (21)
- Ireland (20)
- Israel (3)
- Italy (20)
- Kenya (9)
- Kuwait (1)
- Lebanon (2)
- Mexico (1)
- Morocco (6)
- Netherlands (6)
- New Zealand (4)
- Northern Ireland (11)
- Norway (4)
- Poland (6)
- Portugal (21)
- Romania (2)
- Scotland (21)
- Soviet Union (17)
- Spain (21)
- Sweden (15)
- Switzerland (6)
- United States (21)
- Wales (20)
- West Germany (7)

== See also ==
- 1982 IAAF World Cross Country Championships – Senior men's race
- 1982 IAAF World Cross Country Championships – Junior men's race
- 1982 IAAF World Cross Country Championships – Senior women's race
- 1982 in athletics (track and field)
