= Alison Wiley =

Canadian long-distance runner

Personal information
- Born: 11 October 1963 (age 62) Toronto, Canada

Sport
- Sport: Cross-country running Middle distance running
Medal record
Representing Canada
World Cross Country Championships
Silver medal – second place	1983 Gateshead	Senior race
Bronze medal – third place	1983 Gateshead	Senior team

Alison Wiley Rochon (born 11 October 1963) is a Canadian former long-distance runner. She was a World Cross Country runner-up in 1983.

Wiley attended Stanford University and competed collegiately for the Stanford Cardinal track and field team. She was the 1983 winner of the NCAA Division I Outdoor Championship title in the 3000 metres. She won seven NCAA All-American honours, which included a runner-up spot in the 1984 NCAA 5000 metres and three straight second-place finishes at the NCAA Women's Division I Cross Country Championship from 1982 to 1984. She was inducted into the Stanford Cardinal hall of fame in 2006.

Internationally, her greatest success was at the 1983 IAAF World Cross Country Championships where she became Canada's first ever medallist at the competition, taking the silver medal behind Norway's Grete Waitz. As a result, she also led the Canadian women's team to the bronze medals. She also competed at the 1983 World Championships in Athletics that year, coming 15th in the 3000 metres, and participated at the 1981 IAAF World Cross Country Championships. Her sole other international medal was a 3000 m bronze medal at the 1989 Jeux de la Francophonie, finishing a fraction of a second behind Rwanda's Marcianne Mukamurenzi.

She was twice a winner at the Canadian Track and Field Championships, taking the 3000 m title in 1981 and 1988.

== International competitions ==
Year	Competition	Venue	Position	Event	Notes
1981	World Cross Country Championships	Madrid, Spain	61st	Senior race	15:32
1983	World Cross Country Championships	Gateshead, United Kingdom	2nd	Senior race	13:37
1983	World Cross Country Championships	Gateshead, United Kingdom	3rd	Senior team	53 pts
1983	World Championships	Helsinki, Finland	15th	3000 m	9:15.35
1989	Francophonie Games	Casablanca, Morocco	3rd	3000 m	9:10.76

== National titles ==
- Canadian Track and Field Championships
  - 3000 metres: 1981, 1988
