= Steve Jones (runner) =

Welsh runner (born 1955)

Steve Jones MBE
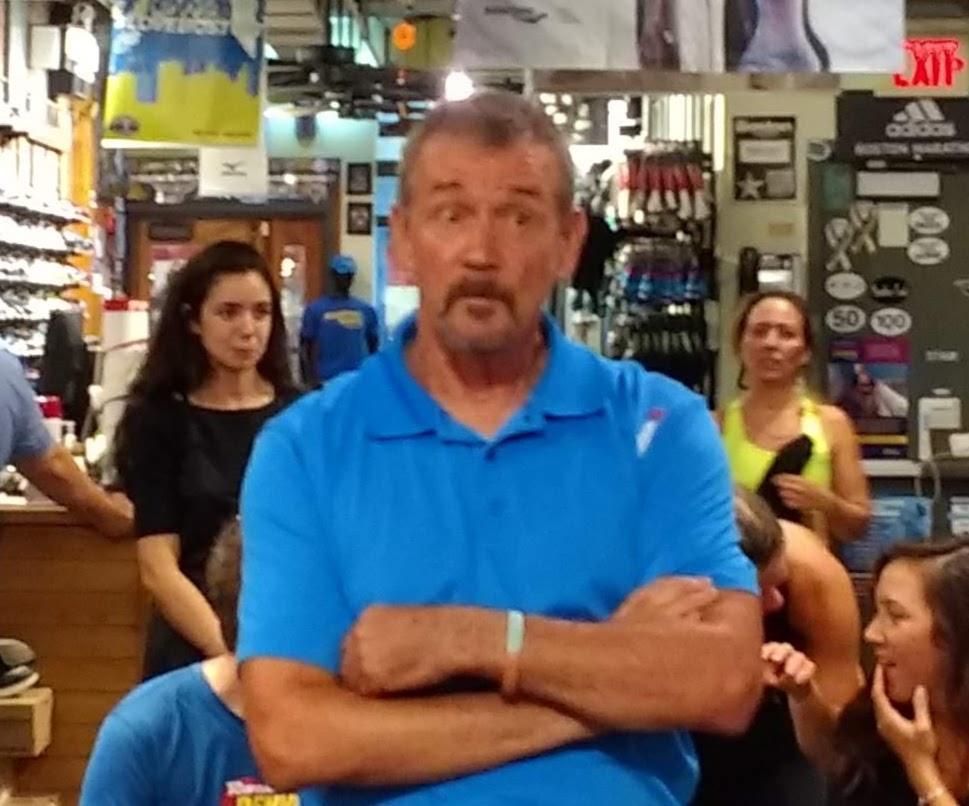
- Steve Jones speaking to a running group in Boston, August 2018

Personal information
- Nationality: Welsh
- Born: 4 August 1955 (age 71) Tredegar, Wales
- Height: 5 ft 10 in (1.78 m)
- Weight: 137 lb (62 kg)

Sport
- Sport: Athletics
- Events: 10,000 m, Marathon
- Club: Newport Harriers, RAF

Achievements and titles
- Olympic finals: 1984; 10,000 m, 8th
- World finals: 1983; 10,000 m, 12th 1993; Marathon, 13th
- Personal bests: 5000 m: 13:18.6 (Lisbon 1982); 10,000 m: 27:39.14 (Oslo 1983); Half marathon: 60:59 (South Shields 1986); Marathon: 2:07:13 (Chicago 1985)
Medal record
Men's athletics
Representing Wales
World Cross Country Championships
Bronze medal – third place	1984 New York	Long race
Commonwealth Games
Bronze medal – third place	1986 Edinburgh	10,000 m
Marathon
Gold medal – first place	1984 Chicago	Marathon
Gold medal – first place	1985 London	Marathon
Gold medal – first place	1985 Chicago	Marathon
Silver medal – second place	1987 Boston	Marathon
Gold medal – first place	1988 New York	Marathon

Stephen Henry Jones MBE (born 4 August 1955) is a Welsh former athlete who set the world record in the marathon in his first completed race at that distance at the Chicago Marathon in 1984, with a time of 2:08:05.

== Biography ==
Jones grew up in Ebbw Vale, and ran his first race at the age of 15 as a member of the Air Training Corps. Dissatisfied with working in a factory as a sewing-machine mechanic, he became an aircraft technician for the Royal Air Force (RAF) in 1974, and joined the RAF's running team in 1976.

Jones was on the podium three times as the British AAA Championships from 1980 to 1982 before becoming the British 10,000 metres champion after winning the British AAA Championship title at the 1984 AAA Championships.

After receiving an invitation to the 1983 Chicago Marathon Jones began training for that distance; he previously had specialized in the 5,000 and 10,000 m, and on 6 August 1984, he ran the 1984 Olympic 10,000 m event. He finished 8th with a time of 28:28.08.

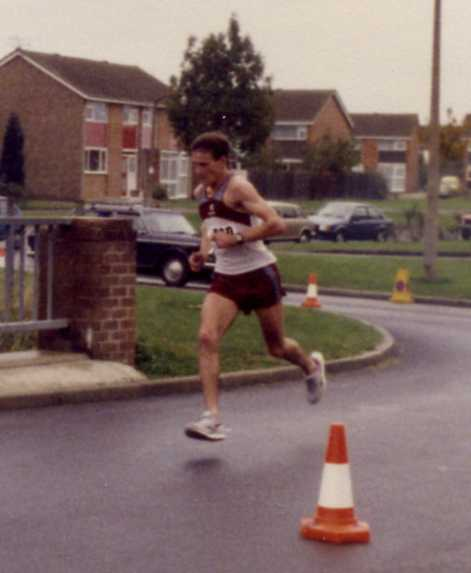
Steve Jones winning the Swindon (UK) Half Marathon in October 1984

On 21 October 1984, a year after he had dropped out of the Chicago Marathon because of an injury, Jones won the event—his first completed marathon—with a time of 2:08:05, breaking the world record of Australian Robert de Castella by 13 seconds. Jones was unaware of the record and, since he never wore a watch, did not know that he might break it until two miles before the finish. He won the 1985 London Marathon in 2:08:16 despite stopping to go to the toilet during the event; Jones later said, "I didn't even train for [the race]", instead continuing to coach himself. Aware that he was "one hamstring tear away from oblivion", Jones remained with the RAF despite earning large sums per race. In August 1985, he broke the world record for the half marathon, running 61:14 in Birmingham. On 20 October of that year he achieved his personal best marathon time of 2:07:13 in winning the Chicago Marathon, only one second slower than the world record run by Carlos Lopes at the Rotterdam Marathon earlier that same year. This time was the fastest of any British runner for 33 years until Mo Farah beat it in 2018.

In 1986, he won a bronze medal in the 10,000 m at the Commonwealth Games. In the European Championships shortly after, he once again competed in the marathon. Leading from the start and breaking away from the pack, Jones ran a brilliant race up to the 20-mile mark. At that point he was leading by over two minutes and on schedule for another world record. However, he then "hit the wall" and suffered terribly in the final six miles. He slowed to a virtual shuffle, but refused to quit as he watched other competitors catch and pass him. Two years later, in the 1988 New York City Marathon, Jones won by over three minutes with a time of 2:08:20.

He was the first Welsh athlete to appear on the cover of the running magazine Running Times.

Jones was appointed a Member of the Order of the British Empire (MBE) in the 2019 Birthday Honours for services to sport.

September 2025 a steel statue of Jones was unveiled outside Ebbw Vale Leisure Centre.

Jones lives in Boulder, Colorado.

== Achievements ==
Year	Competition	Venue	Position	Event	Notes
Representing Great Britain and Wales
1983	World Championships	Helsinki, Finland	12th	10,000 m	28:15.03
1983	Chicago Marathon	Chicago, United States	DNF	Marathon	—
1984	World Cross Country Championships	New York, United States	3rd	Senior race	33:32
1984	Olympic Games	Los Angeles, United States	8th	10,000 m	28:28.08
1984	Chicago Marathon	Chicago, United States	1st	Marathon	2:08:05 WR
1985	London Marathon	London, United Kingdom	1st	Marathon	2:08:16 CR
1985	Chicago Marathon	Chicago, United States	1st	Marathon	2:07:13 CR/NR
1986	European Championships	Stuttgart, West Germany	20th	Marathon	2:22:12
1986	Commonwealth Games	Edinburgh, Scotland	3rd	10,000 m	28:02.48
1987	Boston Marathon	Boston, United States	2nd	Marathon	2:12:37
1988	New York City Marathon	New York, United States	1st	Marathon	2:08:20 CR
1990	Commonwealth Games	Auckland, New Zealand	4th	Marathon	2:12:44
1992	Toronto Shoppers Drug Mart Marathon	Toronto, Canada	1st	Marathon	2:10:06
1993	World Championships	Stuttgart, Germany	13th	Marathon	2:20:04

== Popular culture ==
In 2010, a video of Jones overtaking Tanzanian athlete Gidamis Shahanga in the closing 80 metres of a 10000-metre race went viral. The video has been featured in collections of "inspirational sports moments" or "remarkable comebacks".

In the race, Jones was leading from the start with 30-metre margins up until the last 400 metres, at which point commentator David Coleman noted "But they are closing. And of course he [Jones] has got very little finishing speed". With 200 metres remaining, Jones glimpsed back and saw Shahanga, with Coleman saying "Jones looking for trouble and the trouble is there". Shahanga caught Jones with 110 metres remaining, Coleman saying "the African is going to steal the race in the last 80 metres", but Jones fought back, accelerated, and won the race in a time of 27:55.2.

The race was an invitational held in Memorial Van Damme Stadium, Brussels, 1983, and hence not recognised in official competitive records.

Records
Preceded by (Australia) Robert De Castella	Men's Marathon World Record Holder; 21 October 1984 – 20 April 1985	Succeeded by (Portugal) Carlos Lopes
