= Rod Dixon =

New Zealand distance runner

Rod Dixon ONZM
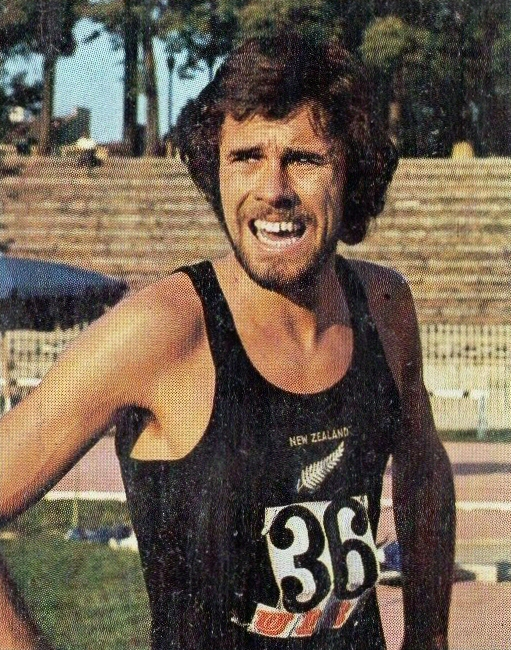
- Dixon in 1976

Personal information
- Full name: Rodney Phillip Mathew Dixon
- Born: 13 July 1950 (age 76) Nelson, New Zealand

Sport
- Country: New Zealand
- Sport: Track and field

Achievements and titles
- National finals: 1500 m champion (1978); 5000 m champion (1978, 1979, 1980, 1981); 10,000 m champion (1981)

Rodney Phillip Mathew Dixon ONZM (born 13 July 1950) is a former New Zealand middle- to long-distance runner. He won the bronze medal in the 1500 metres at the 1972 Olympics in Munich, and in 1983 won the New York City Marathon.

== Biography ==
Dixon was born on 13 July 1950 in Nelson, New Zealand.

He first represented New Zealand at the 1972 Summer Olympics in Munich, finishing third in the 1500 metres. He won his first British AAA Championships title in the 1500m event at the 1973 AAA Championships (the second was in 1976). At the 1974 British Commonwealth Games in Christchurch he finished fourth in the 1500 metres. His time of 3:33.89 (officially 3:33.9) was the fifth fastest ever at the time and remained Dixon's lifetime best for the distance. He then moved up to the 5000 metres and was ranked first in the world for the event in 1975 by Track & Field News magazine.

In the 5000 metres at the 1976 Montreal Olympics Dixon finished fourth behind four-time Olympic Champion Lasse Virén, teammate Dick Quax and Klaus-Peter Hildenbrand whose last second dive/fall denied Dixon a second Olympic bronze medal.

After missing the 1980 Summer Olympics due to the boycott Dixon took third place at the 1982 IAAF World Cross Country Championships. Dixon also turned to road-running and was one of the more successful athletes on the US road racing circuit in the early '80s, including wins at the Falmouth Road Race (1980), Bay to Breakers (1982 & 1983), the Lynchburg, Virginia 10 Miler (1980, 1981 & 1983), and the Philadelphia Half-Marathon (1980, 1981). His gradual move to longer distances culminated in his 1983 marathon victory in New York City. He finished 10th in the marathon at the 1984 Summer Olympics.

Unable to compete due to an injury, Dixon guided a blind runner in the 1985 Bay to Breakers. At the 1985 New York Marathon, Dixon served as the first host for the participatory "Helmet Cam" as he followed the lead pack for a mile during the race.

The boycott of the 1980 Summer Olympics led to Dixon becoming embroiled in a savage row with the NZ Amateur Athletic Association. He got wind of the boycott some time before it was announced and confronted NZAAA over it. Teams which were to compete in the coming Olympics were in their final preparations and some athletes in teams, like the rowers and hockey players, were leaving their jobs so they could compete -without any idea that there would be a boycott. Dixon felt that the New Zealand government had no business meddling in the Olympic Games and the athletes should have been consulted and been part of the decision-making process. This rift led to Dixon relocating to the US to compete on the road racing circuit.

After winning the New York Marathon, Pan Am put his name on the side of one of its 747s and gave him a "self-write ticket" - for first-class. He used to say to his "friend": Want to go to Zurich tonight? And off they'd go, for dinner.

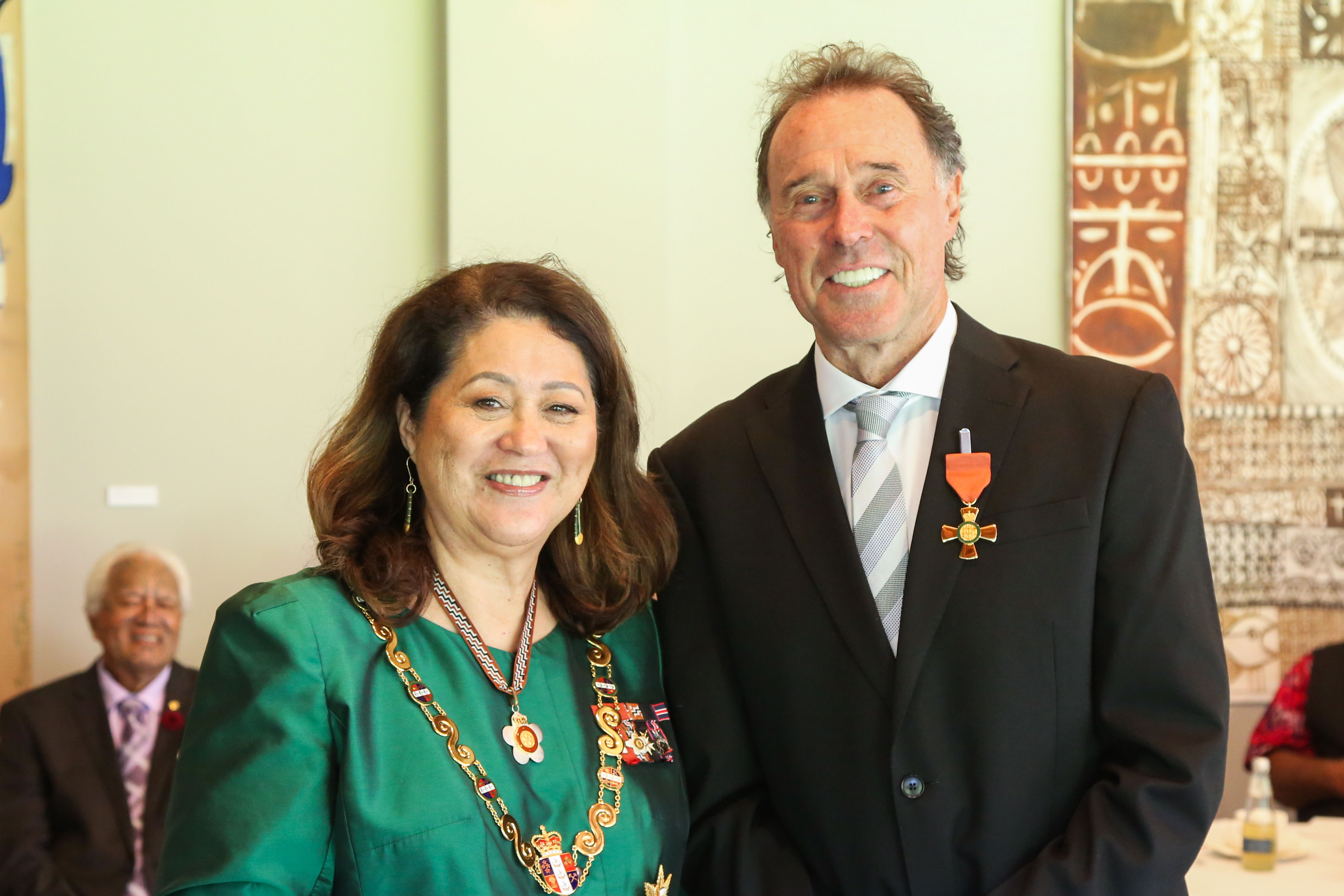
Dixon (right), after his investiture as an Officer of the New Zealand Order of Merit by the governor-general, Dame Cindy Kiro, at Government House, Auckland, on 9 April 2026

In the 2026 New Year Honours, Dixon was appointed an Officer of the New Zealand Order of Merit, for services to athletics.

== Personal bests ==
Distance	Time	Place	Date
800 m	1:47.6	Rome	1973
1500 m	3:33.89	Christchurch	1974
1 mile	3:53.62	Stockholm	1975
3000m	7:41.0	Milan	1974
3000 m Steeplechase	8:29.0	Oslo	1973
2 miles	8:14.4	Stockholm	1974
5000 m	13:17.27	Stockholm	1976
10000 m	28:11.0	Atlanta	1981
Half marathon	1:02:12 NR	Philadelphia	1981
Marathon	2:08:59	New York	1983

== Achievements ==
Year	Competition	Venue	Position	Event	Notes
Representing New Zealand
1972	Olympic Games	Munich, West Germany	3rd, Bronze Medal	1500 metres	3:37.5
1982	1982 IAAF World Cross Country Championships	Rome, Italy	3rd, Bronze Medal	11.978 km	34:01
1984	Olympic Games	Los Angeles, United States	10th	Marathon	2:12:57

Sporting positions
Preceded by (United Kingdom) Brendan Foster	Men's 3.000 m best year performance 1975–1976	Succeeded by (West Germany) Karl Fleschen
Awards
Preceded by Les Mills	Lonsdale Cup of the New Zealand Olympic Committee; 1972	Succeeded by Jack Foster
