= Monica Joyce =

English-Irish-American long-distance runner

Personal information
- Nationality: Irish/American
- Born: 16 July 1958 (age 68) Surrey, England
- Height: 164 cm (5 ft 5 in)
- Weight: 49 kg (108 lb)

Sport
- Sport: Athletics
- Event: middle-distance
- Club: Crawley AC; Westport Athletics Club

Monica Joyce (born 16 July 1958) is an English born, Irish/American long distance runner who competed at the 1984 Summer Olympics.

== Biography ==
Monica and her older sister Regina Joyce grew up with their parents in Sussex, England. She was winning cross country races as early as age 11. Both sisters originally competed for England as junior athletes but switched to Ireland in 1982, based on the citizenship of their parents, for competitive reasons.

Before embarking on her international career, she competed for San Diego State University for two and a half years, finishing second in the 1500 metres at the NCAA Women's Outdoor Track and Field Championships in 1981. She married her college coach Fred La Plante, who continued to coach her.

Monica won the British WAAA Championships title in the 5,000 metres event at the 1982 WAAA Championships and represented Ireland at the 1982 European Athletics Championships, the 1983 World Championship and the 1984 World Cross Country Championships.

Both sisters represented Ireland in the 1984 Summer Olympics, Regina in the Marathon and Monica in the 3000 meters.

Monica ran in the 1985 World Cross Country Championships, finishing 12th and the IAAF World Women's Road Race Championships finishing 8th and won the British WAAA title at the 1985 WAAA Championships.

At home she was the Irish National Champion in the 1500 metres in 1982, 1983 and 1988 with Sonia O'Sullivan a main competitor.

She became a United States citizen in 2000. She has continued running into masters age divisions, in 2002 she won the Gasparilla Distance Classic 15K outright at age 43. At age 50, she beat the W50 World Record in the 5,000 meters at the Mt. SAC Relays, running 16:19.51. That year she also added the 15K road running W50 world record, running 52:38 at the Gate River Run. She also added American records in the 5K, 8K and 10K, the latter for a second time with a 30-second improvement.
