= Amanda Croft =

Chief Nurse for Scotland

Professor Amanda Croft
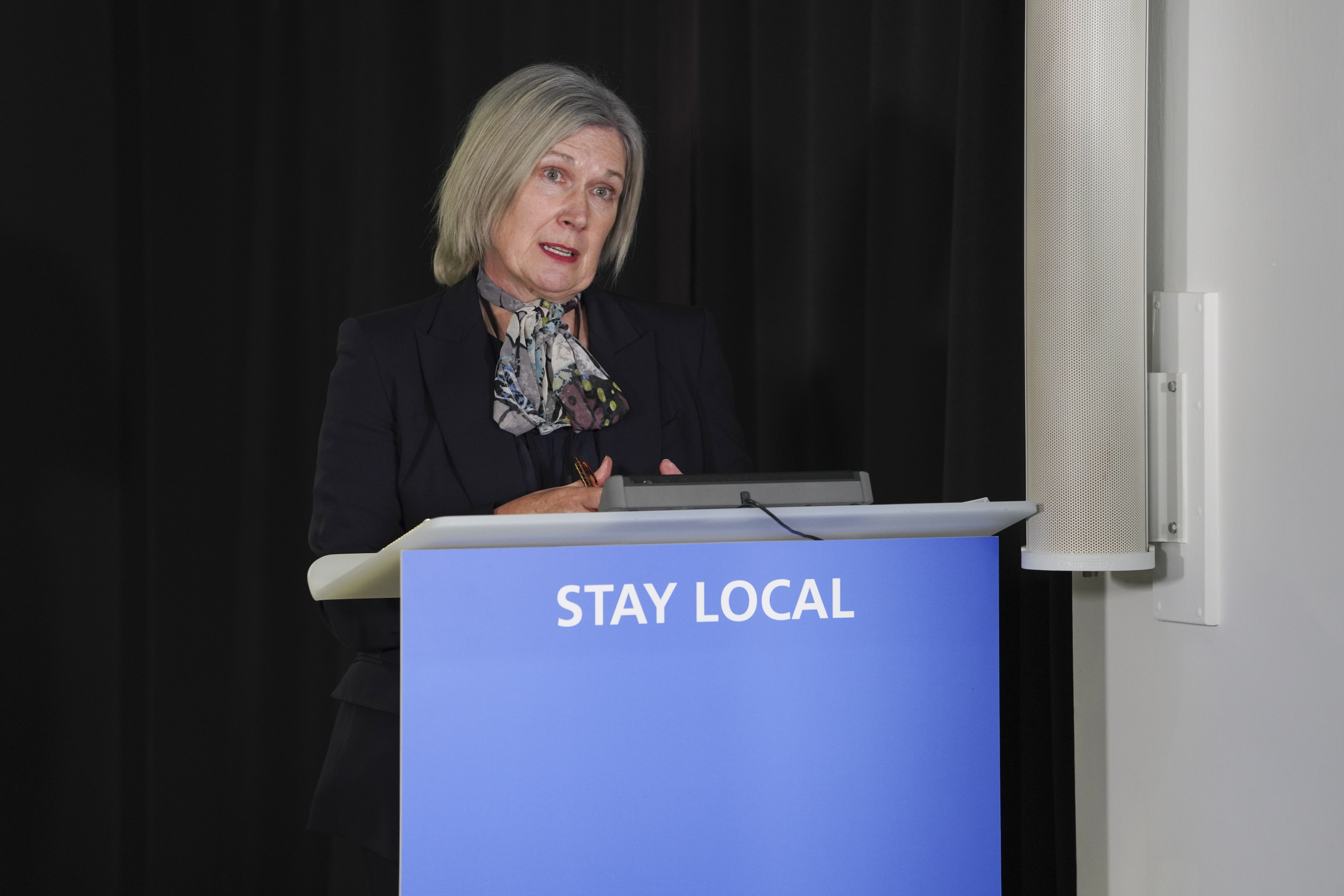
- Croft in 2021

Chief Nursing Officer for Scotland
- Incumbent
- Assumed office January 2021
- Preceded by: Fiona McQueen

Chief Executive for NHS Grampian
- In office April 2019 – June 2020
- Succeeded by: Caroline Hiscox

Amanda Croft is a British nurse, who has served as the Chief Nursing Officer for Scotland since January 2021.

== Nursing career ==
Croft trained at the Sheffield and North Trent School of Nursing (now part of the University of Sheffield), and qualified as a nurse in 1992. She has a Master of Science (MSc) degree in nursing from the University of Aberdeen.

Croft joined NHS Grampian in 2000, and became its Director of Nursing, Midwifery and Allied Healthcare Professionals in September 2015. She was made a visiting professor at Robert Gordon University in August 2016. She served as the Chief Executive of NHS Grampian from April 2019 to June 2020, having been acting CEO for the previous year. On 23 December 2020, she was announced as the next Chief Nursing Officer for Scotland: she took up the post in January 2021.
