= Marit Holtklimpen =

Norwegian long-distance runner

Marit Holtklimpen, married Sektnan (born 20 April 1959) is a retired Norwegian long-distance runner.

She competed in the 3000 metres at the 1983 World Championships without reaching the final, and also recorded 87th and 92nd places at the 1983 and 1984 World Cross Country Championships. Holtklimpen's single greatest year was 1983, when she became Norwegian 1500 and 3000 metres champion, representing her club Gausdal IL.

Her personal best times were 2:09.18 minutes in the 800 metres (1982); 4:15.11 minutes in the 1500 metres (1983); 4:49.95 minutes in the mile run (1982) and 9:14.44 minutes in the 3000 metres (1983).
