= Ruth Partridge =

English long-distance runner

Ruth Partridge née Smeeth
Personal information
- Nationality: British (English)
- Born: 19 June 1960 (age 66) Portsmouth, Hampshire, England

Sport
- Sport: Athletics
- Event: middle-distance
- Club: AFD

Ruth Pauline Partridge (née Smeeth; born 19 June 1960) is a female English retired long-distance runner.

== Biography ==
Smeeth finished second/third behind Mary Stewart in the 1500 metres event at the 1979 WAAA Championships and the following year finished 19th at the 1980 World Cross Country Championships, also winning a silver medal in the team competition.

At the 1982 Commonwealth Games in Brisbane, Australia, Smeeth represented England in the 3,000 metres event and finished 24th at the 1982 World Cross Country Championships, also winning a bronze medal in the team competition.

Smeeth finished 15th at the 1984 World Cross Country Championships, also winning a silver medal in the team competition and finished third behind Christine Benning in the 1500 metres event at the 1984 WAAA Championships.

Smeeth married Richard Partridge in 1985 and competed under her married name thereafter. As Partridge, she finished 20th at the 1986 World Cross Country Championships, also winning a gold medal in the team competition.

Partridge also represented England at the 1990 Commonwealth Games in Auckland, New Zealand. At the 1990 Commonwealth Games Partridge finished sixth in the 3000 metres.

== Family ==
Her daughter is Current British Athlete Lily Partridge
