= Vladimir Kolpakov =

Russian serial killer

- Born: Vladimir Yevgenyevich Kolpakov; 3 October 1961; Stepanakert, Nagorno-Karabakh Autonomous Oblast, Azerbaijani SSR
- Died: 2022 (aged 60–61); Ulyanovsk, Ulyanovsk Oblast, Russia
- Cause of death: Suicide by poisoning
- Conviction: Murder
- Penalty: 15 years imprisonment (1994)

Details
- Victims: 3–5
- Span of crimes: 1987–1994
- Country: Soviet Union, later Russia
- State: Ulyanovsk
- Date apprehended: 1994 (double murder)

Vladimir Yevgenyevich Kolpakov (Russian: Владимир Евгеньевич Колпаков; 3 October 1961 – 2022) was a Soviet-Russian serial killer who was linked via DNA to the murder and subsequent dismemberment of an underage girl in Ulyanovsk dating back to 1987. At the time of his identification, he had served a prison sentence for murdering two male acquaintances during a dispute, and was the prime suspect of two similar murders dating back to the late 1980s.

Before he could be arrested for the crime, Kolpakov committed suicide. The identification of Sazonova's murderer is one of the oldest cold cases to be solved in modern Russian history.

== Early life ==
Vladimir Kolpakov was born on 3 October 1961 in Stepanakert, Azerbaijani SSR, as one of two sons born to Yevgeny Kolpakov, an officer in the Soviet Army who was often stationed in military bases in several countries. As a result, the family often moved around, temporarily settling in Potsdam, East Germany, where Kolpakov graduated from School No. 3 in the fall of 1979.

After his graduation, Kolpakov was drafted into the Soviet Army. During this time, his family returned to the USSR and settled in Ulyanovsk – once he was demobilized, Kolpakov himself moved there as well, remaining in the city for the rest of his life working in low-skilled labor.

=== Disturbing behavior ===
Throughout his youth, Kolpakov was considered a social outcast due to his introverted nature and lack of social skills. According to his brother, this was due to his apparent sexual deviancy, as Kolpakov often spent his free time on the streets trying to meet underage girls.

In 1986, Kolpakov married, but his wife divorced him only two years later. According to her, Kolpakov was deceitful and often stole valuables from their apartment to sell them, only to pretend the extra money was proceeds from his salary. Most disturbingly, she testified that he refused to have sex with her and avoided drinking because he was sexually attracted to minors and became violent when inebriated.

== Murders ==
=== Murder of Olga Sazonova ===
On 16 March 1987, 11-year-old Olga Sazonova left her home to go to the store and buy bread. After buying one loaf of bread, she left the store and then disappeared. A few weeks later, on the early morning of 11 April, a janitor discovered the dismembered remains of a young girl in a garbage container near house No. 27 on Ryabikova Street, including her severed head and fragments of her legs in socks, which had been severed below the knee joint. A fur hat and jacket belonging to the victim were also found inside the container. Traces of semen and paint were found on her remains, socks, and jacket.

Six days later, the missing remains of her legs were found in a garbage chute of buildings No. 22 and No. 44 on Minaeva Street. A forensic autopsy established that the girl died from suffocation and had been severely beaten before her death. Her face had numerous abrasions, lacerations, and hematomas. It was also established that Sazonova had been alive for approximately two weeks after her abduction, preventing the coroner from establishing an exact date of death. There was also speculation that her body had been stored somewhere prior to the discovery of the initial set of remains, likely in a freezer or a balcony.

This allowed investigators to put forward the theory that the killer lived alone and was able to store the body at home without fear of being exposed by other residents of the apartment block. Indirect confirmation of this was provided by the coroner, who stated in his report that the killer took his time carefully cutting off the body parts while avoiding any potential damage to the muscle tissues.

==== Investigation ====
During the initial investigation into Sazonova's murder, operatives took all possible measures to identify the killer. Approximately 300 people were questioned and more than 100 tests were conducted in conjunction with various searches, but officers were unable to uncover any possible clues. The murder itself caused panic among most of the residents, while some attempted to take advantage of it and scammed people under the pretext of building a monument for Sazonova.

At the time, Kolpakov lived on neighboring Ablukova Street and was considered a suspect due to the fact that he was unmarried, lived by himself, and was known to befriend local children. Suspicion against him intensified after Sazonova's parents told investigators that their daughter would never talk to a stranger. During questioning, Kolpakov provided an alibi for the date of Sazonova's disappearance, claiming that he spent most of the day helping a friend move out of an apartment before spending the night at a female friend's apartment, which he left on the afternoon of the following day. For unknown reasons, the investigator who conducted the interrogation never attempted to verify his alibi, allowing Kolpakov to be dismissed as a suspect.

==== Detention of Mikhail Sosnin ====
According to the recollections of Alexander Talynev, the contemporary head of the Ulyanovsk Police Department, soon after Kolpakov's dismissal, the investigation team had a new suspect – Talynev's chauffeur, Mikhail Sosnin. On 12 January 1988, Sosnin was arrested after officers found a hacksaw and an axe stained with blood at his boss' dacha, leading them to believe that he had killed the little girl there. Talynev claimed that the bloodstains belonged to him and dated back to the summer of 1986, when he injured himself while repairing a fence.

This explanation was not enough to warrant the release of Sosnin, who was initially held in a detention center before being moved to a psychiatric clinic due to his deteriorating mental health. A few months after his arrest, a blood test confirmed that the blood type was indeed a match for Talynev, confirming his explanation about the bloodstains. As a result, Sosnin was released, but by that time, his mental health was irreparably damaged. As a result, in January 1995, Sosnin committed suicide by jumping out of a window from his apartment in Saint Petersburg.

=== Double murder and release ===
In 1994, during a domestic dispute, Kolpakov murdered two male acquaintances with whom he was drinking alcohol in his garage. At the end of that year, he was convicted of this crime and sentenced to 15 years imprisonment, the maximum available penalty at the time due to the recent changes to the Russian Criminal Code.

After serving out his sentence in full, Kolpakov was released in 2009 and returned to Ulyanovsk. For some time he lived off his mother and brother, but later managed to earn money by doing low-skilled labor and mostly kept to himself. Due to his introverted nature, he had no close friends and did not date women, but otherwise caused no problems to others and was not subjected to criminal liability for a long time.

== Exposure and suicide ==
In 2018, during a forensic examination at the Ulyanovsk Regional Center, genetic isolated the perpetrator's DNA from the semen stains found on Sazonova's thighs. After two years of testing, the DNA was found to be a match to the genotypic profile of Vladimir Kolpakov, who was forced to submit a sample of his DNA in the early 2000s during his incarceration.

In order to rule out any potential errors, in 2022, the Ulyanovsk Investigative Committee decided to re-investigate Kolpakov's alibi for the day of the murder. As a result, investigator Vijay Novruzov interviewed the two acquaintances whom Kolpakov supposedly spent his day with, with the man claiming that he was not that close with him and never asked for help moving out, while the woman claimed that she did not even know him. A check of Kolpakov's employment records revealed that in mid-March 1987, Kolpakov had not shown up for work for five working days, for which he was subjected to disciplinary action. This led investigators to believe that during these five days, he likely held Sazonova captive in his apartment, where he raped and ultimately killed her.

In the summer of 2022, Kolpakov was visited by law enforcement officers, who took a sample of his saliva and particles of dried paint from the floor, walls, and window frames in the rooms of his apartment for testing. The day after the visit, Kolpakov committed suicide by poisoning himself with carbon monoxide in his garage, without waiting for the results. In the end, his DNA was found to be a conclusive match to the semen traces found on Sazonova's body, confirming that he was the killer. At the request of his relatives, the Ulyanovsk Investigative Committee issue a ruling that his identification be added into the case file, effectively meaning that he was found guilty under the law. In addition to this, while searching his computer after his death, officers found files containing child sexual abuse material.

=== Suspected victims ===
Besides the murder of Olga Sazonova, Kolpakov is the prime suspect in at least two more murders of young girls committed in the Ulyanovsk Oblast. The first was the 28 May 1988 disappearance of Elena Spiridonova, a young girl who was abducted from the Krupskaya sovkhoz by a man driving a red Zhiguli.

The other case involved 11-year-old Olga Ivanova, a fifth-grade student at the Secondary School No. 28. On 15 January 1989, she left her home near the Iskra factory district to go sledding near Pobedy Park, but did not return home. In May of that year, her dismembered remains were found in the Unosti Park area, with her legs sawn off in a similar way to Sazonova.

== See also ==
- List of Russian serial killers
- Cold case

== In the media and culture ==
Two documentaries have been produced covering the case: the first was titled "Once 35 years later" (Russian: Однажды 35 лет спустя) and was shown on "The investigation was conducted..." (Russian: Следствие вели) in 2022. The second one was an official documentary film commissioned by Russia's Ministry of Internal Affairs, titled "Case No. 12. The Killer's Code" (Russian: Дело №12. Код убийцы) from the series "Subject to investigation" (Russian: Расследованию подлежат), released in 2024.
