= Randi Langøigjelten =

Norwegian middle-distance runner

Randi Langøigjelten, formerly married Bjørn (born 26 March 1957) is a retired Norwegian middle-distance runner.

On the track, she competed at the 1982 European Championships without reaching the final. She finished 69th at the 1981 World Cross Country Championships and 61st at the 1983 World Cross Country Championships; at the latter championships also 8th in the team competition.

Langøigjelten became Norwegian 800 metres champion in 1978, 1981, 1982, 1985 and 1986, and won the silver medal in 1977 and 1979. She represented the club FIK Ren-Eng.

She set her first of two Norwegian records in 1981, when she won the national championships in 2:02.70 minutes. The feat earned her that year's King's Cup. Twenty days later she improved to 2:01.7 minutes in Øvre Årdal. The record stood until 2010 when beaten by Ingvill Måkestad Bovim.
