= Fiona McQueen =

Scottish nurse, Chief Nursing Officer for Scotland (2015-2020)

Fiona McQueen CBE
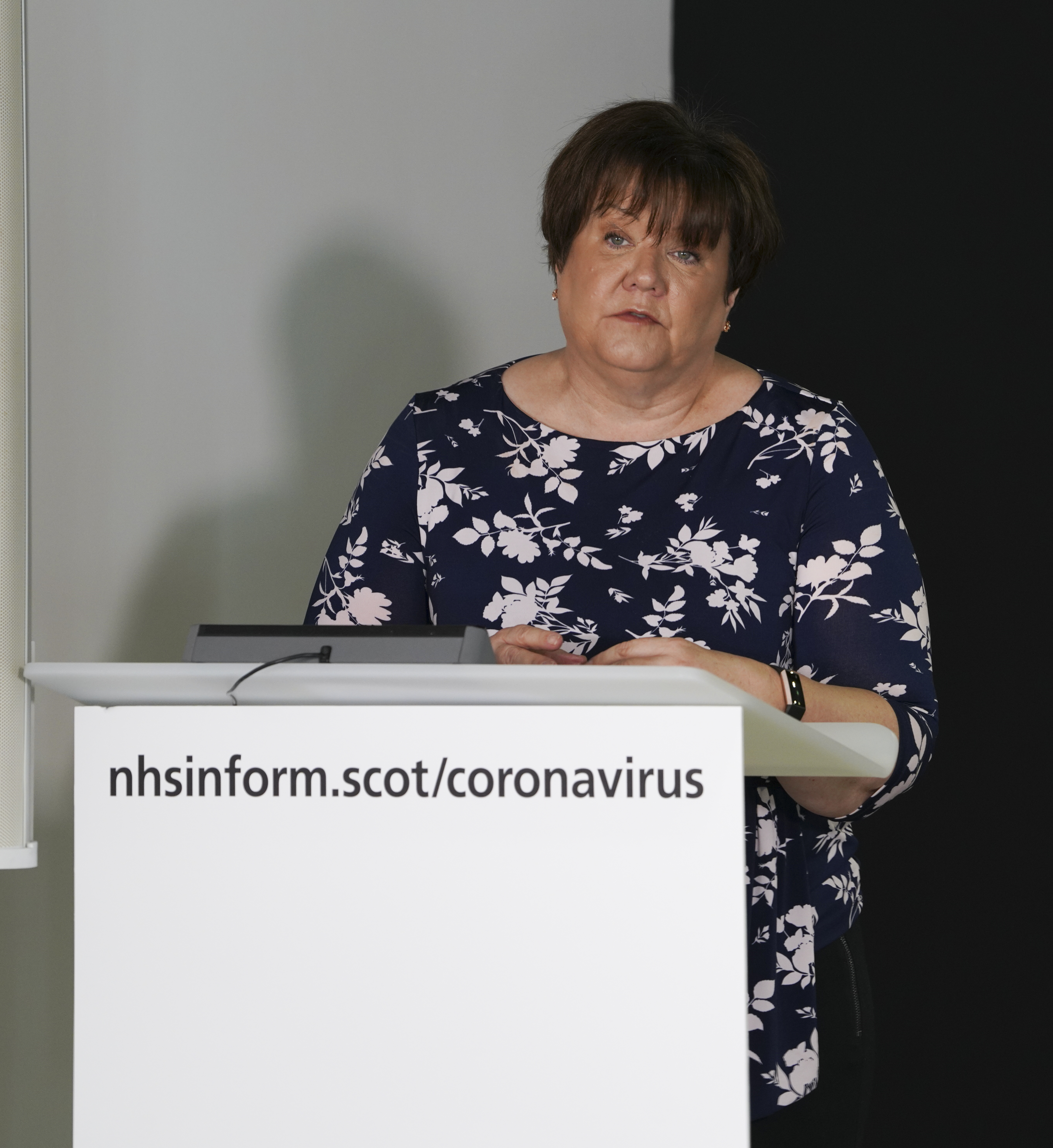
- in April 2020 briefing for Scotland's pandemic response.
- Born: c. 1962
- Occupation: Chief Nursing Officer for Scotland
- Known for: briefing Scotland during the COVID-19 Pandemic
- Medical career
- Profession: nursing

Fiona Catherine McQueen CBE is a Scottish nurse, who was Chief Nursing Officer for Scotland from 2015 to 2021.

== Career ==
Her nursing career began in 1982. She was promoted to be an executive director of nursing for Lanarkshire in 1993. Later she moved to lead nursing at the Acute Services Trust in Ayrshire and Arran. Following the retirement in 2001 of Marjorie Durie OBE Executive Nurse Director and Deputy Chief Executive, Fiona was appointed Director of Nursing in Ayrshire and Arran Health Board.

In November 2014 she became Scotland's interim Chief Nursing Officer after leading nursing in Ayrshire and Arran Health Board for thirteen years. The previous holder was Rosalyn Moore. In the following March she was confirmed as the permanent job holder. In November 2015 she was asked to lead an oversight board to look after NHS Greater Glasgow and Clyde after it was placed in "special measures" after concerns over its infection control.

In 2018 she said that she had been embarrassed that she was offering advice to the people of Scotland who were overweight when she was overweight. Over a year she had controlled her own diet to reduce her weight by over seven stone. She had achieved this by trying to do 15,000 steps a day and cutting out ready meals and sugar.

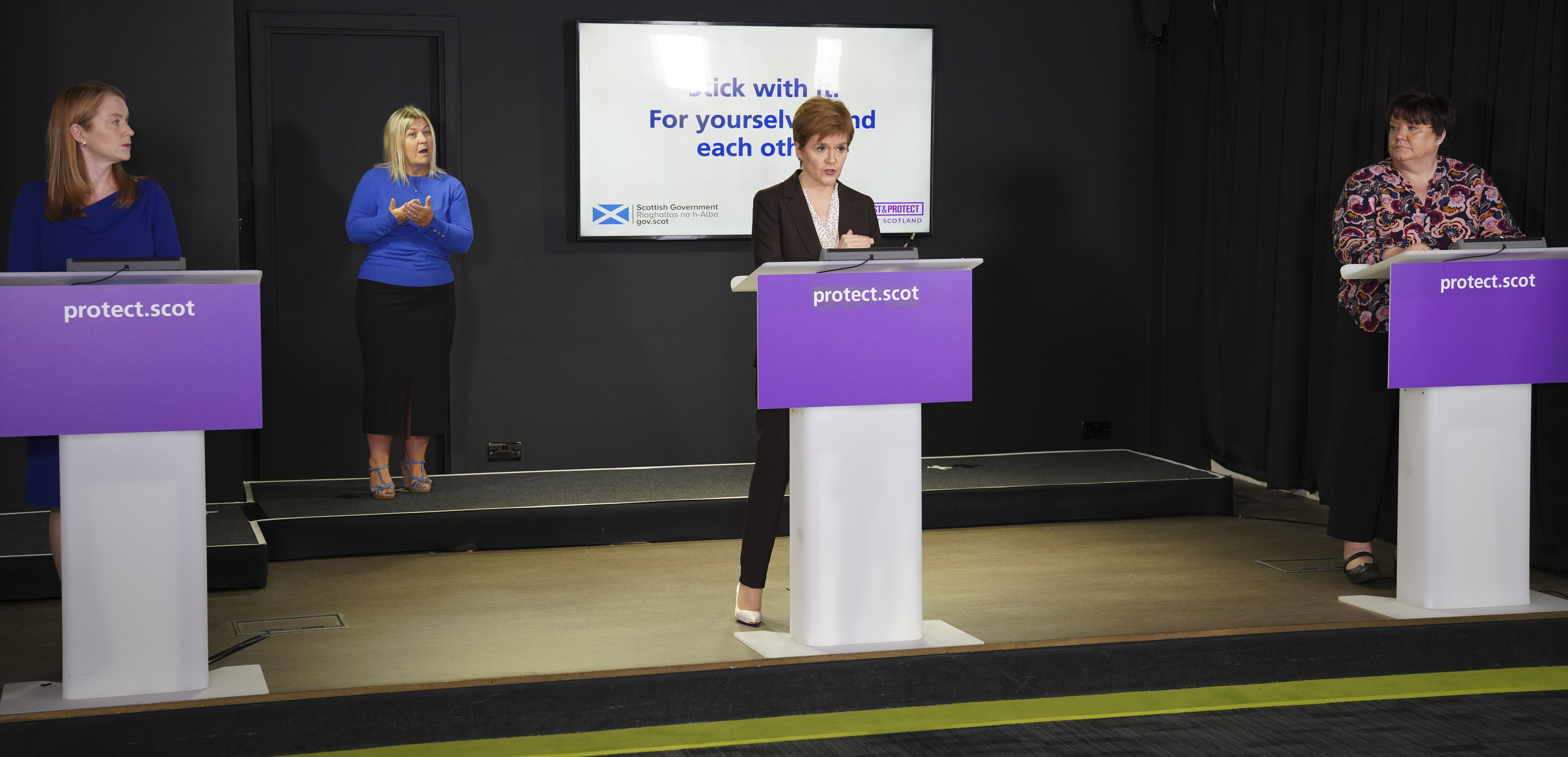
Shirley-Anne Somerville, Nicola Sturgeon and McQueen briefing Scotland during the COVID-19 pandemic in September 2020

In her professional capacity she sat on many boards and committees including as chair of the Scottish Executive Nurse Directors group. She was Scotland's most senior nurse and it was her job to represent Scotland at meetings of the Chief Nursing Officers of England, Wales, Northern Ireland and Scotland.

In 2020, she announced that after five years she was to step down as Scotland's Chief Nursing Officer. She was thanked by Jeane Freeman who was the Scottish Cabinet Secretary for Health and Sport. She extended her term to March 2021 due to the COVID-19 pandemic, and was succeeded in that role by Amanda Croft.

== Recognition ==
McQueen became an honorary Professor at the University of West of Scotland.

McQueen was appointed Commander of the Order of the British Empire (CBE) in the 2021 Birthday Honours for services to the NHS in Scotland.
