= Sylvie Bornet =

French marathoner

Personal information
- Born: January 21, 1960 (age 66) Bourges, France

Sport
- Sport: Marathon running
Medal record
Representing France
Summer Universiade
Bronze medal – third place	1985 Kobe	Marathon

Sylvie Bornet (born January 21, 1960) is a French marathoner who also ran cross-country and middle-distance during her career. In 1987, Bornet won the Twin Cities Marathon, finishing with a time of 2:30:11. She went on to win the Twin Cities Marathon again in 1990 with her personal best time of 2:29:22.

== Running career ==
Sylvie began her running career at the age of 18. On June 11, 1978, she won second place in at a 3000 m race in Brussels, Belgium with a time of 9:38.94. During the 1984 Avon Marathon in Paris, Bornet came in 12th with a time of 2:39:18, winning $1,750. Bornet’s marathon run at the 1985 Universiade competition earned France a gold medal, despite the run being the slowest of her career (2:48:11). During the 1986 London Marathon, Bornet won $10,000 after coming in fourth place in a time of 2:31:43.

In 1987, Bornet placed third at the Houston Marathon, winning $8,000 in a time of 2:37:48. On Oct. 11, 1987, she was the first to cross the finish at the Twin Cities Marathon, winning $25,000 in a time of 2:30:11. Bornet won the Twin Cities Marathon again in 1990 with a career record time of 2:29:22.

At the 1992 Paris Marathon, Bornet took second place with a time of 2:32:24, winning $16,200. She ran the last marathon of her career on Jan. 31, 1993 at the Osaka Women’s International Marathon, ending in 17th place with a 2:43:25 run. Her career earnings amount to $93,850.

== Achievements ==
- 1978 Brussels Marathon 2nd place 9:38:94
- 1984 Avon Marathon 12th place 2:39:18
- 1985 World Athletics Indoor Championships 14th place 2:40:31
- 1985 World Athletics Indoor Championships 3rd place 2:48:11
- 1986 London Marathon 4th place 2:31:43
- 1987 Houston Marathon 3rd place 2:37:48
- 1987 Twin Cities Marathon 1st place 2:30:11
- 1990 Twin Cities Marathon 1st place 2:29:22
- 1992 Paris Marathon 2nd place 2:32:24
- 1993 Osaka International Women’s Marathon 17th place, 2:43:25
