= Anne Marie Malone =

Canadian long-distance runner

Personal information
- Born: 28 July 1960 (age 65) Toronto, Ontario, Canada
- Height: 5′4 1/2″ (165 cm)
- Weight: 93 lb (42 kg)

Sport
- Sport: Long-distance running
- Event: Marathon

Anne Marie Malone (born July 28, 1960 in Toronto, Ontario) is a retired Canadian female long-distance runner. She competed for her native country at the 1984 Summer Olympics in Los Angeles, California. There she placed 17th in the women's marathon. She set her personal best in the classic distance (2:33.00) in 1984. She also represented Canada at the 1982 World Cross Country Championships, where she placed 39th and the team placed 5th. At the 1983 World Cross Country Championships, she place 16th, and team Canada took the bronze medal in the team competition with a score of 53 points. On both teams Anne Marie was the third placing runner for Canada.

== Achievements ==
- All results regarding marathon, unless stated otherwise

Year	Competition	Venue	Position	Notes
Representing Canada
1984	Olympic Games	Los Angeles, United States	17th	2:36:33
