= Jane Furniss-Shields =

English athlete

Jane Shields née Furniss
Personal information
- Nationality: British (English)
- Born: 23 August 1960 (age 65) Sheffield, West Riding of Yorkshire
- Height: 163 cm (5 ft 4 in)
- Weight: 45 kg (99 lb)

Sport
- Sport: Middle and long-distance running
- Event(s): 3000 metres, 10,000 metres
- Club: Sheffield AC

Jane Elizabeth Shields (née Furniss, born 23 August 1960) is a female English former middle and long-distance runner who competed at two Olympic Games.

== Biography ==
At the IAAF World Cross Country Championships, she won a team gold medal in 1986, team silver in 1984 and team bronze in 1982, and had a best individual placing of fifth in 1984. She also finished seventh in the 3000 metres final at the 1983 World Championships,

She represented Great Britain in the 3000 metres at the 1984 Los Angeles Olympics and in the 10,000 metres at the 1988 Seoul Olympics.

She represented England in the 3,000 metres event, at the 1986 Commonwealth Games in Edinburgh, Scotland.

Shields became the British 5,000 metres champion after winning the British AAA Championships title at the 1988 AAA Championships.

Two years later she represented England in the 10,000 metres event, at the 1990 Commonwealth Games in Auckland, New Zealand.

== International competitions ==
Year	Competition	Venue	Position	Event	Notes
Representing Great Britain / England
1981	World Cross Country Championships	Madrid, Spain	22nd	4.4 km	14:56
1982	World Cross Country Championships	Rome, Italy	16th	4.7 km	15:06
1983	World Cross Country Championships	Gateshead, United Kingdom	9th	4.1 km	14:27
1983	World Championships	Helsinki, Finland	7th	3000 m	8:45.69
1984	World Cross Country Championships	New York, United States	5th	5.0 km	16:10
1984	Olympic Games	Los Angeles, United States	heats	3000 m	8:48.00
1986	World Cross Country Championships	Neuchâtel, Switzerland	34th	4.7 km	15:43
1986	Commonwealth Games	Edinburgh, United Kingdom	7th	3000 m	9:13.65
1987	World Cross Country Championships	Warsaw, Poland	31st	5.1 km	17:41
1988	Olympic Games	Seoul, South Korea	26th (h)	10,000 m	32:46.07
1990	Commonwealth Games	Auckland, New Zealand	8th	10,000 m	32:59.42

=== Personal bests ===
- 1500m – 4:11.51 (1983)
- Mile – 4:30.29 (1983)
- 3000 m – 8:45.69 (1983)
- 5000 m – 15:32.34 (1988)
- 10,000 m – 32:42.0 (1988)
