= Tatyana Pozdnyakova =

Soviet-born Ukrainian athlete

Medal record

athletics

Representing the Soviet Union

IAAF World Cup
Silver medal – second place	1985 Canberra	3000 metres
Silver medal – second place	1989 Barcelona	3000 metres

IAAF World Cross Country Championships
Bronze medal – third place	1983 Gateshead	Long course

Tatyana Pozdnyakova (born 4 March 1955 in Sosnovo-Ozerskoye, Buryatia, USSR) is a Ukrainian, former Soviet athlete, known for her performance in marathons. She is the current W45 Masters world record holder in the marathon. In her earlier athletic career, she had her best success on the world stage at the IAAF World Cup, taking a silver medal in the 3000 metres in both the 1985 and 1989 meetings.

== Cross country ==
As early as 1981, she was part of the gold medal winning Soviet team at the World Cross Country Championships, which she repeated in 1982. In 1983 she achieved the individual bronze medal in the long race, 20 seconds ahead of Joan Benoit and just 8 seconds behind Grete Waitz. But the Soviet Union boycotted the 1984 Olympics where those two were the Gold and Silver medalists in the first women's Olympic marathon at the 1984 Olympics. Following her lead, the Soviet team won the Silver medal in 1983 and again in 1985. She also participated in 1989 and 1990 but was not a scoring member of the silver and gold medal winning Soviet teams.

== Track ==
On the track, Pozdnyakova was ranked in the world top ten twice in the 1500 metres (1982 and 1984) and five times in the 5000 metres (1980-2, 1985 and 1989). Her 3:56.50 1500m from 1984 ranks her the 40th best performer ever. In the rarely run 2000 metres, her 5:29.64 from 1984 still ranks her as the #13 performer ever. Her last major track result was finishing 13th in the 10000 metres at the 1991 World Championships. She set her personal record in the 10,000 32:00.24 three days earlier in qualifying. Her track career seemed to end at the same time as the end of the Soviet Union itself.

== Marathon ==
In 1996 she won the Houston Marathon but was disqualified for doping (testing positive for Ephedrine). In 1998, at the age of 43, she reemerged in the Chicago Marathon, finishing 5th amongst an elite field, wearing a 5 digit number. Normally the top runners are given single or double digit numbers. Thus began a new career as a road racer. Living in Gainesville, Florida, she ran up a lengthy string of victories on the American road racing circuit, almost always winning the Masters division but frequently winning the overall women's division. She returned to the Brooks Ocean State Marathon in Providence, Rhode Island several times. In the 2001 edition she set the W45 world record at 2:30:28.

A day before her 47th birthday, she improved upon the record by 2 seconds at the Los Angeles Marathon. Then seven months later she demolished the record running her personal record 2:29:00 again in Providence. Also in 2002, she set the (still current) course record for the Flying Pig Marathon in Cincinnati with a time of 2:34:35. Then 2 days before her 48th birthday she returned to Los Angeles and ran 2:29:40 before a national television audience to take first place overall. Three days after her 49th birthday, she completed back to back overall wins in Los Angeles. And again on her 50th birthday, she ran Los Angeles in 2:31:05, which is currently pending for the W50 world record, more than 17 minutes faster than the current ratified record.
