= Marie-Christine Deurbroeck =

Belgian long-distance runner

Marie-Christine Deurbroeck (born 1 February 1957 in Geraardsbergen, East Flanders) is a retired female long-distance runner from Belgium.

Deurbroeck competed for her native country at the 1984 Summer Olympics in Los Angeles, California. There she ended up in 24th place in the women's marathon. Deurbroeck set her personal best in the classic distance (2:32.32) in 1984.

== Achievements ==
Year	Competition	Venue	Position	Event	Notes
Representing Belgium
1983	World Championships	Helsinki, Finland	—	Marathon	DNF
1984	Olympic Games	Los Angeles, United States	24th	Marathon	2:38:01
