= Joëlle De Brouwer =

French athletics competitor

Personal information
- Nationality: French
- Born: 18 October 1950 (age 74) Maubeuge
- Years active: 1980s

Sport
- Event: middle distance running

Joëlle De Brouwer (born 18 October 1950 in Maubeuge) is a former French athlete who specialized in middle distance running.

== Biography ==
She won six French national Outdoor championships: 2 in the 1 500 m and 4 in the 3 000 m. She was also Indoor Champion of France in the 1,500 m in 1981, and she won 8 French championships in cross-country from 1975 to 1984.

She improved nine times the French record of the 3,000 m, bringing it to 8:59.0. On 1990. June 3, 1983, in Louvain, she establishes a new French 5000m record of 15:52.60.

=== Prize list ===
- French Championships in Athletics:
  - 2 times winner of 1500 m 1976 and 1977
  - 4 times winner of 3000 m 1975, 1978, 1980 and 1981
- French Indoor Athletics Championships:
  - winner of 1500 m in 1981
- France Championships in Cross Country:
  - winner in 1975, 1976, 1977, 1978, 1979, 1981, 1983 and 1984

=== Records ===
Personal Bests
Event	Performance	Location	Date
800 m	2:06.3		1976
1 500 m	4:13.7		1976
mile	4:39.1	Libourne	1985
3 000 m	8:58.94		1980
5 000 m	15:52.60	Löwen	June 1983
marathon	2:38:24	Neuf-Brisach	September 1983

== Notes and references ==
- Docathlé2003, Fédération française d'athlétisme, 2003, p. 398
