= Nan Doak-Davis =

Former American long-distance runner

Nanette ("Nan") Doak-Davis (born March 7, 1962) is a former American long-distance runner who is a United States national champion in the marathon. Doak-Davis attended University of Iowa where she was a six-time All-American in track and field and cross country. She won the 1989 California International Marathon in a time of 2:33:11.

Doak-Davis married Olympian Barry Davis in 1986.

== Achievements ==
Year	Competition	Venue	Position	Event	Notes
Representing the United States
1989	California International Marathon	California State Capitol, United States	1st	Marathon	2:33:11
