= Christine Pfitzinger =

New Zealand middle-distance runner

Personal information
- Born: Christine Joy Hughes; 24 January 1959 (age 67) Hamilton, New Zealand
- Height: 152 cm (5 ft 0 in)
- Weight: 45 kg (99 lb)
- Spouse: Pete Pfitzinger

Sport
- Country: New Zealand
- Sport: Athletics
- Event: Middle-distance running

Achievements and titles
- National finals: 800 m champion (1982, 1987); 1500 m (1986, 1987, 1990, 1999); 3000 m champion (1984, 1988, 1990)

Christine Joy Pfitzinger (née Hughes; born 24 January 1959) is a New Zealand former middle-distance runner. She represented New Zealand at the 1988 Summer Olympics, where she competed in the 3000 metres. She represented New Zealand in the 1987 and 1991 IAAF World Championships and in the 1982, 1986 and 1990 Commonwealth Games. Christine won nine New Zealand national athletic championship titles: the 800 metres in 1982 and 1987; the 1500 metres in 1986, 1987, 1990 and 1999; and the 3000 metres in 1984, 1988 and 1990.

In 1990, Pfitzinger was awarded the New Zealand 1990 Commemoration Medal.

Her husband, Pete Pfitzinger, is a former American marathon runner who represented the United States at the 1984 and 1988 Summer Olympics.
