= Christine Benning =

English middle-distance runner

Christine Benning née Tranter
Personal information
- Nationality: British (English)
- Born: 30 March 1955 (age 71) Urmston, England
- Height: 160 cm (5 ft 3 in)
- Weight: 49 kg (108 lb)

Sport
- Sport: Athletics
- Event: middle-distance
- Club: Southampton & Eastleigh A.A.C.
Medal record
Representing England
Women's Athletics
Commonwealth Games
Silver medal – second place	1978 Edmonton	1500 m

Christine Mary Benning (née Tranter, born 30 March 1955) is an English former middle-distance runner who competed mainly in the 1500 metres and the 3000 metres. In the 1500 m, she represented Great Britain at the 1984 Olympic Games in Los Angeles, finishing fifth in the final. She won a silver medal at the 1978 Commonwealth Games in Edmonton. She also broke the UK record in 1979, with 4:01.53. As of 2022, she still ranks in the UK all-time top ten (outdoors) for the mile.

== Biography ==
Tranter was born in Urmston, Lancashire, and grew up in Swinton, and attended Stand Grammar School.

In 1971, Tranter won the AAAs Under 17 800 metres title. In 1974, still a teenager, she was 15th at the World Cross Country Championships and won a gold medal in the team event. In 1975, she was 18th. She finished fifth in the 1500 m final at the 1977 World Student Games (Universiade) in Sofia in 4:09.7, the same year that she married Martin Benning and competed under her married name thereafter.

In 1978, Benning was 12th at the World Cross Country Championships in Glasgow. In the summer, she became the British 3000 metres champion after winning the British WAAA Championships title at the 1978 WAAA Championships. she won the AAA Championships 3000 m title in 8:52.33. Then at the Commonwealth Games in Edmonton, she won a silver medal in the 1500 m final behind Mary Stewart, running 4:07.53; at the time she worked as a teacher in London. In 1979, she broke Sheila Carey's seven-year-old UK record in the 1500 metres, running 4:01.53 in Zurich. The record would stand for five years. She also became the British 800 champion at the 1979 WAAA Championships.

In the early 1980s, Benning achieved two more top twenty finishes at the World Cross Country Championships, with 14th in 1981 and 18th in 1983. At the 1983 World Championships in Helsinki, she reached the 3000 metres final, finishing thirteenth in 8:58.01.

Benning achieved her highest placement at the World Cross Country Championships in 1984, finishing sixth in New Jersey. Then in the summer, she added the AAAs 1500 m title to her previous wins at 800 m and 3000 m. At the 1984 Los Angeles Olympics, she reached the 1500 m final, finishing fifth in 4:04.70. She ended the 1984 season by running her best ever times in both the 3000 metres and the mile, with 8:44.46 in Zurich and 4:24.57 in London.

In 1986, Benning won the AAAs 3000 m title, going on to place fourth at the Commonwealth Games in Edinburgh. At the 1987 IAAF World Cross Country Championships she finished 20th, her seventh top twenty finish in the event. In the summer, she won the UK Championships 1500 m title. Then at the World Championships in Rome in September, she reached the 3000 m final for the second time, finishing 12th in 8:57.92.

Benning is the only woman to have won AAAs Senior National titles at 800 m, 1500 m and 3000 m. On the UK all-time lists, she ranks 15th in the 1500 m (4:01.53), 11th in the mile (4:24.57) (10th excluding indoor performances) and 18th in the 3000 m (8:44.46).

== National titles ==
- AAAs National Champion - 800 metres (1979)
- AAAs National Champion - 1500 metres (1984)
- AAAs National Champion - 3000 metres (1978, 1986)
- UK National Champion - 1500 metres (1987)

== International competitions ==
Year	Competition	Venue	Position	Event	Notes
Representing Great Britain / England
1974	World Cross Country Championships	Monza, Italy	15th		
1975	World Cross Country Championships	Rabat, Morocco	18th		
1977	World Student Games (Universiade)	Sofia, Bulgaria	5th	1500 m	4:09.7
1978	World Cross Country Championships	Glasgow, Scotland	12th		
1978	Commonwealth Games	Edmonton, Canada	2nd	1500 m	4:07.53
1981	World Cross Cross Country Championships	Madrid, Spain	14th		
1983	World Cross Country Championships	Gateshead, England	18th		
1983	World Championships	Helsinki, Finland	13th	3000 m	8:58.01
1984	World Cross Country Championships	East Rutherford, United States	6th		
1984	Olympic Games	Los Angeles, United States	5th	1500 m	4:04.70
1986	Commonwealth Games	Edinburgh, Scotland	4th	3000 m	9:03.85
1987	World Cross Country Championships	Warsaw, Poland	20th		
1987	World Championships	Rome, Italy	12th	3000 m	8:57.92

Note: At the World Cross Country Championships, representing England, Benning won three team medals, gold in 1974, bronze in 1978 and
silver in 1984.
