= Agnese Possamai =

Italian middle-distance runner

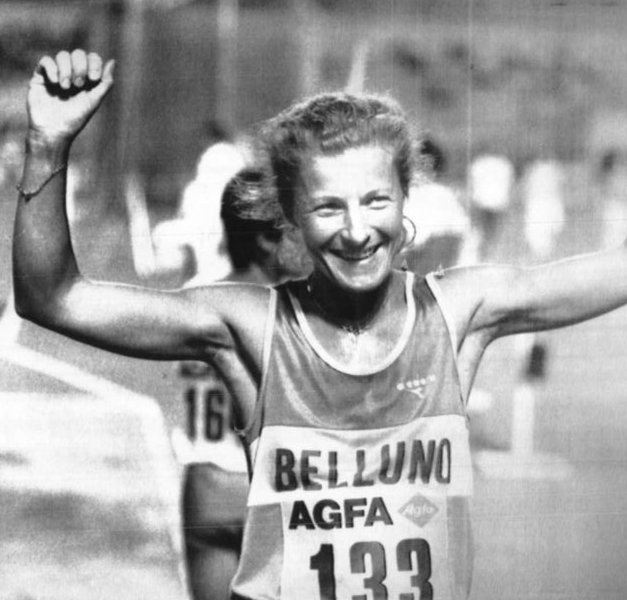

Personal information
- Nationality: Italian
- Born: 17 January 1953 (age 73) Lentiai, Italy
- Height: 1.63 m (5 ft 4 in)
- Weight: 53 kg (117 lb)

Sport
- Country: Italy
- Sport: Athletics
- Event: Middle distance running
- Club: Fiamma Belluno

Achievements and titles
- Personal bests: 800 m: 2:00.36 (1980); 1500 m: 4:05.14 (1984); 3000 m: 8:37.96 (1983)
Medal record
World Indoor Championships
| Silver medal – second place | 1985 Paris | 3000 m |
European Indoor Championships
| Gold medal – first place | 1981 Grenoble | 1500 m |
| Gold medal – first place | 1982 Milan | 3000 m |
| Gold medal – first place | 1985 Athens | 3000 m |
| Silver medal – second place | 1983 Budapest | 3000 m |
Mediterranean Games
| Gold medal – first place | 1983 Casablanca | 1500 m |
| Gold medal – first place | 1983 Casablanca | 3000 m |
| Silver medal – second place | 1979 Split | 800 m |
| Silver medal – second place | 1987 Latakia | 1500 m |
World Cross Country Championships
| Silver medal – second place | 1982 Rome | Team cross country |
| Bronze medal – third place | 1981 Madrid | Team cross country |

Agnese Possamai (born 17 January 1953 in Lentiai) is a retired middle-distance runner from Italy. Her greatest achievements were the 1985 World Indoor silver medal as well as three European Indoor gold medals.

== Biography ==
She won eleven medals at the senior level (9 individual, 2 team) at the international athletics competitions. Her personal best times are 4:08.84 (1500 metres) and 8:37.96 (3000 metres). She has 60 caps in the national team from 1977 to 1988.

== Achievements ==
| Year | Competition | Venue | Position | Event | Notes | |
|---|---|---|---|---|---|---|
| 1979 | Mediterranean Games | Split, Yugoslavia | 2nd | 800 m | 2:03.73 | |
| 1981 | European Indoor Championships | Grenoble, France | 1st | 1500 m | 4:07.49 | |
| 1982 | European Indoor Championships | Milan, Italy | 1st | 3000 m | 8:53.77 | CR |
| 1983 | European Indoor Championships | Budapest, Hungary | 2nd | 3000 m | 9:04.41 | |
| 1983 | Mediterranean Games | Casablanca, Morocco | 1st | 1500 m | 4:13.58 | |
| 1983 | Mediterranean Games | Casablanca, Morocco | 1st | 3000 m | 9:15.64 | |
| 1984 | Olympic Games | Los Angeles, United States | 10th | 3000 m | 9:10.82 | |
| 1985 | European Indoor Championships | Athens, Greece | 1st | 3000 m | 8:55.25 | |
| 1985 | World Indoor Championships | Paris France | 2nd | 3000 m | 9:09.66 | |
| 1987 | Mediterranean Games | Latakia, Syria | 2nd | 1500 m | 4:13.98 | |

== National titles ==
Agnese Possamai has won 24 times the individual national championship.

- Italian Athletics Championships
  - 800 metres: 1978, 1979 (2)
  - 3000 metres: 1982, 1983, 1984, 1985, 1987 (5)
  - 1500 metres indoor: 1979, 1980, 1981, 1984, 1986 (5)
  - 3000 metres indoor: 1982, 1983, 1984 (3)
  - cross country running: 1978, 1980, 1981, 1982, 1984, 1985, 1986 (7)
- Italian Mountain Running Championships
  - Mountain running: 1980, 1981 (2)

== See also ==
- Italy national athletics team - Multiple medalists
- Italian Athletics Championships - Women multi winners
- Italy national athletics team - Women's more caps
- Italian all-time top lists - 800 m
- Italian all-time top lists - 1500 m
