= Eva Ernström =

Swedish long-distance runner

Personal information
- Full name: Eva Margareta Ernström
- Nationality: Swedish
- Born: 2 September 1961 Stockholm, Sweden
- Died: 8 November 2017 (aged 56)

Sport
- Sport: Long-distance running
- Event: 3000 metres

Eva Margareta Ernström (2 September 1961 – 8 November 2017) was a Swedish long-distance runner. She competed in the women's 3000 metres at the 1984 Summer Olympics.

Ernström competed for the San Diego State Aztecs track and field team in the NCAA.
