= Francine Peeters =

Belgian long-distance runner

Francine Peeters (born 23 February 1957) is a retired female long-distance runner from Belgium. She competed for her native country at the 1984 Summer Olympics in Los Angeles, California. There she ended up in 29th place in the women's marathon. Peeters set her personal best in the classic distance (2:34.53) in 1984.

She was a successful cross country runner on the Belgian circuit and won the inaugural women's Lotto Cross Cup in 1984.

== Achievements ==
| Year | Competition | Venue | Position | Event | Notes |
Representing Belgium
| 1984 | Egmond Half Marathon | Egmond, Netherlands | 1st | Half Marathon | 1:18:20 |
| 1984 | Olympic Games | Los Angeles, United States | 29th | Marathon | 2:42:22 |
