= Mary O'Connor (runner) =

New Zealand long-distance runner

Mary Theresa O'Connor (born 19 April 1955) is a retired long-distance runner from New Zealand. She competed for her native country at the 1984 Summer Olympics in Los Angeles, California. There she ended up in 27th place in the women's marathon. O'Connor set her personal best in the classic distance (2:28.20) in 1983. She was born in Hokitika, West Coast.

In 1990, O'Connor was awarded the New Zealand 1990 Commemoration Medal.

== Achievements ==
Year	Competition	Venue	Position	Notes
Representing New Zealand
1983	World Championships	Helsinki, Finland	34th	Marathon
1984	Olympic Games	Los Angeles, United States	27th	Marathon
