= 1980 IAAF World Cross Country Championships – Senior men's race =

Senior men's race at the 1980 IAAF World Cross Country Championships
- Organisers: IAAF
- Edition: 8th
- Date: March 9
- Host city: Paris, France
- Venue: Hippodrome de Longchamp
- Events: 1
- Distances: 12.58 km – Senior men
- Participation: 180 athletes from 25 nations

The Senior men's race at the 1980 IAAF World Cross Country Championships was held in Paris, France, at the Hippodrome de Longchamp on March 9, 1980. A report on the event was given in the Evening Times.

Complete results, medallists, and the results of British athletes were published.

== Race results ==
=== Senior men's race (12.58 km) ===
==== Individual ====
Rank	Athlete	Country	Time
1st place, gold medalist(s)	Craig Virgin	United States	37:01
2nd place, silver medalist(s)	Hans-Jürgen Orthmann	West Germany	37:02
3rd place, bronze medalist(s)	Nick Rose	England	37:05
4	Léon Schots	Belgium	37:11
5	John Robson	Scotland	37:20
6	Aleksandr Antipov	Soviet Union	37:21
7	Leonid Moseyev	Soviet Union	37:21
8	Antonio Prieto	Spain	37:21
9	Steve Jones	Wales	37:23
10	Bernie Ford	England	37:25
11	Karel Lismont	Belgium	37:27
12	Daniel Dillon	United States	37:28
13	El Hachami Abdenouz	Algeria	37:31
14	Barry Smith	England	37:33
15	Thierry Watrice	France	37:39
16	Fernando Mamede	Portugal	37:42
17	Steve Kenyon	England	37:44
18	John Treacy	Ireland	37:44
19	Nick Lees	England	37:47
20	Klaas Lok	Netherlands	37:48
21	Alex Hagelsteens	Belgium	37:49
22	José Luis González	Spain	37:51
23	Kenneth Martin	United States	37:53
24	Dominique Coux	France	37:54
25	Alex Gonzalez	France	37:54
26	Carlos Lopes	Portugal	37:55
27	François Person	France	37:55
28	Valeriy Sapon	Soviet Union	37:56
29	Allister Hutton	Scotland	37:57
30	José Sena	Portugal	37:59
31	Jim Brown	Scotland	38:00
32	Mohamed Zaidi	Tunisia	38:01
33	Enn Sellik	Soviet Union	38:06
34	Michael Karst	West Germany	38:07
35	Peter Butler	Canada	38:08
36	Steve Plasencia	United States	38:08
37	Graham Tuck	England	38:08
38	Eddy de Pauw	Belgium	38:10
39	Radhouane Bouster	France	38:15
40	Hugh Jones	England	38:17
41	Luis Adsuara	Spain	38:20
42	Rachid Habchaoui	Algeria	38:22
43	Don Clary	United States	38:23
44	Frank Grillaert	Belgium	38:24
45	Pär Wallin	Sweden	38:25
46	Lawrie Spence	Scotland	38:26
47	Valeriy Abramov	Soviet Union	38:26
48	Mark Anderson	United States	38:27
49	Abdelmadjid Mada	Algeria	38:27
50	Manfred Schoeneberg	West Germany	38:28
51	Mick O'Shea	Ireland	38:28
52	Eugenio Hernandez	Spain	38:32
53	David James	Wales	38:33
54	Philippe Daniel	France	38:34
55	Paul Williams	Canada	38:37
56	Santiago de la Parte	Spain	38:39
57	Roger de Vogel	Belgium	38:40
58	John McLaughlin	Northern Ireland	38:41
59	Marco Marchei	Italy	38:42
60	Franco Ambrosioni	Italy	38:43
61	Lahcene Babaci	Algeria	38:43
62	Roger Hackney	Wales	38:43
63	Hsu Liang	China	38:44
64	Nick Brawn	England	38:45
65	Thomas Wessinghage	West Germany	38:45
66	Lahcen El Hachmi	Morocco	38:46
67	Stig Roar Husby	Norway	38:47
68	Carlos Tavares	Portugal	38:47
69	Tapio Kantanen	Finland	38:48
70	Jacques Boxberger	France	38:48
71	Mohamed Naoumi	Morocco	38:49
72	Argimiro González	Spain	38:50
73	John Graham	Scotland	38:51
74	Øyvind Dahl	Norway	38:52
75	Ennio Panetti	Italy	38:53
76	Terry Goodenough	Canada	38:56
77	Lubomir Tesacek	Czechoslovakia	39:00
78	Greg Duhaime	Canada	39:00
79	Mohamed Salem	Algeria	39:01
80	Mehdi Aidet	Algeria	39:01
81	Willi Maier	West Germany	39:01
82	Gerard Tebroke	Netherlands	39:04
83	Greg Hannon	Northern Ireland	39:05
84	Hedi Gandouzi	Tunisia	39:06
85	Driss Talambouti	Morocco	39:07
86	Tonni Luttikhold	Netherlands	39:09
87	Silvano Babici	Italy	39:10
88	Michele Cinà	Italy	39:11
89	Anacleto Pinto	Portugal	39:11
90	Henk Mentink	Netherlands	39:11
91	Abdelkrim Djelassi	Tunisia	39:12
92	Barry Knight	England	39:12
93	Danny McDaid	Ireland	39:13
94	Cándido Alario	Spain	39:13
95	Jean-Paul Gomez	France	39:13
96	Cidalio Caetano	Portugal	39:17
97	Piet Waaning	Netherlands	39:18
98	Ismo Toukonen	Finland	39:19
99	Mike Dyon	Canada	39:21
100	Neil Cusack	Ireland	39:21
101	Eero Kinaret	Sweden	39:22
102	Abdelkader Zaddem	Tunisia	39:24
103	Martti Kiilholma	Finland	39:24
104	Duncan Macdonald	United States	39:25
105	Gerry Deegan	Ireland	39:26
106	Glen Grant	Wales	39:27
107	Johan Geirnaert	Belgium	39:30
108	Ray Treacy	Ireland	39:31
109	Fernando Fernandez	Spain	39:32
110	Hannu Okkola	Finland	39:33
111	Werner Grommisch	West Germany	39:33
112	Valdur Koha	West Germany	39:37
113	Tommy Ekblom	Finland	39:39
114	Jan Hagelbrand	Sweden	39:41
115	Rolf Kårevik	Sweden	39:43
116	Jon Sinclair	United States	39:44
117	Mahmoud Hazzazi	Algeria	39:45
118	Tahar Bounab	Algeria	39:49
119	Alain Bordeleau	Canada	39:51
120	Otello Sorato	Italy	39:53
121	Gerry Finnegan	Ireland	39:54
122	Alberto Cova	Italy	39:55
123	Michael Lane	Wales	39:55
124	Dahou Belghazi	Morocco	39:55
125	Vladimir Pesekhonov	Soviet Union	39:56
126	Piet Vonck	Netherlands	39:57
127	Bo Orrsveden	Sweden	39:58
128	Graham Clark	Scotland	39:59
129	Svend-Erik Kristensen	Denmark	40:00
130	Peter Moore	Canada	40:03
131	Gordon Rimmer	Scotland	40:05
132	Heino Lipsanen	Finland	40:11
133	Bo Nytofle	Denmark	40:12
134	Mohamed El Bali	Morocco	40:13
135	Francisco Guerra	Spain	40:14
136	Ari Paunonen	Finland	40:15
137	Andreas Weniger	West Germany	40:15
138	Clive Thomas	Wales	40:16
139	Jo Schout	Netherlands	40:17
140	Alan Cole	Wales	40:19
141	Ardhaoui Borni	Tunisia	40:21
142	Mustapha Oulghazi	Morocco	40:23
143	Keld Johnsen	Denmark	40:26
144	Ferid Mekki	Tunisia	40:27
145	Donal Walsh	Ireland	40:27
146	Mansour Guettaya	Tunisia	40:28
147	Don Howieson	Canada	40:28
148	Chris Buckley	Wales	40:29
149	Vlastimil Zwiefelhofer	Czechoslovakia	40:33
150	Rod Stone	Northern Ireland	40:40
151	Lars Bo Sørensen	Denmark	40:44
152	Ernie Cunningham	Northern Ireland	40:44
153	Pertti Tiainen	Finland	40:45
154	Paul O'Callaghan	Ireland	40:48
155	Liu Zonggui	China	40:58
156	Amara Chiha	Tunisia	41:03
157	Omar Anassi	Morocco	41:13
158	David Gillanders	Sweden	41:15
159	Per Hoffmann	Denmark	41:17
160	Yehuda Zadok	Israel	41:20
161	Seppo Liuttu	Finland	41:27
162	Leon Weyers	Netherlands	41:28
163	Christian Wolfsberg	Denmark	41:28
164	Arye Gamliel	Israel	41:43
165	Tom Annett	Northern Ireland	42:05
166	Paul Lawther	Northern Ireland	42:24
167	Brian McSloy	Scotland	42:31
168	Cameron Spence	Northern Ireland	42:34
169	Pat McCullough	Northern Ireland	42:38
170	Huang Tzawen	China	42:42
—	João Campos	Portugal	DNF
—	Mats Erixon	Sweden	DNF
—	Christoph Herle	West Germany	DNF
—	Venanzio Ortis	Italy	DNF
—	Willy Polleunis	Belgium	DNF
—	Aniceto Simoes	Portugal	DNF
—	Guy Bourban	France	DNF
—	Nat Muir	Scotland	DNF
—	Guy Arbogast	United States	DNF
—	Robert Lismont	Belgium	DNF

==== Teams ====
Rank	Team	Points
1st place, gold medalist(s)	England: Nick Rose / 3; Bernie Ford / 10; Barry Smith / 14; Steve Kenyon / 17; Nick Lees / 19; Graham Tuck / 37; (Hugh Jones) / (40); (Nick Brawn) / (64); (Barry Knight) / (92)	100
2nd place, silver medalist(s)	United States: Craig Virgin / 1; Daniel Dillon / 12; Kenneth Martin / 23; Steve Plasencia / 36; Don Clary / 43; Mark Anderson / 48; (Duncan Macdonald) / (104); (Jon Sinclair) / (116); (Guy Arbogast) / (DNF)	163
3rd place, bronze medalist(s)	Belgium: Léon Schots / 4; Karel Lismont / 11; Alex Hagelsteens / 21; Eddy de Pauw / 38; Frank Grillaert / 44; Roger de Vogel / 57; (Johan Geirnaert) / (107); (Willy Polleunis) / (DNF); (Robert Lismont) / (DNF)	175
4	France: Thierry Watrice / 15; Dominique Coux / 24; Alex Gonzalez / 25; François Person / 27; Radhouane Bouster / 39; Philippe Daniel / 54; (Jacques Boxberger) / (70); (Jean-Paul Gomez) / (95); (Guy Bourban) / (DNF)	184
5	Soviet Union: Aleksandr Antipov / 6; Leonid Moseyev / 7; Valeriy Sapon / 28; Enn Sellik / 33; Valeriy Abramov / 47; Vladimir Pesekhonov / 125	246
6	Spain: Antonio Prieto / 8; José Luis González / 22; Luis Adsuara / 41; Eugenio Hernandez / 52; Santiago de la Parte / 56; Argimiro González / 72; (Cándido Alario) / (94); (Fernando Fernandez) / (109); (Francisco Guerra) / (135)	251
7	Scotland: John Robson / 5; Allister Hutton / 29; Jim Brown / 31; Lawrie Spence / 46; John Graham / 73; Graham Clark / 128; (Gordon Rimmer) / (131); (Brian McSloy) / (167); (Nat Muir) / (DNF)	312
8	Algeria: El Hachami Abdenouz / 13; Rachid Habchaoui / 42; Abdelmadjid Mada / 49; Lahcene Babaci / 61; Mohamed Salem / 79; Mehdi Aïdet / 80; (Mahmoud Hazzazi) / (117); (Tahar Bounab) / (118)	324
9	Portugal: Fernando Mamede / 16; Carlos Lopes / 26; José Sena / 30; Carlos Tavares / 68; Anacleto Pinto / 89; Cidalio Caetano / 96; (João Campos) / (DNF); (Aniceto Simoes) / (DNF)	325
10	West Germany: Hans-Jürgen Orthmann / 2; Michael Karst / 34; Manfred Schoeneberg / 50; Thomas Wessinghage / 65; Willi Maier / 81; Werner Grommisch / 111; (Valdur Koha) / (112); (Andreas Weniger) / (137); (Christoph Herle) / (DNF)	343
11	Canada: Peter Butler / 35; Paul Williams / 55; Terry Goodenough / 76; Greg Duhaime / 78; Mike Dyon / 99; Alain Bordeleau / 119; (Peter Moore) / (130); (Don Howieson) / (147)	462
12	Ireland: John Treacy / 18; Mick O'Shea / 51; Danny McDaid / 93; Neil Cusack / 100; Gerry Deegan / 105; Ray Treacy / 108; (Gerry Finnegan) / (121); (Donal Walsh) / (145); (Paul O'Callaghan) / (154)	475
13	Italy: Marco Marchei / 59; Franco Ambrosioni / 60; Ennio Panetti / 75; Silvano Babici / 87; Michele Cinà / 88; Otello Sorato / 120; (Alberto Cova) / (122); (Venanzio Ortis) / (DNF)	489
14	Wales: Steve Jones / 9; David James / 53; Roger Hackney / 62; Glen Grant / 106; Michael Lane / 123; Clive Thomas / 138; (Alan Cole) / (140); (Chris Buckley) / (148)	491
15	Netherlands: Klaas Lok / 20; Gerard Tebroke / 82; Tonni Luttikhold / 86; Henk Mentink / 90; Piet Waaning / 97; Piet Vonck / 126; (Jo Schout) / (139); (Leon Weyers) / (162)	501
16	Tunisia: Mohamed Zaidi / 32; Hedi Gandouzi / 84; Abdelkrim Djelassi / 91; Abdelkader Zaddem / 102; Ardhaoui Borni / 141; Ferid Mekki / 144; (Mansour Guettaya) / (146); (Amara Chiha) / (156)	594
17	Morocco: Lahcen El Hachmi / 66; Mohamed Naoumi / 71; Driss Talambouti / 85; Dahou Belghazi / 124; Mohamed El Bali / 134; Mustapha Oulghazi / 142; (Omar Anassi) / (157)	622
18	Finland: Tapio Kantanen / 69; Ismo Toukonen / 98; Martti Kiilholma / 103; Hannu Okkola / 110; Tommy Ekblom / 113; Heino Lipsanen / 132; (Ari Paunonen) / (136); (Pertti Tiainen) / (153); (Seppo Liuttu) / (161)	625
19	Sweden: Pär Wallin / 45; Eero Kinaret / 101; Jan Hagelbrand / 114; Rolf Kårevik / 115; Bo Orrsveden / 127; David Gillanders / 158; (Mats Erixon) / (DNF)	660
20	Northern Ireland: John McLaughlin / 58; Greg Hannon / 83; Rod Stone / 150; Ernie Cunningham / 152; Tom Annett / 165; Paul Lawther / 166; (Cameron Spence) / (168); (Pat McCullough) / (169)	774
21	Denmark: Svend-Erik Kristensen / 129; Bo Nytofle / 133; Keld Johnsen / 143; Lars Bo Sørensen / 151; Per Hoffmann / 159; Christian Wolfsberg / 163	878

- Note: Athletes in parentheses did not score for the team result

== Participation ==
An unofficial count yields the participation of 180 athletes from 25 countries in the Senior men's race. This is in agreement with the official numbers as published.

- Algeria (8)
- Belgium (9)
- Canada (8)
- China (3)
- Czechoslovakia (2)
- Denmark (6)
- England (9)
- Finland (9)
- France (9)
- Ireland (9)
- Israel (2)
- Italy (8)
- Morocco (7)
- Netherlands (8)
- Northern Ireland (8)
- Norway (2)
- Portugal (8)
- Scotland (9)
- Soviet Union (6)
- Spain (9)
- Sweden (7)
- Tunisia (8)
- United States (9)
- Wales (8)
- West Germany (9)

== See also ==
- 1980 IAAF World Cross Country Championships – Junior men's race
- 1980 IAAF World Cross Country Championships – Senior women's race
