= 1979 IAAF World Cross Country Championships – Senior men's race =

Senior men's race at the 1979 IAAF World Cross Country Championships
- Organisers: IAAF
- Edition: 7th
- Date: 25 March
- Host city: Limerick, Munster, Ireland (Republic of Ireland)
- Venue: Greenpark Racecourse
- Events: 1
- Distances: 12 km – Senior men
- Participation: 191 athletes from 26 nations

The Senior men's race at the 1979 IAAF World Cross Country Championships was held in Limerick, Ireland, at the Greenpark Racecourse on 25 March 1979. A report on the event was given in the Glasgow Herald.

Complete results, medallists, and the results of British athletes were published.

== Race results ==
=== Senior men's race (12 km) ===
==== Individual ====
Rank	Athlete	Country	Time
1st place, gold medalist(s)	John Treacy	Ireland	37:20
2nd place, silver medalist(s)	Bronisław Malinowski	Poland	37:29
3rd place, bronze medalist(s)	Aleksandr Antipov	Soviet Union	37:30
4	Tony Simmons	Wales	37:38
5	Léon Schots	Belgium	37:42
6	Vlastimil Zwiefelhofer	Czechoslovakia	37:45
7	Steve Jones	Wales	37:46
8	Frank Zimmermann	West Germany	37:48
9	Julian Goater	England	37:53
10	Nat Muir	Scotland	38:01
11	Danny McDaid	Ireland	38:02
12	Bogusław Mamiński	Poland	38:04
13	Craig Virgin	United States	38:05
14	Mike McLeod	England	38:07
15	José Luis González	Spain	38:08
16	Christoph Herle	West Germany	38:09
17	Euan Robertson	New Zealand	38:10
18	Leonid Moseyev	Soviet Union	38:11
19	Frank Grillaert	Belgium	38:15
20	Andy Holden	England	38:20
21	Nick Rose	England	38:29
22	Bernie Ford	England	38:29
23	Maciej Kunicki	Poland	38:30
24	Hans-Jürgen Orthmann	West Germany	38:30
25	Alex Gonzalez	France	38:32
26	Eric De Beck	Belgium	38:33
27	Franco Fava	Italy	38:34
28	Klaas Lok	Netherlands	38:35
29	Steve Austin	Australia	38:36
30	Gerard Tebroke	Netherlands	38:37
31	Greg Hannon	Northern Ireland	38:38
32	Gerard Barrett	Australia	38:39
33	Nick Lees	England	38:42
34	Michael Karst	West Germany	38:43
35	Yuriy Mikhailov	Soviet Union	38:44
36	Bill Scott	Australia	38:45
37	Roy Bailey	England	38:46
38	Enn Sellik	Soviet Union	38:47
39	Santiago de la Parte	Spain	38:48
40	James Langford	Australia	38:49
41	Fernando Mamede	Portugal	38:51
42	Jean-Paul Gomez	France	38:52
43	Gerry Deegan	Ireland	38:58
44	Daniel Dillon	United States	38:59
45	Brian Lewry	Australia	39:01
46	Mick O'Shea	Ireland	39:02
47	Donal Walsh	Ireland	39:03
48	Aleksandr Fedotkin	Soviet Union	39:04
49	Marc Hunter	United States	39:05
50	Tony Brien	Ireland	39:06
51	Robert McDonald	Australia	39:07
52	John Robson	Scotland	39:08
53	Eddy Van Mullem	Belgium	39:09
54	Francis Gonzalez	France	39:10
55	Kevin Ryan	New Zealand	39:11
56	Peter Butler	Canada	39:12
57	Inge Simonsen	Norway	39:13
58	Howard Healey	New Zealand	39:14
59	Willy Polleunis	Belgium	39:15
60	Giuseppe Gerbi	Italy	39:15
61	Ryszard Kopijasz	Poland	39:20
62	Rob de Castella	Australia	39:20
63	Klaus-Peter Hildenbrand	West Germany	39:21
64	Bill Donakowski	United States	39:22
65	Claudio Solone	Italy	39:23
66	Manfred Schoeneberg	West Germany	39:24
67	Luigi Zarcone	Italy	39:25
68	Vladimir Merkushin	Soviet Union	39:26
69	Hendrik Schoofs	Belgium	39:27
70	Eamonn Coghlan	Ireland	39:28
71	Pierre Délèze	Switzerland	39:29
72	Chris Wardlaw	Australia	39:30
73	Ken Newton	England	39:31
74	Lawrie Spence	Scotland	39:32
75	Valeriy Abramov	Soviet Union	39:33
76	Roger De Vogel	Belgium	39:34
77	Zbigniew Pierzynka	Poland	39:35
78	Antonio Prieto	Spain	39:36
79	Ray Treacy	Ireland	39:37
80	Constantino Esparcia	Spain	39:38
81	Robbie Perkins	United States	39:39
82	Henk Mentink	Netherlands	39:40
83	Fredi Griner	Switzerland	39:41
84	Tonni Luttikhold	Netherlands	39:42
85	Reinhard Leibold	West Germany	39:43
86	Ron Vanderkraats	Canada	39:44
87	John Dixon	New Zealand	39:45
88	Jean-Luc Paugam	France	39:46
89	Barry Smith	England	39:47
90	Greg Meyer	United States	39:48
91	Øyvind Dahl	Norway	39:51
92	Elie Aubertin	Belgium	39:52
93	Gelindo Bordin	Italy	39:53
94	Aniceto Simoes	Portugal	39:54
95	José Luis Ruiz	Spain	39:55
96	Larry Brown	Canada	39:56
97	Mike Dixon	Canada	39:57
98	Hugo Wey	Switzerland	39:58
99	Joseph Patton	Scotland	39:59
100	Estanislao Duran	Spain	40:00
101	Steve Flanagan	United States	40:01
102	Guido Rhyn	Switzerland	40:02
103	Guy Bourban	France	40:03
104	Jean-Pierre Berset	Switzerland	40:04
105	Allister Hutton	Scotland	40:05
106	Ennio Panetti	Italy	40:06
107	Peter Baker	Wales	40:07
108	Greg Duhaime	Canada	40:08
109	Art Boileau	Canada	40:09
110	Jim Johansen	Norway	40:10
111	Alan Thurlow	New Zealand	40:11
112	Adam Shoemaker	Canada	40:12
113	Jean-Marie Conrath	France	40:13
114	Clive Thomas	Wales	40:14
115	Peder Arne Sylte	Norway	40:15
116	Piet Vonck	Netherlands	40:16
117	Blaise Schull	Switzerland	40:17
118	Joost Borm	Netherlands	40:18
119	Peter Moore	Canada	40:19
120	David Chettle	Australia	40:20
121	Detlef Uhlemann	West Germany	40:21
122	Manuel Paiva	Portugal	40:22
123	Karsten Hald Nielsen	Denmark	40:23
124	Bjarte Sleire	Norway	40:24
125	Peter Lindtner	Austria	40:25
126	Rod Stone	Northern Ireland	40:26
127	Eddie Leddy	Ireland	40:27
128	Josef Steiner	Austria	40:28
129	Gerard Nijboer	Netherlands	40:29
130	Edmund Turner	Wales	40:30
131	Christian Cairoche	France	40:31
132	José Sena	Portugal	40:32
133	Bruce Jones	New Zealand	40:33
134	Rob Lonergan	Canada	40:34
135	Philippe Legrand	France	40:35
136	José Haro	Spain	40:36
137	Bobb Thomas	United States	40:45
138	Jørn Lauenborg	Denmark	40:50
139	David Gillanders	Sweden	40:51
140	Philippe Daniel	France	40:52
141	John Davies	Wales	40:53
142	Gösta Johansson	Sweden	40:54
143	Martin Couldwell	New Zealand	40:55
144	Cameron Spence	Northern Ireland	40:56
145	Eugeniusz Stacha	Poland	41:02
146	Laurence Reilly	Scotland	41:03
147	José Simoes	Portugal	41:04
148	Wolfgang Konrad	Austria	41:05
149	Paul Lawther	Northern Ireland	41:06
150	Daniel O'Connell	New Zealand	41:07
151	Piero Selvaggio	Italy	41:09
152	José Manuel Abascal	Spain	41:10
153	Roger Hackney	Wales	41:17
154	Luigi Lauro	Italy	41:19
155	Jack Foster	New Zealand	41:22
156	Niels Kim Hjorth	Denmark	41:23
157	Henning Rasmussen	Denmark	41:24
158	Gordon Rimmer	Scotland	41:31
159	Johan Geirnaert	Belgium	41:34
160	Helder de Jesús	Portugal	41:37
161	Dic Evans	Wales	41:39
162	Hans Koeleman	Netherlands	41:40
163	Keld Johnsen	Denmark	41:41
164	Jim Dingwall	Scotland	41:42
165	Werner Meier	Switzerland	41:45
166	Thomas Wessinghage	West Germany	41:47
167	Per Hoffmann	Denmark	41:49
168	Carlos Cabral	Portugal	41:50
169	Mick Morris	Wales	41:52
170	Kjell-Erik Ståhl	Sweden	42:01
171	Peter Pfeifenberger	Austria	42:02
172	Knut Kvalheim	Norway	42:03
173	Jim McGuinness	Northern Ireland	42:09
174	Allan Zachariasen	Denmark	42:17
175	Mauro Pappacena	Italy	42:21
176	Brian McSloy	Scotland	42:35
177	Ernie Cunningham	Northern Ireland	42:48
178	Palle Vestergaard	Denmark	42:49
179	Bo Nytofle	Denmark	42:50
180	Tom Annett	Northern Ireland	42:54
181	Arye Gamliel	Israel	42:58
182	Christer Hanell	Sweden	43:00
183	Samuel Doherty	Northern Ireland	43:06
184	Rudolf Altersberger	Austria	43:13
185	Jeffrey Matthews	Sweden	43:27
186	Peter Irvine	Northern Ireland	43:32
187	Nabil Choueiry	Lebanon	43:48
—	Gerhard Hartmann	Austria	DNF
—	Dietmar Millonig	Austria	DNF
—	Yehuda Zadok	Israel	DNF
—	Cándido Alario	Spain	DNF

==== Teams ====
Rank	Team	Points
1st place, gold medalist(s)	England: Julian Goater / 9; Mike McLeod / 14; Andy Holden / 20; Nick Rose / 21; Bernie Ford / 22; Nick Lees / 33; (Roy Bailey) / (37); (Ken Newton) / (73); (Barry Smith) / (89)	119
2nd place, silver medalist(s)	Ireland: John Treacy / 1; Danny McDaid / 11; Gerry Deegan / 43; Mick O'Shea / 46; Donal Walsh / 47; Tony Brien / 50; (Eamonn Coghlan) / (70); (Ray Treacy) / (79); (Eddie Leddy) / (127)	198
3rd place, bronze medalist(s)	Soviet Union: Aleksandr Antipov / 3; Leonid Moseyev / 18; Yuriy Mikhailov / 35; Enn Sellik / 38; Aleksandr Fedotkin / 48; Vladimir Merkushin / 68; (Valeriy Abramov) / (75)	210
4	West Germany: Frank Zimmermann / 8; Christoph Herle / 16; Hans-Jürgen Orthmann / 24; Michael Karst / 34; Klaus-Peter Hildenbrand / 63; Manfred Schoeneberg / 66; (Reinhard Leibold) / (85); (Detlef Uhlemann) / (121); (Thomas Wessinghage) / (166)	211
5	Belgium: Léon Schots / 5; Frank Grillaert / 19; Eric De Beck / 26; Eddy Van Mullem / 53; Willy Polleunis / 59; Hendrik Schoofs / 69; (Roger De Vogel) / (76); (Elie Aubertin) / (92); (Johan Geirnaert) / (159)	231
6	Australia: Steve Austin / 29; Gerard Barrett / 32; Bill Scott / 36; James Langford / 40; Brian Lewry / 45; Robert McDonald / 51; (Rob de Castella) / (62); (Chris Wardlaw) / (72); (David Chettle) / (120)	233
7	Poland: Bronisław Malinowski / 2; Bogusław Mamiński / 12; Maciej Kunicki / 23; Ryszard Kopijasz / 61; Zbigniew Pierzynka / 77; Eugeniusz Stacha / 145	320
8	United States: Craig Virgin / 13; Daniel Dillon / 44; Marc Hunter / 49; Bill Donakowski / 64; Robbie Perkins / 81; Greg Meyer / 90; (Steve Flanagan) / (101); (Bobb Thomas) / (137)	341
9	Spain: José Luis González / 15; Santiago de la Parte / 39; Antonio Prieto / 78; Constantino Esparcia / 80; José Luis Ruiz / 95; Estanislao Duran / 100; (José Haro) / (136); (José Manuel Abascal) / (152); (Cándido Alario) / (DNF)	407
10	Italy: Franco Fava / 27; Giuseppe Gerbi / 60; Claudio Solone / 65; Luigi Zarcone / 67; Gelindo Bordin / 93; Ennio Panetti / 106; (Piero Selvaggio) / (151); (Luigi Lauro) / (154); (Mauro Pappacena) / (175)	418
11	France: Alex Gonzalez / 25; Jean-Paul Gomez / 42; Francis Gonzalez / 54; Jean-Luc Paugam / 88; Guy Bourban / 103; Jean-Marie Conrath / 113; (Christian Cairoche) / (131); (Philippe Legrand) / (135); (Philippe Daniel) / (140)	425
12	Netherlands: Klaas Lok / 28; Gerard Tebroke / 30; Henk Mentink / 82; Tonni Luttikhold / 84; Piet Vonck / 116; Joost Borm / 118; (Gerard Nijboer) / (129); (Hans Koeleman) / (162)	458
13	New Zealand: Euan Robertson / 17; Kevin Ryan / 55; Howard Healey / 58; John Dixon / 87; Alan Thurlow / 111; Bruce Jones / 133; (Martin Couldwell) / (143); (Daniel O'Connell) / (150); (Jack Foster) / (155)	461
14	Scotland: Nat Muir / 10; John Robson / 52; Lawrie Spence / 74; Joseph Patton / 99; Allister Hutton / 105; Laurence Reilly / 146; (Gordon Rimmer) / (158); (Jim Dingwall) / (164); (Brian McSloy) / (176)	486
15	Wales: Tony Simmons / 4; Steve Jones / 7; Peter Baker / 107; Clive Thomas / 114; Edmund Turner / 130; John Davies / 141; (Roger Hackney) / (153); (Dic Evans) / (161); (Mick Morris) / (169)	503
16	Canada: Peter Butler / 56; Ron Vanderkraats / 86; Larry Brown / 96; Mike Dixon / 97; Greg Duhaime / 108; Art Boileau / 109; (Adam Shoemaker) / (112); (Peter Moore) / (119); (Rob Lonergan) / (134)	552
17	Switzerland: Pierre Délèze / 71; Fredi Griner / 83; Hugo Wey / 98; Guido Rhyn / 102; Jean-Pierre Berset / 104; Blaise Schull / 117; (Werner Meier) / (165)	575
18	Norway: Inge Simonsen / 57; Øyvind Dahl / 91; Jim Johansen / 110; Peder Arne Sylte / 115; Bjarte Sleire / 124; Knut Kvalheim / 172	669
19	Portugal: Fernando Mamede / 41; Aniceto Simoes / 94; Manuel Paiva / 122; José Sena / 132; José Simoes / 147; Helder de Jesús / 160; (Carlos Cabral) / (168)	696
20	Northern Ireland: Greg Hannon / 31; Rod Stone / 126; Cameron Spence / 144; Paul Lawther / 149; Jim McGuinness / 173; Ernie Cunningham / 177; (Tom Annett) / (180); (Samuel Doherty) / (183); (Peter Irvine) / (186)	800
21	Denmark: Karsten Hald Nielsen / 123; Jørn Lauenborg / 138; Niels Kim Hjorth / 156; Henning Rasmussen / 157; Keld Johnsen / 163; Per Hoffmann / 167; (Allan Zachariasen) / (174); (Palle Vestergaard) / (178); (Bo Nytofle) / (179)	904
DNF	Austria: (Peter Lindtner) / (125); (Josef Steiner) / (128); (Wolfgang Konrad) / (148); (Peter Pfeifenberger) / (171); (Rudolf Altersberger) / (184); (Gerhard Hartmann) / (DNF); (Dietmar Millonig) / (DNF)	DNF

- Note: Athletes in parentheses did not score for the team result

== Participation ==
An unofficial count yields the participation of 191 athletes from 26 countries in the Senior men's race. This is in agreement with the official numbers as published.

- Australia (9)
- Austria (7)
- Belgium (9)
- Canada (9)
- Czechoslovakia (1)
- Denmark (9)
- England (9)
- France (9)
- Ireland (9)
- Israel (2)
- Italy (9)
- Lebanon (1)
- Netherlands (8)
- New Zealand (9)
- Northern Ireland (9)
- Norway (6)
- Poland (6)
- Portugal (7)
- Scotland (9)
- Soviet Union (7)
- Spain (9)
- Sweden (5)
- Switzerland (7)
- United States (8)
- Wales (9)
- West Germany (9)

== See also ==
- 1979 IAAF World Cross Country Championships – Junior men's race
- 1979 IAAF World Cross Country Championships – Senior women's race
