= 1979 IAAF World Cross Country Championships =

- Organisers: IAAF
- Edition: 7th
- Date: 25 March
- Host city: Limerick, Munster, Ireland (Republic of Ireland)
- Venue: Greenpark Racecourse
- Events: 3
- Distances: 12 km – Senior men 7.36 km – Junior men 5.04 km – Senior women
- Participation: 383 athletes from 27 nations

The 1979 IAAF World Cross Country Championships was held in Limerick, Ireland, at the Greenpark Racecourse on 25 March 1979. A report on the event was given in the Glasgow Herald.

Complete results for men, junior men, women, medallists, and the results of British athletes were published.

== Medallists ==
Event	Gold		Silver		Bronze	
Individual
Senior men (12 km)	John Treacy; Ireland	37:20	Bronisław Malinowski; Poland	37:29	Aleksandr Antipov; Soviet Union	37:30
Junior men (7.36 km)	Eddy de Pauw; Belgium	23:02	Steve Binns; England	23:09	Ildar Denikeyev; Soviet Union	23:20
Senior women (5.04 km)	Grete Waitz; Norway	16:48	Raisa Smekhnova; Soviet Union	17:14	Ellison Goodall; United States	17:18
Team
Senior men	England	119	Ireland	198	Soviet Union	210
Junior men	Spain	57	England	74	Soviet Union	75
Senior women	United States	29	Soviet Union	48	England	68

== Race results ==
=== Senior men's race (12 km) ===
Individual race
Rank	Athlete	Country	Time
1st place, gold medalist(s)	John Treacy	Ireland	37:20
2nd place, silver medalist(s)	Bronisław Malinowski	Poland	37:29
3rd place, bronze medalist(s)	Aleksandr Antipov	Soviet Union	37:30
4	Tony Simmons	Wales	37:38
5	Léon Schots	Belgium	37:42
6	Vlastimil Zwiefelhofer	Czechoslovakia	37:45
7	Steve Jones	Wales	37:46
8	Frank Zimmermann	West Germany	37:48
9	Julian Goater	England	37:53
10	Nat Muir	Scotland	38:01
11	Danny McDaid	Ireland	38:02
12	Bogusław Mamiński	Poland	38:04
Full results

Teams
Rank	Team	Points
1st place, gold medalist(s)	England: Julian Goater / 9; Mike McLeod / 14; Andy Holden / 20; Nick Rose / 21; Bernie Ford / 22; Nick Lees / 33; (Roy Bailey) / (37); (Ken Newton) / (73); (Barry Smith) / (89)	119
2nd place, silver medalist(s)	Ireland: John Treacy / 1; Danny McDaid / 11; Gerry Deegan / 43; Mick O'Shea / 46; Donie Walsh / 47; Tony Brien / 50; (Eamonn Coghlan) / (70); (Ray Treacy) / (79); (Eddie Leddy) / (127)	198
3rd place, bronze medalist(s)	Soviet Union: Aleksandr Antipov / 3; Leonid Moseyev / 18; Yuriy Mikhailov / 35; Enn Sellik / 38; Aleksandr Fedotkin / 48; Vladimir Merkushin / 68; (Valeriy Abramov) / (75)	210
4	West Germany	211
5	Belgium	231
6	Australia	233
7	Poland	320
8	United States	341
Full results

- Note: Athletes in parentheses did not score for the team result

=== Junior men's race (7.36 km) ===
Individual race
Rank	Athlete	Country	Time
1st place, gold medalist(s)	Eddy de Pauw	Belgium	23:02
2nd place, silver medalist(s)	Steve Binns	England	23:09
3rd place, bronze medalist(s)	Ildar Denikeyev	Soviet Union	23:20
4	Jeff Nelson	United States	23:22
5	Ian Clarke	Canada	23:29
6	Roberto Antiga	Italy	23:31
7	Faisal Touzri	Tunisia	23:32
8	Jordi García	Spain	23:33
9	Ezequiel Canario	Portugal	23:34
10	Ian Campbell	Scotland	23:35
11	Alastair Douglas	Scotland	23:36
12	Jim Hill	United States	23:37
Full results

Teams
Rank	Team	Points
1st place, gold medalist(s)	Spain: Jordi García / 8; Pedro Garin / 14; Valentin Rodríguez / 17; José Maestra / 18; (José Manuel Boix) / (37); (Jordi Castelló) / (72)	57
2nd place, silver medalist(s)	England: Steve Binns / 2; Colin Moore / 15; Geoff Turnbull / 27; Dave Lewis / 30; (Steve Cram) / (36); (Sean Connolly) / (64)	74
3rd place, bronze medalist(s)	Soviet Union: Ildar Denikeyev / 3; Sergey Kiselyov / 16; Vladimir Bezlepkin / 25; Abdurachman Ibragimov / 31	75
4	Ireland	90
5	Italy	101
6	Scotland	101
7	United States	106
8	Canada	125
Full results

- Note: Athletes in parentheses did not score for the team result

=== Senior women's race (5.04 km) ===
Individual race
Rank	Athlete	Country	Time
1st place, gold medalist(s)	Grete Waitz	Norway	16:48
2nd place, silver medalist(s)	Raisa Smekhnova	Soviet Union	17:14
3rd place, bronze medalist(s)	Ellison Goodall	United States	17:18
4	Ellen Wessinghage	West Germany	17:23
5	Svetlana Ulmasova	Soviet Union	17:25
6	Mary Purcell	Ireland	17:26
7	Jan Merrill	United States	17:33
8	Julie Shea	United States	17:41
9	Ann Ford	England	17:42
10	Cristina Tomasini	Italy	17:46
11	Margaret Groos	United States	17:47
12	Giana Romanova	Soviet Union	17:48
Full results

Teams
Rank	Team	Points
1st place, gold medalist(s)	United States: Ellison Goodall / 3; Jan Merrill / 7; Julie Shea / 8; Margaret Groos / 11; (Jennifer White) / (19); (Julie Brown) / (36)	29
2nd place, silver medalist(s)	Soviet Union: Raisa Smekhnova / 2; Svetlana Ulmasova / 5; Giana Romanova / 12; Raisa Belusova / 29; (Raisa Sadreydinova) / (53)	48
3rd place, bronze medalist(s)	England: Ann Ford / 9; Penny Yule / 15; Paula Fudge / 17; Regina Joyce / 27; (Glynis Penny) / (32); (Ruth Smeeth) / (42)	68
4	West Germany	101
5	New Zealand	107
6	Norway	134
7	Ireland	136
8	France	141
Full results

- Note: Athletes in parentheses did not score for the team result

== Medal table (unofficial) ==
* Host nation (Ireland)

Rank	Nation	Gold	Silver	Bronze	Total
1	England (ENG)	1	2	1	4
2	Ireland (IRL)*	1	1	0	2
3	United States (USA)	1	0	1	2
4	Belgium (BEL)	1	0	0	1
4	Norway (NOR)	1	0	0	1
4	Spain (ESP)	1	0	0	1
7	Soviet Union (URS)	0	2	4	6
8	Poland (POL)	0	1	0	1
Totals (8 entries)		6	6	6	18

- Note: Totals include both individual and team medals, with medals in the team competition counting as one medal.

== Participation ==
An unofficial count yields the participation of 383 athletes from 27 countries. This is in agreement with the official numbers as published.

- Australia (11)
- Austria (7)
- Belgium (21)
- Canada (20)
- Czechoslovakia (1)
- Denmark (21)
- England (21)
- France (21)
- Ireland (21)
- Israel (4)
- Italy (21)
- Lebanon (1)
- Netherlands (11)
- New Zealand (15)
- Northern Ireland (21)
- Norway (11)
- Poland (6)
- Portugal (13)
- Scotland (21)
- Soviet Union (16)
- Spain (21)
- Sweden (5)
- Switzerland (7)
- Tunisia (6)
- United States (20)
- Wales (21)
- West Germany (19)

== See also ==
- 1979 IAAF World Cross Country Championships – Senior men's race
- 1979 IAAF World Cross Country Championships – Junior men's race
- 1979 IAAF World Cross Country Championships – Senior women's race
- 1979 in athletics (track and field)
