= 1979 IAAF World Cross Country Championships – Junior men's race =

Junior men's race at the 1979 IAAF World Cross Country Championships
- Organisers: IAAF
- Edition: 7th
- Date: 25 March
- Host city: Limerick, Munster, Ireland (Republic of Ireland)
- Venue: Greenpark Racecourse
- Events: 1
- Distances: 7.36 km – Junior men
- Participation: 92 athletes from 16 nations

The Junior men's race at the 1979 IAAF World Cross Country Championships was held in Limerick, Ireland, at the Greenpark Racecourse on 25 March 1979. A report on the event was given in the Glasgow Herald.

Complete results, medallists, and the results of British athletes were published.

== Race results ==
=== Junior men's race (7.36 km) ===
==== Individual ====
Rank	Athlete	Country	Time
1st place, gold medalist(s)	Eddy de Pauw	Belgium	23:02
2nd place, silver medalist(s)	Steve Binns	England	23:09
3rd place, bronze medalist(s)	Ildar Denikeyev	Soviet Union	23:20
4	Jeff Nelson	United States	23:22
5	Ian Clarke	Canada	23:29
6	Roberto Antiga	Italy	23:31
7	Faisal Touzri	Tunisia	23:32
8	Jordi García	Spain	23:33
9	Ezequiel Canario	Portugal	23:34
10	Ian Campbell	Scotland	23:35
11	Alastair Douglas	Scotland	23:36
12	Jim Hill	United States	23:37
13	Ronnie Carroll	Ireland	23:38
14	Pedro Garin	Spain	23:39
15	Colin Moore	England	23:40
16	Sergey Kiselyov	Soviet Union	23:41
17	Valentin Rodríguez	Spain	23:42
18	José Maestra	Spain	23:43
19	Andrea Prassedi	Italy	23:44
20	Paul Moloney	Ireland	23:45
21	Guy Léfèvre	Belgium	23:46
22	Denis Stark	Canada	23:47
23	Graham Williamson	Scotland	23:48
24	Herb Wills	United States	23:49
25	Vladimir Bezlepkin	Soviet Union	23:53
26	Jean-Louis Prianon	France	23:54
27	Geoff Turnbull	England	23:55
28	Brendan Quinn	Ireland	23:56
29	Brian O'Keefe	Ireland	23:58
30	Dave Lewis	England	23:59
31	Abdurachman Ibragimov	Soviet Union	24:01
32	Ulrich Renz	West Germany	24:03
33	James Fallon	Ireland	24:04
34	Mauro Perna	Italy	24:05
35	Pascal Debacker	France	24:06
36	Steve Cram	England	24:08
37	José Manuel Boix	Spain	24:10
38	Mohammed Chouri	Tunisia	24:11
39	Steven Snell	Canada	24:12
40	Herbert Renz	West Germany	24:13
41	Heinrich Kipp	Denmark	24:15
42	Antonio Zumbo	Italy	24:20
43	Peter Horak	West Germany	24:21
44	Jean-Luc Taif	France	24:22
45	Yazid Abnouri	France	24:23
46	Steve Blakemore	Wales	24:24
47	Carlos Pereira	Portugal	24:25
48	Habib Romdani	Tunisia	24:26
49	Erwin Nothelfer	West Germany	24:28
50	Jim Haughey	Northern Ireland	24:30
51	Howard Parsell	Wales	24:31
52	Eddy Stevens	Belgium	24:32
53	Henrik Jørgensen	Denmark	24:33
54	Paul Donovan	Ireland	24:34
55	Gerhard Lindner	West Germany	24:35
56	Sergio Lena	Italy	24:36
57	Peter Fox	Scotland	24:38
58	Peter Daenens	Belgium	24:40
59	Aldo Bartolini	Canada	24:42
60	Chris Buckley	Wales	24:43
61	Gabriele Bettati	Italy	24:44
62	Iain Hill	Northern Ireland	24:48
63	Luis Pinhal	Portugal	24:51
64	Sean Connolly	England	24:52
65	Abderrazak Gtari	Tunisia	24:53
66	John Gregorek	United States	24:54
67	Henrik Albahn	Denmark	24:55
68	David Kirk	Scotland	24:56
69	Tom Melville	Northern Ireland	24:57
70	Steen Christensen	Denmark	25:01
71	Mike Sheely	United States	25:02
72	Jordi Castelló	Spain	25:06
73	Luc de Koster	Belgium	25:08
74	Ewen Martin	Wales	25:10
75	Paul Lanfear	Wales	25:13
76	Sören Egge Rasmussen	Denmark	25:15
77	Dallas Alleire	Canada	25:16
78	John McCreedy	Northern Ireland	25:18
79	Alan Scharsu	United States	25:21
80	Serge Moro-Sibilot	France	25:21
81	Mohamed Hadj Gasmi	Tunisia	25:23
82	Tom Breen	Northern Ireland	25:27
83	Mohamed Salah Chebbi	Tunisia	25:39
84	Jos Maes	Belgium	25:42
85	Ieuan Ellis	Wales	25:43
86	Duncan McTavish	Scotland	25:54
87	João Campos	Portugal	25:58
88	Mickey Rooney	Northern Ireland	26:07
89	Jean-Baptiste Protais	France	26:14
90	Ove Jensen	Denmark	26:25
—	Antonio Leitão	Portugal	DNF
—	Eliseo Rios	Portugal	DNF

==== Teams ====
Rank	Team	Points
1st place, gold medalist(s)	Spain: Jordi García / 8; Pedro Garin / 14; Valentin Rodríguez / 17; José Maestra / 18; (José Manuel Boix) / (37); (Jordi Castelló) / (72)	57
2nd place, silver medalist(s)	England: Steve Binns / 2; Colin Moore / 15; Geoff Turnbull / 27; Dave Lewis / 30; (Steve Cram) / (36); (Sean Connolly) / (64)	74
3rd place, bronze medalist(s)	Soviet Union: Ildar Denikeyev / 3; Sergey Kiselyov / 16; Vladimir Bezlepkin / 25; Abdurachman Ibragimov / 31	75
4	Ireland: Ronnie Carroll / 13; Paul Moloney / 20; Brendan Quinn / 28; Brian O'Keefe / 29; (James Fallon) / (33); (Paul Donovan) / (54)	90
5	Italy: Roberto Antiga / 6; Andrea Prassedi / 19; Mauro Perna / 34; Antonio Zumbo / 42; (Sergio Lena) / (56); (Gabriele Bettati) / (61)	101
6	Scotland: Ian Campbell / 10; Alastair Douglas / 11; Graham Williamson / 23; Peter Fox / 57; (David Kirk) / (68); (Duncan McTavish) / (86)	101
7	United States: Jeff Nelson / 4; Jim Hill / 12; Herb Wills / 24; John Gregorek / 66; (Mike Sheely) / (71); (Alan Scharsu) / (79)	106
8	Canada: Ian Clarke / 5; Denis Stark / 22; Steven Snell / 39; Aldo Bartolini / 59; (Dallas Alleire) / (77)	125
9	Belgium: Eddy de Pauw / 1; Guy Léfèvre / 21; Eddy Stevens / 52; Peter Daenens / 58; (Luc de Koster) / (73); (Jos Maes) / (84)	132
10	France: Jean-Louis Prianon / 26; Pascal Debacker / 35; Jean-Luc Taif / 44; Yazid Abnouri / 45; (Serge Moro-Sibilot) / (80); (Jean-Baptiste Protais) / (89)	150
11	Tunisia: Faisal Touzri / 7; Mohammed Chouri / 38; Habib Romdani / 48; Abderrazak Gtari / 65; (Mohamed Hadj Gasmi) / (81); (Mohamed Salah Chebbi) / (83)	158
12	West Germany: Ulrich Renz / 32; Herbert Renz / 40; Peter Horak / 43; Erwin Nothelfer / 49; (Gerhard Lindner) / (55)	164
13	Portugal: Ezequiel Canario / 9; Carlos Pereira / 47; Luis Pinhal / 63; João Campos / 87; (Antonio Leitão) / (DNF); (Eliseo Rios) / (DNF)	206
14	Denmark: Heinrich Kipp / 41; Henrik Jørgensen / 53; Henrik Albahn / 67; Steen Christensen / 70; (Sören Egge Rasmussen) / (76); (Ove Jensen) / (90)	231
15	Wales: Steve Blakemore / 46; Howard Parsell / 51; Chris Buckley / 60; Ewen Martin / 74; (Paul Lanfear) / (75); (Ieuan Ellis) / (85)	231
16	Northern Ireland: Jim Haughey / 50; Iain Hill / 62; Tom Melville / 69; John McCreedy / 78; (Tom Breen) / (82); (Mickey Rooney) / (88)	259

- Note: Athletes in parentheses did not score for the team result

== Participation ==
An unofficial count yields the participation of 92 athletes from 16 countries in the Junior men's race. This is in agreement with the official numbers as published.

- Belgium (6)
- Canada (5)
- Denmark (6)
- England (6)
- France (6)
- Ireland (6)
- Italy (6)
- Northern Ireland (6)
- Portugal (6)
- Scotland (6)
- Soviet Union (4)
- Spain (6)
- Tunisia (6)
- United States (6)
- Wales (6)
- West Germany (5)

== See also ==
- 1979 IAAF World Cross Country Championships – Senior men's race
- 1979 IAAF World Cross Country Championships – Senior women's race
