= 1978 New York City Marathon =

Footrace held in New York City

- Date: 22 October
- Location: (United States) New York City, NY
- Event type: Marathon
- Distance: 42.195 km
- Edition: 9th
- Course records: 2:10:09 (1976 men); 2:32:30 (1978 women)
- Website: Official website

The 1978 New York City Marathon was the 9th edition of the New York City Marathon and took place in New York City on 22 October.

== Results ==
=== Men ===
Rank	Athlete	Country	Time
1	Bill Rodgers	United States	2:12:11
2	Ian Thompson	United Kingdom	2:14:12
3	Trevor Wright	United Kingdom	2:14:35
4	Marco Marchei	Italy	2:16:54
5	Thomas Antczak	United States	2:17:11
6	Jack Foster	New Zealand	2:17:28
7	Chris Stewart	United Kingdom	2:17:47
8	William Haviland	United States	2:18:39
9	Franco Ambrosioni	Italy	2:19:08
10	William Sieben	United States	2:19:11

=== Women ===
Rank	Athlete	Country	Time
1	Grete Waitz	Norway	2:32:30
2	Marty Cooksey	United States	2:41:49
3	Sue Petersen	United States	2:44:43
4	Doreen Ennis	United States	2:46:38
5	Eleonora de Mendonca	Brazil	2:48:45
6	Margaret Lockley	United Kingdom	2:50:58
7	Nancy Schafer	United States	2:52:20
8	Carol Young	United States	2:52:28
9	Glynis Penny	United Kingdom	2:53:35
10	Deborah Butterfield	United States	2:53:42
