= 1979 IAAF World Cross Country Championships – Senior women's race =

Senior women's race at the 1979 IAAF World Cross Country Championships
- Organisers: IAAF
- Edition: 7th
- Date: 25 March
- Host city: Limerick, Munster, Ireland (Republic of Ireland)
- Venue: Greenpark Racecourse
- Events: 1
- Distances: 5.04 km – Senior women
- Participation: 100 athletes from 19 nations

The Senior women's race at the 1979 IAAF World Cross Country Championships was held in Limerick, Ireland, at the Greenpark Racecourse on 25 March 1979. A report on the event was given in the Glasgow Herald.

Complete results, medallists, and the results of British athletes were published.

== Race results ==
=== Senior women's race (5.04 km) ===
==== Individual ====
Rank	Athlete	Country	Time
1st place, gold medalist(s)	Grete Waitz	Norway	16:48
2nd place, silver medalist(s)	Raisa Smekhnova	Soviet Union	17:14
3rd place, bronze medalist(s)	Ellison Goodall	United States	17:18
4	Ellen Wessinghage	West Germany	17:23
5	Svetlana Ulmasova	Soviet Union	17:25
6	Mary Purcell	Ireland	17:26
7	Jan Merrill	United States	17:33
8	Julie Shea	United States	17:41
9	Ann Ford	England	17:42
10	Cristina Tomasini	Italy	17:46
11	Margaret Groos	United States	17:47
12	Giana Romanova	Soviet Union	17:48
13	Debbie Scott	Canada	17:48
14	Anne Audain	New Zealand	17:49
15	Penny Yule	England	17:50
16	Sabine Ladurner	Italy	17:57
17	Paula Fudge	England	17:58
18	Dorthe Rasmussen	Denmark	18:02
19	Jennifer White	United States	18:02
20	Heather Thomson	New Zealand	18:05
21	Marleen Mols	Belgium	18:06
22	Joëlle De Brouwer	France	18:08
23	Ingrid Kristiansen	Norway	18:10
24	Véronique Renties	France	18:11
25	Pilar Fernandez	Spain	18:12
26	Elvira Hofmann	West Germany	18:14
27	Regina Joyce	England	18:15
28	Charlotte Teske	West Germany	18:16
29	Raisa Belusova	Soviet Union	18:17
30	Deirdre Nagle	Ireland	18:18
31	Carla Beurskens	Netherlands	18:23
32	Glynis Penny	England	18:24
33	Iciar Martinez	Spain	18:26
34	Mary O'Connor	New Zealand	18:27
35	Connie Olsen	Denmark	18:28
36	Julie Brown	United States	18:31
37	Kersti Jakobsen	Denmark	18:31
38	Diane Cameron	Canada	18:32
39	Lorraine Moller	New Zealand	18:34
40	Lynne Williams	Australia	18:35
41	Mona Kleppe	Norway	18:38
42	Ruth Smeeth	England	18:39
43	Heide Brenner	West Germany	18:41
44	Judith Shepherd	Scotland	18:43
45	Shauna Miller	Canada	18:44
46	Chantal Navarro	France	18:45
47	Magda Ilands	Belgium	18:46
48	Fionnuala Morrish	Ireland	18:47
49	Jacqueline Lefeuvre	France	18:48
50	Encarnación Escudero	Spain	18:49
51	Gaylene Clews	Australia	18:50
52	Christine Ward	Ireland	18:51
53	Raisa Sadreydinova	Soviet Union	18:52
54	Zehava Shmueli	Israel	18:53
55	Veronica Duffy	Ireland	18:54
56	Barbara Moore	New Zealand	18:55
57	Fiona McQueen	Scotland	18:56
58	Asuncion Sinobas	Spain	18:56
59	Brigit de Nijs	Netherlands	18:58
60	Francine Peeters	Belgium	18:59
61	Margherita Gargano	Italy	19:01
62	Elena Rastello	Italy	19:02
63	Marie-Christine Christiaens	Belgium	19:03
64	Ann-Marie Keown	New Zealand	19:04
65	Christine Seeman	France	19:05
66	Maureen Crowley	Canada	19:06
67	Kerry Robinson	Scotland	19:07
68	Denise Verhaert	Belgium	19:08
69	Heidi Meier	Norway	19:11
70	Karin de Nijs	Netherlands	19:14
71	Birgit Friedmann	West Germany	19:18
72	Nadine Claes	Belgium	19:20
73	Susan Olsen	Denmark	19:21
74	Amelia Lorza Lopez	Spain	19:22
75	Kathy d'Arcy	Canada	19:27
76	Hilary Hollick	Wales	19:32
77	Anette Hansen	Denmark	19:38
78	Mercedes Calleja	Spain	19:40
79	Kate Davis	Ireland	19:43
80	Anat Meiri	Israel	19:45
81	Kim Lock	Wales	19:46
82	Margaret Coomber	Scotland	19:49
83	Jean Lochhead	Wales	19:50
84	Bronwen Smith	Wales	19:52
85	May-Britt Stange	Norway	19:53
86	Anna James	Wales	19:54
87	Christine Iceaga	France	20:06
88	Joyce Mehaffey	Northern Ireland	20:11
89	Angela McCullagh	Northern Ireland	20:12
90	Lynn Kanuka	Canada	20:19
91	Violet Hope	Scotland	20:20
92	Carol Nicholas	Wales	20:31
93	Elizabeth Trotter	Scotland	20:47
94	Charlotte Kaagh	Denmark	21:11
95	Susan Beattie	Northern Ireland	21:20
96	Roberta Brown	Northern Ireland	21:21
97	Avril McClung	Northern Ireland	21:31
98	Margaret Gallen	Northern Ireland	22:19
—	Gabriella Dorio	Italy	DNF
—	Agnese Possamai	Italy	DNF

==== Teams ====
Rank	Team	Points
1st place, gold medalist(s)	United States: Ellison Goodall / 3; Jan Merrill / 7; Julie Shea / 8; Margaret Groos / 11; (Jennifer White) / (19); (Julie Brown) / (36)	29
2nd place, silver medalist(s)	Soviet Union: Raisa Smekhnova / 2; Svetlana Ulmasova / 5; Giana Romanova / 12; Raisa Belusova / 29; (Raisa Sadreydinova) / (53)	48
3rd place, bronze medalist(s)	England: Ann Ford / 9; Penny Yule / 15; Paula Fudge / 17; Regina Joyce / 27; (Glynis Penny) / (32); (Ruth Smeeth) / (42)	68
4	West Germany: Ellen Wessinghage / 4; Elvira Hofmann / 26; Charlotte Teske / 28; Heide Brenner / 43; (Birgit Friedmann) / (71)	101
5	New Zealand: Anne Audain / 14; Heather Thomson / 20; Mary O'Connor / 34; Lorraine Moller / 39; (Barbara Moore) / (56); (Ann-Marie Keown) / (64)	107
6	Norway: Grete Waitz / 1; Ingrid Christensen / 23; Mona Kleppe / 41; Heidi Meier / 69; (May-Britt Stange) / (85)	134
7	Ireland: Mary Purcell / 6; Deirdre Nagle / 30; Fionnuala Morrish / 48; Christine Ward / 52; (Veronica Duffy) / (55); (Kate Davis) / (79)	136
8	France: Joëlle De Brouwer / 22; Véronique Renties / 24; Chantal Navarro / 46; Jacqueline Lefeuvre / 49; (Christine Seeman) / (65); (Christine Iceaga) / (87)	141
9	Italy: Cristina Tomasini / 10; Sabine Ladurner / 16; Margherita Gargano / 61; Elena Rastello / 62; (Gabriella Dorio) / (DNF); (Agnese Possamai) / (DNF)	149
10	Canada: Debbie Scott / 13; Jean Cameron / 38; Shauna Miller / 45; Maureen Crowley / 66; (Kathy d'Arcy) / (75); (Lynn Kanuka) / (90)	162
11	Denmark: Dorthe Rasmussen / 18; Connie Olsen / 35; Kersti Jakobsen / 37; Susan Olsen / 73; (Anette Hansen) / (77); (Charlotte Kaagh) / (94)	163
12	Spain: Pilar Fernandez / 25; Iciar Martinez / 33; Encarnación Escudero / 50; Asuncion Sinobas / 58; (Amelia Lorza Lopez) / (74); (Mercedes Calleja) / (78)	166
13	Belgium: Marleen Mols / 21; Magda Ilands / 47; Francine Peeters / 60; Marie-Christine Christiaens / 63; (Denise Verhaert) / (68); (Nadine Claes) / (72)	191
14	Scotland: Judith Shepherd / 44; Fiona McQueen / 57; Kerry Robinson / 67; Margaret Coomber / 82; (Violet Hope) / (91); (Elizabeth Trotter) / (93)	250
15	Wales: Hilary Hollick / 76; Kim Lock / 81; Jean Lochhead / 83; Bronwen Smith / 84; (Anna James) / (86); (Carol Nicholas) / (92)	324
16	Northern Ireland: Joyce Mehaffey / 88; Angela McCullagh / 89; Susan Beattie / 95; Roberta Brown / 96; (Avril McClung) / (97); (Margaret Gallen) / (98)	368

- Note: Athletes in parentheses did not score for the team result

== Participation ==
An unofficial count yields the participation of 100 athletes from 19 countries in the Senior women's race. This is in agreement with the official numbers as published.

- Australia (2)
- Belgium (6)
- Canada (6)
- Denmark (6)
- England (6)
- France (6)
- Ireland (6)
- Israel (2)
- Italy (6)
- Netherlands (3)
- New Zealand (6)
- Northern Ireland (6)
- Norway (5)
- Scotland (6)
- Soviet Union (5)
- Spain (6)
- United States (6)
- Wales (6)
- West Germany (5)

== See also ==
- 1979 IAAF World Cross Country Championships – Senior men's race
- 1979 IAAF World Cross Country Championships – Junior men's race
