= Athletics at the 1980 Summer Olympics – Men's 5000 metres =

Men's 5000 metres at the Games of the XXII Olympiad
- Venue: Lenin Central Stadium
- Dates: 28 July 1980 (qualification); 30 July 1980 (semi-finals); 1 August 1980 (final)
- Competitors: 37 from 24 nations
- Winning time: 13:21.0

Medalists
1st place, gold medalist(s)		Miruts Yifter; Ethiopia
2nd place, silver medalist(s)		Suleiman Nyambui; Tanzania
3rd place, bronze medalist(s)		Kaarlo Maaninka; Finland

These are the official results of the Men's 5000 metres event at the 1980 Summer Olympics in Moscow, Soviet Union. There were a total number of 34 participating athletes, with the final held on Friday 1 August 1980.

== Records ==
These were the standing world and Olympic records (in minutes) prior to the 1980 Summer Olympics.

World record	13:08.4	(Kenya) Henry Rono	Berkeley United States	April 8, 1978
Olympic record	13:20.34	(United Kingdom) Brendan Foster	Montreal (Canada)	July 28, 1976

== Results ==
=== Final ===
- Held on Friday 1 August 1980

The only Soviet runner to qualify for this final, Aleksandr Fyodotkin, set a quick early pace, leading the field at 1,000 metres in 2:38.4. At 1,100 metres, Ethiopia's Mohammed Kedir moved into the lead, slowing the pace in order to conserve his famous team mate Miruts Yifter's final kick power. Kedir led the twelve-man group at 2,000 metres in 5:22.9 and at 3,000 metres in 8:08.1. Finland's Kaarlo Maaninka took the lead just before 3,400 metres, slightly improving the pace. However, all the twelve runners were still in contention at 4,000 metres, which Maaninka reached in 10:51.1. After 4,300 metres, this race's third Ethiopian runner, Yohannes Mohammed, sprinted into the lead. After 4,400 metres, Fyodotkin passed Mohammed. On the second last home straight, Kedir returned to the lead. At this point, the field began to break up, with Finland's Martti Vainio dropping from the lead group, and Czechoslovakia's Jirí Sýkora, Ireland's John Treacy and Austria's Dietmar Millonig having to struggle to remain in the lead group. Kedir's informal 4,600-metre split was 12:25.89. He led the field into the final back straight, but then Ireland's Eamonn Coghlan rushed into the lead. Kedir and Mohammed moved outward, to give room to their famous team mate, Yifter, who then began his explosive final kick. Accidentally Kedir and Mohammed collided on the final back straight, with Kedir falling and Mohammed stumbling badly. Only Coghlan, Tanzania's Suleiman Nyambui, Switzerland's Markus Ryffel, and Finland's Kaarlo Maaninka were able to accelerate with Yifter. Further behind, Millonig was passing runners and approaching Treacy and Fyodotkin. On the final bend, Yifter began to pull away from Coghlan, while Nyambui passed the fading Irish runner. At the end of the bend, Maaninka sprinted past Ryffel. On the home straight, Yifter increased somewhat his lead over Nyambui, while Maaninka passed Coghlan to claim the bronze medal. One second behind the Finn, Millonig passed Treacy and Fyodotkin. Sýkora placed ninth, while Mohammed, Vainio and Kedir faded badly in the last 200 metres. (The Great Olympic Book / Suuri Olympiateos, volume 3, Finland, 1980; The Moscow Olympic Book / Moskovan olympiakirja, Finland, 1980; four YouTube videos on this final.)

RANK	FINAL	TIME
	Miruts Yifter (ETH)	13:21.0
	Suleiman Nyambui (TAN)	13:21.6
	Kaarlo Maaninka (FIN)	13:22.0
4.	Eamonn Coghlan (IRL)	13:22.8
5.	Markus Ryffel (SUI)	13:23.1
6.	Dietmar Millonig (AUT)	13:23.3
7.	John Treacy (IRL)	13:23.7
8.	Aleksandr Fyodotkin (URS)	13:24.1
9.	Jiří Sýkora (TCH)	13:25.0
10.	Yohannes Mohamed (ETH)	13:28.4
11.	Martti Vainio (FIN)	13:32.1
12.	Mohamed Kedir (ETH)	13:34.2

=== Semi-finals ===
- Held on Wednesday 30 July 1980

RANK	HEAT 1	TIME
1.	Yohannes Mohamed (ETH)	13:39.4
2.	Miruts Yifter (ETH)	13:40.0
3.	Kaarlo Maaninka (FIN)	13:40.2
4.	John Treacy (IRL)	13:40.3
5.	Nick Rose (GBR)	13:40.6
6.	Valeriy Abramov (URS)	13:40.7
7.	Zakariah Barie (TAN)	13:44.9
8.	Emiel Puttemans (BEL)	13:50.2
9.	David Moorcroft (GBR)	13:58.2
10.	David Fitzsimons (AUS)	13:58.3
11.	Hansjörg Kunze (GDR)	14:00.3
12.	Enrique Aquino (MEX)	14:01.4

RANK	HEAT 2	TIME
1.	Mohamed Kedir (ETH)	13:28.6
2.	Eamonn Coghlan (IRL)	13:28.8
3.	Markus Ryffel (SUI)	13:29.3
4.	Dietmar Millonig (AUT)	13:29.4
5.	Suleiman Nyambui (TAN)	13:30.2
6.	Martti Vainio (FIN)	13:30.4
7.	Jiří Sýkora (TCH)	13:31.0
8.	Aleksandr Fyodotkin (URS)	13:31.9
9.	Barry Smith (GBR)	13:36.7
10.	Alex Hagelsteens (BEL)	13:46.7
11.	Steve Austin (AUS)	13:47.6
12.	El Hachemi Abdenouz (ALG)	14:15.9

=== Heats ===
- Held on Monday 28 July 1980

RANK	HEAT 1	TIME
1.	Miruts Yifter (ETH)	13:44.4
2.	Hansjörg Kunze (GDR)	13:44.4
3.	Nick Rose (GBR)	13:44.7
4.	John Treacy (IRL)	13:44.8
5.	Alex Hagelsteens (BEL)	13:44.9
6.	Aleksandr Fedotkin (URS)	13:45.6
7.	Dave Fitzsimons (AUS)	13:46.4
8.	Enrique Aquino (MEX)	13:48.9
9.	Gopal Saini (IND)	14:06.6
10.	Robert Chideka (BOT)	14:47.2
11.	Laxman Basnet (NEP)	16:11.7

RANK	HEAT 2	TIME
1.	El-Hachemi Abdenouz (ALG)	13:42.1
2.	Mohamed Kedir (ETH)	13:42.7
3.	Valeriy Abramov (URS)	13:42.9
4.	Emiel Puttemans (BEL)	13:43.0
5.	David Moorcroft (GBR)	13:43.0
6.	Jiří Sýkora (TCH)	13:43.1
7.	Steve Austin (AUS)	13:43.2
8.	Martti Vainio (FIN)	13:45.2
9.	Zakariah Barie (TAN)	13:49.9
10.	Mick O'Shea (IRL)	14:03.0
11.	Bernardo Manuel (ANG)	14:51.4
12.	Saleh El-Ali (SYR)	15:08.2

RANK	HEAT 3	TIME
1.	Markus Ryffel (SUI)	13:45.0
2.	Suleiman Nyambui (TAN)	13:45.4
3.	Eamonn Coghlan (IRL)	13:45.4
4.	Dietmar Millonig (AUT)	13:45.7
5.	Yohannes Mohamed (ETH)	13:45.8
6.	Kaarlo Maaninka (FIN)	13:45.8
7.	Barry Smith (GBR)	13:46.3
8.	Enn Sellik (URS)	13:52.4
9.	Rachid Habchaoui (ALG)	13:59.9
10.	Zephaniah Ncube (ZIM)	14:06.7
11.	Pedro Mulomo (MOZ)	15:11.9
12.	Amadou Alimi (BEN)	15:44.0

== See also ==
- 1982 Men's European Championships 5000 metres (Athens)
- 1986 Men's European Championships 5000 metres (Stuttgart)
