= Roberta Brown =

Roberta Brown is the name of

- Roberta Brown (javelin thrower) (1947–1981), American javelin thrower
- Roberta Brown (long-distance runner) (born 1963), British long-distance runner in 1979 IAAF World Cross Country Championships – Senior women's race
- Roberta Brown (swordmaster) (born 1965), American swordmaster and actress
- Roberta Brown, Miss Ireland 1982
