= Marchei =

Marchei is an Italian surname. Notable people with the surname include:

- Marco Marchei (born 1954), Italian long-distance runner
- Valentina Marchei (born 1986), Italian figure skater
