= Anthony Simmons =

Anthony Simmons is the name of:

- Anthony Simmons (writer) (1922–2016), British writer and film director
- Anthony Simmons (American football) (born 1976), former NFL linebacker
- Anthony Simmons, called Tony Simmons (athlete) (born 1948), Welsh and English athlete

== See also ==
- Tony Simmons (disambiguation)
- Anfernee Simons (born 1999), American basketball player
