= Tony Simmons =

Tony Simmons may refer to:

- Tony Simmons (wide receiver) (born 1974), former National Football and Canadian Football League wide receiver, current American football coach internationally
- Tony Simmons (runner) (born 1948), British athlete
- Tony Simmons (defensive end) (born 1962), former National Football and Canadian Football League defensive end

== See also ==
- Anthony Simmons (disambiguation)
