= Papetti =

Papetti is an Italian surname. Notable people with the surname include:

- Alessandro Papetti (born 1958), Italian painter
- Andrea Papetti (born 2002), Italian professional footballer
- Fausto Papetti (1923 – 1999), Italian alto saxophone player
- Pietro Papetti (born 1999), Italian ice dancer

== See also ==
- Panetti
