= Ray Treacy =

Ray Treacy may refer to:

- Ray Treacy (footballer)
- Ray Treacy (track and field)
