= Paul Moloney =

Paul Moloney may refer to

- Paul Moloney (born 1978), Irish Jockey, see 2010 Grand National
- Paul Moloney (athlete), see 1979 IAAF World Cross Country Championships – Junior men's race
- Paul Moloney (golfer), see Singapore Open (golf)
- Paul Moloney (director), see Crackerjack (2002 film)

== See also ==
- Paul Maloney (disambiguation)
