= 1983 World Championships in Athletics – Men's 5000 metres =

Men's 5000 metres at the 1983 World Championships
- Venue: Helsinki Olympic Stadium
- Dates: 10 August (heats); 12 August (semi-finals); 14 August (final)
- Competitors: 39
- Winning time: 13:28.53 CR

Medalists
| gold medal | Eamonn Coghlan | Ireland |
| silver medal | Werner Schildhauer | East Germany |
| bronze medal | Martti Vainio | Finland |

These are the official results of the men's 5000 metres event at the 1983 IAAF World Championships in Helsinki, Finland. There were a total of 39 participating athletes, with three qualifying heats, two semi-finals and the final held on Sunday 14 August 1983.

== Records ==
Existing records at the start of the event.

| World Record | David Moorcroft (GBR) | 13:00.41 | Oslo, Norway | July 7, 1982 |
| Championship Record | New event | | | |

== Results ==
=== Qualifying heats ===
The qualifying heats took place on 10 August, with the 39 athletes involved being split into 3 heats. The first 8 athletes in each heat ( Q ) and the next 6 fastest ( q ) qualified for the semifinals.

Heat 1

| Rank | Name | Nationality | Time | Notes |
|---|---|---|---|---|
| 1 | Markus Ryffel | Switzerland | 13:43.36 | Q, CR |
| 2 | Wodajo Bulti | Ethiopia | 13:43.53 | Q |
| 3 | Eamonn Martin | Great Britain & N.I. | 13:43.57 | Q |
| 4 | Thomas Wessinghage | West Germany | 13:43.66 | Q |
| 5 | Anatoliy Krokhmalyuk | Soviet Union | 13:43.78 | Q |
| 6 | Salvatore Antibo | Italy | 13:44.05 | Q |
| 7 | Charles Cheruiyot | Kenya | 13:44.43 | Q |
| 8 | Doug Padilla | United States | 13:44.71 | Q |
| 9 | Filippos Filippou | Greece | 13:45.24 | q |
| 10 | Abderrazak Bounour | Algeria | 13:57.93 | q |
| 11 | Justin Gloden | Luxembourg | 14:26.02 | q |
| 12 | Mohamed Bakheet | Palestine | 14:52.26 | |
| 13 | Ramón López | Paraguay | 15:10.29 | |

Heat 2

| Rank | Name | Nationality | Time | Notes |
|---|---|---|---|---|
| 1 | Paul Kipkoech | Kenya | 14:18.73 | Q |
| 2 | Fethi Baccouche | Tunisia | 14:23.79 | Q |
| 3 | Julian Goater | Great Britain & N.I. | 14:23.93 | Q |
| 4 | António Leitão | Portugal | 14:28.63 | Q |
| 5 | Dmitriy Dmitriyev | Soviet Union | 14:37.75 | Q |
| 6 | Ronald Lanzoni | Costa Rica | 14:49.20 | Q |
| 7 | Werner Schildhauer | East Germany | 14:49.22 | Q |
| 8 | Jim Hill | United States | 14:58.21 | Q |
| 9 | Antoine Nivyobizi | Burundi | 15:14.60 | |
| 10 | José Jaime Hernández | El Salvador | 15:29.86 | |
| 11 | Alden Morris | Turks and Caicos Islands | 18:06.35 | |
| | Christoph Herle | West Germany | | DNS |
| | Mohamed Kedir | Ethiopia | | DNS |

Heat 3

| Rank | Name | Nationality | Time | Notes |
|---|---|---|---|---|
| 1 | Valeriy Abramov | Soviet Union | 14:12.61 | Q |
| 2 | Seyoum Nigatu | Ethiopia | 14:13.22 | Q |
| 3 | Dietmar Millonig | Austria | 14:13.65 | Q |
| 4 | Eamonn Coghlan | Ireland | 14:13.80 | Q |
| 5 | Dave Clarke | Great Britain & N.I. | 14:13.97 | Q |
| 6 | Jorge García | Spain | 14:14.57 | Q |
| 7 | Paul Williams | Canada | 14:15.10 | Q |
| 8 | Jim Spivey | United States | 14:15.70 | Q |
| 9 | Ricardo Vera | Uruguay | 14:17.26 | q |
| 10 | Kenji Ide | Japan | 14:18.34 | q |
| 11 | Martti Vainio | Finland | 14:18.74 | q |
| 12 | Masini Situ-Kubanza | Zaire (ZAI) | 15:02.26 | |
| | Hansjörg Kunze | East Germany | | DNS |

=== Semifinals ===
The semifinals took place on 12 August, with the 30 athletes involved being split into 2 heats. The first 5 athletes in each heat ( Q ) and the next 5 fastest ( q ) qualified for the final.

| Rank | Name | Nationality | Time | Notes |
|---|---|---|---|---|
| 1 | Markus Ryffel | Switzerland | 13:32.34 | Q, CR |
| 2 | Thomas Wessinghage | West Germany | 13:32.37 | Q |
| 3 | Werner Schildhauer | East Germany | 13:32.49 | Q |
| 4 | Dietmar Millonig | Austria | 13:32.86 | Q |
| 5 | Doug Padilla | United States | 13:32.90 | Q |
| 6 | Paul Kipkoech | Kenya | 13:33.33 | q |
| 7 | Julian Goater | Great Britain & N.I. | 13:36.21 | q |
| 8 | Anatoliy Krokhmalyuk | Soviet Union | 13:37.24 | q |
| 9 | Filippos Filippou | Greece | 13:40.81 | |
| 10 | Paul Williams | Canada | 13:50.30 | |
| 11 | Dave Clarke | Great Britain & N.I. | 13:58.37 | |
| 12 | Seyoum Nigatu | Ethiopia | 14:02.23 | |
| 13 | Kenji Ide | Japan | 14:04.94 | |
| 14 | Justin Gloden | Luxembourg | 14:12.25 | |
| 15 | Ronald Lanzoni | Costa Rica | 14:47.30 | |

Heat 2

| Rank | Name | Nationality | Time | Notes |
|---|---|---|---|---|
| 1 | Dmitriy Dmitriyev | Soviet Union | 13:31.40 | Q, CR |
| 2 | Eamonn Coghlan | Ireland | 13:31.66 | Q |
| 3 | António Leitão | Portugal | 13:32.33 | Q |
| 4 | Wodajo Bulti | Ethiopia | 13:33.03 | Q |
| 5 | Salvatore Antibo | Italy | 13:33.12 | Q |
| 6 | Valeriy Abramov | Soviet Union | 13:33.37 | q |
| 7 | Martti Vainio | Finland | 13:34.18 | q |
| 8 | Jim Hill | United States | 13:38.56 | |
| 9 | Jim Spivey | United States | 13:43.17 | |
| 10 | Jorge García | Spain | 13:46.36 | |
| 11 | Eamonn Martin | Great Britain & N.I. | 13:48.60 | |
| 12 | Charles Cheruiyot | Kenya | 13:52.61 | |
| 13 | Abderrazak Bounour | Algeria | 14:00.78 | |
| 14 | Fethi Baccouche | Tunisia | 14:19.64 | |
| 15 | Ricardo Vera | Uruguay | 14:20.20 | |

=== Final ===
As in most other major international championships, also this 5,000-metre final was mostly slow and tactical. The Soviet Union's Anatoliy Krokhmaliuk led at 1,000 metres in 2:43.30. During the second kilometre, he and his team mate Dmitriy Dmitriyev alternated in the lead, with Dmitriyev clocking 5:34.15 at 2,000 metres. One lap later, Britain's Julian Goater suddenly accelerated, but over 200 metres after the start of his surge, Dmitriyev caught him. Soon thereafter, Dmitriyev again took the lead, and clocked 8:19.52 at 3,000 metres. During the fourth kilometre, Dmitriyev, Ethiopia's Wodajo Bulti, and Switzerland's Markus Ryffel took turns leading the race. With over three laps left, Krokhmaliuk dropped from the lead group. Bulti took the lead for the second and the last time just before 4,000 metres, which he passed in 11:03.27. At the start of the third-last home straight, Dmitriyev accelerated past Bulti. West Germany's Thomas Wessinghage and Ireland's Eamonn Coghlan positioned themselves behind Dmitriyev and Bulti. With two laps left, twelve men were still in the lead group, with Goater and Italy's Salvatore Antibo having dropped from Dmitriyev's pace. On the second-last back straight, the Soviet Union's Valeriy Abramov lost contact with the lead group. Dmitriyev launched his final kick's decisive stage at 4,400 metres. Immediately Ryffel, Portugal's Antonio Leitao, and Austria's Dietmar Millonig dropped from Dmitriyev's pace. At the start of the second-last home straight, Dmitriyev was already sprinting about five metres ahead of Bulti. Later on that home straight, Wessinghage and Coghlan kicked past Bulti, and Coghlan passed Wessinghage. At 4,600 metres, Dmitriyev led in about 12:30. In other words, he had sprinted the second-last lap in about 57 seconds! Coghlan was running about six or seven metres behind this Soviet runner, with Wessinghage, Bulti, Finland's Martti Vainio, the United States' Doug Padilla, East Germany's Werner Schildhauer, and Kenya's Paul Kipkoech still in the lead group. To the surprise of many spectators, Wessinghage dropped from Coghlan's pace on the final lap's front bend. This astonishing event - Wessinghage was a world-class runner at both 1,500 and 5,000 metres - probably inspired Vainio to start his final kick, and to pass Bulti. Further back, Kipkoech dropped from Padilla's and Schildhauer's pace. Early on the final back straight, Coghlan easily caught the tiring Dmitriyev. Vainio kicked past the exhausted Wessinghage. At 4,800 metres, Dmitriyev and Coghlan were running about nine metres ahead of Vainio. On the final bend, Schildhauer passed Padilla and Wessinghage, and dashed after Vainio. Coghlan triumphantly raised his right hand, glanced at the worn out Dmitriyev, and then began his final sprint. By the start of the home straight, Coghlan had already stretched his lead over Dmitriyev to four metres. Vainio was sprinting ten metres behind the Irishman, while Schildhauer was kicking a couple of metres behind the Finn. On the final home straight, without even sprinting as fast as he could, Coghlan moved into a wide lead, crossing the finish line in 13:28.53. In other words, he had run the final 1,000 metres in 2:24.77! Schildhauer passed Vainio with about 25 metres left, and caught Dmitriyev over 10 metres later. The exhausted Soviet runner was no match for the fast-finishing East German. Vainio leaned forward, and lunged across the finish line, crossing it just 0.04 seconds before Dmitriyev. Two of the strongest pre-race favourites, Padilla and Wessinghage, had to settle for the fifth and sixth places, respectively. (The World Track and Field Championships / Yleisurheilun MM-kisat 1983, the Juoksija-lehti / Runner Magazine, Helsinki, Finland, 1983; another book on the IAAF World Championships 1983; https://www.youtube.com/watch?v=uIy0Jpm9moE&t=510s Eamonn Coghlan - World Athletics Championship 5000m Gold, Helsinki 1983.)

The final took place on August 14.

| Rank | Name | Nationality | Time | Notes |
|---|---|---|---|---|
| 1st place, gold medalist(s) | Eamonn Coghlan | Ireland | 13:28.53 | CR |
| 2nd place, silver medalist(s) | Werner Schildhauer | East Germany | 13:30.20 | |
| 3rd place, bronze medalist(s) | Martti Vainio | Finland | 13:30.34 | |
| 4 | Dmitriy Dmitriyev | Soviet Union | 13:30.38 | |
| 5 | Doug Padilla | United States | 13:32.08 | |
| 6 | Thomas Wessinghage | West Germany | 13:32.46 | |
| 7 | Wodajo Bulti | Ethiopia | 13:34.03 | |
| 8 | Dietmar Millonig | Austria | 13:36.08 | |
| 9 | Paul Kipkoech | Kenya | 13:37.44 | |
| 10 | António Leitão | Portugal | 13:38.55 | |
| 11 | Valeriy Abramov | Soviet Union | 13:39.80 | |
| 12 | Markus Ryffel | Switzerland | 13:39.98 | |
| 13 | Salvatore Antibo | Italy | 13:40.76 | |
| 14 | Julian Goater | Great Britain & N.I. | 13:48.13 | |
| 15 | Anatoliy Krokhmalyuk | Soviet Union | 14:00.27 | |
