= Dawn Run Mares Novice Chase =

Dawn Run Mares Novice Chase
2025
The Big Westerner	Jade De Grugy	Uhavemeinstitches

Previous years
2024
Bioluminescence	Paggane	Shecouldbeanything
2023
Hauturiere	Sainte Dona	Harmonya Maker
2022
Allegorie De Vassy	Malina Girl	Carrigeen Lotus
2021
Scarlet And Dove	Minx Tiara	Lunch In Adare

2020-2011
2020
Salsaretta	Ask Mary	Moskovite
2019
Moyhenna	Oh Me Oh My	Redhotfillypeppers
2018
Youcantcallherthat	Dinaria Des Obeaux	West Bridge
2017
Daisy's Gift	Slowmotion	Goulane Davina
2016
Bonny Kate	Uranna	Emcon
2015
Vroum Vroum Mag	Shesaportrait	Perfect Promise
2014
Caoimhe's Delight	Civena	Backinthere
2013
Charlie's Vic	Avondhu Lady	Dangan Daylight
2012
Knockfierna	Special Token	Ask Me Sister
2011
Aura About You	For Bill	Gentle Alice

2010-2002
2010
Inistioge	Cara Mara	Hello Kitty
2009
Moskova	Leanne	Go Sandy Go
2008
Candy Girl	Callherwhatulike	Its A Ladys Deal
2007
Laetitia	Sabina Park	Sea Diva
2006
American Jennie	Sunami Storm	Countess Trifaldi
2005
Shivermetimber	Nolans Pride	Tobeornotobe
2004
Baily Mist	Sheer Frustration	Stashedaway
2003
Princess Symphony	Be My Belle	Ammieanne
2002
Orthez	Discerning Air	Garden Town

The Dawn Run Mares Novice Chase, currently known for sponsorship purposes as the Charleville Cheese Irish EBF Mares Novice Chase, is a Grade 2 National Hunt novice chase in Ireland which is open to mares aged four years or older. It is run at Limerick over a distance of 2 miles and 6 furlongs (4,425 metres). The race is scheduled to take place each year in March.

The race was first run in 2002, and was awarded Grade 3 status in 2003. It was raised to Grade 2 status from the 2014 running.

== Records ==
Leading jockey (2 wins):

- Barry Geraghty – Shivermetimber (2005), Knockfierna (2012)
- Davy Russell - American Jennie (2006), Moskova (2009)
- Ruby Walsh - Candy Girl (2008), Vroum Vroum Mag (2015)
- Paul Townend - Daisy's Gift (2017), Salsaretta (2020)
- Denis Hogan - Youcantcallherthat (2018), Moyhenna (2019)
- Sean O'Keeffe - Concertista (2021), Allegorie De Vassy (2022)

Leading trainer (7 wins):

- Willie Mullins - Candy Girl (2008), Vroum Vroum Mag (2015), Daisy's Gift (2017), Salsaretta (2020), Concertista (2021), Allegorie De Vassy (2022), Hauturiere (2023)

== Winners ==
Year	Winner	Age	Jockey	Trainer
2002	Orthez	8	S G McDermott	Eoin Griffin
2003	Princess Symphony	7	J L Cullen	E Sheehy
2004	Baily Mist	7	David Casey	Mouse Morris
2005	Shivermetimber	7	Barry Geraghty	Francis Flood
2006	American Jennie	8	Davy Russell	Michael Cullen
2007	Laetitia	7	Andrew McNamara	Charles Byrnes
2008	Candy Girl	9	Ruby Walsh	Willie Mullins
2009	Moskova	6	Davy Russell	Paul Nolan
2010	Inistioge	7	Andrew Leigh	Garvan Donnelly
2011	Aura About You	8	Michael Doran (Note: amateur jockey)	Paul Nolan
2012	Knockfierna	7	Barry Geraghty	Charles Byrnes
2013	Charlie's Vic	6	Derek Fox	Noel C Kelly
2014	Caoimhe's Delight	8	Davy Condon	Sean O'Brien
2015	Vroum Vroum Mag	6	Ruby Walsh	Willie Mullins
2016	Bonny Kate	6	Sean Flanagan	Noel Meade
2017	Daisy's Gift	10	Paul Townend	Willie Mullins
2018	Youcantcallherthat	7	Denis Hogan	Denis Hogan
2019	Moyhenna	7	Denis Hogan	Denis Hogan
2020	Salsaretta	7	Paul Townend	Willie Mullins
2021	Scarlet And Dove	7	Donagh Meyler	Joseph O'Brien
2021	Concertista	7	Sean O'Keeffe	Willie Mullins
2022	Allegorie De Vassy	5	Sean O'Keeffe	Willie Mullins
2023	Hauturiere	6	Adrian Heskin	Willie Mullins
2024	Bioluminescence	6	Derek O'Connor (Note: amateur jockey)	Gavin Cromwell
2025	The Big Westerner	6	Mike O'Connor	Henry De Bromhead

== See also ==
- Horse racing in Ireland
- List of Irish National Hunt races
