= Limerick E.B.F. Mares Novice Hurdle =

Hurdle horse race in Ireland

E.B.F. Mares Novice Hurdle
2026
Zanoosh	How's Hannah	Carry On Heidi

Previous years
2025
Familiar Dreams	Grainne A Chroi	Barnahash Primrose
2024
Bioluminescence	Millstream Lady	Sarah Beara
2023
Eabha Grace	Hauturiere	Knockanard Lady
2022
Kilbarry Chloe	Mi Lighthouse	Ailie Rose
2021
Darrens Hope	Ballyshannon Rose	Sayce Gold

2020-2011
2020
Well Set Up	Lady Breffni	Darrens Hope
2019
Robin De Carlow	Well Set Up	Agusta Gold
2018
Lackaneen Leader	Moyhenna	Court Artist
2017
Kate Appleby Shoes	The Green Lady	Miss Mardan
2016
Barnahash Rose	Myztique	Court Challenge
2015
Keppols Queen	Lyrical Theatre	Dalmatia
2014
Katie T	Urticaire	Que Pasa
2013
Missunited	Twigline	Bobbina
2012
Noras Fancy	Madam Bovary	Shadow Eile
2011
Golden Sunbird	Definite Class	Dare To Doubt

2010-2004
2010
Morning Supreme	Blazing Tempo	For Bill
2009
Oligarch Society	Earth Mother	Itsallaracket
2008
Give It Time	Forgivememaria	Nirphania
2007
Chomba Womba	Candy Girl	Bronx Girl
2006
Celestial Wave	Josephine Cullen	Mise En Place
2005
Blazing Liss	Ocras Mor	Gaza Strip
2004
Criaire Princess	Greenhall Rambler	Waterlily

The Limerick E.B.F. Mares Novice Hurdle is a Grade 3 National Hunt novice hurdle race in Ireland which is open to mares aged four years or older. It is run at Limerick over a distance of 2 miles (3,218 metres), and it is scheduled to take place each year in March.

The race was first run in 2004 and was awarded Grade 3 status in 2013.

== Records ==
Most successful jockey (3 wins):

- Davy Russell - Blazing Liss (2005), Oligarch Society (2009), Lackaneen Leader (2018)

Most successful trainer (4 wins):

- Willie Mullins– Morning Supreme (2010), Kate Appleby Shoes (2017), Robin De Carlow (2019), Eabha Grace (2023)

== Winners ==
Year	Winner	Age	Jockey	Trainer
2004	Criaire Princess	6	J F Levins	E Cleary
2005	Blazing Liss	6	Davy Russell	John E Kiely
2006	Celestial Wave	6	Nina Carberry	Adrian Maguire
2007	Chomba Womba	6	T P Treacy	James Casey
2008	Give It Time	5	A D Leigh	Jessica Harrington
2009	Oligarch Society	6	Davy Russell	Michael O'Brien
2010	Morning Supreme	7	Ruby Walsh	Willie Mullins
2011	Golden Sunbird	7	M N Doran	Paul Nolan
2012	Noras Fancy	6	P F Mangan	James Joseph Mangan
2013	Missunited	6	Barry Geraghty	Michael Winters
2014	Katie T	5	Adrian Heskin	Kevin Prendergast
2015	Keppols Queen	7	Robbie Power	Jessica Harrington
2016	Barnahash Rose	8	A McCurtin	Jonathan Sweeney
2017	Kate Appleby Shoes	8	Paul Townend	Willie Mullins
2018	Lackaneen Leader	6	Davy Russell	Gordon Elliott
2019	Robin De Carlow	6	Ruby Walsh	Willie Mullins
2020	Well Set Up	7	Ricky Doyle	Mark Fahey
2021	Darrens Hope	7	Kevin Brouder	Robert Murphy
2022	Kilbarry Chloe	5	Mike O'Connor	Con O'Keeffe
2023	Eabha Grace	6	Conor McNamara	Willie Mullins
2025	Familiar Dreams	6	Jordan Gainford	Gordon Elliott
2026	Zanoosh	6	Brian Hayes	Colm Murphy

== See also ==
- List of Irish National Hunt races
