= Team Volcano =

Team Volcano, also known as Team Volcano International or TVI, was a multi-sport team prominent in the mid to late 1990s.

== History ==
The team, founded by Chris Eversfield and Iain Parsons in 1995, was the first non-geographic triathlon team (other than those from the British military and emergency services) to be fully affiliated to the sport's governing body, the British Triathlon Association. The team pioneered the use of digital communication and the emerging internet to communicate with its network of athletes.

The team was founded in Lanzarote and named after the Volcano Triathlon.

Team Volcano attracted many international athletes during its most active years, including many guest-event athletes.

== Athletes ==
Notable athletes who have raced for or represented Team Volcano during its time include:

- Julian Goater (World Champion Triathlete, Commonwealth Medalist and Top 10 GB 10k)
- Anthony Stirrat (Team GB, Barcelona 92)

Many athletes were long-course or Ironman-focused, although the team had success in Spring and middle-distance events.

== Disbandenment ==
Team Volcano ceased to exist formally in 2001, although certain members of the team continued racing unofficially under the TVI banner for a number of seasons afterwards.
