= Jiří Sýkora (runner) =

Czechoslovak long-distance runner

Personal information
- Nationality: Czechoslovak
- Born: 1 July 1954 (age 72)

Sport
- Sport: Long-distance running
- Event: 5000 metres

Jiří Sýkora (born 1 July 1954) is a former Czechoslovak long-distance runner. He competed in the men's 5000 metres at the 1980 Summer Olympics.
