= Paul Maloney =

Paul Maloney may refer to:

- Paul Lewis Maloney (born 1949), United States federal judge
- Paul H. Maloney (1876–1967), U.S. Representative from Louisiana
- Paul Maloney (footballer) (born 1952), English professional footballer

== See also ==
- Paul Moloney (disambiguation)
