= Ellison Goodall =

American long-distance runner

Medal record

Women's athletics

Representing the United States

IAAF World Cross Country Championships
Bronze medal – third place	1979 Limerick	Senior race

Ellison Goodall Bishop (born October 12, 1954) is an American former long-distance runner. She twice represented the United States at the IAAF World Cross Country Championships, winning a bronze medal and leading the American women to team gold at the 1979 edition, then sharing in a team bronze medal in 1980.

She attended Duke University and won All-American honours for the Duke Blue Devils in both track and cross country. She was the second woman to be inducted into Duke University athletic hall of fame. She later appeared in a documentary on former Duke track coach Al Buehler, Starting at the Finish Line: The Coach Buehler Story.

Goodall was only the second ever women's champion in the 10,000-meter run at the USA Outdoor Track and Field Championships, succeeding Peg Neppel to take the title in 1978.

Her half marathon winning time of 1:15:01 at a race in Winston-Salem, North Carolina was a world record for several months, taking the best mark from Miki Gorman before Kathy Mintie broke the record that same year. On the professional road running circuit she was the 1979 winner of the Falmouth Road Race, won the 1982 Boston Milk Run, and placed sixth at the 1980 Boston Marathon with a time of 2:42:23 hours.

== International competitions ==
Year	Competition	Venue	Position	Event	Notes
1979	World Cross Country Championships	Limerick, Ireland	3rd	Senior race	17:18
1979	World Cross Country Championships	Limerick, Ireland	1st	Senior team	29 pts
1980	World Cross Country Championships	Paris, France	35th	Senior race	16:42
1980	World Cross Country Championships	Paris, France	3rd	Senior team	49 pts

== National titles ==
- USA Outdoor Track and Field Championships
  - 10,000-meter run: 1978

Records
Preceded by (United States) Miki Gorman	Women's Half marathon World record holder 10 March 1979 – 23 September 1979	Succeeded by (United States) Patti Catalano
