= Ethiopia at the 1983 World Championships in Athletics =

- Flag of Ethiopia
- WA code: ETH
- National federation: Ethiopian Athletics Federation

in Helsinki, Finland August 7–14, 1983
- Competitors: 10 (10 men) in 5 events
- Medals Ranked =15th: Gold 0 Silver 1 Bronze 0 Total 1

World Championships in Athletics appearances
- 1983; 1987; 1991; 1993; 1995; 1997; 1999; 2001; 2003; 2005; 2007; 2009; 2011; 2013; 2015; 2017; 2019; 2022; 2023

Ethiopia competed at the 1983 World Championships in Athletics in Helsinki, Finland, from August 7 to 14, 1983.

== Medalists ==
The following competitors from Ethiopia won medals at the Championships

Medal	Athlete	Event
Silver	Kebede Balcha	Men's marathon

== Results ==
=== Men ===
Track and road events

Athlete	Event	Heat		Semifinal		Final	
Athlete	Event	Result	Rank	Result	Rank	Result	Rank
Wodajo Bulti	5000 metres	13:43.53	2 Q	13:33.03	8 Q	13:34.03	7
Seyoum Nigatu	5000 metres	14:13.22	12 Q	14:02.23	25	Did not advance	
Mohamed Kedir	5000 metres	DNS		Did not advance			
Mohamed Kedir	10,000 metres	28:07.16	14 Q	—		28:09.92	9
Bekele Debele	10,000 metres	27:49.30	7 q	—		28:11.13	10
Girma Berhanu	10,000 metres	DNS		—		Did not advance	
Eshetu Tura	3000 metres steeplechase	8:53.86	32	Did not advance			
Girma Woldehana	3000 metres steeplechase	9:31.81	35	Did not advance			
Kebede Balcha	Marathon	—				2:10:27	2nd place, silver medalist(s)
Dereje Nedi	Marathon	—				Did not finish	
Kebede Balcha	20 km walk	—				1:30:36	38
