= Panetti =

Panetti is an Italian surname. Notable people with the surname include:

- Domenico Panetti (1460–1530), Italian Renaissance painter
- Ennio Panetti (born 1954), Italian male former long-distance runner
- Luciano Panetti (1929–2016), Italian footballer

== See also ==
- Panetti v. Quarterman, a United States Supreme Court case
