= Jim Hill (runner) =

Personal information
- Born: July 1, 1961 (age 64) Vienna, Virginia, U.S.

Sport
- Country: United States
- Sport: Athletics
- College team: University of Oregon
Medal record
Representing United States

Jim Hill (born July 1, 1961) is an American former distance runner who competed over distances from the 1500 metres to the 10,000 metres. He represented the United States at the 1983 World Championships in Athletics in the 5000 metres, where he finished 16th overall, and at the 1979 IAAF World Cross Country Championships in the junior men's race where he finished 12th individually and helped his team to a 4th-place finish. He was also a five-time NCAA Division 1 All American and four-time Pac 10 Champion in cross country and track and field while at the University of Oregon.

== Early life and education ==
Hill was born on July 1, 1961, in Vienna, Virginia, and attended Oakton High School, where he competed in Track and field and Cross Country, winning five state titles. He graduated from the University of Oregon with a degree in finance.

== Career ==
He then founded a company focused on designing clothing that is comfortable for running, cross country skiing, cycling, and hiking in different types of weather.

== International competitions ==
Year	Competition	Venue	Position	Event	Notes
1979	World Cross County Championships	Limerick, Ireland	12th	Junior race	23:37
1979	World Cross County Championships	Limerick, Ireland	4th	Team	106 pts
1983	World Championships in Athletics	Helsinki, Finland	8th	5000 m	14:58.21 (Heat 2)
1983	World Championships in Athletics	Helsinki, Finland	8th (16th overall)	5000 m	13:38.56 (Semi-final 2)

== SportHill ==
Hill is the founder of SportHill, an athletic wear company. The company was founded in 1985 after he graduated from university where his goal was to develop better running gear using high quality fabrics that last.

== Personal bests ==
- 1500 metres – 3:39.85 (1982)
- Mile – 3:56.41 (1982)
- 3000 metres – 7.48.82 (1984)
- 5000 metres – 13:19.73 (1983)
- 10,000 metres – 27:55.23 (1983)
