= Fergus O'Toole Memorial Novice Hurdle =

Hurdle horse race in Ireland

Fergus O'Toole Memorial Novice Hurdle
2026
Tountinna	Dallas Star	Emerald Enigma

Previous years
2025
Shadow Paddy	Ballykinlar	Carrigg Island
2024
World Of Fortunes	Just For Love	A Tipp For Gold
2023
High Class Hero	The Big Doyen	The Wallpark
2022
Plains Indian	The Friday Man	Another Choice
2021
Off Your Rocco	The Little Yank	The Dara Man

2020-2011
2020
Formal Order	Fairyhill Run	The Little Yank
2019
Darver Star	Fast Buck	Blazing Emily
2018
Percy Veer	Calie Du Mesnil	Madison To Monroe
2017
Robin Des Foret	Fabulous Saga	Burren Life
2016
Peregrine Run	Screaming Rose	Electric Concorde
2015
Long Dog	Solatentif	Little Mitch
2014
Hash Brown	Sang Tiger	Draycott Place
2013
Indevan	Lots Of Memories	Little King Robin
2012
Zuzka	Dara Tango	Busty Brown
2011
Royal Reveille	Resolute Bay	Rheinland

2010-2001
2010
Macville	Drumfire	Bideford Legend
2009
Warne	Premier Victory	St Devote
2008
Alpha Ridge	Conclave	Garrai Ard
2007
Major Finnegan	Shuil Aris	Native Royal
2006
Amalfitano	Davenport Democrat	Maxi
2005
Mossbank	Powerstation	Liscooney
2004
Laurel View	Carapuncha	Megan's Bob
2003
Lowlander	Ballysheedy	Caherado
2002
Colonel Monroe	Moss Bawn	Arboreta
2001
Golden Row	Mona Day	Wotsitooya
2002
Colonel Monroe	Rose Perk	Larry Hogan
2001
Golden Row	Mona Day	Wotsitooya

The Fergus O'Toole Memorial Novice Hurdle is a Listed National Hunt novice hurdle race in Ireland which is open to horses aged four years or older. It is run at Limerick over a distance of about 2 miles and 5 furlongs (4,224 metres), and it is scheduled to take place each year in October.

The race was first run in 2001 and was awarded Grade 3 status in 2011. It was downgraded to Listed status from 2016. The race was sponsored by Newenham Mulligan Architects from 2001 to 2009. It was later named in memory of a local businessman, Fergus O'Toole, who died in 2010. In 2017 and 2018 the race was run as the Dunraven Arms Hotel Novice Hurdle and it was 2019 it was named the Ladbrokes Where The Nation Plays Novice Hurdle. Since 2020 it has been run as the Bluegrass Horse Feed Novice Hurdle.

== Records ==
Most successful jockey (4 wins):

- Ruby Walsh - Royal Reveille (2011), Zuzka (2012), Indevan (2013), Long Dog (2015)

Most successful trainer (5 wins):

- Willie Mullins– Zuzka (2012), Indevan (2013), Long Dog (2015), Robin Des Foret (2017), High Class Hero (2023)

== Winners ==
Year	Winner	Age	Jockey	Trainer
2001	Golden Row	7	P P O'Brien	Charles Byrnes
2002	Colonel Monroe	5	Norman Williamson	Edward O'Grady
2003	Lowlander	4	Paul Carberry	Dermot Weld
2004	Laurel View	6	Paul Carberry	Noel Meade
2005	Mossbank	5	Denis O'Regan	Michael Hourigan
2006	Amalfitano	6	Barry Geraghty	A K Wyse
2007	Major Finnegan	5	Davy Russell	W J Burke
2008	Alpha Ridge	6	Alain Cawley	Paul Nolan
2009	Warne	5	Andrew McNamara	Edward O'Grady
2010	Macville	6	Paul Townend	Patrick Neville
2011	Royal Reveille	6	Ruby Walsh	Ted Walsh
2012	Zuzka	5	Ruby Walsh	Willie Mullins
2013	Indevan	5	Ruby Walsh	Willie Mullins
2014	Hash Brown	5	Barry Geraghty	Michael Hourigan
2015	Long Dog	5	Ruby Walsh	Willie Mullins
2016	Peregrine Run	6	Roger Loughran	Peter Fahey
2017	Robin Des Foret	7	Paul Townend	Willie Mullins
2018	Percy Veer	6	Davy Russell	Eric McNamara
2019	Darver Star	7	Jonathan Moore	Gavin Cromwell
2020	Formal Order	4	Sean Flanagan	Matthew Smith
2021	Off Your Rocco	5	Jack Kennedy	Gordon Elliott
2022	Plains Indian	6	Danny Mullins	Andrew Slattery
2023	High Class Hero	6	Paul Townend	Willie Mullins
2024	World Of Fortunes	6	Jordan Gainford	Liam Kenny
2025	Shadow Paddy	5	Simon Torrens	Eoin McCarthy
2026	Tountinna	5	Darragh O'Keeffe	Maike Magnussen

== See also ==
- Horse racing in Ireland
- List of Irish National Hunt races
