= Robert Chideka =

Botswana athlete

Personal information
- Nationality: Botswana
- Born: 1 May 1956 (age 70)

Sport
- Sport: Long-distance running
- Event: 5000 metres

Robert Chideka (born 1 May 1956) is a Botswana long-distance runner. He competed in the men's 5000 metres at the 1980 Summer Olympics.
