= Steve Binns =

British long-distance runner

Personal information
- Nationality: British (English)
- Born: 25 August 1960 (age 65) Keighley, West Yorkshire
- Height: 170 cm (5 ft 7 in)
- Weight: 57 kg (126 lb)

Sport
- Sport: Athletics
- Event: long-distance
- Club: Bingley Harriers
Medal record
Athletics
Representing England
Commonwealth Games
Silver medal – second place	1986 Edinburgh	10,000m

Stephen John Binns (born 25 August 1960) is a British former long-distance runner who competed at the 1988 Summer Olympics.

== Biography ==
Binns rose to prominence in 1979 as a junior athlete. First he took the individual and team silver medals at the 1979 IAAF World Cross Country Championships junior race, then won the 5000 metres at the 1979 European Athletics Junior Championships – his winning time of 13:44.37 minutes remains the championship record as of 2014. He capped the season with a European junior record of 13:27.04 minutes in London.

As a senior athlete he competed five times at the IAAF World Cross Country Championships (1981 to 1988) and competed twice for Great Britain at the World Championships in Athletics (1983 and 1987).

Representing England he was the silver medallist in the 10,000 metres at the 1986 Commonwealth Games in Edinburgh, Scotland, behind compatriot Jon Solly.

Binns was on the podium of the AAA Championships four times in the 5,000 or 10,000 metres before finally becoming the British 10,000 metres champion after winning the British AAA Championships title at the 1988 AAA Championships.
