= Otello Sorato =

Italian long-distance runner

Personal information
- Nationality: Italian
- Born: 22 May 1954 (age 72)

Sport
- Country: Italy
- Sport: Athletics
- Event: Long-distance running

Achievements and titles
- Personal best: 10,000 m: 28:53.43 (1980)

Otello Sorato (born 22 May 1954) is a former Italian male long-distance runner who competed at one edition of the IAAF World Cross Country Championships at senior level (1980).
