= Jeff Nelson (runner) =

American former long-distance runner

Jeff Nelson (born 28 March 1961) is an American former long distance runner. He was a high school phenom at Burbank High School (Burbank, California), where he set the national high school record in the 2 mile run, the predecessor to today's 3200 meter run, at 8:36.3. He set the record before a national television audience, running in open competition at the Pepsi Invitational, May 6, 1979 at the University of California, Los Angeles.

The record would stand until June 20, 2008, when it was surpassed by German Fernandez from Riverbank High School, who ran an 8:34.40 at the Nike Outdoor Nationals. Fernandez had run an 8:34.23 for 3200 meters three weeks earlier at the CIF California State Meet, which was a faster time for the slightly shorter distance. The CIF mark is the current NFHS national record at the official distance. Nelson's mark was set before the event became the 3200 meters. Converted, Fernandez' mark was equivalent to about an 8:37.5 2 mile (slightly slower than Nelson).

Nelson was also on the United States team at the 1979 IAAF World Cross Country Championships, finishing 4th overall in the junior men's division, handily besting future star Steve Cram in the process.

As a precursor to the record, he ran an indoor 2 mile at the Sunkist Invitational in 8:55.1. A few weeks later, in an open race in the Jack in the Box Indoor Invitational in San Diego he ran an outstanding 8:42.7, which was narrowly behind Gerry Lindgren's all-time high school best, set indoors in 1964. He won the CIF California State Meet twice in 1978 and 1979. He went undefeated his senior cross country season, 14 for 14 while setting 14 course records in the process, including the famed Mt. SAC course. Prior to the cross country season, Nelson was reportedly running 100 miles a week, peaking at 142, inspired by (among others) the success of local runner Mark Covert winning the Division II NCAA Men's Cross Country Championship.

After his success in high school, Nelson went to the University of Oregon on full scholarship, joining top runners Alberto Salazar, Rudy Chapa, Art Boileau and Jim Hill. There he sustained an injury, which eventually drove him from the university. The following year he showed up healthy at Glendale Community College (California), where his individual victory led his team to the State Community College Championships in Cross Country. The women's team also won in 1980, the first time a school had won both championships in the same season. But Nelson was injured again, twice. By 1982, he decided not to continue running.

The entire 1980 championship team, men and women, including Nelson was inducted into the Glendale College Athletic Hall of Fame in 2006. As an individual, Nelson was inducted in 2009.
