= Alain Bordeleau =

Canadian long-distance runner

Personal information
- Born: 7 October 1956 (age 70) Lachine, Quebec, Canada
- Height: 177 cm (5 ft 10 in)
- Weight: 63 kg (139 lb)

Sport
- Sport: Long-distance running
- Event: Marathon

Alain Bordeleau (born 7 October 1956) is a Canadian long-distance runner. He competed in the marathon at the 1984 Summer Olympics in Los Angeles and finished 65th.
