= Silvano Babici =

Italian long-distance runner

Personal information
- Nationality: Italian
- Born: 5 December 1952 (age 72) Viareggio

Sport
- Country: Italy
- Sport: Athletics
- Event: Long-distance running

Silvano Babici (born 5 December 1952) is a former Italian male long-distance runner who competed at one edition of the IAAF World Cross Country Championships at senior level (1980).

== Biography ==
His son Alessandro, who was a duathlon junior Italian national, died while he was training at the age of 23.
