= Danny McDaid =

Irish Olympic athlete (b.1941)

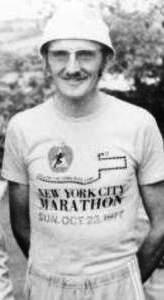

Medal record

Men's athletics

Representing Ireland

World Cross Country Championships
Silver medal – second place	1979 Limerick	Long Race

Daniel McDaid (Irish: Dónall Mac Daibhéad; born 4 August 1941) is a two-time Irish Olympic athlete and four-time national marathon champion from Letterkenny, County Donegal, Ireland. He is a former member of the Dublin-based athletic club Clonliffe Harriers.

He competed for Ireland at two Olympic Games, Munich 1972 and Montreal 1976. He was the first Irishman to cross the finish line at the 1972 games. He took part in nine World Championships, first competing for Ireland in the International Cross Country Championships in Madrid in 1969. He finished 11th in Limerick in 1979 when John Treacy lifted the world title for Ireland. He was captain of the Irish Senior Cross Country team from 1975 to 1981.

The running track at the Letterkenny Regional Sports and Leisure Complex is named in his honour. The Danny McDaid 15k, which begins and concludes at this track, is also named after him.

He once served as a postman in the Letterkenny area. He is currently a member of Letterkenny Athletic Club.

He has three daughters. Orla, Niamh, Ciara and a son Daragh.

== Achievements in Major Finals ==
Year	Tournament	Venue	Result	Event	Time	Notes
1972	1972 Summer Olympics	Munich, Germany	23	Men's Marathon	2:22:25	Olympic debut
1976	1976 IAAF World Cross Country Championships	Chepstow, Wales	53	Long Race	36:27	
1976	1976 Summer Olympics	Montreal, Quebec, Canada	42	Men's Marathon	2:27:07	
1978	1978 IAAF World Cross Country Championships	Glasgow, Scotland	31	Long Race	40:52	
1979	1979 IAAF World Cross Country Championships	Limerick, Ireland	11	Long Race	38:02	
1980	1980 IAAF World Cross Country Championships	Paris, France	93	Long Race	39:13	
1981	1981 IAAF World Cross Country Championships	Madrid, Spain	188	Long Race	38:37	
1984	Cork City Marathon	Cork, Ireland	21	Marathon	2:31:29	
