= François Person =

French cyclist

Personal information
- Born: 23 May 1922 La Bouëxière, France
- Died: 24 March 1980 (aged 57) Guichen, France

Cycling career
- Sport: Cycling
- Role: Rider

François Person (23 May 1922 – 24 March 1980) was a French racing cyclist. He rode in the 1948 and 1949 Tour de France.
