= Elena Rastello =

Italian middle-distance runner

Personal information
- National team: Italy (4 caps 1977-1979)
- Born: 13 December 1958 (age 67) Turin, Italy

Sport
- Country: Italy
- Sport: Athletics
- Events: Middle-distance running; Cross country running

Achievements and titles
- Personal best: 1500: 4:22.8 (1977)

Elena Rastello (born 13 December 1958) is a former Italian female middle-distance runner and cross-country runner who competed at individual senior level at the World Athletics Cross Country Championships (1979).
