= Limerick Racecourse =

Racecourse in County Limerick, Ireland

Coordinates: 52.59°N 8.69°W

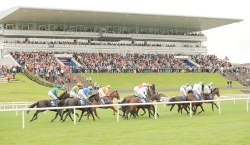
Limerick Racecourse

Limerick Racecourse (Greenmount Park) is a horse racing venue in County Limerick, Ireland, which stages both National Hunt and flat racing. The course opened in October 2001 and is the first purpose-built racecourse in Ireland in 50 years. The present location is the seventh different horse racing location in Limerick since 1790. In 1999, the course at Greenpark near Limerick city closed after 130 years of racing.

The course is a right-handed oval track of about 11 furlongs (7,260 ft; 2,210 m). It is located on the M20 at exit 4, 6 kilometres (3.7 mi) outside the city.

== Notable races ==
Month	DOW	Race Name	Type	Grade	Distance	Age/Sex
March	Sunday	Dawn Run Mares Novice Chase	Chase	Grade 2	2m 6f	5yo + m
March	Sunday	Limerick E.B.F. Mares Novice Hurdle	Hurdle	Grade 3	2m	4yo + m
October	Sunday	Fergus O'Toole Memorial Novice Hurdle	Hurdle	Grade 3	2m 5f	4yo +
December	St Stephen's Day	Faugheen Novice Chase	Chase	Grade 1	2m 3f 120y	4yo +
December	29th	Dorans Pride Novice Hurdle	Hurdle	Grade 2	3m	4yo +
