= Sabine Ladurner =

Italian long-distance runner

Personal information
- National team: Italy (3 caps 1979-1982)
- Born: 16 October 1960 (age 65) Merano, Italy

Sport
- Country: Italy
- Sport: Athletics
- Events: Middle-distance running; Long-distance running; Cross country running

Achievements and titles
- Personal bests: Half marathon: 1:28:56 (1982); Marathon: 2:48:06 (1984)

Sabine Ladurner (born 16 October 1960) is a former Italian female middle-distance runner and cross-country runner who competed at individual senior level at the World Athletics Cross Country Championships (1979, 80).
