= Julian Goater =

British long-distance runner

Personal information
- Nationality: British (English)
- Born: 12 January 1953 (age 73) Southampton, England

Sport
- Sport: Athletics
- Event: long-distance
- Club: Shaftesbury Barnet Harriers
Medal record
Men's Athletics
Representing England
IAAF World Cross Country Championships
Gold medal – first place	1979 Limerick	Team
Silver medal – second place	1982 Rome	Team
Commonwealth Games
Bronze medal – third place	1982 Brisbane	10,000m
Summer Universiade
Bronze medal – third place	1975 Rome	10,000m

Julian Norris Goater (born 12 January 1953) is a male British former long-distance runner.

== Biography ==
Goater was born in Southampton, England but grew up in Mill Hill, London, and began his running career while attending The Haberdashers' Aske's Boys' School, Elstree, where his father Barry (1930-2022) was a Biology master. In 1979 he was a member of the team that took the gold medal at IAAF World Cross Country Championships. He was also in the team that won the silver medal in World Cross Country Championships in 1982. In 1981 he was the National Cross Country champion and finished 4th in IAAF WCCC. He set the second fastest 5000m time for a Briton (behind Brendan Foster) when he ran a time of 13:15.59 in 1981 at Crystal Palace, London. His best time for the 10,000 m is 27:34.58 which was achieved in Oslo in 1982 and is still in the UK top 10 of best ever times.

Goater became the British 10,000 metres champion after winning the British AAA Championships title at the 1982 AAA Championships.

He represented England and won a bronze medal in the 10,000 metres event, at the 1982 Commonwealth Games in Brisbane, Australia.

Goater took up triathlon and duathlon in the 1990s competing at National and International Age-Group levels. During the late 1990s he joined Team Volcano International, run by Chris Eversfield and Iain Parsons, competing for the TVI Team Volcano team over a number of seasons. Goater achieved a gold medal at the World Duathon Championships (2001) in Rimini, picking up another gold in Australia in 2005. He remains an active coach, athlete and author. He is now living in Surrey and visits schools around Bracknell to give talks to children.
