= Johan Geirnaert =

Belgian long-distance runner

Personal information
- Nationality: Belgian
- Born: 9 January 1951 (age 75)

Sport
- Sport: Long-distance running
- Event: Marathon

Johan Geirnaert (born 9 January 1951) is a Belgian long-distance runner. He competed in the marathon at the 1984 Summer Olympics.
