= Greenpark Racecourse =

Racecourse in Limerick, Ireland

Coordinates: 53.299414°N 8.999240°W

Greenpark Racecourse was a horse racing venue in Limerick, Ireland.

In 1963 the venue was used by Limerick mayor Frances Condell to host a reception for U.S. President John Fitzgerald Kennedy on his visit to Ireland. At the venue in 1979, Irish runner John Treacy won gold at the IAAF World Cross Country Championships and a stage of Pope John Paul II's visit to Ireland was held here.

Due to flooding problems, increasing traffic congestion and a limited fixture list it was decided in the mid-1990s to find a new venue for horse racing in Limerick. A suitable location was identified at Greenmount near Patrickswell and the land was purchased in 1996. The course at Greenpark closed in 1999 after 130 years of racing. The last race meeting at the venue took place on Sunday 21 March 1999. The final ever horse race run at the Greenpark Racecourse was the Finucane Electrical I.N.H. Flat Race (a bumper) over two miles. It was won by the Arthur Moore trained 'Well Ridden' on his racecourse debut. This horse was owned by well known judge Frank Clarke and went on to win five further races in his career including the prestigious Arkle Perpetual Challenge Cup at Leopardstown.

11 acres of the racecourse site were sold to the Irish Greyhound Board (IGB) in 2008 to build the new Limerick Greyhound Stadium which opened in October 2010. There have been numerous attempts to develop the site for residential purposes but none have been realised In June 2017 a plan for 26 houses was rejected by An Bord Pleanála. In 2019 the 116.5-acre site was sold to a group of local businessmen for €8m. As of June 2021 development of the site is still at the planning stage with a large housing development under consideration. In April 2022 a property development company received permission to build 371 housing units on the site.
