= Eddie Leddy =

Irish long-distance runner

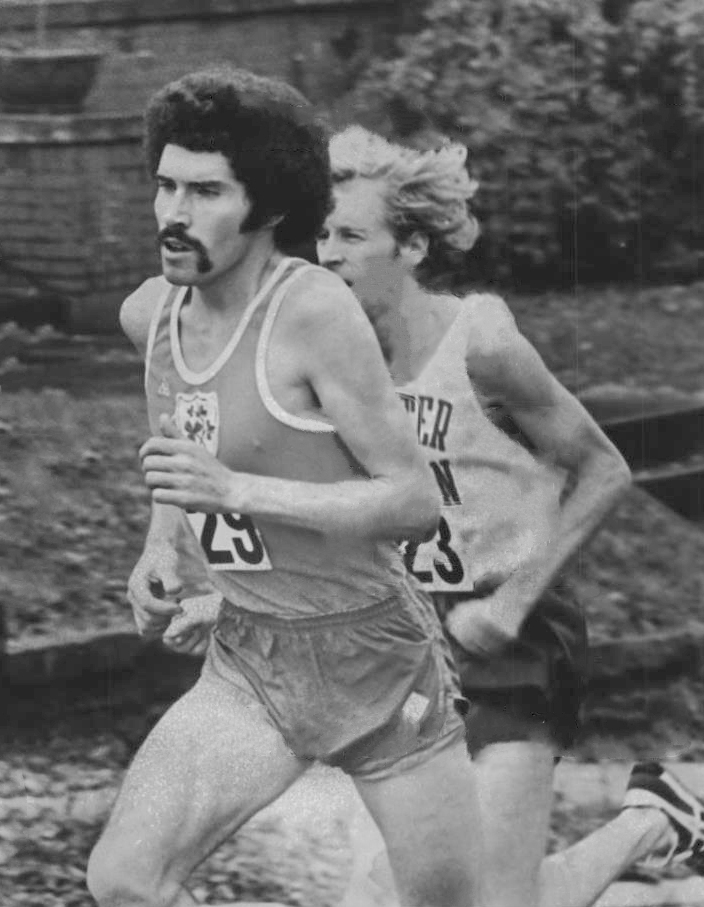
- Leddy (left) in 1976

Personal information
- Born: 8 September 1951 (age 74)
- Height: 184 cm (6 ft 0 in)
- Weight: 66 kg (146 lb)

Sport
- Sport: Athletics
- Events: 5000 m, 10000 m, steeplechase
- Club: St. Finbarr's AC, Cork

Achievements and titles
- Personal bests: 5000 m – 13:40.54 (1976); 10000 – 28:32.8 (1976); 3000 mS – 8:35.2 (1974)

Edward "Eddie" Leddy (born 8 September 1951) is a retired Irish long-distance runner. He competed in the 3000 m steeplechase at the 1972 Olympics and in the 5000 m and 10,000 m at the 1976 Olympics, but failed to reach the finals.

Leddy competed for the East Tennessee State Buccaneers track and field team in the NCAA.

He won the 10,000 m event at the 1976 USA Outdoor Track and Field Championships.
