= Donie Walsh =

Irish marathon runner and coach

Personal information
- Born: 27 March 1948 (age 78) County Cork, Ireland

Sport
- Sport: Cross-country running Marathon running

Donal "Donie" Walsh (born 27 March 1948) is a retired Irish Marathon runner and coach.

== Track career ==
Walsh attended Villanova University. He also competed at the 1972 Olympics.

== Cross country career ==
He earned a team silver at the 1979 IAAF World Cross Country Championships and competed in the event nine times.

== Coaching career ==
He is the coach of Lizzie Lee. He has also advised Sonia O'Sullivan.
