= Franco Ambrosioni =

Italian long-distance runner (born 1951)

Personal information
- Full name: Francesco Ambrosioni
- Nationality: Italian
- Born: 17 August 1951 (age 74)

Sport
- Country: Italy
- Sport: Athletics
- Event: Long-distance running

Achievements and titles
- Personal best: Marathon: 2:16:13 (1983)

Franco Ambrosioni (born 17 August 1951) is a former Italian male long-distance runner who competed at one edition of the IAAF World Cross Country Championships at senior level (1980).
