= Nick Rose (runner) =

British athlete (born 1951)

Personal information
- Nationality: British (English)
- Born: 30 December 1951 (age 74) Bristol, England
- Height: 5 ft 9 in (1.75 m)

Sport
- Sport: Athletics
- Event(s): middle- and long-distance running
- Club: Bristol Athletics Club
Medal record
Men's athletics
Representing Great Britain
IAAF World Cross Country Championships
| Bronze medal – third place | 1980 Paris | 12 kilometres |
| Gold medal – first place | 1980 Paris | Team |
| Gold medal – first place | 1979 Limerick | Team |
Representing England
Commonwealth Games
| Silver medal – second place | 1982 Brisbane | 5000 metres |

Nicholas Henry Rose (born 30 December 1951) is a British former international track and field athlete. He competed in a variety of middle-distance and long-distance running events and participated in the 1980 Summer Olympics and the 1984 Summer Olympics. He set the world record in the half-marathon in 1979.

== Biography ==
He is the current European record holder in the 10K run (road), and British record holder in the 4×1 mile relay event. His personal best in the half-marathon is 1:01:03, the second fastest British time after Steve Jones. He also held the British record in the indoor 2 miles event with 8:18.4—a record which stood for 24 years exactly.

Rose's first major victory came in the NCAA Men's Cross Country Championship in 1974, competing for Western Kentucky University. In May 1975, Rose ran the first sub-four minute mile on Kentucky soil. He successfully made the progression to professional athletics, running the fastest indoor 3000 metres time of any athlete in 1978. He was the national champion in the 10,000 metres in 1980.

He ran in the IAAF World Cross Country Championships twice. He made his first appearance in 1979 where he finished 21st and was a member of the winning English team. He returned the following year and this time took the bronze in the individual event and led the English team to an overall victory.

Rose became the British 10,000 metres champion after winning the British AAA Championships title at the 1980 AAA Championships.

Rose competed at the 1980 Olympic Games in the 5000 metres event but failed to qualify for the final. He took the silver medal at the 1982 Commonwealth Games, coming second to Dave Moorcroft in the 5000 metres. Rose competed only once at the World Championships in Athletics, finishing in seventh in the 10,000 metres in 1983. He found success at the 1983 Gate River Run in Florida however, winning the 15 km race in 43:42.

Rose made his second Olympic appearance at the 1984 Olympic Games, this time competing in the 10,000 metres event, finishing twelfth in the final. He won the national championships in the 10000 metres race in 1984.

He continued to run into the masters division, winning the Boilermaker Road Race in 1993.

Records
| Preceded by Tony Simmons | Men's Half Marathon World Record Holder; 14 October 1979 – 7 December 1979 | Succeeded by Kirk Pfeffer |
