= Mick O'Shea =

Irish long-distance runner

Personal information
- Full name: Michael O'Shea
- Nationality: Irish
- Born: 16 September 1954 (age 71)

Sport
- Sport: Long-distance running
- Event: 5000 metres

Michael O'Shea (born 16 September 1954) is an Irish long-distance runner. He competed in the men's 5000 metres at the 1980 Summer Olympics.
