= Marco Marchei =

Italian long-distance runner

Personal information
- Nationality: Italian
- Born: 2 August 1954 (age 71) Ascoli Piceno, Italy
- Height: 1.78 m (5 ft 10 in)
- Weight: 60 kg (130 lb)

Sport
- Country: Italy
- Sport: Athletics
- Event: Marathon
- Club: Pro PAtria Milano

Achievements and titles
- Personal best: Marathon: 2:11.47 (1983)
Medal record
Mediterranean Games
Silver medal – second place	1979 Split	Marathon

Marco Marchei (born 2 August 1954 in Castignano, Ascoli Piceno) is a retired male long-distance runner from Italy.

== Biography ==
He twice competed for his native country at the Summer Olympics: in 1980 and 1984. Marchei set his personal best (2:11.47) in the men's marathon on 14 August 1983 at the World Championships. He is the father of Valentina Marchei.

== Achievements ==
- All results regarding marathon, unless stated otherwise

Year	Competition	Venue	Position	Notes
Representing Italy
1980	Olympic Games	Moscow, Soviet Union	35th	2:23:21
1982	Rome City Marathon	Rome, Italy	4th	2:12:38
1983	World Championships	Helsinki, Finland	13th	2:11:47
1984	Olympic Games	Los Angeles, United States	43rd	2:22:38
