= Ennio Panetti =

Italian long-distance runner

Personal information
- Nationality: Italian
- Born: 2 December 1954 (age 71)

Sport
- Country: Italy
- Sport: Athletics
- Event: Long-distance running

Achievements and titles
- Personal best: 10,000 m: 29:32.46 (1980)

Ennio Panetti (born 4 December 1954) is an Italian male former long-distance runner who competed at two editions of the IAAF World Cross Country Championships at senior level (1979, 1980).
