= Ray Treacy (track and field) =

Runner and coach

Ray Treacy (born November 25, 1954) is a former competitive distance runner and coach of collegiate and professional runners. He began coaching track and field and cross country at Providence College in the U.S. state of Rhode Island in 1984, and became the head coach in 1986.

== Education and early athletics competition ==
Treacy was born in County Waterford, Ireland and was an Irish national junior champion and a member of the Irish National Cross Country Team. He attended Providence College in Rhode Island, graduating in 1982. He represented Ireland in the World Cross Country Championships in 1977–79. His best road race times were in 1983, 47:42 for the Ballycotton IRL 10 mile, 2:16:54 while finishing second in the Cork IRL Marathon, and 10 km in 28:48 in Boston, Massachusetts, in 1985. As a collegiate runner, he took National Collegiate Athletic Association (NCAA) All-America honors on three occasions. He was the New England Cross Country Champion twice, won the Big East Indoor Championship at 5,000 meters three times. He was the IC4A Champion in the 1981 10,000 and 1982 5,000 meters.

He is the brother of John Treacy, a four-time Irish Olympian, who took second place in the Los Angeles Marathon in 1984, and twice (1977-1978) was the World Cross Country champion. His best marathon was a 2:09:15 taking third at Boston in 1988. John also attended Providence. In 1979, the brothers ran Connecticut's historic, Thanksgiving Day, Manchester Road Race, with John repeating his previous year's victory over nine-time race champion Amby Burfoot, breaking Burfoot's course record by 55 seconds with Ray finishing second, 59 seconds behind his brother. In 1981, Ray took second again, this time to legendary Irish runner, Eamonn Coghlan. John won the race again in 1984–85. His course record lasted until 1995.

== Coaching career ==
At Providence, Treacy has coached 65 All-Americans, including seven NCAA individual champions who have captured 15 NCAA titles. Eleven became Olympians. His men's cross country (XC) program went to the NCAA Championships in 19 of 22 seasons. The women's team qualified for the NCAA championships a record 27 out of 28 seasons and won 1995 and 2013 NCAA Cross Country Championships. They also took fourteen NCAA Northeast Regional Cross Country Championships and 22 Big East titles. In 1990, 1995, 2003, 2004, 2012, 2013, and 2015 his teams each finished within the regional top three, and the top four in the country. The 1990 women's team featured Sinead Delahunty, Geraldine Hendricken, and Anita Philpot earning All-American honors to lead the Friars to a second-place finish. In 1995 four women runners won NCAA All-American status. Treacy was named NCAA Division I Women's National Coach of the Year, and NCAA District I Women's Cross Country Coach of the Year. The women's 2003 season included Kim Smith and Mary Cullen finishing second and fifth, their team finishing third at the NCAA XC. In 2004 New Zealander Smith won the school's first individual NCAA Cross Country title and the team repeated for third. In 2012 Sarah Collins, Emily Sisson, and Laura Nagel carried Providence to a second-place finish at the NCAA Championships. The 2013 squad won the Big East and the NCAA Northeast regional titles. Sisson, Nagel and Collins led Providence to its second NCAA XC team title with Treacy being named the USFTCCCA's National Coach of the Year. In 2015, the three took the top three positions, once again securing the Northeast Regional title and a fourth-place NCAA finish. Treacy's men's teams captured 15 Big East titles and finished twice on the podium, in 1992 and 2000. In 1992, Providence won its third straight Big East title and second consecutive IC4A title en route to the third team spot at the NCAA XC championships. Mark Carroll finished fourth leading the Friars to a third-place finish. The team also finished third in 2000. That year the Friars won every meet prior to the NCAA XC Championships with Keith Kelly taking the first men's NCAA Individual XC title while his team finished third.

Treacy has coached nine Providence runners to individual NCAA track titles in events ranging between 1,500 and 10,000 meters. At the 1991 Penn Relays the college set the world record in the 4x1500 meter relay. In 2004 Smith was the first woman to win NCAA in both the Indoor 3,000 and 5,000 meters and took the Outdoor 5,000 meters while breaking the NCAA records in all three races. She was the first athlete to win both the 3,000 and 5,000 at the NCAA Indoor Track and Field Championships. Other NCAA Champions Indoor champions included Andy Keith, 1992, mile; Carroll; 5,000 meters in 1995; Hendricken, the 1992 3,000 meters; Amy Rudolph, the 1994 Mile and the Outdoor 1,500 meters. Marie McMahon took the Indoor 5,000 meters in 1996; Mary Cullen won the Outdoor 5,000 meters in 2006. Danette Doetzel captured the Outdoor 10,000 meters in 2009. Sisson took both the Indoor and Outdoor 5,000 meters in 2015. In 2013, Sisson and Nagel each won Big East individual titles. Sisson won the 10,000 meters, breaking Smith's meet record with a time of 33:02.80. Nagel won the 5,000 meter crown. Nagel and Shelby Greany earned All-American honors at the 2013 NCAA Outdoor Track and Field Championships. Sisson and Nagel finished sixth and twelfth in the 5,000 meters. Greany took 11th in the 3,000-meter steeplechase. In 2014, Sisson won the 5,000 meters, Nagel winning the Big East 3,000 meters and All American honors at the NCAA Indoor Championships. Sarah Collins posted the second-fastest time ever by a Providence College female runner in the 5,000 meters, running 15:31.03 at the Stanford Invitational. That year Collins claimed her first Big East title in the 10,000 meters and Nagel defended her 5,000-meter title. Both women finished the season at the NCAA Outdoor Track and Field Championships, earning Second-Team All-America honors in the 5,000 meters. In 2015 Julian Oakley was the eighth Friar under Treacy's tutelage to dip under the sub-four-minute mile mark, with a time of 3:58.89. During 2015, Sisson broke Smith's NCAA indoor 5,000-meter record with her 15:12.22 at the Big East Indoor Championships. She won three NCAA titles, was an eleven-time All-American and eleven time all Big East Conference. Sisson won her first NCAA title in the 5,000 meters indoors, repeating in the 5,000 meters at the NCAA Outdoor Championships. Sisson won seven Big East titles. She completed her Providence collegiate career tied for first with ten total All-America honors. During the 2016 Indoor track season, Oakley finished seventh in the NCAA Indoor mile. In the 2016 Outdoor season, Catarina Rocha won the Big East 5,000 meters and Brianna Ilarda the 3,000-meter Steeplechase. During the 2016 Cross Country season, the women captured and their fourth NCAA Northeast Regional Cross Country title in five years. In 2017, Millie Paladino would run the second fastest 1,500-meter time in Providence history.

Several of Treacy's student-athletes have gone on to leave their mark internationally. At the Atlanta Olympics in 1996, Sinead Delahunty represented Ireland in the 1,500 and McMahon and Rudolph ran the 5,000 meters. In the 2000 Sydney Olympics, Delahunty ran the 1,500 meters, Rudolph the women's 5,000 and Carroll ran for Ireland in the men's 5,000 meters. Smith, McMahon, Carroll and Maria McCambridge all competed in the 2004 Games in Athens, Greece. At the 2008 Beijing Olympics, Smith ran the 10,000 meters, McGettigan the steeplechase and for Ireland, Martin Fagan, the marathon. In London, in 2012, Smith ran the Olympic marathon, Canadian Dylan Wykes the men's marathon, and Stephanie Reilly, represented Ireland in the steeplechase. At the 2016 Rio de Janeiro Olympics, New Zealand's Julian Matthews ran the 1,500 meters. Also in Rio, Molly Huddle, a Notre Dame graduate now coached by Treacy, set the U.S. record for the 10,000. In 2019, Sisson beat her training partner Huddle in the Stanford Invitational 10K, then finished sixth in the 2019 London Marathon, her first try at the distance, with a time of 2:23:08. It was the second fastest ever debut marathon for an American woman, after Jordan Hasay's 2:23:00 at Boston in 2017. Huddle was the twelfth woman finisher, in 2:26:33.

Treacy coaches many outstanding professional runners. Three of the top five women's 10,000 meters finishers at the 2015 USA World Championship Trials, Huddle (1st), Amy Hastings-Cragg (4th), and Sisson (5th), were coached by Treacy. Sisson holds the NCAA 5,000-meter indoor record. Huddle also has the U.S. women's half-marathon record. On retiring in 2016, Smith held the New Zealand records for the 3,000 meters, 5,000 meters, 10,000 meters, half marathon, and marathon. Roisin McGettigan set the Irish 3,000-meter steeplechase record in 2003.

== Personal ==
He is married and has two sons.
