= John Treacy =

Irish distance runner, Olympian and sporting administrator

Personal information
- Born: June 4, 1957 (age 69) Villierstown, County Waterford

Sport
- Country: Ireland
- Sport: Athletics/Track, Long-distance running
- Events: 10,000 meters, 5000 meters, Half marathon, Marathon
- College team: Providence College

Achievements and titles
- Olympic finals: 1980 Moscow; 10,000 m, DNF; 5000 m, 7th; 1984 Los Angeles; Marathon, Silver; 10,000 m, 9th; 1988 Seoul; Marathon, DNF; 1992 Barcelona; Marathon, 51st
Medal record
Men's athletics
Representing Ireland
Olympic Games
| Silver medal – second place | 1984 Los Angeles | Marathon |
World Cross-Country Championships
| Bronze medal – third place | 1974 Monza | Junior Race |
| Bronze medal – third place | 1975 Rabat | Junior Race |
| Silver medal – second place | 1975 Rabat | Team Junior Men |
| Gold medal – first place | 1978 Glasgow | Long Race |
| Gold medal – first place | 1979 Limerick | Long Race |
| Silver medal – second place | 1979 Limerick | Team Long Race |
Boston Marathon
| Bronze medal – third place | 1988 Boston | Marathon |
| Bronze medal – third place | 1989 Boston | Marathon |

John Treacy (born 4 June 1957) is an Irish Olympian and former athlete, now a sporting administrator. He is best known for winning a silver medal in the marathon at the 1984 Summer Olympics in Los Angeles.

== Early life ==
Treacy was born in Villierstown, County Waterford. He attended St Anne's Post-Primary School in Cappoquin, County Waterford, Ireland, running more than seven miles to school every morning. He graduated from Providence College in the United States in 1978.

== Athletic career ==
=== Early Cross Country Success ===
As a 16 year-old, Treacy finished third in the Junior race of the 1974 IAAF World Cross Country Championships. Treacy then repeated this feat in the 1975 IAAF World Cross Country Championships and in the process helping Ireland to the Silver medal in the Junior Team competition.

Treacy won the 1978 IAAF World Cross Country Championships held in Bellahouston Park in Glasgow. The conditions were difficult with heavy mud on the ground and snow in the air. The following year, Treacy retained his title in the 1979 IAAF World Cross Country Championships Limerick, Ireland. The latter was a well known moment in Irish running history with Treacy winning in his home country in front of 25,000 spectators at Limerick Racecourse. He also won the British AAA Championships title in the 10,000 metres event at the 1979 AAA Championships.

=== 1980 Olympics to 1984 ===
Treacy was known as a tenacious runner who did not have an especially sharp final kick in track races. In the 1978 European Athletics Championships in Prague, he placed 11th in the fast 10,000-metre race and fourth in the slow and tactical 5,000-metre race, losing to Italy's Venanzio Ortis by just three tenths of a second. In the 5,000-metre final, he lingered behind Great Britain's Nick Rose on the final back straight just after Rose had dropped from the lead group.

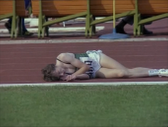
Treacy collapsed on the track during the 1980 Summer Olympics

In the 1980 Moscow Olympics, Treacy collapsed in his 10,000-metre heat with only 200 metres left, a victim of heat paralysis and dehydration. Because Treacy had been running in fourth place when he collapsed and because only the top four runners qualified directly for the final from the three heats, his collapse allowed Finnish four-time Olympic champion Lasse Virén, who had been trailing him, to qualify directly for the final. Having recovered from his heat-induced collapse, Treacy placed seventh in the 5,000-metre final of those Olympics.

In the 1983 World Athletics Championships in Helsinki, Finland, Treacy was eliminated in the 10,000-metre heats.

=== 1984 Olympics ===
In the 1984 Los Angeles Olympics, he placed ninth in the 10,000-metre final before crowning his athletics career with a silver medal in the men's marathon. Winner Carlos Lopes of Portugal was largely unchallenged for much of the race, with Treacy down the field until entering the top six around the 20-kilometre mark. Treacy continued to work his way up the rankings until entering the Los Angeles Coliseum stadium just behind second-placed British athlete Charlie Spedding. Treacy overtook Spedding with 150m to go, during which the Irish television commentary of Jimmy Magee listed the previous Irish Olympic medal winners up to that time, before culminating: "And for the 13th time, an Olympic medal goes to John Treacy from Villierstown in Waterford, the little man with the big heart."

Treacy's medal was Ireland's only medal of the games and placed Ireland 33rd in the final medals table.

=== 1985 to 1988 Olympics ===
In the 1985 IAAF World Cross Country Championships, Treacy finished fifth behind Carlos Lopes who had beaten him in the Olympic Marathon of the previous year.

At the 1986 European Athletics Championships in Stuttgart, he placed sixth in the 10,000-metre race. In the 1987 World Athletics Championships in Rome, he placed twenty-sixth in the 10,000-metre race and thirteenth in the 5,000-metre final.

Heading into the Seoul Olympics, Treacy won the 1988 Great North Run however he failed to finish the marathon at the 1988 Seoul Olympics.

=== Later Running Career ===
After the Seoul Olympics, While he did not win any more major international championships medals, Treacy did win the 1992 Los Angeles Marathon. Treacy also placed 51st in his final Olympic games in Barcelona in 1992 and won the 1993 Dublin Marathon.

Treacy ran competitively until 1995, retiring following a road race held in his honour in Waterford, attended by the other two medalists from the 1984 Olympic marathon, Carlos Lopes and Charlie Spedding.

== Post-running career ==
Treacy is currently chief executive of the Irish Sports Council. He is married to Fionnuala and they have four children: Caoimhe, Deirdre, Sean, and Conor.

He was awarded an Honorary Doctorate in his native Waterford by South East Technological University in November 2025.

== International competitions ==
| Year | Competition | Venue | Position | Event | Notes |
Representing Ireland
| 1984 | Olympic Games | Los Angeles, United States | 2nd | Marathon | 2:09:56 |
| 1988 | Boston Marathon | Massachusetts, United States | 3rd | Marathon | 2:09:15 |
| 1988 | Olympic Games | Seoul, South Korea | — | Marathon | DNF |
| 1992 | Los Angeles Marathon | Los Angeles, United States | 1st | Marathon | 2:12:29 |
| 1992 | Olympic Games | Barcelona, Spain | 51st | Marathon | 2:24:11 |

== See also ==
- Ireland at the 1984 Summer Olympics
- 1984 in athletics (track and field)
