= Tony Simmons (runner) =

Welsh athlete (born 1948)

Personal information
- Nationality: British (Welsh)
- Born: 6 October 1948 (age 77) Maesteg, Bridgend, Wales
- Height: 174 cm (5 ft 9 in)
- Weight: 59 kg (130 lb)

Sport
- Sport: Athletics
- Event: long-distance
- Club: Luton United AC
Medal record
Men's athletics
Representing Great Britain
European Championships
| Silver medal – second place | 1974 Rome | 10,000m |

Anthony Derrick Simmons (born 6 October 1948) is a male former athlete from Wales, who competed at the 1976 Summer Olympics.

== Biography ==
Simmons finished second behind Dave Bedford in the 10,000 metres event at the 1973 AAA Championships, which was a race where Bedford broke the world record.

Simmons represented England in the 1974 British Commonwealth Games, in Christchurch, New Zealand finishing seventh in the 10,000 metres. He won the silver medal in the 10,000 metres at the 1974 European Athletics Championships, finishing 4 hundredths of a second behind the gold medallist.

At the 1976 Summer Olympics he qualified for the final of the 10,000 metres, finishing 4th. Simmons set a world best for the half-marathon at Welwyn Garden City, England on 24 June 1978 of 62 minutes 47 seconds. The mark stood for nearly 16 months until eclipsed by Nick Rose. Two months after setting the world best time, he represented his birth country (Wales) in the 5,000 metres and 10,000 metres events, at the 1978 Commonwealth Games in Edmonton, Canada, finishing sixth in the 10,000 metres and seventh in the 5,000 metres.

== Personal bests ==
- 1 mile: 4:03.1, 19 July 1967, Motspur Park, New Malden, London (British record as an 18 year old at the time)
- 1500 metres: 3:41.1 min, 12 June 1977, Cwmbran
- 2000 metres: 5:05.32 min, 4 July 1975, London
- 3000 metres: 7:51.53 min, 23 August 1978, London
- 5000 metres: 13:21.2 min, 23 May 1976, Kiev
- 10,000 metres: 27:43.59 min, 30 June 1977, Helsinki
- Marathon: 2:12:33 h, 7 May 1978, Sandbach

Records
| Preceded by Miruts Yifter | Men's Half Marathon World Record Holder; 24 June 1978 – 14 October 1979 | Succeeded by Nick Rose |
Sporting positions
| Preceded by Miruts Yifter | Men's Half Marathon Best Year Performance; 1978 | Succeeded by Kirk Pfeffer |
