= 1978 IAAF World Cross Country Championships – Senior men's race =

Senior men's race at the 1978 IAAF World Cross Country Championships
- Organisers: IAAF
- Edition: 6th
- Date: March 25
- Host city: Glasgow, Scotland
- Venue: Bellahouston Park
- Events: 1
- Distances: 12.3 km – Senior men
- Participation: 168 athletes from 21 nations

The Senior men's race at the 1978 IAAF World Cross Country Championships was held in Glasgow, Scotland, at the Bellahouston Park on March 25, 1978. A report on the event was given in the Glasgow Herald.

Complete results, medallists, and the results of British athletes were published.

== Race results ==
=== Senior men's race (12.3 km) ===
==== Individual ====
Rank	Athlete	Country	Time
1st place, gold medalist(s)	John Treacy	Ireland	39:25
2nd place, silver medalist(s)	Aleksandr Antipov	Soviet Union	39:28
3rd place, bronze medalist(s)	Karel Lismont	Belgium	39:32
4	Tony Simmons	England	39:51
5	Guy Arbogast	United States	39:52
6	Craig Virgin	United States	39:54
7	Nat Muir	Scotland	40:00
8	Franco Fava	Italy	40:03
9	Enn Sellik	Soviet Union	40:08
10	Pierre Levisse	France	40:15
11	Steve Jones	Wales	40:15
12	Adelaziz Bouguerra	Tunisia	40:16
13	Lucien Rault	France	40:19
14	Gerry Deegan	Ireland	40:22
15	John Wild	England	40:25
16	Christoph Herle	West Germany	40:25
17	Luigi Zarcone	Italy	40:25
18	Radhouane Bouster	France	40:25
19	Andrew McKean	Scotland	40:29
20	Greg Meyer	United States	40:31
21	Leonid Moseyev	Soviet Union	40:35
22	Peter Baker	Wales	40:36
23	Hendrik Schoofs	Belgium	40:37
24	Allister Hutton	Scotland	40:42
25	Aleksandr Fedotkin	Soviet Union	40:42
26	Eric de Beck	Belgium	40:43
27	Santiago de la Parte	Spain	40:45
28	Neil Coupland	England	40:46
29	Jeff Wells	United States	40:47
30	Mike McLeod	England	40:48
31	Danny McDaid	Ireland	40:52
32	Alex Gonzalez	France	40:56
33	Eddie Leddy	Ireland	40:56
34	Michelangelo Arena	Italy	40:58
35	Thierry Watrice	France	40:58
36	Alex Hagelsteens	Belgium	40:58
37	Günther Zahn	West Germany	41:03
38	Rudi Schoofs	Belgium	41:06
39	Hans-Jürgen Orthmann	West Germany	41:08
40	Ken Newton	England	41:08
41	Michael Karst	West Germany	41:15
42	Steve Kenyon	England	41:16
43	Jean-Paul Gomez	France	41:18
44	Bill Rodgers	United States	41:20
45	Aniceto Simoes	Portugal	41:21
46	Manfred Schoeneberg	West Germany	41:22
47	Marc Smet	Belgium	41:23
48	Graham Tuck	England	41:26
49	Geert de Smet	Belgium	41:33
50	Donal Walsh	Ireland	41:33
51	Fernando Cerrada	Spain	41:34
52	Mike Roche	United States	41:35
53	Cándido Alario	Spain	41:37
54	Mohamed Zaidi	Tunisia	41:40
55	Aleksandr Kuznetsov	Soviet Union	41:44
56	Alwyn Dewhirst	England	41:44
57	Ivan Parluy	Soviet Union	41:44
58	José Luis González	Spain	41:46
59	Antonio Prieto	Spain	41:46
60	Neil Cusack	Ireland	41:48
61	Wolf-Dieter Poschmann	West Germany	41:49
62	Bernie Ford	England	41:50
63	Jean-Luc Paugam	France	41:50
64	Jean-Luc Lemire	France	41:52
65	Dietmar Millonig	Austria	41:52
66	Arturo Iacona	Italy	41:59
67	Frank Clement	Scotland	42:00
68	Peter Lindtner	Austria	42:01
69	Serhiy Olizarenko	Soviet Union	42:03
70	Anelio Bocci	Italy	42:06
71	Ray Treacy	Ireland	42:07
72	Marc Hunter	United States	42:08
73	Charles Vigil	United States	42:10
74	Henk Mentink	Netherlands	42:11
75	Michael Lane	Wales	42:11
76	Rafael Nunez	Spain	42:14
77	Dennis Fowles	Wales	42:14
78	Anacleto Pinto	Portugal	42:20
79	David Hopkins	Wales	42:22
80	Paul Lawther	Northern Ireland	42:26
81	Michele Cinà	Italy	42:27
82	Helder de Jesús	Portugal	42:28
83	Jo Schout	Netherlands	42:29
84	Ian Gilmour	Scotland	42:32
85	Abdelkrim Djelassi	Tunisia	42:32
86	Greg Hannon	Northern Ireland	42:33
87	Eddy Rombaux	Belgium	42:34
88	John McLaughlin	Northern Ireland	42:35
89	Piet Vonck	Netherlands	42:37
90	John Graham	Scotland	42:38
91	Gunnar Holm	Sweden	42:39
92	Bram Wassenaar	Netherlands	42:40
93	Lahcen El Hachmi	Morocco	42:40
94	Gerhard Hartmann	Austria	42:40
95	Mohamed Naoumi	Morocco	42:40
96	José Sena	Portugal	42:42
97	Laurence Reilly	Scotland	42:48
98	Dic Evans	Wales	42:51
99	Bobb Thomas	United States	42:54
100	Mansour Guettaya	Tunisia	42:54
101	Cherif Hannchi	Tunisia	42:56
102	Hussein Soltani	Tunisia	42:59
103	Peter Weigt	West Germany	43:00
104	Tony Brien	Ireland	43:02
105	Dominique Coux	France	43:02
106	David Gillanders	Sweden	43:02
107	Tonni Luttikhold	Netherlands	43:05
108	Ali Laanaya	Morocco	43:06
109	Clive Thomas	Wales	43:07
110	Nil Lavallee	Canada	43:08
111	Juan Manuel Sanchez Perez	Spain	43:11
112	Peter Moore	Canada	43:12
113	Ali Gammoudi	Tunisia	43:23
114	Jim Brown	Scotland	43:24
115	Carlos Tavares	Portugal	43:25
116	Abdelkader Zaddem	Tunisia	43:28
117	Tommie Pearson	Canada	43:31
118	Wolfgang Konrad	Austria	43:33
119	Gerry Hannon	Northern Ireland	43:35
120	Mikhail Ulymov	Soviet Union	
121	Erwin Wagger	Austria	43:41
122	Francisco Sánchez	Spain	43:42
123	Omar Anassi	Morocco	43:47
124	Tom Price	Northern Ireland	43:48
125	Richard Samuels	Wales	43:50
126	Peter Griffiths	Wales	43:52
127	José Abreu	Portugal	43:54
128	Josef Steiner	Austria	43:56
129	Abdeslam Outmani	Morocco	43:56
130	Dahou Belghazi	Morocco	43:58
131	Desmond McGann	Ireland	43:59
132	Rod Stone	Northern Ireland	44:03
133	Santiago Llorente	Spain	44:04
134	Mohamed Faquire	Morocco	44:07
135	Peet-Jan van Zyl	Netherlands	44:11
136	Norihiro Shinchi	Japan	44:29
137	Peter Pfeifenberger	Austria	44:31
138	Siglus Jonsson	Iceland	44:37
139	Mustapha Oulghazi	Morocco	44:42
140	Haddou Jaddour	Morocco	44:51
141	Akira Degouchi	Japan	45:05
142	Dave Welcher	Canada	45:07
143	Paul Williams	Canada	45:13
144	John White	Northern Ireland	45:14
145	Agust Thorsteinsson	Iceland	45:17
146	Chris McCubbins	Canada	45:27
147	Kazuyuki Ogane	Japan	45:30
148	Norikatsu Terui	Japan	45:30
149	Takaki Hata	Japan	45:32
150	Mike Teer	Northern Ireland	45:40
151	Tetsuji Ito	Japan	45:43
152	Yushin Kamuro	Japan	45:54
153	Aidan Donaldson	Northern Ireland	46:34
154	Haruyuki Tanaka	Japan	46:38
155	Ágúst Ásgeirsson	Iceland	47:12
156	Mineteru Sakamoto	Japan	48:46
157	Sigurdur Sigmundsson	Iceland	49:56
158	Harfteinn Oskarsson	Iceland	50:13
159	Einar Gudmundsson	Iceland	
—	Dan Glans	Sweden	DNF
—	Jos Hermens	Netherlands	DNF
—	Carlos Lopes	Portugal	DNF
—	Fernando Mamede	Portugal	DNF
—	Venanzio Ortis	Italy	DNF
—	Willy Polleunis	Belgium	DNF
—	Michael Lederer	West Germany	DNF
—	Carlos Cabral	Portugal	DNF
—	Philip Dolan	Scotland	DNF

==== Teams ====
Rank	Team	Points
1st place, gold medalist(s)	France: Pierre Levisse / 10; Lucien Rault / 13; Radhouane Bouster / 18; Alex Gonzalez / 32; Thierry Watrice / 35; Jean-Paul Gomez / 43; (Jean-Luc Paugam) / (63); (Jean-Luc Lemire) / (64); (Dominique Coux) / (105)	151
2nd place, silver medalist(s)	United States: Guy Arbogast / 5; Craig Virgin / 6; Greg Meyer / 20; Jeff Wells / 29; Bill Rodgers / 44; Mike Roche / 52; (Marc Hunter) / (72); (Charles Vigil) / (73); (Bobb Thomas) / (99)	156
3rd place, bronze medalist(s)	England: Tony Simmons / 4; Jon Wild / 15; Neil Coupland / 28; Mike McLeod / 30; Ken Newton / 40; Steve Kenyon / 42; (Graham Tuck) / (48); (Alwyn Dewhirst) / (56); (Bernie Ford) / (62)	159
4	Soviet Union: Aleksandr Antipov / 2; Enn Sellik / 9; Leonid Moseyev / 21; Aleksandr Fedotkin / 25; Aleksandr Kuznetsov / 55; Ivan Parluy / 57; (Serhiy Olizarenko) / (69); (Mikhail Ulymov) / (120)	169
5	Belgium: Karel Lismont / 3; Hendrik Schoofs / 23; Eric de Beck / 26; Alex Hagelsteens / 36; Rudi Schoofs / 38; Marc Smet / 47; (Geert de Smet) / (49); (Eddy Rombaux) / (87); (Willy Polleunis) / (DNF)	173
6	Ireland: John Treacy / 1; Gerry Deegan / 14; Danny McDaid / 31; Eddie Leddy / 33; Donal Walsh / 50; Neil Cusack / 60; (Ray Treacy) / (71); (Tony Brien) / (104); (Desmond McGann) / (131)	189
7	West Germany: Christoph Herle / 16; Günther Zahn / 37; Hans-Jürgen Orthmann / 39; Michael Karst / 41; Manfred Schoeneberg / 46; Wolf-Dieter Poschmann / 61; (Peter Weigt) / (103); (Michael Lederer) / (DNF)	240
8	Italy: Franco Fava / 8; Luigi Zarcone / 17; Michelangelo Arena / 34; Arturo Iacona / 66; Anelio Bocci / 70; Michele Cinà / 81; (Venanzio Ortis) / (DNF)	276
9	Scotland: Nat Muir / 7; Andrew McKean / 19; Allister Hutton / 24; Frank Clement / 67; Ian Gilmour / 84; John Graham / 90; (Laurence Reilly) / (97); (Jim Brown) / (114); (Philip Dolan) / (DNF)	291
10	Spain: Santiago de la Parte / 27; Fernando Cerrada / 51; Cándido Alario / 53; José Luis González / 58; Antonio Prieto / 59; Rafael Nunez / 76; (Juan Manuel Sanchez Perez) / (111); (Francisco Sánchez) / (122); (Santiago Llorente) / (133)	324
11	Wales: Steve Jones / 11; Peter Baker / 22; Michael Lane / 75; Dennis Fowles / 77; David Hopkins / 79; Dic Evans / 98; (Clive Thomas) / (109); (Richard Samuels) / (125); (Peter Griffiths) / (126)	362
12	Tunisia: Adelaziz Bouguerra / 12; Mohamed Zaidi / 54; Abdelkrim Djelassi / 85; Mansour Guettaya / 100; Cherif Hannchi / 101; Hussein Soltani / 102; (Ali Gammoudi) / (113); (Abdelkader Zaddem) / (116)	454
13	Portugal: Aniceto Simoes / 45; Anacleto Pinto / 78; Helder de Jesús / 82; José Sena / 96; Carlos Tavares / 115; José Abreu / 127; (Carlos Lopes) / (DNF); (Fernando Mamede) / (DNF); (Carlos Cabral) / (DNF)	543
14	Netherlands: Henk Mentink / 74; Jo Schout / 83; Piet Vonck / 89; Bram Wassenaar / 92; Tonni Luttikhold / 107; Peet-Jan van Zyl / 135; (Jos Hermens) / (DNF)	580
15	Austria: Dietmar Millonig / 65; Peter Lindtner / 68; Gerhard Hartmann / 94; Wolfgang Konrad / 118; Erwin Wagger / 121; Josef Steiner / 128; (Peter Pfeifenberger) / (137)	594
16	Northern Ireland: Paul Lawther / 80; Greg Hannon / 86; John McLaughlin / 88; Gerry Hannon / 119; Tom Price / 124; Rod Stone / 132; (John White) / (144); (Mike Teer) / (150); (Aidan Donaldson) / (153)	629
17	Morocco: Lahcen El Hachmi / 93; Mohamed Naoumi / 95; Ali Laanaya / 108; Omar Anassi / 123; Abdeslam Outmani / 129; Dahou Belghazi / 130; (Mohamed Faquire) / (134); (Mustapha Oulghazi) / (139); (Haddou Jaddour) / (140)	678
18	Canada: Nil Lavallee / 110; Peter Moore / 112; Tommie Pearson / 117; Dave Welcher / 142; Paul Williams / 143; Chris McCubbins / 146	770
19	Japan: Norihiro Shinchi / 136; Akira Degouchi / 141; Kazuyuki Ogane / 147; Norikatsu Terui / 148; Takaki Hata / 149; Tetsuji Ito / 151; (Yushin Kamuro) / (152); (Haruyuki Tanaka) / (154); (Mineteru Sakamoto) / (156)	872
20	Iceland: Siglus Jonsson / 138; Agust Thorsteinsson / 145; Ágúst Ásgeirsson / 155; Sigurdur Sigmundsson / 157; Harfteinn Oskarsson / 158; Einar Gudmundsson / 159	912

- Note: Athletes in parentheses did not score for the team result

== Participation ==
An unofficial count yields the participation of 168 athletes from 21 countries in the Senior men's race. This is in agreement with the official numbers as published.

- Austria (7)
- Belgium (9)
- Canada (6)
- England (9)
- France (9)
- Iceland (6)
- Ireland (9)
- Italy (7)
- Japan (9)
- Morocco (9)
- Netherlands (7)
- Northern Ireland (9)
- Portugal (9)
- Scotland (9)
- Spain (9)
- Soviet Union (8)
- Sweden (3)
- Tunisia (8)
- United States (9)
- Wales (9)
- West Germany (8)

== See also ==
- 1978 IAAF World Cross Country Championships – Junior men's race
- 1978 IAAF World Cross Country Championships – Senior women's race
