= 1978 IAAF World Cross Country Championships – Junior men's race =

Junior men's race at the 1978 IAAF World Cross Country Championships
- Organisers: IAAF
- Edition: 6th
- Date: March 25
- Host city: Glasgow, Scotland
- Venue: Bellahouston Park
- Events: 1
- Distances: 7.036 km – Junior men
- Participation: 91 athletes from 16 nations

The Junior men's race at the 1978 IAAF World Cross Country Championships was held in Glasgow, Scotland, at the Bellahouston Park on March 25, 1978. A report on the event was given in the Glasgow Herald.

Complete results, medallists, and the results of British athletes were published.

== Race results ==
=== Junior men's race (7.036 km) ===
==== Individual ====
Rank	Athlete	Country	Time
1st place, gold medalist(s)	Mick Morton	England	22:57
2nd place, silver medalist(s)	Rob Earl	Canada	23:10
3rd place, bronze medalist(s)	Francisco Alario	Spain	23:11
4	Constantino Esparcia	Spain	23:12
5	Ronnie Carroll	Ireland	23:14
6	Aleksandr Pasaryuk	Soviet Union	23:15
7	Viktor Zinovyev	Soviet Union	23:20
8	Kevin Dillon	Canada	23:22
9	Eddy de Pauw	Belgium	23:23
10	Rod Berry	United States	23:24
11	Brendan Quinn	Ireland	23:25
12	Yevgeniy Okorokov	Soviet Union	23:27
13	Eddie White	England	23:27
14	Rob Lonergan	Canada	23:27
15	David Beaver	England	23:29
16	Argimiro González	Spain	23:30
17	Ian Brown	Scotland	23:31
18	Dirk Mattheus	Belgium	23:35
19	Gelindo Bordin	Italy	23:36
20	Antonio Leitão	Portugal	23:37
21	Pietro Pani	Italy	23:40
22	Peter Daenens	Belgium	23:43
23	Marc de Blander	Belgium	23:46
24	Peter Elletson	England	23:47
25	Paul Schultz	United States	23:48
26	Dave Taylor	Ireland	23:50
27	Ian Campbell	Scotland	23:52
28	Patrick Deliveyne	Belgium	23:54
29	Jim Groves	Canada	23:55
30	Fulvio Costa	Italy	23:56
31	Valentin Rodríguez	Spain	23:57
32	Raymond Paulins	Canada	23:58
33	Fernando Miguel	Portugal	23:59
34	Saïd Aouita	Morocco	24:02
35	Andrey Kuznetsov	Soviet Union	24:04
36	Alastair Douglas	Scotland	24:05
37	Kevin Byrne	United States	24:06
38	Jeff Millieman	United States	24:06
39	Habib Romdani	Tunisia	24:08
40	Pascal Thiébaut	France	24:09
41	Roberto Visini	Italy	24:11
42	James Fallon	Ireland	24:12
43	Nikolay Yavorskiy	Soviet Union	24:17
44	Simon Catchpole	England	24:20
45	Gaetano Erba	Italy	24:21
46	Ezequiel Canario	Portugal	24:22
47	Assila Tebai	Tunisia	24:30
48	Mohamed Maazaoui	Morocco	24:31
49	Abdellah Benbaraka	Morocco	24:32
50	Tony Hatherly	Canada	24:33
51	Humberto Sequeira	Portugal	24:38
52	José Frias	Portugal	24:39
53	Francisco Cortés	Spain	24:41
54	Tim O'Neill	United States	24:42
55	Steve Ferri	United States	24:42
56	John Griffin	Ireland	24:43
57	Carlos Quirce	Spain	
58	Nourredine Benamor	Tunisia	
59	Adrian Stewart	England	24:48
60	Nigel Jones	Scotland	24:50
61	Carlos Pereira	Portugal	24:53
62	Keith Gallivan	Wales	24:54
63	Jean-Louis Carrel	France	24:57
64	John Gray	Scotland	25:02
65	Philippe Cros	France	25:04
66	Féthi Baccouche	Tunisia	25:05
67	Mohamed Ngueri	Morocco	25:07
68	Eddie Patterson	Northern Ireland	25:11
69	Mark Donnelly	Wales	25:11
70	Steve Blakemore	Wales	25:12
71	Ali Daasa	Tunisia	25:13
72	Jean-Baptiste Protais	France	25:22
73	Mohamed Benaissa	Morocco	25:23
74	Tom Breen	Northern Ireland	25:24
75	Sean Miller	Northern Ireland	25:24
76	Patrick Hiron	France	25:33
77	Dominique Vernochet	France	25:36
78	David Norris	Northern Ireland	25:38
79	Simon Axon	Wales	25:43
80	Ieuan Ellis	Wales	25:46
81	Robert McWatt	Scotland	25:48
82	Tom Melville	Northern Ireland	25:49
83	Mohamed El Bali	Morocco	25:55
84	Paul Moloney	Ireland	26:32
85	Sani Jeji	Nigeria	26:42
86	Sallah Abashi	Nigeria	27:30
87	John Davou	Nigeria	28:41
88	Gyane Davou	Nigeria	28:52
89	Mbok Likita	Nigeria	29:52
90	James Tsenment	Nigeria	30:08
—	Colin Clarkson	Wales	DNF

==== Teams ====
Rank	Team	Points
1st place, gold medalist(s)	England: Mick Morton / 1; Eddie White / 13; David Beaver / 15; Peter Elletson / 24; (Simon Catchpole) / (44); (Adrian Stewart) / (59)	53
2nd place, silver medalist(s)	Canada: Rob Earl / 2; Kevin Dillon / 8; Rob Lonergan / 14; Jim Groves / 29; (Raymond Paulins) / (32); (Tony Hatherly) / (50)	53
3rd place, bronze medalist(s)	Spain: Francisco Alario / 3; Constantino Esparcia / 4; Argimiro González / 16; Valentin Rodríguez / 31; (Francisco Cortés) / (53); (Carlos Quirce) / (57)	54
4	Soviet Union: Aleksandr Pasaryuk / 6; Viktor Zinovyev / 7; Yevgeniy Okorokov / 12; Andrey Kuznetsov / 35; (Nikolay Yavorskiy) / (43)	60
5	Belgium: Eddy de Pauw / 9; Dirk Mattheus / 18; Peter Daenens / 22; Marc de Blander / 23; (Patrick Deliveyne) / (28)	72
6	Ireland: Ronnie Carroll / 5; Brendan Quinn / 11; Dave Taylor / 26; James Fallon / 42; (John Griffin) / (56); (Paul Moloney) / (84)	84
7	United States: Rod Berry / 10; Paul Schultz / 25; Kevin Byrne / 37; Jeff Millieman / 38; (Tim O'Neill) / (54); (Steve Ferri) / (55)	110
8	Italy: Gelindo Bordin / 19; Pietro Pani / 21; Fulvio Costa / 30; Roberto Visini / 41; (Gaetano Erba) / (45)	111
9	Scotland: Ian Brown / 17; Ian Campbell / 27; Alastair Douglas / 36; Nigel Jones / 60; (John Gray) / (64); (Robert McWatt) / (81)	140
10	Portugal: Antonio Leitão / 20; Fernando Miguel / 33; Ezequiel Canario / 46; Humberto Sequeira / 51; (José Frias) / (52); (Carlos Pereira) / (61)	150
11	Morocco: Saïd Aouita / 34; Mohamed Maazaoui / 48; Abdellah Benbaraka / 49; Mohamed Ngueri / 67; (Mohamed Benaissa) / (73); (Mohamed El Bali) / (83)	198
12	Tunisia: Habib Romdani / 39; Assila Tebai / 47; Nourredine Benamor / 58; Féthi Baccouche / 66; (Ali Daasa) / (71)	210
13	France: Pascal Thiébaut / 40; Jean-Louis Carrel / 63; Philippe Cros / 65; Jean-Baptiste Protais / 72; (Patrick Hiron) / (76); (Dominique Vernochet) / (77)	240
14	Wales: Keith Gallivan / 62; Mark Donnelly / 69; Steve Blakemore / 70; Steve Axon / 79; (Ieuan Ellis) / (80); (Colin Clarkson) / (DNF)	280
15	Northern Ireland: Eddie Patterson / 68; Tom Breen / 74; Sean Miller / 75; David Norris / 78; (Tom Melville) / (82)	295
16	Nigeria: Sani Jeji / 85; Sallah Abashi / 86; John Davou / 87; Gyane Davou / 88; (Mbok Likita) / (89); (James Tsenment) / (90)	346

- Note: Athletes in parentheses did not score for the team result

== Participation ==
An unofficial count yields the participation of 91 athletes from 16 countries in the Junior men's race, one athlete less than the official number published.

- Belgium (5)
- Canada (6)
- England (6)
- France (6)
- Ireland (6)
- Italy (5)
- Morocco (6)
- Nigeria (6)
- Northern Ireland (5)
- Portugal (6)
- Scotland (6)
- Spain (6)
- Soviet Union (5)
- Tunisia (5)
- United States (6)
- Wales (6)

== See also ==
- 1978 IAAF World Cross Country Championships – Senior men's race
- 1978 IAAF World Cross Country Championships – Senior women's race
