= Giro di Castelbuono =

Coordinates: 37.9324°N 14.0875°E

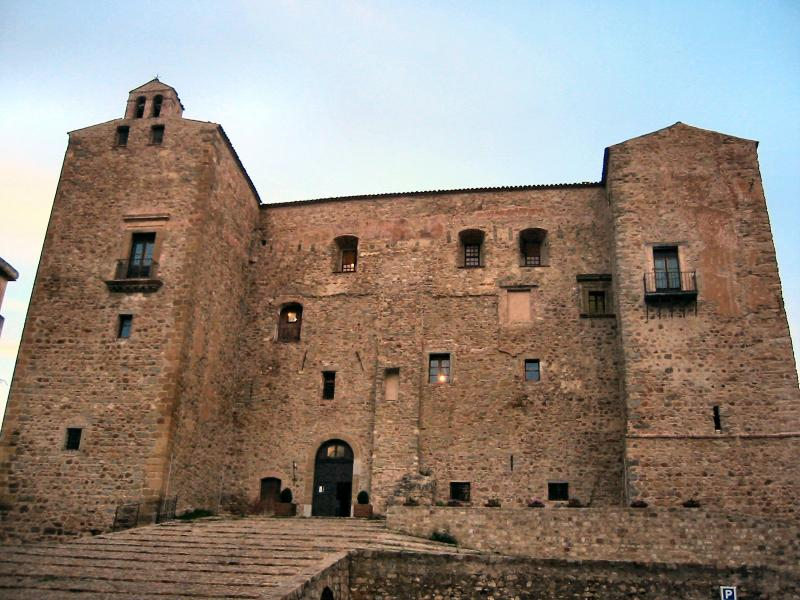
- The Castello dei Ventimiglia sits at the centre of the small town
- Date: Late July
- Location: Castelbuono, Sicily, Italy
- Event type: Road
- Distance: 11.2 km
- Established: 2000
- Website: Official website

The Giro di Castelbuono (officially Giro Podistico Internazionale Castelbuono) is an annual road running competition over 10 kilometres which takes place in Castelbuono, on the island of Sicily, Italy. First held in 1912, the competition, which holds IAAF Gold Label Road Race status, is one of the oldest road races in Europe, which is the inspiration for the event's nickname – la Corsa più antica ("The Oldest Race"). The race, typically held on (or around) July 26 to coincide with Saint Anne's Day, has been held almost every year since its inauguration, although the two World Wars interrupted the event over those periods. The race has been broadcast every year for a decade by Italian television channel Rai Sport Più.

From 2011 onwards, the race departed from its long-standing original distance of 11.3 kilometres and switched to a certified 10 km circuit. From 1912 to 2010, the course of the race followed a looped pattern of ten laps of roughly 1.13 km around the historical centre of the town. The start and end point of the race was at Piazza Margherita. Beginning at the square, the route went south along Via Roma and into Via Mario Levante. It then went east along Via Camillo Benso Conte Di Cavour before heading back north along Via Vittorio Emanuele II. The course then followed Via Umberto I in a north-westerly direction which arrives back at the starting point. The race is a challenging one for athletes as they must contend with a difficult uphill section on each lap.

Over the history of the event, the Giro di Castelbuono has attracted many of the sport's top athletes. Among the past winners are former world record holders Khalid Khannouchi and Paul Tergat, three-time London Marathon winner Martin Lel, and four-time road running World Champion Zersenay Tadese. The pre-international era of the race also featured prominent runners, including Gelindo Bordin, Orlando Pizzolato, Venanzio Ortis, Franco Fava, as well as Sicily's own Luigi Zarcone. While the competition has principally been a men's race throughout its existence, a women's race was featured on the programme from 1995 to 2004. Winners of this short-lived race included Rome Marathon winner Gloria Marconi, Florence Marathon winner Florence Barsosio and multiple Major Marathon champion Margaret Okayo.

== Past winners ==
=== National era ===
Edition	Year	Men's winner	Time (m:s)	Club
1st	1912	Giovanni Blanchetè	51:36	S.S. Ercole Palermo
2nd	1913	Giovanni Blanchetè	50:15	S.S. Ercole Palermo
3rd	1914	Sgr. Scelta	48:20	S.S. Sport Club Palermo
—	1915–1919	Not held due to World War I		
4th	1920	Ignazio Militello	?	S.S. Sport Club Termini Imerese
5th	1921	Agatino Mascali	44:40	S.S. Pro Etna Catania
6th	1922	Agatino Mascali	42:50	S.S. Pro Etna Catania
7th	1923	Agatino Mascali	43:10	S.S. Pro Etna Catania
8th	1924	Agatino Mascali	42:10	S.S. Pro Etna Catania
9th	1925	Gaetano Spreafico	41:26	S.S. Pro Patria Busto Arsizio
10th	1926	Gaetano Spreafico	?	S.S. Pro Patria Busto Arsizio
11th	1927	Gaetano Citarrella	41:30	Ferriera Ercta Palermo
12th	1928	Gaetano Citarrella	41:55	M.V.S.N. Palermo
—	1929–30	Not held		
13th	1931	Giuseppe Lombardo	42:20	F.G. Reggio Calabria
14th	1932	Domenico La Bianca	41:08	S.S. Unione S. Italia Palermo
15th	1933	Domenico La Bianca	41:50	S.S. Unione S. Italia Palermo
16th	1934	Domenico La Bianca	41:00	S.S. Unione S. Italia Palermo
17th	1935	Ercole Morello	?	S.S. Sport Club Palermo
—	1936	Not held		
18th	1937	Salvatore Merlino	?	F.G. Bagheria
19th	1938	Nicola Ruggeri	?	G.U.F. Messina
20th	1939	Nicola Ruggeri	?	G.U.F. Messina
—	1940–41	Not held due to World War II		
21st	1942	Antonio Fontana	?	VV.FF. Palermo
—	1943–45	Not held due to World War II		
22nd	1946	Sgr. Renda	?	G.P.U. Messina
23rd	1947	Giovanni Cultrone	39:40	S.S. Fiamma Vittoria
24th	1948	Giulio Panico	38:35	G.S. Sangiovannese Napoli
25th	1949	Giovanni Cultrone	?	S.S. Fiamma Vittoria
26th	1950	Giovanni Cultrone	?	S.S. Fiamma Vittoria
27th	1951	Pietro Balistreri	39:45	Corpo VV.FF. Palermo
28th	1952	Antonino Calderone	?	C.A.S. Termini Imerese
29th	1953	Antonino Calderone	?	C.A.S. Termini Imerese
30th	1954	Domenico Cappuccio	?	C.S.I. Maurolico Messina
31st	1955	Giovanni Cultrone	?	U.S. Fiamma Vittoria
32nd	1956	Stefano Bucolo	?	Alt. Falcone Novara
33rd	1957	Carmelo Di Stefano	40:55	C.S.I. Messina
—	1958	Not held		
34th	1959	Tommaso Assi	38:17	C.S. Ass. Generali Palermo
35th	1960	Mario Longo	?	Libertas Catania
36th	1961	Stefano Bucolo	38:27	Alt. Falcone Novara
37th	1962	Felice Scotto	38:13	U.S. Polimeni Reggio Calabria
38th	1963	Antonino Buffa	41:09	Libertas Catania
39th	1964	Francesco Sabatino	38:11	Libertas Catania
40th	1965	Benedetto Mastroieni	37:42	Telestar Palermo
41st	1966	Giuseppe Ardizzone	37:06	Mongibello Catania
42nd	1967	Benedetto Mastroieni	39:00	Corpo VV.FF. Palermo
43rd	1968	Francesco Amante	37:00	Libertas Catania
44th	1969	Vito Riolo	36:40	Libertas Catania
45th	1970	Gioacchino De Palma	36:12	CUS Bari
46th	1971	Francesco Amante	36:17	CUS Torino
47th	1972	Francesco Amante	36:21	CUS Torino
48th	1973	Giuseppe Ardizzone	35:38	S.S. Alco Rieti
49th	1974	Michelangelo Arena	34:45	Polisportiva Atletica Palermo
50th	1975	Paolo Accaputo	34:54	Fiamme Gialle Roma
51st	1976	Luigi Zarcone	34:27	CUS Palermo
52nd	1977	Franco Fava	34:10	Fiamme Gialle Roma
53rd	1978	Venanzio Ortis	34:22	Fiamme Oro Padova
54th	1979	Orlando Pizzolato	34:40	Lemar Schio
55th	1980	Claudio Solone	33:45	Carabinieri Bologna
56th	1981	Claudio Solone	33:46	Carabinieri Bologna
57th	1982	Michelangelo Arena	34:07	Fiamme Gialle Roma
58th	1983	Orlando Pizzolato	34:50	Champion Ferrara
59th	1984	Orlando Pizzolato	33:34	Champion Ferrara
60th	1985	Salvatore Nicosia	33:56	Fiamme Gialle Roma
61st	1986	Salvatore Nicosia	34:03	Fiamme Gialle Roma
62nd	1987	Gelindo Bordin	33:27	Alitrans Verona
63rd	1988	Gelindo Bordin	33:27	Alitrans Verona
64th	1989	Salvatore Bettiol	32:45	CUS Ferrara

=== International era ===
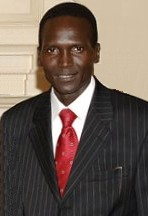
Kenyan Paul Tergat is a two-time men's winner.

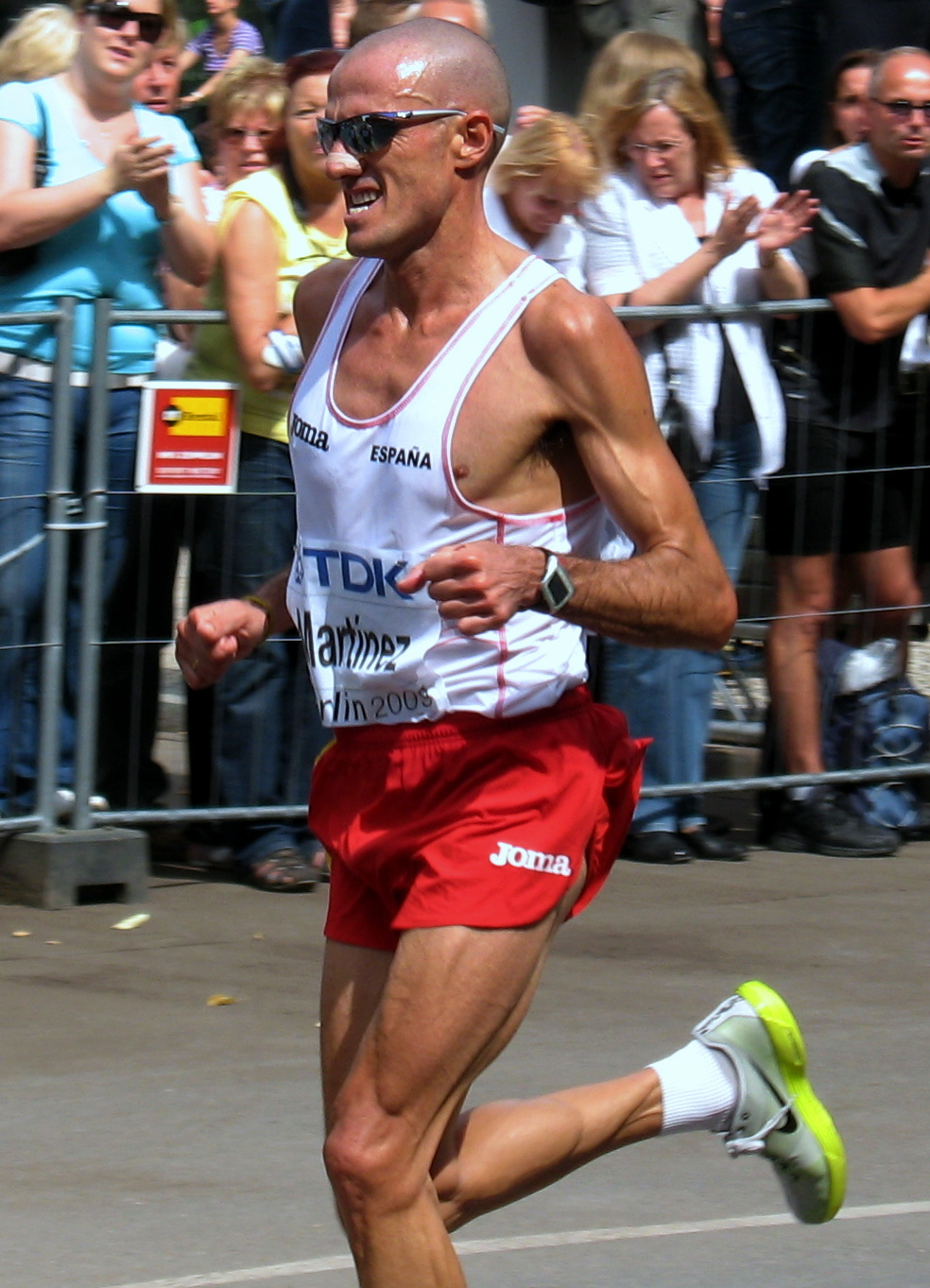
Spain's Chema Martínez became the first European man to win in the international era in 2007.

- The course distances are 11.3 km for men and 5.6 km for women, unless stated otherwise

Key: Course record 10 km course 4.5 km course

Edition	Year	Men's winner	Time (m:s)	Women's winner	Time (m:s)
65th	1990	Jonah Koech (KEN)	33:27	Not held	
66th	1991	Boay Akonay (TAN)	33:11	Not held	
67th	1992	Jonah Koech (KEN)	32:49	Not held	
68th	1993	Joseph Cheromei (KEN)	32:36	Not held	
69th	1994	Paul Tergat (KEN)	32:37	Not held	
70th	1995	Germán Silva (MEX)	32:56	Maria Curatolo (ITA)	14:37
71st	1996	William Kiptum (KEN)	33:23	Florence Barsosio (KEN)	18:43
72nd	1997	David Chelule (KEN)	32:35	Florence Barsosio (KEN)	18:41
73rd	1998	Khalid Khannouchi (MAR)	33:17	Agata Balsamo (ITA)	18:57
74th	1999	Hendrick Ramaala (RSA)	33:05	Gloria Marconi (ITA)	19:07
75th	2000	Benson Barus (KEN)	33:23	Silvia Sommaggio (ITA)	18:27
76th	2001	Benson Barus (KEN)	33:01	Daniela Rodica (FRA)	18:11
77th	2002	Benson Barus (KEN)	34:21	Nadia Ejjafini (MAR)	19:13
78th	2003	Paul Tergat (KEN)	34:28	Merima Denboba (ETH)	19:03
79th	2004	Martin Lel (KEN)	33:46	Margaret Okayo (KEN)	18:54
80th	2005	Wilson Kebenei (KEN)	34:25	Not held	
81st	2006	Robert Cheruiyot (KEN)	35:14	Not held	
82nd	2007	José Manuel Martínez (ESP)	34:19	Not held	
83rd	2008	Ibrahim Jeilan (ETH)	34:44	Not held	
84th	2009	Vincent Kipruto (KEN)	34:02	Not held	
85th	2010	Zersenay Tadese (ERI)	34:20	Not held	
86th	2011	Geoffrey Mutai (KEN)	29:05	Not held	
87th	2012	Tariku Bekele (ETH)	30:01	Not held	
88th	2013	Wilson Kiprop (KEN)	30:10	Not held	
89th	2014	Ghirmay Ghebreslassie (ERI)	30:31	Not held	
90th	2015	Geoffrey Korir (KEN)	30:30	Not held	
91st	2016	Félicien Muhitira (RWA)	31:01	Not held	
92nd	2017	Rodgers Kwemoi (KEN)	34:20	Not held	
93rd	2018	Onesphore Nzikwinkunda (BDI)	34:54	Not held	
94th	2019	Tadese Worku (ETH)	34:33	Not held	
2020 not held due to COVID-19				Not held	
95th	2021	Mark Lomuket (KEN)	35:17	Not held	
96th	2022	Isaac Too (KEN)	34:57	Not held	
97th	2023	Muktar Edris (ETH)	33:56	Not held	
98th	2024	Ilias Fifa (ESP)	35:31		

== See also ==
- BOclassic
- Memorial Peppe Greco
