= Athletics at the 1979 Summer Universiade – Men's 3000 metres steeplechase =

The men's 3000 metres steeplechase event at the 1979 Summer Universiade was held at the Estadio Olimpico Universitario in Mexico City on 11 September 1979.

== Results ==
Rank	Athlete	Nationality	Time	Notes
1st place, gold medalist(s)	Paul Copu	Romania	8:57.7	
2nd place, silver medalist(s)	Mariano Scartezzini	Italy	8:58.1	
3rd place, bronze medalist(s)	Michele Cinà	Italy	9:08.7	
4	Michael Karst	West Germany	9:10.5	
5	Dan Betini	Romania	9:10.7	
6	Amos Korir	Kenya	9:14.7	
7	Octavio Guadarrama	Mexico	9:17.3	
8	Juan Zetina	Mexico	9:17.8	
9	Hillary Tuwei	Kenya	9:19.5	
10	Sam James	United States	9:34.0	
11	Peter Daenens	Belgium	9:40.6	
12	Antonio Calderón	Colombia	10:03.5	
