= 1977 NCAA Division I cross country championships =

1977 cross-country running meet of the NCAA (Division I)

Coordinates: 47.541°N 117.379°W

1977 NCAA Division I Men's Cross Country Championships
- Organisers: NCAA
- Edition: 39th
- Date: November 21, 1977
- Host city: Spokane, Washington (Washington State University)
- Venue: Hangman Valley Golf Course
- Distances: 10 km (6.21 miles)
- Participation: 255 athletes

Location in the United States
Location in Washington

The 1977 NCAA Division I Men's Cross Country Championships were the 39th annual cross country meet to determine the team and individual national champions of NCAA Division I men's collegiate cross country running in the United States. Held on November 21, it was hosted by Washington State University at Hangman Valley Golf Course, near Spokane, Washington.

Washington State previously hosted four years earlier in 1973, also at Hangman Valley, south of the city. The distance for this race was 10 kilometers (6.21 miles) and the approximate average elevation was 1,900 feet (580 m) above sea level.

All Division I cross country teams were eligible to qualify for the meet through their placement at various regional qualifying meets. In total, 29 teams and 255 individual runners contested this championship.

The team national championship was won by the Oregon Ducks, their fourth title. The individual championship was retained by Henry Rono, from Washington State, with a time of 28:33.50. This was Rono's second individual title; he would go on to win again in 1979.

== Men's title ==
- Distance: 10.0 km (6.21 miles)

=== Team Result (Top 10) ===
Rank	Team	Points
1st place, gold medalist(s)	Oregon	100
2nd place, silver medalist(s)	UTEP	105
3rd place, bronze medalist(s)	Wyoming	186
4	Providence	205
5	BYU	235
6	Wisconsin	241
7	East Tennessee State	252
8	Tennessee	260
9	Arizona	262
10	Colorado	303

=== Individual Result (Top 10) ===
Rank	Name	Nationality	Time
1st place, gold medalist(s)	(Kenya) Henry Rono	Washington State	28:33.50
2nd place, silver medalist(s)	(Republic of Ireland) John Treacy	Providence	28:51.00
3rd place, bronze medalist(s)	(Republic of Ireland) Gerard Deegan	Providence	28:56.90
4	(United States) Marc Hunter	Cleveland State	29:02.20
5	(Kenya) Joel Cheruiyot	Washington State	29:02.40
6	(Kenya) Solomon Chebor	Wyoming	29:03.40
7	(Kenya) Simon Kilili	Wyoming	29:15.10
8	(United States) Thom Hunt	Arizona	29:15.90
9	(United States) Alberto Salazar	Oregon	29:20.80
10	(United States) Thomas Wysocki	Nevada–Reno	29:30.80

== See also ==
- NCAA Men's Division II Cross Country Championship
- NCAA Men's Division III Cross Country Championship
