= Stanley Biwott =

Kenyan long-distance runner

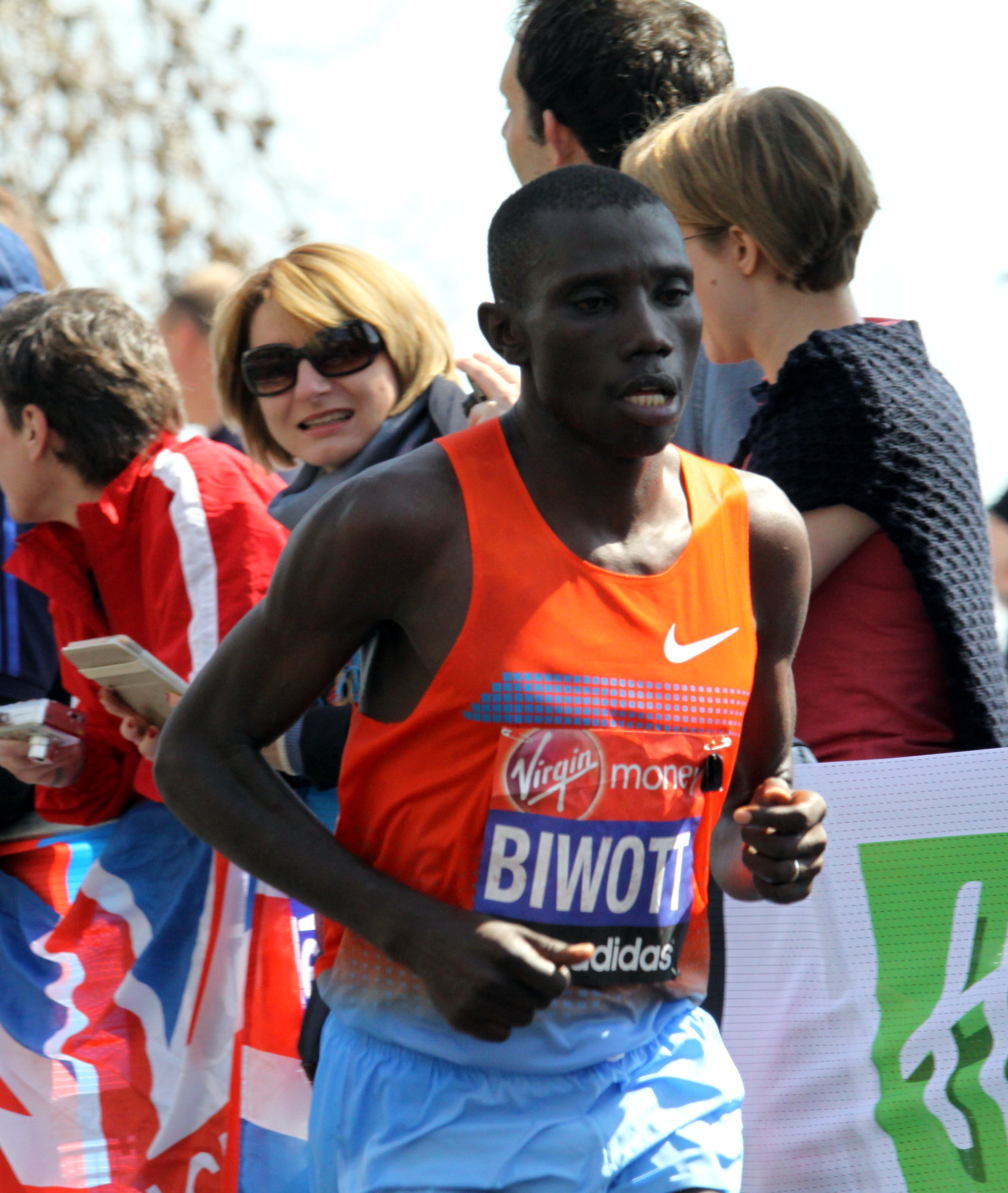
Stanley Biwott

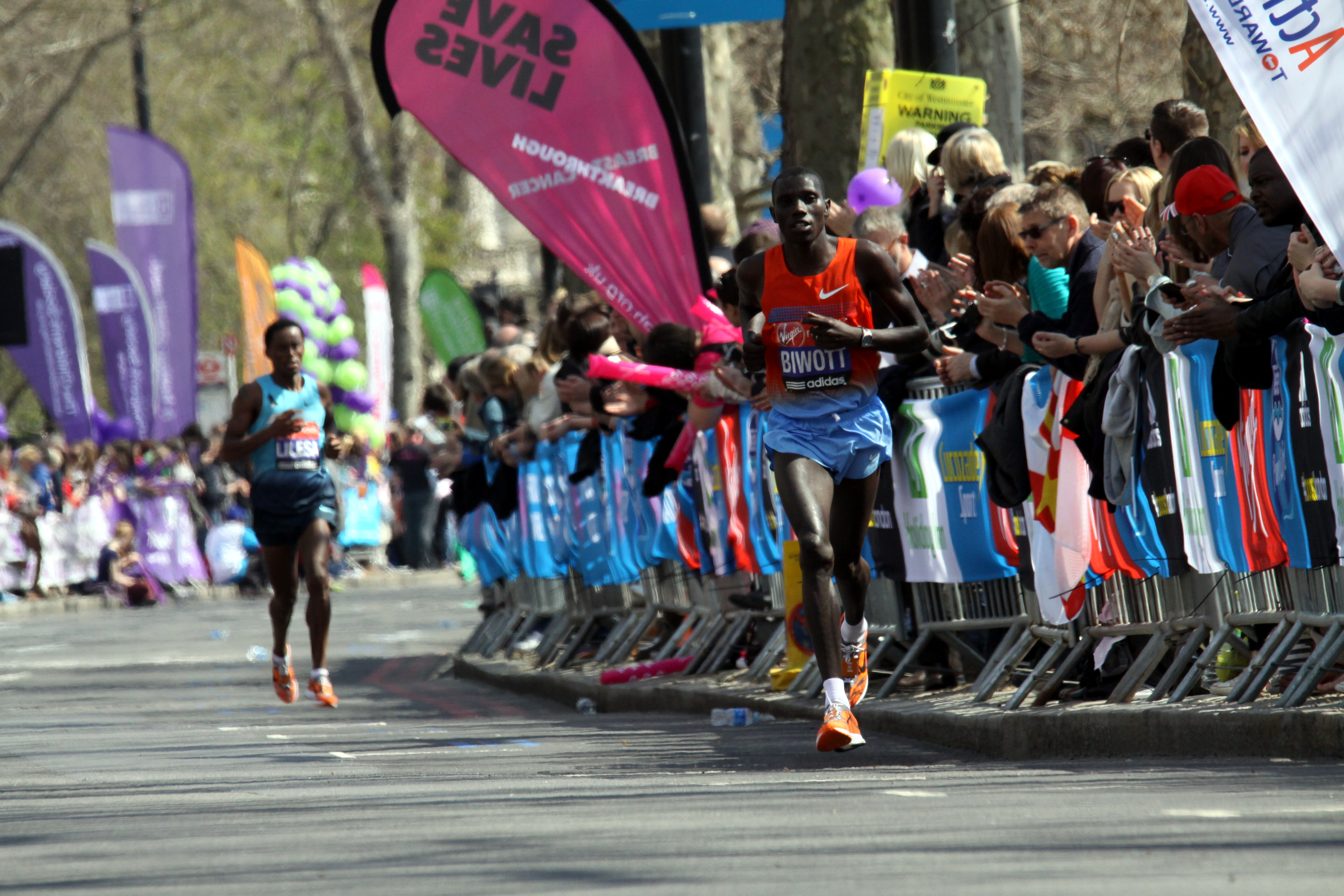
Stanley Biwott during 2013 London Marathon

Stanley Kipleting Biwott (born 21 April 1986) is a Kenyan long-distance runner who competes in half marathon and marathon races. He won the 2012 Paris Marathon in a course record time of 2:05:11 hours and the 2015 New York City Marathon. His half marathon best is 58:56 minutes.

== Career ==
He began working with Italian coach Claudio Berardelli in 2006 and came seventh at that year's Carpi Marathon. He was employed as the pacemaker at the Roma-Ostia Half Marathon the following February and he finished third with a time of 1:01:20 hours behind his training partners Benson Barus and Jonathan Kosgei Kipkorir.

He headed to Brazil in 2009 and came sixth at the Pampulha Lagoon International Race, then seventh at the Saint Silvester Road Race. His first marathon win came the year after at the São Paulo Marathon and his time of 2:11:19 hours was the fastest ever on the South American soil. He dipped under two hours and ten minutes for the first time at the 2010 Reims à Toutes Jambes, where he was three seconds behind the winner Stephen Chebogut with a finishing time of 2:09:41 hours.

At the start of 2011 he improved his half marathon best to 1:00:23 hours in winning the Azkoitia-Azpeitia Half Marathon. At the Chuncheon Marathon he outran his teammate Jonathan Kosgei Kipkorir and won the race in a personal best of 2:07:03 hours – a course record and personal best by more than two minutes. He ended the year with a third place at the Zhuhai Half Marathon, losing out in a sprint finish.

Biwott began 2012 with his first sub-one hour half marathon; his finishing time of 59:44 minutes was enough to win the Paris Half Marathon in a course record. Reaching a new career high, he recorded a marathon best of 2:05:11 hours to win the Paris Marathon a month later. He took the lead after the halfway point and continued at a fast pace to claim the prestigious course record. In the latter half of the road racing season he won both the Beach to Beacon 10K and the Falmouth Road Race. He was a comfortable winner at the Philadelphia Half Marathon, finishing forty seconds ahead of the field.

His first race of 2013 of the Ras Al Khaimah Half Marathon where he finished as runner-up to Geoffrey Kipsang, running a best of 58:56 minutes to move up to tenth on the all-time lists.

At the 2014 London Marathon Biwott ran a career best time of 2:04:55 to finish in 2nd place.

In March 2015, he won the City-Pier-City-Loop half marathon in the fastest time of the season (00:59:20).

In November 2015, he won the 2015 New York City Marathon in 2:10:34.

At the 2016 London Marathon he improved his career best to 2:03:51, coming second behind Eliud Kipchoge and placing him sixth on the all-time ranking list.

== Marathons ==
Year	Competition	Venue	Position	Notes
2006	Carpi Marathon	Carpi, Italy	7th	2:14:24
2010	São Paulo International Marathon	São Paulo, Brazil	1st	2:11:19
2010	Reims Marathon	Reims, France	2nd	2:09:41
2011	Chuncheon Marathon	Chuncheon, South Korea	1st	2:07:03
2012	Paris Marathon	Paris, France	1st	2:05:12
2012	Shanghai Marathon	Shanghai, China	3rd	2:09:05
2013	London Marathon	London, United Kingdom	8th	2:08:39
2013	New York City Marathon	New York City, United States	5th	2:10:41
2014	London Marathon	London, United Kingdom	2nd	2:04:55
2015	London Marathon	London, United Kingdom	4th	2:06:41
2015	2015 New York City Marathon	New York City, United States	1st	2:10:34
2016	London Marathon	London, United Kingdom	2nd	2:03:51
2016	Olympic Games	Rio de Janeiro, Brazil	DNF	—
2018	Abu Dhabi Marathon	Abu Dhabi, United Arab Emirates	4th	2:09:18
