= 1978 IAAF World Cross Country Championships =

- Organisers: IAAF
- Edition: 6th
- Date: 25 March
- Host city: Glasgow, Scotland
- Venue: Bellahouston Park
- Events: 3
- Distances: 12.3 km – Senior men 7.036 km – Junior men 4.728 km – Senior women
- Participation: 358 athletes from 27 nations

The 1978 IAAF World Cross Country Championships was held in Glasgow, Scotland, at the Bellahouston Park on 25 March 1978. A report on the event was given in the Glasgow Herald.

Complete results for men, junior men, women, medallists, and the results of British athletes were published.

== Medallists ==
| Event | Gold | | Silver | | Bronze | |
|---|---|---|---|---|---|---|
Individual
| Senior men (12.3 km) | John Treacy; Ireland | 39:25 | Aleksandr Antipov; Soviet Union | 39:28 | Karel Lismont; Belgium | 39:32 |
| Junior men (7.036 km) | Mick Morton; England | 22:57 | Rob Earl; Canada | 23:10 | Francisco Alario; Spain | 23:11 |
| Senior women (4.728 km) | Grete Waitz; Norway | 16:19 | Natalia Mărăşescu; Romania | 16:49 | Maricica Puică; Romania | 16:59 |
Team
| Senior men | France | 151 | United States | 156 | England | 159 |
| Junior men | England | 53 | Canada | 53 | Spain | 54 |
| Senior women | Romania | 30 | United States | 37 | England | 55 |

== Race results ==
=== Senior men's race (12.3 km) ===
Individual race
| Rank | Athlete | Country | Time |
|---|---|---|---|
| 1st place, gold medalist(s) | John Treacy | Ireland | 39:25 |
| 2nd place, silver medalist(s) | Aleksandr Antipov | Soviet Union | 39:28 |
| 3rd place, bronze medalist(s) | Karel Lismont | Belgium | 39:32 |
| 4 | Tony Simmons | England | 39:51 |
| 5 | Guy Arbogast | United States | 39:52 |
| 6 | Craig Virgin | United States | 39:54 |
| 7 | Nat Muir | Scotland | 40:00 |
| 8 | Franco Fava | Italy | 40:03 |
| 9 | Enn Sellik | Soviet Union | 40:08 |
| 10 | Pierre Levisse | France | 40:15 |
| 11 | Steve Jones | Wales | 40:15 |
| 12 | Adelaziz Bouguerra | Tunisia | 40:16 |
Full results

Teams
| Rank | Team | Points |
|---|---|---|
| 1st place, gold medalist(s) | France: Pierre Levisse / 10; Lucien Rault / 13; Radhouane Bouster / 18; Alex Gonzalez / 32; Thierry Watrice / 35; Jean-Paul Gomez / 43; (Jean-Luc Paugam) / (63); (Jean-Luc Lemire) / (64); (Dominique Coux) / (105) | 151 |
| 2nd place, silver medalist(s) | United States: Guy Arbogast / 5; Craig Virgin / 6; Greg Meyer / 20; Jeff Wells / 29; Bill Rodgers / 44; Mike Roche / 52; (Marc Hunter) / (72); (Charles Vigil) / (73); (Bobb Thomas) / (99) | 156 |
| 3rd place, bronze medalist(s) | England: Tony Simmons / 4; Jon Wild / 15; Neil Coupland / 28; Mike McLeod / 30; Ken Newton / 40; Steve Kenyon / 42; (Graham Tuck) / (48); (Alwyn Dewhirst) / (56); (Bernie Ford) / (62) | 159 |
| 4 | Soviet Union | 169 |
| 5 | Belgium | 173 |
| 6 | Ireland | 189 |
| 7 | West Germany | 240 |
| 8 | Italy | 276 |
Full results

- Note: Athletes in parentheses did not score for the team result

=== Junior men's race (7.036 km) ===
Individual race
| Rank | Athlete | Country | Time |
|---|---|---|---|
| 1st place, gold medalist(s) | Mick Morton | England | 22:57 |
| 2nd place, silver medalist(s) | Rob Earl | Canada | 23:10 |
| 3rd place, bronze medalist(s) | Francisco Alario | Spain | 23:11 |
| 4 | Constantino Esparcia | Spain | 23:12 |
| 5 | Ronnie Carroll | Ireland | 23:14 |
| 6 | Aleksandr Pasaryuk | Soviet Union | 23:15 |
| 7 | Viktor Zinovyev | Soviet Union | 23:20 |
| 8 | Kevin Dillon | Canada | 23:22 |
| 9 | Eddy de Pauw | Belgium | 23:23 |
| 10 | Rod Berry | United States | 23:24 |
| 11 | Brendan Quinn | Ireland | 23:25 |
| 12 | Yevgeniy Okorokov | Soviet Union | 23:27 |
Full results

Teams
| Rank | Team | Points |
|---|---|---|
| 1st place, gold medalist(s) | England: Mick Morton / 1; Eddie White / 13; David Beaver / 15; Peter Elletson / 24; (Simon Catchpole) / (44); (Adrian Stewart) / (59) | 53 |
| 2nd place, silver medalist(s) | Canada: Rob Earl / 2; Kevin Dillon / 8; Rob Lonergan / 14; Jim Groves / 29; (Raymond Paulins) / (32); (Tony Hatherly) / (50) | 53 |
| 3rd place, bronze medalist(s) | Spain: Francisco Alario / 3; Constantino Esparcia / 4; Argimiro González / 16; Valentin Rodríguez / 31; (Francisco Cortés) / (53); (Carlos Quirce) / (57) | 54 |
| 4 | Soviet Union | 60 |
| 5 | Belgium | 72 |
| 6 | Ireland | 84 |
| 7 | United States | 110 |
| 8 | Italy | 111 |
Full results

- Note: Athletes in parentheses did not score for the team result

=== Senior women's race (4.728 km) ===
Individual race
| Rank | Athlete | Country | Time |
|---|---|---|---|
| 1st place, gold medalist(s) | Grete Waitz | Norway | 16:19 |
| 2nd place, silver medalist(s) | Natalia Mărăşescu | Romania | 16:49 |
| 3rd place, bronze medalist(s) | Maricica Puică | Romania | 16:59 |
| 4 | Julie Shea | United States | 17:12 |
| 5 | Cornelia Bürki | Switzerland | 17:13 |
| 6 | Monika Greschner | West Germany | 17:14 |
| 7 | Jan Merrill | United States | 17:17 |
| 8 | Georgeta Gazibara | Romania | 17:18 |
| 9 | Joyce Smith | England | 17:23 |
| 10 | Carmen Valero | Spain | 17:26 |
| 11 | Kathy Mills | United States | 17:27 |
| 12 | Christine Benning | England | 17:28 |
Full results

Teams
| Rank | Team | Points |
|---|---|---|
| 1st place, gold medalist(s) | Romania: Natalia Mărăşescu / 2; Maricica Puică / 3; Georgeta Gazibara / 8; Antoaneta Iacob / 17; (Fiţa Lovin) / (26) | 30 |
| 2nd place, silver medalist(s) | United States: Julie Shea / 4; Jan Merrill / 7; Kathy Mills / 11; Brenda Webb / 15; (Cindy Bremser) / (23); (Judy Graham) / (85) | 37 |
| 3rd place, bronze medalist(s) | England: Joyce Smith / 9; Christine Benning / 12; Penny Yule / 16; Mary Stewart / 18; (Kath Binns) / (28); (Wendy Smith) / (43) | 55 |
| 4 | West Germany | 85 |
| 5 | Poland | 122 |
| 6 | Ireland | 152 |
| 7 | Spain | 159 |
| 8 | Norway | 165 |
Full results

- Note: Athletes in parentheses did not score for the team result

== Medal table (unofficial) ==
| Rank | Nation | Gold | Silver | Bronze | Total |
|---|---|---|---|---|---|
| 1 | England (ENG) | 2 | 0 | 2 | 4 |
| 2 | Romania (ROU) | 1 | 1 | 1 | 3 |
| 3 | France (FRA) | 1 | 0 | 0 | 1 |
| 3 | Ireland (IRL) | 1 | 0 | 0 | 1 |
| 3 | Norway (NOR) | 1 | 0 | 0 | 1 |
| 6 | Canada (CAN) | 0 | 2 | 0 | 2 |
| 6 | United States (USA) | 0 | 2 | 0 | 2 |
| 8 | Soviet Union (URS) | 0 | 1 | 0 | 1 |
| 9 | Spain (ESP) | 0 | 0 | 2 | 2 |
| 10 | Belgium (BEL) | 0 | 0 | 1 | 1 |
| Totals (10 entries) | | 6 | 6 | 6 | 18 |

- Note: Totals include both individual and team medals, with medals in the team competition counting as one medal.

== Participation ==
An unofficial count yields the participation of 358 athletes from 27 countries. This is in agreement with the official numbers as published.

- Austria (7)
- Belgium (19)
- Canada (18)
- Denmark (5)
- England (21)
- France (21)
- Iceland (6)
- Ireland (21)
- Italy (17)
- Japan (9)
- Morocco (15)
- Netherlands (12)
- Nigeria (6)
- Northern Ireland (14)
- Norway (5)
- Poland (6)
- Portugal (15)
- Romania (5)
- Scotland (21)
- Soviet Union (18)
- Spain (21)
- Sweden (3)
- Switzerland (4)
- Tunisia (13)
- United States (21)
- Wales (21)
- West Germany (14)

== See also ==
- 1978 IAAF World Cross Country Championships – Senior men's race
- 1978 IAAF World Cross Country Championships – Junior men's race
- 1978 IAAF World Cross Country Championships – Senior women's race
- 1978 in athletics (track and field)
