= Marc Hunter (athlete) =

American long-distance runner

Personal information
- Nationality: American
- Born: March 5, 1956 (age 70) Brunswick, Ohio

Sport
- Sport: Track
- Event(s): 5000 meters, 10,000 meters
- College team: Cleveland State

Achievements and titles
- Personal best(s): 5000m: 13:36.70; 10,000m: 28:40.80

Marc Hunter (born March 5, 1956) is an American former distance runner. He ran for the United States at the 1978 IAAF World Cross Country Championships. He is the father of runner Drew Hunter.

== Running career ==
=== High school ===
Hunter attended Brunswick High School in Ohio, where he graduated in 1974. During his time in high school, he competed in cross country and track. He was the runner-up at Ohio's 1972 state cross country meet, and then won the 1973 state cross meet. He was also the Ohio High School DI State champion in the mile in 1973 and 1974. As a high schooler, he recorded a personal best of 4:14 in the mile.

=== Collegiate ===
Hunter spent his first two years at Kent State University where he led the Golden Flashes to back-to-back NCAA Cross Country Championship meets. Hunter transferred to Cleveland State University, where he continued to compete in cross country and track. During his time at Cleveland State, he ran in two consecutive NCAA DI Cross Country Championships, finishing in fourth overall in 1977 and sixth in 1978. In 1978, as a collegian, he ran for the United States' squad in the men's race at the 1978 IAAF World Cross Championships, where he finished in 72nd place overall.

=== Post-collegiate ===
After undergraduate studies, Hunter was selected by the post-collegiate racing team Athletics West from Eugene, Oregon. He raced at the men's race at the 1979 IAAF World Cross Country Championships, this time finishing in 49th place. Hunter ran his fastest 10K on the track at the 1979 AAU Championships, where he placed fifth in the men's 10,000 in a time of 28:40.8. Also in 1979 he ran his 5K PR of 13:36.7 winning the Tom Black Classic in Knoxville, TN. In 1980, three weeks before the Olympic Trials, he won the now-famous Bolder Boulder 10k.
