= Benson Barus =

Kenyan long-distance runner (born 1980)

Medal record

Men's athletics

Representing Kenya

World Junior Championships
Gold medal – first place	1998 Annecy	10,000 m

Benson Kipchumba Barus (born 4 July 1980) is a Kenyan long-distance runner who competes in marathon and half marathon competitions. He has a personal best of 2:07:07 hours for the distance, set at the 2011 Prague Marathon, which he won. He also won the 2009 Turin Marathon and has placed top three in Rome, Beijing and Chuncheon.

He was the 10,000 metres World Junior Champion in 1998. Based in Italy, working with Federico Rosa and Claudio Berardelli, Barus has won numerous road races in the country, including the Giro di Castelbuono, Giro Media Blenio, Udine Half Marathon and Roma-Ostia Half Marathon. His best for the half marathon is 59:41 minutes.

== Career ==
Born in Nakuru, capital of the Rift Valley Province, Benson Barus is of the Tugen ethnic group, which has also produced runners including Paul Tergat. Barus had his first success as a teenager competing at the junior level, taking the gold medal over 10,000 metres at the 1998 World Junior Championships in Athletics. He began to focus on road running competitions and, being managed by Italian Federico Rosa and trained by Claudio Berardelli, he ran in a number of races in Italy. He had consecutive victories at the Amatrice-Configno race in 2000 and 2001, and also took three straight wins at the Giro di Castelbuono from 2000 to 2002. He was the winner of the 10.5 km race at the 2001 Miglianico Tour. Running at the 2001 Kenyan Championships, he achieved a personal best of 28:09.32 minutes over 10,000 m on the track, but this was not enough to make the team for the 2001 World Championships in Athletics as he came fifth overall.

Barus had a series of circuit wins in Italy in early 2002, claiming first place at the Montefortiana Turà, Corrida di San Geminiano, Trofeo Sant'Agata, Vivicittà Firenze 12K, Giro Media Blenio, and the Luzerner Stadtlauf. A 10K best of 27:52 minutes came at a race in Gualtieri in April 2003 and this proved to be one of the fastest runs by any athlete in the world that year. He won Cesena's Notturna di San Giovanni 10K race later that year. He served as the pacemaker for the Carpi Marathon that October, leading up to the half-way point. Returning to competitive racing the next year, Martin Lel beat him into second place at the 2004 Trofeo Sant'Agata, but he defeated all opposition at the Corrida di San Geminiano race. He won the 25th edition of the Golden Shoe 8 km Road Race in April. Barus made his debut over the half marathon distance at the 2004 Udine Half Marathon and he set a best of 1:01:31 hours, taking fourth.

He won in a course record time of 1:01:14 at the 2005 Nice Half Marathon. After taking pacemaking duties at the City-Pier-City Loop, He set bests at the Berlin Half Marathon (fourth in 60:57 min) and the Rotterdam Half Marathon (fourth in 60:17 min). A month after his race in Rotterdam, he made his marathon debut at the Milano City Marathon and established himself as a top competitor in the event, taking the runner-up spot behind Benson Kipchumba Cherono in a time of 2:08:33 hours. It was the fastest marathon race in the country that year.

He took back-to-back wins over the half marathon in February the next year, taking the title at the Eldoret Half Marathon in Kenya and then the Roma-Ostia Half Marathon. He made his second outing over the full distance at the JoongAng Seoul Marathon in November and recorded another sub-2:10 time, being edged into fourth place by Ethiopian Yerefu Berhanu. In 2008 he served as the pacemaker for the Rome City Marathon, a run which was his preparation for the Paris Marathon the month after, where his time of 2:09:23 brought him ninth in a high quality field. He completed his first half marathon under an hour to win the Udine race and his course record of 59:41 minutes ranked him as the eleventh fastest runner that year. His next marathon came in Frankfurt and he remained consistent in his time, recording 2:08:57 for fifth in a Kenyan sweep of the top fourteen.

He paced the field in course record time at the 2009 Brescia Marathon, going on to win the Turin Marathon in rainy conditions. He retained his title at the Udine Half Marathon in September and at the Beijing Marathon he yet again dipped under 2:09, coming third behind Samuel Mugo and Nicholas Manza. He was among the favourites for the 2010 Rome Marathon and came second behind Siraj Gena. Attempting a third straight win, he entered the Udine Half Marathon, but he had to settle for the runner-up spot behind William Chebor. He headed to Korea for October's Chuncheon Marathon and he had his third second-place finish of the year, finishing behind Benjamin Kiptoo Kolum.

The 2011 season marked a high as he won the Prague Marathon in 2:07:07 hours (more than a minute faster than he had run before). He ran at the Virginia Beach Half Marathon as preparation for the Beijing Marathon in September. He won over the shorter distance in a time of 1:02:22 hours and placed top three in the Chinese marathon. The 2012 Daegu Marathon saw him run one of his fastest marathon times in his career and his mark of 2:08:36 hours was enough for third. He made only two more outings that year: he won the Porto Half Marathon, then came fourth at the Gyeongju International Marathon.
