= 1978 NCAA Division I cross country championships =

1978 cross-country running meet of the NCAA (Division I)

1978 NCAA Division I Men's Cross Country Championships
- Organisers: NCAA
- Edition: 40th
- Date: November 20, 1978
- Host city: Madison, WI; University of Wisconsin–Madison
- Venue: Yahara Hills Golf Course
- Distances: 10 km (6.21 mi)
- Participation: 241 athletes

The 1978 NCAA Division I Men's Cross Country Championships were the 40th annual cross country meet to determine the team and individual national champions of NCAA Division I men's collegiate cross country running in the United States. Held on November 20, 1978, the meet was hosted by the University of Wisconsin–Madison at the Yahara Hills Golf Course in Madison, Wisconsin. The distance for this race was 10 kilometers (6.21 miles).

All Division I cross country teams were eligible to qualify for the meet through their placement at various regional qualifying meets. In total, 29 teams and 241 individual runners contested this championship.

The team national championship was won by the UTEP Miners, their fourth title. The individual championship was won by Alberto Salazar, from Oregon, with a time of 29:29.70.

== Men's title ==
- Distance: 10,000 meters (6.21 miles)

=== Team Result (Top 10) ===
Rank	Team	Points
1st place, gold medalist(s)	UTEP	56
2nd place, silver medalist(s)	Oregon	72
3rd place, bronze medalist(s)	Wisconsin	134
4	Penn State	220
5	Colorado	234
6	Tennessee; Arizona	247
7	Indiana	252
8	Colorado State	254
9	Arkansas	300
10	Minnesota	301

=== Individual Result (Top 10) ===
Rank	Name	Nationality	Time
1st place, gold medalist(s)	(United States) Alberto Salazar	Oregon	29:29.70
2nd place, silver medalist(s)	(Kenya) Michael Musyoki	UTEP	29:39.20
3rd place, bronze medalist(s)	(United States) Thom Hunt	Arizona	29:34.10
4	(Tanzania) Suleiman Nyambui	UTEP	29:35.90
5	(United States) Steve Lacy	Wisconsin	29:36.50
6	(United States) Marc Hunter	Cleveland State	29:39.70
7	(United States) Don Clary	Oregon	29:47.30
8	(United States) James Schankel	Cal Poly–San Luis Obispo	29:48.00
9	(United States) Robert Snyder	Penn State	29:48.20
10	(United States) Dan Henderson	Wheaton (IL)	29:48.50

== See also ==
- NCAA Men's Division II Cross Country Championship
- NCAA Men's Division III Cross Country Championship
