= 1978 IAAF World Cross Country Championships – Senior women's race =

Senior women's race at the 1978 IAAF World Cross Country Championships
- Organisers: IAAF
- Edition: 6th
- Date: March 25
- Host city: Glasgow, Scotland
- Venue: Bellahouston Park
- Events: 1
- Distances: 4.728 km – Senior women
- Participation: 99 athletes from 18 nations

The Senior women's race at the 1978 IAAF World Cross Country Championships was held in Glasgow, Scotland, at the Bellahouston Park on March 25, 1978. A report on the event was given in the Glasgow Herald.

Complete results, medallists, and the results of British athletes were published.

== Race results ==
=== Senior women's race (4.728 km) ===
==== Individual ====
Rank	Athlete	Country	Time
1st place, gold medalist(s)	Grete Waitz	Norway	16:19
2nd place, silver medalist(s)	Natalia Mărăşescu	Romania	16:49
3rd place, bronze medalist(s)	Maricica Puică	Romania	16:59
4	Julie Shea	United States	17:12
5	Cornelia Bürki	Switzerland	17:13
6	Monika Greschner	West Germany	17:14
7	Jan Merrill	United States	17:17
8	Georgeta Gazibara	Romania	17:18
9	Joyce Smith	England	17:23
10	Carmen Valero	Spain	17:26
11	Kathy Mills	United States	17:27
12	Christine Benning	England	17:28
13	Agnese Possamai	Italy	17:32
14	Mary Purcell	Ireland	17:35
15	Brenda Webb	United States	17:36
16	Penny Yule	England	17:37
17	Antoaneta Iacob	Romania	17:37
18	Mary Stewart	England	17:39
19	Tatyana Kazankina	Soviet Union	17:43
20	Celina Sokolowska	Poland	17:44
21	Christa Vahlensieck	West Germany	17:45
22	Judith Shepherd	Scotland	17:50
23	Cindy Bremser	United States	17:51
24	Kathy d'Arcy	Canada	17:53
25	Brigitte Kraus	West Germany	17:54
26	Fiţa Lovin	Romania	17:55
27	Renata Pyrr	Poland	17:56
28	Kath Binns	England	17:57
29	Renata Pentlinowska	Poland	17:58
30	Joëlle De Brouwer	France	17:59
31	Veronica Duffy	Ireland	18:01
32	Loa Olafsson	Denmark	18:01
33	Renate Kieninger	West Germany	18:02
34	Tineke Kluft	Netherlands	18:03
35	Cristina Tomasini	Italy	18:05
36	Connie Olsen	Denmark	18:05
37	Pilar Fernandez	Spain	18:06
38	Nancy Rooks	Canada	18:06
39	Chantal Navarro	France	18:09
40	Nina Snyrikova	Soviet Union	18:12
41	Margherita Gargano	Italy	18:13
42	Joëlle Audibert	France	18:14
43	Wendy Smith	England	18:15
44	Nadine Claes	Belgium	18:15
45	Maria Mödl	West Germany	18:17
46	Monika Gaisjier	Poland	18:17
47	Monique Seys	Belgium	18:18
48	Christine Ward	Ireland	18:18
49	Mona Kleppe	Norway	18:18
50	Encarnación Escudero	Spain	18:18
51	Marijke Moser	Switzerland	18:20
52	Brigit de Nijs	Netherlands	18:20
53	Magda Ilands	Belgium	18:20
54	Magda Kubasiewicz	Canada	18:21
55	Véronique Renties	France	18:23
56	Svetlana Ulmasova	Soviet Union	18:28
57	Heidi Vien	Norway	18:29
58	Oddrun Mosling	Norway	18:29
59	Kate Davis	Ireland	18:30
60	Carla Beurskens	Netherlands	18:35
61	Elsbeth Liebi	Switzerland	18:36
62	Montserrat Abello	Spain	18:41
63	Hilary Hollick	Wales	18:43
64	Bernadette van Roy	Belgium	18:44
65	Denise Verhaert	Belgium	18:45
66	May-Britt Stange	Norway	18:46
67	Sara Neil	Canada	18:48
68	Derbhla Mellerick	Ireland	18:50
69	Margaret Coomber	Scotland	18:50
70	Raisa Sadreydinova	Soviet Union	18:52
71	Danuta Zbiewski	Poland	18:53
72	Ulrike Kullmann	West Germany	18:54
73	Annie van Stiphout	Netherlands	18:55
74	Gabriela Gorzynska	Poland	18:59
75	Barbara Bendler	Switzerland	19:01
76	Mercedes Calleja	Spain	19:04
77	Janet Downton	Canada	19:05
78	Viviane Croisé	France	19:07
79	Fiona McQueen	Scotland	19:12
80	Lone Dybdahl	Denmark	19:13
81	Amelia Lorza Lopez	Spain	19:14
82	Annick Loir	France	19:17
83	Jean Lochhead	Wales	19:19
84	Siobhan Lonergan	Ireland	19:33
85	Judy Graham	United States	19:47
86	Kersti Jakobsen	Denmark	19:55
87	Janet Higgins	Scotland	19:59
88	Karin de Nijs	Netherlands	20:03
89	Kerry Robinson	Scotland	20:07
90	Valentina Ilynikh	Soviet Union	20:09
91	Violet Hope	Scotland	20:19
92	Anna James	Wales	20:28
93	Ann-Marie Fox	Wales	20:37
94	Karina Bennike	Denmark	21:10
95	Jean Cameron	Canada	
96	Ann Disley	Wales	
97	Carol Nicholas	Wales	
—	Silvana Cruciata	Italy	DNF
—	Gabriella Dorio	Italy	DNF

==== Teams ====
Rank	Team	Points
1st place, gold medalist(s)	Romania: Natalia Mărăşescu / 2; Maricica Puică / 3; Georgeta Gazibara / 8; Antoaneta Iacob / 17; (Fiţa Lovin) / (26)	30
2nd place, silver medalist(s)	United States: Julie Shea / 4; Jan Merrill / 7; Kathy Mills / 11; Brenda Webb / 15; (Cindy Bremser) / (23); (Judy Graham) / (85)	37
3rd place, bronze medalist(s)	England: Joyce Smith / 9; Christine Benning / 12; Penny Yule / 16; Mary Stewart / 18; (Kath Binns) / (28); (Wendy Smith) / (43)	55
4	West Germany: Monika Greschner / 6; Christa Vahlensieck / 21; Brigitte Kraus / 25; Renate Kieninger / 33; (Maria Mödl) / (45); (Ulrike Kullmann) / (72)	85
5	Poland: Celina Sokolowska / 20; Renata Pyrr / 27; Renata Pentlinowska / 29; Monika Gaisjier / 46; (Danuta Zbiewski) / (71); (Gabriela Gorzynska) / (74)	122
6	Ireland: Mary Purcell / 14; Veronica Duffy / 31; Christine Ward / 48; Kate Davis / 59; (Derbhla Mellerick) / (68); (Siobhan Lonergan) / (84)	152
7	Spain: Carmen Valero / 10; Pilar Fernandez / 37; Encarnación Escudero / 50; Montserrat Abello / 62; (Mercedes Calleja) / (76); (Amelia Lorza Lopez) / (81)	159
8	Norway: Grete Waitz / 1; Mona Kleppe / 49; Heidi Vien / 57; Oddrun Mosling / 58; (May-Britt Stange) / (66)	165
9	France: Joëlle De Brouwer / 30; Chantal Navarro / 39; Joëlle Audibert / 42; Véronique Renties / 55; (Viviane Croisé) / (78); (Annick Loir) / (82)	166
10	Canada: Kathy d'Arcy / 24; Nancy Rooks / 38; Magda Kubasiewicz / 54; Sara Neil / 67; (Janet Downton) / (77); (Jean Cameron) / (95)	183
11	Soviet Union: Tatyana Kazankina / 19; Nina Snyrikova / 40; Svetlana Ulmasova / 56; Raisa Sadreydinova / 70; (Valentina Ilynikh) / (90)	185
12	Switzerland: Cornelia Bürki / 5; Marijke Moser / 51; Elsbeth Liebi / 61; Barbara Bendler / 75	192
13	Belgium: Nadine Claes / 44; Monique Seys / 47; Magda Ilands / 53; Bernadette van Roy / 64; (Denise Verhaert) / (65)	208
14	Netherlands: Tineke Kluft / 34; Brigit de Nijs / 52; Carla Beurskens / 60; Annie van Stiphout / 73; (Karin de Nijs) / (88)	219
15	Denmark: Loa Olafsson / 32; Connie Olsen / 36; Lone Dybdahl / 80; Kersti Jakobsen / 86; (Karina Bennike) / (94)	234
16	Scotland: Judith Shepherd / 22; Margaret Coomber / 69; Fiona McQueen / 79; Janet Higgins / 87; (Kerry Robinson) / (89); (Violet Hope) / (91)	257
17	Wales: Hilary Hollick / 63; Jean Lochhead / 83; Anna James / 92; Ann-Marie Fox / 93; (Ann Disley) / (96); (Carol Nicholas) / (97)	331
DNF	Italy: (Agnese Possamai) / (13); (Cristina Tomasini) / (35); (Margherita Gargano) / (41); (Silvana Cruciata) / (DNF); (Gabriella Dorio) / (DNF)	DNF

- Note: Athletes in parentheses did not score for the team result

== Participation ==
An unofficial count yields the participation of 99 athletes from 18 countries in the Senior women's race, one athlete less than the official number published.

- Belgium (5)
- Canada (6)
- Denmark (5)
- England (6)
- France (6)
- Ireland (6)
- Italy (5)
- Netherlands (5)
- Norway (5)
- Poland (6)
- Romania (5)
- Scotland (6)
- Soviet Union (5)
- Spain (6)
- Switzerland (4)
- United States (6)
- Wales (6)
- West Germany (6)

== See also ==
- 1978 IAAF World Cross Country Championships – Senior men's race
- 1978 IAAF World Cross Country Championships – Junior men's race
