= 2015 New York City Marathon =

Footrace held in New York City

45th New York City Marathon
- Venue: New York, United States
- Date: November 1

Champions
- Men: Stanley Biwott (2:10:34)
- Women: Mary Jepkosgei Keitany (2:24:25)
- Wheelchair men: Ernst van Dyk (1:30:54)
- Wheelchair women: Tatyana McFadden (1:43:04)

The 2015 New York City Marathon was the 45th running of the annual marathon race in New York City, New York, which took place on November 1. The event was organised by the New York Road Runners and sponsored by Tata Consultancy Services (TCS). The main race saw the third successive time that Kenyans won both races. Stanley Biwott won the men's division with a time of 2:10:34. His compatriot Mary Jepkosgei Keitany claimed the women's division with a time of 2:24:25, her second consecutive win in New York. In the wheelchair divisions, South African Ernst van Dyk won the men's division with a time of 1:30:54 and American Tatyana McFadden won the women's division with a new record of 1:43:04.

A total of 50,229 runners were registered to take part in the event. Amongst them, 49,828 runners finished the race, comprising 28,804 men and 21,024 women.

== Course ==
The 26.2-mile (42.2 km) course covers all five boroughs of New York City. It begins on Staten Island, in Fort Wadsworth, near the approach to the Verrazzano–Narrows Bridge. The bridge, which normally carries only vehicular traffic, is closed for the event. Runners use both sides of the upper level of the bridge and the westbound side of the lower level. In the opening minutes of the race, the bridge is filled with runners, creating a dramatic spectacle that is closely associated with the event.

After descending the bridge, the course winds through Brooklyn, mostly along Fourth Avenue and Bedford Avenue, for approximately the next 11 miles (18 km). Runners pass through a variety of neighborhoods, including: Bay Ridge, Sunset Park, Park Slope, Bedford-Stuyvesant, Williamsburg, and Greenpoint. At 13.1 miles (21.1 km), runners cross the Pulaski Bridge, marking the halfway point of the race and the entrance into Long Island City, Queens. After about 2.5 miles (4.0 km) in Queens, runners cross the East River via the Queensboro Bridge into Manhattan.

Reaching Manhattan after about 16 miles (26 km), the race proceeds north on First Avenue, then crosses briefly into The Bronx via the Willis Avenue Bridge for a mile before returning into Manhattan via the Madison Avenue Bridge. It then proceeds south through Harlem down Fifth Avenue and into Central Park. At the southern end of the park, the race proceeds across Central Park South, where thousands of spectators cheer runners on during the last mile. At Columbus Circle, the race re-enters the park and finishes outside Tavern on the Green.

== Race summary ==
The wheelchair division was scheduled to start at 8:30 a.m. EST, the women's division at 9:20 a.m., and the men's division at 9:50 a.m. The last wave of runners was scheduled to start at 11:00 a.m. The weather was generally overcast with negligible wind. The recorded temperature at the start of the race was 57 °F (14 °C), rising to 62 °F (17 °C) at the finishing line.

=== Women's division ===
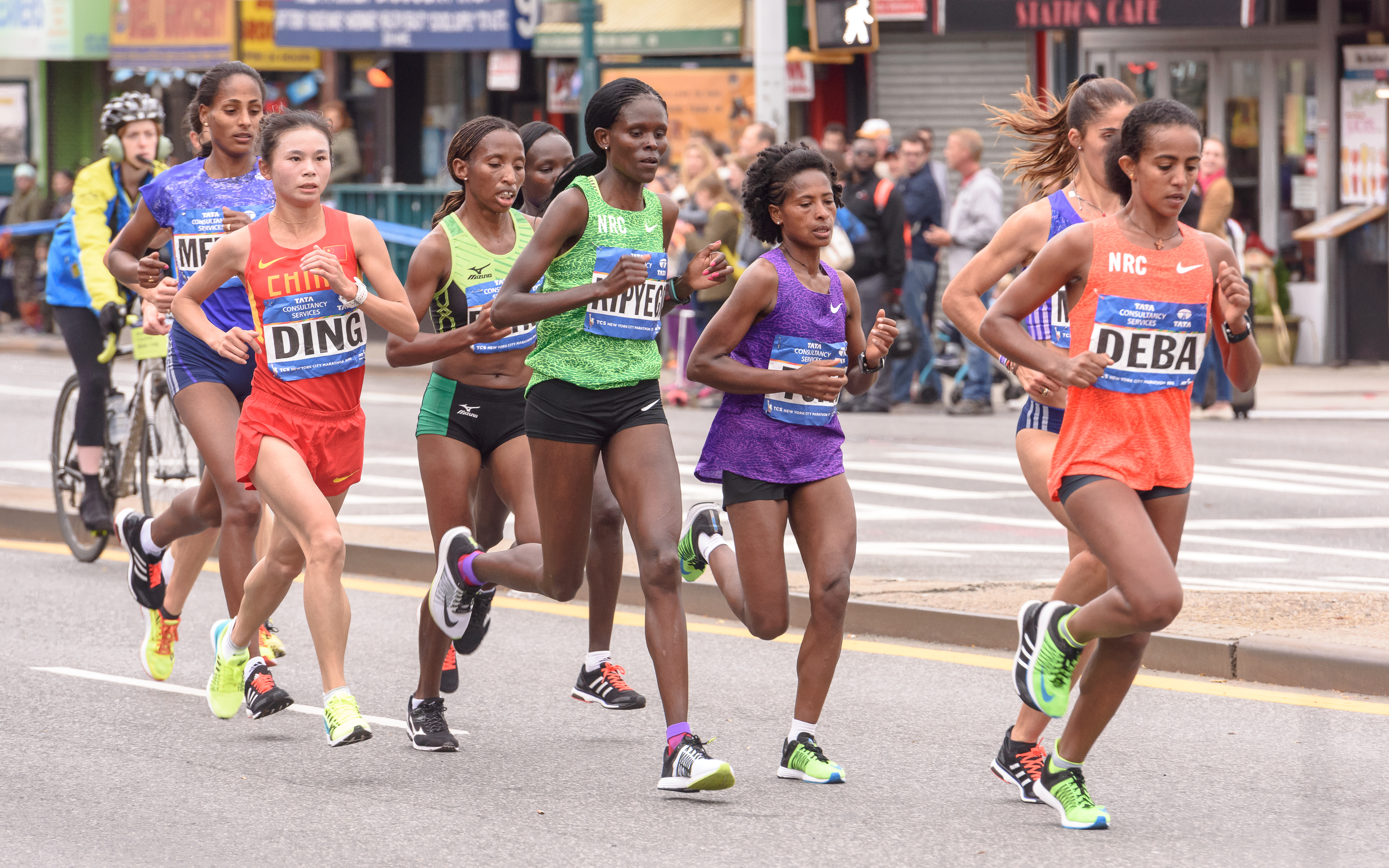
Lead pack on 4th Avenue, Brooklyn

The first runners hit the 3.1-mile (5 km) point in 17:21 and the 6.2-mile (10 km) mark in 34:27. By the halfway point (1:12:54), a nine-woman lead pack had emerged led by Portuguese runner Sara Moreira. They remained together until the 18-mile (29 km) mark, where a group containing Kenyans Mary Jepkosgei Keitany and Priscah Jeptoo, along with Ethiopians Aselefech Mergia and Tigist Tufa started to pull away. At the 20-mile (32 km) mark, Keitany increased her pace and began recording sub 5:20 miles. Tufa kept up with Keitany until the 22-mile (35 km) point before falling away. Keitany won the race in 2:24:25, a full minute and seven seconds in front of second placed Mergia who had overtaken Tufa in the final mile. Tufa trailed a further eighteen seconds behind in third place. Keitany's win marked the first time a woman had defended the New York Marathon title since Briton Paula Radcliffe in 2008.

Singer-songwriter Alicia Keys completed a charity run of the course in 5:50:52.

=== Men's division ===
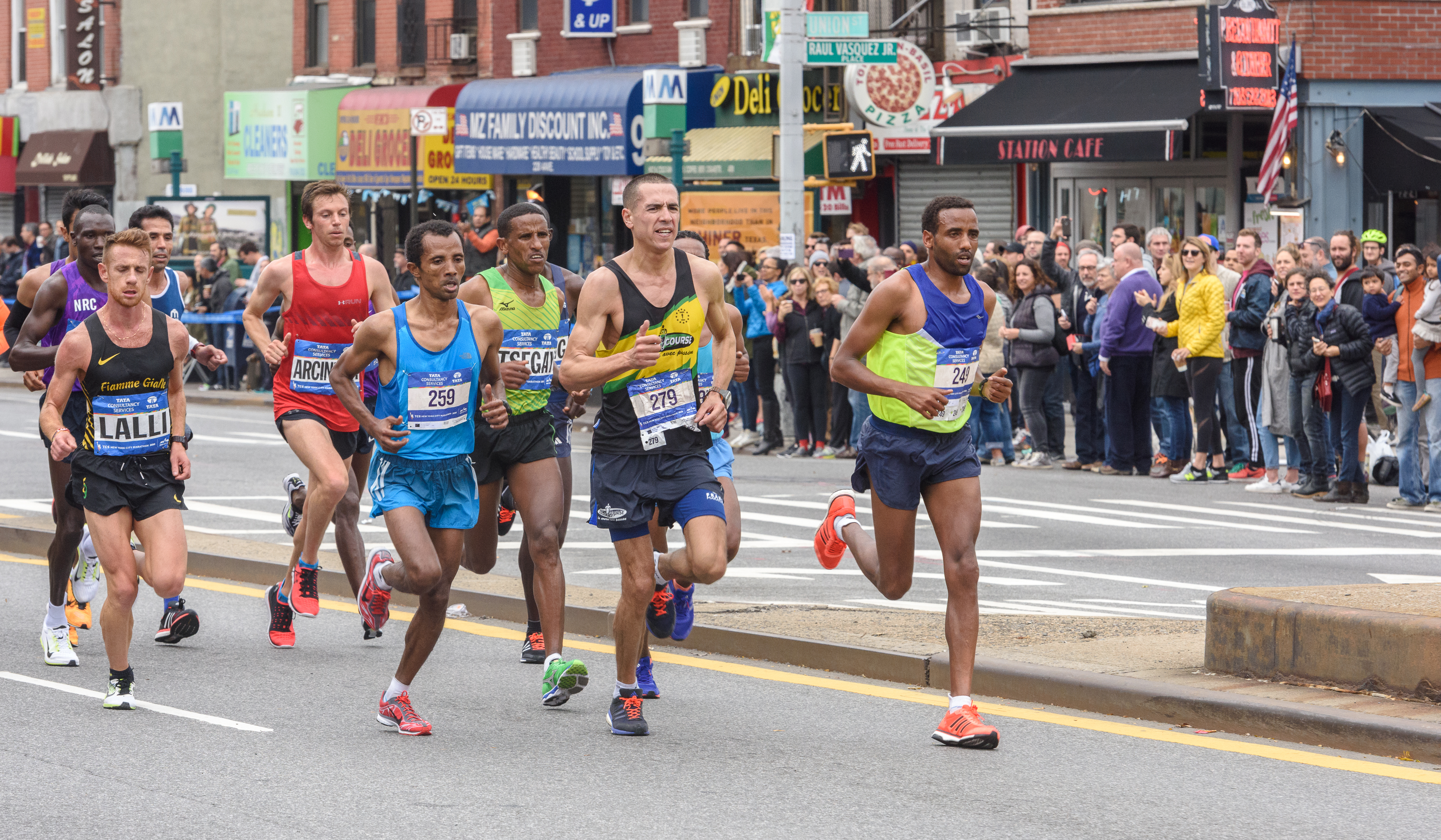
Lead pack on 4th Avenue, Brooklyn

The first runners hit the 3.1-mile (5 km) point in 15:47 and the 6.2-mile (10 km) mark in 31:30. By the halfway point (1:06:49), a thirteen-man lead pack had emerged led by Ethiopian Lelisa Desisa. At the 20-mile (32 km) mark, the lead pack had reduced to four, containing Kenyans Geoffrey Kamworor, Stanley Biwott and Wilson Kipsang Kiprotich, along with Desisa. Biwott took the lead in the 23-mile (37 km) and held on to win his first World Marathon Majors title in 2:10:34. Kamworor was fourteen seconds behind him to claim second and Desisa a further minute 22 seconds off in third.

Former professional tennis player James Blake finished the course in 3:51:19 and actor Ethan Hawke recorded a time of 4:25:30.

== Results ==
=== Men ===
Position	Athlete	Nationality	Time
1st place, gold medalist(s)	Stanley Biwott	Kenya	2:10:34
2nd place, silver medalist(s)	Geoffrey Kamworor	Kenya	2:10:48
3rd place, bronze medalist(s)	Lelisa Desisa	Ethiopia	2:12:10
4	Wilson Kipsang Kiprotich	Kenya	2:12:45
5	Yemane Tsegay	Ethiopia	2:13:24
6	Yuki Kawauchi	Japan	2:13:29
7	Meb Keflezighi	United States	2:13:32
8	Craig Leon	United States	2:15:16
9	Birhanu Dare	Ethiopia	2:15:40
10	Kevin Chelimo	Kenya	2:15:49
11	Andrea Lalli	Italy	2:17:12
12	Juan Luis Barrios	Mexico	2:18:06
13	Diriba Yigezu	Ethiopia	2:19:22
14	Abebe Negash	Ethiopia	2:20:30
15	Tim Chichester	United States	2:21:27
16	Nicholas Arciniaga	United States	2:22:07
17	Khalid En Guady	Morocco	2:23:13
18	Carmine Buccilli	Italy	2:23:48
19	Abu Diriba	Ethiopia	2:24:30
20	Kojo Kyereme	United Kingdom	2:26:17
—	Daniele Meucci	Italy	DNF
—	Li Zicheng	China	DNF
—	Harbert Okuti	Uganda	DNF
—	Gian-Paul Caccia	United States	DNF

=== Women ===
Position	Athlete	Nationality	Time
1st place, gold medalist(s)	Mary Jepkosgei Keitany	Kenya	2:24:25
2nd place, silver medalist(s)	Aselefech Mergia	Ethiopia	2:25:32
3rd place, bronze medalist(s)	Tigist Tufa	Ethiopia	2:25:50
4	Sara Moreira	Portugal	2:25:53
5	Christelle Daunay	France	2:26:57
6	Priscah Jeptoo	Kenya	2:27:03
7	Laura Thweatt	United States	2:28:23
8	Jeļena Prokopčuka	Latvia	2:28:46
9	Anna Incerti	Italy	2:33:13
10	Caroline Rotich	Kenya	2:33:19
11	Rocío Cántara†	Peru	2:37:05
12	Cassie Fien	Australia	2:38:53
13	Teresa McWalters	United States	2:40:37
14	Marisol Romero	Mexico	2:41:50
15	Beverly Ramos	Puerto Rico	2:41:56
16	Emma Nordling†	Sweden	2:43:29
17	Ding Changqin	China	2:44:02
18	Caroline Wöstmann	South Africa	2:44:26
19	Hilary Corno	United States	2:45:53
20	Roberta Groner†	United States	2:45:54
21	Liza Howard†	Canada	2:49:07
22	Mikaela Larson†	Sweden	2:49:12
23	Clare Geraghty	Australia	2:49:19
—	Bizunesh Deba	Ethiopia	DNF
—	Sally Kipyego	Kenya	DNF
—	Ana Dulce Félix	Portugal	DNF
—	Alana Hadley	United States	DNF
—	Jane Fardell	Australia	DNF

- † Ran in mass race

=== Wheelchair men ===
Position	Athlete	Nationality	Time
1st place, gold medalist(s)	Ernst van Dyk	South Africa	1:30:54
2nd place, silver medalist(s)	Josh George	United States	1:30:55
3rd place, bronze medalist(s)	Marcel Hug	Switzerland	1:34:05
4	Hiroyuki Yamamoto	Japan	1:35:19
5	Kurt Fearnley	Australia	1:35:21
6	Laurens Molina	Costa Rica	1:35:37
7	Jordi Madera Jimenez	Spain	1:35:38
8	Aaron Pike	United States	1:36:45
9	Brian Siemann	United States	1:36:59
10	James Senbeta	United States	1:44:27

=== Wheelchair women ===
Position	Athlete	Nationality	Time
1st place, gold medalist(s)	Tatyana McFadden	United States	1:43:04
2nd place, silver medalist(s)	Manuela Schär	Switzerland	1:44:57
3rd place, bronze medalist(s)	Sandra Graf	Switzerland	1:52:05
4	Christie Dawes	Australia	1:53:48
5	Susannah Scaroni	United States	1:54:24
6	Shelly Woods	United Kingdom	1:56:34
7	Amanda McGrory	United States	1:59:40
8	Diane Roy	Canada	2:00:13
9	Arielle Rausin	United States	2:04:41
10	Hannah Babalola	Nigeria	2:18:11

=== Handcycle men ===
Position	Athlete	Nationality	Time
1st place, gold medalist(s)	Alfredo Dellossantos	United States	1:13:16
2nd place, silver medalist(s)	Ludovic Narce	France	1:13:19
3rd place, bronze medalist(s)	Omar Duran	United States	1:25:44
4	Stephane Massard	France	1:27:41
5	Krzysztof Zybowski	United States	1:29:43

=== Handcycle women ===
Position	Athlete	Nationality	Time
1st place, gold medalist(s)	Helene Hines	United States	2:02:12
2nd place, silver medalist(s)	Ashli Molinero	United States	2:06:56
3rd place, bronze medalist(s)	Jessica Hayon	United States	3:02:41
4	Christine Markow	United States	3:05:36
5	Maria Bournias	United States	3:08:21
