= Chuncheon Marathon =

Annual marathon in South Korea

- Date: Late October
- Location: Chuncheon, South Korea
- Event type: Road
- Distance: Marathon
- Primary sponsor: The Chosun Ilbo
- Established: 1946
- Course records: Men's: 2:06:15 (2017) (Kenya) Luka Kanda; Women's: 2:26:12 (1997) (South Korea) Kwon Eun-ju
- Website: Chuncheon Marathon

The Chuncheon International Marathon (Korean: 춘천마라톤) is an annual marathon race which is held in late October in the city of Chuncheon, South Korea. First held in 1946, it is the second oldest marathon in the country after the Seoul International Marathon. Sponsored by The Chosun Ilbo, a major daily newspaper in South Korea, the race is one of two in the country which holds IAAF Silver Label status, along with Gyeongju International Marathon.

== History ==
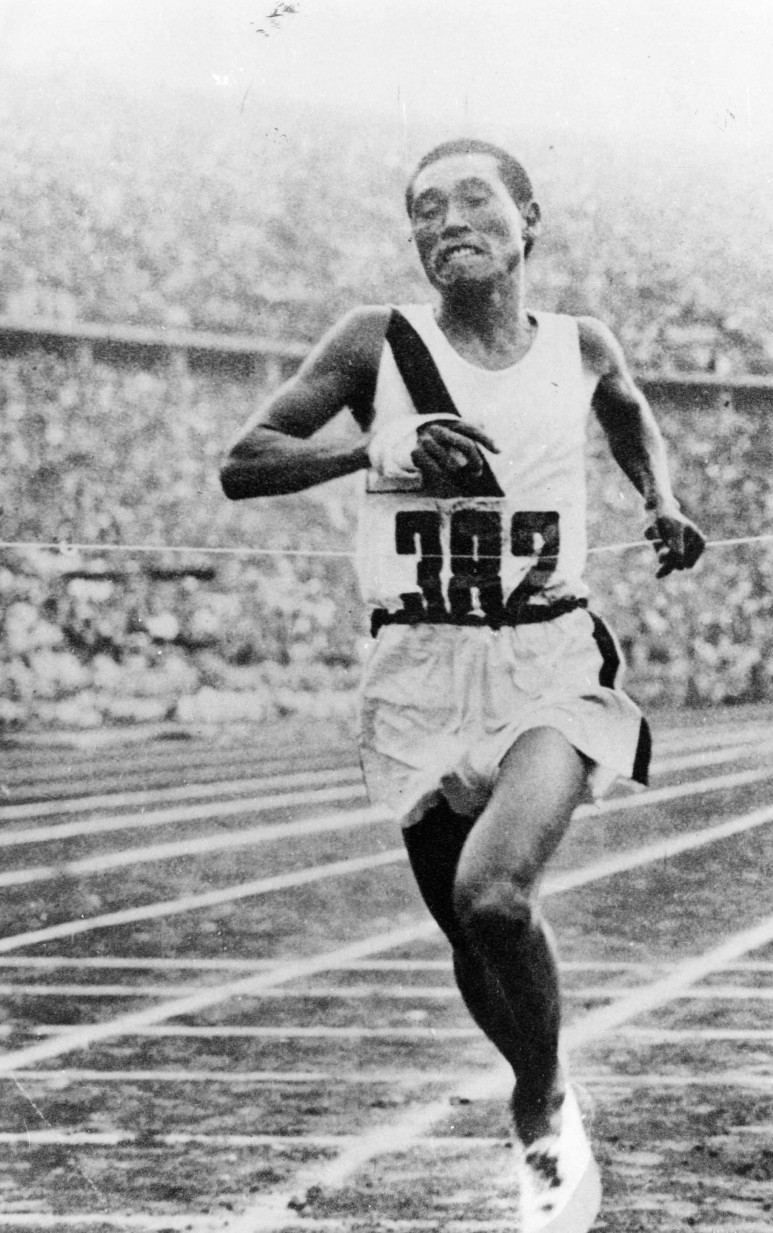
Sohn Kee-chung winning the 1936 Olympic marathon – one of the inspirations for the race.

The 1936 Summer Olympics saw two Koreans win Olympic medals: Sohn Kee-chung took the gold while Nam Sung-yong was the bronze medallist. Both runners had competed in the colours of Japan, as the competition took place when Korea was part of the Japanese empire. When Japan was defeated in World War II, Korea was liberated and the first "Chosun Ilbo Shortened Marathon" was held the following year, building upon the newly free country's running tradition. Suh Yun-bok, a sports coach at Anyang Technical College, won the first race and later took victory at the Boston Marathon. The race was extended to the marathon distance for the next year and the event was held on the eleventh anniversary of Sohn's Olympic win.

The race was not held from 1950 to 1953 due to the Korean War, but the annual competition has been uninterrupted since then. Marathon running became less popular in Korea in the 1960–70s and it was not until the 1980s that there was a resurgence of interest in the event, which saw women competing in the programme for the first time. Improving course times eventually resulted in Kim Wan-Ki's South Korean record run of 2:11:02 to win in 1991. The national race turned into an international one in 1995 and top runners from Kenya and Japan became frequent participants. The 1996 event hosted the Asian Marathon Championship race.

== Course and records ==
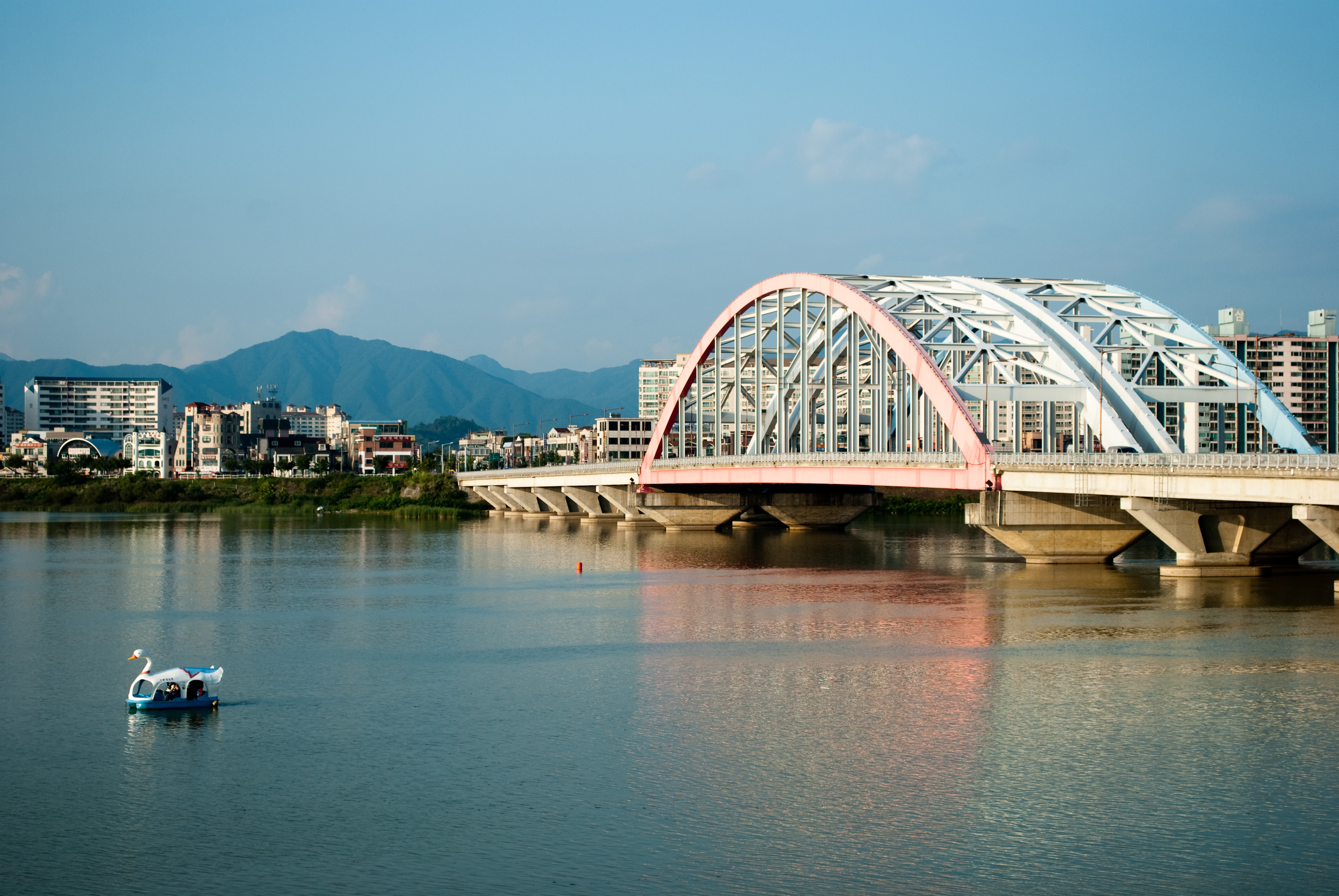
The runners cross rivers over the city's bridges.

The course overall is a relatively flat one, with small uphill and downhill sections coming around the 5-kilometre and 30-kilometre marks. The looped course starts near the city centre on the east bank and heads south, following the waterfront. It turns northwards at the 8 km mark as it reaches the city suburbs and traces along the west side of the river for a 20 km stretch. The course then crosses the river and heads back towards the finishing point in down-town Chuncheon.

Kim Wan-Ki's 1991 national and course record lasted only three years as Lee Bong-Ju dipped under the two hours, ten minutes mark with a run of 2:09:59. Moses Tanui became the first Kenyan winner in 1997 and knocked almost a minute off the record. This mark stood for thirteen years, at which point another Kenyan (Benjamin Kiptoo Kolum) took over a minute more off that time for the current men's course best of 2:07:54. That mark was beaten the following year by Stanley Biwott, who went 51 seconds faster. The women's record for the course is Kwon Eun-ju's long-standing time of 2:26:12, which is also a South Korean record.

== Past winners ==
=== National era ===
Not much is known of the early winners of the race. Suh Yun-bok won the first race in a time of 1:29:24 on a shortened course estimated to have been around 25 km in length. A university student, Hong Jong-Oh, won the second race, beating a field of 50 runners to complete Chuncheon's first true marathon in a time of 2:57:20. The next documented winner came from after the Korean War, as Lee Chang-Hoon won a shorter 20 km race in 1957. The next known winners after this come from the race's period of growth in the 1980s: Kim Won-Tak won in 1985 in around two hours seventeen minutes, while Kim Jae-Ryong took the 1987 race in a time around three minutes faster than that.

Key: Course record Short course

Edition	Year	Men's winner	Time (h:m:s)
1st	1946	Suh Yun-bok (KOR)	1:29:24
2nd	1947	Hong Jong-oh (KOR)	2:57:20
Race winners not known (1948–49)
Not held due to Korean War (1950–53)
Race winners not known(1953–1956)
8th	1957	Lee Chang-hoon (KOR)	?
Race winners not known (1958–1984)
36th	1985	Kim Won-tak (KOR)	2:17
37th	1986	Unknown	2:15
38th	1987	Kim Jae-ryong (KOR)	2:14
39th	1988	Unknown	2:13
Race winners not known (1989–90)
42nd	1991	Kim Wan-gi (KOR)	2:11:02 NR
43rd	1992	Chang Ki-shik (KOR)	2:11:24
44th	1993	Yoo Young-hoon (KOR)	2:13:03
45th	1994	Lee Bong-ju (KOR)	2:09:59

=== International era ===
Key: Course record Asian Marathon Championship race

Edition	Year	Men's winner	Time (h:m:s)	Women's winner	Time (h:m:s)
46th	1995	Rolando Vera (ECU)	2:11:30	Gang Sun-deok (KOR)	2:35:37
47th	1996	Norihiro Otoshi (JPN)	2:14:02	Yukari Komatsu (JPN)	2:37:54
48th	1997	Moses Tanui (KEN)	2:09:01	Kwon Eun-ju (KOR)	2:26:12
49th	1998	Oh Sung-keun (KOR)	2:18:21	Oh Jung-hee (KOR)	2:38:03
50th	1999	Je In-mo (KOR)	2:14:52	Yun Sun-suk (KOR)	2:35:31
51st	2000	Kim Je-kyong (KOR)	2:13:57	Yun Sun-suk (KOR)	2:37:02
52nd	2001	Ji Young-jun (KOR)	2:15:32	Kwon Eun-ju (KOR)	2:31:33
53rd	2002	Je In-mo (KOR)	2:16:49	Yun Sun-suk (KOR)	2:34:05
54th	2003	Elijah Mutai (KEN)	2:13:54	Yun Sun-suk (KOR)	2:34:27
55th	2004	Elijah Mutai (KEN)	2:14:31	Oh Jung-hee (KOR)	2:35:59
56th	2005	Elijah Mutai (KEN)	2:09:27	Yun Sun-suk (KOR)	2:37:25
57th	2006	Elijah Mutai (KEN)	2:13:46	Yun Sun-suk (KOR)	2:36:04
58th	2007	Victor Mangusho (KEN)	2:14:01	Choi Gyeong-hui (KOR)	2:35:25
59th	2008	Michael Njuroge (KEN)	2:19:01	Choi Gyeong-hui (KOR)	2:44:35
60th	2009	Mulugeta Wami (ETH)	2:09:50	Kim Seon-jeong (KOR)	2:49:35
61st	2010	Benjamin Kiptoo (KEN)	2:07:54	Kim Seon-jeong (KOR)	2:43:39
62nd	2011	Stanley Biwott (KEN)	2:07:03	Oh Jung-hee (KOR)	2:41:23
63rd	2012	David Kemboi (KEN)	2:10:05	Park Yu-jin (KOR)	2:41:55
64th	2013	Nickson Kurgat (KEN)	2:08:29	Park Yu-jin (KOR)	2:41:30
65th	2014	Nickson Kurgat (KEN)	2:07:11	Yeom Ko-eun (KOR)	2:43:33
66th	2015	Adugna Takele (ETH)	2:09:40	Lee Yeon-jin (KOR)	2:41:53
67th	2016	Luka Kanda (KEN)	2:07:21	Kim Ji-eun (KOR)	2:34:39
68th	2017	Luka Kanda (KEN)	2:06:15	Lee Yeon-jin (KOR)	2:40:02
69th	2018	Shifera Tamru (ETH)	2:08:50	Kim Sun-ae (KOR)	2:40:23
70th	2019	Lee Dong-jin (KOR)	2:20:08	Kim Su-jin (KOR)	2:38:31
—	2020	Not held due to COVID-19 pandemic			
—	2021	Not held due to COVID-19 pandemic			
71st	2022	Park Min-ho (KOR)	2:13:16	Kim Sun-ae (KOR)	2:50:20
72nd	2023	Kim Se-jong (KOR)	2:16:28	Choi Jung-yoon (KOR)	2:33:58
73rd	2024	Kim Hong-rok (KOR)	2:20:36	Jung Da-eun (KOR)	2:40:13
74th	2025	Jeon Su-hwan (KOR)	2:22:39	Jung Da-eun (KOR)	2:36:46
