= Benjamin Kiptoo =

Kenyan marathon runner

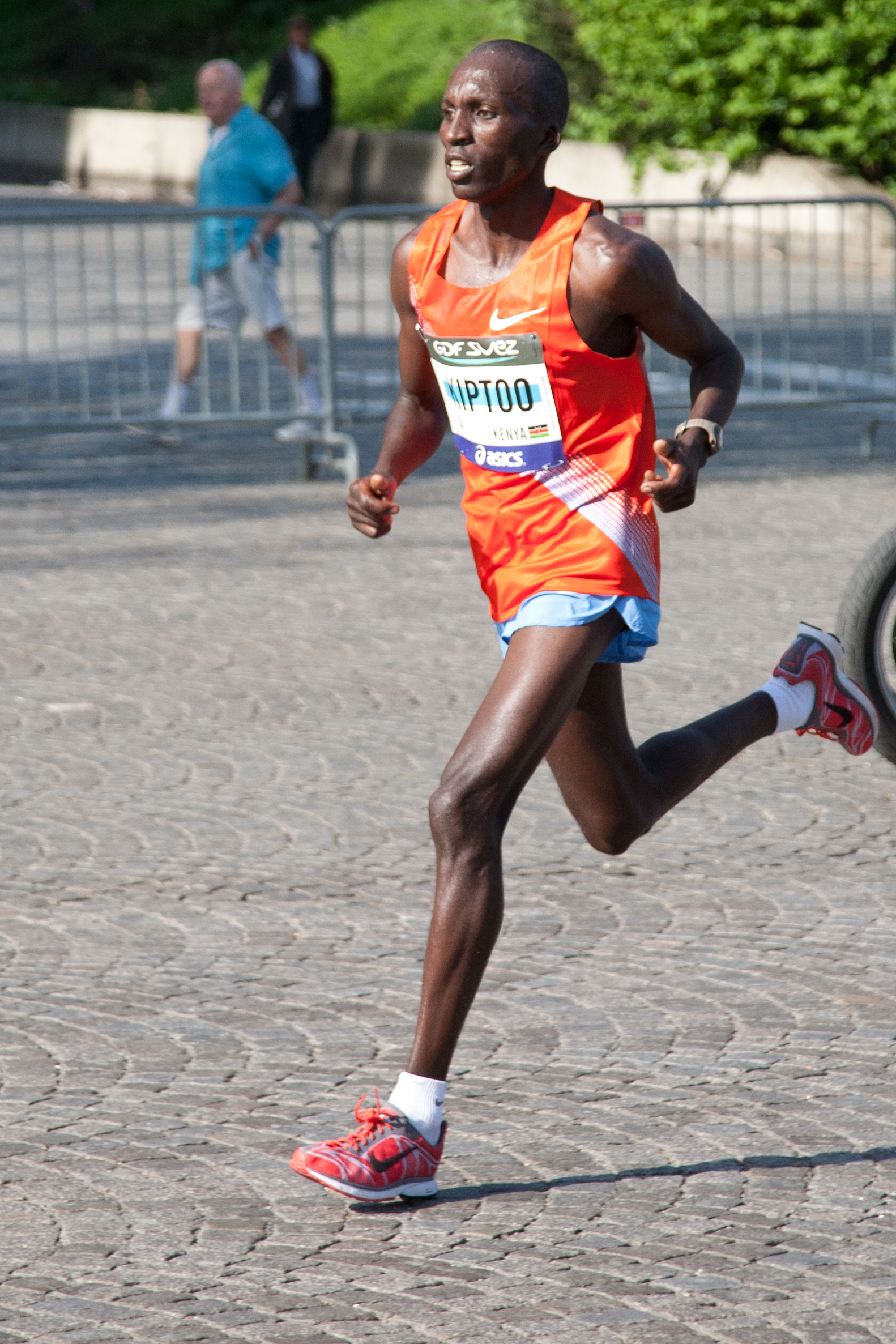
Benjamin Kiptoo en route to his victory at the 2011 Paris Marathon

Benjamin Kolum Kiptoo (born 1979) is a Kenyan professional marathon runner. He has won marathons in Rome, Beijing and Chuncheon, and represented Kenya at the 2009 World Championships in Athletics. He holds a personal best of 2:06:31 for the distance, set en route to victory at the 2011 Paris Marathon. He also holds the fastest ever time recorded on Italian soil (2:07:17), with which he won the 2009 Rome City Marathon.

== Career ==
Born in Kapsabet, Kenya, he was introduced to elite coach Claudio Berardelli by a friend and became part of the same training group as Martin Lel. He started his career as a pacemaker for road races and it was in the process of these duties that he completed his first marathon – he paced athletes at the 2006 Florence Marathon, where he was seventh with a time of 2:16:08 for the distance. The following year he was fourth at the Brescia Marathon and then improved his best to 2:12:24 to take second place at the Lausanne Marathon. A return to the Brescia race in 2008 proved to be a pivotal point for his career as he topped the podium for the first time. Completing the race seven seconds outside of the course record, he sliced over three minutes off his previous best to win the race in 2:09:23. More success followed at the Beijing Marathon in October as a front-running performance brought him his second win of the year.

His strong form continued into 2009 as he took his third consecutive win over the distance at the Rome Marathon in March. His winning time of 2:07:17 was not just a significant personal best and course record – it was the fastest marathon time ever to be recorded in Italy. He was selected for the Kenyan team at the 2009 World Championships in Athletics, representing his country internationally for the first time in the men's marathon. However, he was soon left behind by the leading pack and dropped out of the race before the 30 km mark while his teammates went on to secure the Marathon World Cup. His third race of the year was the Frankfurt Marathon and he finished in a relatively quick time of 2:10:07, although this was only enough for seventh place as the winner Gilbert Kirwa entered the all-time top twenty runners.

He participated in the 2010 Paris Marathon and led the pack at the 35 km mark, eventually taking fourth place in 2:08:01 – the second fastest run of his career at that time. The Chuncheon Marathon was his next challenge that year and he broke Moses Tanui's thirteen-year-old course record by over a minute to clinch victory over Deriba Merga and Benson Barus. He made a step up in his career at his following race, as he won the 2011 Paris Marathon with a new best of 2:06:31 hours – the fourth fastest recorded on the elite course. His next race came at the Honolulu Marathon, but he managed only fifth place in a relatively slow time of 2:19:21 hours. He was 23rd at the 2012 Paris race but a third place at the JoongAng Seoul Marathon in a time of 2:10:35 marked a revival in form.
