= Ágúst Ásgeirsson =

Icelandic middle-distance runner

Personal information
- Nationality: Icelandic
- Born: 15 July 1952 (age 74)

Sport
- Sport: Middle-distance running
- Event: 1500 metres

Ágúst Ásgeirsson (born 15 July 1952) is an Icelandic middle-distance runner. He competed in the men's 1500 metres at the 1976 Summer Olympics.
