= Anelio Bocci =

Italian long-distance runner

Personal information
- Nationality: Italian
- Born: 7 August 1953 (age 72) Sarnano, Italy

Sport
- Country: Italy
- Sport: Athletics
- Event: Marathon

Achievements and titles
- Personal best: Marathon: 2:12:11 (1981)

Anelio Bocci (Sarnano 7 August 1953) is a retired male long-distance runner from Italy.

He finished second in the 1981 edition of the Tokyo International Marathon, clocking a total time of 2:12:11, he has 4 caps in the national team from 1976 to 1981.
