= 1979 NCAA Division I cross country championships =

1979 cross-country running meet of the NCAA (Division I)

1979 NCAA Division I Men's Cross Country Championships
- Organisers: NCAA
- Edition: 41st
- Date: November 19, 1979
- Host city: Bethlehem, PA; Lehigh University
- Venue: Saucon Valley Fields
- Distances: 10 km (6.21 mi)
- Participation: 237 athletes

The 1979 NCAA Division I Men's Cross Country Championships were the 41st annual cross country meet to determine the team and individual national champions of NCAA Division I men's collegiate cross country running in the United States. Held on November 19, 1979, the meet was hosted by Lehigh University at the Saucon Valley Fields in Bethlehem, Pennsylvania. The distance for this race was 10 kilometers (6.21 miles).

All Division I cross country teams were eligible to qualify for the meet through their placement at various regional qualifying meets. In total, 29 teams and 237 individual runners contested this championship.

The team national championship was retained by the UTEP Miners, their fifth title. The individual championship was won by Henry Rono, from Washington State, with a time of 28:19.60. This was Rono's third individual title in four years. Along with Gerry Lindgren (1966, 1967, and 1969) and Steve Prefontaine (1970, 1971, and 1973), the former from Washington State and the latter from Oregon, Rono is one of only three Division I collegiate runners with three individual titles.

== Men's title ==
- Distance: 10,000 meters (6.21 miles)

=== Team Result (Top 10) ===
Rank	Team	Points
1st place, gold medalist(s)	UTEP	86
2nd place, silver medalist(s)	Oregon	93
3rd place, bronze medalist(s)	Penn State	186
4	Colorado	189
5	East Tennessee State	224
6	Auburn	230
7	Villanova	245
8	Indiana	265
9	Washington State	277
10	Arkansas	291

=== Individual Result (Top 10) ===
Rank	Name	Nationality	Time
1st place, gold medalist(s)	(Kenya) Henry Rono	Washington State	28:19.60
2nd place, silver medalist(s)	(United States) Alberto Salazar	Oregon	28:37.40
3rd place, bronze medalist(s)	(Kenya) Kipsubai Koskei	New Mexico	28:47.30
4	(Kenya) James Rotich	UTEP	29:03.60
5	(United States) Thom Hunt	Arizona	29:08.20
6	(Kenya) Michael Musyoki	UTEP	29:14.40
7	(South Africa) (United States) Sydney Maree	Villanova	29:15.20
8	(Kenya) Joel Cheruyiot	Washington State	29:20.90
9	(United States) Jon Sinclair	Colorado State	29:27.90
10	(United States) Rudy Chapa	Oregon	29:28.20

== See also ==
- NCAA Men's Division II Cross Country Championship
- NCAA Men's Division III Cross Country Championship
