= Choi Kyong-hee =

South Korean long-distance runner

Personal information
- Nationality: South Korean
- Born: 13 September 1981 (age 44)

Sport
- Sport: Long-distance running
- Event: Marathon

Choi Kyong-hee (born 13 September 1981) is a South Korean long-distance runner. She competed in the women's marathon event at the 2004 Summer Olympics.
