= Yevgeniy Okorokov =

Ukrainian long-distance runner

- Eugene Okorokov in 2006

Personal information
- Born: April 6, 1959 Tomsk, Soviet Union
- Died: January 4, 2022 (aged 62) Tomsk, Russia

Sport
- Sport: Long-distance running

Yevgeniy Okorokov (also: Eugene Okorokov; Russian: Евгений Окороков; April 6, 1959, in Tomsk, Soviet Union – January 4, 2022, in Tomsk, Russia) was a male former long-distance runner from Russian Federation, who represented the Soviet Union during his career. He won the 1991 edition of the Reims Marathon, clocking a total time of 2:13:22 on October 20, 1991.

== Achievements ==
Year	Competition	Venue	Position	Event	Notes
Representing Soviet Union
1982	World Cross Country Championships	Rome, Italy	3rd	Team Cross	
1991	Reims Marathon	Reims, France	1st	Marathon	2:13:22
