= Michelangelo Arena =

Italian long-distance runner (born 1953)

Personal information
- Nationality: Italian
- Born: 2 September 1953 (age 72)

Sport
- Country: Italy
- Sport: Athletics
- Event: Long-distance running

Achievements and titles
- Personal best: Marathon: 2:14:43 (1979)

Michelangelo Arena (born 2 September 1953) is a former Italian male long-distance runner who competed at one edition of the IAAF World Cross Country Championships at senior level (1978), He won two national championships at senior level.
