= Michele Cinà =

Italian long-distance runner

Personal information
- Nationality: Italian
- Born: 19 September 1956 (age 69)

Sport
- Country: Italy
- Sport: Athletics
- Event: Long-distance running

Achievements and titles
- Personal best: 15000 m: 13:54.5 (1980)
Medal record
Representing Italy
Summer Universiade
Bronze medal – third place	1979 Mexico City	3000m steeplechase

Michele Cinà (born 19 September 1956) is a former Italian male long-distance runner who competed at three edition of the IAAF World Cross Country Championships at senior level (1978, 1980, 1983),
