= 1971 International Cross Country Championships =

- Organisers: ICCU
- Edition: 58th
- Date: 20 March
- Host city: San Sebastián, Euskadi, Spain
- Venue: Lasarte Hippodrome
- Events: 3
- Distances: 7.5 mi (12.1 km) men 4.35 mi (7.0 km) junior men 2.17 mi (3.5 km) women
- Participation: 228 athletes from 18 nations

The 1971 International Cross Country Championships was held in San Sebastián, Spain, at the Lasarte Hippodrome on 20 March 1971. A report on the event was given in the Glasgow Herald.

Complete results for men, junior men, women, medallists, and the results of British athletes were published.

== Medallists ==
Event	Gold		Silver		Bronze	
Individual
Men; 7.5 mi (12.1 km)	Dave Bedford; England	38:42.8	Trevor Wright; England	39:05.2	Eddie Gray; New Zealand	39:11.6
Junior Men; 4.35 mi (7.0 km)	Nick Rose; England	23:12.4	Ray Smedley; England	23:17.4	Jim Brown; Scotland	24:02
Women; 2.17 mi (3.5 km)	Doris Brown; United States	11:08.4	Berny Lenferink; Netherlands	11:21.2	Joyce Smith; England	11:23.2
Team
Men	England	56	Belgium	176	France	186
Junior Men	England	7	Scotland	30	Italy	39
Women	England	29	New Zealand	42	United States	51

== Individual Race Results ==
=== Men's (7.5 mi / 12.1 km) ===
Rank	Athlete	Nationality	Time
1st place, gold medalist(s)	Dave Bedford	England	38:42.8
2nd place, silver medalist(s)	Trevor Wright	England	39:05.2
3rd place, bronze medalist(s)	Eddie Gray	New Zealand	39:11.6
4	Javier Álvarez	Spain	39:15.3
5	Peter Standing	England	39:19.4
6	Malcolm Thomas	Wales	39:22.8
7	Noel Tijou	France	39:29.3
8	Mariano Haro	Spain	39:38.5
9	Ian Stewart	Scotland	39:41.2
10	Rod Dixon	New Zealand	39:43.5
11	Pekka Päivärinta	Finland	39:44.7
12	Gaston Roelants	Belgium	39:45.3
13	Lucien Rault	France	39:50.2
14	René Goris	Belgium	39:54.1
15	Tony Simmons	England	39:55.2
16	Frank Briscoe	England	39:56.3
17	Andy Holden	England	39:57.2
18	Mike Beevor	England	39:58.3
19	Jan Wawrzuta	Poland	40:01.5
20	Tony Ashton	Wales	40:02.3
21	Lahcen El Hachmi	Morocco	40:04.3
22	Willy Polleunis	Belgium	40:05.2
23	Karel Lismont	Belgium	40:07.1
24	Dick Wedlock	Scotland	40:08.9
25	Norman Morrison	Scotland	40:09.2
26	Bryan Rose	New Zealand	40:11.3
27	Moha Aït Bassou	Morocco	40:14.7
28	John Caine	England	40:17.1
29	Alan Blinston	England	40:18.6
30	Reino Ahvenainen	Finland	40:21.5
31	Juan Hidalgo	Spain	40:23.1
32	Miloud Chenna	Morocco	40:25.3
33	Antoine Borowski	France	40:29.7
34	Michel Bernard	France	40:32.3
35	Jean-Yves Le Flohic	France	40:37.9
36	Haddou Jaddour	Morocco	40:40.2
37	Rex Maddaford	New Zealand	40:41.3
38	Jim Alder	Scotland	40:49.7
39	Seppo Nikkari	Finland	40:50.1
40	Paddy Coyle	Ireland	40:51.5
41	Rauno Mattila	Finland	40:52
42	Bernie Hayward	Wales	40:53
43	Seppo Tuominen	Finland	40:55
44	Julio Gude	Spain	40:59
45	Józef Rębacz	Poland	40:59
46	Edward Stawiarz	Poland	40:59
47	Brunello Bertolin	Italy	40:59
48	Hans Menet	Switzerland	40:59
49	Ben Assou El Ghazi	Morocco	40:59
50	Moumoh Haddou	Morocco	40:59
51	Eddy van Butsele	Belgium	40:59
52	Sean O'Sullivan	Ireland	41:01
53	Pat Gilseman	Ireland	41:02
54	Paul Thijs	Belgium	41:03
55	Ramon Tasende	Spain	41:04
56	Fernando Aguilar	Spain	41:05
57	Mohamed Ben Abdelsalem	Morocco	41:10
58	John Sheddan	New Zealand	41:14
59	Alistair Blamire	Scotland	41:15
60	Martin Simmons	New Zealand	41:17
61	Lachie Stewart	Scotland	41:24
62	Gaston Heleven	Belgium	41:26
63	Mohamed Belhoucine	Morocco	41:27
64	Jean-Pierre Dufresne	France	41:28
65	Esko Lipsonen	Finland	41:29
66	Achille Vaes	Belgium	41:30
67	Stanisław Podzoba	Poland	41:31
68	Dick Crowley	Ireland	41:35
69	Carlos Pérez	Spain	41:35
70	Andrew McKean	Scotland	41:38
71	Bernie Plain	Wales	41:39
72	Geoffrey Pyne	New Zealand	41:40
73	Mario Binato	Italy	41:41
74	Steve Gibbons	Wales	41:42
75	Olavi Suomalainen	Finland	41:45
76	Albrecht Moser	Switzerland	41:46
77	Mohamed Kacemi	Algeria	41:49
78	Gérard Vervoort	France	41:52
79	Alfons Sidler	Switzerland	41:54
80	Nigel Evans	Wales	41:56
81	Hidih Bidrou	Morocco	42:03
82	Cherif Ben Ali	Algeria	42:04
83	Tony Brien	Ireland	42:05
84	Guy Texereau	France	42:06
85	Josef Wirth	Switzerland	42:07
86	Josef Fähndrich	Switzerland	42:08
87	Mohamed Gouasmi	Algeria	42:13
88	Raymond Corbaz	Switzerland	42:15
89	Tahar Bounab	Algeria	42:18
90	Irineo de Lucas	Spain	42:19
91	Karl Mangold	Switzerland	42:22
92	Edward Mleczko	Poland	42:23
93	Bolesław Walkowiak	Poland	42:24
94	Kazimierz Podolak	Poland	42:25
95	Renato Martini	Italy	42:32
96	Jim McNamara	Ireland	42:40
97	Mike Teer	Northern Ireland	42:43
98	Gaetano Pusterla	Italy	42:45
99	Ron McAndrew	Wales	42:47
100	Jean Levaillant	France	42:48
101	Roy Kernoghan	Northern Ireland	42:58
102	Desmond McGann	Ireland	43:09
103	Giuseppe Cindolo	Italy	43:10
104	Ian Morrison	Northern Ireland	43:11
105	Massimo Begnis	Italy	43:15
106	Jim Hayes	Northern Ireland	43:22
107	Roberto Gervasini	Italy	43:27
108	Eddie Spillane	Ireland	43:29
109	Guenaoui Behloul	Algeria	43:30
110	Antonio Frechilla	Spain	43:31
111	Cyril Pennington	Northern Ireland	43:45
112	Franco Ambrosioni	Italy	43:52
113	Yahia Megdout	Algeria	43:54
114	Abdelkader Beneyttou	Algeria	43:55
115	Bill Mullett	Scotland	44:19
116	Fergus Murray	Scotland	44:29
117	Les Jones	Northern Ireland	45:06
118	Derradji Abdelatif	Algeria	45:25
119	John Nodwell	Northern Ireland	45:35
—	Mikko Ala-Leppilamppi	Finland	DNF
—	Emiel Puttemans	Belgium	DNF
—	Gavin Thorley	New Zealand	DNF

=== Junior Men's (4.35 mi / 7.0 km) ===
Rank	Athlete	Nationality	Time
1st place, gold medalist(s)	Nick Rose	England	23:12.4
2nd place, silver medalist(s)	Ray Smedley	England	23:17.4
3rd place, bronze medalist(s)	Jim Brown	Scotland	24:02
4	Steve Kenyon	England	24:16.2
5	Kamel Guemar	Algeria	24:30.4
6	Franco Fava	Italy	24:33.6
7	Ramon Sanchez	Spain	24:35.5
8	Aldo Tomasini	Italy	24:40
9	Peter Adams	England	24:42
10	Eddy Van Mullem	Belgium	24:44.4
11	Eric De Beck	Belgium	24:45.8
12	Ricardo Ortega	Spain	24:46.6
13	Ian Gilmour	Scotland	24:49
14	Ron MacDonald	Scotland	24:51.2
15	Alain Grandfils	France	24:52.2
16	Greg Hannon	Northern Ireland	24:53.4
17	Eddie Leddy	Ireland	24:55.6
18	Eamonn Coghlan	Ireland	24:58
19	Gerry Hannon	Northern Ireland	25:01
20	William Burns	Scotland	25:02.4
21	Herman Mignon	Belgium	25:06.8
22	Gérard Thomazo	France	25:08.6
23	Fernando Mamede	Portugal	25:14.4
24	Neil Cusack	Ireland	25:16.1
25	Vincenzo Lavini	Italy	25:17.4
26	John Baillie	Northern Ireland	25:18
27	William Curtin	Ireland	25:20.3
28	Attallah Djelloul	Algeria	25:22.8
29	Vasco Pereira	Portugal	25:23.5
30	Robert Harrison	England	25:24.6
31	Claude Biteau	France	25:25.2
32	Léon Schots	Belgium	25:27.3
33	Enrique Chaves	Spain	25:28.1
34	Frank Clement	Scotland	25:34.8
35	Paolo Picca	Italy	25:35
36	Carlos Cabral	Portugal	25:38.3
37	Mario Gilardi	Italy	25:48.2
38	Jean-Luc Simonin	France	25:57.4
39	Mohamed Salem	Algeria	26:04.1
40	Padraig Keane	Ireland	26:08.5
41	Pierre Chupin	France	26:13
42	Maurits Beutels	Belgium	26:16
43	Francisco Muñoz	Spain	26:29
44	Francisco Morera	Spain	26:40
45	Carlos Tavares	Portugal	26:48
46	John McLaughlin	Northern Ireland	26:53

=== Women's (2.8 mi / 4.5 km) ===
Rank	Athlete	Nationality	Time
1st place, gold medalist(s)	Doris Brown	United States	11:08.4
2nd place, silver medalist(s)	Berny Lenferink	Netherlands	11:21.2
3rd place, bronze medalist(s)	Joyce Smith	England	11:23.2
4	Angela Lovell	England	11:24.4
5	Janet Bristol	United States	11:25.2
6	Christine Haskett	Scotland	11:26.6
7	Valerie Robinson	New Zealand	11:27.4
8	Bev Shingles	New Zealand	11:28.2
9	Irene Miller	New Zealand	11:30
10	Rita Ridley	England	11:34.2
11	Beth Bonner	United States	11:35.4
12	Sheila Carey	England	11:36.6
13	Zina Boniolo	Italy	11:37.8
14	Thelwyn Bateman	Wales	11:43.8
15	Belen Azpeitia	Spain	11:47.6
16	Jean Lochhead	Wales	11:48.4
17	Annie van den Kerkhof	Netherlands	11:50
18	Heather Thomson	New Zealand	11:52.2
19	Ann O'Brien	Ireland	11:53.2
20	Bronwen Cardy	Wales	11:55.5
21	Waltraud Egger	Italy	11:56.6
22	Anneke Stalman	Netherlands	11:59
23	Margherita Gargano	Italy	12:00
24	Carol Gould	England	12:01.2
25	Deirdre Foreman	Ireland	12:02.2
26	Christina van Loock	Belgium	12:04.4
27	Gillian Tivey	England	12:05.6
28	Margaret MacSherry	Scotland	12:06.4
29	Millie Sampson	New Zealand	12:07.6
30	Joke van de Stelt	Netherlands	12:08.3
31	Hadhoum Kadiri	Morocco	12:09.1
32	Mary Lynch	Ireland	12:09.8
33	Els Gommers	Netherlands	12:10.3
34	Trina Hosmer	United States	12:11.5
35	Kate Moroney	Ireland	12:12.3
36	Eileen Cornish	United States	12:15.3
37	Beatrice Lambert	Ireland	12:17.4
38	Khaddouj Hanine	Morocco	12:18.5
39	Veronica Sherry	Ireland	12:20.2
40	Gloria Dourass	Wales	12:21.8
41	Giuseppina Torello	Italy	12:25.8
42	Pilar San Martin	Spain	12:26
43	Sandra Sutherland	Scotland	12:27
44	Pamela Bagian	United States	12:28
45	Begona Zuñiga	Spain	12:32
46	Anne Smith	New Zealand	12:33
47	Ann Barrass	Scotland	12:38
48	Brenda Grinney	Scotland	12:39
49	Liève van den Broeck	Belgium	12:42
50	Donata Govoni	Italy	12:43
51	Delyth Davies	Wales	12:43
52	Rose Murphy	Scotland	12:44
53	Luisa Marci	Italy	12:46
54	Maria Fuentes	Spain	12:47
55	Josee van Santberghe	Belgium	12:49
56	María Martínez	Spain	12:52
57	Consuelo Alonso	Spain	12:55
58	Rita Brownlie	Wales	13:05
59	Rabea Rodchi	Morocco	13:08
60	Monique Dockx	Belgium	13:10

== Team Results ==
=== Men's ===
Rank	Country	Team	Points
1	England	Dave Bedford; Trevor Wright; Peter Standing; Tony Simmons; Frank Briscoe; Andy Holden	56
2	Belgium	Gaston Roelants; René Goris; Willy Polleunis; Karel Lismont; Eddy van Butsele; Paul Thijs	176
3	France	Noel Tijou; Lucien Rault; Antoine Borowski; Michel Bernard; Jean-Yves Le Flohic; Jean-Pierre Dufresne	186
4	New Zealand	Eddie Gray; Rod Dixon; Bryan Rose; Rex Maddaford; John Sheddan; Martin Simmons	194
5	Spain	Javier Álvarez; Mariano Haro; Juan Hidalgo; Julio Gude; Ramon Tasende; Fernando Aguilar	198
6	Morocco	Lahcen El Hachmi; Moha Aït Bassou; Miloud Chenna; Haddou Jaddour; Ben Assou El Ghazi; Moumoh Haddou	215
7	Scotland	Ian Stewart; Dick Wedlock; Norman Morrison; Jim Alder; Alistair Blamire; Lachie Stewart	216
8	Finland	Pekka Päivärinta; Reino Ahvenainen; Seppo Nikkari; Rauno Mattila; Seppo Tuominen; Esko Lipsonen	229
9	Wales	Malcolm Thomas; Tony Ashton; Bernie Hayward; Bernie Plain; Steve Gibbons; Nigel Evans	293
10	Poland	Jan Wawrzuta; Józef Rębacz; Edward Stawiarz; Stanisław Podzoba; Edward Mleczko; Bolesław Walkowiak	362
11	Ireland	Paddy Coyle; Sean O'Sullivan; Pat Gilseman; Dick Crowley; Tony Brien; Jim McNamara	392
12	Switzerland	Hans Menet; Albrecht Moser; Alfons Sidler; Josef Wirth; Josef Fähndrich; Raymond Corbaz	462
13	Italy	Brunello Bertolin; Mario Binato; Renato Martini; Gaetano Pusterla; Giuseppe Cindolo; Massimo Begnis	521
14	Algeria	Mohamed Kacemi; Cherif Ben Ali; Mohamed Gouasmi; Tahar Bounab; Guenaoui Behloul; Yahia Megdout	557
15	Northern Ireland	Mike Teer; Roy Kernoghan; Ian Morrison; Jim Hayes; Cyril Pennington; Les Jones	636

=== Junior Men's ===
Rank	Country	Team	Points
1	England	Nick Rose; Ray Smedley; Steve Kenyon	7
2	Scotland	Jim Brown; Ian Gilmour; Ron MacDonald	30
3	Italy	Franco Fava; Aldo Tomasini; Vincenzo Lavini	39
4	Belgium	Eddy Van Mullem; Eric De Beck; Herman Mignon	42
5	Spain	Ramon Sanchez; Ricardo Ortega; Enrique Chaves	52
6	Ireland	Eddie Leddy; Eamonn Coghlan; Neil Cusack	59
7	Northern Ireland	Greg Hannon; Gerry Hannon; John Baillie	61
8	France	Alain Grandfils; Gérard Thomazo; Claude Biteau	68
9	Algeria	Kamel Guemar; Attallah Djelloul; Mohamed Salem	72
10	Portugal	Fernando Mamede; Vasco Pereira; Carlos Cabral	88

=== Women's ===
Rank	Country	Team	Points
1	England	Joyce Smith; Angela Lovell; Rita Ridley; Sheila Carey	29
2	New Zealand	Valerie Robinson; Bev Shingles; Irene Miller; Heather Thomson	42
3	United States	Doris Brown; Janet Bristol; Beth Bonner; Trina Hosmer	51
4	Netherlands	Berny Lenferink; Annie van den Kerkhof; Anneke Stalman; Joke van de Stelt	71
5	Wales	Thelwyn Bateman; Jean Lochhead; Bronwen Cardy; Gloria Dourass	90
6	Italy	Zina Boniolo; Waltraud Egger; Margherita Gargano; Giuseppina Torello	98
7	Ireland	Ann O'Brien; Deirdre Foreman; Mary Lynch; Kate Moroney	111
8	Scotland	Christine Haskett; Margaret MacSherry; Sandra Sutherland; Ann Barrass	124
9	Spain	Belen Azpeitia; Pilar San Martin; Begona Zuñiga; Maria Fuentes	156
10	Belgium	Christina van Loock; Liève van den Broeck; Josee van Santberghe; Monique Dockx	190

== Participation ==
An unofficial count yields the participation of 228 athletes from 18 countries.

- Algeria (11)
- Belgium (18)
- England (20)
- Finland (8)
- France (14)
- Ireland (19)
- Italy (19)
- Morocco (12)
- Netherlands (5)
- New Zealand (14)
- Northern Ireland (11)
- Poland (7)
- Portugal (4)
- Scotland (20)
- Spain (20)
- Switzerland (7)
- United States (6)
- Wales (13)

== See also ==
- 1971 in athletics (track and field)
