= 1976 IAAF World Cross Country Championships – Senior men's race =

Senior men's race at the 1976 IAAF World Cross Country Championships
- Organisers: IAAF
- Edition: 4th
- Date: 28 February
- Host city: Chepstow, Wales, UK (United Kingdom)
- Venue: Chepstow Racecourse
- Events: 1
- Distances: 12 km – Senior men
- Participation: 156 athletes from 19 nations

The Senior men's race at the 1976 IAAF World Cross Country Championships was held in Chepstow, Wales, at the Chepstow Racecourse on 28 February 1976. A report on the event was given in the Glasgow Herald.

Complete results, medallists, and the results of British athletes were published.

== Race results ==
=== Senior men's race (12 km) ===
==== Individual ====
Rank	Athlete	Country	Time
1st place, gold medalist(s)	Carlos Lopes	Portugal	34:47.8
2nd place, silver medalist(s)	Tony Simmons	England	35:04
3rd place, bronze medalist(s)	Bernie Ford	England	35:07
4	Karel Lismont	Belgium	35:08
5	Detlef Uhlemann	West Germany	35:09
6	Enn Sellik	Soviet Union	35:17
7	Gary Tuttle	United States	35:19
8	Franco Fava	Italy	35:21
9	Jacques Boxberger	France	35:24
10	Tapio Kantanen	Finland	35:28
11	Mariano Haro	Spain	35:28
12	Vladimir Merkushin	Soviet Union	35:30
13	Gaston Roelants	Belgium	35:30
14	Venanzio Ortis	Italy	35:36
15	David Slater	England	35:40
16	Grenville Tuck	England	35:40
17	Hendrik Schoofs	Belgium	35:41
18	Lucien Rault	France	35:42
19	Eddy Rombaux	Belgium	35:43
20	Tony Sandoval	United States	35:44
21	Larbi M'Hidra	Morocco	35:46
22	Hans-Jürgen Orthmann	West Germany	35:52
23	Ivan Parluy	Soviet Union	35:53
24	Jim Brown	Scotland	35:54
25	Jean-Paul Gomez	France	35:55
26	David Black	England	35:56
27	Willy Polleunis	Belgium	35:57
28	Mike Tagg	England	35:59
29	Michael Karst	West Germany	36:00
30	Neil Cusack	Ireland	36:00
31	Glen Grant	Wales	36:03
32	Jean-Luc Paugam	France	36:04
33	Giuseppe Cindolo	Italy	36:04
34	Allister Hutton	Scotland	36:04
35	Steve Gibbons	Wales	36:04
36	Abdelkader Zaddem	Tunisia	36:07
37	Don Kardong	United States	36:07
38	Robert Lismont	Belgium	36:07
39	Dave Babiracki	United States	36:08
40	Luigi Zarcone	Italy	36:08
41	Andrew McKean	Scotland	36:08
42	Nikolay Puklakov	Soviet Union	36:09
43	David Hopkins	Wales	36:11
44	Anacleto Pinto	Portugal	36:13
45	Mikhail Ulymov	Soviet Union	36:16
46	Dominique Coux	France	36:17
47	Steve Kenyon	England	36:17
48	Peter Weigt	West Germany	36:18
49	Eric De Beck	Belgium	36:19
50	Adelaziz Bouguerra	Tunisia	36:21
51	José Luis Ruiz	Spain	36:25
52	Anders Gärderud	Sweden	36:26
53	Danny McDaid	Ireland	36:27
54	John Davies	Wales	36:29
55	Thomas Brennan	Ireland	36:29
56	Donal Walsh	Ireland	36:30
57	Alex Gonzalez	France	36:30
58	Glenn Herold	United States	36:31
59	Seppo Nikkari	Finland	36:31
60	Torgny Björkqvist	Sweden	36:32
61	Esko Lipsonen	Finland	36:32
62	Luigi Lauro	Italy	36:35
63	Radhouane Bouster	France	36:42
64	Boualem Rahoui	Algeria	36:43
65	Gilbert Maesschalk	Belgium	36:45
66	Malcolm Thomas	Wales	36:47
67	Claudio Solone	Italy	36:49
68	Haddou Jaddour	Morocco	36:49
69	Jouko Santanen	Finland	36:49
70	Juan Hidalgo	Spain	36:50
71	Patrick Martin	France	36:50
72	Joseph Patton	Scotland	36:51
73	Jukka Toivola	Finland	36:51
74	Ricardo Ortega	Spain	36:53
75	Mick Morris	Wales	36:53
76	Seppo Tuominen	Finland	36:54
77	Mohamed Kacemi	Algeria	36:55
78	Khaled Aït Idir	Algeria	36:56
79	Helder de Jesús	Portugal	36:56
80	Fernando Mamede	Portugal	36:58
81	Laurence Reilly	Scotland	36:59
82	Henry Perez	United States	37:00
83	Reinhard Leibold	West Germany	37:00
84	Smain Yahiaoui	Algeria	37:01
85	Fernando Fernandez	Spain	37:02
86	Dahou Belghazi	Morocco	37:03
87	Mustapha Oulghazi	Morocco	37:03
88	José Sena	Portugal	37:03
89	Rachid Habchaoui	Algeria	37:03
90	Pierre Levisse	France	37:03
91	Vadim Mokalov	Soviet Union	37:07
92	Steve Flanagan	United States	37:08
93	David Logue	Northern Ireland	37:10
94	Martti Kiilholma	Finland	37:11
95	Paddy Coyle	Ireland	37:12
96	Jim Alder	Scotland	37:12
97	Eddy Van Mullem	Belgium	37:12
98	Paul Kenney	Scotland	37:12
99	Santiago de la Parte	Spain	37:14
100	Mateo Gómez	Spain	37:16
101	Mike Teer	Northern Ireland	37:17
102	Aniceto Simoes	Portugal	37:22
103	Vasco Pereira	Portugal	37:22
104	Pär Wallin	Sweden	37:24
105	Robert Manz	West Germany	37:25
106	Abdelmadjid Mada	Algeria	37:25
107	Moumoh Haddou	Morocco	37:27
108	John Hartnett	Ireland	37:28
109	Dic Evans	Wales	37:29
110	Sergio Muscardin	Italy	37:32
111	Hussein Soltani	Tunisia	37:34
112	Andy Holden	England	37:35
113	Lahcen El Hachmi	Morocco	37:39
114	Mansour Guettaya	Tunisia	37:42
115	Omar Anassi	Morocco	37:44
116	Tahar Bounab	Algeria	37:45
117	Eloi Schleder	Brazil	37:48
118	Mohamed Ghannouchi	Morocco	37:50
119	Tom Annett	Northern Ireland	37:52
120	Ismo Toukonen	Finland	37:52
121	Mohamed Salem	Algeria	37:53
122	Jan Hagelbrand	Sweden	37:55
123	Gerry Deegan	Ireland	37:56
124	Giuseppe Gerbi	Italy	38:02
125	Dick Crowley	Ireland	38:05
126	Philip Dolan	Scotland	38:05
127	Mohamed Benbaraka	Morocco	38:06
128	Ali Gammoudi	Tunisia	38:08
129	Dennis Coates	England	38:08
130	Lars Enqvist	Sweden	38:15
131	Peter Ratcliffe	Wales	38:19
132	Gunnar Holm	Sweden	38:19
133	Greg Hannon	Northern Ireland	38:22
134	Lawrie Spence	Scotland	38:25
135	Mohamed Zaidi	Tunisia	38:26
136	Wilhelm Jungbluth	West Germany	38:28
137	Mike Critchley	Wales	38:29
138	Carlos Alves	Brazil	38:35
139	Roy Kissin	United States	38:36
140	Carlos Cabral	Portugal	38:39
141	Italo Tentorini	Italy	38:47
142	Hamida Gamoudi	Tunisia	38:52
143	Günther Zahn	West Germany	39:03
144	Gerry Finnegan	Ireland	39:10
145	Labidi Ayachi	Tunisia	39:25
146	Ian Morrison	Northern Ireland	39:27
147	Mahmoud Hazzazi	Algeria	39:44
148	Cherif Hannchi	Tunisia	39:59
149	Aloisio de Araújo	Brazil	40:13
150	John Allen	Northern Ireland	40:20
151	Tom Falkinger	Sweden	41:00
152	Leonardo de Oliveira	Brazil	41:36
153	Paulo Ferrugen	Brazil	41:42
—	Antonio Campos	Spain	DNF
—	Fernando Cerrada	Spain	DNF
—	Rich Kimball	United States	DNF

==== Teams ====
Rank	Team	Points
1st place, gold medalist(s)	England: Tony Simmons / 2; Bernie Ford / 3; David Slater / 15; Grenville Tuck / 16; David Black / 26; Mike Tagg / 28; (Steve Kenyon) / (47); (Andy Holden) / (112); (Dennis Coates) / (129)	90
2nd place, silver medalist(s)	Belgium: Karel Lismont / 4; Gaston Roelants / 13; Hendrik Schoofs / 17; Eddy Rombaux / 19; Willy Polleunis / 27; Robert Lismont / 38; (Eric De Beck) / (49); (Gilbert Maesschalk) / (65); (Eddy Van Mullem) / (97)	118
3rd place, bronze medalist(s)	France: Jacques Boxberger / 9; Lucien Rault / 18; Jean-Paul Gomez / 25; Jean-Luc Paugam / 32; Dominique Coux / 46; Alex Gonzalez / 57; (Radhouane Bouster) / (63); (Patrick Martin) / (71); (Pierre Levisse) / (90)	187
4	Soviet Union: Enn Sellik / 6; Vladimir Merkushin / 12; Ivan Parluy / 23; Nikolay Puklakov / 42; Mikhail Ulymov / 45; Vadim Mokalov / 91	219
5	Italy: Franco Fava / 8; Venanzio Ortis / 14; Giuseppe Cindolo / 33; Luigi Zarcone / 40; Luigi Lauro / 62; Claudio Solone / 67; (Sergio Muscardin) / (110); (Giuseppe Gerbi) / (124); (Italo Tentorini) / (141)	224
6	United States: Gary Tuttle / 7; Tony Sandoval / 20; Don Kardong / 37; Dave Babiracki / 39; Glenn Herold / 58; Henry Perez / 82; (Steve Flanagan) / (92); (Roy Kissin) / (139); (Rich Kimball) / (DNF)	243
7	West Germany: Detlef Uhlemann / 5; Hans-Jürgen Orthmann / 22; Michael Karst / 29; Peter Weigt / 48; Reinhard Leibold / 83; Robert Manz / 105; (Wilhelm Jungbluth) / (136); (Günther Zahn) / (143)	292
8	Wales: Glen Grant / 31; Steve Gibbons / 35; David Hopkins / 43; John Davies / 54; Malcolm Thomas / 66; Mick Morris / 75; (Dic Evans) / (109); (Peter Ratcliffe) / (131); (Mike Critchley) / (137)	304
9	Finland: Tapio Kantanen / 10; Seppo Nikkari / 59; Esko Lipsonen / 61; Jouko Santanen / 69; Jukka Toivola / 73; Seppo Tuominen / 76; (Martti Kiilholma) / (94); (Ismo Toukonen) / (120)	348
10	Scotland: Jim Brown / 24; Allister Hutton / 34; Andrew McKean / 41; Joseph Patton / 72; Laurence Reilly / 81; Jim Alder / 96; (Paul Kenney) / (98); (Philip Dolan) / (126); (Lawrie Spence) / (134)	348
11	Spain: Mariano Haro / 11; José Luis Ruiz / 51; Juan Hidalgo / 70; Ricardo Ortega / 74; Fernando Fernandez / 85; Santiago de la Parte / 99; (Mateo Gómez) / (100); (Antonio Campos) / (DNF); (Fernando Cerrada) / (DNF)	390
12	Portugal: Carlos Lopes / 1; Anacleto Pinto / 44; Helder de Jesús / 79; Fernando Mamede / 80; José Sena / 88; Aniceto Simoes / 102; (Vasco Pereira) / (103); (Carlos Cabral) / (140)	394
13	Ireland: Neil Cusack / 30; Danny McDaid / 53; Thomas Brennan / 55; Donal Walsh / 56; Paddy Coyle / 95; John Hartnett / 108; (Gerry Deegan) / (123); (Dick Crowley) / (125); (Gerry Finnegan) / (144)	397
14	Morocco: Larbi M'Hidra / 21; Haddou Jaddour / 68; Dahou Belghazi / 86; Mustapha Oulghazi / 87; Moumoh Haddou / 107; Lahcen El Hachmi / 113; (Omar Anassi) / (115); (Mohamed Ghannouchi) / (118); (Mohamed Benbaraka) / (127)	482
15	Algeria: Boualem Rahoui / 64; Mohamed Kacemi / 77; Khaled Aït Idir / 78; Smain Yahiaoui / 84; Rachid Habchaoui / 89; Abdelmadjid Mada / 106; (Tahar Bounab) / (116); (Mohamed Salem) / (121); (Mahmoud Hazzazi) / (147)	498
16	Tunisia: Abdelkader Zaddem / 36; Adelaziz Bouguerra / 50; Hussein Soltani / 111; Mansour Guettaya / 114; Ali Gammoudi / 128; Mohamed Zaidi / 135; (Hamida Gamoudi) / (142); (Labidi Ayachi) / (145); (Cherif Hannchi) / (148)	574
17	Sweden: Anders Gärderud / 52; Torgny Björkqvist / 60; Pär Wallin / 104; Jan Hagelbrand / 122; Lars Enqvist / 130; Gunnar Holm / 132; (Tom Falkinger) / (151)	600
18	Northern Ireland: David Logue / 93; Mike Teer / 101; Tom Annett / 119; Greg Hannon / 133; Ian Morrison / 146; John Allen / 150	742

- Note: Athletes in parentheses did not score for the team result

== Participation ==
An unofficial count yields the participation of 156 athletes from 19 countries in the Senior men's race. This is in agreement with the official numbers as published.

- Algeria (9)
- Belgium (9)
- Brazil (5)
- England (9)
- Finland (8)
- France (9)
- Ireland (9)
- Italy (9)
- Morocco (9)
- Northern Ireland (6)
- Portugal (8)
- Scotland (9)
- Soviet Union (6)
- Spain (9)
- Sweden (7)
- Tunisia (9)
- United States (9)
- Wales (9)
- West Germany (8)

== See also ==
- 1976 IAAF World Cross Country Championships – Junior men's race
- 1976 IAAF World Cross Country Championships – Senior women's race
