= 1970 International Cross Country Championships =

- Organisers: ICCU
- Edition: 57th
- Date: March 22
- Host city: Vichy, Auvergne, France; Frederick, Maryland, United States (alternate women's event)
- Venue: VFW Country Club (women, Frederick)
- Events: 3 / 1
- Distances: 7.5 mi / 12.1 km (men); 4.35 mi / 7.0 km (junior men); 1.9 mi / 3.0 km (women, Vichy); 2.5 mi / 4.0 km (women, Frederick)
- Participation: 211 athletes from 17 nations

The 1970 International Cross Country Championships was held in Vichy, France, on March 22, 1970. An alternate women's championship was held one day earlier in Frederick, Maryland, United States at the VFW Country Club, on March 21, 1970. A report on the Vichy event as well as on the Frederick event was given in the Glasgow Herald.

Complete results for men, junior men, women (Vichy), women (Frederick), medallists, and the results of British athletes were published.

== Medallists ==
Event	Gold		Silver		Bronze	
Individual
Men; 7.5 mi (12.1 km)	Mike Tagg; England	36:39.8	Gaston Roelants; Belgium	36:41.8	Trevor Wright; England	36:44.6
Junior Men; 4.35 mi (7.0 km)	John Hartnett; Ireland	21:57.2	Jack Lane; England	22:05.2	Eric de Beck; Belgium	22:09.2
Women (Vichy); 1.9 mi (3.0 km)	Paola Pigni; Italy	10:38.4	Zofia Kołakowska; Poland	10:39.2	Ilja Keizer; Netherlands	10:43.8
Women (Frederick); 2.5 mi (4.0 km)	Doris Brown; United States	15:04	Rita Lincoln; England	15:11	Thelma Fynn; Canada	15:14
Team
Men	England	35	France	85	Belgium	136
Junior Men	England	15	Belgium	15	Italy	34
Women (Vichy)	Netherlands	19	France	39	Italy	45
Women (Frederick)	England	18	United States	46	Ireland	48

== Individual Race Results ==
=== Men's (7.5 mi / 12.1 km) ===
Rank	Athlete	Nationality	Time
1st place, gold medalist(s)	Mike Tagg	England	36:39.8
2nd place, silver medalist(s)	Gaston Roelants	Belgium	36:41.8
3rd place, bronze medalist(s)	Trevor Wright	England	36:44.6
4	Dick Taylor	England	36:50.8
5	Noel Tijou	France	37:03.2
6	Ricky Wilde	England	37:07
7	Mike Turner	England	37:09.8
8	Abdelkader Zaddem	Tunisia	37:11
9	Javier Álvarez	Spain	37:14
10	René Jourdan	France	37:15
11	Lucien Rault	France	37:19
12	Lachie Stewart	Scotland	37:28
13	Emiel Puttemans	Belgium	37:29
14	Mike Baxter	England	37:30
15	Michel Bernard	France	37:36
16	Mhedheb Hannachi	Tunisia	37:37
17	Adelaziz Bouguerra	Tunisia	37:38
18	Bernie Plain	Wales	37:40
19	Joseph Prinsen	Belgium	37:44
20	Antoine Borowski	France	37:50
21	Derek Graham	Northern Ireland	37:53
22	John Caine	England	37:55
23	Grant McLaren	Canada	37:57
24	Jean-Pierre Ouine	France	37:58
25	Bill Mullett	Scotland	37:59
26	Giovanni Pizzi	Italy	38:01
27	Werner Dössegger	Switzerland	38:05
28	Juan Hidalgo	Spain	38:06
29	Achille Vaes	Belgium	38:07
30	Paul Thijs	Belgium	38:08
31	Jim Alder	Scotland	38:11
32	Ron Grove	England	38:12
33	Dave Ellis	Canada	38:13
34	Hamdouni Sghaier	Tunisia	38:16
35	Sean O'Sullivan	Ireland	38:18
36	Pat Gilseman	Ireland	38:19
37	Hamoud Ameur	France	38:20
38	Mohamed Kheddar	France	38:22
39	Renato Martini	Italy	38:23
40	Giuseppe Ardizzone	Italy	38:24
41	Bob Moore	Canada	38:25
42	Adrian Weatherhead	Scotland	38:27
43	André de Hertoghe	Belgium	38:29
44	Ali Khamassi	Tunisia	38:37
45	Dick Wedlock	Scotland	38:38
46	Norman Morrison	Scotland	38:39
47	André Ornelis	Belgium	38:44
48	Kenny Moore	United States	38:45
49	Johnny Dumon	Belgium	38:46
50	Brunello Bertolin	Italy	38:48
51	Tom Heinonen	United States	38:49
52	Tom O'Riordan	Ireland	38:51
53	Fernando Fernandez	Spain	38:53
54	Paddy Coyle	Ireland	38:54
55	Georg Kaiser	Switzerland	38:54
56	Giacomo Marietta	Italy	38:57
57	Gareth Bryan-Jones	Scotland	38:58
58	Jan Briers	Belgium	38:58
59	Mike Teer	Northern Ireland	38:59
60	Nigel Evans	Wales	39:02
61	Malcolm Thomas	Wales	39:02
62	Giuseppe Cindolo	Italy	39:07
63	Matt Murphy	Ireland	39:08
64	John Loeschhorn	United States	39:09
65	José Maiz	Spain	39:10
66	David Logue	Northern Ireland	39:14
67	Alan Joslyn	Wales	39:16
68	Labidi Ayachi	Tunisia	39:20
69	Carlos Pérez	Spain	
70	Ray Haswell	Canada	
71	Tony Simmons	Wales	
72	Josef Wirth	Switzerland	39:22
73	Amor Lassoued	Tunisia	
74	Osvaldo Segrada	Italy	
75	Eddie Spillane	Ireland	
76	Cliff Clark	United States	
77	Albrecht Moser	Switzerland	39:34
78	Fernando Aguilar	Spain	
79	Josef Fähndrich	Switzerland	39:36
80	Cyril Pennington	Northern Ireland	
81	Primo Gretter	Italy	
82	Pedro Sacristán	Spain	
83	Fritz Schneider	Switzerland	39:46
84	Guy Texereau	France	
85	Bill Stoddart	Scotland	
86	Malcolm Edger	Northern Ireland	
87	John Sheridan	Ireland	
88	Hans Lang	Switzerland	40:03
89	Antonio Frechilla	Spain	
90	John Mooney	Ireland	
91	Paul Darney	Wales	
92	Charles Messenger	United States	
93	Bill Norris	United States	
94	Jorge Gonzalez	Spain	
95	Dave Bedford	England	
96	Michel Jossen	Switzerland	40:27
97	Dave Surman	Canada	
98	Alfred Chivers	Northern Ireland	
99	David Walker	Wales	
100	Jerry Tighe	Canada	
101	Mick Goerke	Canada	
102	Tom Price	Northern Ireland	
103	Max Walti	Switzerland	41:49
—	Ian McCafferty	Scotland	DNF
—	Umberto Risi	Italy	DNF
—	Joe Scanlon	Ireland	DNF
—	Timothy Hendricks	United States	DNF

=== Junior Men's (4.35 mi / 7.0 km) ===
Rank	Athlete	Nationality	Time
1st place, gold medalist(s)	John Hartnett	Ireland	21:57.2
2nd place, silver medalist(s)	Jack Lane	England	22:05.2
3rd place, bronze medalist(s)	Eric De Beck	Belgium	22:09.2
4	Eddy Van Mullem	Belgium	22:17.4
5	Colin Falconer	Scotland	22:25.4
6	Jim Milton	England	22:32.4
7	Graham Tuck	England	22:36.8
8	Willy Vanlaer	Belgium	22:39.8
9	Aldo Tomasini	Italy	22:41.8
10	Franco Fava	Italy	22:41.8
11	Francesco Silvestre	Spain	22:42
12	Grenville Tuck	England	22:49
13	Ronald MacDonald	Scotland	23:00
14	Kamel Guemar	Algeria	23:06
15	Franco Veronese	Italy	23:07
16	René Portier	France	23:08
17	Julien Devos	Belgium	23:09
18	Pol Quemener	France	23:09
19	William Burns	Scotland	23:10
20	Daniel Murphy	Ireland	23:11
21	Mario Gilardi	Italy	23:11
22	Marc Masselot	France	23:12
23	Eddie Leddy	Ireland	23:12
24	Ramon Sanchez	Spain	23:13
25	Douglas Gunstone	Scotland	23:14
26	Gérard Thomazo	France	23:18
27	Andres Jimeno	Spain	23:23
28	Chris Garforth	England	23:31
29	Attallah Djelloul	Algeria	23:38
30	Zygmunt Lyznicki	Poland	23:44
31	Leslie Irvine	Scotland	23:45
32	Blaise Schull	Switzerland	23:46
33	Philip Brennan	Ireland	23:48
34	Francisco Santamaria	Spain	23:51
35	Richard Umberg	Switzerland	23:55
36	Abdelhaziz Belhocine	Algeria	23:57
37	Etienne Sinic	France	23:58
38	Eduardo Perez	Spain	24:06
39	Howard Wallace	Ireland	24:08
40	Fritz Rüegsegger	Switzerland	24:24
41	Roland Gehrig	Switzerland	24:30
42	Bruno Ehrler	Switzerland	24:48
43	Ryszard Ciucias	Poland	
44	Mohamed Salem	Algeria	
—	Sid-Ali Djouadi	Algeria	DNF
—	Paul Coulon	Belgium	DNF
—	Armando Scozzari	Italy	DNF

=== Women's (Vichy, 1.9 mi / 3.0 km) ===
Rank	Athlete	Nationality	Time
1st place, gold medalist(s)	Paola Pigni	Italy	10:38.4
2nd place, silver medalist(s)	Zofia Kołakowska	Poland	10:39.2
3rd place, bronze medalist(s)	Ilja Keizer	Netherlands	10:43.8
4	Anneloes Bosman	Netherlands	10:54.4
5	Berny Lenferink	Netherlands	11:02
6	Nicole Chassagneux	France	11:03.6
7	Anneke de Lange	Netherlands	11:06.4
8	Teresa Testerini	Italy	11:15
9	Carla Joosten	Netherlands	11:15
10	Claudette Brouard	France	11:15
11	Joëlle Audibert	France	11:20
12	Eliane Rieuf	France	11:22
13	Krystyna Sladek	Poland	11:24
14	Josee van Santberghe	Belgium	11:26
15	Liève van den Broeck	Belgium	11:27
16	Zina Boniolo	Italy	11:32
17	Jadwiga Kalinowska	Poland	11:32
18	Françoise Valentini	France	12:14
19	Francine Peyskens	Belgium	12:19
20	Margherita Gargano	Italy	12:21
21	Marie-Claire Decroix	Belgium	12:24
22	Catherine Michaud	France	12:28
23	Barbara Rubaszewska	Poland	13:46

=== Women's (Frederick, 2.5 mi / 4.0 km) ===
Rank	Athlete	Nationality	Time
1st place, gold medalist(s)	Doris Brown	United States	15:04,4
2nd place, silver medalist(s)	Rita Lincoln	England	15:11
3rd place, bronze medalist(s)	Thelma Fynn	Canada	15:14
4	Barbara Banks	England	15:21
5	Joan Page	England	15:25
6	Margaret MacSherry	Scotland	15:27
7	Gillian Tivey	England	15:30
8	Christine Haskett	Scotland	15:31
9	Ann O'Brien	Ireland	15:33
10	Peggy Mullins	Ireland	15:34
11	Jean Lochhead	Wales	15:35
12	Deirdre Foreman	Ireland	15:37
13	Francie Larrieu	United States	15:42
14	Pamela Bagian	United States	15:45
15	Sandra Harper	Canada	15:46
16	Joyce Smith	England	15:47
17	Jane McNicholl	Ireland	15:51
18	Cheryl Bridges	United States	16:02
19	Hope Bishop	Canada	16:06
20	Pat Lowe	England	16:08
21	Nancy Main	Canada	16:11
22	Bronwen Cardy	Wales	16:23
23	Gloria Dourass	Wales	16:24
24	Doreen Martins	Canada	16:28
25	Paula Molesky	Canada	16:33
26	Sheena Fitzmaurice	Scotland	16:56
27	Raie Thompson	Australia	16:47
28	Sandra Kirk	Scotland	16:56
29	Nuala Bowe	Ireland	17:06
30	Patricia Cole	United States	17:09
31	Delyth Davies	Wales	17:17
32	Shirley Springer	United States	17:18
33	Pamela John	Wales	17:29
34	Adrienne Beames	Australia	17:44

== Team Results ==
=== Men's ===
Rank	Country	Team	Points
1	England	Mike Tagg; Trevor Wright; Dick Taylor; Ricky Wilde; Mike Turner; Mike Baxter	35
2	France	Noel Tijou; René Jourdan; Lucien Rault; Michel Bernard; Antoine Borowski; Jean-Pierre Ouine	85
3	Belgium	Gaston Roelants; Emiel Puttemans; Joseph Prinsen; Achille Vaes; Paul Thijs; André de Hertoghe	136
4	Tunisia	Abdelkader Zaddem; Mhedheb Hannachi; Adelaziz Bouguerra; Hamdouni Sghaier; Ali Khamassi; Labidi Ayachi	187
5	Scotland	Lachie Stewart; Bill Mullett; Jim Alder; Adrian Weatherhead; Dick Wedlock; Norman Morrison	201
6	Italy	Giovanni Pizzi; Renato Martini; Giuseppe Ardizzone; Brunello Bertolin; Giacomo Marietta; Giuseppe Cindolo	273
7	Spain	Javier Álvarez; Juan Hidalgo; Fernando Fernandez; José Maiz; Carlos Pérez; Fernando Aguilar	302
8	Ireland	Sean O'Sullivan; Pat Gilseman; Tom O'Riordan; Paddy Coyle; Matt Murphy; Eddie Spillane	315
9	Canada	Grant McLaren; Dave Ellis; Bob Moore; Ray Haswell; Dave Surman; Jerry Tighe	364
10	Wales	Bernie Plain; Nigel Evans; Malcolm Thomas; Alan Joslyn; Tony Simmons; Paul Darney	368
11	Switzerland	Werner Dössegger; Georg Kaiser; Josef Wirth; Albrecht Moser; Josef Fähndrich; Fritz Schneider	393
12	Northern Ireland	Derek Graham; Mike Teer; David Logue; Cyril Pennington; Malcolm Edger; Alfred Chivers	410
13	United States	Kenny Moore; Tom Heinonen; John Loeschhorn; Cliff Clark; Charles Messenger; Bill Norris	424

=== Junior Men's ===
Rank	Country	Team	Points
1	England	Jack Lane; Jim Milton; Graham Tuck	15
2	Belgium	Eric De Beck; Eddy Van Mullem; Willy van Laer	15
3	Italy	Aldo Tomasini; Franco Fava; Franco Veronese	34
4	Scotland	Colin Falconer; Ronald MacDonald; William Burns	37
5	Ireland	John Hartnett; Daniel Murphy; Eddie Leddy	44
6	France	René Portier; Pol Quemener; Marc Masselot	56
7	Spain	Francesco Silvestre; Ramon Sanchez; Andres Jimeno	62
8	Algeria	Kamel Guemar; Attallah Djelloul; Abdelhaziz Belhocine	79
9	Switzerland	Blaise Schull; Richard Umberg; Fritz Rüegsegger	107

=== Women's (Vichy) ===
Rank	Country	Team	Points
1	Netherlands	Ilja Keizer; Anneloes Bosman; Berny Lenferink; Anneke de Lange	19
2	France	Nicole Chassagneux; Claudette Brouard; Joëlle Audibert; Eliane Rieuf	39
3	Italy	Paola Pigni; Teresa Testerini; Zina Boniolo; Margherita Gargano	45
4	Poland	Zofia Kołakowska; Krystyna Sladek; Jadwiga Kalinowska; Barbara Rubaszewska	55
5	Belgium	Josee van Santberghe; Liève van den Broeck; Francine Peyskens; Marie-Claire Decroix	69

=== Women's (Frederick) ===
Rank	Country	Team	Points
1	England	Rita Lincoln; Barbara Banks; Joan Page; Gillian Tivey	18
2	United States	Doris Brown; Francie Larrieu; Pamela Bagian; Cheryl Bridges	46
3	Ireland	Ann O'Brien; Peggy Mullins; Deirdre Foreman; Jane McNicholl	48
4	Canada	Thelma Fynn; Sandra Harper; Hope Bishop; Nancy Main	58
5	Scotland	Margaret MacSherry; Christine Haskett; Sheena Fitzmaurice; Sandra Kirk	68
6	Wales	Jean Lochhead; Bronwen Cardy; Gloria Dourass; Delyth Davies	87

== Participation ==
An unofficial count yields the participation of 211 athletes from 17 countries.

- Algeria (5)
- Australia (2)
- Belgium (18)
- Canada (13)
- England (20)
- France (20)
- Ireland (19)
- Italy (18)
- Netherlands (5)
- Northern Ireland (7)
- Poland (6)
- Scotland (18)
- Spain (14)
- Switzerland (14)
- Tunisia (7)
- United States (13)
- Wales (12)

== See also ==
- 1970 in athletics (track and field)
