= 1974 IAAF World Cross Country Championships – Senior men's race =

Senior men's race at the 1974 IAAF World Cross Country Championships
- Organisers: IAAF
- Edition: 2nd
- Date: March 16, 1974
- Host city: Monza, Lombardia, Italy
- Venue: Mirabello Racecourse
- Events: 1
- Distances: 12 km – Senior men
- Participation: 125 athletes from 19 nations

The Senior men's race at the 1974 IAAF World Cross Country Championships was held in Monza, Italy, at the Mirabello Racecourse on March 16, 1974. A report on the event was given in the Glasgow Herald.

Complete results, medallists, and the results of British athletes were published.

== Race results ==
- Athletes in parentheses did not score for the team result

=== Senior men's race (12 km) ===
Individual
| Rank | Athlete | Country | Time |
|---|---|---|---|
| 1st place, gold medalist(s) | Eric de Beck | Belgium | 35:23.8 |
| 2nd place, silver medalist(s) | Mariano Haro | Spain | 35:24.6 |
| 3rd place, bronze medalist(s) | Karel Lismont | Belgium | 35:26.6 |
| 4 | Jim Brown | Scotland | 35:29.2 |
| 5 | Detlef Uhlemann | West Germany | 35:30.4 |
| 6 | Wilfried Scholz | East Germany | 35:31.8 |
| 7 | Ray Smedley | England | 35:35.8 |
| 8 | Noel Tijou | France | 35:36.4 |
| 9 | David Black | England | 35:37.2 |
| 10 | Franco Fava | Italy | 35:38.4 |
| 11 | Bernie Ford | England | 35:48.4 |
| 12 | Manfred Kuschmann | East Germany | 35:54.2 |
| 13 | Marc Smet | Belgium | 36:00.8 |
| 14 | Gaston Roelants | Belgium | 36:03.2 |
| 15 | Pekka Päivärinta | Finland | 36:06.2 |
| 16 | Grenville Tuck | England | 36:07.6 |
| 17 | Per Halle | Norway | 36:08.4 |
| 18 | Tapio Kantanen | Finland | 36:12.6 |
| 19 | Abdelkader Zaddem | Tunisia | 36:16.4 |
| 20 | Lucien Rault | France | 36:18.6 |
| 21 | Luigi Lauro | Italy | 36:24 |
| 22 | Michael Karst | West Germany | 36:26.6 |
| 23 | Eddie Leddy | Ireland | 36:27 |
| 24 | Karl-Heinz Leiteritz | East Germany | 36:28.8 |
| 25 | Gerald Umbach | East Germany | 36:29.8 |
| 26 | Santiago de la Parte | Spain | 36:30.8 |
| 27 | Frank Grillaert | Belgium | 36:32.6 |
| 28 | Claudio Solone | Italy | 36:34 |
| 29 | Knut Børø | Norway | 36:34.6 |
| 30 | Frank Briscoe | England | 36:35.4 |
| 31 | Ron MacDonald | Scotland | |
| 32 | Anders Gärderud | Sweden | |
| 33 | Seppo Nikkari | Finland | |
| 34 | Bram Wassenaar | Netherlands | |
| 35 | Haico Scharn | Netherlands | |
| 36 | Mike Beevor | England | |
| 37 | Reinhard Leibold | West Germany | |
| 38 | Pierre Liardet | France | |
| 39 | Jean-Jacques Prianon | France | |
| 40 | Mike Tagg | England | |
| 41 | Mohamed Belhoucine | Morocco | |
| 42 | Malcolm Thomas | Wales | |
| 43 | Haddou Jaddour | Morocco | |
| 44 | Gerd Frähmcke | West Germany | |
| 45 | Erik Gijselinck | Belgium | |
| 46 | Andrew McKean | Scotland | |
| 47 | Colin Falconer | Scotland | |
| 48 | Donal Walsh | Ireland | |
| 49 | René Jourdan | France | |
| 50 | Achille Vaes | Belgium | |
| 51 | Göran Högberg | Sweden | |
| 52 | Adelaziz Bouguerra | Tunisia | |
| 53 | Wilhelm Jungbluth | West Germany | |
| 54 | Arne Kvalheim | Norway | |
| 55 | Juan Hidalgo | Spain | |
| 56 | Cor Vriend | Netherlands | |
| 57 | Larbi M'Hidra | Morocco | |
| 58 | Mateo Gómez | Spain | |
| 59 | Theodor Leimbach | West Germany | |
| 60 | José Haro | Spain | |
| 61 | Jean-Paul Gomez | France | |
| 62 | Wolfgang Krüger | West Germany | |
| 63 | Egbert Nijstad | Netherlands | |
| 64 | Desmond McGann | Ireland | |
| 65 | Aldo Tomasini | Italy | |
| 66 | Alistair Blamire | Scotland | |
| 67 | Dahou Belghazi | Morocco | |
| 68 | Marcelino Navarro | Spain | |
| 69 | Robert Patterson | England | |
| 70 | Göran Bengtsson | Sweden | |
| 71 | David Logue | Northern Ireland | |
| 72 | Luigi Zarcone | Italy | |
| 73 | Jürgen Straub | East Germany | |
| 74 | John van der Wansem | Netherlands | |
| 75 | Hendrik Schoofs | Belgium | |
| 76 | Raimo Hämynen | Finland | |
| 77 | Mustapha Oulghazi | Morocco | |
| 78 | Moumoh Haddou | Morocco | |
| 79 | Douglas Gunstone | Scotland | |
| 80 | Gerd Kärlin | Denmark | |
| 81 | Eddie Spillane | Ireland | |
| 82 | Mario Vaiani-Lisi | Italy | |
| 83 | André Gloaguen | France | |
| 84 | Mohamed Sghir | Morocco | |
| 85 | François Lacour | France | |
| 86 | Dietmar Knies | East Germany | |
| 87 | Jean Jacques Boiroux | France | |
| 88 | Jim Alder | Scotland | |
| 89 | Peter Lindtner | Austria | |
| 90 | Fernando Aguilar | Spain | |
| 91 | Clive Thomas | Wales | |
| 92 | Olavi Hedman | Finland | |
| 93 | Abdelkrim Djelassi | Tunisia | |
| 94 | Peter Standing | England | |
| 95 | Paddy Coyle | Ireland | |
| 96 | Hamida Gamoudi | Tunisia | |
| 97 | Laurence Reilly | Scotland | |
| 98 | Miloud Chenna | Morocco | |
| 99 | Mohamed Ghannouchi | Morocco | |
| 100 | Greg Hannon | Northern Ireland | |
| 101 | Hussein Soltani | Tunisia | |
| 102 | Mike Teer | Northern Ireland | |
| 103 | Kyösti Takkinen | Finland | |
| 104 | John Jones | Wales | |
| 105 | Tom O'Riordan | Ireland | |
| 106 | Rabah Zaidi | Tunisia | |
| 107 | Danny McDaid | Ireland | |
| 108 | Theo Geutjes | Netherlands | |
| 109 | Allister Hutton | Scotland | |
| 110 | Tom Annett | Northern Ireland | |
| 111 | Steve Slocombe | Wales | |
| 112 | Joe Scanlon | Ireland | |
| 113 | Steve Gibbons | Wales | |
| 114 | Ian Morrison | Northern Ireland | |
| 115 | Michael Lane | Wales | |
| 116 | Anton Gorbunow | West Germany | |
| 117 | Jim McGuinness | Northern Ireland | |
| 118 | Roelof Veld | Netherlands | |
| 119 | Dennis Fowles | Wales | |
| 120 | Fernando Fernandez | Spain | |
| 121 | David Hopkins | Wales | |
| 122 | Luca Bigatello | Italy | |
| — | José Luis Ruiz | Spain | DNF |
| — | Enrico Cantoreggi | Italy | DNF |
| — | Roberto Gervasini | Italy | DNF |

Teams
| Rank | Team | Points |
|---|---|---|
| 1st place, gold medalist(s) | Belgium: Eric de Beck / 1; Karel Lismont / 3; Marc Smet / 13; Gaston Roelants / 14; Frank Grillaert / 27; Erik Gijselinck / 45; (Achille Vaes) / (50); (Hendrik Schoofs) / (75) | 103 |
| 2nd place, silver medalist(s) | England: Ray Smedley / 7; David Black / 9; Bernie Ford / 11; Grenville Tuck / 16; Frank Briscoe / 30; Mike Beevor / 36; (Mike Tagg) / (40); (Robert Patterson) / (69); (Peter Standing) / (94) | 109 |
| 3rd place, bronze medalist(s) | France: Noel Tijou / 8; Lucien Rault / 20; Pierre Liardet / 38; Jean-Jacques Prianon / 39; René Jourdan / 49; Jean-Paul Gomez / 61; (André Gloaguen) / (83); (François Lacour) / (85); (Jean Jacques Boiroux) / (87) | 215 |
| 4 | West Germany: Detlef Uhlemann / 5; Michael Karst / 22; Reinhard Leibold / 37; Gerd Frähmcke / 44; Wilhelm Jungbluth / 53; Theodor Leimbach / 59; (Wolfgang Krüger) / (62); (Anton Gorbunow) / (116) | 220 |
| 5 | East Germany: Wilfried Scholz / 6; Manfred Kuschmann / 12; Karl-Heinz Leiteritz / 24; Gerald Umbach / 25; Jürgen Straub / 73; Dietmar Knies / 86 | 226 |
| 6 | Spain: Mariano Haro / 2; Santiago de la Parte / 26; Juan Hidalgo / 55; Mateo Gómez / 58; José Haro / 60; Marcelino Navarro / 68; (Fernando Aguilar) / (90); (Fernando Fernandez) / (120); (José Luis Ruiz) / (DNF) | 269 |
| 7 | Scotland: Jim Brown / 4; Ron MacDonald / 31; Andrew McKean / 46; Colin Falconer / 47; Alistair Blamire / 66; Douglas Gunstone / 79; (Jim Alder) / (88); (Laurence Reilly) / (97); (Allister Hutton) / (109) | 273 |
| 8 | Italy: Franco Fava / 10; Luigi Lauro / 21; Claudio Solone / 28; Aldo Tomasini / 65; Luigi Zarcone / 72; Mario Vaiani-Lisi / 82; (Luca Bigatello) / (122); (Enrico Cantoreggi) / (DNF); (Roberto Gervasini) / (DNF) | 278 |
| 9 | Finland: Pekka Päivärinta / 15; Tapio Kantanen / 18; Seppo Nikkari / 33; Raimo Hämynen / 76; Olavi Hedman / 92; Kyösti Takkinen / 103 | 337 |
| 10 | Morocco: Mohamed Belhoucine / 41; Haddou Jaddour / 43; Larbi M'Hidra / 57; Dahou Belghazi / 67; Mustapha Oulghazi / 77; Moumoh Haddou / 78; (Mohamed Sghir) / (84); (Miloud Chenna) / (98); (Mohamed Ghannouchi) / (99) | 363 |
| 11 | Netherlands: Bram Wassenaar / 34; Haico Scharn / 35; Cor Vriend / 56; Egbert Nijstad / 63; John van der Wansem / 74; Theo Geutjes / 108; (Roelof Veld) / (118) | 370 |
| 12 | Ireland: Eddie Leddy / 23; Donal Walsh / 48; Desmond McGann / 64; Eddie Spillane / 81; Paddy Coyle / 95; Tom O'Riordan / 105; (Danny McDaid) / (107); (Joe Scanlon) / (112) | 416 |
| 13 | Tunisia: Abdelkader Zaddem / 19; Adelaziz Bouguerra / 52; Abdelkrim Djelassi / 93; Hamida Gamoudi / 96; Hussein Soltani / 101; Rabah Zaidi / 106 | 467 |
| 14 | Wales: Malcolm Thomas / 42; Clive Thomas / 91; John Jones / 104; Steve Slocombe / 111; Steve Gibbons / 113; Michael Lane / 115; (Dennis Fowles) / (119); (David Hopkins) / (121) | 576 |
| 15 | Northern Ireland: David Logue / 71; Greg Hannon / 100; Mike Teer / 102; Tom Annett / 110; Ian Morrison / 114; Jim McGuinness / 117 | 614 |

== Participation ==
An unofficial count yields the participation of 125 athletes from 19 countries in the Senior men's race. This is in agreement with the official numbers as published.

- Austria (1)
- Belgium (8)
- Denmark (1)
- East Germany (6)
- England (9)
- Finland (6)
- France (9)
- Ireland (8)
- Italy (9)
- Morocco (9)
- Netherlands (7)
- Northern Ireland (6)
- Norway (3)
- Scotland (9)
- Spain (9)
- Sweden (3)
- Tunisia (6)
- Wales (8)
- West Germany (8)

== See also ==
- 1974 IAAF World Cross Country Championships – Junior men's race
- 1974 IAAF World Cross Country Championships – Senior women's race
