= 1974 IAAF World Cross Country Championships – Senior women's race =

Senior women's race at the 1974 IAAF World Cross Country Championships
- Organisers: IAAF
- Edition: 2nd
- Date: March 16
- Host city: Monza, Lombardia, Italy
- Venue: Mirabello Racecourse
- Events: 1
- Distances: 4 km – Senior women
- Participation: 69 athletes from 13 nations

The Senior women's race at the 1974 IAAF World Cross Country Championships was held in Monza, Italy, at the Mirabello Racecourse on March 16, 1974. A report on the event was given in the Glasgow Herald.

Complete results, medallists, and the results of British athletes were published.

== Race results ==
=== Senior women's race (4 km) ===
==== Individual ====
Rank	Athlete	Country	Time
1st place, gold medalist(s)	Paola Pigni	Italy	12:42
2nd place, silver medalist(s)	Nina Holmén	Finland	12:47.6
3rd place, bronze medalist(s)	Rita Ridley	England	12:54
4	Ann Yeoman	England	12:58.6
5	Pirjo Vihonen	Finland	13:02
6	Bronisława Ludwichowska	Poland	13:03.2
7	Joyce Smith	England	13:04.4
8	Mary Stewart	Scotland	13:05.6
9	Carmen Valero	Spain	13:13.4
10	Margherita Gargano	Italy	13:14.8
11	Josee van Santberghe	Belgium	13:18.6
12	Clara Choate	United States	13:20.8
13	Silvana Cruciata	Italy	13:21.8
14	Carol Gould	England	13:23.8
15	Christine Tranter	England	13:24.2
16	Sinikka Tyynelä	Finland	13:25
17	Marleen Mols	Belgium	13:28.8
18	Joëlle De Brouwer	France	13:29.8
19	Maria Paz de Lucas	Spain	13:30.2
20	Christa Kofferschläger	West Germany	13:31
21	Charlotte Teske	West Germany	13:31.8
22	Glynis Goodburn	England	13:31.8
23	Deirdre Foreman	Ireland	13:32.8
24	Renata Pentlinowska	Poland	13:33
25	Magda Versluys	Belgium	13:33.6
26	Bruna Lovisolo	Italy	13:34.2
27	Julie Brown	United States	13:34.8
28	Cheryl Bridges	United States	13:36.8
29	Mary Lynch	Ireland	13:37.8
30	Joëlle Audibert	France	13:38.4
31	Katy McIntyre	United States	13:38.6
32	Urszula Prasek	Poland	13:39.2
33	Christine Haskett	Scotland	13:39.6
34	Christine Klemme	West Germany	13:40.8
35	Catherine Bultez	France	13:42.8
36	Danuta Siemieniuk	Poland	13:43.8
37	Celina Magala	Poland	13:44
38	Irja Pettinen	Finland	13:45
39	Margaret Coomber	Scotland	13:50.4
40	Brenda Webb	United States	13:53.2
41	Christel Rosenthal	West Germany	13:53.4
42	Françoise Papelard	France	13:55
43	Moire O'Boyle	Scotland	13:57.4
44	Maria Steels	Belgium	13:58
45	Vicki Foltz	United States	14:01
46	Ann Cumming	Ireland	14:02
47	Waltraud Egger	Italy	14:03.6
48	Veronica Sherry	Ireland	14:05
49	Vera Kemper	West Germany	14:05.4
50	Begona Zuñiga	Spain	14:09.4
51	Françoise Nicolas	France	14:12.8
52	Montserrat Abello	Spain	14:13.1
53	Anne-Marie Saugnac	France	14:13.2
54	Bronwen Smith	Wales	14:13.4
55	Encarnación Escudero	Spain	14:13.6
56	Renate Kieninger	West Germany	14:13.8
57	Giovanna Leone	Italy	14:17.8
58	Sheelagh Morrissey	Ireland	14:20.2
59	Ewa Kuty	Poland	14:20.4
60	Jean Lochhead	Wales	14:20.6
61	Arlene Pursglove	Scotland	14:27
62	Pilar San Martin	Spain	14:36.4
63	Palm Gunstone	Scotland	14:54.2
64	Bernadette van Roy	Belgium	14:57.6
65	Marie Mellerick	Ireland	14:59.8
66	Delyth Davies	Wales	15:03
67	Ann Roblin	Wales	15:18.4
68	Ann Disley	Wales	15:20.4
69	Anna Klemenjak	Austria	17:00.2

==== Teams ====
Rank	Team	Points
1st place, gold medalist(s)	England: Rita Ridley / 3; Ann Yeoman / 4; Joyce Smith / 7; Carol Gould / 14; (Christine Tranter) / (15); (Glynis Goodburn) / (22)	28
2nd place, silver medalist(s)	Italy: Paola Cacchi / 1; Margherita Gargano / 10; Silvana Cruciata / 13; Bruna Lovisolo / 26; (Waltraud Egger) / (47); (Giovanna Leone) / (57)	50
3rd place, bronze medalist(s)	Finland: Nina Holmén / 2; Pirjo Vihonen / 5; Sinikka Tyynelä / 16; Irja Pettinen / 38	61
4	Belgium: Josee van Santberghe / 11; Marleen Mols / 17; Magda Versluys / 25; Maria Steels / 44; (Bernadette van Roy) / (64)	97
5	United States: Clara Choate / 12; Julie Brown / 27; Cheryl Bridges / 28; Katy McIntyre / 31; (Brenda Webb) / (40); (Vicki Foltz) / (45)	98
6	Poland: Bronislawa Ludwichowska / 6; Renata Pentlinowska / 24; Urszula Prasek / 32; Danuta Siemieniuk / 36; (Celina Magala) / (37); (Ewa Kuty) / (59)	98
7	West Germany: Christa Kofferschläger / 20; Charlotte Teske / 21; Christine Klemme / 34; Christel Rosenthal / 41; (Vera Kemper) / (49); (Renate Kieninger) / (56)	116
8	Scotland: Mary Stewart / 8; Christine Haskett / 33; Margaret Coomber / 39; Moire O'Boyle / 43; (Arlene Pursglove) / (61); (Palm Gunstone) / (63)	123
9	France: Joëlle De Brouwer / 18; Joëlle Audibert / 30; Catherine Bultez / 35; Françoise Papelard / 42; (Françoise Nicolas) / (51); (Anne-Marie Saugnac) / (53)	125
10	Spain: Carmen Valero / 9; Maria Paz de Lucas / 19; Begona Zuñiga / 50; Montserrat Abello / 52; (Encarnación Escudero) / (55); (Pilar San Martin) / (62)	130
11	Ireland: Deirdre Foreman / 23; Mary Lynch / 29; Ann Cumming / 46; Veronica Sherry / 48; (Sheelagh Morrissey) / (58); (Marie Mellerick) / (65)	146
12	Wales: Bronwen Smith / 54; Jean Lochhead / 60; Delyth Davies / 66; Ann Roblin / 67; (Ann Disley) / (68)	247

- Note: Athletes in parentheses did not score for the team result

== Participation ==
An unofficial count yields the participation of 69 athletes from 13 countries in the Senior women's race. This is in agreement with the official numbers as published.

- Austria (1)
- Belgium (5)
- England (6)
- Finland (4)
- France (6)
- Ireland (6)
- Italy (6)
- Poland (6)
- Scotland (6)
- Spain (6)
- United States (6)
- Wales (5)
- West Germany (6)

== See also ==
- 1974 IAAF World Cross Country Championships – Senior men's race
- 1974 IAAF World Cross Country Championships – Junior men's race
