= 1973 IAAF World Cross Country Championships – Senior women's race =

Senior women's race at the 1973 IAAF World Cross Country Championships
- Organisers: IAAF
- Edition: 1st
- Date: March 17
- Host city: Waregem, West Flanders, Belgium
- Venue: Hippodroom Waregem
- Events: 1
- Distances: 3.99 km – Senior women
- Participation: 75 athletes from 16 nations

The Senior women's race at the 1973 IAAF World Cross Country Championships was held in Waregem, Belgium, at the Hippodroom Waregem on March 17, 1973. A report on the event was given in the Glasgow Herald.

Complete results, medallists, and the results of British athletes were published.

== Race results ==
=== Senior women's race (3.99 km) ===
==== Individual ====
Rank	Athlete	Country	Time
1st place, gold medalist(s)	Paola Pigni	Italy	13:45.2
2nd place, silver medalist(s)	Joyce Smith	England	13:58
3rd place, bronze medalist(s)	Josee van Santberghe	Belgium	14:01
4	Rita Ridley	England	14:02
5	Sinikka Tyynelä	Finland	14:09
6	Jean Lochhead	Wales	14:12
7	Marijke Moser	Switzerland	14:13
8	Irja Pettinen	Finland	14:14
9	Anne Garrett	New Zealand	14:15
10	Nina Holmén	Finland	14:16
11	Annie van de Kerkhof	Netherlands	14:20
12	Marleen Mols	Belgium	14:21
13	Gabriella Dorio	Italy	14:22
14	Penny Yule	England	14:23
15	Doris Brown	United States	14:24
16	Francie Larrieu	United States	14:29
17	Mary Tracey	Ireland	14:30
18	Christel Rosenthal	West Germany	14:32
19	Margaret Coomber	Scotland	14:34
20	Carol Gould	England	14:35
21	Christa Kofferschläger	West Germany	
22	Deirdre Foreman	Ireland	
23	Barbara Banks	England	
24	Valerie Robinson	New Zealand	
25	Carmen Valero	Spain	
26	Manuela Preuss	West Germany	
27	Christine Haskett	Scotland	
28	Heather Thomson	New Zealand	
29	Vicki Foltz	United States	
30	Caroline Walker	United States	
31	Mary Lynch	Ireland	
32	Valerie Eberley	United States	
33	Yolande Roche	France	
34	Gerda Ranz	West Germany	
35	Belen Azpeitia	Spain	
36	Giuseppina Torello	Italy	
37	Norine Braithwaite	England	
38	Ann Barrass	Scotland	
39	Liève van den Broeck	Belgium	
40	Katy McIntyre	United States	
41	Joëlle Audibert	France	
42	Liduina Melchers	New Zealand	
43	Moire O'Boyle	Scotland	
44	Millie Sampson	New Zealand	
45	Jane McNicholl	Ireland	
46	Bruna Lovisolo	Italy	
47	Margherita Gargano	Italy	
48	Thelwyn Bateman	Wales	
49	Marie-José Phyllis	France	
50	Aila Koivistoinen	Finland	
51	Corry Konings	Netherlands	
52	Marie Buckley	Ireland	
53	Geertje Meersseman	Belgium	
54	Sylvia Schenk	West Germany	
55	Bronwen Smith	Wales	
56	Magda Versluys	Belgium	
57	Ria Groen	Netherlands	
58	Delyth Davies	Wales	
59	Ann Cumming	Ireland	
60	Françoise Nicolas	France	
61	Mary Chambers	Scotland	
62	Viviane van Emelen	Belgium	
63	Gail Finlay	New Zealand	
64	Pilar San Martin	Spain	
65	Blanche Meliarene	France	
66	Marion Hepworth	Wales	
67	Yvonne Herisson	France	
68	Begona Zuñiga	Spain	
69	Montserrat Abello	Spain	
70	Gloria Dourass	Wales	
71	Consuelo Alonso	Spain	
72	Pamela Reece	Northern Ireland	
73	Paula Molesky	Canada	
74	Palm Gunstone	Scotland	
–	Joke van de Stelt	Netherlands	DNF

==== Teams ====
Rank	Team	Points
1st place, gold medalist(s)	England: Joyce Smith / 2; Rita Ridley / 4; Penny Yule / 14; Carol Gould / 20; (Barbara Banks) / (23); (Norine Braithwaite) / (37)	40
2nd place, silver medalist(s)	Finland: Sinikka Tyynelä / 5; Irja Pettinen / 8; Nina Holmén / 10; Aila Koivistoinen / 50	73
3rd place, bronze medalist(s)	United States: Doris Brown / 15; Francie Larrieu / 16; Vicki Foltz / 29; Caroline Walker / 30; (Valerie Eberley) / (32); (Katy McIntyre) / (40)	90
4	Italy: Paola Pigni / 1; Gabriella Dorio / 13; Giuseppina Torello / 36; Bruna Lovisolo / 46; (Margherita Gargano) / (47)	96
5	West Germany: Christel Rosenthal / 18; Christa Kofferschläger / 21; Manuela Preuss / 26; Gerda Ranz / 34; (Sylvia Schenk) / (54)	99
6	New Zealand: Anne Garrett / 9; Valerie Robinson / 24; Heather Thomson / 28; Liduina Melchers / 42; (Millie Sampson) / (44); (Gail Finlay) / (63)	103
7	Belgium: Josee van Santberghe / 3; Marleen Mols / 12; Liève van den Broeck / 39; Geertje Meersseman / 53; (Magda Versluys) / (56); (Viviane van Emelen) / (62)	107
8	Ireland: Mary Tracey / 17; Deirdre Foreman / 22; Mary Lynch / 31; Jane McNicholl / 45; (Marie Buckley) / (52); (Ann Cumming) / (59)	115
9	Scotland: Margaret Coomber / 19; Christine Haskett / 27; Ann Barrass / 38; Moire O'Boyle / 43; (Mary Chambers) / (61); (Palm Gunstone) / (74)	127
10	Wales: Jean Lochhead / 6; Thelwyn Bateman / 48; Bronwen Smith / 55; Delyth Davies / 58; (Marion Hepworth) / (66); (Gloria Dourass) / (70)	167
11	France: Yolande Roche / 33; Joëlle Audibert / 41; Marie-José Phyllis / 49; Françoise Nicolas / 60; (Blanche Meliarene) / (65); (Yvonne Herisson) / (67)	183
12	Spain: Carmen Valero / 25; Belen Azpeitia / 35; Pilar San Martin / 64; Begona Zuñiga / 68; (Montserrat Abello) / (69); (Consuelo Alonso) / (71)	192
DNF	Netherlands: (Annie van den Kerkhof) / (11); (Corry Konings) / (51); (Ria Groen) / (57); (Joke van de Stelt) / (DNF)	DNF

- Note: Athletes in parentheses did not score for the team result

== Participation ==
An unofficial count yields the participation of 75 athletes from 16 countries in the Senior women's race. This is in agreement with the official numbers as published.

- Belgium (6)
- Canada (1)
- England (6)
- Finland (4)
- France (6)
- Ireland (6)
- Italy (5)
- Netherlands (4)
- New Zealand (6)
- Northern Ireland (1)
- Scotland (6)
- Spain (6)
- Switzerland (1)
- United States (6)
- Wales (6)
- West Germany (5)

== See also ==
- 1973 IAAF World Cross Country Championships – Senior men's race
- 1973 IAAF World Cross Country Championships – Junior men's race
