= 1974 IAAF World Cross Country Championships – Junior men's race =

Junior men's race at the 1974 IAAF World Cross Country Championships
- Organisers: IAAF
- Edition: 2nd
- Date: March 16
- Host city: Monza, Lombardia, Italy
- Venue: Mirabello Racecourse
- Events: 1
- Distances: 7.1 km – Junior men
- Participation: 75 athletes from 14 nations

The Junior men's race at the 1974 IAAF World Cross Country Championships was held in Monza, Italy, at the Mirabello Racecourse on March 16, 1974. A report on the event was given in the Glasgow Herald.

Complete results, medallists, and the results of British athletes were published.

== Race results ==
=== Junior men's race (7.1 km) ===
==== Individual ====
Rank	Athlete	Country	Time
1st place, gold medalist(s)	Rich Kimball	United States	21:30.8
2nd place, silver medalist(s)	Venanzio Ortis	Italy	21:33
3rd place, bronze medalist(s)	John Treacy	Ireland	21:42.4
4	Dietmar Millonig	Austria	21:48
5	Matt Centrowitz	United States	21:48
6	John Roscoe	United States	21:52.2
7	Bouchaib Zouhri	Morocco	21:54.2
8	Mohamed Naoumi	Morocco	21:55.2
9	Rudi Schoofs	Belgium	21:56.4
10	Pat Davey	United States	21:58.2
11	Guy Bourban	France	21:59
12	William Sheridan	Scotland	22:00.2
13	Paul Kenney	Scotland	22:00.6
14	Peter Gebhardt	West Germany	22:01.6
15	Mike Pinocci	United States	22:02.6
16	Cándido Alario	Spain	22:05.7
17	Markus Ryffel	Switzerland	22:08.4
18	J.J. Griffin	United States	22:09.8
19	Nat Muir	Scotland	22:11.6
20	Dirk Geens	Belgium	22:14.8
21	Hamadi Massoudi	Morocco	22:15
22	Yahia Hadka	Morocco	22:16
23	Derek Carroll	Ireland	22:16.2
24	Giuseppe Gerbi	Italy	22:20
25	Stefano La Sala	Italy	22:21.2
26	Jean-Claude Dessort	Belgium	22:22.8
27	Gerry Deegan	Ireland	22:23.8
28	Stefan Grossenbacher	Switzerland	22:25
29	Jeremy Odlin	England	22:31
30	Georges Bresson	France	22:32.2
31	Karl Fleschen	West Germany	22:33.2
32	Jaime López	Spain	22:34.4
33	Antonio Fernández	Spain	22:35
34	Luc Mallet	France	22:39.4
35	Ulrich Betz	West Germany	22:40
36	Hugh Elliott	England	22:41
37	Bernhard Vifian	Switzerland	22:42.2
38	Heiner Hansen	West Germany	22:42.6
39	Salvatore Anzà	Italy	22:43.2
40	Ahmed Sennaji	Morocco	22:43.6
41	Martin Bishop	England	22:44
42	Gerry Redmond	Ireland	22:44.2
43	Giancarlo Garattini	Italy	22:45
44	Peter McGouren	Northern Ireland	22:45.6
45	Jean-Paul Ballouard	France	22:51.4
46	Yannick Fayot	France	22:51.6
47	Patrick de Groote	Belgium	22:52.6
48	Manuel Perez	Spain	22:57
49	John Graham	Scotland	22:57.4
50	Bruno Lafranchi	Switzerland	22:57.6
51	Vicente de la Parte	Spain	23:02.8
52	José Gil Ramperez	Spain	23:06.4
53	Frank Brown	Scotland	23:11.6
54	Denis Ramanich	France	23:12.8
55	Eddie Hartnett	Ireland	23:13.2
56	Martin Preuschl	Austria	23:14.8
57	James Lawson	Scotland	23:16.4
58	Hugo Ceulemans	Belgium	23:17.6
59	Michael Best	Northern Ireland	23:18.8
60	Tony Ryan	Ireland	23:20.8
61	Gerry Price	Northern Ireland	23:22.4
62	Robert Manz	West Germany	23:29.6
63	Bruno Kuhn	Switzerland	23:32.6
64	Andrew Barnett	England	23:44.4
65	Matteo Lo Russo	Italy	23:47.8
66	Peter Gaelli	Switzerland	24:08.2
67	Alan Harding	England	24:09.4
68	Julian van Honbeek	Belgium	24:29
69	Jim McKee	Northern Ireland	24:45.2
70	Khaled Kazem	Kuwait	24:45.4
71	Hamzih Al-Khetat	Kuwait	25:38.6
72	Ahmed Al-Saie	Kuwait	25:38.6
73	Ramian Al-Khamees	Kuwait	25:55.6
74	Saad Bander Al-Shaejee	Kuwait	26:00.2
75	Johar Mubarak Al-Marzoo	Kuwait	26:00.6

==== Teams ====
Rank	Team	Points
1st place, gold medalist(s)	United States: Rich Kimball / 1; Matt Centrowitz / 5; John Roscoe / 6; Pat Davey / 10; (Mike Pinocci) / (15); (J.J. Griffin) / (18)	22
2nd place, silver medalist(s)	Morocco: Bouchaib Zouhri / 7; Mohamed Naoumi / 8; Hamadi Massoudi / 21; Yahia Hadka / 22; (Ahmed Sennaji) / (40)	58
3rd place, bronze medalist(s)	Italy: Venanzio Ortis / 2; Giuseppe Gerbi / 24; Stefano La Sala / 25; Salvatore Anzà / 39; (Giancarlo Garattini) / (43); (Matteo Lo Russo) / (65)	90
4	Scotland: William Sheridan / 12; Paul Kenney / 13; Nat Muir / 19; John Graham / 49; (Frank Brown) / (53); (James Lawson) / (57)	93
5	Ireland: John Treacy / 3; Derek Carroll / 23; Gerry Deegan / 27; Gerry Redmond / 42; (Eddie Hartnett) / (55); (Tony Ryan) / (60)	95
6	Belgium: Rudi Schoofs / 9; Dirk Geens / 20; Jean-Claude Dessort / 26; Patrick de Groote / 47; (Hugo Ceulemans) / (58); (Julian van Honbeek) / (68)	102
7	West Germany: Peter Gebhardt / 14; Karl Fleschen / 31; Ulrich Betz / 35; Heiner Hansen / 38; (Robert Manz) / (62)	118
8	France: Guy Bourban / 11; Georges Bresson / 30; Luc Mallet / 34; Jean-Paul Ballouard / 45; (Yannick Fayot) / (46); (Denis Ramanich) / (54)	120
9	Spain: Cándido Alario / 16; Jaime López / 32; Antonio Fernández / 33; Manuel Perez / 48; (Vicente de la Parte) / (51); (José Gil Ramperez) / (52)	129
10	Switzerland: Markus Ryffel / 17; Stefan Grossenbacher / 28; Bernhard Vifian / 37; Bruno Lafranchi / 50; (Bruno Kuhn) / (63); (Peter Gaelli) / (66)	132
11	England: Jeremy Odlin / 29; Hugh Elliott / 36; Martin Bishop / 41; Andrew Barnett / 64; (Alan Harding) / (67)	170
12	Northern Ireland: Peter McGouren / 44; Michael Best / 59; Gerry Price / 61; Jim McKee / 69	233
13	Kuwait: Khaled Kazem / 70; Hamzih Al-Khetat / 71; Ahmed Al-Saie / 72; Ramian Al-Khamees / 73; (Saad Bander Al-Shaejee) / (74); (Johar Mubarak Al-Marzoo) / (75)	286

- Note: Athletes in parentheses did not score for the team result

== Participation ==
An unofficial count yields the participation of 75 athletes from 14 countries in the Junior men's race. This is in agreement with the official numbers as published.

- Austria (2)
- Belgium (6)
- England (5)
- France (6)
- Ireland (6)
- Italy (6)
- Kuwait (6)
- Morocco (5)
- Northern Ireland (4)
- Scotland (6)
- Spain (6)
- Switzerland (6)
- United States (6)
- West Germany (5)

== See also ==
- 1974 IAAF World Cross Country Championships – Senior men's race
- 1974 IAAF World Cross Country Championships – Senior women's race
