= Vaes =

Vaes or VAES may refer to:

- Wouter Vaes, a Dutch professional darts player
- Stefaan Vaes, a Belgian mathematician
- Achiel Vaes, a Belgian long-distance runner
- VAES (instructions), vector AES instructions
