= Ian Gilmour (disambiguation) =

Ian Gilmour (1926–2007) was a Conservative politician in the United Kingdom.

Ian Gilmour may also refer to:

- Ian Gilmour (actor), New Zealand-born actor
- Ian Gilmour (athlete), of the 1971 International Cross Country Championships
- Ian Gilmour, a British professional wrestler

== See also ==
- Ian Gilmore (born 1947), professor of hepatology
