= Ann Ford (athlete) =

English middle and long-distance runner

Ann Ford née Yeoman
Personal information
- Nationality: British (English)
- Born: 30 March 1952 (age 74) Ealing, London, England

Sport
- Sport: Athletics
- Event: middle-distance
- Club: Feltham Athletic Club
Medal record
Representing Great Britain
Women's Athletics
World Cross Country Championships
Gold medal – first place	1974 Monza	Team
Bronze medal – third place	1979 Limerick	Team
Bronze medal – third place	1982 Rome	Team
Representing England
Commonwealth Games
Bronze medal – third place	1978 Edmonton	3000 m

Ann Ford (née Yeoman; born 30 March 1952) is an English former middle and long-distance runner.

== Biography ==
Yeoman and her twin sister Paula Yeoman were born in Ealing in 1952. Ann finished third behind Inger Knutsson in the 3,000 metres event at the 1973 WAAA Championships.

Ann and her sister Paula finished 2nd and 3rd respectively behind Joyce Smith in the 3000 metres at the 1974 WAAA Championships.

Ann Yeoman married Bernard Ford during 1975 and competed under her married name thereafter.

She finished in the top ten at five IAAF World Cross Country Championships, including fourth-place finishes in 1974 and 1976. Ford also won a World Cross Country Championship team gold medal in 1974 and a bronze medal in 1979 and 1982. She was also a team winner at the International Cross Country Championships in 1972.

In 1978, Ford won a bronze medal in the 3000 metres at the Commonwealth Games, in a race won by her twin sister Paula. At the 1988 London Marathon, she finished second to Ingrid Kristiansen, running a personal best time of 2:30:38, to earn selection for the Seoul Olympics. She withdrew from the Olympic team in August 1988 due to injury.

On the road running circuit, she was the 1986 winner of the Reading Half Marathon, the Fleet Half Marathon winner in 1985 and 1988, and won the Nottingham Half Marathon in 1993 and 1997.

== International competitions ==
Year	Competition	Venue	Position	Event	Notes
Representing Great Britain / England
1972	International Cross Country Championships	Cambridge, United Kingdom	11th	Senior race	16:49
1972	International Cross Country Championships	Cambridge, United Kingdom	1st	Senior team	22 pts
1974	World Cross Country Championships	Monza, Italy	4th	4 km	12:58
1974	World Cross Country Championships	Monza, Italy	1st	Senior team	28 pts
1974	European Championships	Prague, Czechoslovakia	7th	3000 m	9:06.89
1975	World Cross Country Championships	Rabat, Morocco	7th	4.2 km	14:03
1975	World Cross Country Championships	Rabat, Morocco	4th	Senior team	64 pts
1976	World Cross Country Championships	Chepstow, United Kingdom	4th	4.8 km	16.57
1976	World Cross Country Championships	Chepstow, United Kingdom	4th	Senior team	78
1977	World Cross Country Championships	Düsseldorf, Germany	7th	5.1 km	17:47
1977	World Cross Country Championships	Düsseldorf, Germany	5th	Senior team	118 pts
1978	Commonwealth Games	Edmonton, Canada	3rd	3000 m	9:24.05
1978	European Championships	Prague, Czechoslovakia	9th	3000 m	8:53.08
1979	World Cross Country Championships	Limerick, Ireland	9th	5.0 km	17:47
1979	World Cross Country Championships	Limerick, Ireland	3rd	Senior team	68 pts
1982	World Cross Country Championships	Rome, Italy	13th	4.7 km	15:02
1982	World Cross Country Championships	Rome, Italy	3rd	Senior team	67 pts

== Marathons ==
Year	Competition	Venue	Position	Event	Notes
1985	Columbus Marathon	Columbus, United States	2nd	—	2:36:15
1986	London Marathon	London, United Kingdom	3rd	—	2:31:40
1988	London Marathon	London, United Kingdom	2nd	—	2:30:38

== National titles ==
- English Cross Country Championships
  - Senior race: 1976
- AAA Marathon Championships
  - Senior race: 1986, 1988
- England Athletics Championships
  - 3000 m: 1972

== See also ==
- List of Commonwealth Games medallists in athletics (women)
