= 1974 European Athletics Championships – Women's 3000 metres =

Women's 3000 metres at the European Athletics Championships

The women's 3000 metres at the 1974 European Athletics Championships was held in Rome, Italy, at Stadio Olimpico on 2 September 1974.

== Medalists ==
| Gold | Nina Holmén; Finland |
| Silver | Lyudmila Bragina; Soviet Union |
| Bronze | Joyce Smith; Great Britain |

== Results ==
=== Final ===
2 September

| Rank | Name | Nationality | Time | Notes |
|---|---|---|---|---|
| 1st place, gold medalist(s) | Nina Holmén | Finland | 8:55.10 | CR NR |
| 2nd place, silver medalist(s) | Lyudmila Bragina | Soviet Union | 8:56.09 | |
| 3rd place, bronze medalist(s) | Joyce Smith | Great Britain | 8:57.39 | |
| 4 | Natalia Mărăşescu | Romania | 8:58.95 | NR |
| 5 | Paola Pigni | Italy | 9:01.40 | |
| 6 | Bronisława Ludwichowska | Poland | 9:05.14 | NR |
| 7 | Ann Ford | Great Britain | 9:06.89 | |
| 8 | Tamara Pangelova | Soviet Union | 9:10.56 | |
| 9 | Irina Bondarchuk | Soviet Union | 9:16.6 | |
| 10 | Renata Pentlinowska | Poland | 9:22.8 | |
| 11 | Eva Gustafsson | Sweden | 9:24.2 | |
| 12 | Rumyana Chavdarova | Bulgaria | 9:31.0 | |
| 13 | Sonja Castelein | Belgium | 9:31.2 | |
| 14 | Marijke Moser | Switzerland | 9:32.8 | |
| 15 | Carmen Valero | Spain | 9:35.4 | |
| 16 | Urszula Prasek | Poland | 9:48.4 | |
| | Gudrun Hoday | West Germany | DNF | |
| | Ülker Atlı-Kutlu | Turkey | DNS | |

== Participation ==
According to an unofficial count, 17 athletes from 12 countries participated in the event.

- Belgium (1)
- Bulgaria (1)
- Finland (1)
- Italy (1)
- Poland (3)
- Romania (1)
- Soviet Union (3)
- Spain (1)
- Sweden (1)
- Switzerland (1)
- Great Britain (2)
- West Germany (1)
