= Franco Veronese =

Italian long-distance runner

Personal information
- Full name: Francesco Veronese
- Nationality: Italian
- Born: 6 February 1952 (age 74)

Sport
- Country: Italy
- Sport: Athletics
- Event: Long-distance running
Medal record
International Cross Country C'ships
Bronze medal – third place	1970 Vichy	Junior Team

Franco Veronese (born 6 February 1952) is a former Italian male long-distance runner who competed at one edition of the IAAF World Cross Country Championships at senior level (1973).
