= Thelma Wright =

Canadian middle-distance runner

Thelma Wright née Fynn
Personal information
- Nationality: Canadian
- Born: 9 October 1951 (age 74) Eastbourne, England
- Height: 153 cm (5 ft 0 in)
- Weight: 48 kg (106 lb)

Sport
- Sport: Middle-distance running
- Event(s): 1500 metres, 3000 metres, cross country
- Club: UBC Thunderbirds
Medal record
Representing Canada
Commonwealth Games
Bronze medal – third place	1970 Edinburgh	1500m
Bronze medal – third place	1974 Christchurch	1500m
Pan American Games
Silver medal – second place	1975 Mexico City	1500m
Summer Universiade
Silver medal – second place	1975 Rome	1500m

Thelma Sonia Wright (née Fynn; born 9 October 1951) is a Canadian middle-distance runner. She competed in the 1500 metres at the 1972 Summer Olympics and the 1976 Summer Olympics.

== Biography ==
In 1970, Wright won a bronze medal at the World Cross Country Championships in France, and a bronze at the Commonwealth Games in Edinburgh at 1500 metres.

In 1973, she won another bronze medal at the 1973 Pacific Conference Games in Toronto, in the 1500 metres, as well as at the Commonwealth Games in 1974, over the same distance. Later thay year in July 1974, Wright finished second behind Grete Andersen in the 1500 metres event at the British 1974 WAAA Championships.

In 1975, she won a silver medal in the 3000 metres at the World Student Games in Rome, setting a Canadian Record of 8:54.94, which would ranked her 5th for the year. She would also win a silver medal in the 1500 metres at the Pan Am Games in Mexico City, 1975. She would also win seven Canadian Cross Country Championships during the 1970s. Wright also had two 4th-place finishes in the 1500 metres at the World Students Games in Moscow in 1973, and Rome 1975.
