= Joske Van Santberghe =

Belgian athletics competitor

Medal record

Women's athletics

Representing Belgium

IAAF World Cross Country Championships
Bronze medal – third place	1973 Waregem	Senior race

Joske Van Santberghe (born 8 August 1949) is a Belgian middle- and long-distance runner.

She competed mainly in cross country running and was bronze medallist at the 1973 IAAF World Cross Country Championships, held on home turf in Waregem. Van Santberghe represented Belgium for five straight years across the International Cross Country Championships and the IAAF World Cross Country Championships, from 1970 to 1974.

During her career she was a member of Daring Club Leuven athletics club and claimed five national titles, four in cross country and one in the 1500 metres.

In 1972 she married fellow Belgian world cross country medallist Eric De Beck.

== International competitions ==
Year	Competition	Venue	Position	Event	Notes
1970	International Cross Country Championships	Vichy, France	14th	Senior race	11:26
1970	International Cross Country Championships	Vichy, France	5th	Senior team	69 pts
1971	International Cross Country Championships	San Sebastián, Spain	55th	Senior race	12:49
1971	International Cross Country Championships	San Sebastián, Spain	10th	Senior team	190 pts
1972	International Cross Country Championships	Cambridge, United Kingdom	4th	Senior race	16:20
1972	International Cross Country Championships	Cambridge, United Kingdom	7th	Senior team	100 pts
1973	World Cross Country Championships	Waregem, Belgium	3rd	Senior race	14:01
1973	World Cross Country Championships	Waregem, Belgium	7th	Senior team	107 pts
1974	World Cross Country Championships	Monza, Italy	11th	Senior race	13:18.6
1974	World Cross Country Championships	Monza, Italy	4th	Senior team	97 pts

== National titles ==
- Belgian Athletics Championships
  - 1500 metres: 1971
- Belgian Cross Country Championships
  - Long course: 1971, 1972, 1973, 1974
