= 1974 IAAF World Cross Country Championships =

- Organisers: IAAF
- Edition: 2nd
- Date: 16 March
- Host city: Monza, Lombardia, Italy
- Venue: Mirabello Racecourse
- Events: 3
- Distances: 12 km – Senior men 7 km – Junior men 4 km – Senior women
- Participation: 269 athletes from 23 nations

The 1974 IAAF World Cross Country Championships was held in Monza, Italy, at the Mirabello Racecourse on 16 March 1974. A report on the event was given in the Glasgow Herald.

Complete results for men, junior men, women, medallists, and the results of British athletes were published.

== Medallists ==
Event	Gold		Silver		Bronze	
Individual
Senior men (12 km)	Eric De Beck; Belgium	35:23.8	Mariano Haro; Spain	35:24.6	Karel Lismont; Belgium	35:26.6
Junior men (7 km)	Rich Kimball; United States	21:30.8	Venanzio Ortis; Italy	21:33	John Treacy; Ireland	21:42.4
Senior women (4 km)	Paola Pigni; Italy	12:42	Nina Holmén; Finland	12:47.6	Rita Ridley; England	12:54
Team
Senior men	Belgium	103	England	109	France	215
Junior men	United States	22	Morocco	58	Italy	90
Senior women	England	28	Italy	50	Finland	61

== Race results ==
=== Senior men's race (12 km) ===
==== Individual ====
Rank	Athlete	Country	Time
1st place, gold medalist(s)	Eric De Beck	Belgium	35:23.8
2nd place, silver medalist(s)	Mariano Haro	Spain	35:24.6
3rd place, bronze medalist(s)	Karel Lismont	Belgium	35:26.6
4	Jim Brown	Scotland	35:29.2
5	Detlef Uhlemann	West Germany	35:30.4
6	Wilfried Scholz	East Germany	35:31.8
7	Ray Smedley	England	35:35.8
8	Noel Tijou	France	35:36.4
9	David Black	England	35:37.2
10	Franco Fava	Italy	35:38.4
11	Bernie Ford	England	35:48.4
12	Manfred Kuschmann	East Germany	35:54.2
Full results

==== Team ====
Rank	Team	Points
1st place, gold medalist(s)	Belgium: Eric De Beck / 1; Karel Lismont / 3; Marc Smet / 13; Gaston Roelants / 14; Frank Grillaert / 27; Erik Gijselinck / 45; (Achille Vaes) / (50); (Hendrik Schoofs) / (75)	103
2nd place, silver medalist(s)	England: Ray Smedley / 7; David Black / 9; Bernie Ford / 11; Grenville Tuck / 16; Frank Briscoe / 30; Mike Beevor / 36; (Mike Tagg) / (40); (Robert Patterson) / (69); (Peter Standing) / (94)	109
3rd place, bronze medalist(s)	France: Noel Tijou / 8; Lucien Rault / 20; Pierre Liardet / 38; Jean-Jacques Prianon / 39; René Jourdan / 49; Jean-Paul Gomez / 61; (André Gloaguen) / (83); (François Lacour) / (85); (Jean Jacques Boiroux) / (87)	215
4	West Germany	220
5	East Germany	226
6	Spain	269
7	Scotland	273
8	Italy	278
Full results

- Note: Athletes in parentheses did not score for the team result

=== Junior men's race (7 km) ===
==== Individual ====
Rank	Athlete	Country	Time
1st place, gold medalist(s)	Rich Kimball	United States	21:30.8
2nd place, silver medalist(s)	Venanzio Ortis	Italy	21:33
3rd place, bronze medalist(s)	John Treacy	Ireland	21:42.4
4	Dietmar Millonig	Austria	21:48
5	Matt Centrowitz	United States	21:48
6	John Roscoe	United States	21:52.2
7	Bouchaib Zouhri	Morocco	21:54.2
8	Mohamed Naoumi	Morocco	21:55.2
9	Rudi Schoofs	Belgium	21:56.4
10	Pat Davey	United States	21:58.2
11	Guy Bourban	France	21:59
12	William Sheridan	Scotland	22:00.2
Full results

==== Team ====
Rank	Team	Points
1st place, gold medalist(s)	United States: Rich Kimball / 1; Matt Centrowitz / 5; John Roscoe / 6; Pat Davey / 10; (Mike Pinocci) / (15); (J.J. Griffin) / (18)	22
2nd place, silver medalist(s)	Morocco: Bouchaib Zouhri / 7; Mohamed Naoumi / 8; Hamadi Massoudi / 21; Yahia Hadka / 22; (Ahmed Sennaji) / (40)	58
3rd place, bronze medalist(s)	Italy: Venanzio Ortis / 2; Giuseppe Gerbi / 24; Stefano La Sala / 25; Salvatore Anzà / 39; (Giancarlo Garattini) / (43); (Matteo Lo Russo) / (65)	90
4	Scotland	93
5	Ireland	95
6	Belgium	102
7	West Germany	118
8	France	120
Full results

- Note: Athletes in parentheses did not score for the team result

=== Senior women's race (4 km) ===
Individual race
Rank	Athlete	Country	Time
1st place, gold medalist(s)	Paola Pigni	Italy	12:42
2nd place, silver medalist(s)	Nina Holmén	Finland	12:47.6
3rd place, bronze medalist(s)	Rita Ridley	England	12:54
4	Ann Yeoman	England	12:58.6
5	Pirjo Vihonen	Finland	13:02
6	Bronislawa Ludwichowska	Poland	13:03.2
7	Joyce Smith	England	13:04.4
8	Mary Stewart	Scotland	13:05.6
9	Carmen Valero	Spain	13:13.4
10	Margherita Gargano	Italy	13:14.8
11	Josee van Santberghe	Belgium	13:18.6
12	Clara Choate	United States	13:20.8
Full results

Teams
Rank	Team	Points
1st place, gold medalist(s)	England: Rita Ridley / 3; Ann Yeoman / 4; Joyce Smith / 7; Carol Gould / 14; (Christine Tranter) / (15); (Glynis Goodburn) / (22)	28
2nd place, silver medalist(s)	Italy: Paola Pigni / 1; Margherita Gargano / 10; Silvana Cruciata / 13; Bruna Lovisolo / 26; (Waltraud Egger) / (47); (Giovanna Leone) / (57)	50
3rd place, bronze medalist(s)	Finland: Nina Holmén / 2; Pirjo Vihonen / 5; Sinikka Tyynelä / 16; Irja Pettinen / 38	61
4	Belgium	97
5	United States	98
6	Poland	98
7	West Germany	116
8	Scotland	123
Full results

- Note: Athletes in parentheses did not score for the team result

== Medal table (unofficial) ==
* Host nation (Italy)

Rank	Nation	Gold	Silver	Bronze	Total
1	Belgium	2	0	1	3
2	United States	2	0	0	2
3	Italy*	1	2	1	4
4	England	1	1	1	3
5	Finland	0	1	1	2
6	Morocco	0	1	0	1
6	Spain	0	1	0	1
8	France	0	0	1	1
8	Ireland	0	0	1	1
Totals (9 entries)		6	6	6	18

- Note: Totals include both individual and team medals, with medals in the team competition counting as one medal.

== Participation ==
An unofficial count yields the participation of 269 athletes from 23 countries.

- Austria (4)
- Belgium (19)
- Denmark (1)
- East Germany (6)
- England (20)
- Finland (10)
- France (21)
- Ireland (20)
- Italy (21)
- Kuwait (6)
- Morocco (14)
- Netherlands (7)
- Northern Ireland (10)
- Norway (3)
- Poland (6)
- Scotland (21)
- Spain (21)
- Sweden (3)
- Switzerland (6)
- Tunisia (6)
- United States (12)
- Wales (13)
- West Germany (19)

== See also ==
- 1974 IAAF World Cross Country Championships – Senior men's race
- 1974 IAAF World Cross Country Championships – Junior men's race
- 1974 IAAF World Cross Country Championships – Senior women's race
- 1974 in athletics (track and field)
