= Barbara Banks =

English long-distance runner (1947–2025)

- Banks in 1969

Personal information
- Born: 27 July 1947
- Died: 28 November 2025 (aged 78)

Sport
- Country: England
- Sport: Athletics
- Event: Cross country running

Achievements and titles
- Personal bests: 800 m: 2:17.7 (1969); 3000 m: 9:54 (1969)
Medal record
Women's athletics
Representing England
World Cross Country Championships
Gold medal – first place	1973 Waregem	Senior team
International Cross Country Championships
Gold medal – first place	1970 Frederick	Women's team

Barbara Majumdar (née Banks; 27 July 1947 – 28 November 2025) was an English long-distance runner, computer programmer, and orienteer. She held the 3000 metres world record and was the team gold medalist in the women's race at the 1973 World Cross Country Championships.

Following her 1973 gold medal, she married Budha Majumdar and changed her name, continuing to compete in athletics. Majumdar later took up orienteering and competed in dozens of orienteering events throughout the 2020s. She died in 2025.

== Career ==
Banks had her breakthrough to win the final English Women's Northern League cross country circuit race of the 1967-68 season, though she had been running for several years prior. She was runner-up at the following English Northern Counties Cross Country Championships and 20th at the English National Cross Country Championships.

In the summer of 1968, Banks won a 3000 metres track race in a time of 10:06.2 minutes. The time was considered a women's world record as Roberta Picco's 9:44.0 mark from 1966 was set en-route to a longer distance. She was awarded Wallasey's 1968 Sports Personality of the Year, winning the Ernest Maples Trophy.

Banks improved her English 3000 m record to 9:54 minutes at the 1969 WAAA Championships, finishing runner-up behind Ireland's Ann O'Brien. When asked of her 3000 m record, Banks said it "was not worth anything" given the lack of women running long distances at that time. She won the 1969 Northern Women's League cross country race at Witton Country Park despite a shoulder roll in her running economy said to waste energy. By the end of 1969, Banks was described as "on the fringe of international distinction".

Banks won the 1970 Northern Women's cross country championships as predicted by analysts. At the 1970 WAAA Championships, Banks finished third in the 3000 m. She was named as a potential athlete for England at the 1970 British Commonwealth Games, but she did not ultimately compete. She finished fourth at the 1970 English National Cross Country Championships. At the 'alternate' 1970 International Cross Country Championships in Frederick, Maryland, Banks finished fourth overall and was the second scorer on the winning English team.

Banks finished sixth at the 1973 English National Cross Country Championships, qualifying her to represent England at the inaugural 1973 IAAF World Cross Country Championships. At the 1973 World Championships, Banks finished 23rd, below expectations but still enough to contribute to her team's gold medal finish. As Barbara Majumdar, she won the inaugural Merseyside Women's County Association cross country championships in 1974. She also won the 1975 Merseyside county cross country championships.

== Personal life ==
Banks was born on 27 July 1947. She attended Maris Stella High School in New Brighton, Merseyside, and completed her General Certificate of Education in 1963. In 1968, she traveled to the Mexico City Summer Olympics where she watched Bob Beamon's world record long jump. She belonged to the Wallasey Athletic Club in Wallasey, Metropolitan Borough of Wirral, Merseyside, England and was coached by Carl Gee. She ran every day but did not keep a training log or routine. In 1967, Banks was found to be anemic and began taking iron supplements. They resulted in a ten-second improvement in her half-mile best. Banks was an early computer programmer. She would run after work or whenever her career allowed her to.

In between the 1970 and 1973 world cross country championships, Banks lived in India for six months. Following her 1973 world cross country gold medal, she married Budha Majumdar, a merchant navy officer, in India. Following her marriage, she adopted the name Barbara Majumdar (also spelled Majundar). She lived in Wokingham, Berkshire, in the 1980s and 1990s and had four children. One of her children, Shelley King, was featured on Good Morning with Anne and Nick in 1993 to discuss a near-death experience with carbon monoxide poisoning. Majumdar was the supervisor of a Wokingham playgroup in the 1990s.

Later in life, she participated in orienteering and represented England in orienteering internationally. She competed in dozens of orienteering events representing Deeside Orienteering Club, most recently on 18 May 2024. On 28 November 2025, Majumdar died due to a sudden illness.
