= Martti Kiilholma =

Finnish long-distance runner

Martti Kiilholma (born 3 June 1950) is a Finnish former long-distance runner who held national records in the 5,000 metres, 10,000 metres, and 20,000 metres. He won the inaugural California International Marathon in 1983.

== Achievements ==
Year	Competition	Venue	Position	Notes
Representing Finland
1983	California International Marathon	California State Capitol, United States	1st	Marathon
