= Gerry Redmond =

English rugby union player (1943–2025)

- Full name: Gerald Francis Redmond
- Born: 23 March 1943 Weston-super-Mare, England
- Died: 1 June 2025 (aged 82) Weston-super-Mar, England
- University: Cambridge

Rugby union career
- Position: No. 8
International career
Years	Team	Apps	(Points)
1970	England	1	(0)

Gerald Francis Redmond (23 March 1943 – 1 June 2025) was an English rugby union international.

== Biography ==
Redmond was born and raised in Weston-super-Mare, Somerset. He attended Weston Grammar School, where he played rugby under the guidance of ex-Wales international Willie Davies and developed into a specialist number eight.

A Cambridge University blue, Redmond was selected by England during his varsity career and was capped once, against France at Colombes in the 1970 Five Nations. He also played for Weston, Bristol and Somerset.

Redmond died on 1 June 2025, at the age of 82.

== See also ==
- List of England national rugby union players
