= Gaetano Pusterla =

Italian long-distance runner

Personal information
- Nationality: Italian
- Born: 20 October 1947 (age 78)

Sport
- Country: Italy
- Sport: Athletics
- Event: Long-distance running

Achievements and titles
- Personal best: 1500 m: 3:46.6 (1971)

Gaetano Pusterla (born 20 October 1947) is a former Italian male long-distance runner who competed at 2 editions of the IAAF World Cross Country Championships (1971 and 1973).
