= Giovanna Leone =

Italian long-distance runner

Personal information
- National team: Italy (3 caps 1974)
- Born: 3 May 1956 (age 70) Palermo, Italy

Sport
- Country: Italy
- Sport: Athletics
- Events: Middle-distance running; Cross country running
Medal record
World Cross Country Championships
Silver medal – second place	1974 Monza	Team

Giovanna Leone (born 3 May 1956) is a former Italian female middle-distance runner and cross-country runner who competed at individual senior level at the World Athletics Cross Country Championships (1974).

== Biography ==
Leone won a silver medal with the national team at the 1974 IAAF World Cross Country Championships.

== See also ==
- List of Italian records in masters athletics
