= Achiel Vaes =

Belgian long-distance runner (1944–2024)

Personal information
- Born: 28 August 1944
- Died: 30 September 2024 (aged 80)

Sport
- Country: Belgium
- Sport: Athletics
- Event: Cross country running
Medal record
Men's athletics
Representing Belgium
World Cross Country Championships
Gold medal – first place	1974 Monza	Senior team
International Cross Country Championships
Bronze medal – third place	1970 Vichy	Senior team
Silver medal – second place	1971 San Sebastián	Senior team

Achiel Vaes (also spelled Achille; 28 August 1944 – 30 September 2024) was a Belgian long-distance runner. He was the team gold medalist in the men's race at the 1974 World Cross Country Championships.

== Career ==
Vaes first compted at the 1970 International Cross Country Championships senior race. He placed 29th, finishing as Belgium's fourth scorer and contributing to their bronze team medal.

At the following year's 1971 International Cross Country Championships, Vaes was 66th. He was the 7th Belgian finisher and won the silver team medal.

Vaes returned to represent Belgium at the 1974 World Cross Country Championships senior race. He finished 50th, contributing to Belgium's team gold medal. Vaes won the 1974 Grote Ereprijs van de Koninklijke Belgische Atletiekbond award along with his other teammates.

== Personal life ==
Vaes was born on 28 August 1944 in Ramsel, Herselt, Antwerp Province, Belgium. He married José De Groot and had one daughter. He represented the Booischot AC in Booischot, Heist-op-den-Berg, a club which later merged into Koninklijke Atletiek Vereniging Zuiderkempen (AVZK).

He died on 30 September 2024 in Geel.
