= Berny Boxem-Lenferink =

Dutch middle-distance runner

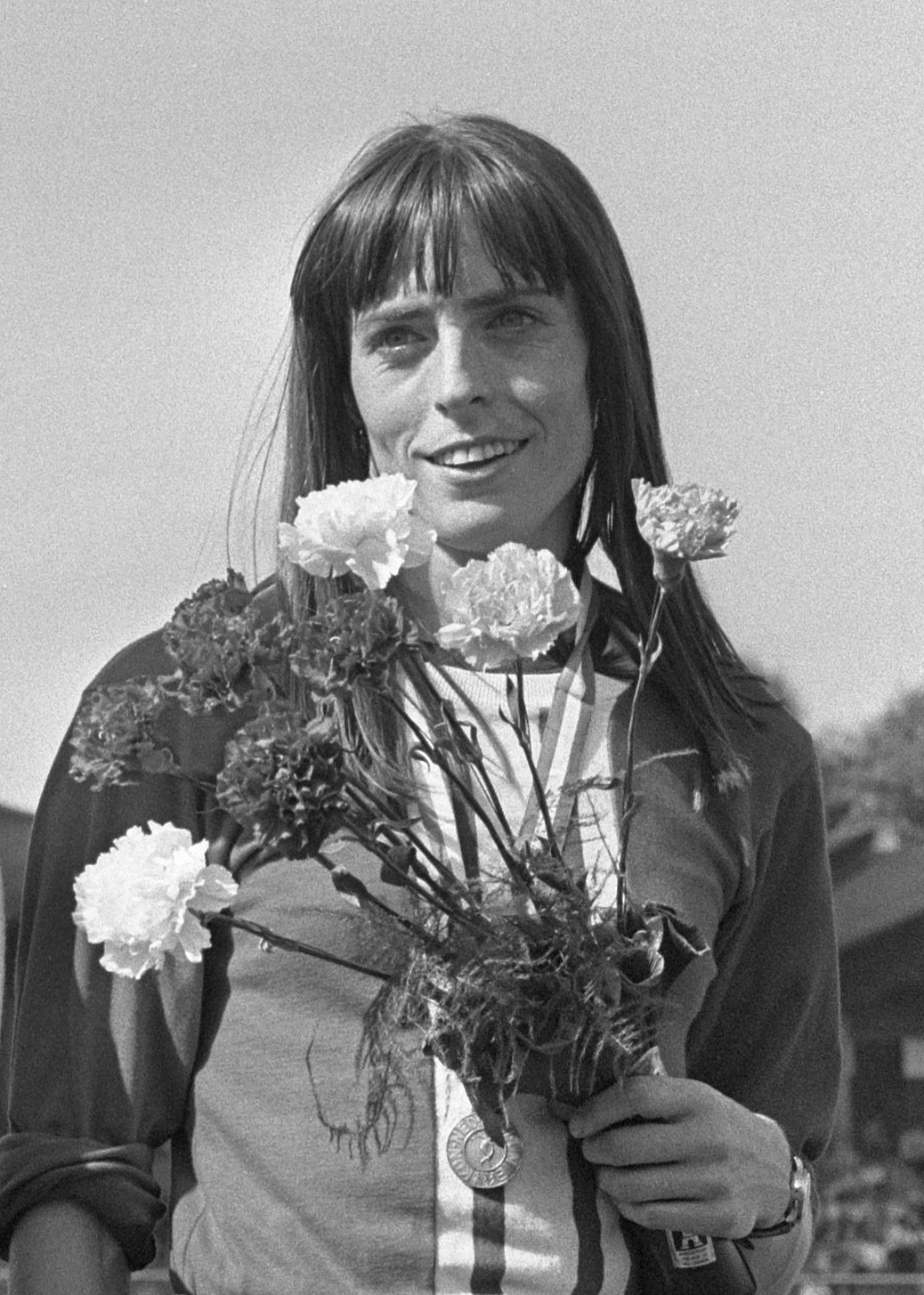
- Berny Boxem-Lenferink in 1972

Personal information
- Nationality: Dutch
- Born: 12 May 1948 Tubbergen, the Netherlands
- Died: 12 April 2023 (aged 74) Mijdrecht
- Height: 1.72 m (5 ft 8 in)
- Weight: 55 kg (121 lb)

Sport
- Sport: Middle-distance running
- Club: Marathon 50, Vlissingen

Achievements and titles
- Olympic finals: 1972
Medal record
Representing the Netherlands
International Cross Country Championships
Silver medal – second place	1971 San Sebastián	2.8 mi (4.5 km)

Bernardina Maria "Berny" Boxem-Lenferink (née Lenferink; 12 May 1948 – 12 April 2023), was a Dutch middle-distance runner. She competed at the 1972 Summer Olympics in the 1500 metres event and finished in ninth place. She won a silver medal at the 1971 International Cross Country Championships.

== Biography ==
Berny Lenferink was born in Albergen, to Wijlen Antonius Jan Lenferink and Wilhelmina Maria Boswerger in a family of nine siblings. She joined an athletics club following her elder sister Ans. In 1968, she competed in her first national championships, in the 800 m, and finished behind Ans, who won the bronze medal. During that race she broke a bone in her foot, which hindered her training through 1968–1969.

On 23 December 1970, Lenferinke married Leo Boxem and changed her last name to Boxem-Lenferink. She retired from athletics shortly after the 1972 Olympics, aged 24, due to lack of motivation. During her career she won two national cross country titles (2600 m in 1971 and 2500 m in 1972).

She died on 12 April 2023, aged 74, in Mijdrecht where she lived.
