= Gerda Ranz =

German middle-distance runner

Personal information
- Nationality: German
- Born: 29 November 1944 (age 81)

Sport
- Sport: Middle-distance running
- Event: 1500 metres

Gerda Ranz (born 29 November 1944) is a German middle-distance runner. She competed in the women's 1500 metres at the 1972 Summer Olympics.
