= Marijke Moser =

Dutch-born Swiss middle and long-distance runner (1946–2026)

Personal information
- Nationality: Swiss, Dutch
- Born: Marijke Van de Graaf; 13 November 1946 Netherlands
- Died: 1 August 2026 (aged 79)
- Height: 1.66 m (5 ft 5 in)
- Weight: 49 kg (108 lb)
- Spouse: Albrecht Moser

Sport
- Sport: Running
- Events: 1500 m, 3000 m, 10 km, Marathon

Achievements and titles
- Olympic finals: 1972
- Updated on 23 May 2017

Marijke Moser (née Van de Graaf; 13 November 1946 – 1 August 2026) was a Dutch-born Swiss middle and long-distance runner. She has campaigned for women to enter races on the same terms as men. She was the first woman to run a marathon in under three hours.

== Biography ==
From the age of five to twelve, Marijke van de Graaf lived with her parents in Indonesia, where her father was physician. In 1970 she married Albrecht Moser who was a member of the same athletics club as her in Hilversum in the Netherlands, after which the couple moved to Bern. Moser campaigned for the right of women to run in all races on equal terms to men. She managed to participate in the male-only Morat-Freiburg race in 1971 as a "clandestine" entry. She registered as a man named Markus Aebischer. Moser ran in the 1500m at the 1972 Olympics for Switzerland. She came eighth in the first heat and she was eliminated before the final. In October 1974 Moser finished a marathon at Neuf-Brisach with a time of 2:59:24. Having dual nationality, this made her the first Dutch and first Swiss woman to run the marathon under three hours. She never improved on this time, though in 1978 she became the first official Swiss female marathon winner in a time of 2:59:38.

Her partner was the athlete Albrecht Moser. Her daughter, Mirja Jenni-Moser (de), also participated in the Morat-Friborg race in 2006, 35 years after the success of her mother Marijke Moser.

Marijke Moser died on 1 August 2026, at the age of 79.
