= Mario Binato =

Italian long-distance runner

Personal information
- Nationality: Italian
- Born: 22 September 1940 (age 85)

Sport
- Country: Italy
- Sport: Athletics
- Event: Long-distance running

Achievements and titles
- Personal best: Marathon: 2:20:47 (1974)

Mario Binato (born 22 September 1940) is a former Italian male long-distance runner who competed at one edition of the IAAF World Cross Country Championships at senior level (1973),
