= Jean Levaillant =

19th-century French general

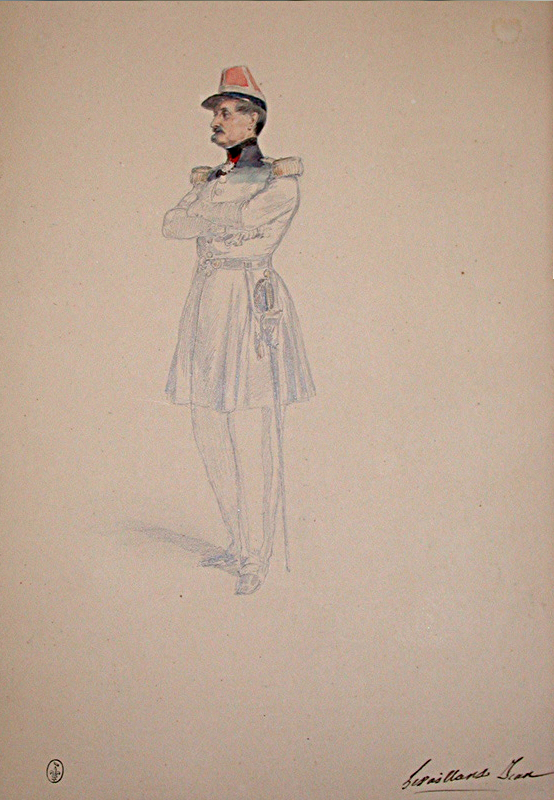
Portrait of Jean Levaillant by Auguste Raffet, watercolor from the 1849 Siege of Rome album, Chantilly, Musée Condé.

Jean Levaillant was a French Brigadier general, born on October 5, 1790, in Cambrai (Nord), France and died on January 13, 1876, in Sézanne.

== Biography ==
Jean Levaillant is the son of the traveler and naturalist scholar François Levaillant. He is a brother of General Charles Levaillant and Commander Jean-Jacques Rousseau Levaillant. He is also the first cousin of Caroline Aupick, the mother of poet Charles Baudelaire.

On February 10, 1811, he became a sergeant in the training battalion of the Fontainebleau guard at the age of 20, until June 18, 1812.

On December 7, 1833, he became battalion commander in the 18th Line, and lieutenant-colonel in the 1st Regiment on March 15, 1838.

Sent to the African army at that time, he served there with distinction in the campaigns of 1838, 1839, 1840 and 1841, and was appointed colonel of the 36th Line Regiment on March 10, 1841. He returned to Africa from 1844 to 1848 and was promoted to the rank of brigadier general on June 12, 1848. In that same year, he was part of the Rome expedition and commanded a brigade of this army corps, on this occasion the painter Auguste Raffet painted his portrait as well as that of Pope Pius IX.

In 1852 (commanding the 1st Brigade of the occupation division of Rome) he chaired a commission of Italian officers who drafted the regulations for the internal service of the pontifical infantry published under the title Regolamento sul servizio interno per le truppe pontificie di fanteria, Rome, 1854.

He died in 1876 and was buried in the cemetery of La Noue in the department of Marne. His father's tomb, in the same enclosure, is twinned with his own.
