= Italo Tentorini =

Italian long-distance runner

Personal information
- Nationality: Italian
- Born: 11 September 1950 (age 75)

Sport
- Country: Italy
- Sport: Athletics
- Event: Long-distance running
- Club: ASSI Giglio Rosso

Achievements and titles
- Personal best: Marathon: 2:20:06 (1972)

Italo Tentorini (born 11 September 1950) is a former Italian male long-distance runner who competed at one edition of the IAAF World Cross Country Championships at senior level (1976), He won one national championships at senior level.
