= Mario Vaiani-Lisi =

Italian long-distance runner

Personal information
- Nationality: Italian
- Born: 27 September 1950 (age 75)

Sport
- Country: Italy
- Sport: Athletics
- Event: Long-distance running

Achievements and titles
- Personal best: 3000 m: 8:15.0 (1973)

Mauro Vaiani-Lisi (born 27 September 1950) is a former Italian male long-distance runner who competed at two editions of the IAAF World Cross Country Championships (1974 and 1975).

== See also ==
- List of Italian records in masters athletics
