= Mike Baxter (athlete) =

English international athlete and current coach born 1941

Personal information
- Nationality: British (English)
- Born: 1945 (age 80–81) Leeds, Yorkshire
- Education: Roundhay School, Leeds

Sport
- Sport: Athletics
- Event: Cross Country / long distance
- Club: Leeds City AC

Michael Ian Baxter (born 1945), is a retired male international athlete and current coach.

== Biography ==
Baxter born in Leeds, was educated at Roundhay School, Leeds. A member of the Leeds City Club, he finished fourth in the 1968 AAA Championships and finished runner-up in the 1969 Northern cross-country. He trained with Brendan Foster and was selected for Great Britain's team for the 1969 European Athletics Championships in Athens.

Baxter represented England in the 5,000 metres, at the 1970 British Commonwealth Games in Edinburgh, Scotland.

His best year came in 1971, when he became the British 5,000 metres champion after winning the British AAA Championships title at the 1971 AAA Championships. He also competed in the 1971 European Athletics Championships in Helsinki.

Since retiring from competitive racing, he has coached athletes.
