= Brunello Bertolin =

Italian long-distance runner

Personal information
- Nationality: Italian
- Born: 1 June 1943 (age 83)

Sport
- Country: Italy
- Sport: Athletics
- Event(s): Long-distance running 3000 metres steeplechase

Achievements and titles
- Personal best: 3000 m st: 8:42.4 (1970)

Brunello Bertolin (born 1 June 1943) is a former Italian male long-distance runner who competed at one editions of the IAAF World Cross Country Championships (1973), and won the national championships at senior level.
