= Luigi Lauro =

Italian long-distance runner

Personal information
- Nationality: Italian
- Born: 31 January 1951 (age 75)

Sport
- Country: Italy
- Sport: Athletics
- Event: Long-distance running

Achievements and titles
- Personal bests: 5000 m: 13:47.9 (1975); 10,000 m: 28:52.2 (1975)

Luigi Lauro (born 31 January 1951) is a former Italian male long-distance runner who competed at five editions of the IAAF World Cross Country Championships (from 1974 to 1979).
