= Bruna Lovisolo =

Italian long-distance runner

Personal information
- National team: Italy (6 caps 1972-1975)
- Born: 6 March 1951 (age 75) Turin, Italy

Sport
- Country: Italy
- Sport: Athletics
- Events: Middle-distance running; Cross country running

Achievements and titles
- Personal best: 1500 m: 4:32.02 (1975)
Medal record
World Cross Country Championships
Silver medal – second place	1974 Monza	Team

Bruna Lovisolo (born 6 March 1951) is a former Italian female middle-distance runner and cross-country runner who competed at individual senior level at the World Athletics Cross Country Championships (1973, 1974, 1975).

== Biography ==
Lovisolo won a silver medal with the national team at the 1974 IAAF World Cross Country Championships.

== National titles ==
She won a national championship at the individual senior level.

- Italian Athletics Championships
  - 3000 m: 1972

== See also ==
- Italian team at the running events
