= Giuseppe Gerbi =

Italian athletics competitor

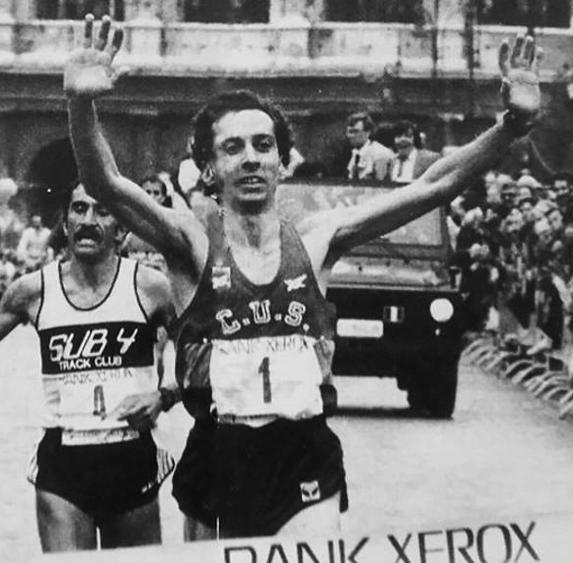

Personal information
- Nationality: Italian
- Born: 13 September 1955 (age 70) Collegno
- Height: 1.74 m (5 ft 8 1/2 in)
- Weight: 53 kg (117 lb)

Sport
- Country: Italy
- Sport: Athletics
- Events: Long-distance running 3000 metres steeplechase Marathon
- Club: Cus Torino

Achievements and titles
- Personal bests: 5000 m: 13:37.24 (1981); 10,000 m: 28:31.59 (1981); 3000 m st: 8:18.47 (1980); Marathon: 2:11:25 (1982)
Medal record
World Cross Country Jr. Championships
Bronze medal – third place	1974 Monza	Team

Giuseppe Gerbi (born 13 September 1955) is an Italian male retired long-distance runner, steeplechaseer, than at the end of his career he became a marathon runner, he finished 6th in the 3000 m steeplechase at the 1980 Summer Olympics.

== Biography ==
He won fournational championships at senior level, and he also was the winner of the 1983 Rome City Marathon. After his retirement from athletics he became a medical provider in Turin.

== National records ==
- 3000 metres steeplechase: 8:18.47, (Soviet Union) Moscow, 31 July 1980. Record held until 5 August 1980.
- One hour: 20,483 m, (Italy) Rome, 17 April 1982. Current holder.
- 25,000 metres: 1:16:40.0, (Italy) Novi Ligure, 10 April 1983. Current holder.

== Achievements ==
Year	Competition	Venue	Position	Event	Time	Notes
1978	European Championships	(Czechoslovakia) Prague	9th	3000 metres steeplechase	8:42.8	
1980	Olympic Games	(Soviet Union) Moscow	6th	3000 metres steeplechase	8:18.47	PB
1982	Italian Athletics Championships	(Italy) Ferrara	1st	Italian Athletics Championships	2:11:25	
1983	Rome Marathon	(Italy) Rome	1st	Marathon	2:15:11	

== National titles ==
- Italian Athletics Championships
  - 5000 metres: 1976
  - Marathon: 1982, 1983
- Italian Athletics Indoor Championships
  - 3000 metres: 1977

== See also ==
- Italian all-time top lists - 3000 metres steeplechase
- List of Italian records in athletics
