= John Hartnett (athlete) =

Irish long-distance runner

Personal information
- Nationality: Irish
- Born: 7 July 1950 (age 76)

Sport
- Sport: Long-distance running
- Event: 5000 metres

John Hartnett (born 7 July 1950) is an Irish long-distance runner. He competed in the men's 5000 metres at the 1972 Summer Olympics.

Hartnett competed for the Villanova Wildcats track and field team in the NCAA.
