= Desmond McGann =

Irish long-distance runner

Personal information
- Nationality: Irish
- Born: 21 July 1945 (age 80)

Sport
- Sport: Long-distance running
- Event: Marathon

Desmond McGann (born 21 July 1945) is an Irish long-distance runner. He competed in the marathon at the 1972 Summer Olympics.
