= Waltraud Egger =

Italian long-distance runner

Personal information
- National team: Italy (6 caps 1971-1974)
- Born: 4 April 1950 (age 76) Merano, Italy

Sport
- Country: Italy
- Sport: Athletics
- Events: Middle-distance running; Cross country running

Achievements and titles
- Personal best: 1500 m: 4:32.02 (1975)
Medal record
World Cross Country Championships
Silver medal – second place	1974 Monza	Team

Waltraud Egger (born 4 April 1950) is a former Italian female middle-distance runner and cross-country runner who competed at individual senior level at the World Athletics Cross Country Championships (1971, 1972, 1974).

== Biography ==
Egger won a silver medal with the national team at the 1974 IAAF World Cross Country Championships.

== See also ==
- List of Italian records in masters athletics
