= Claudio Solone =

Italian long-distance runner

Personal information
- Nationality: Italian
- Born: 12 April 1953 (age 73)

Sport
- Country: Italy
- Sport: Athletics
- Event: Long-distance running

Achievements and titles
- Personal best: Half marathon: 1:05:27 (1985)

Claudio Solone (born 12 April 1953) is a former Italian male long-distance runner who competed at four editions of the IAAF World Cross Country Championships (from 1974 to 1981), and won two national championships at senior level.
