= Nina Holmén =

Finnish former long-distance runner (born 1951)

Medal record

Women's athletics

Representing Finland

European Championships
Gold medal – first place	1974 Rome	3000 m

World Cross Country Championships
Silver medal – second place	1973 Waregem	Team race
Silver medal – second place	1974 Monza	Individual race
Bronze medal – third place	1974 Monza	Team race

Siv Nina Anette Holmén (née Wärn; born 29 September 1951, in Esse) is a Finnish former long-distance runner.

Nina Holmén won the first European Championship in women's 3000 meters running in 1974. She competed also in Olympics 1976 finishing 9th in 1500 meters running. Her best event, 3000 meters, was not in the Olympic schedule that time.

Nina Holmén also competed successfully in cross-country running. She won silver medal in World Cross Country Championships in 1974. In 1973 she was 10th. In addition she won two medals in team race.

== Personal bests ==
- 800m 2:03,67 (Turku 4.7.1976)
- 1500m 4:06,93 (Turku 2.7.1976),
- Mile 4:38,4 (Vantaa 27.5.1976)
- 3000m 8:55,10 (Rome 2.9.1974),
- 5000m 16:04,2 (Jakobstad 30.5.1976),
