= Roberto Gervasini =

Italian runner

Personal information
- Nationality: Italian
- Born: 25 June 1947 (age 79) Varese ( Lombardia )

Sport
- Country: Italy
- Sport: Athletics
- Event: Long-distance running

Achievements and titles
- Personal best: 5000 m: 13:58.0 (1971) 1500 m: 3.39.2 (1974)
Medal record
European Junior Games
Gold medal – first place	1966 Odessa	1500 m

Roberto Gervasini (born 25 June 1947) is a former Italian male long-distance runner who competed at one edition of the IAAF World Cross Country Championships at senior level (1974), and won two national championships at senior level (two national indoor championships) in 1970 and 1975 on the 1500 m.
