= Seppo Nikkari =

Finnish long-distance runner (1948–2022)

Personal information
- Nationality: Finnish
- Born: 6 February 1948 Pomarkku, Finland
- Died: 18 April 2022 (aged 74)

Sport
- Sport: Long-distance running
- Event: Marathon

Seppo Nikkari (6 February 1948 – 18 April 2022) was a Finnish long-distance runner. He competed in the marathon at the 1972 Summer Olympics.
