= Albrecht Moser =

Swiss long-distance runner

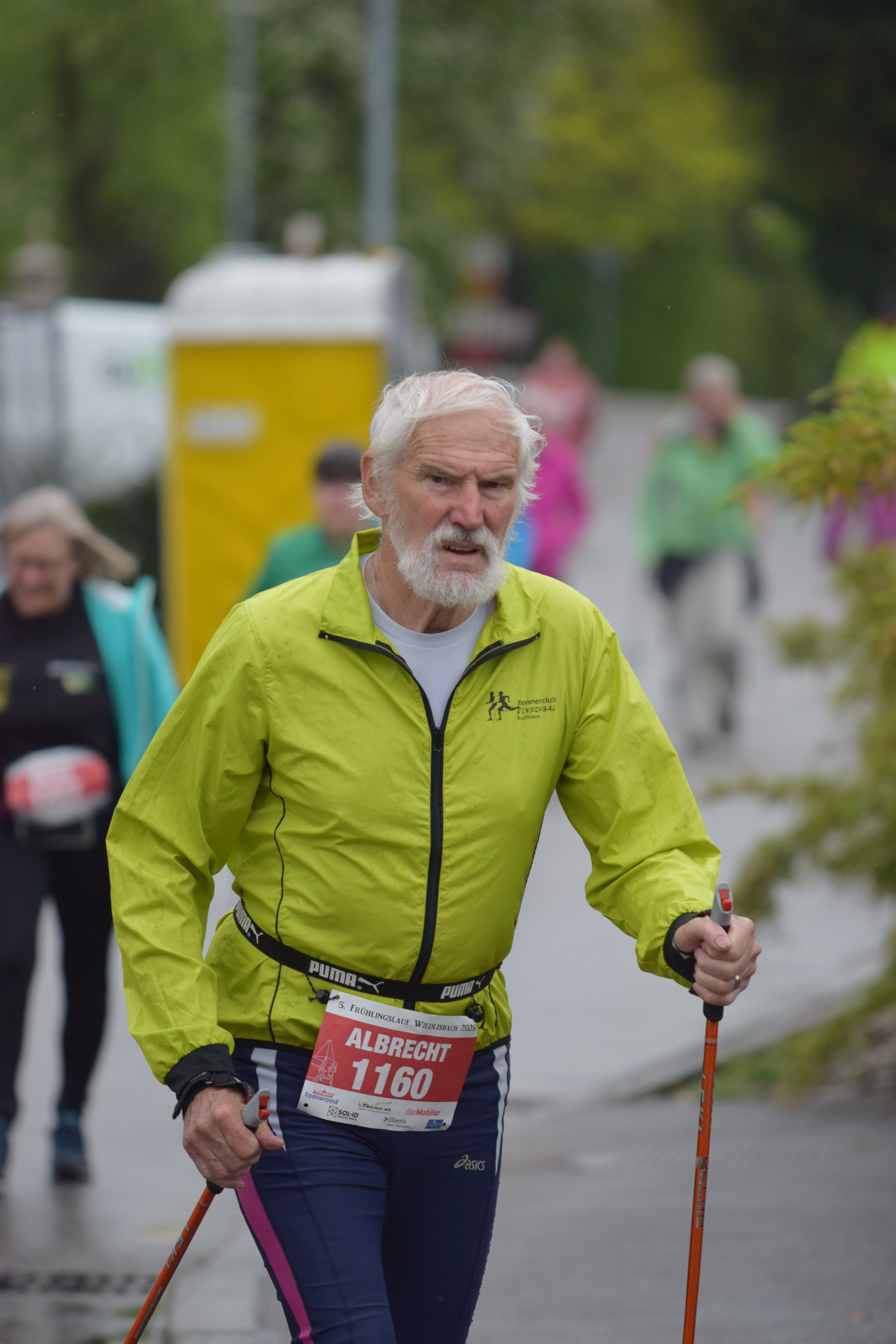
- Moser in 2025

Personal information
- Nationality: Swiss
- Born: 28 January 1945 (age 81)

Sport
- Sport: Long-distance running
- Event: 10,000 metres

Albrecht Moser (born 28 January 1945) is a Swiss long-distance runner. He competed in the men's 10,000 metres at the 1972 Summer Olympics.
