= Erik De Beck =

Belgian long-distance runner

Medal record

Men's athletics

Representing Belgium

IAAF World Cross Country Championships
Gold medal – first place	1974 Monza	Long race
Gold medal – first place	1973 Waregem	Team race
Gold medal – first place	1974 Monza	Team race
Gold medal – first place	1977 Düsseldorf	Team race

Erik De Beck (born 6 June 1951) is a Belgian former long-distance runner who specialised in cross country running. His greatest performance was a gold medal at the 1974 IAAF World Cross Country Championships. He shared in the team title at that event on three occasions: 1973, 1974 and 1977.

De Beck won three national titles in his career, taking two cross country wins (1974 and 1976) and one 10,000 metres title (1983). He totalled nine appearances at the IAAF World Cross Country Championships as well as three outings at its precursor, the International Cross Country Championships, where he was a junior medallist in 1970. He married Joske Van Santberghe, who was also a medallist at the World Cross Country Championships.

== Career ==
Born in Merelbeke, in his youth he joined K.A.A. Gent – one of the oldest sports clubs in the country. While he was still at high school De Beck entered the 1967 Cross van Le Soir, a major cross country race open to the public, and finished eleventh overall. He continued to improve in the discipline and his first successes came in 1970, when he won the Belgian junior title and took the bronze medal in the junior section of that year's International Cross Country Championships. The following year he managed only eleventh place at the international event, but on his senior debut he placed seventh and helped Belgium to the third in the team rankings, alongside the race winner Gaston Roelants. De Beck married fellow cross country runner Joske Van Santberghe in 1972.

De Beck's career coincided with a strong period of men's long-distance running in Belgium in the 1970s, with Roelants, Willy Polleunis, Emiel Puttemans, Karel Lismont and Ivo Van Damme being the other protagonists. The 1973 IAAF World Cross Country Championships marked the inauguration of the modern world championship event and, held on home turf in Waregem, the Belgian trio of Polleunis, Roelants and De Beck won the first team title (De Beck placed 18th individually). De Beck won his first national title in cross country a year later. He produced an upset at the 1974 IAAF World Cross Country Championships by winning the title just ahead of Mariano Haro (the 1973 runner-up) and leading the Belgian men to the team gold medal.

He missed the 1975 season but returned to action by winning the 1976 Belgian cross country title. He failed to repeat his previous success at the 1976 IAAF World Cross Country Championships, coming 49th, although Belgium took the team silver medals. His teammate Léon Schots won the gold at the 1977 IAAF World Cross Country Championships and De Beck's 18th-place finish saw him share in the team title for a third time in his career. As the 1970s neared to a close, the performance of the Belgian team declined: De Beck was 26th at both the 1978 and 1979 races, with Belgium ranking fifth overall in each competition. After missing the 1980 season, he was only 64th in 1981. He was his country's best performer at the 1982 and 1983 World Cross Country Championships, finishing 17th each time.

De Beck turned to the track in 1983 and won the third (and last) Belgian title of his career by running 29:42.56 minutes for the 10,000 metres. His last year of major competition came in 1987: he finished 73rd at the 1987 IAAF World Cross Country Championships and won the Zwijndrecht Marathon in a time of 2:21:50 hours.
