= Joyce Smith =

British long-distance runner (born 1937)

Joyce Smith MBE
Personal information
- Nationality: British (English)
- Born: 26 October 1937 (age 88) Stoke Newington, England
- Height: 1.69 m (5 ft 7 in)
- Weight: 52 kg (115 lb)

Sport
- Sport: Athletics
- Events: 1500 metres 3000 metres marathon
- Club: Barnet and District AC
Medal record
Women's athletics
Representing Great Britain
European Championships
Bronze medal – third place	1974 Rome	3000 m

Joyce Esther Smith MBE (née Byatt, born 26 October 1937) is a British former long-distance runner. She broke the world record in the 3000 metres in 1971 and is a three-time medallist at the International/World Cross Country Championships, including winning in 1972. She went on to twice win the London Marathon, becoming the first British woman in history to run under 2:30 when winning in 1981 with 2:29:57, before further improving the British record to 2:29:43 when winning in 1982. She also competed in the 1500 metres at the 1972 Munich Olympics and finished 11th in the marathon at the 1984 Los Angeles Olympics, aged 46.

== Biography ==
Smith was born in Stoke Newington, London, and began running competitively in the 1950s, at which time the longest distance for women in international competitions was 800 metres. She won the English National Crosscountry Championship (AAA) in 1959 and 1960.

Smith became the national 1 mile champion after winning the British WAAA Championships title at the 1965 WAAA Championships. and during that year, she told Athletics Weekly that she intended to continue competing "for two more years at the most" and stopped running competitively in 1968.

Smith returned to competitive running in 1969, and broke the world record for the 3000 metres distance at the 1971 WAAA Championships. She won the bronze medal in 1971, the gold medal in 1972 and the silver medal in 1973 in the IAAF World Cross Country Championships. She reached the semi-final of the 1500 metres at the 1972 Olympic Games. In 1973, she won her third National Crosscountry Championship She won the bronze medal in 3000 m at the European Athletics Championships in 1974.

In 1978, she retired from track running after setting a new world record for 3000 m in the age group W40 of 9:11.2 minutes, which was broken 27 years later, and ran her first marathon in 1979, beating the previous British record held by Rosemary Cox by nine minutes and seventeen seconds in a time of 2:41:37.

In 1979, she won the Avon International Marathon in Waldniel and the British national title at Sandbach. In 1979 and 1980, she won the first two editions of the Tokyo International Women's Marathon. In 1980, she set a new British 25 kilometre record of 1:28:18 in Bruges, which was also the new W40 world record which was broken 24 years later.

In 1981, she won the first London Marathon in 2:29:57, becoming the first British woman and the first woman over 40 to complete the distance in less than two and a half hours. A year later, she won the event in 2:29:43, again setting a new British record, and becoming the oldest woman to win the race at 44 years, 195 days, a record which has not yet been broken.

In the first World Athletics Championships in 1983 in Helsinki, she finished ninth in the marathon. In 1984, she became the oldest female Olympic athlete by running in the first women's Olympic marathon, and finished eleventh at the age of 46.

She retired from competitive running in 1986 after setting a new W45 record for the ten-mile distance of 55:33.

In the 1984 New Year Honours, Smith was appointed a Member of the Order of the British Empire (MBE) for services to athletics. She and her husband, Bryan, are on the board of trustees of the London Marathon Charitable Trust. Bryan is a marathon coach who also organises the Mini London Marathon.

== Achievements ==
Year	Competition	Venue	Position	Event	Notes
Representing Great Britain and England
1971	International Cross Country Championships	San Sebastián, Spain	3rd	4.5 km	11:24
1972	International Cross Country Championships	Cambridge, United Kingdom	1st	4.5 km	16:11
1972	Olympic Games	Munich, Germany	12th (sf)	1500 m	4:09.4
1973	World Cross Country Championships	Waregem, Belgium	2nd	4 km	13:58
1974	World Cross Country Championships	Monza, Italy	7th	4 km	13:04
1974	European Championships	Rome, Italy	3rd	3000 m	8:57.39
1978	World Cross Country Championships	Glasgow, United Kingdom	9th	4.7 km	17:23
1979	Avon International Women's Marathon	Waldniel, Germany	1st	Marathon	2:36:27
1979	Tokyo Marathon	Tokyo, Japan	1st	Marathon	2:37:48
1980	Avon International Women's Marathon	London, United Kingdom	7th	Marathon	2:41:22
1980	Tokyo Marathon	Tokyo, Japan	1st	Marathon	2:30:27
1981	London Marathon	London, United Kingdom	1st	Marathon	2:29:57
1982	Osaka International Ladies Marathon	Osaka, Japan	5th	Marathon	2:35:34
1982	London Marathon	London, United Kingdom	1st	Marathon	2:29:43
1983	Osaka International Ladies Marathon	Osaka, Japan	8th	Marathon	2:40:01
1983	World Championships	Helsinki, Finland	9th	Marathon	2:34:27
1984	Nagoya International Women's Marathon	Nagoya, Japan	6th	Marathon	2:38:55
1984	Olympic Games	Los Angeles, United States	11th	Marathon	2:32:48
1985	Osaka International Ladies Marathon	Osaka, Japan	7th	Marathon	2:38:09
1986	Osaka International Ladies Marathon	Osaka, Japan	14th	Marathon	2:42:36
(sf) Indicates overall position in semifinal round

Sporting positions
Preceded by Joan Samuelson	Women's Fastest Marathon Race; 1980	Succeeded by Allison Roe
