= 1981 IAAF World Cross Country Championships – Senior men's race =

Senior men's race at the 1981 IAAF World Cross Country Championships
- Organisers: IAAF
- Edition: 9th
- Date: March 28
- Host city: Madrid, Spain
- Venue: Hipódromo de la Zarzuela
- Events: 1
- Distances: 12 km – Senior men
- Participation: 238 athletes from 36 nations

The Senior men's race at the 1981 IAAF World Cross Country Championships was held in Madrid, Spain, at the Hipódromo de la Zarzuela on March 28, 1981. A report on the event was given in the Glasgow Herald.

Complete results, medallists, and the results of British athletes were published.

== Race results ==
=== Senior men's race (12 km) ===
Individual
Rank	Athlete	Country	Time
1st place, gold medalist(s)	Craig Virgin	United States	35:05
2nd place, silver medalist(s)	Mohammed Kedir	Ethiopia	35:07
3rd place, bronze medalist(s)	Fernando Mamede	Portugal	35:09
4	Julian Goater	England	35:13
5	Antonio Prieto	Spain	35:18
6	Rob de Castella	Australia	35:20
7	Girma Berhanu	Ethiopia	35:22
8	Thom Hunt	United States	35:23
9	Alex Hagelsteens	Belgium	35:24
10	Pierre Levisse	France	35:26
11	Rod Dixon	New Zealand	35:30
12	El Hachami Abdenouz	Algeria	35:34
13	Dereje Nedi	Ethiopia	35:39
14	Kebede Balcha	Ethiopia	35:40
15	Miruts Yifter	Ethiopia	35:42
16	Martti Vainio	Finland	35:42
17	Mark Nenow	United States	35:42
18	Bill Donakowski	United States	35:42
19	Bruce Bickford	United States	35:42
20	Roger de Vogel	Belgium	35:46
21	Lahcene Babaci	Algeria	35:47
22	Jackson Ruto	Kenya	35:49
23	Steve Austin	Australia	35:50
24	Peter Koech	Kenya	35:50
25	Alfred Nyasani	Kenya	35:50
26	Nat Muir	Scotland	35:50
27	José Luis González	Spain	35:50
28	Hans-Jürgen Orthmann	West Germany	35:50
29	Fernando Cerrada	Spain	35:55
30	Eshetu Tura	Ethiopia	35:59
31	Steve Jones	Wales	35:59
32	Hana Girma	Ethiopia	35:59
33	Steve Binns	England	35:59
34	John Andrews	Australia	35:59
35	Marios Kassianidis	Greece	35:59
36	Sammy Mogene	Kenya	35:59
37	Rachid Habchaoui	Algeria	35:59
38	Dave Clarke	England	35:59
39	Leonid Moseyev	Soviet Union	36:05
40	Bill Britton	Canada	36:05
41	Paul Ballinger	New Zealand	36:05
42	Luis Adsuara	Spain	36:05
43	Marc Nevens	Belgium	36:05
44	Eberhard Weyel	West Germany	36:05
45	Abdelmadjid Mada	Algeria	36:05
46	Vlastimil Zwiefelhofer	Czechoslovakia	36:05
47	Peter Butler	Canada	36:05
48	Allister Hutton	Scotland	36:05
49	Brian Lewry	Australia	36:12
50	Radhouane Bouster	France	36:12
51	George Malley	United States	36:12
52	Valeriy Sapon	Soviet Union	36:12
53	Miroslav Bauckmann	Czechoslovakia	36:20
54	John Robson	Scotland	36:20
55	Mohamed Zaidi	Tunisia	36:20
56	Wilson Musonik	Kenya	36:20
57	Some Muge	Kenya	36:20
58	Euan Robertson	New Zealand	36:20
59	David James	Wales	36:20
60	Dave Taylor	Ireland	36:20
61	Patrick Clabaut	France	36:20
62	Maxwell Little	Australia	36:20
63	Daniel Dillon	United States	36:20
64	Eric de Beck	Belgium	36:20
65	Klaas Lok	Netherlands	36:30
66	José Sena	Portugal	36:30
67	Detlef Uhlemann	West Germany	36:30
68	Joseph Kiptum	Kenya	36:30
69	Venanzio Ortis	Italy	36:30
70	Ken Newton	England	36:30
71	Yevgeniy Okorokov	Soviet Union	36:30
72	Cor Lambregts	Netherlands	36:30
73	Greg Duhaime	Canada	36:30
74	Angel Gómez Maeso	Spain	36:30
75	Tolossa Kotu	Ethiopia	36:30
76	Bernie Ford	England	36:30
77	Jorge García	Spain	36:30
78	Vadim Sidorov	Soviet Union	36:30
79	Vern Iwancin	Canada	36:30
80	Mike McGuire	United States	36:30
81	Chris Wardlaw	Australia	36:30
82	Gerry Deegan	Ireland	36:30
83	Daniel Janczuk	Poland	36:38
84	Alex Gonzalez	France	36:38
85	François Person	France	36:38
86	Rafael Marques	Portugal	36:38
87	Nicolas Halatzis	Greece	36:38
88	Vladimir Anisimov	Soviet Union	36:38
89	Kyriakos Lazaridis	Greece	36:44
90	Ralf Salzmann	West Germany	36:44
91	Dave Moorcroft	England	36:44
92	Santiago de la Parte	Spain	36:44
93	Jan van Oss	Netherlands	36:44
94	Alberto Cova	Italy	36:44
95	Aniceto Simoes	Portugal	36:44
96	Ryszard Kopijasz	Poland	36:44
97	Vesa Kähkölä	Finland	36:44
98	Bogumil Kus	Poland	36:50
99	Giuseppe Gerbi	Italy	36:50
100	Garry Bentley	Australia	36:50
101	John Woods	Ireland	36:50
102	Tommy Persson	Sweden	36:50
103	Mark Muggleton	United States	36:50
104	Desmond O'Connor	Ireland	36:50
105	Mehdi Aidet	Algeria	36:59
106	Ronny Agten	Belgium	36:59
107	Krzysztof Wesolowski	Poland	36:59
108	Christoph Herle	West Germany	36:59
109	Luigi Zarcone	Italy	36:59
110	Hannu Okkola	Finland	36:59
111	Bernardo Manuel	Angola	36:59
112	Dominique Chauvelier	France	36:59
113	Fotios Kourtis	Greece	36:59
114	Boguslaw Psujek	Poland	36:59
115	Adelaziz Bouguerra	Tunisia	36:59
116	Tom Birnie	New Zealand	36:59
117	Tonni Luttikhold	Netherlands	36:59
118	Neil Cusack	Ireland	36:59
119	Arturo Iacona	Italy	36:59
120	John Doherty	Northern Ireland	36:59
121	John Robertshaw	Wales	36:59
122	Ian Gilmour	Scotland	37:05
123	Valeriy Abramov	Soviet Union	37:17
124	Francisco Sánchez	Spain	37:17
125	Gary Palmer	New Zealand	37:17
126	Roger Hackney	Wales	37:17
127	Filippos Filippou	Greece	37:17
128	Helder de Jesús	Portugal	37:17
129	Mihaíl Koúsis	Greece	37:17
130	Kaibou El Hadj	Algeria	37:17
131	Chris Buckley	Wales	37:17
132	Kevin Forster	England	37:17
133	Claudio Solone	Italy	37:17
134	Lawrie Spence	Scotland	37:17
135	Emiel Puttemans	Belgium	37:17
136	Barry Ellis	New Zealand	37:17
137	Bram Wassenaar	Netherlands	37:17
138	Günther Zahn	West Germany	37:17
139	Jef Gees	Belgium	37:17
140	Art Boileau	Canada	37:17
141	Piet Vonck	Netherlands	37:17
142	Alain Bordeleau	Canada	37:34
143	Justin Gloden	Luxembourg	37:34
144	Yehuda Zadok	Israel	37:34
145	Rabah Zaidi	Tunisia	37:34
146	Jacques Boxberger	France	37:34
147	Adriano Musonye	Kenya	37:34
148	Willy van Huylenbroeck	Belgium	37:34
149	Henrik Sandström	Finland	37:34
150	Mario Gelli	Italy	37:34
151	Alan Thurlow	New Zealand	37:34
152	Peter Daenens	Belgium	37:34
153	Spiridon Nakos	Greece	37:34
154	Abdelkrim Djelassi	Tunisia	37:34
155	Mahmoud Hazzazi	Algeria	37:34
156	Niels Kim Hjorth	Denmark	37:34
157	Faisal Touzri	Tunisia	37:34
158	Rob Lonergan	Canada	37:34
159	Andreas Weniger	West Germany	37:50
160	Antonio Leitão	Portugal	37:50
161	Denis Stark	Canada	37:50
162	Ali Ouchene	Algeria	37:50
163	Alan Cole	Wales	37:50
164	Hussein Soltani	Tunisia	37:50
165	Bob Treadwell	England	37:50
166	Gerry Craig	Northern Ireland	37:50
167	Juan Torres	Spain	37:50
168	John Hartnett	Ireland	37:50
169	Greg Hannon	Northern Ireland	37:50
170	Ilpo Jousimaa	Finland	37:50
171	Robert Neylon	Australia	37:50
172	Tony Simmons	Wales	37:50
173	John McLaughlin	Northern Ireland	37:50
174	Tony Blakewell	Wales	37:50
175	Mehmet Yürdadön	Turkey	37:50
176	Flemming Jensen	Denmark	37:50
177	Thierry Watrice	France	38:04
178	Vladimir Kotov	Soviet Union	38:04
179	John O'Toole	Ireland	38:04
180	Donald Greig	New Zealand	38:04
181	Peter Rusman	Netherlands	38:04
182	Dave Edge	Canada	38:04
183	Svend-Erik Kristensen	Denmark	38:15
184	Abdellah Messadia	Algeria	38:15
185	Keld Johnsen	Denmark	38:23
186	Michael Lane	Wales	38:23
187	Timothy O'Shaughnessy	Australia	38:29
188	Danny McDaid	Ireland	38:37
189	Féthi Baccouche	Tunisia	38:37
190	Nikólaos Argyuropoulos	Greece	38:37
191	Erkki Hälikkä	Finland	38:37
192	Alastair Douglas	Scotland	38:37
193	Gerhard Krippner	West Germany	38:40
194	Klaus Scharnberg Jensen	Denmark	38:40
195	Henk Mentink	Netherlands	38:51
196	Mansour Guettaya	Tunisia	38:51
197	Kimmo Mattila	Finland	39:05
198	Gerhard Hartmann	Austria	39:15
199	Gerard Kiernan	Ireland	39:18
200	John Rotich	Kenya	39:18
201	Pat McCullough	Northern Ireland	39:20
202	Pawel Lorens	Poland	39:23
203	Piero Selvaggio	Italy	39:30
204	Amara Chiha	Tunisia	39:33
205	Paul Craig	Northern Ireland	39:45
206	Morten Nøddebo	Denmark	39:45
207	Valeriy Kryulin	Soviet Union	39:54
208	Mike McLeod	England	40:24
209	Antonio Atabao	Portugal	40:32
210	Nabil Choueiry	Lebanon	40:47
211	Heino Lipsanen	Finland	41:10
212	João Carvalho	Angola	41:25
213	Musaed Al-Baghi	Saudi Arabia	41:34
214	Luis Muholo	Angola	41:45
215	Pedro Luciano	Angola	41:51
216	Ernesto José	Angola	42:01
217	Nader Al-Outaibi	Saudi Arabia	42:05
218	Pedro Capoca	Angola	42:05
219	Atieah Al-Shahrani	Saudi Arabia	42:27
220	Juvenal Minguito	Angola	42:27
221	Abdenghani Abdulridola	Saudi Arabia	42:33
222	Hamdan Al-Qahtani	Saudi Arabia	42:40
223	Abdulatif Moharit	Saudi Arabia	42:51
224	Sekou Camara	Guinea	42:53
225	Manuel Pascoal	Angola	43:15
226	Shetoui Aouadh Al-Bishi	Saudi Arabia	43:16
227	Ahmed Al-Thubiani	Saudi Arabia	43:39
228	Mamadou Barry	Guinea	44:58
—	Arye Gamliel	Israel	DNF
—	Francis Gonzalez	France	DNF
—	Carlos Lopes	Portugal	DNF
—	Kaarlo Maaninka	Finland	DNF
—	Bronisław Malinowski	Poland	DNF
—	Peter Renner	New Zealand	DNF
—	Graham Williamson	Scotland	DNF
—	Jim Brown	Scotland	DNF
—	Fernando Miguel	Portugal	DNF
—	Fraser Clyne	Scotland	DNF

Teams
Rank	Team	Points
1st place, gold medalist(s)	Ethiopia: Mohammed Kedir / 2; Girma Berhanu / 7; Dereje Nedi / 13; Kebede Balcha / 14; Miruts Yifter / 15; Eshetu Tura / 30; (Hana Girma) / (32); (Tolossa Kotu) / (75)	81
2nd place, silver medalist(s)	United States: Craig Virgin / 1; Thom Hunt / 8; Mark Nenow / 17; Bill Donakowski / 18; Bruce Bickford / 19; George Malley / 51; (Daniel Dillon) / (63); (Mike McGuire) / (80); (Mark Muggleton) / (103)	114
3rd place, bronze medalist(s)	Kenya: Jackson Ruto / 22; Peter Koech / 24; Alfred Nyasani / 25; Sammy Mogene / 36; Wilson Musonik / 56; Some Muge / 57; (Joseph Kiptum) / (68); (Adriano Musonye) / (147); (John Rotich) / (200)	220
4	Spain: Antonio Prieto / 5; José Luis González / 27; Fernando Cerrada / 29; Luis Adsuara / 42; Angel Gómez Maeso / 74; Jorge García / 77; (Santiago de la Parte) / (92); (Francisco Sánchez) / (124); (Juan Torres) / (167)	254
5	Australia: Rob de Castella / 6; Steve Austin / 23; John Andrews / 34; Brian Lewry / 49; Maxwell Little / 62; Chris Wardlaw / 81; (Garry Bentley) / (100); (Robert Neylon) / (171); (Timothy O'Shaughnessy) / (187)	255
6	England: Julian Goater / 4; Steve Binns / 33; Dave Clarke / 38; Ken Newton / 70; Bernie Ford / 76; Dave Moorcroft / 91; (Kevin Forster) / (132); (Bob Treadwell) / (165); (Mike McLeod) / (208)	312
7	Algeria: El Hachami Abdenouz / 12; Lahcene Babaci / 21; Rachid Habchaoui / 37; Abdelmadjid Mada / 45; Mehdi Aidet / 105; Kaibou El Hadj / 130; (Mahmoud Hazzazi) / (155); (Ali Ouchene) / (162); (Abdellah Messadia) / (184)	350
8	Belgium: Alex Hagelsteens / 9; Roger de Vogel / 20; Marc Nevens / 43; Eric de Beck / 64; Ronny Agten / 106; Emiel Puttemans / 135; (Jef Gees) / (139); (Willy van Huylenbroeck) / (148); (Peter Daenens) / (152)	377
9	France: Pierre Levisse / 10; Radhouane Bouster / 50; Patrick Clabaut / 61; Alex Gonzalez / 84; François Person / 85; Dominique Chauvelier / 112; (Jacques Boxberger) / (146); (Thierry Watrice) / (177); (Francis Gonzalez) / (DNF)	402
10	Soviet Union: Leonid Moseyev / 39; Valeriy Sapon / 52; Yevgeniy Okorokov / 71; Vadim Sidorov / 78; Vladimir Anisimov / 88; Valeriy Abramov / 123; (Vladimir Kotov) / (178); (Valeriy Kryulin) / (207)	451
11	West Germany: Hans-Jürgen Orthmann / 28; Eberhard Weyel / 44; Detlef Uhlemann / 67; Ralf Salzmann / 90; Christoph Herle / 108; Günther Zahn / 138; (Andreas Weniger) / (159); (Gerhard Krippner) / (193)	475
12	New Zealand: Rod Dixon / 11; Paul Ballinger / 41; Euan Robertson / 58; Tom Birnie / 116; Gary Palmer / 125; Barry Ellis / 136; (Alan Thurlow) / (151); (Donald Greig) / (180); (Peter Renner) / (DNF)	487
13	Canada: Bill Britton / 40; Peter Butler / 47; Greg Duhaime / 73; Vern Iwancin / 79; Art Boileau / 140; Alain Bordeleau / 142; (Rob Lonergan) / (158); (Denis Stark) / (161); (Dave Edge) / (182)	521
14	Portugal: Fernando Mamede / 3; José Sena / 66; Rafael Marques / 86; Aniceto Simoes / 95; Helder de Jesús / 128; Antonio Leitão / 160; (Antonio Atabao) / (209); (Carlos Lopes) / (DNF); (Fernando Miguel) / (DNF)	538
15	Scotland: Nat Muir / 26; Allister Hutton / 48; John Robson / 54; Ian Gilmour / 122; Lawrie Spence / 134; Alastair Douglas / 192; (Graham Williamson) / (DNF); (Jim Brown) / (DNF); (Fraser Clyne) / (DNF)	576
16	Greece: Marios Kassianidis / 35; Nicolas Halatzis / 87; Kyriakos Lazaridis / 89; Fotios Kourtis / 113; Filippos Filippou / 127; Mihaíl Koúsis / 129; (Spiridon Nakos) / (153); (Nikólaos Argyuropoulos) / (190)	580
17	Italy: Venanzio Ortis / 69; Alberto Cova / 94; Giuseppe Gerbi / 99; Luigi Zarcone / 109; Arturo Iacona / 119; Claudio Solone / 133; (Mario Gelli) / (150); (Piero Selvaggio) / (203)	623
18	Netherlands: Klaas Lok / 65; Cor Lambregts / 72; Jan van Oss / 93; Tonni Luttikhold / 117; Bram Wassenaar / 137; Piet Vonck / 141; (Peter Rusman) / (181); (Henk Mentink) / (195)	625
19	Wales: Steve Jones / 31; David James / 59; John Robertshaw / 121; Roger Hackney / 126; Chris Buckley / 131; Alan Cole / 163; (Tony Simmons) / (172); (Tony Blakewell) / (174); (Michael Lane) / (186)	631
20	Ireland: Dave Taylor / 60; Gerry Deegan / 82; John Woods / 101; Desmond O'Connor / 104; Neil Cusack / 118; John Hartnett / 168; (John O'Toole) / (179); (Danny McDaid) / (188); (Gerard Kiernan) / (199)	633
21	Poland: Daniel Janczuk / 83; Ryszard Kopijasz / 96; Bogumil Kus / 98; Krzysztof Wesolowski / 107; Boguslaw Psujek / 114; Pawel Lorens / 202; (Bronisław Malinowski) / (DNF)	700
22	Finland: Martti Vainio / 16; Vesa Kähkölä / 97; Hannu Okkola / 110; Henrik Sandström / 149; Ilpo Jousimaa / 170; Erkki Hälikkä / 191; (Kimmo Mattila) / (197); (Heino Lipsanen) / (211); (Kaarlo Maaninka) / (DNF)	733
23	Tunisia: Mohamed Zaidi / 55; Adelaziz Bouguerra / 115; Rabah Zaidi / 145; Abdelkrim Djelassi / 154; Faisal Touzri / 157; Hussein Soltani / 164; (Féthi Baccouche) / (189); (Mansour Guettaya) / (196); (Amara Chiha) / (204)	790
24	Northern Ireland: John Doherty / 120; Gerry Craig / 166; Greg Hannon / 169; John McLaughlin / 173; Pat McCullough / 201; Paul Craig / 205	1034
25	Denmark: Niels Kim Hjorth / 156; Flemming Jensen / 176; Svend-Erik Kristensen / 183; Keld Johnsen / 185; Klaus Scharnberg Jensen / 194; Morten Nøddebo / 206	1100
26	Angola: Bernardo Manuel / 111; João Carvalho / 212; Luis Muholo / 214; Pedro Luciano / 215; Ernesto José / 216; Pedro Capoca / 218; (Juvenal Minguito) / (220); (Manuel Pascoal) / (225)	1186
27	Saudi Arabia: Musaed Al-Baghi / 213; Nader Al-Outaibi / 217; Atieah Al-Shahrani / 219; Abdenghani Abdulridola / 221; Hamdan Al-Qahtani / 222; Abdulatif Moharit / 223; (Shetoui Aouadh Al-Bishi) / (226); (Ahmed Al-Thubiani) / (227)	1315

- Note: Athletes in parentheses did not score for the team result

== Participation ==
An unofficial count yields the participation of 238 athletes from 35 countries in the Senior men's race. This is in agreement with the official numbers as published.

- Algeria (9)
- Angola (8)
- Australia (9)
- Austria (1)
- Belgium (9)
- Canada (9)
- Czechoslovakia (2)
- Denmark (6)
- England (9)
- Ethiopia (8)
- Finland (9)
- France (9)
- Greece (8)
- Guinea (2)
- Ireland (9)
- Israel (2)
- Italy (8)
- Kenya (9)
- Lebanon (1)
- Luxembourg (1)
- Netherlands (8)
- New Zealand (9)
- Northern Ireland (6)
- Poland (7)
- Portugal (9)
- Saudi Arabia (8)
- Scotland (9)
- Soviet Union (8)
- Spain (9)
- Sweden (1)
- Tunisia (9)
- Turkey (1)
- United States (9)
- Wales (9)
- West Germany (8)

== See also ==
- 1981 IAAF World Cross Country Championships – Junior men's race
- 1981 IAAF World Cross Country Championships – Senior women's race
