= 1976 IAAF World Cross Country Championships – Junior men's race =

Junior men's race at the 1976 IAAF World Cross Country Championships
- Organisers: IAAF
- Edition: 4th
- Date: February 28
- Host city: Chepstow, Wales, UK (United Kingdom)
- Venue: Chepstow Racecourse
- Events: 1
- Distances: 7.8 km – Junior men
- Participation: 81 athletes from 15 nations

The Junior men's race at the 1976 IAAF World Cross Country Championships was held in Chepstow, Wales, at the Chepstow Racecourse on February 28, 1996. A report on the event was given in the Glasgow Herald.

Complete results, medallists, and the results of British athletes were published.

== Race results ==
=== Junior men's race (7.8 km) ===
==== Individual ====
Rank	Athlete	Country	Time
1st place, gold medalist(s)	Eric Hulst	United States	23:53.8
2nd place, silver medalist(s)	Thom Hunt	United States	24:06.8
3rd place, bronze medalist(s)	Nat Muir	Scotland	24:17
4	Thierry Watrice	France	24:23
5	Alberto Salazar	United States	24:36
6	Yahia Hadka	Morocco	24:38
7	Nick Lees	England	24:42
8	Don Moses	United States	24:43
9	Santiago Llorente	Spain	24:45
10	Harry Servranckx	Belgium	24:46
11	Marty Froelick	United States	24:47
12	José Luis González	Spain	24:49
13	Volkmar Betz	West Germany	24:50
14	Vesa Laukkanen	Finland	24:51
15	Rafael Nunez	Spain	24:56
16	Enrico Bosca	Italy	24:58
17	Abderrahmane Morceli	Algeria	25:00
18	Abdeslem Jaddor	Morocco	25:01
19	Ralph Serna	United States	25:02
20	Adrian Leek	Wales	25:03
21	Luca Consigli	Italy	25:03
22	Mike Dixon	Canada	25:03
23	Paul Roberts	Canada	25:03
24	Antonio Prieto	Spain	25:03
25	Mathias Plank	West Germany	25:07
26	Jeremy Lothian	England	25:08
27	Nigel Field	England	25:09
28	Mauro Pappacena	Italy	25:11
29	Dirk Vanderherten	Belgium	25:12
30	Harald Hudak	West Germany	25:13
31	Nick Brawn	England	25:17
32	Arturo Iacona	Italy	25:27
33	Mohamed Rajmi	Morocco	25:27
34	Markku Kantola	Finland	25:27
35	Andrew Smith	Scotland	25:29
36	Lyle Kuchmack	Canada	25:31
37	Lasse Mikkelsson	Finland	25:32
38	Francois Willems	Belgium	25:33
39	Terry Goodenough	Canada	25:34
40	José Calderón	Spain	25:35
41	Remigio della Monta	Italy	25:36
42	Kenneth McCartney	Scotland	25:37
43	Abdelrazzak Bounour	Algeria	25:38
44	Anthony Conroy	Ireland	25:39
45	Cyril Donnellan	Ireland	25:40
46	Paul Bettridge	England	25:40
47	Konrad Dobler	West Germany	25:49
48	Alan de Boeck	Belgium	25:56
49	Olivier Arnoux	France	25:58
50	Omar Arab	Morocco	26:02
51	David Carr	Wales	
52	Salim Atache	Algeria	
53	Gilles Garcia	France	
54	Serge Libessart	France	
55	David James	Wales	
56	Lahcene Babaci	Algeria	
57	David Murphy	England	
58	Gerhard Krippner	West Germany	
59	Arto Virtanen	Finland	
60	Francois Santmann	France	
61	Howard Norman	Wales	
62	Tom Lobsinger	Canada	
63	Brian McSloy	Scotland	
64	Ahmed Boutemdjet	Algeria	
65	Abdelaziz Khamel	Morocco	
66	Elie Aubertin	Belgium	
67	Alan Cummings	Wales	
68	Brendan Hillard	Ireland	
69	Charles Haskett	Scotland	
70	Byron Davies	Wales	
71	Peter Butler	Canada	
72	Raine Lehto	Finland	
73	Abdellah Ghabbi	Morocco	
74	Didier Combes	France	
75	Michael Lawther	Northern Ireland	
76	Axel Dietrich	West Germany	
77	Willy Max	Belgium	
78	John Maher	Ireland	
79	James Ross	Northern Ireland	
80	Ray Butler	Northern Ireland	
81	Eddie Patterson	Northern Ireland	

==== Teams ====
Rank	Team	Points
1st place, gold medalist(s)	United States: Eric Hulst / 1; Thom Hunt / 2; Alberto Salazar / 5; Don Moses / 8; (Marty Froelick) / (11); (Ralph Serna) / (19)	16
2nd place, silver medalist(s)	Spain: Santiago Llorente / 9; José Luis González / 12; Rafael Nunez / 15; Antonio Prieto / 24; (José Calderón) / (40)	60
3rd place, bronze medalist(s)	England: Nick Lees / 7; Jeremy Lothian / 26; Nigel Field / 27; Nick Brawn / 31; (Paul Bettridge) / (46); (David Murphy) / (57)	91
4	Italy: Enrico Bosca / 16; Luca Consigli / 21; Mauro Pappacena / 28; Arturo Iacona / 32; (Remigio della Monta) / (41)	97
5	Morocco: Yahia Hadka / 6; Abdeslem Jaddor / 18; Mohamed Rajmi / 33; Omar Arab / 50; (Abdelaziz Khamel) / (65); (Abdellah Ghabbi) / (73)	107
6	West Germany: Volkmar Betz / 13; Mathias Plank / 25; Harald Hudak / 30; Konrad Dobler / 47; (Gerhard Krippner) / (58); (Axel Dietrich) / (76)	115
7	Canada: Mike Dixon / 22; Paul Roberts / 23; Lyle Kuchmack / 36; Terry Goodenough / 39; (Tom Lobsinger) / (62); (Peter Butler) / (71)	120
8	Belgium: Harry Servranckx / 10; Dirk Vanderherten / 29; Francois Willems / 38; Alan de Boeck / 48; (Elie Aubertin) / (66); (Willy Max) / (77)	125
9	Scotland: Nat Muir / 3; Andrew Smith / 35; Kenneth McCartney / 42; Brian McSloy / 63; (Charles Haskett) / (69)	143
10	Finland: Vesa Laukkanen / 14; Markku Kantola / 34; Lasse Mikkelsson / 37; Arto Virtanen / 59; (Raine Lehto) / (72)	144
11	France: Thierry Watrice / 4; Olivier Arnoux / 49; Gilles Garcia / 53; Serge Libessart / 54; (Francois Santmann) / (60); (Didier Combes) / (74)	160
12	Algeria: Abderrahmane Morceli / 17; Abdelrazzak Bounour / 43; Salim Atache / 52; Lahcene Babaci / 56; (Ahmed Boutemdjet) / (64)	168
13	Wales: Adrian Leek / 20; David Carr / 51; David James / 55; Howard Norman / 61; (Alan Cummings) / (67); (Byron Davies) / (70)	187
14	Ireland: Anthony Conroy / 44; Cyril Donnellan / 45; Brendan Hillard / 68; John Maher / 78	235
15	Northern Ireland: Michael Lawther / 75; James Ross / 79; Ray Butler / 80; Eddie Patterson / 81	315

- Note: Athletes in parentheses did not score for the team result

== Participation ==
An unofficial count yields the participation of 81 athletes from 15 countries in the Junior men's race. This is in agreement with the official numbers as published.

- Algeria (5)
- Belgium (6)
- Canada (6)
- England (6)
- Finland (5)
- France (6)
- Ireland (4)
- Italy (5)
- Morocco (6)
- Northern Ireland (4)
- Scotland (5)
- Spain (5)
- United States (6)
- Wales (6)
- West Germany (6)

== See also ==
- 1976 IAAF World Cross Country Championships – Senior men's race
- 1976 IAAF World Cross Country Championships – Senior women's race
