= 1977 IAAF World Cross Country Championships – Junior men's race =

Junior men's race at the 1977 IAAF World Cross Country Championships
- Organisers: IAAF
- Edition: 5th
- Date: March 20
- Host city: Düsseldorf, Nordrhein-Westfalen, West Germany
- Venue: Galopprennbahn Düsseldorf-Grafenberg
- Events: 1
- Distances: 7.5 km – Junior men
- Participation: 81 athletes from 15 nations

The Junior men's race at the 1977 IAAF World Cross Country Championships was held in Düsseldorf, West Germany, at the Galopprennbahn Düsseldorf-Grafenberg on March 20, 1977. A report on the event was given in the Glasgow Herald.

Complete results, medallists, and the results of British athletes were published.

== Race results ==
=== Junior men's race (7.5 km) ===
==== Individual ====
Rank	Athlete	Country	Time
1st place, gold medalist(s)	Thom Hunt	United States	23:15
2nd place, silver medalist(s)	Santiago Llorente	Spain	23:28
3rd place, bronze medalist(s)	Ari Paunonen	Finland	23:39
4	Pierre Délèze	Switzerland	23:43
5	Mark Spilsbury	United States	23:44
6	Nick Lees	England	23:48
7	Peter Butler	Canada	23:49
8	Nat Muir	Scotland	23:55
9	José Manuel Abascal	Spain	23:56
10	Tommy Ekblom	Finland	23:57
11	Rob Evans	Canada	23:58
12	Marty Froelick	United States	24:04
13	Elie Aubertin	Belgium	24:04.6
14	Luis Sastre	Spain	24:05
15	Antonio Prieto	Spain	24:08
16	Robert Swann	England	24:13
17	Paolo Fattori	Italy	24:14
18	Chris Fox	United States	24:19
19	Colin Clarkson	Wales	24:21
20	David Peckham	Canada	24:22
21	Harry Servranckx	Belgium	24:24
22	Hermann Kramer	West Germany	24:27
23	Dave Clarke	England	24:28
24	Domingo Ramón	Spain	24:29
25	Guido de Pauw	Belgium	24:30
26	Volkmar Betz	West Germany	24:32
27	Vesa Kähkölä	Finland	24:33
28	Anthony Conroy	Ireland	24:34
29	Roland Brack	Canada	24:35
30	Philippe Legrand	France	24:36
31	Alfredo Bonetti	Italy	24:37
32	Dirk Mattheus	Belgium	24:38
33	Harold Schulz	United States	24:39
34	Jeff Creer	United States	24:40
35	Mike O'Reilly	England	24:42
36	Alan Cummings	Wales	24:44
37	Gerardo Manso	Spain	24:51
38	Mauro Pappacena	Italy	24:52
39	Brian McSloy	Scotland	24:53
40	Hugh Shakeshaft	Wales	24:54
41	Francois Willems	Belgium	24:55
42	Chris Bunyan	England	24:56
43	Graham Williamson	Scotland	24:57
44	Mick Morton	England	24:58
45	Jürgen Dächert	West Germany	24:59
46	Charles Marr	Scotland	25:00
47	Fernando Miguel	Portugal	25:02
48	James Connell	Ireland	25:04
49	Wolf-Ulrich Schneider	West Germany	25:06
50	Ralf Fleischmann	West Germany	25:08
51	Fulvio Costa	Italy	25:13
52	Adrian Leek	Wales	25:15
53	Nourredine Benamor	Tunisia	25:18
54	Serge Libessart	France	25:19
55	Rob Earl	Canada	25:21
56	Denis Toussaint	France	25:22
57	Ahmen Jerad	Tunisia	25:24
58	Vesa Laukkanen	Finland	25:28
59	Alastair Douglas	Scotland	25:32
60	Vincent Jacot	Switzerland	25:33
61	Markus Joerg	Switzerland	25:34
62	Yvan Eriau	France	25:35
63	Gin Piero Meregaglia	Italy	25:36
64	José Costa	Portugal	25:37
65	Martin Kuster	Switzerland	25:38
66	Raymond Paulins	Canada	25:42
67	Ronny Agten	Belgium	25:43
68	Ian Brown	Scotland	25:44
69	Dominique Vernochet	France	25:47
70	Wahid Ayari	Tunisia	26:03
71	Pascal Brosseau	France	26:08
72	Martin McGeady	Ireland	26:09
73	José Frias	Portugal	26:18
74	Eamonn McMahon	Ireland	26:22
75	João Pereira	Portugal	26:24
76	Arto Virtanen	Finland	26:25
77	Féthi Baccouche	Tunisia	26:26
78	David Ball	Ireland	26:27
79	Roger Butty	Switzerland	27:08
80	James Fallon	Ireland	27:10
—	João Campos	Portugal	DNF

==== Teams ====
Rank	Team	Points
1st place, gold medalist(s)	United States: Thom Hunt / 1; Mark Spilsbury / 5; Marty Froelick / 12; Chris Fox / 18; (Harold Schulz) / (33); (Jeff Creer) / (34)	36
2nd place, silver medalist(s)	Spain: Santiago Llorente / 2; José Manuel Abascal / 9; Luis Sastre / 14; Antonio Prieto / 15; (Domingo Ramón) / (24); (Gerardo Manso) / (37)	40
3rd place, bronze medalist(s)	Canada: Peter Butler / 7; Rob Evans / 11; David Peckham / 20; Roland Brack / 29; (Rob Earl) / (55); (Raymond Paulins) / (66)	67
4	England: Nick Lees / 6; Robert Swann / 16; Dave Clarke / 23; Mike O'Reilly / 35; (Chris Bunyan) / (42); (Mick Morton) / (44)	80
5	Belgium: Elie Aubertin / 13; Harry Servranckx / 21; Guido de Pauw / 25; Dirk Mattheus / 32; (Francois Willems) / (41); (Ronny Agten) / (67)	91
6	Finland: Ari Paunonen / 3; Tommy Ekblom / 10; Vesa Kähkölä / 27; Vesa Laukkanen / 58; (Arto Virtanen) / (76)	98
7	Scotland: Nat Muir / 8; Brian McSloy / 39; Graham Williamson / 43; Charles Marr / 46; (Alastair Douglas) / (59); (Ian Brown) / (68)	136
8	Italy: Paolo Fattori / 17; Alfredo Bonetti / 31; Mauro Pappacena / 38; Fulvio Costa / 51; (Gin Piero Meregaglia) / (63)	137
9	West Germany: Hermann Kramer / 22; Volkmar Betz / 26; Jürgen Dächert / 45; Wolf-Ulrich Schneider / 49; (Ralf Fleischmann) / (50)	142
10	Wales: Colin Clarkson / 19; Alan Cummings / 36; Hugh Shakeshaft / 40; Adrian Leek / 52	147
11	Switzerland: Pierre Délèze / 4; Vincent Jacot / 60; Markus Joerg / 61; Martin Kuster / 65; (Roger Butty) / (79)	190
12	France: Philippe Legrand / 30; Serge Libessart / 54; Denis Toussaint / 56; Yvan Eriau / 62; (Dominique Vernochet) / (69); (Pascal Brosseau) / (71)	202
13	Ireland: Anthony Conroy / 28; James Connell / 48; Martin McGeady / 72; Eamonn McMahon / 74; (David Ball) / (78); (James Fallon) / (80)	222
14	Tunisia: Nourredine Benamor / 53; Ahmen Jerad / 57; Wahid Ayari / 70; Féthi Baccouche / 77	257
15	Portugal: Fernando Miguel / 47; José Costa / 64; José Frias / 73; João Pereira / 75; (João Campos) / (DNF)	259

- Note: Athletes in parentheses did not score for the team result

== Participation ==
An unofficial count yields the participation of 81 athletes from 15 countries in the Junior men's race. This is in agreement with the official numbers as published.

- Belgium (6)
- Canada (6)
- England (6)
- Finland (5)
- France (6)
- Ireland (6)
- Italy (5)
- Portugal (5)
- Scotland (6)
- Spain (6)
- Switzerland (5)
- Tunisia (4)
- United States (6)
- Wales (4)
- West Germany (5)

== See also ==
- 1977 IAAF World Cross Country Championships – Senior men's race
- 1977 IAAF World Cross Country Championships – Senior women's race
