= 1977 IAAF World Cross Country Championships =

- Organisers: IAAF
- Edition: 5th
- Date: 20 March
- Host city: Düsseldorf, Nordrhein-Westfalen, West Germany
- Venue: Galopprennbahn Düsseldorf-Grafenberg
- Events: 3
- Distances: 12.3 km – Senior men 7.5 km – Junior men 5.1 km – Senior women
- Participation: 345 athletes from 22 nations

The 1977 IAAF World Cross Country Championships was held in Düsseldorf, West Germany, at the Galopprennbahn Düsseldorf-Grafenberg on 20 March 1977. A report on the event was given in the Glasgow Herald.

Complete results for men, junior men, women, medallists, and the results of British athletes were published.

== Medallists ==
Event	Gold		Silver		Bronze	
Individual
Senior men (12.3 km)	Léon Schots; Belgium	37:43	Carlos Lopes; Portugal	37:48.2	Detlef Uhlemann; West Germany	37:52.2
Junior men (7.5 km)	Thom Hunt; United States	23:15	Santiago Llorente; Spain	23:28	Ari Paunonen; Finland	23:39
Senior women (5.1 km)	Carmen Valero; Spain	17:26	Lyudmila Bragina; Soviet Union	17:28	Giana Romanova; Soviet Union	17:35
Team
Senior men	Belgium	126	England	129	Soviet Union	144
Junior men	United States	36	Spain	40	Canada	67
Senior women	Soviet Union	15	United States	48	New Zealand	76

== Race results ==
=== Senior men's race (12.3 km) ===
Individual race
Rank	Athlete	Country	Time
1st place, gold medalist(s)	Léon Schots	Belgium	37:43
2nd place, silver medalist(s)	Carlos Lopes	Portugal	37:48.2
3rd place, bronze medalist(s)	Detlef Uhlemann	West Germany	37:52.2
4	Franco Fava	Italy	37:53
5	Bernie Ford	England	37:54
6	Euan Robertson	New Zealand	37:57
7	Karel Lismont	Belgium	38:04
8	Tony Simmons	England	38:12
9	David Black	England	38:13
10	Enn Sellik	Soviet Union	38:15
11	Leonid Moseyev	Soviet Union	38:18
12	Hans-Jürgen Orthmann	West Germany	38:20
Full results

Teams
Rank	Team	Points
1st place, gold medalist(s)	Belgium: Léon Schots / 1; Karel Lismont / 7; Eric De Beck / 18; Willy Polleunis / 22; Frank Grillaert / 27; Eddy Van Mullem / 51; (Eddy Rombaux) / (74); (Paul Thijs) / (154); (Emiel Puttemans) / ( DNF)	126
2nd place, silver medalist(s)	England: Bernie Ford / 5; Tony Simmons / 8; David Black / 9; Steve Kenyon / 29; Barry Smith / 35; Mike McLeod / 43; (Dave Bedford) / (45); (David Slater) / (76); (Jon Wild) / (95)	129
3rd place, bronze medalist(s)	Soviet Union: Enn Sellik / 10; Leonid Moseyev / 11; Vladimir Merkushin / 16; Aleksandr Antipov / 20; Nikolay Radostev / 40; Aleksandr Matveyev / 47; (Ivan Parluy) / (86); (Satimkul Dzhumanazarov) / (88); (Aleksandr Fedotkin) / (92)	144
4	West Germany	226
5	New Zealand	243
6	Australia	260
7	Scotland	270
8	France	311
Full results

- Note: Athletes in parentheses did not score for the team result

=== Junior men's race (7.5 km) ===
Individual race
Rank	Athlete	Country	Time
1st place, gold medalist(s)	Thom Hunt	United States	23:15
2nd place, silver medalist(s)	Santiago Llorente	Spain	23:28
3rd place, bronze medalist(s)	Ari Paunonen	Finland	23:39
4	Pierre Délèze	Switzerland	23:43
5	Mark Spilsbury	United States	23:44
6	Nick Lees	England	23:48
7	Peter Butler	Canada	23:49
8	Nat Muir	Scotland	23:55
9	José Manuel Abascal	Spain	23:56
10	Tommy Ekblom	Finland	23:57
11	Rob Evans	Canada	23:58
12	Marty Froelick	United States	24:04
Full results

Teams
Rank	Team	Points
1st place, gold medalist(s)	United States: Thom Hunt / 1; Mark Spilsbury / 5; Marty Froelick / 12; Chris Fox / 18; (Harold Schulz) / (33); (Jeff Creer) / (34)	36
2nd place, silver medalist(s)	Spain: Santiago Llorente / 2; José Manuel Abascal / 9; Luis Sastre / 14; Antonio Prieto / 15; (Domingo Ramón) / (24); (Gerardo Manso) / (37)	40
3rd place, bronze medalist(s)	Canada: Peter Butler / 7; Rob Evans / 11; David Peckham / 20; Roland Brack / 29; (Rob Earl) / (55); (Raymond Paulins) / (66)	67
4	England	80
5	Belgium	91
6	Finland	98
7	Scotland	136
8	Italy	137
Full results

- Note: Athletes in parentheses did not score for the team result

=== Senior women's race (5.1 km) ===
Individual race
Rank	Athlete	Country	Time
1st place, gold medalist(s)	Carmen Valero	Spain	17:26
2nd place, silver medalist(s)	Lyudmila Bragina	Soviet Union	17:28
3rd place, bronze medalist(s)	Giana Romanova	Soviet Union	17:35
4	Irina Bondarchuk	Soviet Union	17:38
5	Cristina Tomasini	Italy	17:44
6	Raisa Katyukova	Soviet Union	17:46
7	Ann Yeoman	England	17:47
8	Sue Kinsey	United States	17:49
9	Anne Audain	New Zealand	18:00
10	Cornelia Bürki	Switzerland	18:02
11	Kathy Mills	United States	18:03
12	Lyubov Ivanova	Soviet Union	18:05
Full results

Teams
Rank	Team	Points
1st place, gold medalist(s)	Soviet Union: Lyudmila Bragina / 2; Giana Romanova / 3; Irina Bondarchuk / 4; Raisa Katyukova / 6; (Lyubov Ivanova) / (12); (Raisa Sadreydinova) / (25)	15
2nd place, silver medalist(s)	United States: Sue Kinsey / 8; Kathy Mills / 11; Julie Brown / 14; Paula Neppel / 15; (Doris Heritage) / (48); (Eryn Forbes) / (54)	48
3rd place, bronze medalist(s)	New Zealand: Anne Audain / 9; Heather Thomson / 13; Barbara Moore / 24; Irene Miller / 30; (Allison Deed) / (79); (Shirley Somervell) / (88)	76
4	Poland	101
5	England	118
6	West Germany	126
7	Spain	128
8	Finland	136
Full results

- Note: Athletes in parentheses did not score for the team result

== Medal table (unofficial) ==
* Host nation (West Germany)

Rank	Nation	Gold	Silver	Bronze	Total
1	United States (USA)	2	1	0	3
2	Belgium (BEL)	2	0	0	2
3	Spain (ESP)	1	2	0	3
4	Soviet Union (URS)	1	1	2	4
5	England (ENG)	0	1	0	1
5	Portugal (POR)	0	1	0	1
7	Canada (CAN)	0	0	1	1
7	Finland (FIN)	0	0	1	1
7	New Zealand (NZL)	0	0	1	1
7	West Germany (FRG)*	0	0	1	1
Totals (10 entries)		6	6	6	18

- Note: Totals include both individual and team medals, with medals in the team competition counting as one medal.

== Participation ==
An unofficial count yields the participation of 345 athletes from 22 countries, one senior woman athlete less than the official number published.

- Australia (9)
- Belgium (20)
- Canada (18)
- England (21)
- Finland (17)
- France (21)
- Ireland (21)
- Italy (16)
- Netherlands (14)
- New Zealand (15)
- Poland (5)
- Portugal (14)
- Scotland (21)
- Soviet Union (15)
- Spain (21)
- Sudan (2)
- Switzerland (17)
- Sweden (8)
- Tunisia (12)
- United States (21)
- Wales (18)
- West Germany (19)

== See also ==
- 1977 IAAF World Cross Country Championships – Senior men's race
- 1977 IAAF World Cross Country Championships – Junior men's race
- 1977 IAAF World Cross Country Championships – Senior women's race
- 1977 in athletics (track and field)
