= 1987 IAAF World Cross Country Championships – Senior men's race =

Senior men's race at the 1987 IAAF World Cross Country Championships
- Organisers: IAAF
- Edition: 15th
- Date: March 22
- Host city: Warsaw, Poland
- Venue: Służewiec Racecourse
- Events: 1
- Distances: 11.95 km – Senior men
- Participation: 278 athletes from 38 nations

The Senior men's race at the 1987 IAAF World Cross Country Championships was held in Warsaw, Poland, at the Służewiec Racecourse on March 22, 1987. A report on the event was given in the Glasgow Herald and in the Evening Times.

Complete results, medallists, and the results of British athletes were published.

== Race results ==
=== Senior men's race (11.95 km) ===
- Athletes in parentheses did not score for the team result

Individual
Rank	Athlete	Country	Time
1st place, gold medalist(s)	John Ngugi	Kenya	36:07
2nd place, silver medalist(s)	Paul Kipkoech	Kenya	36:07
3rd place, bronze medalist(s)	Paul Arpin	France	36:51
4	Abebe Mekonnen	Ethiopia	36:53
5	Some Muge	Kenya	36:54
6	Andrew Masai	Kenya	37:01
7	Pat Porter	United States	37:04
8	Paul McCloy	Canada	37:08
9	Bruno Le Stum	France	37:09
10	Dave Clarke	England	37:10
11	Steve Moneghetti	Australia	37:11
12	Ed Eyestone	United States	37:11
13	Francesco Panetta	Italy	37:12
14	José Regalo	Portugal	37:13
15	Pierre Levisse	France	37:13
16	John Halvorsen	Norway	37:14
17	Haji Bulbula	Ethiopia	37:14
18	Moses Tanui	Kenya	37:17
19	Vincent Rousseau	Belgium	37:25
20	Carl Thackery	England	37:25
21	Sisa Kirati	Kenya	37:28
22	Kevin Forster	England	37:30
23	Steve Binns	England	37:31
24	Steve Plasencia	United States	37:31
25	Constantino Esparcia	Spain	37:31
26	Gelindo Bordin	Italy	37:33
27	Wodajo Bulti	Ethiopia	37:37
28	Vicente Polo	Spain	37:38
29	Wolde Silasse Melkessa	Ethiopia	37:39
30	David Burridge	New Zealand	37:42
31	Stanley Mandebele	Zimbabwe	37:42
32	Marco Gozzano	Italy	37:43
33	Craig Mochrie	England	37:43
34	Kazuya Nishimoto	Japan	37:43
35	John Woods	Ireland	37:44
36	Severino Bernardini	Italy	37:45
37	Fernando Mamede	Portugal	37:46
38	Jonathan Richards	England	37:47
39	Melese Feissa	Ethiopia	37:48
40	Nat Muir	Scotland	37:49
41	Joaquim Pinheiro	Portugal	37:49
42	Abel Antón	Spain	37:51
43	Tim Hutchings	England	37:51
44	Konrad Dobler	West Germany	37:52
45	Bekele Debele	Ethiopia	37:53
46	Paul Roden	England	37:56
47	Jos Maes	Belgium	37:57
48	Boniface Merande	Kenya	37:57
49	Habib Romdani	Tunisia	37:58
50	Ezequiel Canario	Portugal	37:59
51	El Hachami Abdenouz	Algeria	38:00
52	Arnold Mächler	Switzerland	38:01
53	Habte Negash	Ethiopia	38:01
54	Salvatore Bettiol	Italy	38:02
55	Emmanuel Goulin	France	38:02
56	Fethi Manai	Tunisia	38:03
57	Lars-Erik Nilsson	Sweden	38:04
58	Jarl Gaute Aase	Norway	38:04
59	Martin McLoughlin	England	38:05
60	Krzysztof Wesołowski	Poland	38:08
61	Juan José Rosario	Spain	38:08
62	Franco Boffi	Italy	38:09
63	Dionísio Castro	Portugal	38:10
64	Eddy De Pauw	Belgium	38:11
65	Peter Butler	Canada	38:11
66	Abderrazak Gtari	Tunisia	38:11
67	Samuel Nyangincha	Kenya	38:11
68	Thierry Pantel	France	38:12
69	Martin Vrabel	Czechoslovakia	38:12
70	Chala Urgessa	Ethiopia	38:12
71	Kozu Akutsu	Japan	38:14
72	Ralf Salzmann	West Germany	38:15
73	Erik De Beck	Belgium	38:16
74	Ken Moloney	New Zealand	38:17
75	Shuichi Yoneshige	Japan	38:17
76	John Jenkins	Wales	38:18
77	Mats Erixon	Sweden	38:18
78	Peter Van de Kerkhove	Belgium	38:19
79	Rex Wilson	New Zealand	38:19
80	Mahieddine Belhadj	Algeria	38:20
81	Valentin Rodríguez	Spain	38:22
82	Bogusław Mamiński	Poland	38:26
83	Jan Huruk	Poland	38:27
84	Peter Brett	Australia	38:28
85	Bernd Bürger	West Germany	38:30
86	Helge Dolsvåg	Norway	38:30
87	George Nicholas	United States	38:30
88	Shuzo Nakajima	Japan	38:31
89	Mahmoud Hazzazi	Algeria	38:33
90	Jan Hagelbrand	Sweden	38:34
91	Gregor Cameron	New Zealand	38:34
92	Paul O'Callaghan	Ireland	38:35
93	Tonnie Dirks	Netherlands	38:36
94	Art Boileau	Canada	38:36
95	Jean-Yves Berau	France	38:36
96	Negatu Seyoum	Ethiopia	38:36
97	William Vanhuylenbroek	Belgium	38:37
98	Graeme Fell	Canada	38:37
99	Paul Wheeler	Wales	38:38
100	Roy Dooney	Ireland	38:38
101	Hans-Jürgen Orthmann	West Germany	38:39
102	Abdelhak Henane	Algeria	38:40
103	Santiago Llorente	Spain	38:42
104	António Pinto	Portugal	38:43
105	Aart Stigter	Netherlands	38:44
106	Cándido Alario	Spain	38:45
107	Steve Jones	Wales	38:45
108	Brad Camp	Australia	38:46
109	Rob Lonergan	Canada	38:46
110	Diamantino dos Santos	Brazil	38:46
111	Giuseppe Miccoli	Italy	38:47
112	Zdenek Mezulianik	Czechoslovakia	38:47
113	Doug Cronkite	Canada	38:47
114	Alejandro Gómez	Spain	38:48
115	Spiridon Andreopoulos	Greece	38:49
116	Lasmani Merzougui	Algeria	38:49
117	Marc Borghans	Netherlands	38:49
118	Axel Hardy	West Germany	38:50
119	Sławomir Gurny	Poland	38:50
120	Mike Bishop	Wales	38:50
121	Dag Øxnevad	Norway	38:50
122	Jonny Danielson	Sweden	38:51
123	Vincent Kibiwott	Kenya	38:51
124	Mohamed Difallah	Algeria	38:52
125	Truls Nygaard	Norway	38:52
126	Gianni Demadonna	Italy	38:52
127	David Barney	United States	38:54
128	Peter McColgan	Northern Ireland	38:54
129	Fernando Couto	Portugal	38:55
130	Mohamed Salah Rajhi	Tunisia	38:56
131	Antonio Prieto	Spain	38:57
132	Melusi Ndhlela	Zimbabwe	38:57
133	Farai Kamucheka	Zimbabwe	38:59
134	Chris Buckley	Wales	39:02
135	Willy Goddaert	Belgium	39:03
136	Ieuan Ellis	Wales	39:03
137	Terence Mitchell	Scotland	39:07
138	Jacques Krähenbühl	Switzerland	39:09
139	Gerry Deegan	Ireland	39:09
140	Patric Nilsson	Sweden	39:10
141	Herman Hofstee	Netherlands	39:10
142	Zdenek Moravcik	Czechoslovakia	39:10
143	Alain Bordeleau	Canada	39:12
144	Brahim Ayachi	Tunisia	39:12
145	Bogusław Psujek	Poland	39:14
146	John Robson	Scotland	39:15
147	Pierre-Andre Gobet	Switzerland	39:16
148	Michel Franssen	Netherlands	39:19
149	Chris Robison	Scotland	39:19
150	Cyrille Laventure	France	39:20
151	Rebai Settouh	Algeria	39:20
152	Tommy Murray	Scotland	39:20
153	Tadayoshi Kametaka	Japan	39:22
154	James Fallon	Ireland	39:22
155	David Rush	New Zealand	39:23
156	Adam Hoyle	Australia	39:23
157	Andrzej Malicki	Poland	39:23
158	Oddmund Roalkvam	Norway	39:26
159	Adelaziz Bouguerra	Tunisia	39:26
160	Marius Hasler	Switzerland	39:26
161	Douglas Tolson	United States	39:30
162	Brahim Boudina	Algeria	39:30
163	Miroslav Bauckmann	Czechoslovakia	39:31
164	Kazimierz Lasecki	Poland	39:31
165	Håkan Börjesson	Sweden	39:31
166	Martin Stock	Australia	39:32
167	Niels Kim Hjorth	Denmark	39:33
168	Rainer Gutschank	West Germany	39:34
169	Gentil de Mello	Brazil	39:35
170	Kerry Rodger	New Zealand	39:36
171	Fotios Kourtis	Greece	39:37
172	Nicos Vasiliou	Cyprus	39:38
173	Luis Horta	Portugal	39:39
174	Thierry Watrice	France	39:42
175	James Mutsimba	Zimbabwe	39:43
176	Nicolas Nyengerai	Zimbabwe	39:43
177	Gerard Barrett	Australia	39:44
178	Gerry Craig	Ireland	39:46
179	Chris Tobin	New Zealand	39:48
180	Neil Tennant	Scotland	39:48
181	Charles Haskett	Scotland	39:49
182	Shane Marshall	New Zealand	39:54
183	Khristos Papakhristos	Greece	39:55
184	Satoshi Yano	Japan	39:55
185	Clovis Estevam	Brazil	39:56
186	Alberto Cova	Italy	39:57
187	Konstantin Kyriazis	Greece	39:58
188	Mark Kirk	Northern Ireland	39:59
189	Markus Graf	Switzerland	40:00
190	Deon McNeilly	Northern Ireland	40:01
191	Geoffrey Wade	Northern Ireland	40:03
192	Ross Copestake	Scotland	40:04
193	Norman Tinkham	Canada	40:05
194	Thomas Sørensen	Denmark	40:08
195	Raymond Pannier	France	40:09
196	Allister Hutton	Scotland	40:10
197	Zephaniah Ncube	Zimbabwe	40:10
198	Robert Hodge	United States	40:13
199	Tony Simmons	Wales	40:16
200	Hichem Oueslati	Tunisia	40:19
201	Peter Govaerts	Belgium	40:19
202	Jolar de Azevedo	Brazil	40:20
203	Hari Singh	India	40:21
204	John Christiansen	Denmark	40:24
205	Gerald Neely	Northern Ireland	40:25
206	Emmanuel Handzos	Greece	40:25
207	Elias de Moura	Brazil	40:26
208	Philippe Lahuerte	Canada	40:28
209	Romuald Krupanek	Poland	40:29
210	Richard Mulligan	Ireland	40:29
211	Tomasz Kozłowski	Poland	40:31
212	Brendan Downey	Ireland	40:33
213	Kurt Huerst	Switzerland	40:33
214	Markus Hacksteiner	Switzerland	40:36
215	Ezzedine Amdouni	Tunisia	40:36
216	Zeki Öztürk	Turkey	40:37
217	John McDowell	Northern Ireland	40:39
218	Jamie Harrison	Australia	40:39
219	Anastasiou Psathas	Greece	40:44
220	Jan-Erik Arvidsson	Sweden	40:45
221	Guido Sasse	Netherlands	40:47
222	Chauhan Jagat Singh	India	40:49
223	Randy Reina	United States	40:51
224	Mohamed Hammami	Tunisia	40:57
225	Hsu Gi-Sheng	Chinese Taipei	41:01
226	Gregorio Lavandoski	Brazil	41:06
227	Savas Koubouras	Greece	41:08
228	Basil Brown	Jamaica	41:09
229	Marc van Rooy	Netherlands	41:11
230	Gerard Kiernan	Ireland	41:13
231	Ernie Cunningham	Northern Ireland	41:14
232	Shivkumar Shreshta	India	41:15
233	Amit Ne'eman	Israel	41:31
234	Linton McKenzie	Jamaica	41:37
235	Mohamed Idriss	Egypt	41:39
236	Ashok Kumar	India	41:40
237	Isao Saito	Japan	41:40
238	Surender Pal Singh	India	41:41
239	Prem Singh	India	41:43
240	Fotios Bourkoulas	Greece	41:51
241	Liu Chang-Chung	Chinese Taipei	41:56
242	João Pereira	Brazil	41:58
243	Pyara Singh	India	41:59
244	Derick Adamson	Jamaica	42:03
245	Nigel Adams	Wales	42:05
246	Ho Hsin-Ye	Chinese Taipei	42:06
247	David Lonnen	Northern Ireland	42:08
248	Kenji Ide	Japan	42:21
249	Mark Elliott	Jamaica	42:39
250	Chou Hsien-Kuang	Chinese Taipei	42:48
251	Tim Soutar	Hong Kong	42:56
252	Demetrios Thephylactou	Cyprus	42:57
253	Lee Yin-Sheng	Chinese Taipei	43:05
254	Cebert Cooper	Jamaica	43:12
255	Vasilios Chimonis	Cyprus	43:14
256	Kharalambos Pratsis	Cyprus	43:20
257	Wu Yu-Chia	Chinese Taipei	43:42
258	Kamel Amine Taha	Egypt	43:43
259	John Walsh	Northern Ireland	43:44
260	Mohamed Haremes	Egypt	43:50
261	Efthymious Loizi	Cyprus	43:52
262	Joseph Crossley	Hong Kong	43:55
263	Maurice Szeto-Jan	Hong Kong	44:05
264	Paul Smith	Jamaica	44:13
265	Nikólaos Leonidou	Cyprus	44:18
266	Alvin Bernard	Jamaica	44:23
267	Hsu Kuang-Piao	Chinese Taipei	44:37
268	Wong Chung Man	Hong Kong	45:00
269	Hon Kwai Kwok	Hong Kong	45:13
270	Andreas Anastasoiu	Cyprus	45:24
271	Wong Ip Chor	Hong Kong	45:27
272	Georgios Kyriacou	Cyprus	45:37
273	Wong Sai Hine	Hong Kong	45:39
274	Ming Kuen Hon	Hong Kong	46:31
—	Domingos Castro	Portugal	DNF
—	Peder Poulsen	Sweden	DNF
—	Engelbert Franz	West Germany	DNF
—	Thorsten Jakobsson	Sweden	DNF

Teams
Rank	Team	Points
1st place, gold medalist(s)	Kenya: John Ngugi / 1; Paul Kipkoech / 2; Some Muge / 5; Andrew Masai / 6; Moses Tanui / 18; Sisa Kirati / 21; (Boniface Merande) / (48); (Samuel Nyangincha) / (67); (Vincent Kibiwott) / (123)	53
2nd place, silver medalist(s)	England: Dave Clarke / 10; Carl Thackery / 20; Kevin Forster / 22; Steve Binns / 23; Craig Mochrie / 33; Jonathan Richards / 38; (Tim Hutchings) / (43); (Paul Roden) / (46); (Martin McLoughlin) / (59)	146
3rd place, bronze medalist(s)	Ethiopia: Abebe Mekonnen / 4; Haji Bulbula / 17; Wodajo Bulti / 27; Wolde Silasse Melkessa / 29; Melese Feissa / 39; Bekele Debele / 45; (Habte Negash) / (53); (Chala Urgessa) / (70); (Negatu Seyoum) / (96)	161
4	Italy: Francesco Panetta / 13; Gelindo Bordin / 26; Marco Gozzano / 32; Severino Bernardini / 36; Salvatore Bettiol / 54; Franco Boffi / 62; (Giuseppe Miccoli) / (111); (Gianni Demadonna) / (126); (Alberto Cova) / (186)	223
5	France: Paul Arpin / 3; Bruno Le Stum / 9; Pierre Levisse / 15; Emmanuel Goulin / 55; Thierry Pantel / 68; Jean-Yves Berau / 95; (Cyrille Laventure) / (150); (Thierry Watrice) / (174); (Raymond Pannier) / (195)	245
6	Portugal: José Regalo / 14; Fernando Mamede / 37; Joaquim Pinheiro / 41; Ezequiel Canario / 50; Dionísio Castro / 63; António Pinto / 104; (Fernando Couto) / (129); (Luis Horta) / (173); (Domingos Castro) / (DNF)	309
7	Spain: Constantino Esparcia / 25; Vicente Polo / 28; Abel Antón / 42; Juan José Rosario / 61; Valentin Rodríguez / 81; Santiago Llorente / 103; (Cándido Alario) / (106); (Alejandro Gómez) / (114); (Antonio Prieto) / (131)	340
8	Belgium: Vincent Rousseau / 19; Jos Maes / 47; Eddy de Pauw / 64; Eric de Beck / 73; Peter Van de Kerkhove / 78; Willy van Huylenbroeck / 97; (Willy Goddaert) / (135); (Peter Govaerts) / (201)	378
9	United States: Pat Porter / 7; Ed Eyestone / 12; Steve Plasencia / 24; George Nicholas / 87; David Barney / 127; Douglas Tolson / 161; (Robert Hodge) / (198); (Randy Reina) / (223)	418
10	Canada: Paul McCloy / 8; Peter Butler / 65; Art Boileau / 94; Graeme Fell / 98; Rob Lonergan / 109; Doug Cronkite / 113; (Alain Bordeleau) / (143); (Norman Tinkham) / (193); (Philippe Lahuerte) / (208)	487
11	Algeria: El Hachami Abdenouz / 51; Mahieddine Belhadj / 80; Mahmoud Hazzazi / 89; Abdelhak Henane / 102; Lasmani Merzougui / 116; Mohamed Difallah / 124; (Rebai Settouh) / (151); (Brahim Boudina) / (162)	562
12	Norway: John Halvorsen / 16; Jarl Gaute Aase / 58; Helge Dolsvåg / 86; Dag Øxnevad / 121; Truls Nygaard / 125; Oddmund Roalkvam / 158	564
13	West Germany: Konrad Dobler / 44; Ralf Salzmann / 72; Bernd Bürger / 85; Hans-Jürgen Orthmann / 101; Axel Hardy / 118; Rainer Gutschank / 168; (Engelbert Franz) / (DNF)	588
14	New Zealand: David Burridge / 30; Ken Moloney / 74; Rex Wilson / 79; Gregor Cameron / 91; David Rush / 155; Kerry Rodger / 170; (Chris Tobin) / (179); (Shane Marshall) / (182)	599
15	Tunisia: Habib Romdani / 49; Fethi Manai / 56; Abderrazak Gtari / 66; Mohamed Salah Rajhi / 130; Brahim Ayachi / 144; Adelaziz Bouguerra / 159; (Hichem Oueslati) / (200); (Ezzedine Amdouni) / (215); (Mohamed Hammami) / (224)	604
16	Japan: Kazuya Nishimoto / 34; Kozu Akutsu / 71; Shuichi Yoneshige / 75; Shuzo Nakajima / 88; Tadayoshi Kametaka / 153; Satoshi Yano / 184; (Isao Saito) / (237); (Kenji Ide) / (248)	605
17	Poland: Krzysztof Wesołowski / 60; Bogusław Mamiński / 82; Jan Huruk / 83; Sławomir Gurny / 119; Bogusław Psujek / 145; Andrzej Malicki / 157; (Kazimierz Lasecki) / (164); (Romuald Krupanek) / (209); (Tomasz Kozłowski) / (211)	646
18	Sweden: Lars-Erik Nilsson / 57; Mats Erixon / 77; Jan Hagelbrand / 90; Jonny Danielson / 122; Patric Nilsson / 140; Håkan Börjesson / 165; (Jan-Erik Arvidsson) / (220); (Peder Poulsen) / (DNF); (Thorsten Jakobsson) / (DNF)	651
19	Wales: John Jenkins / 76; Paul Wheeler / 99; Steve Jones / 107; Mike Bishop / 120; Chris Buckley / 134; Ieuan Ellis / 136; (Tony Simmons) / (199); (Nigel Adams) / (245)	672
20	Ireland: John Woods / 35; Paul O'Callaghan / 92; Roy Dooney / 100; Gerry Deegan / 139; James Fallon / 154; Gerry Craig / 178; (Richard Mulligan) / (210); (Brendan Downey) / (212); (Gerard Kiernan) / (230)	698
21	Australia: Steve Moneghetti / 11; Peter Brett / 84; Brad Camp / 108; Adam Hoyle / 156; Martin Stock / 166; Gerard Barrett / 177; (Jamie Harrison) / (218)	702
22	Scotland: Nat Muir / 40; Terence Mitchell / 137; John Robson / 146; Chris Robison / 149; Tommy Murray / 152; Neil Tennant / 180; (Charles Haskett) / (181); (Ross Copestake) / (192); (Allister Hutton) / (196)	804
23	Netherlands: Tonnie Dirks / 93; Aart Stigter / 105; Marc Borghans / 117; Herman Hofstee / 141; Michel Franssen / 148; Guido Sasse / 221; (Marc van Rooy) / (229)	825
24	Zimbabwe: Stanley Mandebele / 31; Melusi Ndhlela / 132; Farai Kamucheka / 133; James Mutsimba / 175; Nicolas Nyengerai / 176; Zephaniah Ncube / 197	844
25	Switzerland: Arnold Mächler / 52; Jacques Krähenbühl / 138; Pierre-Andre Gobet / 147; Marius Hasler / 160; Markus Graf / 189; Kurt Huerst / 213; (Markus Hacksteiner) / (214)	899
26	Greece: Spiridon Andreopoulos / 115; Fotios Kourtis / 171; Khristos Papakhristos / 183; Konstantin Kyriazis / 187; Emmanuel Handzos / 206; Anastasiou Psathas / 219; (Savas Koubouras) / (227); (Fotios Bourkoulas) / (240)	1081
27	Brazil: Diamantino dos Santos / 110; Gentil de Mello / 169; Clovis Estevam / 185; Jolar de Azevedo / 202; Elias de Moura / 207; Gregorio Lavandoski / 226; (João Pereira) / (242)	1099
28	Northern Ireland: Peter McColgan / 128; Mark Kirk / 188; Deon McNeilly / 190; Geoffrey Wade / 191; Gerald Neely / 205; John McDowell / 217; (Ernie Cunningham) / (231); (David Lonnen) / (247); (John Walsh) / (259)	1119
29	India: Hari Singh / 203; Chauhan Jagat Singh / 222; Shivkumar Shreshta / 232; Ashok Kumar / 236; Surender Pal Singh / 238; Prem Singh / 239; (Pyara Singh) / (243)	1370
30	Cyprus: Nicos Vasiliou / 172; Demetrios Thephylactou / 252; Vasilios Chimonis / 255; Kharalambos Pratsis / 256; Efthymious Loizi / 261; Nikólaos Leonidou / 265; (Andreas Anastasoiu) / (270); (Georgios Kyriacou) / (272)	1461
31	Chinese Taipei: Hsu Gi-Sheng / 225; Liu Chang-Chung / 241; Ho Hsin-Ye / 246; Chou Hsien-Kuang / 250; Lee Yin-Sheng / 253; Wu Yu-Chia / 257; (Hsu Kuang-Piao) / (267)	1472
32	Jamaica: Basil Brown / 228; Linton McKenzie / 234; Derick Adamson / 244; Mark Elliott / 249; Cebert Cooper / 254; Paul Smith / 264; (Alvin Bernard) / (266)	1473
33	Hong Kong: Tim Soutar / 251; Joseph Crossley / 262; Maurice Szeto-Jan / 263; Wong Chung Man / 268; Hon Kwai Kwok / 269; Wong Ip Chor / 271; (Wong Sai Hine) / (273); (Ming Kuen Hon) / (274)	1584

== Participation ==
An unofficial count yields the participation of 278 athletes from 38 countries in the Senior men's race. This is in agreement with the official numbers as published.

- Algeria (8)
- Australia (7)
- Belgium (8)
- Brazil (7)
- Canada (9)
- Chinese Taipei (7)
- Cyprus (8)
- Czechoslovakia (4)
- Denmark (3)
- Egypt (3)
- England (9)
- Ethiopia (9)
- France (9)
- Greece (8)
- Hong Kong (8)
- India (7)
- Ireland (9)
- Israel (1)
- Italy (9)
- Jamaica (7)
- Japan (8)
- Kenya (9)
- Netherlands (7)
- New Zealand (8)
- Northern Ireland (9)
- Norway (6)
- Poland (9)
- Portugal (9)
- Scotland (9)
- Spain (9)
- Sweden (9)
- Switzerland (7)
- Tunisia (9)
- Turkey (1)
- United States (8)
- Wales (8)
- West Germany (7)
- Zimbabwe (6)

== See also ==
- 1987 IAAF World Cross Country Championships – Junior men's race
- 1987 IAAF World Cross Country Championships – Senior women's race
