= Ralph Serna =

American long-distance runner

Personal information
- Nationality: American
- Born: January 10, 1957 Anaheim, California

Sport
- Sport: Cross country, track, distance running
- Event(s): Mile, 2-mile, 5000 meters, 10,000 meters, marathon
- College team: UC Irvine

Achievements and titles
- Personal best: Marathon: 2:14:16

Ralph Serna (born January 10, 1957) is a former long-distance runner. He was one of the most prolific high school distance runners in the late 1970s when he competed with Loara High School from his hometown, Anaheim in California. During this time he joined the rivalry between a notable generation of California high school runners, including the likes of Eric Hulst and Thom Hunt. Serna went on to represent the United States at the IAAF World Cross Country Championships in 1975 and 1976, and also had a collegiate spell with University of California, Irvine.

== Running career ==
=== High school ===
Serna attended Loara High School of Orange County, California, and competed in cross country and track in a time when California was the national hub of the high school distance running scene. Serna's reputation for leading races and the disproportionate amount of talented distance runners among Californian highschoolers accumulated to storied rivalries between Serna, Eric Hulst, Thom Hunt, and others. In the 1974 National Postal 2-mile cross country race, Serna placed first with a time of 8:56 in a loaded field (the National Postal was the only national-class high school cross country meet at the time), ahead of fellow Californian Eric Hulst. At the 1975 CIF California State Meet, Serna ran the fastest non-winning two-mile time in US high school history, in a time 8:45.90 (less than a second slower than winner Eric Hulst). When Serna graduated from Loara High School, his personal best time in the mile was 4:07.

=== Collegiate ===
Serna ran for UC Irvine, where he would become teammates with former high school rival Eric Hulst. While at UC Irvine, Serna's best times were 14:01.0 in the 5000 meters and 30:13.06 in the 10,000 meters. However, on a cross country 10K course, Serna recorded 29:51.28 at the 1976 NCAA DI Cross Country Championships.

=== Post-collegiate ===
Serna had a chronic injury issue later in his running career. He finished in 18th place at the 1981 Boston Marathon in 2:14:16, easily surpassing the Olympic "A" standard for the marathon. In the 1982 New York City Marathon, Serna ran 2:14:22 and placed eleventh overall. At the 1984 Mt. SAC Relays, Serna placed 16th overall in the men's 10,000 meters in a time of 29:02.1. He qualified for the 1984 US Olympic Trials for the marathon, but did not run the trials due to a problem with his Achilles tendon.
