= 1977 IAAF World Cross Country Championships – Senior men's race =

Senior men's race at the 1977 IAAF World Cross Country Championships
- Organisers: IAAF
- Edition: 5th
- Date: March 20
- Host city: Düsseldorf, Nordrhein-Westfalen, West Germany
- Venue: Galopprennbahn Düsseldorf-Grafenberg
- Events: 1
- Distances: 12.3 km – Senior men
- Participation: 168 athletes from 21 nations

The Senior men's race at the 1977 IAAF World Cross Country Championships was held in Düsseldorf, West Germany, at the Galopprennbahn Düsseldorf-Grafenberg on March 20, 1977. A report on the event was given in the Glasgow Herald.

Complete results, medallists, and the results of British athletes were published.

== Race results ==
=== Senior men's race (12.3 km) ===
==== Individual ====
Rank	Athlete	Country	Time
1st place, gold medalist(s)	Léon Schots	Belgium	37:43
2nd place, silver medalist(s)	Carlos Lopes	Portugal	37:48.2
3rd place, bronze medalist(s)	Detlef Uhlemann	West Germany	37:52.2
4	Franco Fava	Italy	37:53
5	Bernie Ford	England	37:54
6	Euan Robertson	New Zealand	37:57
7	Karel Lismont	Belgium	38:04
8	Tony Simmons	England	38:12
9	David Black	England	38:13
10	Enn Sellik	Soviet Union	38:15
11	Leonid Moseyev	Soviet Union	38:18
12	Hans-Jürgen Orthmann	West Germany	38:20
13	Mariano Haro	Spain	38:24
14	Allister Hutton	Scotland	38:25
15	Steve Austin	Australia	38:25
16	Vladimir Merkushin	Soviet Union	38:27
17	Noel Tijou	France	38:28
18	Eric De Beck	Belgium	38:29
19	Michael Karst	West Germany	38:30
20	Aleksandr Antipov	Soviet Union	38:32
21	Gerry Deegan	Ireland	38:34
22	Willy Polleunis	Belgium	38:36
23	Chris Wardlaw	Australia	38:39
24	Jeff Wells	United States	38:40
25	Fernando Fernandez	Spain	38:45
26	Luigi Zarcone	Italy	38:50
27	Frank Grillaert	Belgium	38:50
28	Abdelkrim Djelassi	Tunisia	38:50
29	Steve Kenyon	England	38:51
30	Fernando Mamede	Portugal	38:51
31	Pierre Levisse	France	38:51
32	Adelaziz Bouguerra	Tunisia	38:51
33	Jack Foster	New Zealand	38:51
34	Gerard Barrett	Australia	38:51
35	Barry Smith	England	38:51
36	Jim Brown	Scotland	38:52
37	Rob de Castella	Australia	38:52
38	Dan Glans	Sweden	38:52
39	Howard Healey	New Zealand	38:52
40	Nikolay Radostev	Soviet Union	38:52
41	Laurence Reilly	Scotland	38:52
42	Gary Tuttle	United States	38:52
43	Mike McLeod	England	38:53
44	Jos Hermens	Netherlands	38:53
45	Dave Bedford	England	38:53
46	John Dixon	New Zealand	38:53
47	Aleksandr Matveyev	Soviet Union	38:53
48	Werner Meier	Switzerland	38:53
49	Andrew McKean	Scotland	38:53
50	Jean-Luc Paugam	France	38:53
51	Eddy Van Mullem	Belgium	38:54
52	Ulf-Håkan Spik	Finland	38:54.2
53	Günther Zahn	West Germany	38:54.4
54	David Sirl	New Zealand	38:54.6
55	Shag Musa Medani	Sudan	38:54.6
56	Ricardo Ortega	Spain	38:54.8
57	Rabah Zaidi	Tunisia	38:54.8
58	Mansour Guettaya	Tunisia	38:55
59	Lucien Rault	France	38:55.2
60	Bernie Plain	Wales	38:55.4
61	Brian Lewry	Australia	38:55.6
62	Rees Ward	Scotland	38:55.8
63	Mohamed Zaidi	Tunisia	38:55.8
64	Michael Lederer	West Germany	38:55.8
65	Paul Ballinger	New Zealand	38:55.8
66	Aniceto Simoes	Portugal	38:56
67	Danny McDaid	Ireland	38:56.2
68	Paul Kenney	Scotland	38:56.4
69	Seppo Nikkari	Finland	38:56.4
70	Pär Wallin	Sweden	38:56.6
71	Piet Vonck	Netherlands	38:56.8
72	Santiago de la Parte	Spain	38:56.8
73	Pierre Liardet	France	38:57
74	Eddy Rombaux	Belgium	38:57.2
75	Jochen Schirmer	West Germany	38:57.4
76	David Slater	England	39:00
77	Antonio Campos	Spain	39:04
78	Carlos Cabral	Portugal	39:08
79	Mike Bordell	United States	39:12
80	Markus Ryffel	Switzerland	39:16
81	Michel Lelut	France	39:20
82	Mateo Gómez	Spain	39:24
83	Pekka Päivärinta	Finland	39:28
84	Guy Bourban	France	39:32
85	Gilbert Bessières	France	39:36
86	Ivan Parluy	Soviet Union	39:40
87	Werner Grommisch	West Germany	39:44
88	Satimkul Dzhumanazarov	Soviet Union	39:48
89	John Graham	Scotland	39:52
90	Timothy O'Shaughnessy	Australia	40:00
91	Ray Treacy	Ireland	40:00.2
92	Aleksandr Fedotkin	Soviet Union	40:00.4
93	Hussein Soltani	Tunisia	40:00.6
94	John Robson	Scotland	40:01
95	John Wild	England	40:01.2
96	Bruno Lafranchi	Switzerland	40:01.4
97	Bruce Jones	New Zealand	40:01.6
98	Piet Waaning	Netherlands	40:01.8
99	Tom Wysocki	United States	40:01.8
100	Manuel Paiva	Portugal	40:02
101	Paddy Murphy	Ireland	40:02
102	Marco Marchei	Italy	40:03
103	Steve Jones	Wales	40:04
104	Tony Sandoval	United States	40:05
105	José Gil Ramperez	Spain	40:06
106	Jon Anderson	United States	40:11
107	John Sharpe	Canada	40:12
108	Bernhard Vifian	Switzerland	40:13
109	Neil Cusack	Ireland	40:14
110	Helder de Jesús	Portugal	40:15
111	Ric Rojas	United States	40:16
112	Steve Flanagan	United States	40:17
113	Luigi Lauro	Italy	40:18
114	Aarno Ristimäki	Finland	40:19
115	Juhani Sams	Finland	40:20
116	David Chettle	Australia	40:21
117	Padraig Keane	Ireland	40:22
118	Jukka Toivola	Finland	40:23
119	Jo Schout	Netherlands	40:25
120	Gianni Demadonna	Italy	40:27
121	Ali Gammoudi	Tunisia	40:29
122	José de Miguel Bartolome	Spain	40:31
123	Alan Cole	Wales	40:32
124	Carlos Tavares	Portugal	40:33
125	Arturo Iacona	Italy	40:34
126	Blaise Schull	Switzerland	40:35
127	Dic Evans	Wales	40:36
128	Albrecht Moser	Switzerland	40:37
129	Fred Bell	Wales	40:39
130	Estanislao Duran	Spain	40:40
131	Omer Khalifa	Sudan	40:44
132	Roger Robinson (academic)	New Zealand	40:45
133	Cherif Hannchi	Tunisia	40:46
134	Stefan Nilsson	Sweden	40:47
135	Kent Rayner	Australia	40:49
136	Henk Mentink	Netherlands	40:50
137	Trevor Hawes	Wales	40:52
138	Glen Grant	Wales	40:55
139	Vasco Pereira	Portugal	40:57
140	Gerard Nijboer	Netherlands	41:06
141	Lawrie Spence	Scotland	41:08
142	Steve Slocombe	Wales	41:09
143	Anders Borglund	Sweden	41:10
144	Thomas Brennan	Ireland	41:11
145	Bram Wassenaar	Netherlands	41:12
146	Doug Scorrar	Canada	41:14
147	Örjan Wallin	Sweden	41:22
148	Barry Jones	New Zealand	41:23
149	Gerard Kiernan	Ireland	41:24
150	Hugo Wey	Switzerland	41:30
151	Vince Engel	United States	41:31
152	Nil Lavallee	Canada	41:34
153	Gösta Johansson	Sweden	41:35
154	Paul Thijs	Belgium	41:42
155	Mick Morris	Wales	41:44
156	William Smart	Canada	41:46
157	Gunnar Holm	Sweden	41:48
158	Wayne Stewart	Canada	41:55
159	Donal Walsh	Ireland	42:00
160	Klaas Lok	Netherlands	42:35
161	James Langford	Australia	42:45
162	Joe Sax	Canada	42:55
163	Rolf Kårevik	Sweden	43:06
—	Jean-Marie Conrath	France	DNF
—	Karl Fleschen	West Germany	DNF
—	Giuseppe Gerbi	Italy	DNF
—	Anacleto Pinto	Portugal	DNF
—	Emiel Puttemans	Belgium	DNF

==== Teams ====
Rank	Team	Points
1st place, gold medalist(s)	Belgium: Léon Schots / 1; Karel Lismont / 7; Eric De Beck / 18; Willy Polleunis / 22; Frank Grillaert / 27; Eddy Van Mullem / 51; (Eddy Rombaux) / (74); (Paul Thijs) / (154); (Emiel Puttemans) / (DNF)	126
2nd place, silver medalist(s)	England: Bernie Ford / 5; Tony Simmons / 8; David Black / 9; Steve Kenyon / 29; Barry Smith / 35; Mike McLeod / 43; (Dave Bedford) / (45); (David Slater) / (76); (Jon Wild) / (95)	129
3rd place, bronze medalist(s)	Soviet Union: Enn Sellik / 10; Leonid Moseyev / 11; Vladimir Merkushin / 16; Aleksandr Antipov / 20; Nikolay Radostev / 40; Aleksandr Matveyev / 47; (Ivan Parluy) / (86); (Satimkul Dzhumanazarov) / (88); (Aleksandr Fedotkin) / (92)	144
4	West Germany: Detlef Uhlemann / 3; Hans-Jürgen Orthmann / 12; Michael Karst / 19; Günther Zahn / 53; Michael Lederer / 64; Jochen Schirmer / 75; (Werner Grommisch) / (87); (Karl Fleschen) / (DNF)	226
5	New Zealand: Euan Robertson / 6; Jack Foster / 33; Howard Healey / 39; John Dixon / 46; David Sirl / 54; Paul Ballinger / 65; (Bruce Jones) / (97); (Roger Robinson) / (132); (Barry Jones) / (148)	243
6	Australia: Steve Austin / 15; Chris Wardlaw / 23; Gerard Barrett / 34; Rob de Castella / 37; Brian Lewry / 61; Timothy O'Shaughnessy / 90; (David Chettle) / (116); (Kent Rayner) / (135); (James Langford) / (161)	260
7	Scotland: Allister Hutton / 14; Jim Brown / 36; Laurence Reilly / 41; Andrew McKean / 49; Rees Ward / 62; Paul Kenney / 68; (John Graham) / (89); (John Robson) / (94); (Lawrie Spence) / (141)	270
8	France: Noel Tijou / 17; Pierre Levisse / 31; Jean-Luc Paugam / 50; Lucien Rault / 59; Pierre Liardet / 73; Michel Lelut / 81; (Guy Bourban) / (84); (Gilbert Bessières) / (85); (Jean-Marie Conrath) / (DNF)	311
9	Spain: Mariano Haro / 13; Fernando Fernandez / 25; Ricardo Ortega / 56; Santiago de la Parte / 72; Antonio Campos / 77; Mateo Gómez / 82; (José Gil Ramperez) / (105); (José de Miguel Bartolome) / (122); (Estanislao Duran) / (130)	325
10	Tunisia: Abdelkrim Djelassi / 28; Adelaziz Bouguerra / 32; Rabah Zaidi / 57; Mansour Guettaya / 58; Mohamed Zaidi / 63; Hussein Soltani / 93; (Ali Gammoudi) / (121); (Cherif Hannchi) / (133)	331
11	Portugal: Carlos Lopes / 2; Fernando Mamede / 30; Aniceto Simoes / 66; Carlos Cabral / 78; Manuel Paiva / 100; Helder de Jesús / 110; (Carlos Tavares) / (124); (Vasco Pereira) / (139); (Anacleto Pinto) / (DNF)	386
12	United States: Jeff Wells / 24; Gary Tuttle / 42; Mike Bordell / 79; Tom Wysocki / 99; Tony Sandoval / 104; Jon Anderson / 106; (Ric Rojas) / (111); (Steve Flanagan) / (112); (Vince Engel) / (151)	454
13	Italy: Franco Fava / 4; Luigi Zarcone / 26; Marco Marchei / 102; Luigi Lauro / 113; Gianni Demadonna / 120; Arturo Iacona / 125; (Giuseppe Gerbi) / (DNF)	490
14	Ireland: Gerry Deegan / 21; Danny McDaid / 67; Ray Treacy / 91; Paddy Murphy / 101; Neil Cusack / 109; Padraig Keane / 117; (Thomas Brennan) / (144); (Gerard Kiernan) / (149); (Donal Walsh) / (159)	506
15	Finland: Ulf-Håkan Spik / 52; Seppo Nikkari / 69; Pekka Päivärinta / 83; Aarno Ristimäki / 114; Juhani Sams / 115; Jukka Toivola / 118	551
16	Switzerland: Werner Meier / 48; Markus Ryffel / 80; Bruno Lafranchi / 96; Bernhard Vifian / 108; Blaise Schull / 126; Albrecht Moser / 128; (Hugo Wey) / (150)	586
17	Netherlands: Jos Hermens / 44; Piet Vonck / 71; Piet Waaning / 98; Jo Schout / 119; Henk Mentink / 136; Gerard Nijboer / 140; (Bram Wassenaar) / (145); (Klaas Lok) / (160)	608
18	Wales: Bernie Plain / 60; Steve Jones / 103; Alan Cole / 123; Dic Evans / 127; Fred Bell / 129; Trevor Hawes / 137; (Glen Grant) / (138); (Steve Slocombe) / (142); (Mick Morris) / (155)	679
19	Sweden: Dan Glans / 38; Pär Wallin / 70; Stefan Nilsson / 134; Anders Borglund / 143; Örjan Wallin / 147; Gösta Johansson / 153; (Gunnar Holm) / (157); (Rolf Kårevik) / (163)	685
20	Canada: John Sharpe / 107; Doug Scorrar / 146; Nil Lavallee / 152; William Smart / 156; Wayne Stewart / 158; Joe Sax / 162	881

- Note: Athletes in parentheses did not score for the team result

== Participation ==
An unofficial count yields the participation of 168 athletes from 21 countries in the Senior men's race. This is in agreement with the official numbers as published.

- Australia (9)
- Belgium (9)
- Canada (6)
- England (9)
- Finland (6)
- France (9)
- Ireland (9)
- Italy (7)
- Netherlands (8)
- New Zealand (9)
- Portugal (9)
- Scotland (9)
- Soviet Union (9)
- Spain (9)
- Sudan (2)
- Sweden (8)
- Switzerland (7)
- Tunisia (8)
- United States (9)
- Wales (9)
- West Germany (8)

== See also ==
- 1977 IAAF World Cross Country Championships – Junior men's race
- 1977 IAAF World Cross Country Championships – Senior women's race
