= Eric Hulst =

Personal information
- Nationality: American
- Born: November 28, 1957 Laguna Beach, California
- Died: June 21, 1992 (aged 34)

Sport
- Sport: Cross country, track
- Event(s): Mile, 2-mile, 10,000 meters

Achievements and titles
- Personal best(s): Mile: 4:09.1; 2-mile: 8:44.6; 10,000m: 28:55.00
Medal record
Men's athletics
Representing United States
IAAF World Cross Country Championships
Gold medal – first place	1976 Chepstow	Junior men's 7.8K

Eric Hulst (November 28, 1957 - June 21, 1992) was a distance runner who specialized in various cross country and track events. Known for his years in California's high school running scene and for a remarkable training regimen, he represented the United States in international competition and won the gold medal for the United States in the men's junior race at the 1976 IAAF World Cross Country Championships in Chepstow, Wales. Hulst set many California high school records.

== Running career ==
=== High school ===
"He and Serna were perfect rivals. Hulst was rather stocky...Ralph was whippet thin...Hulst was a powerful, bull of a runner...you expected his spikes to rip pieces of Tartan track up and fling them in the air behind him. Serna was a matador, a graceful, elegant, smooth runner...They were Ali and Frazier, the butcher and the surgeon. It was a glorious time."

— Stephen D. Isham

Hulst attended Laguna Beach High School, where he ran cross country and track. Originally, he intended to play tennis, but excelled in his first cross country season and continued from there, running the 2-mile in 9:04.6 (min:sec) as a freshman. At Laguna Beach HS, his coach was Len Miller, who followed a high-mileage coaching philosophy typical of the 1970s and would later coach Hulst at UC-Irvine. Hulst is well-remembered in the running community for his high-volume training regimen. At the age of 15, Hulst frequently logged 100 or more miles per week of training, and would often get up at 5:00 AM to run between 10 and 13 miles before classes started at 8:30. His morning runs would start from his home in Emerald Bay and extend to Corona del Mar and back, and he would frequently carry a four-pound weight in each hand. (He also regularly ran series of sprints up the high school stadium bleachers wearing a 10-pound lead vest.) During the course of his high school career, a competitive rivalry ensued between Hulst and Loara High School standout Ralph Serna. At the 1974 National Postal cross country meet, Hulst placed second in a field of the best high school runners in the country, behind only Serna. Arguably, his most famous high school victory was at the 1975 California Interscholastic Federation state 2-mile championship race, in which he finished in first place in a state high school record time of 8:44.9, one second ahead of Serna; both finished under Rich Kimball's previous record of 8:46.6, set in the previous year's meet. During his senior year of high school, Hulst was called up to the U.S. national squad for the 1976 IAAF World Cross Country Championships, where he won the men's junior race, beating such future standouts as Alberto Salazar and Thom Hunt, as well as Serna. (Their U.S. team won the world title.) As a result, his picture appeared on the cover of the May 1976 issue of Runner's World. Inspired by Dave Wottle, Hulst wore a cap while racing in high school. During that year's track season, he lowered his CIF-SS and state 2-mile record further to 8:44.6 at the CIF-SS Masters Meet and won his second consecutive state championship in the two-mile.

=== Collegiate ===
For a brief time, Hulst attended and ran with UC-Irvine, whose team he helped to win the Division II national cross country championship. He was UC-Irvine's best finisher at the 1976 NCAA DI cross country championships, finishing in 34th overall in the men's 10K race. However, he developed a chronic knee injury while running at UC-Irvine and eventually dropped out of college in his sophomore year.

=== Post-collegiate ===
After having stopped running collegiately, Hulst made a brief return to competitive racing in California's road racing circuit. After notching multiple road wins, he made his last major race appearance at the 1982 Boston Marathon, where he finished in 28th place in a time of 2:20:23.

== Death ==
On an unspecified date in February 1991, Hulst was walking out of a movie theater with his mother when he yawned, after which he could not close his mouth due to random muscle contractions. He was immediately taken to the emergency room, where a cancerous tumor the size of a golf ball was discovered in his brain. He subsequently underwent surgery after which 80 percent of a tumor in his brain was removed. A teammate at UC-Irvine and former Corona del Mar distance standout, Brian Hunsaker, had contracted infectious mononucleosis not long before Hulst was diagnosed, and told the Los Angeles Times that he believed the volume of training he and Hulst did had something to do with it. The remainder of the tumor was intentionally left in order to prevent possible brain damage from excessively invasive surgery. From the winter of 1991, Hulst tried alternative cancer treatment at a facility in Mexico, where his doctors saw noticeable improvements and a lessened frequency of seizures. However, the tumor expanded aggressively a second time, and he died on June 21, 1992. Laguna Beach High School's track facility was officially named after Eric Hulst in his honor.
