= Athletics at the 1981 Summer Universiade – Men's marathon =

The men's marathon at the 1981 Summer Universiade was held in Bucharest on 26 July 1981. It was the first time that this event was held at the Universiade.

== Results ==
| Rank | Athlete | Nationality | Time | Notes |
|---|---|---|---|---|
| 1st place, gold medalist(s) | Ivan Kovalchuk | Soviet Union | 2:22:14 | |
| 2nd place, silver medalist(s) | Herbert Wills | United States | 2:23:22 | |
| 3rd place, bronze medalist(s) | Gheorghe Buruiană | Romania | 2:24:45 | |
| 4 | Ahmet Altun | Turkey | 2:27.52 | |
| 5 | Giampaolo Messina | Italy | 2:29.04 | |
| 6 | Aleksandr Davydov | Soviet Union | 2:30.29 | |
| 7 | Vicente Barrera | Mexico | 2:32.20 | |
| 8 | Alioschka Karuchkov | Bulgaria | 2:37.06 | |
| 9 | Gheorghe Motrca | Romania | 2:42.05 | |
| 10 | Johan Rosseel | Belgium | 2:52.25 | |
| | Vadim Sidorov | Soviet Union | DNF | |
| | Yuriy Pleshkov | Soviet Union | DNF | |
| | Georgi Milanov | Bulgaria | DNF | |
| | Vicente Polo | Spain | DNF | |
| | Constantin Bebreche | Romania | DNF | |
| | Michele Arena | Italy | DNF | |
| | Jorge Pytaio | Mexico | DNF | |
| | Michael Latine | Belgium | DNF | |
| | Mike Cotton | United States | DNF | |
| | Mehmet Terzi | Turkey | DNF | |
| | Francisco Silva | Mexico | DNF | |
| | George Zaharia | Romania | DNF | |
| | Gerardo Alcalá | Mexico | DNF | |
| | Mabil-Boutros Choueiri | Lebanon | DNF | |
| | Martin Pytaio | Mexico | DNF | |
| | Mehmet Yurdadön | Turkey | DNF | |
