= Eric Mastalir =

American sports executive and track athlete (born 1968)

Eric Mastalir (born January 11, 1968) is an American sports executive and former track athlete. He currently leads Enterprise Support Business Development at AWS.

He has a twin brother Mark who duplicated many of the same accomplishments. A native of Sacramento, California, Mastalir attended Jesuit High School. Both brothers had virtually the same, notable personal best in high school, Mark 4:04.15 (the SJS record), Eric 4:04.23 from the same race at the Sac-Joaquin Section meet a week before the State meet. Later in the day, Eric would also set the SJS record in the 3200. A week later, both became state champions at the 1986 CIF California State Meet, Eric winning the 3200 in a meet record 8:44.95 while Mark won the 1600 by almost 4 seconds in 4:07.81. The previous year both brothers had finished behind Roman Gomez in their respective events. He later attended Stanford University, where he was an NCAA All-American in track. Both brothers competed on the United States team at the 1987 IAAF World Cross Country Championships – Junior men's race, Mark finishing 62nd and Eric finishing 100th.
