= Detlef Uhlemann =

German long-distance runner

Medal record

Men's athletics

Representing West Germany

IAAF World Cross Country Championships
Bronze medal – third place	1977 Düsseldorf	Senior race

Detlef Hugo Otto Uhlemann (born 24 September 1949) is a German former long-distance runner who competed for West Germany. Born in the Altenessen district of the city of Essen, he represented his country at the 1976 Summer Olympics, being a finalist in the 5000 metres. He was a member of the LG Bonn/Troisdorf athletics club during his career.

The greatest success of his international career came in cross country running. He was a six-time participant at the IAAF World Cross Country Championships and was a bronze medallist at the 1977 edition (held in his native West Germany) – he was the first German to reach the podium and alongside 1980 medallist Hans-Jürgen Orthmann remains one of only two German senior medallists at the competition. He also ranked in the top five at the 1974 and 1976 editions. A global title came when he won the 1974 World Military Cross Country Championships. He was the world military runner-up in 1975.

Uhlemann also represented West Germany on the track, competing at two European Athletics Championships, and represented Europe at the 1977 IAAF World Cup. He was twice a silver medallist in the 10,000 metres at the European Cup, taking the runner-up spot in 1973 and 1977. He was the 10,000 m champion at the 1976 CISM World Military Track and Field Championships. He was a four-time West German champion in the 10,000 m and also won two national titles in cross country.

On the professional circuit, he was the 1977 winner of the Lotto Cross Cup de Hannut, was runner-up at the 1975 Cursa Jean Bouin, and took second place at the 1976 San Silvestre Vallecana.

== International competitions ==
Year	Competition	Venue	Position	Event	Notes
1973	World Cross Country Championships	Waregem, Belgium	44th	Senior race	?
1973	World Cross Country Championships	Waregem, Belgium	14th	Senior team	508 pts
1973	European Cup	Edinburgh, United Kingdom	2nd	10,000 m	28:44.22
1974	World Cross Country Championships	Monza, Italy	5th	Senior race	35:30.4
1974	World Cross Country Championships	Monza, Italy	4th	Senior team	220 pts
1974	European Championships	Rome, Italy	—	10,000 m	DNF
1974	World Military Cross Country Championships	Rabat, Morocco	1st	Senior race	14:08
1975	World Military Cross Country Championships	Algiers, Algeria	2nd	Senior race	14:51.8
1976	World Cross Country Championships	Chepstow, United Kingdom	5th	Senior race	35:09
1976	World Cross Country Championships	Chepstow, United Kingdom	7th	Senior team	292 pts
1976	Olympic Games	Montreal, Canada	10th	5000 m	13:31.07
1976	Olympic Games	Montreal, Canada	6th (heats)	10,000 m	28:29.28
1976	World Military Track and Field Championships	Rio de Janeiro, Brazil	1st	10,000 m	29:16.8
1977	World Cross Country Championships	Düsseldorf, West Germany	3rd	Senior men	37:52.2
1977	World Cross Country Championships	Düsseldorf, West Germany	4th	Senior team	226 pts
1977	European Cup	Helsinki, Finland	2nd	10,000 m	27:58.79
1977	World Cup	Düsseldorf, West Germany.	4th	10,000 m	28:38.7
1978	European Championships	Prague, Czechoslovakia	—	10,000 m	DNF
1979	World Cross Country Championships	Limerick, Ireland	121st	Senior race	40:21
1981	World Cross Country Championships	Madrid, Spain	67th	Senior race	36:30
1981	World Cross Country Championships	Madrid, Spain	11th	Senior team	475 pts

== National titles ==
- West German Athletics Championships
  - 10,000 metres: 1973, 1974, 1975, 1977
- West German Cross Country Championships
  - Long course: 1974, 1975
