= 1987 IAAF World Cross Country Championships – Junior men's race =

Junior men's race at the 1987 IAAF World Cross Country Championships
- Organisers: IAAF
- Edition: 15th
- Date: March 22
- Host city: Warsaw, Poland
- Venue: Służewiec Racecourse
- Events: 1
- Distances: 7.05 km – Junior men
- Participation: 146 athletes from 29 nations

The Junior men's race at the 1987 IAAF World Cross Country Championships was held in Warsaw, Poland, at the Służewiec Racecourse on March 22, 1987. A report on the event was given in the Glasgow Herald and in the Evening Times.

Complete results, medallists, and the results of British athletes were published.

== Race results ==
=== Junior men's race (7.05 km) ===
==== Individual ====
Rank	Athlete	Country	Time
1st place, gold medalist(s)	Wilfred Kirochi	Kenya	22:18
2nd place, silver medalist(s)	Demeke Bekele	Ethiopia	22:18
3rd place, bronze medalist(s)	Debebe Demisse	Ethiopia	22:20
4	William Koskei Chemitei	Kenya	22:27
5	Mathew Rono	Kenya	22:28
6	Aligaz Alemayehu	Ethiopia	22:28
7	Simon Mugglestone	England	22:33
8	Bedile Kibret	Ethiopia	22:37
9	Ararse Fuffa	Ethiopia	22:39
10	Thomas Osano	Kenya	22:55
11	Abel Gisemba	Kenya	23:01
12	Haydar Dogan	Turkey	23:07
13	Joseph Otwori	Kenya	23:11
14	Kenji Ayabe	Japan	23:13
15	Mourad Bouldjadj	Algeria	23:19
16	Darren Klassen	Canada	23:19
17	Luc Peerlinck	Belgium	23:23
18	Yoshinori Yokota	Japan	23:24
19	Didier Sainthorand	France	23:25
20	Masaki Yamamoto	Japan	23:26
21	Hideyuki Matsumoto	Japan	23:26
22	Zoltán Káldy	Hungary	23:28
23	Todd Williams	United States	23:30
24	Valery Chesak	Soviet Union	23:31
25	Marc Pujol	Spain	23:31
26	Marco Rufo	Spain	23:31
27	Wayne Larden	Australia	23:32
28	Timothy Gargiulo	United States	23:34
29	Robert Henes	United States	23:35
30	Mikhail Puzniak	Soviet Union	23:36
31	Alan Lewis	Canada	23:37
32	David Wilson	Ireland	23:38
33	Luca Barzaghi	Italy	23:40
34	Clayton Clews	Australia	23:40
35	Jesús Gálvez	Spain	23:40
36	Alex Mowatt	Canada	23:44
37	Mohamed Choumassi	Morocco	23:44
38	Giuliano Baccani	Italy	23:45
39	Francisco Rivera	Spain	23:46
40	Marc Davis	United States	23:47
41	Brendan Matthias	Canada	23:48
42	Abdelaziz Mahjoubi	Morocco	23:53
43	James Hynes	Ireland	23:54
44	Moulay Ali Ouadih	Morocco	23:56
45	Marco Di Lieto	Italy	23:56
46	Salem Chilah	Tunisia	23:57
47	Fermín Cacho	Spain	23:58
48	Vladimir Kilnesov	Soviet Union	23:59
49	Zoltán Gergely	Hungary	23:59
50	Martin Amor	England	24:00
51	Greg Andersen	Canada	24:05
52	Mohamed El Bachir	Algeria	24:07
53	Mehmet Bayram	Turkey	24:08
54	Brahim Lahlafi	Morocco	24:09
55	Mauro Biagetti	Italy	24:10
56	Károly Vajkovics	Hungary	24:10
57	Robert Langfeld	West Germany	24:11
58	Nicholas McCaffrey	England	24:11
59	Julian Gentry	England	24:12
60	Miroslaw Plawgo	Poland	24:13
61	Carsten Arndt	West Germany	24:13
62	Mark Mastalir	United States	24:15
63	Tesfayi Dadi	Ethiopia	24:16
64	Bernard Bourke	Australia	24:17
65	Seamus O'Loan	Ireland	24:18
66	Davey Wilson	Northern Ireland	24:18
67	Jan Jonsson	Sweden	24:20
68	Waldemar Glinka	Poland	24:21
69	Valeriy Fedotov	Soviet Union	24:21
70	Markus Tischler	West Germany	24:21
71	Fabian Lacan	France	24:22
72	Amar Ouerfelli	Tunisia	24:22
73	Rik Stepman	Belgium	24:22
74	Abderrahim Cherkaoui	Morocco	24:23
75	Remzi Atli	Turkey	24:24
76	Zoltán Holba	Hungary	24:24
77	Justin Hobbs	Wales	24:25
78	Philip Hennessy	England	24:26
79	Laurent Delacenserie	France	24:26
80	Ali Canpolat	Turkey	24:27
81	Christoph Ruettiman	Switzerland	24:28
82	Tayeb Benaiche	Algeria	24:29
83	Andrew Edge	Wales	24:30
84	Alastair Russell	Scotland	24:30
85	Riyouki Murakami	Japan	24:31
86	Rafal Walczak	Poland	24:32
87	Kevin McKay	England	24:33
88	Marc Vanderstraeten	Belgium	24:33
89	Wilfried Liers	Belgium	24:34
90	Nick Tsioros	Canada	24:34
91	Jonas Larsson	Sweden	24:36
92	Yohinori Sato	Japan	24:37
93	Allan Carman	Australia	24:38
94	Geoffrey Sheehan	Ireland	24:40
95	Mariusz Lamch	Poland	24:40
96	Mabrouk Trimèche	Algeria	24:41
97	Lotfi Aoua	Tunisia	24:43
98	Bousmaha Saidi	Algeria	24:43
99	Bernd Jähnke	West Germany	24:45
100	Eric Mastalir	United States	24:47
101	Luigi Teodori	Italy	24:48
102	Talat Gökce	Turkey	24:50
103	Craig McFadzean	Scotland	24:51
104	Mickael Dufermont	France	24:55
105	Niklas Johnsson	Sweden	24:56
106	Ferenc Sági	Hungary	24:57
107	Bobby Farren	Northern Ireland	24:58
108	Dean Rose	Australia	24:59
109	David Jones	Ireland	24:59
110	Yaswant Rawat Singh	India	24:59
111	Anatoliy Dimitrov	Soviet Union	25:00
112	Juan Abad	Spain	25:00
113	Lars Richter	West Germany	25:03
114	Azzedine Sakhri	Algeria	25:04
115	Robert Jay	Wales	25:06
116	Jamal Ali Al-Hakim	North Yemen	25:08
117	Naceur Hamed	Tunisia	25:09
118	Justin Chaston	Wales	25:10
119	Andreas Ahl	Sweden	25:11
120	Szabolcs Jámbor	Hungary	25:12
121	David Beyssac	France	25:13
122	Wendy Hermans	Belgium	25:14
123	Slim Chérif	Tunisia	25:16
124	Mark Wallace	Scotland	25:17
125	Per Stjernberg	Sweden	25:18
126	Hardev Singh	India	25:18
127	Mel Hilliard	Ireland	25:24
128	Hans van der Hoeven	Belgium	25:25
129	Radek Bily	Czechoslovakia	25:25
130	Gennaro Di Napoli	Italy	25:29
131	Slawomir Swieczkowski	Poland	25:31
132	Cairan McGivern	Northern Ireland	25:34
133	Piotr Prusik	Poland	25:35
134	Hukum Singh	India	25:35
135	Mohamed Nasser Al-Zaidi	North Yemen	25:39
136	Declan Caddell	Northern Ireland	25:42
137	Jan Arvidsson	Sweden	25:44
138	David Donnett	Scotland	25:49
139	Philip Healey	Northern Ireland	25:51
140	David Arnott	Scotland	25:59
141	Steven Tagg	Australia	26:17
142	Ithai Luria	Israel	26:17
143	Stuart Kennedy	Northern Ireland	26:18
144	Dafydd Hughes	Wales	26:24
145	John Quinn	Scotland	26:28
146	Gerallt Owen	Wales	27:30

==== Teams ====
Rank	Team	Points
1st place, gold medalist(s)	Ethiopia: Demeke Bekele / 2; Debebe Demisse / 3; Aligaz Alemayehu / 6; Bedile Kibret / 8; (Ararse Fuffa) / (9); (Tesfayi Dadi) / (63)	19
2nd place, silver medalist(s)	Kenya: Wilfred Kirochi / 1; William Koskei Chemitei / 4; Mathew Rono / 5; Thomas Osano / 10; (Abel Gisemba) / (11); (Joseph Otwori) / (13)	20
3rd place, bronze medalist(s)	Japan: Kenji Ayabe / 14; Yoshinori Yokota / 18; Masaki Yamamoto / 20; Hideyuki Matsumoto / 21; (Riyouki Murakami) / (85); (Yohinori Sato) / (92)	73
4	United States: Todd Williams / 23; Timothy Gargiulo / 28; Robert Henes / 29; Marc Davis / 40; (Mark Mastalir) / (62); (Eric Mastalir) / (100)	120
5	Canada: Darren Klassen / 16; Alan Lewis / 31; Alex Mowatt / 36; Brendan Matthias / 41; (Greg Andersen) / (51); (Nick Tsioros) / (90)	124
6	Spain: Marc Pujol / 25; Marco Rufo / 26; Jesús Gálvez / 35; Francisco Rivera / 39; (Fermín Cacho) / (47); (Juan Abad) / (112)	125
7	Italy: Luca Barzaghi / 33; Giuliano Baccani / 38; Marco Di Lieto / 45; Mauro Biagetti / 55; (Luigi Teodori) / (101); (Gennaro Di Napoli) / (130)	171
8	Soviet Union: Valery Chesak / 24; Mikhail Puzniak / 30; Vladimir Kilnesov / 48; Valeriy Fedotov / 69; (Anatoliy Dimitrov) / (111)	171
9	England: Simon Mugglestone / 7; Martin Amor / 50; Nicholas McCaffrey / 58; Julian Gentry / 59; (Philip Hennessy) / (78); (Kevin McKay) / (87)	174
10	Morocco: Mohamed Choumassi / 37; Abdelaziz Mahjoubi / 42; Moulay Ali Ouadih / 44; Brahim Lahlafi / 54; (Abderrahim Cherkaoui) / (74)	177
11	Hungary: Zoltán Káldy / 22; Zoltán Gergely / 49; Károly Vajkovics / 56; Zoltán Holba / 76; (Ferenc Sági) / (106); (Szabolcs Jámbor) / (120)	203
12	Australia: Wayne Larden / 27; Clayton Clews / 34; Bernard Bourke / 64; Allan Carman / 93; (Dean Rose) / (108); (Steven Tagg) / (141)	218
13	Turkey: Haydar Dogan / 12; Mehmet Bayram / 53; Remzi Atli / 75; Ali Canpolat / 80; (Talat Gökce) / (102)	220
14	Ireland: David Wilson / 32; James Hynes / 43; Seamus O'Loan / 65; Geoffrey Sheehan / 94; (David Jones) / (109); (Mel Hilliard) / (127)	234
15	Algeria: Mourad Bouldjadj / 15; Mohamed El Bachir / 52; Tayeb Benaiche / 82; Mabrouk Trimèche / 96; (Bousmaha Saidi) / (98); (Azzedine Sakhri) / (114)	245
16	Belgium: Luc Peerlinck / 17; Rik Stepman / 73; Marc Vanderstraeten / 88; Wilfried Liers / 89; (Wendy Hermans) / (122); (Hans van der Hoeven) / (128)	267
17	France: Didier Sainthorand / 19; Fabian Lacan / 71; Laurent Delacenserie / 79; Mickael Dufermont / 104; (David Beyssac) / (121)	273
18	West Germany: Robert Langfeld / 57; Carsten Arndt / 61; Markus Tischler / 70; Bernd Jähnke / 99; (Lars Richter) / (113)	287
19	Poland: Miroslaw Plawgo / 60; Waldemar Glinka / 68; Rafal Walczak / 86; Mariusz Lamch / 95; (Slawomir Swieczkowski) / (131); (Piotr Prusik) / (133)	309
20	Tunisia: Salem Chilah / 46; Amar Ouerfelli / 72; Lotfi Aoua / 97; Naceur Hamed / 117; (Slim Chérif) / (123)	332
21	Sweden: Jan Jonsson / 67; Jonas Larsson / 91; Niklas Johnsson / 105; Andreas Ahl / 119; (Per Stjernberg) / (125); (Jan Arvidsson) / (137)	382
22	Wales: Justin Hobbs / 77; Andrew Edge / 83; Robert Jay / 115; Justin Chaston / 118; (Dafydd Hughes) / (144); (Gerallt Owen) / (146)	393
23	Northern Ireland: Davey Wilson / 66; Bobby Farren / 107; Cairan McGivern / 132; Declan Caddell / 136; (Philip Healey) / (139); (Stuart Kennedy) / (143)	441
24	Scotland: Alastair Russell / 84; Craig McFadzean / 103; Mark Wallace / 124; David Donnett / 138; (David Arnott) / (140); (John Quinn) / (145)	449

- Note: Athletes in parentheses did not score for the team result

== Participation ==
An unofficial count yields the participation of 146 athletes from 29 countries in the Junior men's race. This is in agreement with the official numbers as published.

- Algeria (6)
- Australia (6)
- Belgium (6)
- Canada (6)
- Czechoslovakia (1)
- England (6)
- Ethiopia (6)
- France (5)
- Hungary (6)
- India (3)
- Ireland (6)
- Israel (1)
- Italy (6)
- Japan (6)
- Kenya (6)
- Morocco (5)
- Northern Ireland (6)
- North Yemen (2)
- Poland (6)
- Scotland (6)
- Soviet Union (5)
- Spain (6)
- Sweden (6)
- Switzerland (1)
- Tunisia (5)
- Turkey (5)
- United States (6)
- Wales (6)
- West Germany (5)

== See also ==
- 1987 IAAF World Cross Country Championships – Senior men's race
- 1987 IAAF World Cross Country Championships – Senior women's race
