= Frank Grillaert =

Belgian long-distance runner (1946–2023)

Personal information
- Born: 22 October 1946
- Died: 23 February 2023 (aged 76)

Sport
- Country: Belgium
- Sport: Athletics
- Event: Cross country running

Achievements and titles
- Personal best: 10,000 m: 28:43.5 (1978)
Medal record
Men's athletics
Representing Belgium
World Cross Country Championships
Gold medal – first place	1974 Monza	Senior team
Gold medal – first place	1977 Düsseldorf	Senior team
Bronze medal – third place	1980 Paris	Senior team
International Cross Country Championships
Bronze medal – third place	1972 Cambridge	Senior team

François Grillaert (22 October 1946 – 23 February 2023) was a Belgian long-distance runner. He was the team gold medalist in the men's race at the 1974 and 1977 World Cross Country Championships. He was also the 1977 Belgian national champion in the 10,000 metres.

== Career ==
In 1971, Grillaert won the '2nd-category' 5000 metres title at the Belgian Athletics Championships. During his career, he won several national titles and achieved a podium finish at the Memorial Van Damme athletics meet.

He was 57th in the men's race at the 1972 International Cross Country Championships, earning a bronze medal with the Belgian team.

At the 1974 World Cross Country Championships, Grillaert was 27th in the senior race. He was the 5th scorer for Belgium, which won the team gold medal.

Grillaert won the 1977 Belgian Athletics Championships 10,000 metres race. He competed in the 1977 European Cup semi-final 10,000 m, where he was out-sprinted by John Treacy for third place. He returned at the 1977 World Cross Country Championships, finishing 27th and again winning the team gold medal.

At the 1978 Belgian Athletics Championships, Grillaert was 16th in the 10,000 m. He was one of three Belgians selected to compete in the 1978 European Championships 10,000 m. In the race, he finished 16th in 28:43.5 minutes, setting a personal best.

In 1979, Grillaert was runner-up at the Belgian Cross Country Championships. He was 19th individually at the 1979 World Cross Country Championships, contributing to his Belgian team's 5th-place finish.

Gillaert was 4th at the 1980 Saint Silvester Road Race. In his final World Cross Country appearance, Grillaert was 44th in the 1980 senior race. He won a bronze medal as the 5th scorer for Belgium.

== Personal life ==
Grillaert was born on 22 October 1946 and was from Hamme, East Flanders, Belgium. He ran for Atletiekclub Hamme VZW (AC Hamme) and later switched to Antwerp Atletiekclub. He was known for his moustache and light running style.

He died on 23 February 2023.
