= Hans-Jürgen Orthmann =

German long-distance runner

Medal record

Men's athletics

Representing West Germany

IAAF World Cross Country Championships
| Silver medal – second place | 1980 Paris | Senior race |

European Athletics Indoor Championships
| Bronze medal – third place | 1980 Sindelfingen | 3000 m |

Hans-Jürgen Orthmann (born 5 February 1954) is a German former long-distance runner who competed for West Germany. He made thirteen consecutive appearances at the IAAF World Cross Country Championships from 1975 to 1987. His highest honour was a silver medal in 1980. He was a seven-time national champion, taking three titles in cross country running, two in road running and two in track.

His silver medal at the 1980 IAAF World Cross Country Championships made him only the second German to win an individual medal at the competition, after 1977 bronze medallist Detlef Uhlemann. Orthmann's finish remains the best ever by a German athlete. Orthmann was consistently among the best performing West German men at the competition in the 1970s and 1980s, scoring points for team alongside others including Michael Karst, Christoph Herle, Michael Scheytt and Ralf Salzmann. Their best finishes in the team competition were fourth place, achieved in 1977 and 1979.

He won his first international medal as a teenager, taking the 3000 metres gold at the 1973 European Athletics Junior Championships. He represented West Germany as a senior in that event four times at the European Athletics Indoor Championships, including a bronze medal at the 1980 edition.

Among his performances on the professional circuit were a win at the Hyogo Relays in 1982 and a runner-up finish at the 1977 Paderborner Osterlauf.

== Personal bests ==
- 3000 metres – 7:48.09 min (1976)
- 5000 metres – 13:30.53 min (1982)
- 10,000 metres – 28:02.92 min (1985)

All info from All-Athletics

== International competitions ==
| Year | Competition | Venue | Position | Event | Notes |
|---|---|---|---|---|---|
| 1973 | European Junior Championships | Duisburg, West Germany | 1st | 3000 m | 8:03.4 |
| 1975 | World Cross Country Championships | Rabat, Morocco | 9th | Senior race | 35:55 |
| 1975 | World Cross Country Championships | Rabat, Morocco | 9th | Senior team | 310 pts |
| 1976 | World Cross Country Championships | Chepstow, United Kingdom | 22nd | Senior race | 35:52 |
| 1976 | World Cross Country Championships | Chepstow, United Kingdom | 7th | Senior team | 292 pts |
| 1976 | European Indoor Championships | Munich, West Germany | 8th | 3000 m | 8:10.4 |
| 1977 | World Cross Country Championships | Düsseldorf, West Germany | 12th | Senior race | 38:20 |
| 1977 | World Cross Country Championships | Düsseldorf, West Germany | 4th | Senior team | 226 pts |
| 1978 | World Cross Country Championships | Glasgow, United Kingdom | 39th | Senior race | 41:08 |
| 1978 | World Cross Country Championships | Glasgow, United Kingdom | 7th | Senior team | 240 pts |
| 1979 | World Cross Country Championships | Limerick, Ireland | 24th | Senior race | 38:30 |
| 1979 | World Cross Country Championships | Limerick, Ireland | 4th | Senior team | 211 pts |
| 1980 | World Cross Country Championships | Paris, France | 2nd | Senior race | 37:02 |
| 1980 | World Cross Country Championships | Paris, France | 10th | Senior team | 343 pts |
| 1980 | European Indoor Championships | Sindelfingen, West Germany | 3rd | 3000 m | 7:59.9a |
| 1981 | World Cross Country Championships | Madrid, Spain | 28th | Senior race | 35:50 |
| 1981 | World Cross Country Championships | Madrid, Spain | 11th | Senior team | 475 pts |
| 1982 | World Cross Country Championships | Rome, Italy | 29th | Senior race | 34:50.4 |
| 1982 | World Cross Country Championships | Rome, Italy | 8th | Senior team | 330 pts |
| 1982 | European Indoor Championships | Milan, Italy | 7th | 3000 m | 8:00.53 |
| 1983 | World Cross Country Championships | Gateshead, United Kingdom | 18th | Senior race | 37:35 |
| 1983 | World Cross Country Championships | Gateshead, United Kingdom | 9th | Senior team | 322 pts |
| 1983 | European Indoor Championships | Budapest, Hungary | 9th | 3000 m | 8:01.83 |
| 1984 | World Cross Country Championships | East Rutherford, United States | 45th | Senior race | 34:34 |
| 1984 | World Cross Country Championships | East Rutherford, United States | 11th | Senior team | 402 pts |
| 1985 | World Cross Country Championships | Lisbon, Portugal | 57th | Senior race | 34:54 |
| 1985 | World Cross Country Championships | Lisbon, Portugal | 11th | Senior team | 441 pts |
| 1986 | World Cross Country Championships | Colombier, Switzerland | 117th | Senior race | 38:23 |
| 1986 | World Cross Country Championships | Colombier, Switzerland | 22nd | Senior team | 832 pts |
| 1987 | World Cross Country Championships | Warsaw, Poland | 101st | Senior race | 38:39 |
| 1987 | World Cross Country Championships | Warsaw, Poland | 13th | Senior team | 588 pts |

== National titles ==
- West German Athletics Championships
  - 5000 metres: 1974
  - 10,000 metres: 1982
- West German Road Championships
  - 25 kilometres: 1979, 1980
- West German Cross Country Championships
  - Long course: 1983, 1984
  - Short course: 1980

== See also ==
- List of 5000 metres national champions (men)
