= Juoksija =

Finnish sports magazine

- Former editors: Tapio Pekola; Ari Paunonen
- Categories: Sports magazine
- Frequency: 10 times per year
- Founder: Tapio Pekola; Heikki Pekola
- Founded: 1971
- First issue: October 1971
- Country: Finland
- Based in: Helsinki
- Language: Finnish
- Website: Juoksija

Juoksija (Finnish: Runner) is a Finnish language sports magazine which focuses on endurance sports, fitness, healthy living and running. Founded in 1971, the magazine is one of the earliest publications in this category in Europe.

== History and profile ==
Juoksija was launched in 1971, and the first issue appeared on October that year. The founders are Finnish brothers Tapio and Heikki Pekola. The magazine is published ten times per year.

Tapio Pekola served as the editor-in-chief of Juoksija until 1998 who remained in the editorial board of the magazine until 2008. Another editor-in-chief was Ari Paunonen.

Juoksija sold 20,537 copies and had 72,000 readers in 2017.
