= Ari Paunonen =

Finnish runner (born 1958)

Ari Paunonen (born 10 March 1958) is a Finnish male former middle- and long-distance runner who competed over distances from 800 metres up to 10,000 metres. His best international performances at a major event were bronze at the 1977 European Cup and fifth at the 1983 European Athletics Indoor Championships. He was also the 1500 m silver medallist at the Nordic Indoor Athletics Championships in 1986.

His personal best time of 3:55.65 minutes for the mile run is a Finnish record. He also set a European under-20 record of 7:43.20 minutes for the 3000 metres in 1977. As a junior athlete he won back-to-back 1500 m titles at the European Athletics Junior Championships in 1975 and 1977, as well as a junior race bronze at the 1977 IAAF World Cross Country Championships. At national level he won a middle-distance double at the Finnish Athletics Championships in 1977, won a second 1500 m title in 1979 and took three short course cross country titles between 1977 and 1980. He was also a four-time national indoor champion.

Born in Sulkava, he later became editor of Juoksija, a Finnish sports and fitness magazine. He married Alia Virkberg, also a former distance runner.

== International competitions ==
Year	Competition	Venue	Position	Event	Notes
1975	European Junior Championships	Athens, Greece	1st	1500 m	3:44.8
1977	World Cross Country Championships	Düsseldorf, West Germany	3rd	Junior race	23:39
1977	World Cross Country Championships	Düsseldorf, West Germany	6th	Junior team	98 pts
1977	European Junior Championships	Donetsk, Soviet Union	1st	1500 m	3:41.6
1977	European Cup	Helsinki, Finland	3rd	1500 m	3:45.90
1978	European Championships	Prague, Czechoslovakia	9th (h)	1500 m	3:45.0
1980	World Cross Country Championships	Paris, France	136th	Senior race	40:15
1983	European Indoor Championships	Budapest, Hungary	5th	3000 m	7:59.53
1985	World Cross Country Championships	Lisbon, Portugal	66th	Senior race	35:00
1985	World Cross Country Championships	Lisbon, Portugal	9th	Team	439 pts
1986	European Indoor Championships	Madrid, Spain	14th (h)	1500 m	3:50.07
1986	Nordic Indoor Championships	Lidingö, Sweden	2nd	1500 m	3:46.07
1988	World Cross Country Championships	Auckland, New Zealand	144th	Senior race	38:40

== National titles ==
- Finnish Athletics Championships
  - 800 metres: 1977
  - 1500 metres: 1977, 1979
  - Cross country short course: 1977, 1979, 1980
- Finnish Indoor Athletics Championships
  - 1500 m: 1981
  - 3000 m: 1978, 1983
  - 5000 m: 1987

== Personal bests ==
- 800 metres – 1:47.74 (1977)
- 1500 metres – 3:38.07 (1977)
- Mile run – 3:55.65 (1977)
- 3000 metres – 7:43.2 (1977)
- 5000 metres – 13:31.56 (1987)
- 10,000 metres – 28:25.16 (1987)
