= William Vanhuylenbroek =

Belgian long-distance runner

William ("Willy") Vanhuylenbroek (born 21 June 1956) is a long-distance runner from Belgium, who won the 1986 edition of Amsterdam Marathon, clocking 2:14:46 on 11 May 1986. He had finished second the year before. He finished in 16th place at the 1990 European Championships in Split. He represented his national team at the 1981, 1986, 1987 and 1989 IAAF World Cross Country Championships.

== Achievements ==
Year	Competition	Venue	Position	Event	Notes
Representing Belgium
1986	Amsterdam Marathon	Amsterdam, Netherlands	1st	Marathon	2:14:46
1990	European Championships	Split, FR Yugoslavia	16th	Marathon	2:24:23
