= Nicolas Nyengerai =

Zimbabwean long-distance runner

Nicolas Nyengerai (born 1961) is a Zimbabwean long-distance runner who specialized in the marathon.

He participated at the 1987 and 1995 World Cross Country Championships. His marathon wins came at the 1992 Belgrade Marathon, the 1995 Zwolle Marathon and the 1995 All-Africa Games.

His personal best time was 2:15:38 hours, achieved in November 1998 at Zanzibar.
