= David Carr (athlete) =

Australian athlete (1932–2023)

David Carr (15 June 1932 – 18 July 2023) was an Australian masters track and field athlete, known for running middle distance races. He is the current world record holder in the M75 800 metres, the M80 Mile, 2000 metres steeplechase and as a member of the 4 × 400 metres relay team.

== Athletic achievements ==
In the World Masters Athletics Championships, in the 800 metres, Carr has won the gold medal in 1999, 2001, 2003, 2007, 2011, 2013 and 2015. He took silver behind Janusz Kociszewski in 2008 and 2005, with silvers also in 1987 and 1993. He was bronze medalist behind Earl Fee in 1997. He won the 1500 metres in 1997, 2007, 2013 and 2015, with a silver in 2003 and bronze in 2011. He also won the steeplechase in 2011, 2013 and 2015 after taking silver in 2009. In the 400 metres he won the world title in 2009, 2013 and 2015 along with a bronze in 1993.

In 2008 and 2009 he was awarded the Brian Foley award by Australian Masters Athletics for the best age-graded 800 metre/1500 metre performances in those years.

Carr came in second in worldwide voting for the best masters athlete of 2015.

Carr was involved in the sport from 1948, with time out for service in the Navy and as a teacher. He began running in the Masters division in 1974 and went to his first World Championship in 1980. In local meets he has tried most events in the sport.

== Personal life and death ==
Carr was born on 15 June 1932 in Harvey, Western Australia. In 1958, he married his wife Patricia, with whom he had three children. He died on 18 July 2023, at the age of 91 from metastatic melanoma.
