= Flemming Jensen (fl. 1980s) =

Danish lightweight rower (born 1914)

Sport
- Sport: Rowing
Medal record
Men's rowing
Representing Denmark
World Rowing Championships
| Gold medal – first place | 1984 Montreal | Lwt eight |
| Bronze medal – third place | 1982 Lucerne | Lwt four |
| Bronze medal – third place | 1983 Duisburg | Lwt eight |
| Bronze medal – third place | 1986 Nottingham | Lwt eight |

Flemming Jensen is a Danish lightweight rower.

At the 1982 World Rowing Championships in Lucerne, he won a bronze medal with the lightweight men's four. At the 1983 World Rowing Championships in Duisburg, he started with the lightweight men's eight and came third. He won a gold medal at the 1984 World Rowing Championships in Montreal with the lightweight men's eight. At the 1986 World Rowing Championships in Nottingham, he won another bronze medal with the lightweight men's eight. At the 1987 World Rowing Championships in Copenhagen, he came fifth with the lightweight men's four.
