= Cor Lambregts =

Dutch long-distance runner

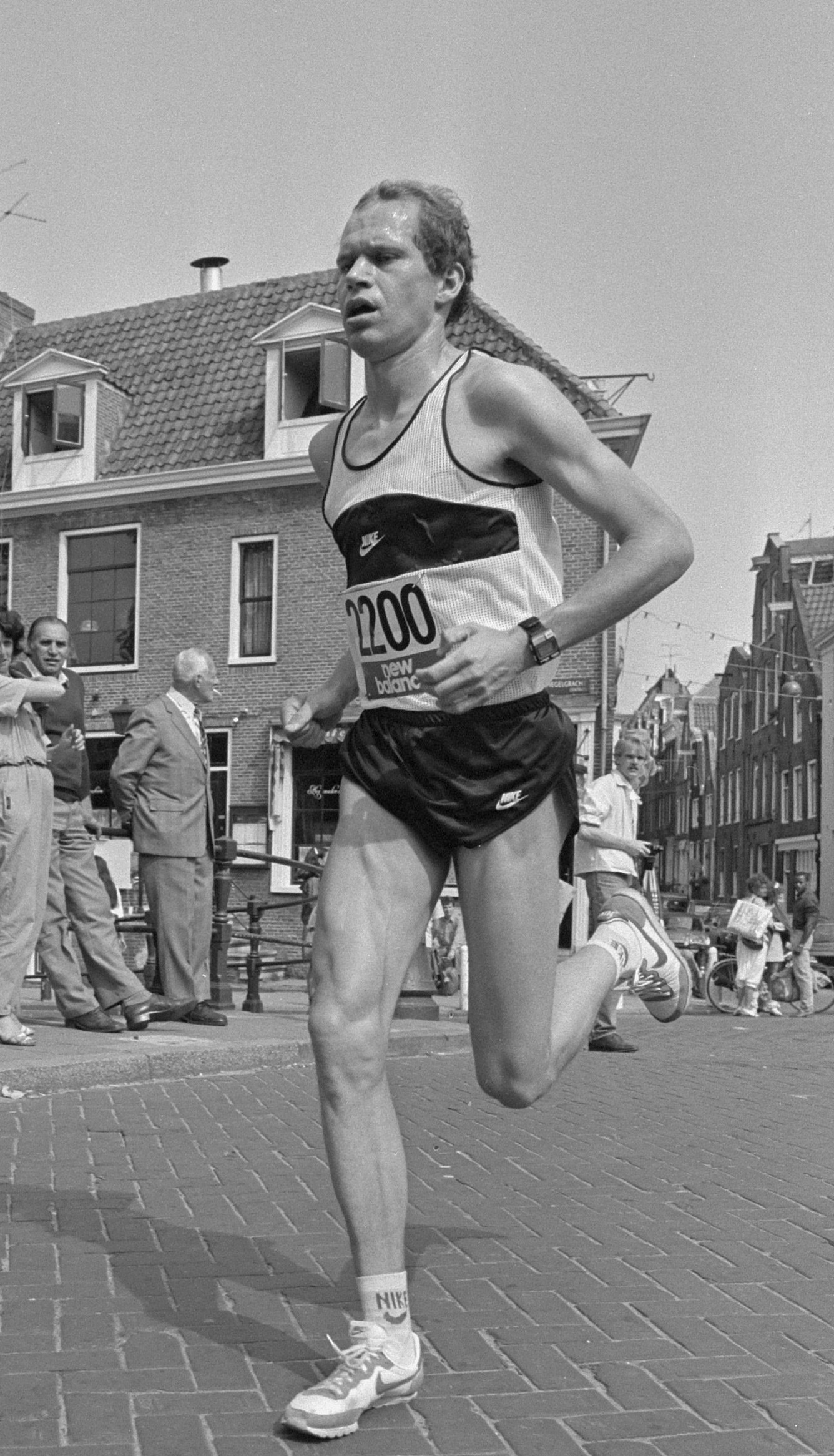
- Cor Lambregts in 1984

Personal information
- Born: 22 April 1958 (age 68) Roermond, the Netherlands
- Height: 1.78 m (5 ft 10 in)
- Weight: 66 kg (146 lb)

Sport
- Sport: Long-distance running
- Club: Unitas, Sittard

Cornelis Johannes Maria "Cor" Lambregts (born 22 April 1958) is a retired Dutch long-distance runner. He competed in the marathon at the 1984 Summer Olympics, but failed to finish.
