= João Carvalho (runner) =

Angolan long-distance runner

Personal information
- Nationality: Angolan
- Born: 4 November 1950 (age 74)

Sport
- Sport: Long-distance running
- Event: Marathon

João Carvalho (born 4 November 1950) is an Angolan long-distance runner. He competed in the men's marathon at the 1988 Summer Olympics. He also served as the coach of Angolan Olympian João N'Tyamba.
