= Brad Camp =

Australian long-distance runner

Brad Camp (born 25 December 1964) is an Australian former long-distance runner who competed in the 1988 Summer Olympics.
