= Vadim Sidorov =

Personal information
- Born: April 11, 1959 (age 67)

Sport
- Sport: Marathon running

Vadim Sidorov (born April 11, 1959) is a retired male long-distance runner from Russia. He outfinished Britain's Hugh Jones in the final 600 meters to win the 1982 Tokyo International Marathon.

== Achievements ==
Year	Competition	Venue	Position	Event	Notes
Representing Soviet Union
1981	IAAF World Cross Country Championships	Madrid, Spain	78th	Cross	
1982	Tokyo International Marathon	Tokyo, Japan	1st	Marathon	2:10:33
1982	European Championships	Athens, Greece	24th	Marathon	2:31:29
