= 1976 NCAA Division I cross country championships =

1976 cross-country running meet of the NCAA (Division I)

1976 NCAA Division I Men's Cross Country Championships
- Organisers: NCAA
- Edition: 38th
- Date: November 22, 1976
- Host city: Denton, TX; North Texas State University
- Venue: NTSU Cross Country Course
- Distances: 10 km (6.21 mi)
- Participation: 298 athletes

The 1976 NCAA Division I Men's Cross Country Championships were the 38th annual cross country meet to determine the team and individual national champions of NCAA Division I men's collegiate cross country running in the United States. Held on November 22, 1976, the meet was hosted by North Texas State University at the NTSU Cross Country Course in Denton, Texas. The distance for this race was 10 kilometers (6.21 miles).

All Division I members were eligible to qualify for the meet. In total, 34 teams and 298 individual runners contested this championship.

The team national championship was retained by the UTEP Miners, their third title. The individual championship was won by Henry Rono, from Washington State, with a meet distance record time of 28:06.60. As of the 2016 championships, Rono's record time has yet to be surpassed during a national NCAA meet despite being recorded during the first ever NCAA championship at the 10 kilometer distance.

== Men's title ==
- Distance: 10,000 meters (6.21 miles)

=== Team Result (Top 10) ===
Rank	Team	Points
1st place, gold medalist(s)	UTEP	62
2nd place, silver medalist(s)	Oregon	117
3rd place, bronze medalist(s)	Washington State	179
4	BYU	182
5	Illinois	227
6	Tennessee	280
7	Arizona	324
8	San Diego State	361
9	Providence	370
10	Arkansas	373

=== Individual Result (Top 10) ===
Rank	Name	Nationality	Time
1st place, gold medalist(s)	(Kenya) Henry Rono	Washington State	28:06.60
2nd place, silver medalist(s)	(Kenya) Samson Kimobwa	Washington State	28:16.78
3rd place, bronze medalist(s)	Craig Virgin	Illinois	28:26.53
4	Herb Lindsay	Michigan State	28:30.69
5	(Republic of Ireland) John Treacy	Providence	28:34.84
6	(Kenya) Wilson Waigwa	UTEP	28:39.00
7	(Republic of Ireland) Niall O'Shaughnessy	Arkansas	28:43.16
8	Sammy Maritim	UTEP	28:46.37
9	Rudy Chapa	Oregon	28:49.58
10	(Kenya) James Munyala	UTEP	28:52.79

== See also ==
- NCAA Men's Division II Cross Country Championship
- NCAA Men's Division III Cross Country Championship
