= Mauro Pappacena =

Italian long-distance runner

Personal information
- Nationality: Italian
- Born: 18 August 1958 (age 67)

Sport
- Country: Italy
- Sport: Athletics
- Event(s): Long-distance running Marathon

Achievements and titles
- Personal best: Marathon: 2:22:45 (1984)

Mauro Pappacena (born 18 August 1958) is a former Italian male long-distance runner who competed at three editions of the IAAF World Cross Country Championships at senior level (1976, 1977, 1979).
