= Arturo Iacona =

Italian long-distance runner

Personal information
- Nationality: Italian
- Born: 25 November 1957 (age 68)

Sport
- Country: Italy
- Sport: Athletics
- Event: Long-distance running
- Club: ASSI Giglio Rosso

Achievements and titles
- Personal best: Marathon: 2:15:15 (1983)

Arturo Iacona (born 25 November 1957) is a former Italian male long-distance runner who competed at three edition of the IAAF World Cross Country Championships at senior level (1977, 1978, 1981),
