= Thom Hunt =

American athletics competitor

Personal information
- Nationality: American
- Born: March 17, 1958 (age 68) Coronado, California

Sport
- Sport: Cross country, track
- Events: 1500 meters, mile, 5000 meters, 10,000 meters, marathon
- College team: Arizona

Achievements and titles
- Personal bests: 1500m: 3:42.07; Indoor mile: 3:57.88; 3000m: 7:48.58; 5000m: 13:26.34; 10,000m: 27:59.1; Marathon: 2:12:14
Medal record
Men's athletics
Representing United States
IAAF World Cross Country Championships
Silver medal – second place	1976 Chepstow	Junior men's 7.8K
Gold medal – first place	1977 Düsseldorf	Junior men's 7.5K
Silver medal – second place	1981 Madrid	Team Long Race
Silver medal – second place	1983 Gateshead	Team Long Race

Thom Hunt (born March 17, 1958) is a retired distance runner who specialized in various events from the 1500 meters to the marathon. He represented the United States in international competition and was particularly prolific in cross country running. He was the junior runner-up at the IAAF World Cross Country Championships in 1976 and won in 1977. He currently coaches Women's Cross Country at Cuyamaca College.

== Running career ==
=== High school ===
Hunt attended Patrick Henry High School of San Diego, California, where he ran cross country and track. He set the high school indoor mile record at 4:02, which lasted until Alan Webb broke it in 2001. Overall, he set multiple high school records for the state of California, and recorded a personal best of 8:45.2 in the 2-mile by the time he graduated.

=== Collegiate ===
Hunt attended and ran with University of Arizona. During his time in college, he would earn four All-America honors in cross country, and three in track and field. He also set school records in the 3000 meter steeplechase and 5000 meters.

=== Post-collegiate ===
Hunt finished in first place among men at the 1986 Cherry Blossom Ten Mile Run in a time of 46:15. On May 4, 1986, Hunt ran his personal best time of 2:12:14 at the New Jersey Waterfront Marathon, finishing in second behind Bill Donakowski. On September 23, 1990, Hunt won the 48th Aztec Cross-Country Invitational as an unattached runner, running the 8-kilometer course in 24:13.98 at the age of 32.
