= Marty Froelick =

American marathon runner

Marty Froelick (born March 12, 1958) is an American runner. In 1987, he won the Twin Cities Marathon, one of the largest races in the nation at the time. He finished with a time of 2:10:59, which remained his career-best marathon time.

== Running career ==
Froelick graduated Scarborough High School in Houston, Texas, before enrolling at Rice University, also in Houston.

At Rice, he ran track in the late 1970s and early 1980s. His teammate Jeff Wells, an Olympic Trials-qualifying runner, was able to challenge him in workouts. Froelick suffered through some injuries during two of the years. But he reemerged in 1981 to become the 10,000 meters Southwest Conference champion. His best college time for the 10,000 was 29:14.9, which remains the second-best time ever run by a Rice University student.

In 1983, he was fronting several races, and ran a personal best in the 10,000 meters: 28:53.7. The same year, he ran his first marathon in Houston. He finished third, clocking a time of 2:12:47. Nine months later, he ran the New York City Marathon, finishing 26th in a time of 2:15:12.

Froelick ran several other road and track races, including the Beijing Marathon, and then returned to his hometown for the Houston Marathon in 1985. He beat the other professional runners in the fast-growing metro marathon, and he took home the first-place medal and $20,000 prize purse.

In 1986, he also ran multiple races and sought to defend his marathon win. He led the pack of runners through streets filled with spectators, but at the end, came in second to Paul Cummings.

Froelick ran the Twin Cities Marathon in October 1986 and finished fifth. He returned to Minnesota again in September 1987 to run the City of Lakes 25K. He swept the field, finishing first in a course-record 1:04:31.

A month later, October 11, 1987, Froelick toed the line at the Twin Cities Marathon a second time. Many of the 6,488 registrants were wearing long-sleeve shirts and sweatpants, but Froelick wore his shorts and a red singlet. The low temperature for the day was the coldest of any Twin Cities marathon mornings—23 degrees F. As the temperature warmed, Froelick led the pack. At the 15-mile mark only two others remained with him: Paul Gompers and Mark Curp. But Froelick pulled away with five miles to go, and put 40 seconds between him and Gompers, who would finish second. Froelick snapped the tape in 2:10:59, taking first place and netting $25,000 in prize money. His time stood as the fastest marathon in the United States in 1987.
