= Santiago Llorente =

Spanish athlete (1958–2020)

Santiago Llorente Fernández (Segovia, 9 July 1958 – 27 March 2020) was a Spanish athlete.

== Career ==
At the end of the 1970s, when Llorente was 16 years old, he was world runner-up in cross-country running, in Luxembourg, in 1975, which gave a boost to his sports career. In 1977, he became world runner-up in cross country running, in the junior category. That same year he was national champion in the 3,000 meters indoor junior category.

With the Gipuzkoan federation, in 1984, he was the cross-country champion in the Basque country and broke the Basque record of 5,000 meters with a time of 13.52,27 minutes, which he maintained after a quarter of a century. He completed a great mark of 29.17,4 in 10,000 meters that same year. Later he won at the Cross de Venta de Baños, in 1985. In 1986, representing the Madrid federation, he won the absolute championship of Spain in the 10,000 meters category.

In 1987 he set two personal records representing the Segovia federation, registering 13.42,3 minutes in 5,000 meters and 28.38,80 in 10,000 meters. However, a sciatica injury stopped his progression, forcing him to retire from his career as an athlete.

He remained within the world of sports as masseur for various athletes such as the Olympic medalist Francis Obikwelu and the cyclists Óscar Pereiro and Carlos Sastre.

== Personal life ==
In 1995 he had a son, Santiago Llorente Mangas, born in Segovia; he also became an athlete.

== Death ==
Llorente died in his native Segovia on 27 March 2020, at the age of 62, of COVID-19 during the pandemic in Spain. His death was announced on social networks by the president of the Spanish Athletics Federation, Raúl Chapado.
