= Nat Muir =

Scottish long-distance runner (born 1958)

Nathaniel "Nat" Muir (born 12 March 1958) from Salsburgh, North Lanarkshire is a Scottish retired long-distance runner. He competed at the IAAF World Cross Country Championships on ten occasions, four times as a junior from 1974 to 1977 and six times as a senior between 1978 and 1987.

Muir took up athletics in 1970 while at primary school in Chapelhall. He was encouraged by his fellow pupils to join the Shettleston Harriers running club, and his first race was the Lanarkshire Relays in 1970, which saw him earn the fastest individual time in his age group.

His career has seen some ups and downs and he has been described as "One of Scotland's best ever distance runners: possibly also one of the country's unluckiest in that he never had the success at the very topmost level that his ability and dedication deserved".

Muir ran in many competitions throughout his career from his humble beginnings in 1970 spanning over twenty years, with some notable successes such as his fifth win at the 1984 Irvine Beach Park. His last race was in the 1992-93 season on the Glasgow-Edinburgh run where his team came in 7th with Muir's recurring Achilles tendon injury.

Muir himself knew that with the injury his time had come to retire, a decision not brought on by team performance but by his knowledge of his personal limitations to his own fitness and a previous race, the Allan Scally Relay, as a gauge for the upcoming Glasgow-Edinburgh run. He reflected that "athletics is essentially an individual sport with a team element coming second to that. No one can gainsay that".
