= 1975 IAAF World Cross Country Championships – Senior men's race =

Senior men's race at the 1975 IAAF World Cross Country Championships
- Organisers: IAAF
- Edition: 3rd
- Date: 16 March
- Host city: Rabat, Morocco
- Venue: Souissi Racecourse
- Events: 1
- Distances: 12 km – Senior men
- Participation: 185 athletes from 25 nations

The Senior men's race at the 1975 IAAF World Cross Country Championships was held in Rabat, Morocco, at the Souissi Racecourse on 16 March 1975. A report on the event was given in the Glasgow Herald.

Complete results, medallists, and the results of British athletes were published.

== Race results ==
=== Senior men's race (12 km) ===
==== Individual ====
| Rank | Athlete | Country | Time |
|---|---|---|---|
| 1st place, gold medalist(s) | Ian Stewart | Scotland | 35:20 |
| 2nd place, silver medalist(s) | Mariano Haro | Spain | 35:21 |
| 3rd place, bronze medalist(s) | Bill Rodgers | United States | 35:27.4 |
| 4 | John Walker | New Zealand | 35:45 |
| 5 | Euan Robertson | New Zealand | 35:46 |
| 6 | Franco Fava | Italy | 35:47 |
| 7 | Ray Smedley | England | 35:50 |
| 8 | Klaus-Peter Hildenbrand | West Germany | 35:51 |
| 9 | Hans-Jürgen Orthmann | West Germany | 35:55 |
| 10 | Gaston Roelants | Belgium | 35:57 |
| 11 | Wilfried Scholz | East Germany | 35:58 |
| 12 | Abdelkader Zaddem | Tunisia | 36:00 |
| 13 | Luigi Zarcone | Italy | 36:02 |
| 14 | Grenville Tuck | England | 36:10 |
| 15 | Waldemar Cierpinski | East Germany | 36:16 |
| 16 | Emiel Puttemans | Belgium | 36:17 |
| 17 | Seppo Tuominen | Finland | 36:19 |
| 18 | Haddou Jaddour | Morocco | 36:21 |
| 19 | Noel Tijou | France | 36:24 |
| 20 | Frank Shorter | United States | 36:25 |
| 21 | André Ornelis | Belgium | 36:26 |
| 22 | Bill Scott | Australia | 36:28 |
| 23 | Michael Karst | West Germany | |
| 24 | Tapio Kantanen | Finland | |
| 25 | David Sirl | New Zealand | |
| 26 | John Dixon | New Zealand | |
| 27 | Joachim Krebs | East Germany | |
| 28 | Kamel Guemar | Algeria | |
| 29 | Scott Bringhurst | United States | |
| 30 | Gary Tuttle | United States | |
| 31 | Lucien Rault | France | |
| 32 | Pierre Liardet | France | |
| 33 | John Sheddan | New Zealand | |
| 34 | Bryan Rose | New Zealand | |
| 35 | Bernie Plain | Wales | |
| 36 | Jack Foster | New Zealand | |
| 37 | Bernie Ford | England | |
| 38 | Allister Hutton | Scotland | |
| 39 | Tony Simmons | England | |
| 40 | Gerald Umbach | East Germany | |
| 41 | Rabah Zaidi | Tunisia | |
| 42 | Santiago de la Parte | Spain | |
| 43 | Laurence Reilly | Scotland | |
| 44 | Dic Evans | Wales | |
| 45 | Eddy Rombaux | Belgium | |
| 46 | Djelloul Rezique | Algeria | |
| 47 | Chris Wardlaw | Australia | 37:01 |
| 48 | Robert McDonald | Australia | 37:02 |
| 49 | Smain Yahiaoui | Algeria | |
| 50 | Trevor Wright | England | |
| 51 | Alan Blinston | England | |
| 52 | Neil Cusack | Ireland | |
| 53 | Andrew McKean | Scotland | |
| 54 | Abdelmadjid Mada | Algeria | |
| 55 | Boualem Rahoui | Algeria | |
| 56 | Aarno Ristimäki | Finland | |
| 57 | Marc Smet | Belgium | |
| 58 | Seppo Nikkari | Finland | |
| 59 | Aldo Tomasini | Italy | |
| 60 | James Langford | Australia | |
| 61 | Fernando Cerrada | Spain | |
| 62 | Erik Gijselinck | Belgium | |
| 63 | Anton Gorbunow | West Germany | |
| 64 | Jean-Paul Gomez | France | |
| 65 | Giuseppe Cindolo | Italy | |
| 66 | Frank Baumgartl | East Germany | |
| 67 | Eddie Leddy | Ireland | |
| 68 | Shag Musa Medani | Sudan | |
| 69 | Mohamed Kacemi | Algeria | |
| 70 | Jeff Galloway | United States | |
| 71 | Mike Beevor | England | |
| 72 | Kevin Ryan | New Zealand | |
| 73 | Cherif Ben Ali | Algeria | |
| 74 | Albien Van Holsbeek | Belgium | |
| 75 | Jim Brown | Scotland | |
| 76 | Jean-Yves Le Flohic | France | |
| 77 | Hussein Soltani | Tunisia | |
| 78 | Mohamed Ghannouchi | Morocco | |
| 79 | Tahar Bounab | Algeria | |
| 80 | John McLaughlin | Northern Ireland | |
| 81 | Christian Cairoche | France | |
| 82 | Rees Ward | Scotland | |
| 83 | Juan Hidalgo | Spain | |
| 84 | Jean Levaillant | France | |
| 85 | Rachid Habchaoui | Algeria | |
| 86 | Adelaziz Bouguerra | Tunisia | |
| 87 | Clive Thomas | Wales | |
| 88 | Dahou Belghazi | Morocco | |
| 89 | Keith Angus | England | |
| 90 | Venanzio Ortis | Italy | |
| 91 | Paul Lawther | Northern Ireland | |
| 92 | Gino Trambaiolo | Italy | |
| 93 | José Haro | Spain | |
| 94 | Abdellah Jaouhari | Egypt | |
| 95 | Omar Slassi | Morocco | |
| 96 | Steve Gibbons | Wales | |
| 97 | Lahcen El Hachmi | Morocco | |
| 98 | Jack Bacheler | United States | |
| 99 | Ricardo Ortega | Spain | |
| 100 | Donal Walsh | Ireland | |
| 101 | Jim Alder | Scotland | |
| 102 | John Roscoe | United States | |
| 103 | Friedel Klement | West Germany | |
| 104 | Reinhard Leibold | West Germany | |
| 105 | David Chettle | Australia | 38:17 |
| 106 | Thomas Brennan | Ireland | |
| 107 | Mohamed Khalifi | Morocco | |
| 108 | Jean-Pierre Eudier | France | |
| 109 | Mhedheb Hannachi | Tunisia | |
| 110 | Ian Gilmour | Scotland | |
| 111 | Frank Clement | Scotland | |
| 112 | Mohamed Mechouat | Morocco | |
| 113 | Dick Quax | New Zealand | |
| 114 | Desmond McGann | Ireland | |
| 115 | Manfred Kuschmann | East Germany | |
| 116 | Risto Ala-Korpi | Finland | |
| 117 | Mohamed Benbaraka | Morocco | |
| 118 | Stefano Grazzini | Italy | |
| 119 | John Amo Jok | Sudan | |
| 120 | Mike Teer | Northern Ireland | |
| 121 | Omer Khalifa | Sudan | |
| 122 | Mohamed Sharif Samavel | Iran | |
| 123 | David Hopkins | Wales | |
| 124 | Tom Price | Northern Ireland | |
| 125 | Mohamed Shoushane | Libya | |
| 126 | Dennis Nee | Australia | 39:09 |
| 127 | Hossein Rabbi | Iran | |
| 128 | Peter Griffiths | Wales | |
| 129 | Cherif Hannchi | Tunisia | |
| 130 | Gerry Hannon | Northern Ireland | |
| 131 | Mohamed Zaidi | Tunisia | |
| 132 | Idari Osa Ayab | Sudan | |
| 133 | Labidi Ayachi | Tunisia | |
| 134 | Paul Thijs | Belgium | |
| 135 | Mario Vaiani-Lisi | Italy | |
| 136 | Tony Brien | Ireland | |
| 137 | Jim McGuinness | Northern Ireland | |
| 138 | Issa Samir Moustapha | Syria | |
| 139 | Ghulam Reza Saher | Iran | |
| 140 | Robert Talay | Australia | 40:06 |
| 141 | Mohamed Masomi | Iran | |
| 142 | David Jones | Wales | |
| 143 | Hamou Abdellah Publa | Syria | |
| 144 | Jean-Marie Conrath | France | |
| 145 | Taher Musa Abeih | Libya | |
| 146 | Dafallah Sultan Farah | Sudan | |
| 147 | Kidam Khamis Omda | Sudan | |
| 148 | Moharrom Yaftian | Iran | |
| 149 | Abdulkarim Joumaa | Syria | |
| 150 | Mohamed Adam Taibay | Sudan | |
| 151 | Chebaan Hsain | Syria | |
| 152 | Abdellah Sugi | Libya | |
| 153 | Ali Abdoc | Iran | |
| 154 | Ahmed Amir Khan | Iran | |
| 155 | John Charvetto | Gibraltar | |
| 156 | Abdellah Ashimi | Libya | |
| 157 | Salem Muri | Libya | |
| 158 | Salah Mounfil | Syria | |
| 159 | Hadj Hassan Faouz | Syria | |
| 160 | Said Abouharamas | Libya | |
| 161 | Sergio Alecio | Gibraltar | |
| 162 | Shabant Abdussalam | Libya | |
| 163 | James Hayts | Northern Ireland | |
| 164 | Malcolm Blagg | Gibraltar | |
| 165 | Aurelio Falero | Gibraltar | |
| 166 | Shukair Al-Shaibani | Saudi Arabia | |
| 167 | Raga Al-Shalawi | Saudi Arabia | |
| 168 | Fahed Aboullif | Saudi Arabia | |
| 169 | Hizam Fenis | Saudi Arabia | |
| 170 | Shetoui Aouadh Al-Bishi | Saudi Arabia | |
| 171 | Fahed El Kasmi | Saudi Arabia | |
| 172 | William Vassallo | Gibraltar | |
| 173 | Bob Robert | Gibraltar | |
| — | Antonio Campos | Spain | DNF |
| — | Gerd Frähmcke | West Germany | DNF |
| — | Tom O'Riordan | Ireland | DNF |
| — | Pekka Päivärinta | Finland | DNF |
| — | José Luis Ruiz | Spain | DNF |
| — | Fernando Fernandez | Spain | DNF |
| — | Luigi Lauro | Italy | DNF |
| — | Eddy Van Mullem | Belgium | DNF |
| — | John Axsentieff | Australia | DNF |
| — | Hamida Gamoudi | Tunisia | DNF |
| — | Barry Brown | United States | DNF |
| — | Rune Holmén | Finland | DNF |

==== Teams ====
| Rank | Team | Points |
|---|---|---|
| 1st place, gold medalist(s) | New Zealand: John Walker / 4; Euan Robertson / 5; David Sirl / 25; John Dixon / 26; John Sheddan / 33; Bryan Rose / 34; (Jack Foster) / (36); (Kevin Ryan) / (72); (Dick Quax) / (113) | 127 |
| 2nd place, silver medalist(s) | England: Ray Smedley / 7; Grenville Tuck / 14; Bernie Ford / 37; Tony Simmons / 39; Trevor Wright / 50; Alan Blinston / 51; (Mike Beevor) / (71); (Keith Angus) / (89) | 198 |
| 3rd place, bronze medalist(s) | Belgium: Gaston Roelants / 10; Emiel Puttemans / 16; André Ornelis / 21; Eddy Rombaux / 45; Marc Smet / 57; Erik Gijselinck / 62; (Albien Van Holsbeek) / (74); (Paul Thijs) / (134); (Eddy Van Mullem) / (DNF) | 211 |
| 4 | United States: Bill Rodgers / 3; Frank Shorter / 20; Scott Bringhurst / 29; Gary Tuttle / 30; Jeff Galloway / 70; Jack Bacheler / 98; (John Roscoe) / (102); (Barry Brown) / (DNF) | 250 |
| 5 | East Germany: Wilfried Scholz / 11; Waldemar Cierpinski / 15; Joachim Krebs / 27; Gerald Umbach / 40; Frank Baumgartl / 66; Manfred Kuschmann / 115 | 274 |
| 6 | Scotland: Ian Stewart / 1; Allister Hutton / 38; Laurence Reilly / 43; Andrew McKean / 53; Jim Brown / 75; Rees Ward / 82; (Jim Alder) / (101); (Ian Gilmour) / (110); (Frank Clement) / (111) | 292 |
| 7 | Algeria: Kamel Guemar / 28; Djelloul Rezique / 46; Smain Yahiaoui / 49; Abdelmadjid Mada / 54; Boualem Rahoui / 55; Mohamed Kacemi / 69; (Cherif Ben Ali) / (73); (Tahar Bounab) / (79); (Rachid Habchaoui) / (85) | 301 |
| 8 | France: Noel Tijou / 19; Lucien Rault / 31; Pierre Liardet / 32; Jean-Paul Gomez / 64; Jean-Yves Le Flohic / 76; Christian Cairoche / 81; (Jean Levaillant) / (84); (Jean-Pierre Eudier) / (108); (Jean-Marie Conrath) / (144) | 303 |
| 9 | West Germany: Klaus-Peter Hildenbrand / 8; Hans-Jürgen Orthmann / 9; Michael Karst / 23; Anton Gorbunow / 63; Friedel Klement / 103; Reinhard Leibold / 104; (Gerd Frähmcke) / (DNF) | 310 |
| 10 | Italy: Franco Fava / 6; Luigi Zarcone / 13; Aldo Tomasini / 59; Giuseppe Cindolo / 65; Venanzio Ortis / 90; Gino Trambaiolo / 92; (Stefano Grazzini) / (118); (Mario Vaiani-Lisi) / (135); (Luigi Lauro) / (DNF) | 325 |
| 11 | Spain: Mariano Haro / 2; Santiago de la Parte / 42; Fernando Cerrada / 61; Juan Hidalgo / 83; José Haro / 93; Ricardo Ortega / 99; (Antonio Campos) / (DNF); (José Luis Ruiz) / (DNF); (Fernando Fernandez) / (DNF) | 380 |
| 12 | Australia: Bill Scott / 22; Chris Wardlaw / 47; Robert McDonald / 48; James Langford / 60; David Chettle / 105; Dennis Nee / 126; (Robert Talay) / (140); (John Axsentieff) / (DNF) | 408 |
| 13 | Tunisia: Abdelkader Zaddem / 12; Rabah Zaidi / 41; Hussein Soltani / 77; Adelaziz Bouguerra / 86; Mhedheb Hannachi / 109; Cherif Hannchi / 129; (Mohamed Zaidi) / (131); (Labidi Ayachi) / (133); (Hamida Gamoudi) / (DNF) | 454 |
| 14 | Morocco: Haddou Jaddour / 18; Mohamed Ghannouchi / 78; Dahou Belghazi / 88; Omar Slassi / 95; Lahcen El Hachmi / 97; Mohamed Khalifi / 107; (Mohamed Mechouat) / (112); (Mohamed Benbaraka) / (117) | 483 |
| 15 | Wales: Bernie Plain / 35; Dic Evans / 44; Clive Thomas / 87; Steve Gibbons / 96; David Hopkins / 123; Peter Griffiths / 128; (David Jones) / (142) | 513 |
| 16 | Ireland: Neil Cusack / 52; Eddie Leddy / 67; Donal Walsh / 100; Thomas Brennan / 106; Desmond McGann / 114; Tony Brien / 136; (Tom O'Riordan) / (DNF) | 575 |
| 17 | Northern Ireland: John McLaughlin / 80; Paul Lawther / 91; Mike Teer / 120; Tom Price / 124; Gerry Hannon / 130; Jim McGuinness / 137; (James Hayts) / (163) | 682 |
| 18 | Sudan: Shag Musa Medani / 68; John Amo Jok / 119; Omer Khalifa / 121; Idari Osa Ayab / 132; Dafallah Sultan Farah / 146; Kidam Khamis Omda / 147; (Mohamed Adam Taibay) / (150) | 733 |
| 19 | Iran: Mohamed Sharif Samavel / 122; Hossein Rabbi / 127; Ghulam Reza Saher / 139; Mohamed Masomi / 141; Moharrom Yaftian / 148; Ali Abdoc / 153; (Ahmed Amir Khan) / (154) | 830 |
| 20 | Libya: Mohamed Shoushane / 125; Taher Musa Abeih / 145; Abdellah Sugi / 152; Abdellah Ashimi / 156; Salem Muri / 157; Said Abouharamas / 160; (Shabant Abdussalam) / (162) | 895 |
| 21 | Syria: Issa Samir Moustapha / 138; Hamou Abdellah Publa / 143; Abdulkarim Joumaa / 149; Chebaan Hsain / 151; Salah Mounfil / 158; Hadj Hassan Faouz / 159 | 898 |
| 22 | Gibraltar: John Charvetto / 155; Sergio Alecio / 161; Malcolm Blagg / 164; Aurelio Falero / 165; William Vassallo / 172; Bob Robert / 173 | 990 |
| 23 | Saudi Arabia: Shukair Al-Shaibani / 166; Raga Al-Shalawi / 167; Fahed Aboullif / 168; Hizam Fenis / 169; Shetoui Aouadh Al-Bishi / 170; Fahed El Kasmi / 171 | 1011 |
| DNF | Finland: (Seppo Tuominen) / (17); (Tapio Kantanen) / (24); (Aarno Ristimäki) / (56); (Seppo Nikkari) / (58); (Risto Ala-Korpi) / (116); (Pekka Päivärinta) / (DNF); (Rune Holmén) / (DNF) | DNF |

- Note: Athletes in parentheses did not score for the team result

== Participation ==
An unofficial count yields the participation of 185 athletes from 25 countries in the Senior men's race. This is in agreement with the official numbers as published.

- Algeria (9)
- Australia (8)
- Belgium (9)
- East Germany (6)
- Egypt (1)
- England (8)
- Finland (7)
- France (9)
- Gibraltar (6)
- Iran (7)
- Ireland (7)
- Italy (9)
- Libya (7)
- Morocco (8)
- New Zealand (9)
- Northern Ireland (7)
- Saudi Arabia (6)
- Scotland (9)
- Spain (9)
- Sudan (7)
- Syria (6)
- Tunisia (9)
- United States (8)
- Wales (7)
- West Germany (7)

== See also ==
- 1975 IAAF World Cross Country Championships – Junior men's race
- 1975 IAAF World Cross Country Championships – Senior women's race
