= 1972 International Cross Country Championships =

- Organisers: ICCU
- Edition: 59th
- Date: 18 March
- Host city: Cambridge, Cambridgeshire, England
- Venue: Coldhams Common
- Events: 3
- Distances: 7.5 mi (12.1 km) men 4.35 mi (7.0 km) junior men 2.8 mi (4.5 km) women
- Participation: 200 athletes from 15 nations

The 1972 International Cross Country Championships was held in Cambridge, England, at the Coldhams Common on 18 March 1972. A report on the men's event was given in the Glasgow Herald. This was the last competition organized by the International Cross Country Union (ICCU). The organization of the event was transferred to the IAAF as recommended as a result of the meeting of the IAAF cross-country committee that year in London. It was continued as IAAF World Cross Country Championships. From then on, the event was open for all IAAF members whereas before, non-ICCU members were only allowed to compete after special invitation.

Complete results for men, junior men, women, medallists, and the results of British athletes were published.

== Medallists ==
Event	Gold		Silver		Bronze	
Individual
Men; 7.5 mi (12.1 km)	Gaston Roelants; Belgium	37:43	Mariano Haro; Spain	38:01	Ian Stewart; Scotland	38:20
Junior Men; 4.35 mi (7.0 km)	Aldo Tomasini; Italy	23:20	Jim Brown; Scotland	23:35	Franco Fava; Italy	23:45
Women; 2.8 mi (4.5 km)	Joyce Smith; England	16:11	Eileen Claugus; United States	16:13	Rita Ridley; England	16:19
Team
Men	England	84	Morocco	94	Belgium	140
Junior Men	Italy	19	England	22	Morocco	26
Women	England	22	United States	40	Scotland	64

== Individual Race Results ==
=== Men's (7.5 mi / 12.1 km) ===
Rank	Athlete	Nationality	Time
1st place, gold medalist(s)	Gaston Roelants	Belgium	37:43
2nd place, silver medalist(s)	Mariano Haro	Spain	38:01
3rd place, bronze medalist(s)	Ian Stewart	Scotland	38:20
4	Tapio Kantanen	Finland	38:25
5	Trevor Wright	England	38:26
6	Pekka Päivärinta	Finland	38:28
7	Eric de Beck	Belgium	38:31
8	Tony Simmons	England	38:36
9	Haddou Jaddour	Morocco	38:43
10	Lucien Rault	France	38:47
11	Mohamed Ben Abdelsalem	Morocco	38:50
12	Mejjati Lahcen	Morocco	38:52
13	Moumoh Haddou	Morocco	38:56
14	Juan Hidalgo	Spain	39:04
15	Allan Rushmer	England	39:16
16	Colin Robinson	England	39:16
17	Karel Lismont	Belgium	39:21
18	Grenville Tuck	England	39:28
19	Malcolm Thomas	Wales	39:33
20	Jim Alder	Scotland	39:35
21	Tony Ashton	Wales	39:37
22	Keith Angus	England	39:38
23	José Maiz	Spain	39:39
24	Amakdouf Layachi	Morocco	39:40
25	Ghazi Ben Lahcen	Morocco	39:40
26	Gabriele Barbaro	Italy	39:42
27	Lachie Stewart	Scotland	39:43
28	Neil Cusack	Ireland	39:45
29	Fritz Rüegsegger	Switzerland	39:47
30	Gerry Stevens	England	39:48
31	Christian Dudouet	France	39:49
32	Pat Gilseman	Ireland	39:52
33	Mohamed Sghir	Morocco	39:54
34	René Goris	Belgium	39:58
35	Jean-Yves Le Flohic	France	40:01
36	Alistair Blamire	Scotland	40:02
37	Ben Abdel Kader	Morocco	40:03
38	Francois Blommaerts	Belgium	40:04
39	Rauno Mattila	Finland	40:06
40	Tom O'Riordan	Ireland	40:07
41	Renato Martini	Italy	40:10
42	Santiago de la Parte	Spain	40:13
43	Gilbert Hanssens	Belgium	40:15
44	Andrew McKean	Scotland	40:16
45	Raimo Karsikas	Finland	40:17
46	Noel Tijou	France	40:18
47	René Jourdan	France	40:18
48	Hans Lang	Switzerland	40:22
49	Carlos Pérez	Spain	40:23
50	Eddy Rombaux	Belgium	40:29
51	Marcel Lechevallier	France	40:32
52	Paddy Coyle	Ireland	40:35
53	Bill Robinson	England	40:36
54	Mikko Ala-Leppilamppi	Finland	40:37
55	Albrecht Moser	Switzerland	40:40
56	Toni Zimmermann	Switzerland	40:41
57	Frank Grillaert	Belgium	40:47
58	Steve Kenyon	England	40:49
59	Sean O'Sullivan	Ireland	40:51
60	Bernie Plain	Wales	40:52
61	Franco Veronese	Italy	40:53
62	John Buckley	Ireland	40:59
63	Dennis Fowles	Wales	41:01
64	Franco Ambrosioni	Italy	41:01
65	Alfons Sidler	Switzerland	41:02
66	Giovanni Pizzi	Italy	41:09
67	Jörg Weber	Switzerland	41:10
68	Alan Cass	Wales	41:12
69	Jean-Pierre Ouine	France	41:13
70	Antoine Borowski	France	41:21
71	Francesco De Menego	Italy	41:27
72	Walter Fähndrich	Switzerland	41:27
73	Dick Wedlock	Scotland	41:28
74	Luigi Conti	Italy	41:29
75	John Phelan	Ireland	41:30
76	John Myatt	Scotland	41:34
77	Rafael García	Spain	41:36
78	Jean-Paul Le Gall	France	41:37
79	Frank Greally	Ireland	41:38
80	Mario Binato	Italy	41:52
81	Ian McCafferty	Scotland	41:54
82	John Jones	Wales	41:54
83	Javier Álvarez	Spain	41:56
84	Johan Janssens	Belgium	41:57
85	Veijo Sallinen	Finland	42:09
86	Ramon Tasende	Spain	42:19
87	Padraig Keane	Ireland	42:26
88	Gerry Hannon	Northern Ireland	42:31
89	Ian Morrison	Northern Ireland	42:36
90	Julio Gude	Spain	42:45
91	Jim Wight	Scotland	42:47
92	Dic Evans	Wales	42:56
93	Primo Gretter	Italy	42:56
94	Jim McGuinness	Northern Ireland	43:19
95	Nigel Evans	Wales	43:31
96	Brian Brookes	Wales	43:43
97	Roy Kernoghan	Northern Ireland	43:46
98	John McLaughlin	Northern Ireland	44:24
99	Ian Cotton	Northern Ireland	44:35
100	Kevin Morgan	Northern Ireland	45:29
101	Ernie Cunningham	Northern Ireland	45:59
102	Tom Quinn	Northern Ireland	46:16

=== Junior Men's (4.35 mi / 7.0 km) ===
Rank	Athlete	Nationality	Time
1st place, gold medalist(s)	Aldo Tomasini	Italy	23:20
2nd place, silver medalist(s)	Jim Brown	Scotland	23:35
3rd place, bronze medalist(s)	Franco Fava	Italy	23:45
4	David Black	England	23:48
5	Larbi M'Hidra	Morocco	23:58
6	Barry Smith	England	24:04
7	Ahmed Roubial	Morocco	24:07
8	Ricardo Ortega	Spain	24:09
9	Fernando Cerrada	Spain	24:18
10	José Haro	Spain	24:21
11	Kamel Guemar	Algeria	24:21
12	Dennis Coates	England	24:31
13	Paul Bannon	Scotland	24:33
14	Mohamed Chahin	Morocco	24:43
15	Luca Bigatello	Italy	24:46
16	Léon Schots	Belgium	24:53
17	Peter Ratcliffe	Wales	24:55
18	Mark Broeckx	Belgium	24:57
19	Robin Walker	Ireland	24:59
20	Laurence Reilly	Scotland	25:01
21	Abdelkrim Djelassi	Tunisia	25:03
22	Ben Aissa Ben Jelloun	Morocco	25:06
23	Ronald MacDonald	Scotland	25:13
24	Franz Bühler	Switzerland	25:14
25	Hanspeter Stauffacher	Switzerland	25:17
26	Eamonn Coghlan	Ireland	25:18
27	Taieb Merdassi	Tunisia	25:19
28	Brian Donovan	Wales	25:20
29	Robert Lismont	Belgium	25:21
30	Francisco Morera	Spain	25:23
31	Tony Staynings	England	25:28
32	Desmond O'Connor	Ireland	25:32
33	John Davies	Wales	25:37
34	Franky Calus	Belgium	25:41
35	Julian Goater	England	25:42
36	Lakhdar Boulkhoukh	Algeria	25:50
37	Steve Slocombe	Wales	25:51
38	Hugo Wey	Switzerland	25:53
39	Abdelmadjid Mada	Algeria	26:03
40	Richard Samuels	Wales	26:05
41	Mohamed Moussa	Tunisia	26:16
42	Mohamed Ben Tayeb	Algeria	26:23
43	Paul Moeyaert	Belgium	26:24
44	Mohamed Ouertani	Tunisia	26:26
45	Tom Hesketh	Northern Ireland	26:34
46	Michael Treacy	Ireland	26:40
47	Phil English	Ireland	26:57
48	Roberto Volpi	Italy	26:58
49	Dessi Martin	Northern Ireland	27:00
50	Lawrie Spence	Scotland	27:04
51	Paul Younger	Northern Ireland	27:25
52	Martin Donaldson	Northern Ireland	28:19
—	José Luis Ruiz	Spain	DNF
—	Mario Brembilla	Italy	DNF

=== Women's (2.8 mi / 4.5 km) ===
Rank	Athlete	Nationality	Time
1st place, gold medalist(s)	Joyce Smith	England	16:11
2nd place, silver medalist(s)	Eileen Claugus	United States	16:13
3rd place, bronze medalist(s)	Rita Ridley	England	16:19
4	Josee van Santberghe	Belgium	16:20
5	Margaret Coomber	Scotland	16:31
6	Paola Pigni	Italy	16:34
7	Sheila Carey	England	16:42
8	Jean Lochhead	Wales	16:43
9	Caroline Walker	United States	16:45
10	Giuseppina Torello	Italy	16:47
11	Ann Yeoman	England	16:49
12	Joan Allison	England	16:52
13	Mary Lynch	Ireland	16:55
14	Beth Bonner	United States	16:57
15	Deborah Roth	United States	17:03
16	Tena Anex	United States	17:03
17	Mary Stewart	Scotland	17:05
18	Angela Lovell	England	17:09
19	Christine Haskett	Scotland	17:10
20	Deirdre Foreman	Ireland	17:11
21	Bronwen Cardy	Wales	17:19
22	Ann Cumming	Ireland	17:19
23	Ann Barrass	Scotland	17:21
24	Margherita Gargano	Italy	17:26
25	Jane Hill	United States	17:30
26	Bernadette van Roy	Belgium	17:31
27	Rosemary Stirling	Scotland	17:33
28	Waltraud Egger	Italy	17:35
29	Mary Speedman	Scotland	17:36
30	Susan Barnes	Wales	17:37
31	Carmen Valero	Spain	17:51
32	Liève van den Broeck	Belgium	17:54
33	Mary Kelly	Ireland	17:57
34	Thelwyn Bateman	Wales	18:13
35	Beatrice Lambert	Ireland	18:18
36	Marion Hepworth	Wales	18:29
37	Lesley John	Wales	18:32
38	Magda Versluys	Belgium	18:43
39	Lutgard van Brempt	Belgium	18:48
40	Grazia Bertoldo Retter	Italy	18:56
41	Pamela Reece	Northern Ireland	19:09
42	Christine Gleeson	Ireland	19:25
43	Angela Kirkpatrick	Northern Ireland	21:13
—	Zina Boniolo	Italy	DNF

== Team Results ==
=== Men's ===
Rank	Country	Team	Points
1	England	Trevor Wright; Tony Simmons; Allan Rushmer; Colin Robinson; Grenville Tuck; Keith Angus	84
2	Morocco	Haddou Jaddour; Mohamed Ben Abdelsalem; Mejjati Lahcen; Moumoh Haddou; Amakdouf Layachi; Ghazi Ben Lahcen	94
3	Belgium	Gaston Roelants; Eric de Beck; Karel Lismont; René Goris; Francois Blommaerts; Gilbert Hanssens	140
4	Scotland	Ian Stewart; Jim Alder; Lachie Stewart; Alistair Blamire; Andrew McKean; Dick Wedlock	203
5	Spain	Mariano Haro; Juan Hidalgo; José Maiz; Santiago de la Parte; Carlos Pérez; Rafael García	207
6	France	Lucien Rault; Christian Dudouet; Jean-Yves Le Flohic; Noel Tijou; René Jourdan; Marcel Lechevallier	220
7	Finland	Tapio Kantanen; Pekka Päivärinta; Rauno Mattila; Raimo Karsikas; Mikko Ala-Leppilamppi; Veijo Sallinen	233
8	Ireland	Neil Cusack; Pat Gilseman; Tom O'Riordan; Paddy Coyle; Sean O'Sullivan; John Buckley	273
9	Wales	Malcolm Thomas; Tony Ashton; Bernie Plain; Dennis Fowles; Alan Cass; John Jones	313
10	Switzerland	Fritz Rüegsegger; Hans Lang; Albrecht Moser; Toni Zimmermann; Alfons Sidler; Jörg Weber	320
11	Italy	Gabriele Barbaro; Renato Martini; Franco Veronese; Franco Ambrosioni; Giovanni Pizzi; Francesco De Menego	329
12	Northern Ireland	Gerry Hannon; Ian Morrison; Jim McGuinness; Roy Kernoghan; John McLaughlin; Ian Cotton	565

=== Junior Men's ===
Rank	Country	Team	Points
1	Italy	Aldo Tomasini; Franco Fava; Luca Bigatello	19
2	England	David Black; Barry Smith; Dennis Coates	22
3	Morocco	Larbi M'Hidra; Ahmed Roubial; Mohamed Chahin	26
4	Spain	Ricardo Ortega; Fernando Cerrada; José Haro	27
5	Scotland	Jim Brown; Paul Bannon; Laurence Reilly	35
6	Belgium	Léon Schots; Mark Broeckx; Robert Lismont	63
7	Ireland	Robin Walker; Eamonn Coghlan; Desmond O'Connor	77
8	Wales	Peter Ratcliffe; Brian Donovan; John Davies	78
9	Algeria	Kamel Guemar; Lakhdar Boulkhoukh; Abdelmadjid Mada	86
10	Switzerland	Franz Bühler; Hanspeter Stauffacher; Hugo Wey	87
11	Tunisia	Abdelkrim Djelassi; Taieb Merdassi; Mohamed Moussa	89
12	Northern Ireland	Tom Hesketh; Dessi Martin; Paul Younger	145

=== Women's ===
Rank	Country	Team	Points
1	England	Joyce Smith; Rita Ridley; Sheila Carey; Ann Yeoman	22
2	United States	Eileen Claugus; Caroline Walker; Beth Bonner; Deborah Roth	40
3	Scotland	Margaret Coomber; Mary Stewart; Christine Haskett; Ann Barrass	64
4	Italy	Paola Pigni; Giuseppina Torello; Margherita Gargano; Waltraud Egger	68
5	Ireland	Mary Lynch; Deirdre Foreman; Ann Cumming; Mary Kelly	88
6	Wales	Jean Lochhead; Bronwen Cardy; Susan Barnes; Thelwyn Bateman	93
7	Belgium	Josee van Santberghe; Bernadette van Roy; Liève van den Broeck; Magda Versluys	100

== Participation ==
An unofficial count yields the participation of 200 athletes from 15 countries.

- Algeria (4)
- Belgium (19)
- England (20)
- Finland (6)
- France (9)
- Ireland (20)
- Italy (20)
- Morocco (12)
- Northern Ireland (15)
- Scotland (20)
- Spain (15)
- Switzerland (10)
- Tunisia (4)
- United States (6)
- Wales (20)

== See also ==
- 1972 in athletics (track and field)
