= 1973 IAAF World Cross Country Championships – Junior men's race =

Junior men's race at the 1973 IAAF World Cross Country Championships
- Organisers: IAAF
- Edition: 1st
- Date: March 17
- Host city: Waregem, West Flanders, Belgium
- Venue: Hippodroom Waregem
- Events: 1
- Distances: 7 km – Junior men
- Participation: 55 athletes from 12 nations

The Junior men's race at the 1973 IAAF World Cross Country Championships was held in Waregem, Belgium, at the Hippodroom Waregem on March 17, 1973. A report on the event was given in the Glasgow Herald.

Complete results, medallists, and the results of British athletes were published.

== Race results ==
=== Junior men's race (7 km) ===
==== Individual ====
Rank	Athlete	Country	Time
1st place, gold medalist(s)	Jim Brown	Scotland	20:52.8
2nd place, silver medalist(s)	José Haro	Spain	21:00.6
3rd place, bronze medalist(s)	Léon Schots	Belgium	21:07.2
4	Franco Fava	Italy	21:15.2
5	Aldo Tomasini	Italy	21:27.6
6	Dennis Coates	England	21:27.6
7	José Luis Ruiz	Spain	21:32.2
8	Barry Smith	England	21:32.3
9	Fernando Cerrada	Spain	21:45
10	Tony Staynings	England	21:49
11	Reinosa Miramontes	Spain	21:49
12	Neil Coupland	England	21:49.1
13	Luca Bigatello	Italy	21:49.3
14	Ron MacDonald	Scotland	21:54.2
15	Jean-Luc Cherrier	France	21:58.4
16	Jean-Luc Lemire	France	22:02.2
17	David McMeekin	Scotland	
18	Philip Jeffrey	England	
19	Enrico Cantoreggi	Italy	
20	Thomas McCormack	Ireland	
21	Laurence Reilly	Scotland	
22	Bernhard Vifian	Switzerland	
23	Robert van der Zande	Belgium	
24	Gilbert Bessières	France	
25	Gabriele Beretta	Italy	
26	Carlos Cabral	Portugal	
27	Lawrie Spence	Scotland	
28	Markus Ryffel	Switzerland	
29	Greg Hannon	Northern Ireland	
30	Bouchaib Zouhri	Morocco	
31	Geert de Smet	Belgium	
32	Robert Lismont	Belgium	
33	Bernard Meseure	France	
34	Tony O'Leary	Ireland	
35	Gerard Kiernan	Ireland	
36	Gerry Deegan	Ireland	
37	Carlos Tavares	Portugal	
38	Mick O'Shea	Ireland	
39	Mohamed Naoumi	Morocco	
40	Aad Buys	Netherlands	
41	Claude Biteau	France	
42	Dessi Martin	Northern Ireland	
43	Jo Schout	Netherlands	
44	Luc Nuyts	Belgium	
45	Helder de Jesús	Portugal	
46	José Simoes	Portugal	
47	Brahim Benjalloun	Morocco	
48	Ahmed Sennaji	Morocco	
49	José Muambugi	Portugal	
50	Hugo Wey	Switzerland	
51	Peter McGouren	Northern Ireland	
52	René Tijs	Netherlands	
53	Gerry Price	Northern Ireland	
54	Peet-Jan van Zyl	Netherlands	
55	Ali Laanaya	Morocco	

==== Teams ====
Rank	Team	Points
1st place, gold medalist(s)	Spain: José Haro / 2; José Luis Ruiz / 7; Fernando Cerrada / 9; (Reinosa Miramontes) / (11)	18
2nd place, silver medalist(s)	Italy: Franco Fava / 4; Aldo Tomasini / 5; Luca Bigatello / 13; (Enrico Cantoreggi) / (19); (Gabriele Beretta) / (25)	22
3rd place, bronze medalist(s)	England: Dennis Coates / 6; Barry Smith / 8; Tony Staynings / 10; (Neil Coupland) / (12); (Philip Jeffrey) / (18)	24
4	Scotland: Jim Brown / 1; Ron MacDonald / 14; David McMeekin / 17; (Laurence Reilly) / (21); (Lawrie Spence) / (27)	32
5	France: Jean-Luc Cherrier / 15; Jean-Luc Lemire / 16; Gilbert Bessières / 24; (Bernard Meseure) / (33); (Claude Biteau) / (41)	55
6	Belgium: Léon Schots / 3; Robert van der Zande / 23; Geert de Smet / 31; (Robert Lismont) / (32); (Luc Nuyts) / (44)	57
7	Ireland: Thomas McCormack / 20; Tony O'Leary / 34; Gerard Kiernan / 35; (Gerry Deegan) / (36); (Mick O'Shea) / (38)	89
8	Switzerland: Bernhard Vifian / 22; Markus Ryffel / 28; Hugo Wey / 50	100
9	Portugal: Carlos Cabral / 26; Carlos Tavares / 37; Helder de Jesús / 45; (José Simoes) / (46); (José Muambugi) / (49)	108
10	Morocco: Bouchaib Zouhri / 30; Mohamed Naoumi / 39; Brahim Benjalloun / 47; (Ahmed Sennaji) / (48); (Ali Laanaya) / (55)	116
11	Northern Ireland: Greg Hannon / 29; Dessi Martin / 42; Peter McGouren / 51; (Gerry Price) / (53)	122
12	Netherlands: Aad Buys / 40; Jo Schout / 43; René Tijs / 52; (Peet-Jan van Zyl) / (54)	135

- Note: Athletes in parentheses did not score for their team

== Participation ==
An unofficial count yields the participation of 55 athletes from 12 countries in the Junior men's race. This is in agreement with the official numbers as published.

- Belgium (5)
- England (5)
- France (5)
- Ireland (5)
- Italy (5)
- Morocco (5)
- Netherlands (4)
- Northern Ireland (4)
- Portugal (5)
- Scotland (5)
- Spain (4)
- Switzerland (3)

== See also ==
- 1973 IAAF World Cross Country Championships – Senior men's race
- 1973 IAAF World Cross Country Championships – Senior women's race
