= 1973 IAAF World Cross Country Championships – Senior men's race =

Senior men's race at the 1973 IAAF World Cross Country Championships
- Organisers: IAAF
- Edition: 1st
- Date: 17 March
- Host city: Waregem, West Flanders, Belgium
- Venue: Hippodroom Waregem
- Events: 1
- Distances: 11.98 km – Senior men
- Participation: 156 athletes from 19 nations

The Senior men's race at the 1973 IAAF World Cross Country Championships was held in Waregem, Belgium, at the Hippodroom Waregem on 17 March 1973. A report on the event was given in the Glasgow Herald.

Complete results, medallists, and the results of British athletes were published.

== Protest and assault ==
The race consisted of separate Northern Ireland and Ireland teams. During the race, Irish rebel athletes disrupted the race in protest as they wanted Ireland to be represented by a unified team. Protesters entered the race at the one mile marker dressed in running gear and physically assaulted runners from several nations. Rod Dixon and Roger Clark fought back, giving the Irish protestors "bruised and battered" bodies.

== Race results ==
=== Senior men's race (11.98 km) ===
==== Individual ====
Rank	Athlete	Country	Time
1st place, gold medalist(s)	Pekka Päivärinta	Finland	35:46.4
2nd place, silver medalist(s)	Mariano Haro	Spain	35:46.5
3rd place, bronze medalist(s)	Rod Dixon	New Zealand	36:00
4	Tapio Kantanen	Finland	36:05
5	Willy Polleunis	Belgium	36:05
6	Roger Clark	England	36:08
7	Juan Hidalgo	Spain	36:12
8	Gaston Roelants	Belgium	36:13
9	Nikolay Sviridov	Soviet Union	36:19
10	Noel Tijou	France	36:21
11	Grenville Tuck	England	36:24
12	Dick Tayler	New Zealand	36:26
13	Norman Morrison	Scotland	36:31
14	Bryan Rose	New Zealand	36:38
15	Euan Robertson	New Zealand	36:45
16	Egbert Nijstad	Netherlands	36:46
17	Pavel Andreyev	Soviet Union	36:47
18	Eric de Beck	Belgium	
19	Erik Gijselinck	Belgium	
20	Abdelkader Zaddem	Tunisia	
21	Nikolay Puklakov	Soviet Union	
22	Boris Olyanitskiy	Soviet Union	
23	Valentin Zotov	Soviet Union	
24	Carlos Lopes	Portugal	
25	Eddie Leddy	Ireland	36:56
26	Malcolm Thomas	Wales	
27	Vladimir Merkushin	Soviet Union	
28	Karel Lismont	Belgium	
29	Steve Kenyon	England	
30	Andrew McKean	Scotland	
31	Marc Smet	Belgium	
32	Tony Simmons	England	
33	Bernie Plain	Wales	
34	Seppo Tuominen	Finland	
35	Giuseppe Cindolo	Italy	
36	Santiago de la Parte	Spain	
37	Adelaziz Bouguerra	Tunisia	
38	Eddie Gray	New Zealand	
39	Roelof Veld	Netherlands	
40	Edgard Salvé	Belgium	
41	Pierre Liardet	France	
42	Mike Baxter	England	
43	Seppo Nikkari	Finland	
44	Detlef Uhlemann	West Germany	
45	Lachie Stewart	Scotland	
46	Bernard Caraby	France	
47	Olavi Suomalainen	Finland	
48	Haico Scharn	Netherlands	
49	Daniel Fossé	France	
50	Dennis Fowles	Wales	
51	Pekka Tiihonen	Finland	
52	John van der Wansem	Netherlands	
53	Petras Simonelis	Soviet Union	
54	Nathan Healey	New Zealand	
55	John Jones	Wales	
56	Gerd Frähmcke	West Germany	
57	Jim Alder	Scotland	
58	José Maiz	Spain	
59	John Sheddan	New Zealand	
60	Risto Ala-Korpi	Finland	
61	Ricky Wilde	England	
62	Jean-Yves Le Flohic	France	
63	Donal Walsh	Ireland	
64	John McLaughlin	Northern Ireland	
65	René Jourdan	France	
66	Mohamed Ben Abdelsalem	Morocco	
67	Danny McDaid	Ireland	
68	Cherif Hannchi	Tunisia	
69	Paddy Coyle	Ireland	
70	Bill Robinson	England	
71	Fernand Kolbeck	France	
72	Adrian Weatherhead	Scotland	
73	Vadim Mokalov	Soviet Union	
74	Ian Gilmour	Scotland	
75	Mike Beevor	England	
76	Renato Martini	Italy	
77	Mansour Guettaya	Tunisia	
78	Saturnino Arcones	Spain	
79	Javier Álvarez	Spain	
80	Franco Veronese	Italy	
81	Jean-Paul Gomez	France	
82	Miloud Chenna	Morocco	
83	John Myatt	Scotland	
84	Tom O'Riordan	Ireland	
85	Dick Crowley	Ireland	
86	Bernie Ford	England	
87	Albrecht Moser	Switzerland	
88	Wilhelm Jungbluth	West Germany	
89	Tony Ashton	Wales	
90	Gaetano Pusterla	Italy	
91	Hamdouni Sghaier	Tunisia	
92	David Hopkins	Wales	
93	Moumoh Haddou	Morocco	
94	Karl-Heinz Betz	West Germany	
95	Mohamed Benbaraka	Morocco	
96	Luigi Zarcone	Italy	
97	Gabriele Barbaro	Italy	
98	Herman Parmentier	Belgium	
99	Labidi Ayachi	Tunisia	
100	Gerry Hannon	Northern Ireland	
101	Amakdouf Layachi	Morocco	
102	Ruben San Martin	Spain	
103	Ludwig Niedermeier	West Germany	
104	Esa Laitinen	Finland	
105	David Logue	Northern Ireland	
106	Clive Thomas	Wales	
107	Dahou Belghazi	Morocco	
108	Anacleto Pinto	Portugal	
109	Eddie Spillane	Ireland	
110	Brunello Bertolin	Italy	
111	Mustapha Oulghazi	Morocco	
112	Gérard Vervoort	France	
113	Julio Marujo	Portugal	
114	Mike Critchley	Wales	
115	Colin Falconer	Scotland	
116	Americo Barros	Portugal	
117	Pat Gilseman	Ireland	
118	Hussein Soltani	Tunisia	
119	Aniceto Simoes	Portugal	
120	Dick Wedlock	Scotland	
121	Piet Vonck	Netherlands	
122	Cidalio Caetano	Portugal	
123	Falko Will	West Germany	
124	Geert Jansen	Netherlands	
125	Roy Kernoghan	Northern Ireland	
126	Ian Morrison	Northern Ireland	
127	Mohamed Sghir	Morocco	
128	Brian Donovan	Wales	
129	Mario Binato	Italy	
130	Howard Healey	New Zealand	
131	Jos Hermens	Netherlands	
132	Abdelkrim Djelassi	Tunisia	
133	Vasco Pereira	Portugal	
134	Fernando Fernandez	Spain	
135	Peter Helmer	Denmark	
136	Armando Aldegalega	Portugal	
137	Tom Annett	Northern Ireland	
138	Arne Stigsen	Denmark	
139	Jean-Pierre Berset	Switzerland	
140	Hans Ruiter	Netherlands	
141	Jim McGuinness	Northern Ireland	
142	Jörgen Trangbaek	Denmark	
143	Erik Laursen	Denmark	
144	Bent Larsson	Denmark	
145	Dan Engell	Denmark	
146	Gerd Larsen	Denmark	
147	Dan Michaelsen	Denmark	
148	Arne Möller	Denmark	
–	Neil Cusack	Ireland	DNF
–	Fernando Mamede	Portugal	DNF
–	Umberto Risi	Italy	DNF
–	Willi Wagner	West Germany	DNF
–	Julio Gude	Spain	DNF
–	Wolfgang Krüger	West Germany	DNF
–	Haddou Jaddour	Morocco	DNF
–	Esko Lipsonen	Finland	DNF

==== Teams ====
Rank	Team	Points
1st place, gold medalist(s)	Belgium: Willy Polleunis / 5; Gaston Roelants / 8; Eric de Beck / 18; Erik Gijselinck / 19; Karel Lismont / 28; Marc Smet / 31; (Edgard Salvé) / (40); (Herman Parmentier) / (98)	109
2nd place, silver medalist(s)	Soviet Union: Nikolay Sviridov / 9; Pavel Andreyev / 17; Nikolay Puklakov / 21; Boris Olyanitskiy / 22; Valentin Zotov / 23; Vladimir Merkushin / 27; (Petras Simonelis) / (53); (Vadim Mokalov) / (73)	119
3rd place, bronze medalist(s)	New Zealand: Rod Dixon / 3; Dick Tayler / 12; Bryan Rose / 14; Euan Robertson / 15; Eddie Gray / 38; Nathan Healey / 54; (John Sheddan) / (59); (Howard Healey) / (130)	136
4	Finland: Pekka Päivärinta / 1; Tapio Kantanen / 4; Seppo Tuominen / 34; Seppo Nikkari / 43; Olavi Suomalainen / 47; Pekka Tiihonen / 51; (Risto Ala-Korpi) / (60); (Esa Laitinen) / (104); (Esko Lipsonen) / (DNF)	180
5	England: Roger Clark / 6; Grenville Tuck / 11; Steve Kenyon / 29; Tony Simmons / 32; Mike Baxter / 42; Ricky Wilde / 61; (Bill Robinson) / (70); (Mike Beevor) / (75); (Bernie Ford) / (86)	181
6	Spain: Mariano Haro / 2; Juan Hidalgo / 7; Santiago de la Parte / 36; José Maiz / 58; Saturnino Arcones / 78; Javier Alvarez / 79; (Ruben San Martin) / (102); (Fernando Fernandez) / (134); (Julio Gude) / (DNF)	260
7	France: Noel Tijou / 10; Pierre Liardet / 41; Bernard Caraby / 46; Daniel Fossé / 49; Jean-Yves Le Flohic / 62; René Jourdan / 65; (Fernand Kolbeck) / (71); (Jean-Paul Gomez) / (81); (Gérard Vervoort) / (112)	273
8	Scotland: Norman Morrison / 13; Andrew McKean / 30; Lachie Stewart / 45; Jim Alder / 57; Adrian Weatherhead / 72; Ian Gilmour / 74; (John Myatt) / (83); (Colin Falconer) / (115); (Dick Wedlock) / (120)	291
9	Wales: Malcolm Thomas / 26; Bernie Plain / 33; Dennis Fowles / 50; John Jones / 55; Tony Ashton / 89; David Hopkins / 92; (Clive Thomas) / (106); (Mike Critchley) / (114); (Brian Donovan) / (128)	345
10	Tunisia: Abdelkader Zaddem / 20; Adelaziz Bouguerra / 37; Cherif Hannchi / 68; Mansour Guettaya / 77; Hamdouni Sghaier / 91; Labidi Ayachi / 99; (Hussein Soltani) / (118); (Abdelkrim Djelassi) / (132)	392
11	Ireland: Eddie Leddy / 25; Donal Walsh / 63; Danny McDaid / 67; Paddy Coyle / 69; Tom O'Riordan / 84; Dick Crowley / 85; (Eddie Spillane) / (109); (Pat Gilseman) / (117); (Neil Cusack) / (DNF)	393
12	Netherlands: Egbert Nijstad / 16; Roelof Veld / 39; Haico Scharn / 48; John van der Wansem / 52; Piet Vonck / 121; Geert Jansen / 124; (Jos Hermens) / (131); (Hans Ruiter) / (140)	400
13	Italy: Giuseppe Cindolo / 35; Renato Martini / 76; Franco Veronese / 80; Gaetano Pusterla / 90; Luigi Zarcone / 96; Gabriele Barbaro / 97; (Brunello Bertolin) / (110); (Mario Binato) / (129); (Umberto Risi) / (DNF)	474
14	West Germany: Detlef Uhlemann / 44; Gerd Frähmcke / 56; Wilhelm Jungbluth / 88; Karl-Heinz Betz / 94; Ludwig Niedermeier / 103; Falko Will / 123; (Willi Wagner) / (DNF); (Wolfgang Krüger) / (DNF)	508
15	Morocco: Mohamed Ben Abdelsalem / 66; Miloud Chenna / 82; Moumoh Haddou / 93; Mohamed Benbaraka / 95; Amakdouf Layachi / 101; Dahou Belghazi / 107; (Mustapha Oulghazi) / (111); (Mohamed Sghir) / (127); (Haddou Jaddour) / (DNF)	544
16	Portugal: Carlos Lopes / 24; Anacleto Pinto / 108; Julio Marujo / 113; Americo Barros / 116; Aniceto Simoes / 119; Cidalio Caetano / 122; (Vasco Pereira) / (133); (Armando Aldegalega) / (136); (Fernando Mamede) / (DNF)	602
17	Northern Ireland: John McLaughlin / 64; Gerry Hannon / 100; David Logue / 105; Roy Kernoghan / 125; Ian Morrison / 126; Tom Annett / 137; (Jim McGuinness) / (141)	657
18	Denmark: Peter Helmer / 135; Arne Stigsen / 138; Jörgen Trangbaek / 142; Erik Laursen / 143; Bent Larsson / 144; Dan Engell / 145; (Gerd Larsen) / (146); (Dan Michaelsen) / (147); (Arne Möller) / (148)	847

- Note: Athletes in parentheses did not score for the team result

== Participation ==
An unofficial count yields the participation of 156 athletes from 19 countries in the Senior men's race, one athlete less than the official number published.

- Belgium (8)
- Denmark (9)
- England (9)
- Finland (9)
- France (9)
- Ireland (9)
- Italy (9)
- Morocco (9)
- Netherlands (8)
- New Zealand (8)
- Northern Ireland (7)
- Portugal (9)
- Scotland (9)
- Spain (9)
- Soviet Union (8)
- Switzerland (2)
- Tunisia (8)
- Wales (9)
- West Germany (8)

== See also ==
- 1973 IAAF World Cross Country Championships – Junior men's race
- 1973 IAAF World Cross Country Championships – Senior women's race
