= 1973 IAAF World Cross Country Championships =

- Organisers: IAAF
- Edition: 1st
- Date: March 17
- Host city: Waregem, West Flanders, Belgium
- Venue: Hippodroom Waregem
- Events: 3
- Distances: 12 km – Senior men 7 km – Junior men 4 km – Senior women
- Participation: 286 athletes from 21 nations

The 1973 IAAF World Cross Country Championships was held in Waregem, Belgium, at the Hippodroom Waregem on March 17, 1973. A report on the event was given in the Glasgow Herald.

Complete results for men, junior men, women, medallists, and the results of British athletes were published.

== Medallists ==
| Event | Gold | | Silver | | Bronze | |
|---|---|---|---|---|---|---|
Individual
| Senior men (12 km) | Pekka Päivärinta; Finland | 35:46.4 | Mariano Haro; Spain | 35:46.5 | Rod Dixon; New Zealand | 36:00 |
| Junior men (7 km) | Jim Brown; Scotland | 20:52.8 | José Haro; Spain | 21:00.6 | Léon Schots; Belgium | 21:07.2 |
| Senior women (4 km) | Paola Pigni; Italy | 13:45.2 | Joyce Smith; England | 13:58 | Josee van Santberghe; Belgium | 14:01 |
Team
| Senior men | Belgium | 109 | Soviet Union | 119 | New Zealand | 136 |
| Junior men | Spain | 18 | Italy | 22 | England | 24 |
| Senior women | England | 40 | Finland | 73 | United States | 90 |

== Race results ==
=== Senior men's race (12 km) ===
Individual race
| Rank | Athlete | Country | Time |
|---|---|---|---|
| 1st place, gold medalist(s) | Pekka Päivärinta | Finland | 35:46.4 |
| 2nd place, silver medalist(s) | Mariano Haro | Spain | 35:46.5 |
| 3rd place, bronze medalist(s) | Rod Dixon | New Zealand | 36:00 |
| 4 | Tapio Kantanen | Finland | 36:05 |
| 5 | Willy Polleunis | Belgium | 36:05 |
| 6 | Roger Clark | England | 36:08 |
| 7 | Juan Hidalgo | Spain | 36:12 |
| 8 | Gaston Roelants | Belgium | 36:13 |
| 9 | Nikolay Sviridov | Soviet Union | 36:19 |
| 10 | Noel Tijou | France | 36:21 |
| 11 | Grenville Tuck | England | 36:24 |
| 12 | Dick Tayler | New Zealand | 36:26 |
Full results

Teams
| Rank | Team | Points |
|---|---|---|
| 1st place, gold medalist(s) | Belgium: Willy Polleunis / 5; Gaston Roelants / 8; Eric de Beck / 18; Erik Gijselinck / 19; Karel Lismont / 28; Marc Smet / 31; (Edgard Salvé) / (40); (Herman Parmentier) / (98) | 109 |
| 2nd place, silver medalist(s) | Soviet Union: Nikolay Sviridov / 9; Pavel Andreyev / 17; Nikolay Puklakov / 21; Boris Olyanitskiy / 22; Valentin Zotov / 23; Vladimir Merkushin / 27; (Petras Simonelis) / (53); (Vadim Mokalov) / (73) | 119 |
| 3rd place, bronze medalist(s) | New Zealand: Rod Dixon / 3; Dick Tayler / 12; Bryan Rose / 14; Euan Robertson / 15; Eddie Gray / 38; Nathan Healey / 54; (John Sheddan) / (59); (Howard Healey) / (130) | 136 |
| 4 | Finland | 180 |
| 5 | England | 181 |
| 6 | Spain | 260 |
| 7 | France | 273 |
| 8 | Scotland | 291 |
Full results

- Note: Athletes in parentheses did not score for the team result

=== Junior men's race (7 km) ===
Individual race
| Rank | Athlete | Country | Time |
|---|---|---|---|
| 1st place, gold medalist(s) | Jim Brown | Scotland | 20:52.8 |
| 2nd place, silver medalist(s) | José Haro | Spain | 21:00.6 |
| 3rd place, bronze medalist(s) | Léon Schots | Belgium | 21:07.2 |
| 4 | Franco Fava | Italy | 21:15.2 |
| 5 | Aldo Tomasini | Italy | 21:27.6 |
| 6 | Dennis Coates | England | 21:27.6 |
| 7 | José Luis Ruiz | Spain | 21:32.2 |
| 8 | Barry Smith | England | 21:32.3 |
| 9 | Fernando Cerrada | Spain | 21:45 |
| 10 | Tony Staynings | England | 21:49 |
| 11 | Reinosa Miramontes | Spain | 21:49 |
| 12 | Neil Coupland | England | 21:49.1 |
Full results

Teams
| Rank | Team | Points |
|---|---|---|
| 1st place, gold medalist(s) | Spain: José Haro / 2; José Luis Ruiz / 7; Fernando Cerrada / 9; (Reinosa Miramontes) / (11) | 18 |
| 2nd place, silver medalist(s) | Italy: Franco Fava / 4; Aldo Tomasini / 5; Luca Bigatello / 13; (Enrico Cantoreggi) / (19); (Gabriele Beretta) / (25) | 22 |
| 3rd place, bronze medalist(s) | England: Dennis Coates / 6; Barry Smith / 8; Tony Staynings / 10; (Neil Coupland) / (12); (Philip Jeffrey) / (18) | 24 |
| 4 | Scotland | 32 |
| 5 | France | 55 |
| 6 | Belgium | 57 |
| 7 | Ireland | 89 |
| 8 | Switzerland | 100 |
Full results

- Note: Athletes in parentheses did not score for the team result

=== Senior women's race (4 km) ===
Individual race
| Rank | Athlete | Country | Time |
|---|---|---|---|
| 1st place, gold medalist(s) | Paola Pigni | Italy | 13:45.2 |
| 2nd place, silver medalist(s) | Joyce Smith | England | 13:58 |
| 3rd place, bronze medalist(s) | Josee van Santberghe | Belgium | 14:01 |
| 4 | Rita Ridley | England | 14:02 |
| 5 | Sinikka Tyynelä | Finland | 14:09 |
| 6 | Jean Lochhead | Wales | 14:12 |
| 7 | Marijke Moser | Switzerland | 14:13 |
| 8 | Irja Pettinen | Finland | 14:14 |
| 9 | Anne Garrett | New Zealand | 14:15 |
| 10 | Nina Holmén | Finland | 14:16 |
| 11 | Annie van de Kerkhof | Netherlands | 14:20 |
| 12 | Marleen Mols | Belgium | 14:21 |
Full results

Teams
| Rank | Team | Points |
|---|---|---|
| 1st place, gold medalist(s) | England: Joyce Smith / 2; Rita Ridley / 4; Penny Yule / 14; Carol Gould / 20; (Barbara Banks) / (23); (Norine Braithwaite) / (37) | 40 |
| 2nd place, silver medalist(s) | Finland: Sinikka Tyynelä / 5; Irja Pettinen / 8; Nina Holmén / 10; Aila Koivistoinen / 50 | 73 |
| 3rd place, bronze medalist(s) | United States: Doris Brown / 15; Francie Larrieu / 16; Vicki Foltz / 29; Caroline Walker / 30; (Valerie Eberley) / (32); (Katy McIntyre) / (40) | 90 |
| 4 | Italy | 96 |
| 5 | West Germany | 99 |
| 6 | New Zealand | 103 |
| 7 | Belgium | 107 |
| 8 | Ireland | 115 |
Full results

- Note: Athletes in parentheses did not score for the team result

== Medal table (unofficial) ==
* Host nation (Belgium)

| Rank | Nation | Gold | Silver | Bronze | Total |
|---|---|---|---|---|---|
| 1 | Spain | 1 | 2 | 0 | 3 |
| 2 | England | 1 | 1 | 1 | 3 |
| 3 | Finland | 1 | 1 | 0 | 2 |
| 3 | Italy | 1 | 1 | 0 | 2 |
| 5 | Belgium* | 1 | 0 | 2 | 3 |
| 6 | Scotland | 1 | 0 | 0 | 1 |
| 7 | Soviet Union | 0 | 1 | 0 | 1 |
| 8 | New Zealand | 0 | 0 | 2 | 2 |
| 9 | United States | 0 | 0 | 1 | 1 |
| Totals (9 entries) | | 6 | 6 | 6 | 18 |

- Note: Totals include both individual and team medals, with medals in the team competition counting as one medal.

== Participation ==
An unofficial count yields the participation of 286 athletes from 21 countries.

- Belgium (19)
- Canada (1)
- Denmark (9)
- England (20)
- Finland (13)
- France (20)
- Ireland (20)
- Italy (19)
- Morocco (14)
- Netherlands (16)
- New Zealand (14)
- Northern Ireland (12)
- Portugal (14)
- Scotland (20)
- Soviet Union (8)
- Spain (19)
- Switzerland (6)
- Tunisia (8)
- United States (6)
- Wales (15)
- West Germany (13)

== See also ==
- 1973 IAAF World Cross Country Championships – Senior men's race
- 1973 IAAF World Cross Country Championships – Junior men's race
- 1973 IAAF World Cross Country Championships – Senior women's race
- 1973 in athletics (track and field)
