= Athletics at the 1976 Summer Olympics – Men's marathon =

Men's marathon at the Games of the XXI Olympiad
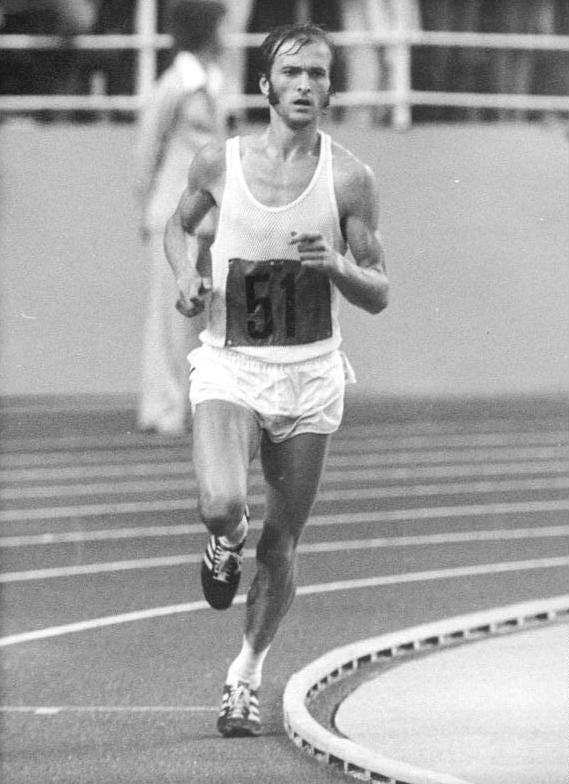
- Waldemar Cierpinski, 1976 Summer Olympics men's marathon winner
- Venue: Olympic Stadium, Montreal
- Date: July 31, 1976
- Competitors: 67 from 36 nations
- Winning time: 2:09:55 OR

Medalists
1st place, gold medalist(s)		Waldemar Cierpinski; East Germany
2nd place, silver medalist(s)		Frank Shorter; United States
3rd place, bronze medalist(s)		Karel Lismont; Belgium

The men's marathon at the 1976 Summer Olympics in Montreal, Canada, was held on Saturday July 31, 1976. The race started at 17:30 local time. There were 67 competitors from 36 countries. Seven of them did not finish. The maximum number of athletes per nation had been set at 3 since the 1930 Olympic Congress. The event was won by Waldemar Cierpinski of East Germany, the first Olympic marathon medal by any German runner. Frank Shorter of the United States and Karel Lismont of Belgium became the third and fourth men to win a second medal in the event, each one place behind their 1972 results. Ethiopia's four-Games marathon medal streak ended, as the nation boycotted the Games. The winner, Cierpinski, famously ran an extra lap of the stadium, not knowing that he had finished one lap prior.

== Background ==
This was the 18th appearance of the event, which is one of 12 athletics events to have been held at every Summer Olympics. Returning runners from the 1972 marathon included defending champion Frank Shorter of the United States, silver medalist Karel Lismont of Belgium, and eighth-place finisher Jack Foster of New Zealand. Shorter had also won four consecutive Fukuoka Marathons from 1971 through 1974 and was favored in this race. Significant contenders included his countryman Bill Rodgers (1975 Boston Marathon winner), Jerome Drayton of Canada (1975 Fukuoka winner), and Akio Usami (9th in 1968 and 12th in 1972) and Shigeru So of Japan. Lasse Virén had just finished defending the double in the 5000 metres and 10000 metres; having never run a marathon before, he entered this event hoping to match Emil Zátopek's 1952 triple.

Bermuda, Honduras, Papua New Guinea, and Paraguay each made their first appearance in Olympic marathons. The United States made its 18th appearance, the only nation to have competed in each Olympic marathon to that point.

== Competition format and course ==
As all Olympic marathons, the competition was a single race. The marathon distance of 26 miles, 385 yards was run over an out-and-back route.

== Records ==
These were the standing world and Olympic records prior to the 1976 Summer Olympics.

World record	Derek Clayton (AUS)	2:08:33.6	Antwerp, Belgium	30 May 1969
Olympic record	Abebe Bikila (ETH)	2:12:11.2	Tokyo, Japan	21 October 1964

Waldemar Cierpinski set a new Olympic best with 2:09:55.0.

== Schedule ==
Contrary to previous report, it did not rain throughout the race (in-person account from attendant at miles 10, 24, and 25.9). Light rain was sporadic & occasional. Temperature was about 70F (20C) at 10 mile mark.

All times are Eastern Daylight Time (UTC-4)

Date	Time	Round
Saturday, 31 July 1976	17:30	Final

== Results ==
Rank	Athlete	Nation	Time	Notes
1st place, gold medalist(s)	Waldemar Cierpinski	East Germany	2:09:55	OR
2nd place, silver medalist(s)	Frank Shorter	United States	2:10:45	
3rd place, bronze medalist(s)	Karel Lismont	Belgium	2:11:12	
4	Don Kardong	United States	2:11:15	
5	Lasse Virén	Finland	2:13:10	
6	Jerome Drayton	Canada	2:13:30	
7	Leonid Moseyev	Soviet Union	2:13:33	
8	Franco Fava	Italy	2:14:24	
9	Aleksandr Gotsky	Soviet Union	2:15:34	
10	Henri Schoofs	Belgium	2:15:52	
11	Shivnath Singh	India	2:16:22	
12	Chang Sop-choe	North Korea	2:16:33	
13	Massimo Magnani	Italy	2:16:56	
14	Göran Bengtsson	Sweden	2:17:39	
15	Kazimierz Orzeł	Poland	2:17:43	
16	Håkan Spik	Finland	2:17:50	
17	Jack Foster	New Zealand	2:17:53	
18	Mario Cuevas	Mexico	2:18:08	
19	Rodolfo Gómez	Mexico	2:18:21	
20	Shigeru So	Japan	2:18:26	
21	Noriyasu Mizukami	Japan	2:18:44	
22	Anacleto Pinto	Portugal	2:18:53	
23	José de Jesús	Puerto Rico	2:19:34	
24	Yuri Velikorodny	Soviet Union	2:19:45	
25	Jos Hermens	Netherlands	2:19:48	
26	Jeffrey Norman	Great Britain	2:20:04	
27	Jukka Toivola	Finland	2:20:46	
28	Jørgen Jensen	Denmark	2:20:44	
29	Mikhail Koussis	Greece	2:21:42	
30	Tom Howard	Canada	2:22:08	
31	Keith Angus	Great Britain	2:22:18	
32	Akio Usami	Japan	2:22:29	
33	Rigoberto Mendoza	Cuba	2:22:43	
34	Fernand Kolbeck	France	2:22:56	
35	Chris Wardlaw	Australia	2:23:56	
36	Wayne Yetman	Canada	2:24:17	
37	Hüseyin Aktaş	Turkey	2:24:30	
38	Veli Balli	Turkey	2:24:47	
39	James McNamara	Ireland	2:24:57	
40	Bill Rodgers	United States	2:25:14	
41	Hipólito López	Honduras	2:26:00	
42	Danny McDaid	Ireland	2:27:07	
43	Eusebio Cardoso	Paraguay	2:27:22	
44	Kim Chang-Son	North Korea	2:27:38	
45	Barry Watson	Great Britain	2:28:32	
46	Agustin Fernández-Diaz	Spain	2:28:37	
47	Jerzy Gros	Poland	2:28:45	
48	Jairo Cubillos	Colombia	2:29:04	
49	Luis Raudales	Honduras	2:29:25	
50	Baikuntha Manandhar	Nepal	2:30:07	
51	Antonio Baños	Spain	2:31:01	
52	Koh Chun-son	North Korea	2:31:54	
53	Víctor Serrano	Puerto Rico	2:34:59	
54	Günter Mielke	West Germany	2:35:44	
55	Neil Cusack	Ireland	2:35:47	
56	Tau John Tokwepota	Papua New Guinea	2:38:04	
57	Víctor Idava	Philippines	2:38:23	
58	Raymond Swan	Bermuda	2:39:18	
59	John Kokinai	Papua New Guinea	2:41:49	
60	Lucio Guachalla	Bolivia	2:45:31	
—	David Chettle	Australia	DNF	
—	Ross Haywood	Australia	DNF	
—	Rafael Mora	Colombia	DNF	
—	Santiago Manguan	Spain	DNF	
—	Thancule Dezart	Haiti	DNF	
—	Giuseppe Cindolo	Italy	DNF	
—	Kevin Ryan	New Zealand	DNF	
—	Charles Olemus	Haiti	DNS	
—	Ilie Floroiu	Romania	DNS	
—	Carlos Lopes	Portugal	DNS	
—	Gaston Roelants	Belgium	DNS	
