= 1969 European Indoor Games – Men's 3000 metres =

The men's 3000 metres event at the 1969 European Indoor Games was held on 9 March in Belgrade.

== Results ==
Rank	Name	Nationality	Time	Notes
1st place, gold medalist(s)	Ian Stewart	Great Britain	7:55.4	
2nd place, silver medalist(s)	Javier Álvarez	Spain	7:56.2	
3rd place, bronze medalist(s)	Werner Girke	West Germany	7:56.8	
4	Lajos Mecser	Hungary	8:01.0	
5	Pavel Pěnkava	Czechoslovakia	8:03.2	
6	Dane Korica	Yugoslavia	8:04.4	
7	Umberto Risi	Italy	8:04.4	
8	Stanisław Podzoba	Poland	8:09.6	
9	José Morera	Spain	8:10.6	
10	Rolf Hesselvall	Sweden	8:11.8	
11	Nedeljko Farčić	Yugoslavia	8:12.2	
