= Ricky Wilde (athlete) =

British long-distance runner (1945–2019)

Personal information
- Nationality: British (English)
- Born: 13 October 1945 Lancashire, England
- Died: 24 September 2019 (aged 73)

Sport
- Sport: Athletics
- Event: long distance
- Club: Manchester Harriers and Athletics Club
Medal record
Men's athletics
Representing Great Britain
European Indoor Championships
Gold medal – first place	1970 Vienna	3000 m

Richard Spencer Wilde (13 October 1945 – 24 September 2019) was a British male long-distance runner. He was a world indoor record holder and a gold medallist at the European Athletics Indoor Championships in 1970.

== Biography ==
Wilde won the 4-mile Nos Galan in 1967, was the North of England champion over 3 miles in 1968, then became British Universities champion in the 5000 metres in 1969. He began to establish himself nationally shortly after.

He was runner-up to Ian McCafferty over 3000 metres at the AAA Indoor Championships in 1968 and 1969 before finally succeeding his rival in 1970. He also took third in the 5000 m behind Ian Stewart and Alan Blinston at the 1969 AAA Championships.

Wilde's greatest achievement was a world indoor best of 7:46.85 to win the 3000m gold medal at the 1970 European Athletics Indoor Championships. This stood as the championship record until 1973, when it was bettered by Emiel Puttemans of Belgium. That same year he placed sixth at the 1970 International Cross Country Championships and shared in the team title alongside individual medallists Mike Tagg and Trevor Wright. He made one more major international appearance, coming 61st at the 1973 IAAF World Cross Country Championships.

He entered the 1972 Maxol Marathon in Manchester but his finish in 2:23:04 hours was only worth 36th place. He had better long-distance performances in his later career, taking the 10-mile Snowdon Race in 1977 and 1978 before being beaten into second place by Jeff Norman in 1979. His best marathon outing was at the 1979 Grandma's Marathon, which he won in a time of 2:14:44 hours. He was an accomplished fell runner, setting a long-lasting course record for the Lantern Pike fell race in addition to wins at the Fairfield horseshoe and Darwen moors races. Other notable performances were a win at the 1978 Paavo Nurmi Marathon and runner-up finishes at the Juan Muguerza Memorial and Campaccio cross country races.

He was a member of Manchester Harriers and Athletics Club during his career.

== International competitions ==
Year	Competition	Venue	Position	Event	Notes
1970	International Cross Country Championships	Vichy, France	6th	Senior race	37:07
1970	International Cross Country Championships	Vichy, France	1st	Senior team	35 pts
1970	European Indoor Championships	Vienna, Austria	1st	3000 m	7:46.85 WR
1973	World Cross Country Championships	Waregem, Belgium	61st	Senior race	
1973	World Cross Country Championships	Waregem, Belgium	5th	Senior team	181 pts

== National titles ==
- AAA Indoor Championships
  - 3000 m: 1970
