= Athletics at the 1970 Summer Universiade – Men's 5000 metres =

The men's 5000 metres event at the 1970 Summer Universiade was held at the Stadio Comunale in Turin on 5 and 6 September 1970.

== Medalists ==
Gold	Silver	Bronze
Nikolay Puklakov; Soviet Union	Jens Wollenberg; West Germany	Giuseppe Cindolo; Italy

== Results ==
=== Heats ===
Rank	Heat	Athlete	Nationality	Time	Notes
1	1	Giuseppe Cindolo	Italy	14:08.2	Q
2	1	Donald Walsh	Ireland	14:09.8	Q
3	1	Jens Wollenberg	West Germany	14:11.6	Q
4	1	Otsuki Kenichi	Japan	14:12.4	Q
5	1	Frank Briscoe	Great Britain	14:12.8	Q
6	1	Cherif Benali	Algeria	14:15.2	q
7	1	Markku Salminen	Finland	14:20.0	q
8	1	Julio Quevedo	Guatemala	14:20.4	
9	1	Dick Buerkle	United States	14:30.6	
10	1	Askres Abera	Ethiopia	15:07.2	
	1	John Axsentieff	Australia	DNF	
	1	Pierre Viaux	France	DNF	
1	2	Dušan Grahovac	Yugoslavia	14:24.2	Q
2	2	Gyula Tóth	Hungary	14:26.6	Q
3	2	Ulrich Brugger	West Germany	14:30.0	Q
4	2	René Goris	Belgium	14:33.6	Q
5	2	Nikolay Puklakov	Soviet Union	14:40.8	Q
6	2	Tilahun Asefa	Ethiopia	15:31.4	
	2	José Morera	Spain	DNF	

=== Final ===
Rank	Name	Nationality	Time	Notes
1st place, gold medalist(s)	Nikolay Puklakov	Soviet Union	13:56.4	
2nd place, silver medalist(s)	Jens Wollenberg	West Germany	14:00.8	
3rd place, bronze medalist(s)	Giuseppe Cindolo	Italy	14:01.4	
4	Otsuki Kenichi	Japan	14:01.8	
5	René Goris	Belgium	14:03.0	
6	Dušan Grahovac	Yugoslavia	14:13.4	
7	Cherif Benali	Algeria	14:19.6	
8	Ulrich Brugger	West Germany	14:23.4	
9	Frank Briscoe	Great Britain	14:26.0	
10	Gyula Tóth	Hungary	14:33.0	
11	Markku Salminen	Finland	14:45.4	
12	Donald Walsh	Ireland	14:53.4	
	Franco Arese	Italy	DNF	
	Hans Müller	Austria	DNF	
