= Athletics at the 1979 Pan American Games – Men's marathon =

Men's marathon at the 1979 Pan American Games
- Venue: Estadio Sixto Escobar
- Dates: 14 July
- Winning time: 2:24:09

Medalists
Gold medal	Radamés González	Cuba
Silver medal	Luis Barbosa	Colombia
Bronze medal	Rich Hughson	Canada

The men's marathon competition of the athletics events at the 1979 Pan American Games finished at the Estadio Sixto Escobar. The defending Pan American Games champion was Rigoberto Mendoza of Cuba.

== Records ==
Prior to this competition, the existing world and Pan American Games records were as follows:

World record	Shigeru So (JPN)	2:09:05.6	Japan	February 5, 1978
Pan American Games record	Frank Shorter (USA)	2:22:40	Cali, Colombia	1971

== Results ==
KEY:	WR	World Record	GR	Pan American Record

Rank	Name	Nationality	Time	Notes
1st place, gold medalist(s)	Radamés González	Cuba	2:24:09	
2nd place, silver medalist(s)	Luis Barbosa	Colombia	2:24:44	
3rd place, bronze medalist(s)	Rich Hughson	Canada	2:25:34	
4	Héctor Rodríguez	Colombia	2:25:51	
5	Edmundo Warnke	Chile	2:26:14	
6	Tom Fleming	United States	2:28:06	
7	Tom Howard	Canada	2:28:50	
8	Francisco Vargas	Puerto Rico	2:29:11	
9	Elói Schleder	Brazil	2:29:42	
10	Virgilio Herrera	Guatemala	2:31:53	
11	José de Jesús	Puerto Rico	2:34:35	
12	Raymond Swan	Bermuda	2:42:15	
13	Hipólito López	Honduras	2:43:08	
14	José Hernández	El Salvador	2:43:16	
15	Wallace Williams	Virgin Islands	3:22:12	
	Robert Doyle	United States	DNF	
	Hilario Álvarez	Mexico	DNF	
	Rafael Ángel Pérez	Costa Rica	DNF	
	Miguel Ángel Legorreta	Mexico	DNF	
	Aldo Allen	Cuba	DNF	
	José Medina	Venezuela	DNS	
