= Cantoreggi =

Cantoreggi is a surname. Notable people with the surname include:

- Enrico Cantoreggi (born 1952), Italian long-distance runner
- Iva Cantoreggi (1913–2005), Swiss journalist and suffragist
- Sandrine Cantoreggi (born 1969), Luxembourg violinist
