= José de Jesús =

José de Jesús is a given name and also a full name, and may refer to:

- José Corazón de Jesús (1896-1932), Filipino poet and song lyricist in the Tagalog language
- Jose de Jesus, Filipino politician, Secretary of the Department of Transportation and Communications 2010-2011 under President Benigno Aquino III
- José de Jesús (athlete), a Puerto Rican long-distance runner, competed in the marathon at the 1976 Summer Olympics
- José de Jesús (athlete), Mexican runner, bronze in half-marathon at 2001 Central American and Caribbean Championships in Athletics
- José de Jesús (boxer), "Cagüitas", Puerto Rican boxer and light flyweight champion
- José DeJesús, Puerto Rican baseball pitcher for the Kansas City Royals
- José de Jesús (cyclist), Vuelta a Tenerife
