= Tiihonen =

Tiihonen is a Finnish surname. Notable people with the surname include:

- Pekka Tiihonen (born 1947), Finnish long-distance runner
- Ilpo Tiihonen (1950–2021), Finnish writer
- Cheek (born 1981), the stage name of Jare Henrik Tiihonen, Finnish rapper
