= Mohamed Makdouf =

Moroccan middle-distance runner

Personal information
- Nationality: Moroccan
- Born: 5 June 1949 (age 77)

Sport
- Sport: Middle-distance running
- Event: 1500 metres
Medal record
Men's athletics
Representing Morocco
International Cross Country Championships
| Silver medal – second place | 1972 Cambridge | Men's team |

Mohamed Al-Makdouf Layachi (born 5 June 1949) is a Moroccan middle-distance runner. He competed in the men's 1500 metres at the 1972 Summer Olympics.

Layachi competed internationally for Morocco at the 1969 International Cross Country Championships, finishing 13th overall in the junior men's race. He won his first medal at the 1972 International Cross Country Championships, placing 24th in the senior race as the 5th scorer on Morocco's silver medal-winning team.

Later that year, Layachi finished 7th in his Olympic 1500 m heat, failing to advance to the finals. He returned to cross country competition at the 1973 IAAF World Cross Country Championships, placing 101st overall in the senior men's race on Morocco's 15th-place team.

Layachi was scheduled to compete in the 1500 m at the 1976 Olympics, but the Moroccan Olympic Committee decided to withdraw mid-way through the Games as part of the 1976 Olympic boycott, preventing Layachi from competing.
