= Dave Obelkevich =

American marathon runner

Dave Obelkevich (born 1942 or 1943) is an American marathon runner. He has run over 300 marathons and ultramarathons, including every New York City Marathons since 1976, according to the New York Road Runners. Born in Binghamton, New York, he ran his first marathon in 1974.
