= 1967 European Indoor Games – Men's 3000 metres =

The men's 3000 metres event at the 1967 European Indoor Games was held on 12 March in Prague.

== Results ==
Rank	Name	Nationality	Time	Notes
1st place, gold medalist(s)	Werner Girke	West Germany	7:58.6	
2nd place, silver medalist(s)	Rashid Sharafyetdinov	Soviet Union	7:59.0	
3rd place, bronze medalist(s)	Lajos Mecser	Hungary	8:00.6	
4	Märt Vilt	Soviet Union	8:02.2	NR
5	Ian McCafferty	Great Britain	8:10.0	
6	José Morera	Spain	8:10.6	
7	Ivan Pavličević	Yugoslavia	8:11.6	
8	Karel Szotkowski	Czechoslovakia	8:20.4	
