= Athletics at the 1977 Summer Universiade – Men's 10,000 metres =

The men's 10,000 metres event at the 1977 Summer Universiade was held at the Vasil Levski National Stadium in Sofia on 19 August.

== Results ==
Rank	Athlete	Nationality	Time	Notes
1st place, gold medalist(s)	Leonid Moseyev	Soviet Union	29:12.0	
2nd place, silver medalist(s)	Franco Fava	Italy	29:12.7	
3rd place, bronze medalist(s)	Ilie Floroiu	Romania	29:13.4	
4	Satymkul Dzhumanazarov	Soviet Union	29:19.4	
5	Ryszard Kopijarz	Poland	29:34.4	
6	Dieter Poschmann	West Germany	29:40.9	
7	Enrique Aquino	Mexico	29:46.0	
8	Aldo Magnani	Italy	29:49.2	
9	James Brown	Great Britain	30:08.8	
10	Jukka Toivola	Finland	30:12.9	
11	Ricardo Ortega	Spain	30:32.8	
12	Yordan Chilikov	Bulgaria	30:34.3	
13	Takao Nakamura	Japan	30:34.5	
14	José de Jesús	Puerto Rico	31:34.6	
15	Jean-Michel Charbonnel	France	31:34.8	
16	Peter Butler	Canada	31:59.9	
17	Veselin Vasilev	Bulgaria	32:04.9	
18	Badamraa Munkhdalai	Mongolia	32:42.3	
19	Joseph Mareka	Kenya	33:58.5	
