= 1970 European Athletics Indoor Championships – Men's 3000 metres =

The men's 3000 metres event at the 1970 European Athletics Indoor Championships was held on 14 and 15 March in Vienna.

== Medalists ==
Gold	Silver	Bronze
Ricky Wilde; Great Britain	Harald Norpoth; West Germany	Javier Álvarez; Spain

== Results ==
=== Heats ===
First 4 in each heat (Q) qualified directly for the final.

Rank	Heat	Name	Nationality	Time	Notes
1	1	Ricky Wilde	Great Britain	8:01.4	Q
2	1	Harald Norpoth	West Germany	8:02.0	Q
3	1	Emiel Puttemans	Belgium	8:02.3	Q
4	1	Jørn Lauenborg	Denmark	8:03.1	Q
5	1	Pavel Pěnkava	Czechoslovakia	8:04.6	
6	1	Seppo Tuominen	Finland	8:09.6	
1	2	Nikolay Sviridov	Soviet Union	8:11.8	Q
2	2	Werner Girke	West Germany	8:13.0	Q
3	2	Kazimierz Maranda	Poland	8:13.6	Q
4	2	Javier Álvarez	Spain	8:13.8	Q
5	2	Umberto Risi	Italy	8:17.0	
6	2	Terje Schrøder-Nielsen	Norway	8:18.0	
7	2	Richard Fink	Austria	8:26.6	

=== Final ===
Rank	Name	Nationality	Time	Notes
1st place, gold medalist(s)	Ricky Wilde	Great Britain	7:46.85	WB
2nd place, silver medalist(s)	Harald Norpoth	West Germany	7:49.50	
3rd place, bronze medalist(s)	Javier Álvarez	Spain	7:52.45	
4	Nikolay Sviridov	Soviet Union	7:54.6	
5	Werner Girke	West Germany	7:56.0	
6	Emiel Puttemans	Belgium	7:57.0	
7	Jørn Lauenborg	Denmark	7:58.2	
8	Kazimierz Maranda	Poland	8:07.2	
