= 1969 European Athletics Championships – Men's marathon =

Men's marathon at the European Athletics Championships

The men's marathon at the 1969 European Athletics Championships was held in Athens, Greece, on 21 September 1969.

== Medalists ==
Gold	Ron Hill; Great Britain
Silver	Gaston Roelants; Belgium
Bronze	Jim Alder; Great Britain

== Results ==
=== Final ===
21 September

Rank	Name	Nationality	Time	Notes
1st place, gold medalist(s)	Ron Hill	Great Britain	2:16:47.8	
2nd place, silver medalist(s)	Gaston Roelants	Belgium	2:17:22.2	
3rd place, bronze medalist(s)	Jim Alder	Great Britain	2:19:05.8	
4	Jürgen Busch	East Germany	2:19:34.4	
5	İsmail Akçay	Turkey	2:22:16.8	
6	Denes Simon	Hungary	2:22:58.8	
7	Michał Wójcik	Poland	2:23:36.6	
8	Yuriy Volkov	Soviet Union	2:24:09.6	
9	Maurice Peiren	Belgium	2:24:10.6	
10	Anatoliy Skripnik	Soviet Union	2:25:14.8	
11	Hüseyin Aktaş	Turkey	2:27:51.0	
12	Zdzisław Bogusz	Poland	2:28:37.0	
13	Michael Molloy	Ireland	2:28:38.0	
14	Carlos Pérez	Spain	2:29:28.6	
15	Yury Velikorodnykh	Soviet Union	2:31:46.8	
16	Gyula Tóth	Hungary	2:32:24.6	
17	Nedo Farčić	Yugoslavia	2:35:57.0	
18	Aad Steylen	Netherlands	2:37:35.0	
19	Hamza Canavar	Turkey	2:39:45.0	
20	André Lacour	France	2:40:20.8	
21	Stanislav Petr	Czechoslovakia	2:40:44.0	
22	Gilbert Gauthier	France	2:45:31.0	
23	Jean-Marie Wagnon	France	2:47:19.0	
24	Nikolaos Avlakiotis	Greece	2:47:53.8	
25	Armando Aldegalega	Portugal	NT	
26	Georgios Fakiolas	Greece	NT	
27	Jimmy Parody	Gibraltar	NT	
	Bjarne Sletten	Norway	DNF	
	Bill Adcocks	Great Britain	DNF	
	Dimitrios Vouros	Greece	DNF	
	Pentti Rummakko	Finland	DNF	
	Václav Mládek	Czechoslovakia	DNF	

== Participation ==
According to an unofficial count, 32 athletes from 18 countries participated in the event.

- Belgium (2)
- Czechoslovakia (2)
- East Germany (1)
- Finland (1)
- France (3)
- Gibraltar (1)
- Greece (3)
- Hungary (2)
- Ireland (1)
- Netherlands (1)
- Norway (1)
- Poland (2)
- Portugal (1)
- Soviet Union (3)
- Spain (1)
- Turkey (3)
- Great Britain (3)
- Yugoslavia (1)
