= 1976 New York City Marathon =

Footrace held in New York City

- Date: October 24, 1976
- Location: (United States) New York City, NY
- Event type: Marathon
- Distance: 26.2 mi (42.195 km)
- Edition: 7th
- Course records: 2:10:09 (1976 men); 2:39:11 (1976 women)
- Website: Official website

The 1976 New York City Marathon was the 7th edition of the New York City Marathon and took place in New York City on October 24, 1976.

After running in this race, Catalan chemist Ramón Oliu was inspired to organize the first marathon in Catalonia, in Palafrugell in 1978. This race was also the first popular marathon in Spain, and eventually became the Barcelona Marathon.

== Results ==
=== Men ===
Rank	Athlete	Country	Time
1	Bill Rodgers	United States	2:10:09
2	Frank Shorter	United States	2:13:12
3	Christopher Stewart	United Kingdom	2:13:21
4	Richard Hughson	Canada	2:16:10
5	Pekka Päivärinta	Finland	2:16:17
6	Tom Fleming	United States	2:16:52
7	Carl Hatfield	United States	2:17:26
8	Daniel McDaid	Ireland	2:17:48
9	Günther Mielke	West Germany	2:18:16
10	Ron Hill	United Kingdom	2:19:43

=== Women ===
Rank	Athlete	Country	Time
1	Miki Gorman	United States	2:39:11
2	Doris Brown	United States	2:53:03
3	Toshiko D'Elia	United States	3:08:17
4	Lauri Pedrinan	United States	3:15:50
5	Cheryl Norton	United States	3:18:50
6	Louise Weschler	United States	3:19:11
7	Nina Kuscsik	United States	3:20:08
8	Elizabeth Curtin	United States	3:22:26
9	Toni Plantamura	United States	3:22:29
10	Jane Killion	United States	3:25:02
