= Víctor Idava =

Filipino long-distance runner

Personal information
- Nationality: Filipino
- Born: May 28, 1956 (age 70)
- Height: 5 ft 7 in (170 cm)
- Weight: 123 lb (56 kg)

Sport
- Sport: Long-distance running
- Event: Marathon

Víctor Idava (born May 28, 1956) is a Filipino long-distance runner. He competed in the marathon at the 1976 Summer Olympics.
