= Wayne Yetman =

Canadian long-distance runner

Personal information
- Born: 8 October 1946 (age 79) Toronto, Ontario, Canada

Sport
- Sport: Long-distance running
- Event: Marathon

Wayne Yetman (born 8 October 1946) is a Canadian long-distance runner. He competed in the marathon at the 1976 Summer Olympics.
