= Herman Parmentier =

Belgian long-distance runner (born 1947)

Personal information
- Born: 19 April 1947 (age 79)

Sport
- Country: Belgium
- Sport: Athletics
- Event: Cross country running
Medal record
Men's athletics
Representing Belgium
World Cross Country Championships
Gold medal – first place	1973 Waregem	Senior team

Herman Parmentier (born 19 April 1947) is a Belgian former long-distance runner. He was the team gold medalist in the men's race at the 1973 World Cross Country Championships. He was also the 1980 Belgian national champion in the marathon.

== Career ==
Parmentier was 8th at the 1973 Belgian Cross Country Championships. He was selected to the Belgian team in the men's race at the 1973 IAAF World Cross Country Championships. He placed 98th and was the last finisher for his nation, winning the team gold medal.

Parmentier was invited as a Belgian guest to a 10-mile run in Derbyshire, England, in July 1975.

Parmentier won the 1980 Belgian Athletics marathon championship in 2:12:31 hours on a short course approximately 40.6 kilometres (25.2 mi) in length. In Spring 1980, he won the Belgium Marathon in two hours and 11 minutes. Later that year, he finished 23rd at the 1980 New York City Marathon in a time of 2:18:08.6 hours.

In March 1983, Parmentier ran 1:05:16 hours to place 36th in a half marathon in The Hague, Netherlands.

Parmentier was 6th in the 1990 Brussels Marathon, running a time of 2:27:01 hours. He finished in the top 300 at the 1994 New York City Marathon, running 2:47:41 hours for 289th place.

== Personal life ==
Parmentier was born on 19 April 1947. He is from Aalst, East Flanders, Belgium.

He belonged to the now-defunct Atletiekclub Hekelgem club. He later joined the athletics division of SC Eendracht Aalst.
