= Barry Watson (athlete) =

British athlete

Personal information
- Nationality: British (English)
- Born: 13 February 1944 (age 82) Poole, Dorset, England
- Height: 166 cm (5 ft 5 in)
- Weight: 51 kg (112 lb)

Sport
- Sport: Athletics
- Event: marathon
- Club: Cambridge Harriers

Barrington J. Watson (born 13 February 1944) is a former Great British Olympian and long-distance runner who competed at the 1976 Summer Olympics.

== Biography ==
Watson was born in Poole, Dorset, England.

Watson became the British marathon champion after winning the British AAA Championships title at the 1976 AAA Championships.

Shortly afterwards at the 1976 Olympics Games in Montreal, he represented Great Britain and came 45th in the marathon. In 1977, he came second behind Steve Ovett in the first Dartford half marathon.

In 2005, he helped to establish the Somme Poppy Marathon.

== International competitions ==
Year	Competition	Venue	Position	Event	Notes
Representing United Kingdom
1976	Olympic Games	Montréal, Canada	45th	Marathon	2:28:32
