= Jerzy Gros =

Polish long-distance runner (1945–2018)

Personal information
- Nationality: Polish
- Born: 21 February 1945 Chorzów, Poland
- Died: 17 January 2018 (aged 72)

Sport
- Sport: Long-distance running
- Event: Marathon

Jerzy Gros (21 February 1945 – 17 January 2018) was a Polish long-distance runner. He competed in the marathon at the 1976 Summer Olympics.
