= Göran Bengtsson (athlete) =

Swedish long-distance runner

Personal information
- Nationality: Swedish
- Born: 25 November 1949 (age 76) Gothenburg, Sweden

Sport
- Sport: Long-distance running
- Event: Marathon

Göran Bengtsson (born 25 November 1949) is a Swedish long-distance runner. He competed in the marathon at the 1976 Summer Olympics.
