= Veli Balli =

Turkish long-distance runner

Personal information
- Nationality: Turkish
- Born: 10 December 1949 (age 76)

Sport
- Sport: Long-distance running
- Event: Marathon

Veli Balli (born 10 December 1949) is a Turkish long-distance runner. He competed in the marathon at the 1976 Summer Olympics.
