= Aleksandr Gotsky =

Soviet long-distance runner

Personal information
- Nationality: Soviet
- Born: 25 October 1947 (age 78)

Sport
- Sport: Long-distance running
- Event: Marathon

Aleksandr Gotsky (born 25 October 1947) is a Soviet long-distance runner. He competed in the marathon at the 1976 Summer Olympics.
