= Thancule Dezart =

Haitian long-distance runner

Personal information
- Nationality: Haitian
- Born: 15 April 1947 (age 79)

Sport
- Sport: Long-distance running
- Event: Marathon

Thancule Dezart (born 15 April 1947) is a Haitian long-distance runner. He competed in the marathon at the 1976 Summer Olympics.
