= Gateshead Harriers =

Athletics club in Gateshead, England

- Founded: 1904
- Ground: Gateshead International Stadium
- Location: Neilson Rd, Gateshead NE10 0EF, England
- Coordinates: 54°57′40″N 1°34′47″W
- Website: official website

Gateshead Harriers and Athletics Club is an athletics club based at Gateshead International Stadium in Gateshead, England. Historically, Gateshead Harriers & AC have trained on Tuesdays and Thursdays. This allows for competition to be commonly held on Sundays. Some athletes and training groups do however train on other days. The club caters for all athletes from ages 8+ to veterans in all track, field, road and cross country disciplines through winter and summer.

== History ==
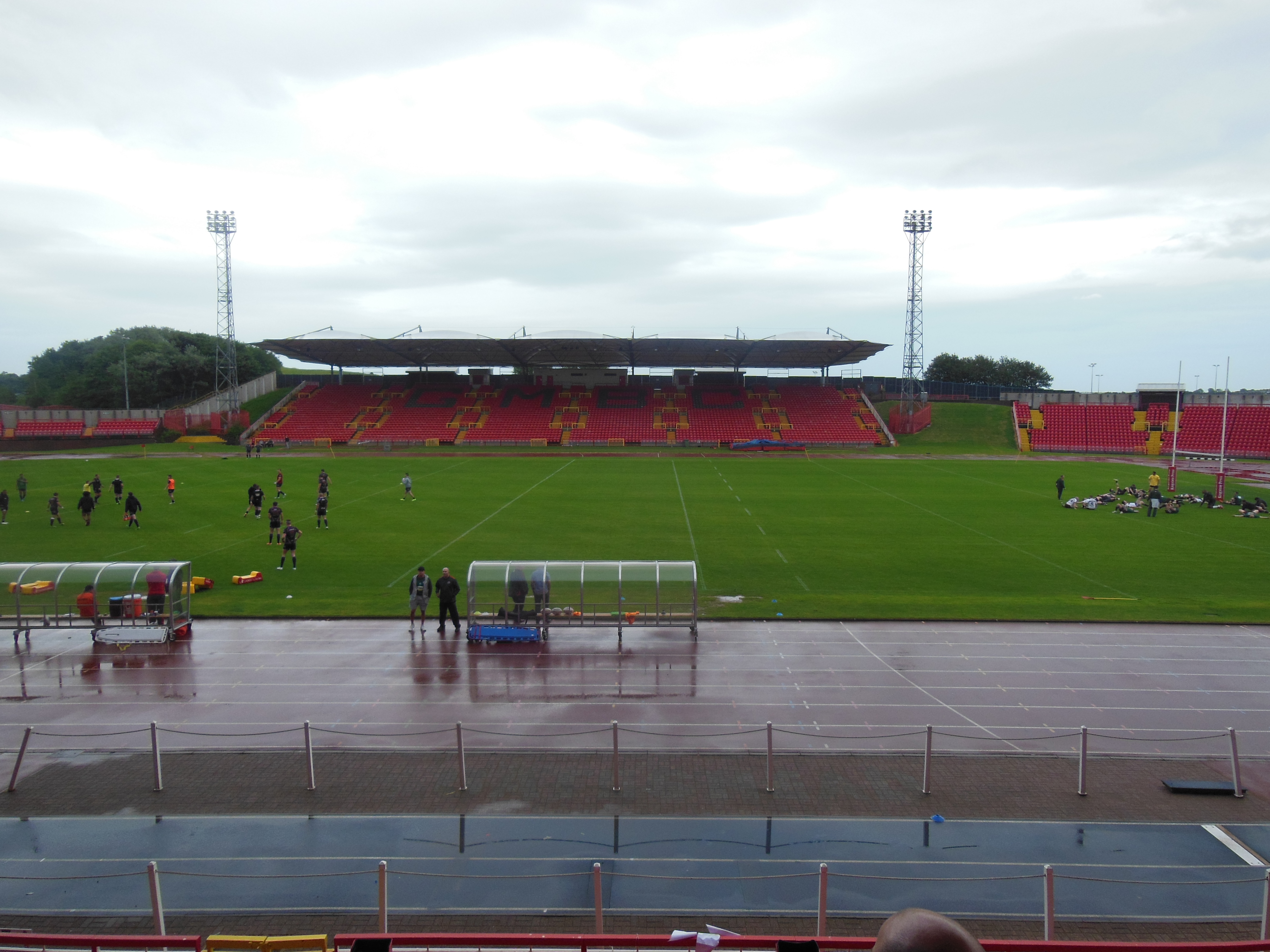
Gateshead International Stadium, home of the Harriers since 1956

Gateshead Harriers was founded in 1904 as Gateshead St. Mary's Church Running Club and soon afterwards was known as Gateshead St. Mary's Harriers.

Originally for men only, ladies were permitted to join from 1951 onwards and a women's section was set up in December 1952. In 1956, the club moved to its present site at Gateshead International Stadium (called the Gateshead Youth Stadium at the time).

== Notable athletes ==
=== Olympians ===
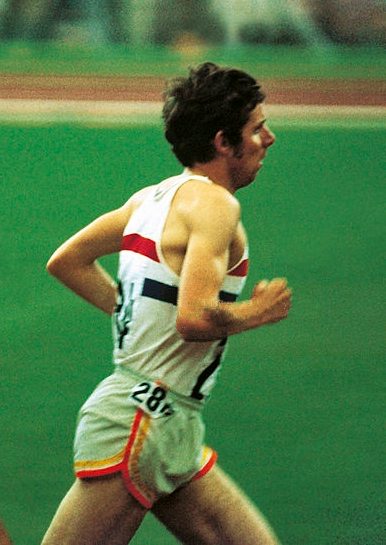
Brendan Foster

Athlete	Events	Games	Medals/Ref
Brendan Foster	1500, 5000m, 10,000m	1972, 1976, 1980	Bronze medal
David Jenkins	400m, 4x400m relay	1972, 1976, 1980	
Dennis Coates	3,000m Steeplechase	1976	
Barry Smith	5000m	1980	
Christina Boxer	800m, 1500m	1980, 1984, 1988	
Jonathan Edwards	triple jump	1988, 1992, 1996, 2000	Gold medal Silver medal
Angela Piggford	4x400m relay	1988	
Colin Walker	3000m steeplechase	1992	
Ross Murray	1500m	2012	
Richard Kilty	4x100m relay	2016, 2020	

=== Commonwealth Games ===
Athlete	Events	Games	Medals/Ref
John Caine	10,000m	1970	
