= Mario Cuevas =

Mexican long-distance runner

Mario Cuevas Valdez
Personal information
- Nationality: Mexican
- Born: 22 July 1949 (age 76)
- Height: 1.68 m (5 ft 6 in)
- Weight: 58 kg (128 lb)

Sport
- Sport: Long-distance running
- Event: Marathon

Mario Cuevas Valdez (born 22 July 1949) is a Mexican long-distance runner. He competed in the marathon at the 1976 Summer Olympics.

== International competitions ==
Year	Competition	Venue	Position	Event	Notes
Representing Mexico
1973	Central American and Caribbean Championships	Maracaibo, Venezuela	1st	Half marathon	1:05:07
1978	Olympic Games	Montreal, Canada	18th	Marathon	2:18:08
1977	Central American and Caribbean Championships	Xalapa, Mexico	2nd	Half marathon	1:07:07
1978	Central American and Caribbean Games	Medellín, Colombia	2nd	Marathon	2:23:07
1979	Central American and Caribbean Championships	Guadalajara, Mexico	1st	Marathon	1:26:24

== Personal bests ==
- Marathon – 2:16:03 (1975)
