= Niagara Falls Marathon =

Annual race in Canada held since 1974

- Date: October
- Location: Niagara Falls, Canada
- Event type: Road
- Distance: Marathon
- Established: 1974 (52 years ago)
- Website: Niagara Falls Marathon

The Niagara Falls Marathon (formerly the Niagara Falls International Marathon) is an annual marathon running competition in Niagara Falls, Ontario, Canada, first held in 1974.

It used to be run from Buffalo, New York, to Niagara Falls, Ontario, making it one of the few marathons in the world that starts in one country and finishes in another. Participants of the Niagara Falls International Marathon had to show a passport or NEXUS card at the start, which would be given back at the finish line or kept by the racer during the race.

After the COVID-19 pandemic, the marathon was held only in Canada.

== History ==
The marathon was first held on 26 October 1974 as the Skylon International Marathon, with Jesse Kregal as founder and race director. The race was named the Buffalo Niagara Falls International Marathon from 1983 to 1986.

In 1985, runners were led off the course, and used multiple different routes to get back on the course, resulting in unusual times and placements.

The marathon had a ten-year break from 1987 to 1996 before it was relaunched in 1997 as the Niagara Falls Marathon. From 1998 to 2008, it was known as the Casino Niagara International Marathon.

The course records are held by Peter Pfitzinger, who ran 2:17:10 in 1980, and Nicole Stevenson of Canada, whose time of 2:37:09 in 2004 is the women's record.

The 2020 and 2021 editions of the race were cancelled due to the COVID-19 pandemic.

Starting with the 2022 edition of the marathon, the race has been held entirely in Canada.

== Course ==
The marathon begins at Rapidsview Park, with runners following the Niagara Parkway towards Niagara Falls. Runners then turn around by Fallsview Casino and follow the parkway into Chippawa before turning around again, ending at Rapidsview Park.

== Winners ==
Key: Course record

| Ed. | Year | Men's winner | Time | Women's winner | Time | Rf. |
|---|---|---|---|---|---|---|
| 1 | 1974 | Russell Pate (USA) | 2:22:53 | Ellen Turkel (USA) | 2:58:16 | |
| 2 | 1975 | Marty Sudzina (USA) | 2:23:16 | Eleanor Thomas (CAN) | 3:16:18 | |
| 3 | 1976 | Bill Stewart (USA) | 2:24:01 | Patricia Hall | 2:58:49 | |
| 4 | 1977 | Richard Hughson (CAN) | 2:20:31 | Susan Kahler (USA) | 3:00:11 | |
| 5 | 1978 | Carl Hatfield (USA) | 2:17:21 | Jacqueline Gareau (CAN) | 2:57:01 | |
| 6 | 1979 | David Smith (USA) | 2:17:30.1 | Virginia Kraft (USA) | 2:52:18 | |
| 7 | 1980 | Peter Pfitzinger (USA) | 2:17:10 | Leslie Watson (GBR) | 2:54:57 | |
| 8 | 1981 | Terry Stanley (USA) | 2:18:50 | Nancy Mieszczak (USA) | 2:40:48 | |
| 9 | 1982 | Terry Stanley (USA) | 2:22:18 | Heather Clemenson (CAN) | 2:58:49 | |
| 10 | 1983 | Bernie Prabucki (USA) | 2:21:28 | Vicki Scanlon (CAN) | 2:56:38 | |
| 11 | 1984 | Rick Mannen (CAN) | 2:19:40 | Deborah Dye (USA) | 2:55:18 | |
| 12 | 1985 | Mark Coleman (USA) | 2:30:29 | Charlene MacDonald (CAN) | 3:07:20 | |
| 13 | 1986 | Kazuya Nishimoto (JPN) | 2:17:35 | Maria Grazia Navacchia (ITA) | 2:50:49 | |
| — | — | not held from 1987 to 1996 | | | | |
| 14 | 1997 | Glen Marttila (CAN) | 2:37:53 | Katie Dosser (CAN) | 2:55:41 | |
| 15 | 1998 | Brett Forgesson (BER) | 2:39:59 | Glenda Morris (CAN) | 3:06:31 | |
| 16 | 1999 | Smartex Tambala (MAW) | 2:29:13 | Eriko Asai (JPN) | 2:50:48 | |
| 17 | 2000 | Joseph Maina (KEN) | 2:21:45.2 | Danuta Bartoszek (CAN) | 2:38:29.8 | |
| 18 | 2001 | Jean-Paul Niyonsaba (BDI) | 2:24:28.5 | Danuta Bartoszek (CAN) | 2:46:42.4 | |
| 19 | 2002 | Shingirai Badza (ZIM) | 2:27:53.5 | Cindy Keeler (USA) | 2:50:18.3 | |
| 20 | 2003 | Wilson Komen (KEN) | 2:23:13.8 | Leslie Carson (CAN) | 2:54:25.5 | |
| 21 | 2004 | Moses Cheserek (KEN) | 2:22:22.0 | Nicole Stevenson (CAN) | 2:37:08.6 | |
| 22 | 2005 | Matthew McInnes (CAN) | 2:21:46.4 | Nicole Stevenson (CAN) | 2:46:41.7 | |
| 23 | 2006 | Simon Njoroge (KEN) | 2:18:12.9 | Elena Rozhko (UKR) | 2:43:16.1 | |
| 24 | 2007 | Thomas Omwenga (KEN) | 2:33:12.5 | Louise Voghel (CAN) | 3:02:36.3 | |
| 25 | 2008 | Matt Loiselle (CAN) | 2:27:33.2 | Elizabeth Primrose (CAN) | 2:55:26.6 | |
| 26 | 2009 | Andrew Smith (CAN) | 2:27:53.9 | Tara Quinn (CAN) | 2:46:40.9 | |
| 27 | 2010 | Steve Bohan (CAN) | 2:27:48.1 | Jill Gamble (CAN) | 2:56:10.8 | |
| 28 | 2011 | Brendan Kenny (CAN) | 2:28:47.7 | Meggan Franks (CAN) | 2:52:17.8 | |
| 29 | 2012 | Bernard Arasa (KEN) | 2:26:04.1 | Paula Wiltse (CAN) | 2:51:57.5 | |
| 30 | 2013 | Lucas McAneney (CAN) | 2:22:41.6 | Paula Wiltse (CAN) | 2:48:54.1 | |
| 31 | 2014 | Lucas McAneney (CAN) | 2:27:58.0 | Stephanie Strittmatter (USA) | 2:58:02.8 | |
| 32 | 2015 | Taylor Kraayenbrink (CAN) | 2:30:55 | Paulina Golic (POL) | 2:53:11 | |
| 33 | 2016 | David Savard-Gagnon (CAN) | 2:30:32 | Lindsay Moreau (CAN) | 3:17:28 | |
| 34 | 2017 | Stuart Galloway (CAN) | 2:51:07 | Al Tufano (USA) | 3:29:14 | |
| 35 | 2018 | Kyle Greig (GBR) | 2:28:45 | Courtney Laderer (USA) | 2:59:08 | |
| 36 | 2019 | Tom Anderson (USA) | 2:44:12 | Cassandra Tomas (CAN) | 3:18:20 | |
| — | 2020 | cancelled due to coronavirus pandemic | | | | |
| — | 2021 | cancelled due to coronavirus pandemic | | | | |
| 37 | 2022 | Alex Yu (CAN) | 2:35:13 | Tiffany Newell (CAN) | 2:52:24 | |
| 38 | 2023 | Alex Yu (CAN) | 2:37:08 | Wendy Rading (CAN) | 3:10:09 | |
| 39 | 2024 | Forrest Sears (USA) | 2:46:44 | Natalia Ovtcharenko (CAN) | 3:03:25 | |
| 40 | 2025 | Yuki Kawauchi (JAP) | 2:19:38 | Kaitlin Murray (USA) | 2:58:25 | |

== See also ==
- List of marathon races in North America
