= 1976 AAA Championships =

Outdoor track and field competition

- Dates: 13–14 August 1976
- Host city: London, England
- Venue: Crystal Palace National Sports Centre
- Level: Senior
- Type: Outdoor

The 1976 AAA Championships sponsored by Nationwide was the 1976 edition of the annual outdoor track and field competition organised by the Amateur Athletic Association (AAA). It was held from 13 to 14 August 1976 at the Crystal Palace National Sports Centre in London, England.

== Summary ==
The Championships covered two days of competition. The marathon was held in Rotherham and the decathlon was held in Cwmbran.

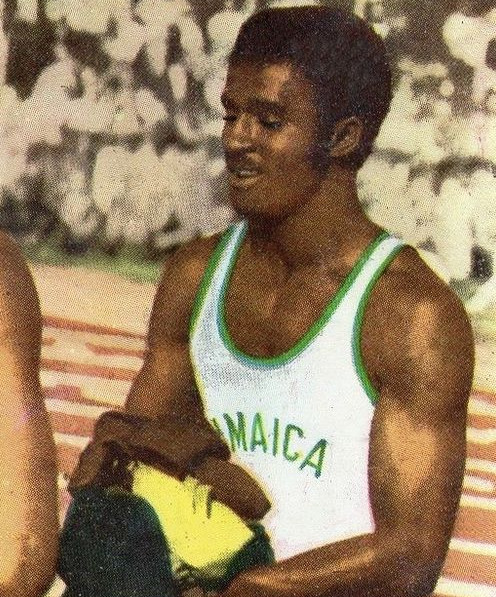
Don Quarrie won the sprint double

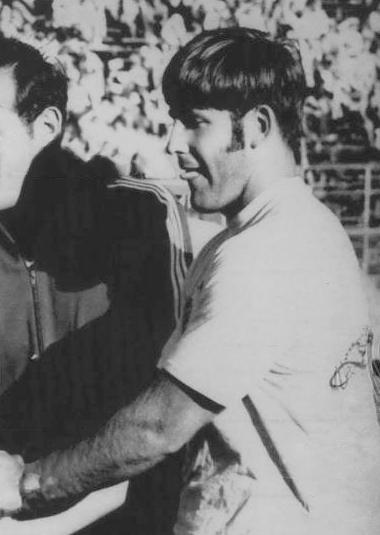
John Powell repeated his 1974 success in the hammer

== Results ==
Event	Gold		Silver		Bronze	
100m	(Jamaica) Don Quarrie	10.42	(Scotland) Allan Wells	10.62	Mike McFarlane	10.69
200m	(Jamaica) Don Quarrie	20.35	Glen Cohen	20.90	Ainsley Bennett	20.93
400m	(Scotland) David Jenkins	45.86	(Canada) Bryan Saunders	46.67	Jeff Griffiths	47.07
800m	Steve Ovett	1:47.33	(New Zealand) John Walker	1:47.75	(Scotland) David McMeekin	1:48.30
1,500m	(New Zealand) Rod Dixon	3:41.43	David Moorcroft	3:41.63	(Scotland) Frank Clement	3:41.86
5,000m	Brendan Foster	13:32.88	Nick Rose	13:37.01	Charlie Spedding	13:40.19
10,000m	(Netherlands) Gerard Tebroke	28:03.95	Keith Penny	28:39.64	Bernie Plain	28:41.67
marathon	Barry Watson	2:15:08	Jeff Norman	2:15:17	Keith Angus	2:15:55
3000m steeplechase	Tony Staynings	8:34.47	(Wales) Micky Morris	8:35.49	Pete Griffiths	8:36.56
110m hurdles	(Wales) Berwyn Price	13.80w	Bob Danville	13.99w	(Scotland) David Wilson	14.28w
400m hurdles	Alan Pascoe	49.57	Peter Kelly	51.34	David West	51.52
3,000m walk	Roger Mills	2:22.6	(New Zealand) Graham Seatter	13:01.4	Ken Carter	13:06.0
10,000m walk	Brian Adams	42:58.0	Roger Mills	43:01.0	Carl Lawton	45:10.0
high jump	Milton Palmer	2.06	Mike Butterfield	2.06	(Scotland) Angus McKenzie	2.06
pole vault	(United States) Mike Tully	5.33	Brian Hooper	5.20	Jeff Gutteridge	4.80
long jump	Roy Mitchell	7.93	Daley Thompson	7.28	Trevor Wells	7.04
triple jump	Aston Moore	16.30	Keith Connor	15.85	David Johnson	15.27
shot put	Geoff Capes	20.92	(United States) Pete Schmock	20.10	Mike Winch	18.39
discus throw	(United States) John Powell	65.52	Peter Tancred	56.68	(Scotland) Colin Sutherland	56.22
hammer throw	(Scotland) Chris Black	72.64	Jim Whitehead	64.90	(New Zealand) Murray Cheater	64.24
javelin throw	(Switzerland) Peter Maync	75.16	David Ottley	74.62	Brian Roberts	74.18
decathlon	Daley Thompson	7684	Mike Corden	7581	(Scotland) David Kidner	7199

== See also ==
- 1976 WAAA Championships
