= Rich Hughson =

Canadian marathon runner (born 1949)

Personal information
- Born: Richard Hughson; August 14, 1949 (age 76)

Sport
- Sport: Athletics
- Event: Marathon
Medal record
Representing Canada
Pan American Games
Bronze medal – third place	1979 San Juan	Marathon

Richard Hughson (born August 14, 1949) is a Canadian former athlete who competed in marathon events.

Hughson grew up in Ridgeway, Ontario, a small community near Fort Erie. He started training with the Spartan club in Hamilton and early in his career specialised in the 3000 metres steeplechase, winning a national junior championship in 1968, then setting a national junior record the following year.

Taking up marathon running in 1975, Hughson was fourth at the 1976 New York City Marathon and came second at the trials for that year's Olympics without getting selected for the team, with third-place finisher Tom Howard preferred ahead of him. He won the 1977 Niagara Falls International Marathon. In 1978, Hughson won his first national championship and set a personal best of 2:13:21 at the Fukuoka Marathon. He was a bronze medalist at the 1979 Pan American Games.

Hughson holds a PhD from McMaster University, where he was an assistant professor of kinesiology between 1977 and 1982. He became a professor of kinesiology at the University of Waterloo.
