= Cidálio Caetano =

Portuguese long-distance runner

Personal information
- Nationality: Portuguese
- Born: 22 January 1952 (age 74) Lisbon, Portugal

Sport
- Sport: Long-distance running
- Event: Marathon

Cidálio Caetano (born 22 January 1952) is a Portuguese long-distance runner. He competed in the marathon at the 1984 Summer Olympics.
