= Hossein Rabbi =

Iranian long-distance runner

Hossein Rabbi (Persian: حسین ربّی; born 21 March 1947 in Abhar, Iran) is an Iranian former long-distance runner who competed in the 1976 Summer Olympics in Montreal.

He specialized in the 5000 metres and 10,000 metres.
