= Gino Trambaiolo =

Italian long-distance runner

Personal information
- Full name: Luigi Trambaiolo
- Nationality: Italian
- Born: 3 January 1951 (age 75)

Sport
- Country: Italy
- Sport: Athletics
- Event: Long-distance running

Achievements and titles
- Personal best: 10,000 m: 29:45.6 (1975)

Gino Trambaiolo (born 3 January 1951) is a former Italian male long-distance runner who competed at one edition of the IAAF World Cross Country Championships at senior level (1975),
