= José de Jesús (athlete) =

Puerto Rican athlete

Personal information
- Full name: José Elías de Jesús
- Nationality: Puerto Rican
- Born: 18 September 1954 (age 71)
- Height: 1.68 m (5 ft 6 in)
- Weight: 52 kg (115 lb)

Sport
- Sport: Long-distance running
- Event: Marathon
Medal record
Representing Puerto Rico
Central American and Caribbean Games
Bronze medal – third place	1974 Santo Domingo	Marathon

José Elías de Jesús (born 18 September 1954) is a Puerto Rican long-distance runner. He competed in the marathon at the 1976 Summer Olympics.

== International competitions ==
Year	Competition	Venue	Position	Event	Notes
Representing Puerto Rico
1974	Central American and Caribbean Games	Santo Domingo, Dominican Republic	3rd	Marathon	2:32:54
1975	Pan American Games	Mexico City, Mexico	7th	Marathon	2:39:22
1976	Olympic Games	Montreal, Canada	23rd	Marathon	2:19:34
1977	Universiade	Sofia, Bulgaria	14th	10,000 m	31:34.6
1979	Pan American Games	San Juan, Puerto Rico	11th	Marathon	2:34:35

== Personal bests ==
- Marathon – 2:19:02 (1975)
