= Stefano Grazzini =

Italian long-distance runner

Personal information
- Nationality: Italian
- Born: 18 December 1952 (age 73)

Sport
- Country: Italy
- Sport: Athletics
- Event: Long-distance running
- Club: ASSI Giglio Rosso

Achievements and titles
- Personal best: 10,000 m: 29:32.4 (1976)

Stefano Grazzini (born 18 December 1952) is a former Italian male long-distance runner who competed at one edition of the IAAF World Cross Country Championships at senior level (1975),
