= René Goris =

Belgian long-distance runner

Personal information
- Nationality: Belgian
- Born: 1 February 1946 (age 80)

Sport
- Sport: Long-distance running
- Event: 5000 metres

René Goris (born 1 February 1946) is a Belgian long-distance runner. He competed in the men's 5000 metres at the 1972 Summer Olympics held in Munich, West Germany.

In 1970, he competed in the men's 5000 metres event at the 1970 Summer Universiade held in Turin, Italy.
