= Jean-Marie Conrath =

French long-distance runner

Personal information
- Nationality: French
- Born: 11 April 1952 (age 74) Strasbourg
- Height: 179 cm (5 ft 10 in)
- Weight: 65 kg (143 lb)

Sport
- Country: France
- Sport: Middle-distance running

Jean-Marie Conrath is a French Olympic long-distance runner. He represented his country in the men's 5000 meters at the 1976 Summer Olympics. His time was a 13:34.39.
