= David Chettle =

Australian long-distance runner

Personal information
- Nationality: Australian
- Born: 14 September 1951 (age 74)

Sport
- Sport: Long-distance running
- Event: Marathon

David Chettle (born 14 September 1951) is an Australian long-distance runner. He competed in the marathon at the 1976 Summer Olympics.
