= Barry Smith (runner) =

British long-distance runner

Personal information
- Nationality: British (English)
- Born: 16 April 1953 (age 72) London, England
- Height: 168 cm (5 ft 6 in)
- Weight: 60 kg (132 lb)

Sport
- Sport: Athletics
- Event: 5,000m
- Club: Gateshead Harriers

Barry David Smith (born 16 April 1953) is a British former long-distance runner who competed in the 1980 Summer Olympics.

== Biography ==
Smith was a frequent part of the English team at the IAAF World Cross Country Championships. After a junior team medal at the 1972 International Cross Country Championships and 1973 IAAF World Cross Country Championships, he broke through as a senior in 1977 by sharing in the team silver medals. He was part of the English team that on the championship in both 1979 and 1980.

At the 1980 Olympics Games in Moscow, he represented Great Britain in the 5,000 metres competition.

On the circuit he won the Antrim International Cross Country in 1981 and that same year won the 5000 m IAAF Golden Event ahead of Tolossa Kotu of Ethiopia and became the British 10,000 metres champion after winning the British AAA Championships title at the 1981 AAA Championships.
