= Raymond Swan =

Bermudian long-distance runner

Personal information
- Nationality: Bermudian
- Born: 7 December 1938 (age 87)

Sport
- Sport: Long-distance running
- Event: Marathon

Raymond Swan (born 7 December 1938) is a Bermudian long-distance runner. He competed in the marathon at the 1976 Summer Olympics.
