= Luca Bigatello =

Italian long-distance runner

Personal information
- Nationality: Italian
- Born: 10 November 1953 (age 72)

Sport
- Country: Italy
- Sport: Athletics
- Event: Long-distance running
Medal record
World Cross Country Championships
| Silver medal – second place | 1973 Waregem | Junior Team |
International Cross Country C'ships
| Gold medal – first place | 1972 Cambridge | Junior Team |

Luca Bigatello (born 15 September 1953) is a former Italian male long-distance runner who competed at one edition of the IAAF World Cross Country Championships at senior level (1974).
