= Enrico Cantoreggi =

Italian long-distance runner

Personal information
- Nationality: Italian
- Born: 5 May 1952 (age 74) Varese, Italy

Sport
- Country: Italy
- Sport: Athletics
- Event(s): Long-distance running 3000 metres steeplechase

Achievements and titles
- Personal best: 3000 m st: 8:30.6 (1975)
Medal record
World Cross Country Championships
Silver medal – second place	1973 Waregem	Junior Team

Enrico Cantoreggi (born 5 May 1952) is a former Italian male long-distance runner who competed at one edition of the IAAF World Cross Country Championships at senior level (1974).
