= Pekka Tiihonen =

Finnish long-distance runner

Personal information
- Nationality: Finnish
- Born: 29 June 1947 (age 79) Nilsiä, Finland

Sport
- Sport: Long-distance running
- Event: Marathon

Pekka Tiihonen (born 29 June 1947) is a Finnish long-distance runner. He competed in the marathon at the 1972 Summer Olympics.
