= Keith Angus =

British long-distance runner

Personal information
- Nationality: British (English)
- Born: 5 April 1943 (age 83) Sheffield, England
- Height: 170 cm (5 ft 7 in)
- Weight: 59 kg (130 lb)

Sport
- Sport: Long-distance running
- Event: Marathon
- Club: Sheffield AC

Keith Angus (born 5 April 1943) is a British long-distance runner who competed at the 1976 Summer Olympics.

== Biography ==
Angus competed for Sheffield Utd Harriers which later became Sheffield AC in 1975 Angus finished third behind Trevor Wright in the 10 miles event at the 1971 AAA Championships and third again the following year at the 1972 AAA Championships.

On 15th September 1971 Angus ran a 10k personal best at London in 28:45.8

Angus placed 4th at the 1972 English National Cross Country Championships and later that year was part of the winning England team at the World Cross Country Championship. He made one further appearance at the World Cross Country Championships in 1975, Rabat, Morocco.

Angus won the 1974 edition of the Košice Peace Marathon in a field that included future double Olympic Champion Waldermir Cierpinski, Ron Hill and Jack Foster. He moved to Nottingham in September 1974. He then twice finished on the podium in the marathon event at both the 1975 AAA Championships and 1976 AAA Championships. The 1976 AAA marathon also acted as the 1976 Olympic trial; it was run on a warm and testing course at Rotherham, and Angus set his personal best of 2:15.55, beating more fancied names that included the then world record holder Ian Thompson, Ron Hill, and Bernie Plain.

Angus won the 1975 CAU Intercounties 20 mile at Derby. At the 1976 Olympics Games in Montreal, he represented Great Britain in the marathon.

He was a teacher at Tapton House School in Chesterfield, where he resides.
