= Chris Wardlaw =

Australian long-distance runner

Personal information
- Nationality: Australian
- Born: 3 March 1950 (age 75) St Marys, New South Wales, Australia

Sport
- Sport: Long-distance running
- Event: Marathon

Chris Wardlaw (born 3 March 1950) is an Australian long-distance runner. He competed in the marathon at the 1976 Summer Olympics and the 1980 Summer Olympics.
