= Yury Velikorodnykh =

Soviet athlete

Personal information
- Nationality: Soviet
- Born: 18 February 1942 (age 83) Alexandrovsk, Perm Krai, Soviet Union

Sport
- Sport: Long-distance running
- Event: Marathon

Yury Velikorodnykh (born 18 February 1942) is a Soviet long-distance runner. He competed in the marathon at the 1972 Summer Olympics and the 1976 Summer Olympics.
