= Aldo Tomasini =

Italian long-distance runner

Personal information
- Nationality: Italian
- Born: 15 September 1952 (age 73)

Sport
- Country: Italy
- Sport: Athletics
- Event: Long-distance running

Achievements and titles
- Personal best: 5000 m: 13:43.0 (1974)
Medal record
World Cross Country Championships
Silver medal – second place	1973 Waregem	Junior Team
International Cross Country C'ships
Gold medal – first place	1972 Cambridge	Junior race
Gold medal – first place	1972 Cambridge	Junior Team
Bronze medal – third place	1970 Vichy	Junior Team
Bronze medal – third place	1971 San Sebastián	Junior Team

Aldo Tomasini (born 15 September 1952) is a former Italian male long-distance runner who competed at three editions of the IAAF World Cross Country Championships (from 1973 to 1975), and won three national championships at senior level (two outdoor and one indoor.
