= Anacleto Pinto =

Portuguese long-distance runner

Personal information
- Nationality: Portuguese
- Born: 25 February 1948 Viseu, Portugal
- Died: 21 March 2015 (aged 67) Tondela

Sport
- Sport: Long-distance running
- Event: Marathon

Anacleto Pinto (25 February 1948 – 21 March 2015) was a Portuguese long-distance runner. He competed in the marathon at the 1976 Summer Olympics and the 1980 Summer Olympics.
