= Gerd Frähmcke =

German middle-distance runner

Personal information
- Nationality: German
- Born: 22 September 1950 (age 75)

Sport
- Sport: Middle-distance running
- Event: Steeplechase

Gerd Frähmcke (born 22 September 1950) is a German middle-distance runner. He competed in the men's 3000 metres steeplechase at the 1976 Summer Olympics.
