= Gabriele Barbaro =

Italian long-distance runner

Personal information
- Nationality: Italian
- Born: 17 March 1950 (age 76) Treviso

Sport
- Country: Italy
- Sport: Athletics
- Event: Long-distance running

Achievements and titles
- Personal best: 10,000 m: 29:02.4 (1977)

Gabriele Barbaro (born 17 March 1950) is a former Italian male long-distance runner who competed at one edition of the IAAF World Cross Country Championships at senior level (1973),
