= Tony Staynings =

British middle-distance runner

Personal information
- Nationality: British (English)
- Born: 21 July 1953 (age 72) Hanover, West Germany
- Height: 169 cm (5 ft 7 in)
- Weight: 57 kg (126 lb)

Sport
- Sport: Middle-distance running
- Event: Steeplechase
- Club: Bristol & West AC

Anthony Robert Staynings (born 21 July 1953) is a British male retired middle-distance runner who competed at the 1976 Summer Olympics and the 1980 Summer Olympics.

== Biography ==
Staynings twice became the British 3000 metres steeplechase champion after winning the British AAA Championships titles at the 1975 AAA Championships and the 1976 AAA Championships.

At the 1976 Olympics Games in Montreal, he represented Great Britain in the 3000 metres steeplechase.

Staynings was an All-American runner for the Western Kentucky Hilltoppers track and field team, finishing runner-up in the 3000 metres at the 1977 NCAA Indoor Track and Field Championships.

Staynings finished runner-up behind Dennis Coates in successive years at the AAA Championships in 1977 and 1978 and shortly afterwards represented England in the 3,000 metres steeplechase event, at the 1978 Commonwealth Games in Edmonton, Alberta, Canada. He was also the winner of the 1977 UK Athletics Championships and 1980 UK Athletics Championships titles.

He appeared at his second Olympic Games at the 1980 Olympics Games in Moscow, representing Great Britain in the steeplechase again.
