= Werner Girke =

German long-distance runner (born 1940)

Personal information
- Nationality: German
- Born: 4 September 1940 (age 85) Grabik, Lower Silesia, Germany

Sport
- Sport: Long-distance running
- Event: 5000 metres

Werner Girke (born 4 September 1940) is a German long-distance runner. He competed in the men's 5000 metres at the 1968 Summer Olympics.
