= Nikolay Puklakov =

Russian long-distance runner

Personal information
- Born: 15 January 1945 Cheboksary, Soviet Union
- Died: 14 August 2009 (aged 64) Cheboksary, Russia

Sport
- Sport: Track and field
Medal record
Representing Soviet Union
Summer Universiade
Gold medal – first place	1970 Turin	5000m

Nikolay Puklakov (15 January 1945 – 14 August 2009) was a Russian long-distance runner who competed in the 1972 Summer Olympics.
