= Dennis Coates =

British middle-distance runner

Personal information
- Nationality: British (English)
- Born: 11 February 1953 (age 73) Sunderland, England
- Height: 175 cm (5 ft 9 in)
- Weight: 66 kg (146 lb)

Sport
- Sport: Middle-distance running
- Event: Steeplechase
- Club: Gateshead Harriers

Dennis Malcolm Coates (born 11 February 1953) is a male British retired middle-distance runner who competed at the 1976 Summer Olympics.

== Biography ==
Coates finished second behind Tony Staynings in the 3,000 metres steeplechase event at the 1975 AAA Championships. At the 1976 Olympics Games in Montreal, Coates represented Great Britain in the men's 3000 metres steeplechase.

Caotes twice became the British 3000 metres steeplechase champion after winning the British AAA Championships titles at the 1977 AAA Championships and the 1978 AAA Championships.

Coates represented England in the 3,000 metres steeplechase event, at the 1978 Commonwealth Games in Edmonton, Canada.
