= Jim Alder =

British distance runner (born 1940)

Jim Alder MBE
Personal information
- Born: 10 June 1940 (age 86) Glasgow, Scotland
- Height: 1.72 m (5 ft 8 in)
- Weight: 64 kg (141 lb)

Sport
- Sport: Long-distance running
- Club: Morpeth Harriers; Edinburgh AC

Achievements and titles
- Olympic finals: 1968
Medal record
Men's athletics
Representing Great Britain
European Championships
Bronze medal – third place	1969 Athens	Marathon
Representing Scotland
Commonwealth Games
Gold medal – first place	1966 Kingston	Marathon
Silver medal – second place	1970 Edinburgh	Marathon
Bronze medal – third place	1966 Kingston	6 miles

James Noel Carroll Alder MBE (born 10 June 1940) is a British former distance runner.

Alder, who was born in Glasgow, was a foster child. His mother died of tuberculosis and his father was killed on the last day of World War II. He moved to Morpeth, north of Newcastle, and became interested in running.

== Athletics career ==
Alder's athletic career saw him compete at the 1966 Commonwealth Games in Kingston winning Marathon Gold, (having missed the 1964 Summer Olympics due to a knee injury). He competed in the 1968 Summer Olympics in Mexico City, the 1969 European Athletics Championships in Athens and the 1970 Commonwealth Games in Edinburgh.

He set a new world record for 30,000 m of 1 h 34 min 01.8 s in 1964. In that race he also set world records for 20 miles (1 h 40 min 58.0 s) and 2 hours (37,994m). The IAAF did not recognise the latter two marks for world records, but they were accepted as United Kingdom national records. Alder finished second behind Ron Hill in the 10 miles event at the 1965 AAA Championships and became British marathon champion at the 1967 AAA Championships.

At the 1968 Olympic Games, in Mexico City, his height was recorded at 5 ft 8 in (172 cm) and his weight was 141 lb (64 kg).

By 1970 he was running for Edinburgh AC and ran the best marathon of his career in the 1970 Commonwealth Games in Edinburgh in 2 h 12 min 4 s. In September 1970, in London, he set a new record for 30,000 m of 1 h 31 min 30.4 s which still stands today.

He won The Great Northern Half Marathon, Belfast in 1971 promoted by County Antrim Harriers in a time of 1 h 5 min 5 s.(Athletics Weekly 22 May 1971)

He was featured in The Sunday Times, on 15 April 2007, which profiled his gold medal-winning run in the 1966 Commonwealth Games in Kingston, Jamaica. Later that year in October, Alder featured on the BBC One series Inside Sport and was interviewed by Ray Stubbs. In 2012, Alder was selected to carry the Olympic flame through Northumberland, for the 2012 Olympic Games in London.
