= Javier Álvarez (runner) =

Spanish long-distance runner

Medal record

Men's athletics

Representing Spain

European Indoor Championships
Bronze medal – third place	1970 Vienna	3000 m

Javier Álvarez Salgado (born 18 December 1943) is a Spanish former long-distance runner, born in Vigo, who competed in the 1968 Summer Olympics and in the 1972 Summer Olympics.
