= José Luis Ruiz =

Spanish long-distance runner (born 1952)

Personal information
- Full name: José Luis Ruiz Bernal
- Nationality: Spanish
- Born: 9 May 1952 (age 74)

Sport
- Sport: Long-distance running
- Event: 10,000 metres

José Luis Ruiz Bernal (born 9 May 1952) is a Spanish long-distance runner. He competed in the men's 10,000 metres at the 1976 Summer Olympics.
