= Pekka Päivärinta =

Finnish athlete (born 1949)

Medal record

Men's athletics

Representing Finland

World Cross Country Championships
Gold medal – first place	1973 Waregem	Senior race

European Indoor Championships
Silver medal – second place	1975 Katowice	3 000 meters
Silver medal – second place	1977 San Sebastián	3 000 meters
Bronze medal – third place	1973 Rotterdam	3 000 meters

Pekka Johannes Päivärinta (born 4 May 1949 in Aura) is a Finnish former long-distance runner. He won men's senior race in the first World Championships of cross-country running in 1973. He competed in 1972 Olympics at 3000-meter steeplechase finishing 8th. In 1976 Olympics he competed in 5000 meters and finished 13th. In 1975, he broke world record in 25000 meters running by his result 1:14:16,8. The record was broken by Bill Rodgers in 1979.

Contrary to his fellow Finnish long-distance runner — and age mate — Lasse Virén, Päivärinta underachieved in the major outdoor international championships of his active running career. On the other hand, he defeated Virén several times in the local and national Finnish races. One apparent obstacle to his success in the major international championships was that he ran badly in hot and humid conditions. This would partly explain his nineteenth place at 10,000 metres and thirteenth place at 5,000 metres in the 1974 European Athletics Championships, and his dropping out of the 10,000-metre heats in the 1976 Montreal Summer Olympics.

== Personal bests ==
- 800 m
  - Outdoor 1:52.5 (Salo 23.7. 1978)
- 1 500 m
  - Outdoor 3:37.2 (Helsinki 28.6. 1973),
  - Indoor 3:52.3 (Turku 27.2. 1972)
- Mile
  - Outdoor 4:05.2 (Oulu 2.9. 1975)
- 2 000 m
  - Outdoor 5:11.0 (Laitila 2.8. 1974)
- 3 000 m
  - Outdoor 7:57.2 (Hyvinkää 27.7. 1975),
  - Indoor 7:52.97 (Rotterdam 11.3. 1973)
- 5 000 m
  - Outdoor 13:28.51 (Helsinki 16.9. 1973),
  - Indoor 13:49.0 (Turku 22.2. 1975)
- 10 000 m
  - Outdoor 27:54.43 (Helsinki 23.6. 1976)
- 25 000 m
  - Outdoor 1:14:16.8 (WR) (Oulu 15.5. 1975)
- Marathon
  - 2:13:09.0 (Fukuoka 8.12. 1974)
- 2 000 m steeplechase
  - 5:46.8 (Mariehamn 9.8. 1969)
- 3 000 m steeplechase
  - 8:25.4 (Helsinki 26.7. 1972)
