= Fernando Cerrada =

Spanish long-distance runner

Fernando Cerrada (born 21 August 1954) is a Spanish former long-distance runner who competed in the 1976 Summer Olympics. He was a gold medalist at the 1973 European Junior Championships over 5000 metres.
