= Franco Fava =

Italian long-distance runner

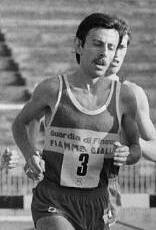
- Fava in 1977

Personal information
- Born: 3 September 1952 (age 73) Roccasecca, Italy
- Height: 1.72 m (5 ft 7 1/2 in)
- Weight: 56 kg (123 lb)

Sport
- Country: Italy
- Sport: Athletics
- Event: Middle distance running
- Club: G.S. Fiamme Gialle

Achievements and titles
- Personal bests: 3000 m st: 8:18.85 (1974); 5000 m: 13:21.86 (1977); 10000 m: 27:42.65 (1977); 20000 m: 58:43.8 (1977); Marathon: 2:12:54 (1976)
Medal record
Summer Universiade
Gold medal – first place	1975 Rome	5000m
Gold medal – first place	1975 Rome	10,000m
Silver medal – second place	1977 Sofia	10,000m
Mediterranean Games
Bronze medal – third place	1975 Algiers	3000 m steeplechase

Franco Fava (born 3 September 1952) is an Italian former long-distance runner.

== Biography ==
Franco Fava participated at two editions of the Summer Olympics (1972, 1976), he has 29 caps in national team from 1968 to 1977.

After his sporting career Fava became a journalist and currently writes for the Corriere dello Sport.

== Achievements ==
Year	Competition	Venue	Position	Event	Performance	Note
1972	Olympic Games	(West Germany) Munich	Heat	3000 metres steeplechase	8:35.0	
1976	Olympic Games	(Canada) Montreal	Heat	10000 metres	28:24.80	
1976	Olympic Games	(Canada) Montreal	8th	Marathon	2:14:24	

== National titles ==
Franco Fava has won 13 times the individual national championship.

- 4 wins in 3000 metres steeplechase (1972, 1973, 1974, 1975)
- 2 wins in 3000 metres indoor (1974, 1979)
- 1 win in Half marathon (1976)
- 5 wins in Cross country running (1974, 1975, 1976, 1977, 1978)
