= 1977 IAAF World Cross Country Championships – Senior women's race =

Senior women's race at the 1977 IAAF World Cross Country Championships
- Organisers: IAAF
- Edition: 5th
- Date: March 20
- Host city: Düsseldorf, Nordrhein-Westfalen, West Germany
- Venue: Galopprennbahn Düsseldorf-Grafenberg
- Events: 1
- Distances: 5.1 km – Senior women
- Participation: 96 athletes from 17 nations

The Senior women's race at the 1977 IAAF World Cross Country Championships was held in Düsseldorf, West Germany, at the Galopprennbahn Düsseldorf-Grafenberg on March 20, 1977. A report on the event was given in the Glasgow Herald.

Complete results, medallists, and the results of British athletes were published.

== Race results ==
=== Senior women's race (5.1 km) ===
==== Individual ====
Rank	Athlete	Country	Time
1st place, gold medalist(s)	Carmen Valero	Spain	17:26
2nd place, silver medalist(s)	Lyudmila Bragina	Soviet Union	17:28
3rd place, bronze medalist(s)	Giana Romanova	Soviet Union	17:35
4	Irina Bondarchuk	Soviet Union	17:38
5	Cristina Tomasini	Italy	17:44
6	Raisa Katyukova	Soviet Union	17:46
7	Ann Yeoman	England	17:47
8	Sue Kinsey	United States	17:49
9	Anne Audain	New Zealand	18:00
10	Cornelia Bürki	Switzerland	18:02
11	Kathy Mills	United States	18:03
12	Lyubov Ivanova	Soviet Union	18:05
13	Heather Thomson	New Zealand	18:06
14	Julie Brown	United States	18:07
15	Peggy Neppel	United States	18:08
16	Joëlle De Brouwer	France	18:16
17	Annie van Stiphout	Netherlands	18:18
18	Vera Kemper	West Germany	18:20
19	Sinikka Tyynelä	Finland	18:22
20	Ewa Kuty	Poland	18:23
21	Thelma Wright	Canada	18:25
22	Bronislawa Ludwichowska	Poland	18:27
23	Montserrat Abello	Spain	18:28
24	Barbara Moore	New Zealand	18:29
25	Raisa Sadreydinova	Soviet Union	18:30
26	Carla Beurskens	Netherlands	18:31
27	Renata Pentlinowska	Poland	18:32
28	Charlotte Teske	West Germany	18:34
29	Donna Valaitis	Canada	18:35
30	Irene Miller	New Zealand	18:36
31	Chantal Navarro	France	18:37
32	Celina Sokolowska	Poland	18:39
33	Jane Colebrook	England	18:40
34	Glynis Penny	England	18:42
35	Derna Casetti	Italy	18:44
36	Elsbeth Liebi	Switzerland	18:45
37	Irja Paukkonnen	Finland	18:46
38	Elina Pulkkinen	Finland	18:47
39	Monika Greschner	West Germany	18:49
40	Veronica Duffy	Ireland	18:50
41	Renate Kieninger	West Germany	18:51
42	Marjukka Ahtiainen	Finland	18:52
43	Maureen Crowley	Canada	18:53
44	Kath Binns	England	18:54
45	Encarnación Escudero	Spain	18:55
46	Sally Beach	Canada	18:56
47	Nadine Claes	Belgium	18:57
48	Doris Heritage	United States	18:58
49	Päivi Roppo	Finland	18:59
50	Sheelagh Morrissey	Ireland	19:00
51	Carol Gould	England	19:01
52	Margaret Coomber	Scotland	19:02
53	Geertje Meersseman	Belgium	19:03
54	Eryn Forbes	United States	19:04
55	Silvia Terenghi	Italy	19:06
56	Kathy Prosser	Canada	19:07
57	Joke van Gerven	Netherlands	19:10
58	Kathy d'Arcy	Canada	19:12
59	Pilar Fernandez	Spain	19:14
60	Viviane Gorau	France	19:15
61	Christine Haskett	Scotland	19:17
62	Monika Gaisjier	Poland	19:18
63	Francine Peeters	Belgium	19:20
64	Barbara Will	West Germany	19:22
65	Judith Shepherd	Scotland	19:24
66	Françoise Nicolas	France	19:25
67	Marina Loddo	Italy	19:26
68	Martine Bouchonneau	France	19:27
69	Silvia Binggeli	Switzerland	19:28
70	Lenie van der Poel	Netherlands	19:29
71	Marijke Moser	Switzerland	19:30
72	Cherry Hanson	England	19:32
73	Aila Virkberg	Finland	19:34
74	Alice Fischer	Switzerland	19:37
75	Marian Stanton	Ireland	19:40
76	Viviane van Emelen	Belgium	19:41
77	Amelia Lorza Lopez	Spain	19:42
78	Ann Disley	Wales	19:43
79	Allison Deed	New Zealand	19:44
80	Tineke Kluft	Netherlands	19:45
81	Claire Spauwen	Netherlands	19:46
82	Angelika Kullmann	West Germany	19:47
83	Rita Thijs	Belgium	19:53
84	Christine Seeman	France	19:54
85	Elaine Kelly	Ireland	20:00
86	Gillian Hutcheson	Scotland	20:05
87	Angeles Guitart Martinez	Spain	20:15
88	Shirley Somervell	New Zealand	20:16
89	Rubina Young	Scotland	20:16
90	Jean Lochhead	Wales	20:23
91	Kate Davis	Ireland	20:35
92	Janet Higgins	Scotland	20:38
93	Bronwen Smith	Wales	20:51
94	Emily Dowling	Ireland	20:58
95	Debbie Lewis	Wales	21:22
96	Lynne Huntbach	Wales	21:40

==== Teams ====
Rank	Team	Points
1st place, gold medalist(s)	Soviet Union: Lyudmila Bragina / 2; Giana Romanova / 3; Irina Bondarchuk / 4; Raisa Katyukova / 6; (Lyubov Ivanova) / (12); (Raisa Sadreydinova) / (25)	15
2nd place, silver medalist(s)	United States: Sue Kinsey / 8; Kathy Mills / 11; Julie Brown / 14; Peggy Neppel / 15; (Doris Heritage) / (48); (Eryn Forbes) / (54)	48
3rd place, bronze medalist(s)	New Zealand: Anne Audain / 9; Heather Thomson / 13; Barbara Moore / 24; Irene Miller / 30; (Allison Deed) / (79); (Shirley Somervell) / (88)	76
4	Poland: Ewa Kuty / 20; Bronislawa Ludwichowska / 22; Renata Pentlinowska / 27; Celina Sokolowska / 32; (Monika Gaisjier) / (62)	101
5	England: Ann Yeoman / 7; Jane Colebrook / 33; Glynis Penny / 34; Kath Binns / 44; (Carol Gould) / (51); (Cherry Hanson) / (72)	118
6	West Germany: Vera Kemper / 18; Charlotte Teske / 28; Monika Greschner / 39; Renate Kieninger / 41; (Barbara Will) / (64); (Angelika Kullmann) / (82)	126
7	Spain: Carmen Valero / 1; Montserrat Abello / 23; Encarnación Escudero / 45; Pilar Fernandez / 59; (Amelia Lorza Lopez) / (77); (Angeles Guitart Martinez) / (87)	128
8	Finland: Sinikka Tyynelä / 19; Irja Paukkonnen / 37; Elina Pulkkinen / 38; Marjukka Ahtiainen / 42; (Päivi Roppo) / (49); (Aila Virkberg) / (73)	136
9	Canada: Thelma Wright / 21; Donna Valaitis / 29; Maureen Crowley / 43; Sally Beach / 46; (Kathy Prosser) / (56); (Kathy d'Arcy) / (58)	139
10	Italy: Cristina Tomasini / 5; Derna Casetti / 35; Silvia Terenghi / 55; Marina Loddo / 67	162
11	Netherlands: Annie van Stiphout / 17; Carla Beurskens / 26; Joke van Gerven / 57; Lenie van der Poel / 70; (Tineke Kluft) / (80); (Claire Spauwen) / (81)	170
12	France: Joëlle De Brouwer / 16; Chantal Navarro / 31; Viviane Gorau / 60; Françoise Nicolas / 66; (Martine Bouchonneau) / (68); (Christine Seeman) / (84)	173
13	Switzerland: Cornelia Bürki / 10; Elsbeth Liebi / 36; Silvia Binggeli / 69; Marijke Moser / 71; (Alice Fischer) / (74)	186
14	Belgium: Nadine Claes / 47; Geertje Meersseman / 53; Francine Peeters / 63; Viviane van Emelen / 76; (Rita Thijs) / (83)	239
15	Ireland: Veronica Duffy / 40; Sheelagh Morrissey / 50; Marian Stanton / 75; Elaine Kelly / 85; (Kate Davis) / (91); (Emily Dowling) / (94)	250
16	Scotland: Margaret Coomber / 52; Christine Haskett / 61; Judith Shepherd / 65; Gillian Hutcheson / 86; (Rubina Young) / (89); (Janet Higgins) / (92)	264
17	Wales: Ann Disley / 78; Jean Lochhead / 90; Bronwen Smith / 93; Debbie Lewis / 95; (Lynne Huntbach) / (96)	356

- Note: Athletes in parentheses did not score for the team result

== Participation ==
An unofficial count yields the participation of 96 athletes from 17 countries in the Senior women's race, one athlete less than the official number published.

- Belgium (5)
- Canada (6)
- England (6)
- Finland (6)
- France (6)
- Ireland (6)
- Italy (4)
- Netherlands (6)
- New Zealand (6)
- Poland (5)
- Scotland (6)
- Soviet Union (6)
- Spain (6)
- Switzerland (5)
- United States (6)
- Wales (5)
- West Germany (6)

== See also ==
- 1977 IAAF World Cross Country Championships – Senior men's race
- 1977 IAAF World Cross Country Championships – Junior men's race
