= 1975 IAAF World Cross Country Championships – Senior women's race =

Senior women's race at the 1975 IAAF World Cross Country Championships
- Organisers: IAAF
- Edition: 3rd
- Date: March 16
- Host city: Rabat, Morocco
- Venue: Souissi Racecourse
- Events: 1
- Distances: 3.9 km – Senior women
- Participation: 71 athletes from 13 nations

The Senior women's race at the 1975 IAAF World Cross Country Championships was held in Rabat, Morocco, at the Souissi Racecourse on March 16, 1975.

== Race results ==
=== Senior women's race (3.9 km) ===
==== Individual ====
Rank	Athlete	Country	Time
1st place, gold medalist(s)	Julie Brown	United States	13:42
2nd place, silver medalist(s)	Bronislawa Ludwichowska	Poland	13:47
3rd place, bronze medalist(s)	Carmen Valero	Spain	13:48
4	Gabriella Dorio	Italy	13:51
5	Lorraine Moller	New Zealand	13:53
6	Heather Thomson	New Zealand	14:01
7	Ann Yeoman	England	14:03
8	Mary Stewart	Scotland	14:03
9	Margherita Gargano	Italy	14:12
10	Anne Garrett	New Zealand	14:15
11	Kate Keyes (Note: Incorrectly listed as her sister Maggie Keyes in some archives.)	United States	14:18
12	Magda Ilands	Belgium	14:19
13	Renata Pentlinowska	Poland	14:20
14	Nina Holmén	Finland	14:21
15	Peggy Neppel	United States	14:24
16	Joëlle De Brouwer	France	14:25
17	Doris Brown	United States	14:25
18	Christine Tranter	England	14:26
19	Penny Yule	England	14:27
20	Carol Gould	England	14:29
21	Maria Paz de Lucas	Spain	14:30
22	Celina Magala	Poland	
23	Christine Haskett	Scotland	
24	Zofia Kolakowska	Poland	
25	Viviane van Emelen	Belgium	
26	Joëlle Audibert	France	
27	Cindy Poor	United States	
28	Marleen Mols	Belgium	
29	Allison Deed	New Zealand	
30	Brigitte de Palmenaere	Belgium	
31	Sinikka Tyynelä	Finland	
32	Glynis Goodburn	England	
33	Irja Pettinen	Finland	
34	Thelwyn Bateman	Wales	
35	Encarnación Escudero	Spain	
36	Montserrat Abelló	Spain	
37	Danuta Siemieniuk	Poland	
38	Urszula Prasek	Poland	
39	Marjukka Ahtiainen	Finland	
40	Catherine Bultez	France	
41	Silvia Terenghi	Italy	
42	Margaret Coomber	Scotland	
43	Martine Rouze	France	
44	Lynne Tennant	Australia	15:08
45	Elizabeth Richards	Australia	15:09
46	Belen Azpeitia	Spain	
47	Maureen Moyle	Australia	15:18
48	Linda Heinmiller	United States	
49	Sonja Castelein	Belgium	
50	Chantal Navarro	France	
51	Dianne Zorn	New Zealand	
52	Angela Ramello	Italy	
53	Lavinia Petrie	Australia	15:26
54	Elaine Guittard	France	
55	Bruna Lovisolo	Italy	
56	Ann Barrass	Scotland	
57	Jean Lochhead	Wales	
58	Hassania Darami	Morocco	
59	Bernadette van Roy	Belgium	
60	Hadhoum Kadiri	Morocco	
61	Marjatta Kallio	Finland	
62	Marcelina Hernaiz	Spain	
63	Bronwen Smith	Wales	
64	Allison Brown	Scotland	
65	Anne Morris	Wales	
66	Ann Roblin	Wales	
67	Palm Gunstone	Scotland	
68	Khadiya Bouchal	Morocco	
69	Halina Ennay	Morocco	
70	Anna James	Wales	
71	Khadiya Toumi	Morocco	

==== Teams ====
Rank	Team	Points
1st place, gold medalist(s)	United States: Julie Brown / 1; Kate Keyes / 11; Peggy Neppel / 15; Doris Brown / 17; (Cindy Poor) / (27); (Linda Heinmiller) / (48)	44
2nd place, silver medalist(s)	New Zealand: Lorraine Moller / 5; Heather Thomson / 6; Anne Garrett / 10; Allison Deed / 29; (Dianne Zorn) / (51)	50
3rd place, bronze medalist(s)	Poland: Bronislawa Ludwichowska / 2; Renata Pentlinowska / 13; Celina Magala / 22; Zofia Kolakowska / 24; (Danuta Siemieniuk) / (37); (Urszula Prasek) / (38)	61
4	England: Ann Yeoman / 7; Christine Tranter / 18; Penny Yule / 19; Carol Gould / 20; (Glynis Goodburn) / (32)	64
5	Belgium: Magda Ilands / 12; Viviane van Emelen / 25; Marleen Mols / 28; Brigitte de Palmenaere / 30; (Sonja Castelein) / (49); (Bernadette van Roy) / (59)	95
6	Spain: Carmen Valero / 3; Maria Paz de Lucas / 21; Encarnación Escudero / 35; Montserrat Abello / 36; (Belen Azpeitia) / (46); (Marcelina Hernaiz) / (62)	95
7	Italy: Gabriella Dorio / 4; Margherita Gargano / 9; Silvia Terenghi / 41; Angela Ramello / 52; (Bruna Lovisolo) / (55)	106
8	Finland: Nina Holmén / 14; Sinikka Tyynelä / 31; Irja Pettinen / 33; Marjukka Ahtiainen / 39; (Marjatta Kallio) / (61)	117
9	France: Joëlle De Brouwer / 16; Joëlle Audibert / 26; Catherine Bultez / 40; Martine Rouze / 43; (Chantal Navarro) / (50); (Elaine Guittard) / (54)	125
10	Scotland: Mary Stewart / 8; Christine Haskett / 23; Margaret Coomber / 42; Ann Barrass / 56; (Allison Brown) / (64); (Palm Gunstone) / (67)	129
11	Australia: Lynne Tennant / 44; Elizabeth Richards / 45; Maureen Moyle / 47; Lavinia Petrie / 53	189
12	Wales: Thelwyn Bateman / 34; Jean Lochhead / 57; Bronwen Smith / 63; Anne Morris / 65; (Ann Roblin) / (66); (Anna James) / (70)	219
13	Morocco: Hassania Darami / 58; Hadhoum Kadiri / 60; Khadiya Bouchal / 68; Halina Ennay / 69; (Khadiya Toumi) / (71)	255

- Note: Athletes in parentheses did not score for the team result

== Participation ==
An unofficial count yields the participation of 71 athletes from 13 countries in the Senior women's race. This is in agreement with the official numbers as published.

- Australia (4)
- Belgium (6)
- England (5)
- Finland (5)
- France (6)
- Italy (5)
- Morocco (5)
- New Zealand (5)
- Poland (6)
- Scotland (6)
- Spain (6)
- United States (6)
- Wales (6)

== See also ==
- 1975 IAAF World Cross Country Championships – Senior men's race
- 1975 IAAF World Cross Country Championships – Junior men's race
