= 1981 USA Outdoor Track and Field Championships =

Sports event in Sacramento, California

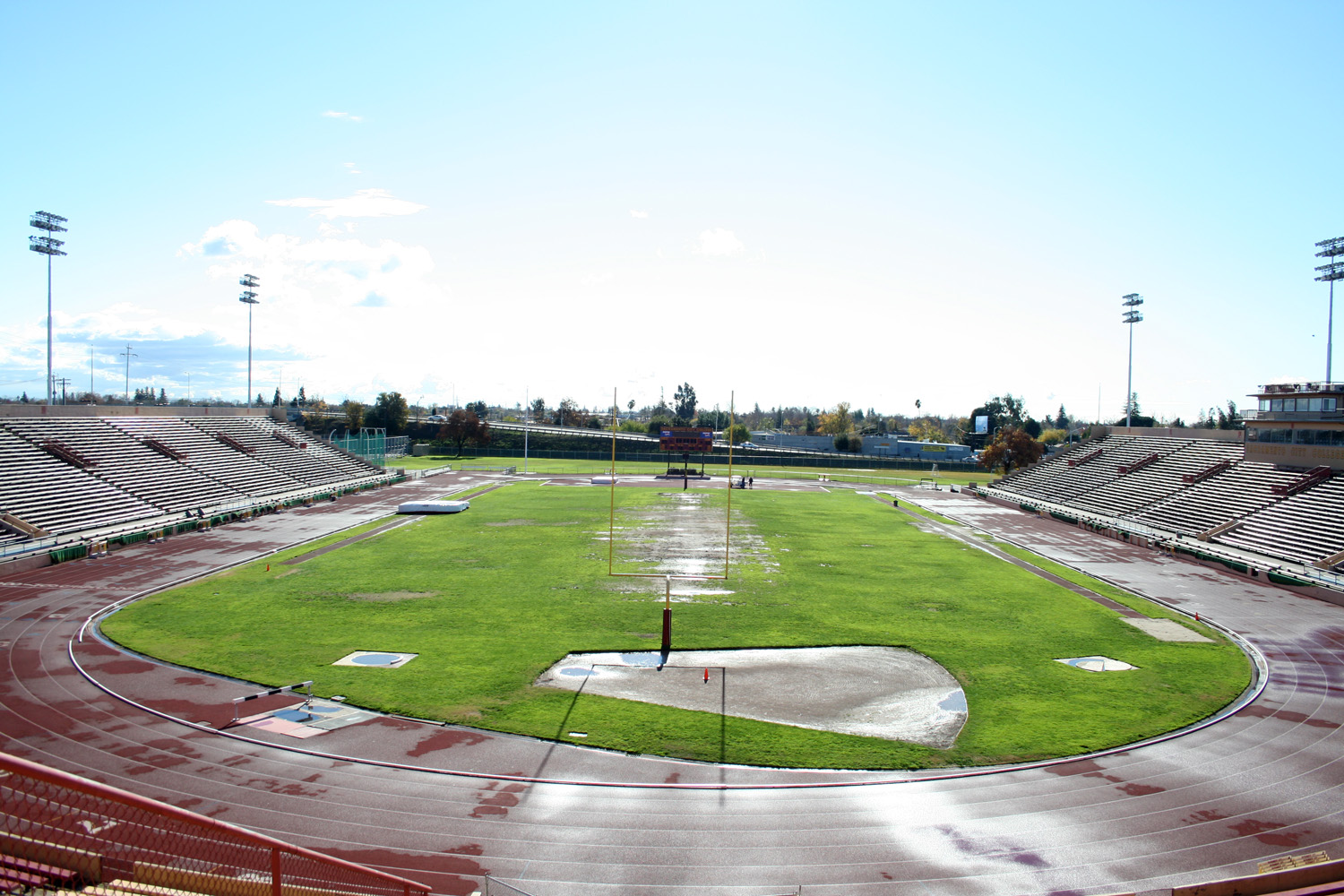
- Dates: June 20–21
- Host city: Sacramento, California, United States
- Venue: Hughes Stadium; Sacramento City College

The 1981 USA Outdoor Track and Field Championships took place between June 20–21 at Hughes Stadium on the campus of Sacramento City College in Sacramento, California. The 20K racewalk was held May 3 in Kenosha, Wisconsin. The decathlon was held at the University of California, Santa Barbara on June 27-8. The meet was organized by The Athletics Congress.

In addition to being the National Championship, it was the selection meet to international teams including the 1981 IAAF World Cup.

This meet was headlined by Carl Lewis, who would dominate the headlines in the sport for the next decade and a half.

== Results ==
=== Men track events ===
Event	Gold		Silver		Bronze	
100 meters	Carl Lewis	10.13	Stanley Floyd	10.21	Mel Lattany	10.21
200 meters	Jeff Phillips	20.36	Eric Brown	20.38	James Sanford	20.53
400 meters	Cliff Wiley	44.70 CR	Tony Darden	45.01	Willie Smith	45.15
800 meters	James Robinson	1.45.53	Michael Boit Kenya; Randy Wilson	1.45.60; 1.45.82	David Mack	1.46.03
1500 meters	Sydney Maree; South Africa; Steve Scott	3.35.02 CR 3.35.51	Todd Harbour	3.36.94	Jim Spivey	3.37.24
5000 meters	Matt Centrowitz	13.28.86 CR	Craig Virgin	13.31.64	Don Clary	13.33.54
10000 meters	Alberto Salazar	28.39.33	Duncan MacDonald	28.45.59	Charles Spedding; United Kingdom; Mark Nenow	28.49.85 29.04.5
5 miles walk	Ray Sharp	30:47.2				
20 KM Race Walk (May 6 Kenosha, WI)	Jim Heiring	1.30.47	Dan O'Connor	1.32.20	Marco Evoniuk	1.34.25
Marathon (42.195 km.)	Robert Johnson	2.29.14.0	James Driver	2.39.57.5	Frank Meares	2.41.23.8
110 meters hurdles	Greg Foster	13.39	Larry Cowling	13.66	Tonie Campbell	13.66
400 meters hurdles	Edwin Moses	47.59	Andre Phillips	48.10	David Lee	48.53
3000 meters steeplechase	Henry Marsh	8.30.7	Amos Korir Kenya; Solomon Chebor Kenya; John Gregorek	8.31.5; 8.31.9; 8.32.5	Ken Martin	8.34.3

=== Men field events ===
Event	Gold		Silver		Bronze	
High jump	Tyke Peacock	2.25 m (7 ft 4 1/2 in)	Milton Goode	2.25 m (7 ft 4 1/2 in)	Nat Page	2.25 m (7 ft 4 1/2 in)
Pole vault	Billy Olson	5.55 m (18 ft 2 1/2 in)	Steve Smith	5.45 m (17 ft 10 1/2 in)	Brad Pursley	5.34 m (17 ft 6 in)
Long jump	Carl Lewis	8.62 m (28 ft 3 1/4 in) CR	Larry Myricks	8.45 m (27 ft 8 1/2 in)	Mike McRae	8.04 m (26 ft 4 1/2 in)
Triple jump	Willie Banks	17.56 m (57 ft 7 1/4 in) AR, CR	Mike Marlow	17.17 m (56 ft 3 3/4 in)	Robert Cannon	17.04 m (55 ft 10 3/4 in)
Shot put	Dave Laut	21.60 m (70 ft 10 1/4 in)	Michael Carter	21.20 m (69 ft 6 1/2 in)	Brian Oldfield	21.18 m (69 ft 5 3/4 in)
Discus throw	Ben Plucknett	69.01 m (226 ft 4 in)	Luis Mariano Delis; Cuba; David Voorhees	65.53 m (214 ft 11 in) 65.40 m (214 ft 6 in)	John Powell	64.67 m (212 ft 2 in)
Hammer throw	Richard Olsen; Norway; Dave McKenzie	71.88 m (235 ft 9 in) 71.07 m (233 ft 2 in)	Matt Mileham; United Kingdom; Andy Bessette	70.43 m (231 ft 0 in) 69.90 m (229 ft 3 in)	Peter Farmer; Australia; John McArdle	69.47 m (227 ft 11 in) 66.93 m (219 ft 7 in)
Javelin throw	Bruce Kennedy	84.33 m (276 ft 8 in)	Rod Ewaliko	83.01 m (272 ft 4 in)	Duncan Atwood	81.53 m (267 ft 5 in)
Decathlon	John Crist	8005	Tony Allen-Cooksey	7972	Jim Howell	7787

=== Women track events ===
Event	Gold		Silver		Bronze	
100 meters	Evelyn Ashford	11.07	Jeanette Bolden	11.27	Alice Brown	11.28
200 meters	Evelyn Ashford	22.30	Florence Griffith	23.09	Jacqueline Pusey; Jamaica; Chandra Cheeseborough	23.14 23.17
400 meters	Denean Howard	51.79	Rosalyn Bryant	52.53	Lorna Forde; Barbados; Arlise Emerson	52.87 53.37
800 meters	Madeline Manning	1.58.50	Leann Warren	2.00.08	Robin Campbell	2.01.02
1500 meters	Janice Merrill	4.14.62	Cindy Bremser	4.15.34	Kate Keyes	4.15.84
3000 meters	Brenda Webb	9.04.54	Joan Hansen	9.07.57	Carol Urish	9.19.50
10000 meters	Joan Benoit	33.37.5	Patsy Sharples; South Africa; Julie Shea	34.10.2 34.30.6	Glynis Quick; New Zealand; Kim Schnurpfeil	34.34.8 34.39.3
Marathon Ottawa, Canada	Nancy Conz	2.36.45.9	Joan Benoit	2.37.25	Julie Isphording	2.38.25.9
100 meters hurdles	Stephanie Hightower	13.09	Benita Fitzgerald	13.10	Jackie Washington	13.18
400 meters hurdles	Sandy Myers	56.43	Tammy Etienne	57.14	Edna Brown	57.82
10,000 m walk	Sue Liers-Westerfield	49:54.2				

=== Women field events ===
Event	Gold		Silver		Bronze	
High jump	Pam Spencer	1.95 m (6 ft 4 3/4 in)	Louise Ritter	1.92 m (6 ft 3 1/2 in)	Colleen Reinstra	1.92 m (6 ft 3 1/2 in)
Long jump	Jodi Anderson	6.71 m (22 ft 0 in)	Kathy McMillan	6.59 m (21 ft 7 1/4 in)	Carol Lewis	6.54 m (21 ft 5 1/4 in)w
Shot put	Denise Wood	16.91 m (55 ft 5 1/2 in)	Lorna Griffin	16.26 m (53 ft 4 in)	Sandy Burke	15.99 m (52 ft 5 1/2 in)
Discus throw	Leslie Deniz	55.70 m (182 ft 8 in)	Denise Wood	55.40 m (181 ft 9 in)	Mariette van Heerden; South Africa; Lorna Griffin	54.79 m (179 ft 9 in) 54.68 m (179 ft 4 in)
Javelin throw	Karin Smith	63.45 m (208 ft 2 in)	Kathy Schmidt	60.78 m (199 ft 4 in)	Lynda Hughes	53.64 m (175 ft 11 in)
Heptathlon	Jane Frederick	6011w	Jackie Joyner	5827w	Patsy Walker	5704w

== See also ==
- United States Olympic Trials (track and field)
