= 1975 IAAF World Cross Country Championships =

- Organisers: IAAF
- Edition: 3rd
- Date: March 16
- Host city: Rabat, Morocco
- Venue: Souissi Racecourse
- Events: 3
- Distances: 12 km – Senior men 7 km – Junior men 4.2 km – Senior women
- Participation: 316 athletes from 26 nations

The 1975 IAAF World Cross Country Championships was held in Rabat, Morocco, at the Souissi Racecourse on March 16, 1975. A report on the event was given in the Glasgow Herald.

Complete results for men, junior men, women, medallists, and the results of British athletes were published.

== Medallists ==
| Event | Gold | | Silver | | Bronze | |
|---|---|---|---|---|---|---|
Individual
| Senior men (12 km) | Ian Stewart; Scotland | 35:20 | Mariano Haro; Spain | 35:21 | Bill Rodgers; United States | 35:27.4 |
| Junior men (7 km) | Bobby Thomas; United States | 20:59.8 | José Luis González; Spain | 21:18 | John Treacy; Ireland | 21:23 |
| Senior women (4.2 km) | Julie Brown; United States | 13:42 | Bronislawa Ludwichowska; Poland | 13:47 | Carmen Valero; Spain | 13:48 |
Team
| Senior men | New Zealand | 127 | England | 198 | Belgium | 211 |
| Junior men | United States | 29 | Ireland | 35 | Spain | 44 |
| Senior women | United States | 44 | New Zealand | 50 | Poland | 61 |

== Race results ==
=== Senior men's race (12 km) ===
Individual race
| Rank | Athlete | Country | Time |
|---|---|---|---|
| 1st place, gold medalist(s) | Ian Stewart | Scotland | 35:20 |
| 2nd place, silver medalist(s) | Mariano Haro | Spain | 35:21 |
| 3rd place, bronze medalist(s) | Bill Rodgers | United States | 35:27.4 |
| 4 | John Walker | New Zealand | 35:45 |
| 5 | Euan Robertson | New Zealand | 35:46 |
| 6 | Franco Fava | Italy | 35:47 |
| 7 | Ray Smedley | England | 35:50 |
| 8 | Klaus-Peter Hildenbrand | West Germany | 35:51 |
| 9 | Hans-Jürgen Orthmann | West Germany | 35:55 |
| 10 | Gaston Roelants | Belgium | 35:57 |
| 11 | Wilfried Scholz | East Germany | 35:58 |
| 12 | Abdelkader Zaddem | Tunisia | 36:00 |
Full results

Teams
| Rank | Team | Points |
|---|---|---|
| 1st place, gold medalist(s) | New Zealand: John Walker / 4; Euan Robertson / 5; David Sirl / 25; John Dixon / 26; John Sheddan / 33; Bryan Rose / 34; (Jack Foster) / (36); (Kevin Ryan) / (72); (Dick Quax) / (113) | 127 |
| 2nd place, silver medalist(s) | England: Ray Smedley / 7; Grenville Tuck / 14; Bernie Ford / 37; Tony Simmons / 39; Trevor Wright / 50; Alan Blinston / 51; (Mike Beevor) / (71); (Keith Angus) / (89) | 198 |
| 3rd place, bronze medalist(s) | Belgium: Gaston Roelants / 10; Emiel Puttemans / 16; André Ornelis / 21; Eddy Rombaux / 45; Marc Smet / 57; Erik Gijselinck / 62; (Albien Van Holsbeek) / (74); (Paul Thijs) / (134); (Eddy Van Mullem) / (DNF) | 211 |
| 4 | United States | 250 |
| 5 | East Germany | 274 |
| 6 | Scotland | 292 |
| 7 | Algeria | 301 |
| 8 | France | 303 |
Full results

- Note: Athletes in parentheses did not score for the team result

=== Junior men's race (7 km) ===
Individual race
| Rank | Athlete | Country | Time |
|---|---|---|---|
| 1st place, gold medalist(s) | Bobby Thomas | United States | 20:59.8 |
| 2nd place, silver medalist(s) | José Luis González | Spain | 21:18 |
| 3rd place, bronze medalist(s) | John Treacy | Ireland | 21:23 |
| 4 | Cándido Alario | Spain | 21:29 |
| 5 | Don Clary | United States | 21:38 |
| 6 | Mike Longthorn | England | 21:41 |
| 7 | Christian Foucquets | Belgium | 21:42 |
| 8 | Roy Kissin | United States | 21:44 |
| 9 | Louis Kenny | Ireland | 21:45 |
| 10 | Gerry Finnegan | Ireland | 21:46 |
| 11 | Jim Burns | Scotland | 21:47 |
| 12 | Nat Muir | Scotland | 21:51 |
Full results

Teams
| Rank | Team | Points |
|---|---|---|
| 1st place, gold medalist(s) | United States: Bobby Thomas / 1; Don Clary / 5; Roy Kissin / 8; Ralph Serna / 15 | 29 |
| 2nd place, silver medalist(s) | Ireland: John Treacy / 3; Louis Kenny / 9; Gerry Finnegan / 10; Gerry Redmond / 13; (Dick Hooper) / (28) | 35 |
| 3rd place, bronze medalist(s) | Spain: José Luis González / 2; Cándido Alario / 4; Vicente de la Parte / 18; Luis Adsuara / 20; (Manuel Perez) / (44); (Antonio Aparicio) / (49) | 44 |
| 4 | Belgium | 81 |
| 5 | Scotland | 95 |
| 6 | England | 99 |
| 7 | Algeria | 116 |
| 8 | France | 127 |
Full results

- Note: Athletes in parentheses did not score for the team result

=== Senior women's race (4.2 km) ===
Individual race
| Rank | Athlete | Country | Time |
|---|---|---|---|
| 1st place, gold medalist(s) | Julie Brown | United States | 13:42 |
| 2nd place, silver medalist(s) | Bronislawa Ludwichowska | Poland | 13:47 |
| 3rd place, bronze medalist(s) | Carmen Valero | Spain | 13:48 |
| 4 | Gabriella Dorio | Italy | 13:51 |
| 5 | Lorraine Moller | New Zealand | 13:53 |
| 6 | Heather Thomson | New Zealand | 14:01 |
| 7 | Ann Yeoman | England | 14:03 |
| 8 | Mary Stewart | Scotland | 14:03 |
| 9 | Margherita Gargano | Italy | 14:12 |
| 10 | Anne Garrett | New Zealand | 14:15 |
| 11 | Kate Keyes | United States | 14:18 |
| 12 | Magda Ilands | Belgium | 14:19 |
Full results

Teams
| Rank | Team | Points |
|---|---|---|
| 1st place, gold medalist(s) | United States: Julie Brown / 1; Kate Keyes / 11; Paula Neppel / 15; Doris Brown / 17; (Cindy Poor) / (27); (Linda Heinmiller) / (48) | 44 |
| 2nd place, silver medalist(s) | New Zealand: Lorraine Moller / 5; Heather Thomson / 6; Anne Garrett / 10; Allison Deed / 29; (Dianne Zorn) / (51) | 50 |
| 3rd place, bronze medalist(s) | Poland: Bronislawa Ludwichowska / 2; Renata Pentlinowska / 13; Celina Magala / 22; Zofia Kolakowska / 24; (Danuta Siemieniuk) / (37); (Urszula Prasek) / (38) | 61 |
| 4 | England | 64 |
| 5 | Belgium | 95 |
| 6 | Spain | 95 |
| 7 | Italy | 106 |
| 8 | Finland | 117 |
Full results

- Note: Athletes in parentheses did not score for the team result

== Medal table (unofficial) ==
| Rank | Nation | Gold | Silver | Bronze | Total |
|---|---|---|---|---|---|
| 1 | United States (USA) | 4 | 0 | 1 | 5 |
| 2 | New Zealand (NZL) | 1 | 1 | 0 | 2 |
| 3 | Scotland (SCO) | 1 | 0 | 0 | 1 |
| 4 | Spain (ESP) | 0 | 2 | 2 | 4 |
| 5 | Ireland (IRL) | 0 | 1 | 1 | 2 |
| 5 | Poland (POL) | 0 | 1 | 1 | 2 |
| 7 | England (ENG) | 0 | 1 | 0 | 1 |
| 8 | Belgium (BEL) | 0 | 0 | 1 | 1 |
| Totals (8 entries) | | 6 | 6 | 6 | 18 |

- Note: Totals include both individual and team medals, with medals in the team competition counting as one medal.

== Participation ==
An unofficial count yields the participation of 316 athletes from 26 countries.

- Algeria (14)
- Australia (12)
- Belgium (21)
- East Germany (6)
- Egypt (1)
- England (18)
- Finland (12)
- France (21)
- Gibraltar (6)
- Iran (7)
- Ireland (12)
- Italy (20)
- Libya (7)
- Morocco (19)
- New Zealand (14)
- Northern Ireland (7)
- Poland (6)
- Saudi Arabia (6)
- Scotland (21)
- Spain (21)
- Sudan (7)
- Syria (6)
- Tunisia (9)
- United States (18)
- Wales (13)
- West Germany (12)

== See also ==
- 1975 IAAF World Cross Country Championships – Senior men's race
- 1975 IAAF World Cross Country Championships – Junior men's race
- 1975 IAAF World Cross Country Championships – Senior women's race
- 1975 in athletics (track and field)
