= Renata Walendziak =

Polish long-distance runner

Medal record

Women's athletics

Representing Poland

World Cross Country Championships
| Bronze medal – third place | 1975 Rabat | Senior team |

Renata Walendziak (née Pentlinowska; born 18 January 1950) is a Polish female former long-distance runner who competed in track running, cross country running and the marathon. She was born in Grabowo Bobowskie in the north of the country.

Walendziak was a five-time competitor for Poland at the IAAF World Cross Country Championships, competing every year from 1974 to 1978. She placed in the top thirty women on all her appearances, with her best results being fifth individually in 1976 and a team bronze medal in 1975, helped on by individual silver medallist Bronisława Ludwichowska. Both she and Ludwichowska were winners at the high profile Cinque Mulini cross country, with Walendziak being the 1976 champion. She made one major international appearance on the track, coming tenth in the 5000 metres at the 1974 European Athletics Championships.

Her career in the marathon began in 1979, when she won the inaugural edition of the Warsaw Marathon. A second win followed at the Otwock Marathon. Her times continued to improve, with 2:48:42 hours for fourth at the 1982 Košice Peace Marathon, 2:44:07 hours for third at the Berlin Marathon in 1983, then 2:41:34 hours for 18th at the New York City Marathon one month later. She set a time of 2:40:49 at the Debno Marathon, being runner-up to Jarmila Urbanová. The Debno race was the venue for the Polish Marathon Championships in 1985 and 1986, which she won both times, with her second winning time of 2:32:30 hours being a career best.

Seventh place at the 1984 New York City Marathon was a high point internationally on the roads for Walendziak. She did not rank highly when selected for Poland on the roads, coming 60th at the 1983 IAAF World Women's Road Race Championships, failing to finish at the 1985 World Marathon Cup, and placing 23rd at the European Marathon Cup in both 1985 and 1988. In 1987 she won the Warsaw Marathon for the second time in her career (the time of 2:38:24 was her second fastest ever) and she was also 15th at the London Marathon that year. Her last recorded marathon was at the age of 44, when she ran 3:22:05 in Warsaw.

== International competitions ==
| Year | Competition | Venue | Position | Event | Notes |
|---|---|---|---|---|---|
| 1974 | IAAF World Cross Country Championships | Monza, Italy | 24th | Senior race | 13:33 |
| 1974 | IAAF World Cross Country Championships | Monza, Italy | 6th | Senior team | 98 pts |
| 1974 | European Championships | Rome, Italy | 10th | 3000 m | 9:22.8 |
| 1975 | IAAF World Cross Country Championships | Rabat, Morocco | 13th | Senior race | 14:20 |
| 1975 | IAAF World Cross Country Championships | Rabat, Morocco | 3rd | Senior team | 61 pts |
| 1976 | IAAF World Cross Country Championships | Chepstow, Wales | 5th | Senior race | 17:00 |
| 1976 | IAAF World Cross Country Championships | Chepstow, Wales | 5th | Senior team | 87 pts |
| 1977 | IAAF World Cross Country Championships | Düsseldorf, West Germany | 27th | Senior race | 18:32 |
| 1977 | IAAF World Cross Country Championships | Düsseldorf, West Germany | 4th | Senior team | 101 pts |
| 1978 | IAAF World Cross Country Championships | Glasgow, United Kingdom | 29th | Senior race | 17:58 |
| 1978 | IAAF World Cross Country Championships | Glasgow, United Kingdom | 5th | Senior team | 122 pts |
| 1983 | IAAF World Women's Road Race Championships | San Diego, United States | 60th | 10K | 37:40 |
| 1985 | World Marathon Cup | Hiroshima, Japan | — | Marathon | DNF |
| 1985 | European Marathon Cup | Rome, Italy | 23rd | Marathon | 2:45:22 |
| 1988 | European Marathon Cup | Huy, Belgium | 23rd | Marathon | 2:42:08 |
