= 1977 AIAW Outdoor Track and Field Championships =

U.S. women's athletics collegiate championship event

- Dates: May 19–21, 1977
- Host city: Los Angeles, California; University of California, Los Angeles
- Venue: Drake Stadium
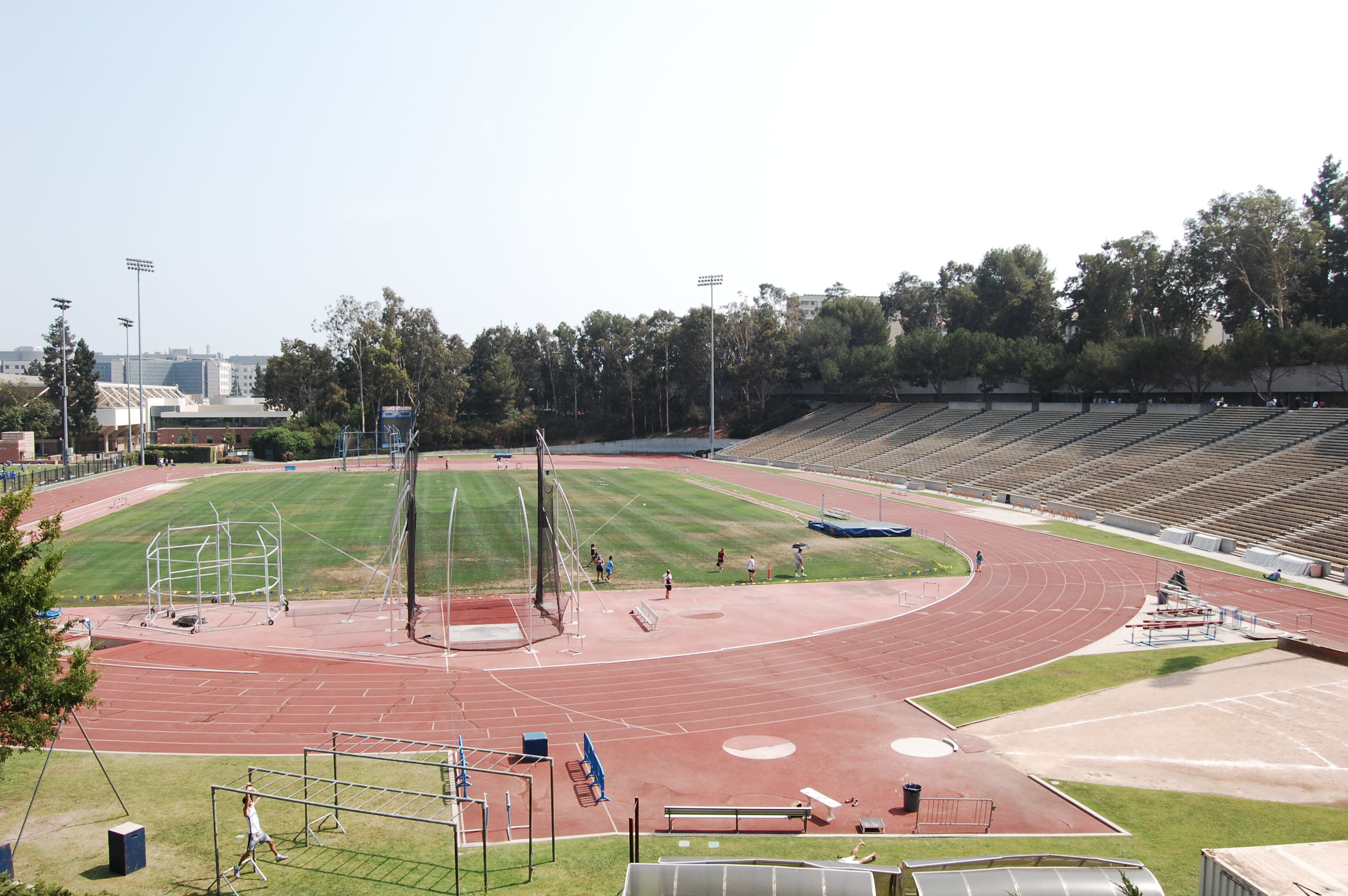

The 1977 AIAW Outdoor Track And Field Championships were the 9th annual Association for Intercollegiate Athletics for Women-sanctioned track meet to determine the individual and team national champions of women's collegiate track and field events in the United States. They were contested May 19−21, 1977 in Los Angeles, California by host University of California, Los Angeles. There were not separate AIAW Division I, II, and III championships for outdoor track and field until 1981.

The University of California, Los Angeles won the team title over California State University at Northridge. Runner Julie Brown scored 28 points for Cal State Northridge individually, in addition to running two relays for them. However, sprinter Evelyn Ashford was credited for UCLA's win. 3,256 spectators attended the final day of competition, and 149 schools participated.

== Team standings ==
- Scoring: 10 points for a 1st-place finish, 8 points for 2nd, 6 points for 3rd, 4 points for 4th, 2 points for 5th, and 1 point for 6th. Top 10 teams shown.

Rank	Team	Points
1st place, gold medalist(s)	UCLA Bruins	86
2nd place, silver medalist(s)	Cal State Northridge Matadors	73
3rd place, bronze medalist(s)	Iowa State Cyclones	41
4th	Tennessee Volunteers	40
5th	Prairie View A&M Lady Panthers	38
6th	Cal State Los Angeles Golden Eagles	30
7th	Seattle Pacific Falcons	24
8th	Arizona State Sun Devils	22
9th	Long Beach State Beach	17
10th	Texas Woman's Pioneers	16

== Results ==
- Only results of finals are shown

100 m
Pl.	Name	Team	Mark
1st place, gold medalist(s)	Evelyn Ashford	UCLA Bruins	11.32
2nd place, silver medalist(s)	Andrea Lynch	Long Beach State Beach	11.37
3rd place, bronze medalist(s)	Sheila Calmese	Kansas Jayhawks	11.75
4th	Debra Carter	Truman Bulldogs	11.77
5th	Carolyn McRoy	Maryland Terrapins	11.83
6th	Beverly Day	Prairie View A&M Lady Panthers	11.95
7th	Patty Van Wolvelaere	USC Trojans	12.00
	Janet Brown	Texas Woman's Pioneers	DNS

200 m
Pl.	Name	Team	Mark
1st place, gold medalist(s)	Evelyn Ashford	UCLA Bruins	23.0
2nd place, silver medalist(s)	Andrea Lynch	Long Beach State Beach	23.1
3rd place, bronze medalist(s)	Renaye Bowen	Arizona State Sun Devils	23.9
4th	Marie Nickson	Cal State East Bay Pioneers	24.1
5th	Carolyn McRoy	Maryland Terrapins	24.2
6th	Sheila Calmese	Kansas Jayhawks	24.5
7th	Beverly Day	Prairie View A&M Lady Panthers	NT
8th	Janet Brown	Texas Woman's Pioneers	NT

400 m
Pl.	Name	Team	Mark
1st place, gold medalist(s)	Rosalyn Bryant	Cal State Los Angeles Golden Eagles	51.79
2nd place, silver medalist(s)	Lorna Forde	LIU Brooklyn Blackbirds	52.13
3rd place, bronze medalist(s)	Kathy Weston	UCLA Bruins	53.07
4th	Mary Harvey	Stephen F. Austin Ladyjacks	54.16
5th	Avis Mailey	Arizona State Sun Devils	54.20
6th	Paulette Clagon	Morgan State Lady Bears	54.55
7th	Sharon Preston	Prairie View A&M Lady Panthers	54.98
8th	Ruth Obeng	Utah State Aggies	55.00
9th	Gerry Dammer	Texas State Bobcats	55.12

800 m
Pl.	Name	Team	Mark
1st place, gold medalist(s)	Julie Brown	Cal State Northridge Matadors	2:02.9
2nd place, silver medalist(s)	Wendy Knudson	Colorado State Rams	2:04.5
3rd place, bronze medalist(s)	Sue Latter	Michigan State Spartans	2:05.8
4th	Debbie Vetter	Iowa State Cyclones	2:05.8
5th	Debbie Roberson	UCLA Bruins	2:07.5
6th	Judy McLaughlin	Otterbein Cardinals	2:08.2
7th	Essie Kelley	Prairie View A&M Lady Panthers	2:08.3
8th	Cindy Worcester	Kansas State Wildcats	2:09.1
9th	Ellen Schmidt	Oregon Ducks	2:10.2

1500 m (Note: Places 8 and 9 not listed by Track & Field News)
Pl.	Name	Team	Mark
1st place, gold medalist(s)	Doreen Ennis	Montclair State Red Hawks	4:15.6
2nd place, silver medalist(s)	Debbie Vetter	Iowa State Cyclones	4:15.8
3rd place, bronze medalist(s)	Debbie Pearson Mitchell	UTEP Miners	4:16.1
4th	Julie Brown	Cal State Northridge Matadors	4:18.1
5th	Kate Keyes	UCLA Bruins	4:21.0
6th	Katy Schilly	Iowa State Cyclones	4:23.0
7th	Debbie Roth	Oregon Ducks	4:26.1
9th	Maggie Keyes	Cal Poly Mustangs	
10th	Wendy Knudson	Colorado State Rams	NT

3000 m
Pl.	Name	Team	Mark
1st place, gold medalist(s)	Julie Brown	Cal State Northridge Matadors	9:26.5
2nd place, silver medalist(s)	Lynn Lashley	Tennessee Volunteers	9:27.4
3rd place, bronze medalist(s)	Sue Kinsey	Cal State Northridge Matadors	9:30.0
4th	Marybeth Spencer	Wisconsin Badgers	9:30.4
5th	Kris Bankes	Penn State Nittany Lions	9:35.2
6th	Debbie Quatier	Seattle Pacific Falcons	9:45.5
7th	Linda Broderick	UCLA Bruins	9:48.1
8th	Katy Schilly	Iowa State Cyclones	9:51.3
9th	Lil Warnes	Michigan State Spartans	9:55.8
10th	Joyce Urish	Kansas State Wildcats	10:01.5

5000 m
Pl.	Name	Team	Mark
1st place, gold medalist(s)	Brenda Webb	Tennessee Volunteers	16:13.9
2nd place, silver medalist(s)	Sue Kinsey	Cal State Northridge Matadors	16:17.5
3rd place, bronze medalist(s)	Marybeth Spencer	Wisconsin Badgers	16:23.3
4th	Julie Brown	Cal State Northridge Matadors	16:26.9
5th	Lynn Lashley	Tennessee Volunteers	16:38.7
6th	Chris Troffer	Cal State Northridge Matadors	17:06.8
7th	Bridget Seip	Iowa State Cyclones	17:07.7
8th	Cynthia Wadsworth	Michigan State Spartans	17:14.9

100 m hurdles
Pl.	Name	Team	Mark
1st place, gold medalist(s)	Patty Van Wolvelaere	USC Trojans	13.18
2nd place, silver medalist(s)	Modupe Oshikoya	UCLA Bruins	13.37
3rd place, bronze medalist(s)	Debbie Esser	Iowa State Cyclones	14.06
4th	Pam Baker	Nebraska Cornhuskers	14.14
5th	Sherry Ballew	Kentucky Wildcats	14.23
6th	LaVonne Neal	La Salle Explorers	14.24
7th	Stephanie Hightower	Ohio State Buckeyes	14.27
8th	Mary Ayers	Prairie View A&M Lady Panthers	NT

400 m hurdles
Pl.	Name	Team	Mark
1st place, gold medalist(s)	Debbie Esser	Iowa State Cyclones	57.07 NR
2nd place, silver medalist(s)	Mary Ayers	Prairie View A&M Lady Panthers	57.17
3rd place, bronze medalist(s)	Sandra Levinski	Texas Woman's Pioneers	58.6
4th	Arthurene Gainer	Prairie View A&M Lady Panthers	59.55
5th	Jodi Anderson	Cal State Northridge Matadors	1:00.26
6th	Marilyn Carlson	Central Missouri Jennies	1:00.50
7th	Debra Melrose	Prairie View A&M Lady Panthers	1:01.33
8th	Clydine Crowder	UCLA Bruins	1:01.45
9th	Susan White	Maryland Terrapins	1:03.03

4 × 110 yards relay
Pl.	Name	Team	Mark
1st place, gold medalist(s)	Debra Melrose	Prairie View A&M Lady Panthers	45.95
1st place, gold medalist(s)	Mary Ayers	Prairie View A&M Lady Panthers	45.95
1st place, gold medalist(s)	Patricia Jackson	Prairie View A&M Lady Panthers	45.95
1st place, gold medalist(s)	Beverly Day	Prairie View A&M Lady Panthers	45.95
2nd place, silver medalist(s)		UNLV Rebels	46.59
3rd place, bronze medalist(s)		Cal State Los Angeles Golden Eagles	46.79
4th		Jackson State Lady Tigers	46.82
5th		Tennessee Volunteers	47.04
6th	Rosetta Birt	USC Trojans	47.15
6th	Jackie Gordon	USC Trojans	47.15
6th	Anna Biller	USC Trojans	47.15
6th	Patty Van Wolvelaere	USC Trojans	47.15
7th		Oregon Ducks	47.60
8th		Arizona State Sun Devils	50.64
		Texas Woman's Pioneers	DQ (Note: Originally 48.27 seconds for 8th)

4 × 440 yards relay
Pl.	Name	Team	Mark
1st place, gold medalist(s)	Mary Ayers	Prairie View A&M Lady Panthers	3:36.7
1st place, gold medalist(s)	Arthurene Gainer	Prairie View A&M Lady Panthers	3:36.7
1st place, gold medalist(s)	Beverly Day	Prairie View A&M Lady Panthers	3:36.7
1st place, gold medalist(s)	Essie Kelley	Prairie View A&M Lady Panthers	3:36.7
2nd place, silver medalist(s)	Evelyn Ashford	UCLA Bruins	3:40.1
2nd place, silver medalist(s)	Modupe Oshikoya	UCLA Bruins	3:40.1
2nd place, silver medalist(s)	Veronica Venezia	UCLA Bruins	3:40.1
2nd place, silver medalist(s)	Kathy Weston	UCLA Bruins	3:40.1
3rd place, bronze medalist(s)		Cal State Los Angeles Golden Eagles	3:41.0
3rd place, bronze medalist(s)	Rosalyn Bryant	Cal State Los Angeles Golden Eagles	3:41.0
4th		Iowa State Cyclones	3:42.2
4th	Debbie Esser	Iowa State Cyclones	3:42.2
5th	Sue Sebastien	Michigan State Spartans	3:45.1
5th	Elaine Carr	Michigan State Spartans	3:45.1
5th	Johanna Matthyssen	Michigan State Spartans	3:45.1
5th	Sue Latter	Michigan State Spartans	3:45.1
6th		Cal State Northridge Matadors	3:47.0
6th	Julie Brown	Cal State Northridge Matadors	3:47.0
7th		Houston Cougars	3:47.3
8th		Morgan State Lady Bears	3:48.6
9th		Oregon Ducks	3:53.8

4 × 880 yards relay
Pl.	Name	Team	Mark
1st place, gold medalist(s)	Kathy Chisam	UCLA Bruins	8:42.0
1st place, gold medalist(s)	Kate Keyes	UCLA Bruins	8:42.0
1st place, gold medalist(s)	Debbie Roberson	UCLA Bruins	8:42.0
1st place, gold medalist(s)	Kathy Weston	UCLA Bruins	8:42.0
2nd place, silver medalist(s)		Iowa State Cyclones	8:48.9
2nd place, silver medalist(s)	Debbie Vetter	Iowa State Cyclones	8:48.9
3rd place, bronze medalist(s)		Oregon Ducks	8:50.8
4th		Tennessee Volunteers	8:51.4
5th	Lisa Turner	Penn State Nittany Lions	8:54.4
5th	Peggy Hall	Penn State Nittany Lions	8:54.4
5th	Lea Ventura	Penn State Nittany Lions	8:54.4
5th	Kris Bankes	Penn State Nittany Lions	8:54.4
6th		Cal State Northridge Matadors	8:54.8
6th	Julie Brown	Cal State Northridge Matadors	8:54.8

Sprint medley relay (Note: Held at a total distance of 880 yards, with the first leg running 220 yards, the middle two legs running 110 yards, and the anchor leg running 440 yards.)
Pl.	Name	Team	Mark
1st place, gold medalist(s)	Evelyn Ashford	UCLA Bruins	1:39.4
1st place, gold medalist(s)	Modupe Oshikoya	UCLA Bruins	1:39.4
1st place, gold medalist(s)	Debbie Roberson	UCLA Bruins	1:39.4
1st place, gold medalist(s)	Kathy Weston	UCLA Bruins	1:39.4
2nd place, silver medalist(s)		Cal State Los Angeles Golden Eagles	1:39.6
2nd place, silver medalist(s)	Rosalyn Bryant	Cal State Los Angeles Golden Eagles	1:39.6
3rd place, bronze medalist(s)	Cecelia Branch	UNLV Rebels	1:41.8
3rd place, bronze medalist(s)	Nedra Washington	UNLV Rebels	1:41.8
3rd place, bronze medalist(s)	Emma Jean Major	UNLV Rebels	1:41.8
3rd place, bronze medalist(s)	Delores Lee Render	UNLV Rebels	1:41.8
4th		Morgan State Lady Bears	1:43.7
5th		Stephen F. Austin Ladyjacks	1:44.2
6th		Prairie View A&M Lady Panthers	NT
7th		Penn State Nittany Lions	1:44.7
		Texas Woman's Pioneers	DQ (Note: Originally ran 1:41.4 for 3rd)

High jump
Pl.	Name	Team	Mark
1st place, gold medalist(s)	Louise Ritter	Texas Woman's Pioneers	6 ft 1 1/2 in (1.86 m)
2nd place, silver medalist(s)	Pam Spencer	Seattle Pacific Falcons	5 ft 11 in (1.8 m)
3rd place, bronze medalist(s)	Maggie Garrison	Washington Huskies	5 ft 9 in (1.75 m)
4th	Chris Rammling	UCLA Bruins	5 ft 9 in (1.75 m)
5th	Paula Girven	Maryland Terrapins	5 ft 9 in (1.75 m)
6th	Beverly Washington	Illinois Fighting Illini	5 ft 7 in (1.7 m)
7th	Chestine Martin	Prairie View A&M Lady Panthers	5 ft 7 in (1.7 m)
8th	Lori Parrish	Utah Utes	5 ft 7 in (1.7 m)
9th	Theresa Smith	Seattle Pacific Falcons	5 ft 7 in (1.7 m)
10th	Marilyn Dubbs	Nebraska–Kearney Lopers	5 ft 7 in (1.7 m)
11th	Hellena Foxworth	Jackson State Lady Tigers	5 ft 7 in (1.7 m)

Long jump
Pl.	Name	Team	Mark
1st place, gold medalist(s)	Jodi Anderson	Cal State Northridge Matadors	21 ft 6 in (6.55 m)
2nd place, silver medalist(s)	Lorraine Ray	Florida Gators	20 ft 6 3/4 in (6.26 m) w
3rd place, bronze medalist(s)	Modupe Oshikoya	UCLA Bruins	20 ft 5 1/4 in (6.22 m)
4th	Sheila Pettit	Prairie View A&M Lady Panthers	20 ft 5 in (6.22 m)
5th	Shonel Ferguson	Florida Gators	19 ft 10 3/4 in (6.06 m) w
6th	Anita Lee	Michigan State Spartans	19 ft 8 3/4 in (6.01 m) w
7th	Mary Ayers	Prairie View A&M Lady Panthers	19 ft 5 in (5.91 m) w
8th	Diane Kummer	UIC Flames	19 ft 2 in (5.84 m) w
9th	Vicki Betts	Cal State Los Angeles Golden Eagles	19 ft 0 1/2 in (5.8 m)
10th	Amy Davis	Houston Cougars	18 ft 11 1/4 in (5.77 m) w

Shot put (Note: Places 10 and 11 not listed)
Pl.	Name	Team	Mark
1st place, gold medalist(s)	Kathy Devine	Emporia State Hornets	51 ft 2 1/2 in (15.6 m)
2nd place, silver medalist(s)	Deanna Patrick	Morehead State Eagles	49 ft 8 1/4 in (15.14 m)
3rd place, bronze medalist(s)	Caryl Van Pelt	Washington Huskies	47 ft 10 1/4 in (14.58 m)
4th	Jane Haist	Tennessee Volunteers	47 ft 10 in (14.57 m)
5th	Lorna Griffin	Seattle Pacific Falcons	47 ft 6 in (14.47 m)
6th	Emily Dole	Long Beach State Beach	47 ft 3 in (14.4 m)
7th	Karen Marshall	Cal State Northridge Matadors	46 ft 8 in (14.22 m)
8th	Christy Tumberger	Kansas State Wildcats	46 ft 5 in (14.14 m)
9th	Jill Stenwall	Kansas State Wildcats	44 ft 11 1/2 in (13.7 m)
12th	Marcia Mecklenburg	Seattle Pacific Falcons	44 ft 1 3/4 in (13.45 m)

Discus throw
Pl.	Name	Team	Mark
1st place, gold medalist(s)	Jane Haist	Tennessee Volunteers	168 ft 1 in (51.23 m)
2nd place, silver medalist(s)	Lorna Griffin	Seattle Pacific Falcons	164 ft 5 in (50.11 m)
3rd place, bronze medalist(s)	Karen Marshall	Cal State Northridge Matadors	163 ft 4 in (49.78 m)
4th	Cindy Pottle	Central Washington Wildcats	158 ft 10 in (48.41 m)
5th	Julie Hansen	Seattle Pacific Falcons	155 ft 1 in (47.26 m)
6th	Marcia Mecklenburg	Seattle Pacific Falcons	153 ft 3 in (46.71 m)
7th	Linda Mongtomery	Texas State Bobcats	147 ft 10 in (45.05 m)
8th	Emily Dole	Long Beach State Beach	143 ft 9 in (43.81 m)
9th	Mary Stevenson	Oregon Ducks	142 ft 10 in (43.53 m)
10th	Jamie Gordon	Florida Gators	142 ft 1 in (43.3 m)

Javelin throw
Pl.	Name	Team	Mark
1st place, gold medalist(s)	Karin Smith	UCLA Bruins	197 ft 9 in (60.27 m)
2nd place, silver medalist(s)	Cathy Sulinski	Cal State East Bay Pioneers	177 ft 5 in (54.07 m)
3rd place, bronze medalist(s)	Connie Gassen	Cal State Northridge Matadors	171 ft 5 in (52.24 m)
4th	Celeste Wilkinson	Arizona State Sun Devils	168 ft 4 in (51.3 m)
5th	Sonia Bennett	Seattle Pacific Falcons	161 ft 2 in (49.12 m)
6th	Keri Camarigg	Morehead State Eagles	156 ft 6 in (47.7 m)
7th	Renne Lambrecht	Western Oregon Wolves	154 ft 7 in (47.11 m)
8th	Marilyn White	Arizona State Sun Devils	151 ft 1 in (46.05 m)
9th	Sue Visconage	Southern Illinois Salukis	150 ft 0 in (45.72 m)
10th	Jill Hirschinger	Utah State Aggies	145 ft 3 in (44.27 m)
11th	Sue Banta	George Fox Bruins	144 ft 1 in (43.91 m)

Pentathlon
Pl.	Name	Team	Mark
1st place, gold medalist(s)	Dana Collins	Arizona State Sun Devils	4092 pts
2nd place, silver medalist(s)	Linda Cornelius	Texas A&M Aggies	3990 pts
3rd place, bronze medalist(s)	Teri Seippel	Eastern Kentucky Colonels	3950 pts
4th	Guilia Monteforte	Cal State Northridge Matadors	3815 pts
5th	Heidi Hertz	Florida Gators	3771 pts
6th	Nancy Malloy	Colorado State Rams	3768 pts
7th	Cyndie Cummings	Seattle Pacific Falcons	3761 pts
8th	Mitzi McMillin	USC Trojans	3747 pts
9th	Lori West	Colorado Buffaloes	3689 pts
10th	Mary Anne Harrington	Colorado State Rams	3548 pts
11th	Norma Pyle	Western Oregon Wolves	3496 pts
12th	Ann Crump	UNLV Rebels	3443 pts

== See also ==
- Association for Intercollegiate Athletics for Women championships § Outdoor track and field
- 1977 NCAA Division I Outdoor Track and Field Championships
