= 1975 IAAF World Cross Country Championships – Junior men's race =

Junior men's race at the 1975 IAAF World Cross Country Championships
- Organisers: IAAF
- Edition: 3rd
- Date: 16 March
- Host city: Rabat, Morocco
- Venue: Souissi Racecourse
- Events: 1
- Distances: 7 km – Junior men
- Participation: 60 athletes from 11 nations

The Junior men's race at the 1975 IAAF World Cross Country Championships was held in Rabat, Morocco, at the Souissi Racecourse on 16 March 1975. A report on the event was given in the Glasgow Herald.

Complete results, medallists, and the results of British athletes were published.

== Race results ==
=== Junior men's race (7 km) ===
==== Individual ====
Rank	Athlete	Country	Time
1st place, gold medalist(s)	Bobby Thomas	United States	20:59.8
2nd place, silver medalist(s)	José Luis González	Spain	21:18
3rd place, bronze medalist(s)	John Treacy	Ireland	21:23
4	Cándido Alario	Spain	21:29
5	Don Clary	United States	21:38
6	Mike Longthorn	England	21:41
7	Christian Foucquets	Belgium	21:42
8	Roy Kissin	United States	21:44
9	Louis Kenny	Ireland	21:45
10	Gerry Finnegan	Ireland	21:46
11	Jim Burns	Scotland	21:47
12	Nat Muir	Scotland	21:51
13	Gerry Redmond	Ireland	21:54
14	Claude Nullans	France	21:55
15	Ralph Serna	United States	22:00
16	Jef Gees	Belgium	22:06
17	Reinhold Strieder	West Germany	22:08
18	Vicente de la Parte	Spain	22:09
19	Yahia Hadka	Morocco	22:10
20	Luis Adsuara	Spain	22:11
21	Kenneth McCartney	Scotland	22:12
22	Mekki Mourdi	Algeria	
23	Abderrahmane Morceli	Algeria	
24	Steve Emson	England	
25	Jean-Marie Langlet	France	
26	Sergio Muscardin	Italy	
27	Ludo Belmans	Belgium	
28	Dick Hooper	Ireland	
29	Maurizio Da Rold	Italy	
30	Patriz Ilg	West Germany	
31	Poul Peeters	Belgium	
32	Karl Harrison	England	
33	Gianni Pedrini	Italy	
34	Hamadi Massoudi	Morocco	
35	Lahcene Babaci	Algeria	
36	Zaghdani Fedlaoui	Algeria	
37	Mike Deegan	England	
38	Salim Atache	Algeria	
39	Abdellah Rouimi	Morocco	
40	Driss Babzine	Morocco	
41	Jilali Benrahou	Morocco	
42	Francois Santmann	France	
43	Sergio Pozzi	Italy	
44	Manuel Perez	Spain	
45	René Busschodts	Belgium	
46	Michel Rogues	France	
47	Michael Spöttel	West Germany	
48	Dirk Vanderherten	Belgium	
49	Antonio Aparicio	Spain	
50	Nick Brawn	England	
51	John Graham	Scotland	
52	Francis Bentz	France	
53	Charles Haskett	Scotland	
54	Angelo Spadaro	Italy	
55	Mohamed Sniba	Morocco	
56	Paul Forbes	Scotland	
57	Philippe Gauthier	France	
58	Konrad Dobler	West Germany	
59	Vincenzo Chesa	Italy	
—	Werner Grommisch	West Germany	DNF

==== Teams ====
Rank	Team	Points
1st place, gold medalist(s)	United States: Bobby Thomas / 1; Don Clary / 5; Roy Kissin / 8; Ralph Serna / 15	29
2nd place, silver medalist(s)	Ireland: John Treacy / 3; Louis Kenny / 9; Gerry Finnegan / 10; Gerry Redmond / 13; (Dick Hooper) / (28)	35
3rd place, bronze medalist(s)	Spain: José Luis González / 2; Cándido Alario / 4; Vicente de la Parte / 18; Luis Adsuara / 20; (Manuel Perez) / (44); (Antonio Aparicio) / (49)	44
4	Belgium: Christian Foucquets / 7; Jef Gees / 16; Ludo Belmans / 27; Poul Peeters / 31; (René Busschodts) / (45); (Dirk Vanderherten) / (48)	81
5	Scotland: Jim Burns / 11; Nat Muir / 12; Kenneth McCartney / 21; John Graham / 51; (Charles Haskett) / (53); (Paul Forbes) / (56)	95
6	England: Mike Longthorn / 6; Steve Emson / 24; Karl Harrison / 32; Mike Deegan / 37; (Nick Brawn) / (50)	99
7	Algeria: Mekki Mourdi / 22; Abderrahmane Morceli / 23; Lahcene Babaci / 35; Zaghdani Fedlaoui / 36; (Salim Atache) / (38)	116
8	France: Claude Nullans / 14; Jean-Marie Langlet / 25; Francois Santmann / 42; Michel Rogues / 46; (Francis Bentz) / (52); (Philippe Gauthier) / (57)	127
9	Italy: Sergio Muscardin / 26; Maurizio Da Rold / 29; Gianni Pedrini / 33; Sergio Pozzi / 43; (Angelo Spadaro) / (54); (Vincenzo Chesa) / (59)	131
10	Morocco: Yahia Hadka / 19; Hamadi Massoudi / 34; Abdellah Rouimi / 39; Driss Babzine / 40; (Jilali Benrahou) / (41); (Mohamed Sniba) / (55)	132
11	West Germany: Reinhold Strieder / 17; Patriz Ilg / 30; Michael Spöttel / 47; Konrad Dobler / 58; (Werner Grommisch) / (DNF)	152

- Note: Athletes in parentheses did not score for the team result

== Participation ==
An unofficial count yields the participation of 60 athletes from 11 countries in the Junior men's race. This is in agreement with the official numbers as published.

- Algeria (5)
- Belgium (6)
- England (5)
- France (6)
- Ireland (5)
- Italy (6)
- Morocco (6)
- Scotland (6)
- Spain (6)
- United States (4)
- West Germany (5)

== See also ==
- 1975 IAAF World Cross Country Championships – Senior men's race
- 1975 IAAF World Cross Country Championships – Senior women's race
