= Carmen Valero =

Spanish middle-distance runner (1955–2024)

- Valero at 1977 IAAF World Cross Country Championships

Personal information
- Full name: Carmen Valero Omedes
- Born: 4 October 1955 Castelserás, Spain
- Died: 2 January 2024 (aged 68) Sabadell, Spain
- Height: 166 cm (5 ft 5 in)
- Weight: 53 kg (117 lb)

Sport
- Sport: Middle distance running
- Events: 800–5000 m, cross country running
- Retired: 1987
Medal record
Representing Spain
World Cross Country Championships
Gold medal – first place	1976 Chepstow	Cross country
Gold medal – first place	1977 Düsseldorf	Cross country
Bronze medal – third place	1975 Rabat	Cross country

Carmen Valero Omedes (4 October 1955 – 2 January 2024) was a Spanish middle-distance runner, who was best known for representing her native country at the 1976 Summer Olympics in Montreal. Although eliminated in the heats of the 800 and the 1500 metres, Valero was the only woman in the Spanish track and field squad for the Montreal Games, and became the first female athlete to ever represent the country in those sports at the Summer Olympic Games.

Valero won two consecutive women's races at the IAAF World Cross Country Championships in 1976 and 1977, while also winning the bronze medal at the same competition in 1975.

== Early life and career ==
Born in Castelserás, Spain, Valero moved to Cerdanyola with her family as a child, after her elder sister had been diagnosed with asthma. She first took up running at the age of eight, before being advised to move to Sabadell in order to join an athletics club.

At the age of 12, she took part in the Jean Bouin race, held on the Montjuïc hill in Barcelona, under the false name of "Teodora Rodríguez", having still not obtained an official sporting license.

In 1969, Valero joined her first club, Joventut Atlètica Sabadell, where she started training under coach Josep Molíns and taking part in her first cross-country competitions, while carrying on with her studies and a side job. She then went on to race for CN Barcelona and Agrupació Esportiva Marathon.

== Senior career ==
After winning two consecutive Spanish Cross Country Youth Championships in 1970 and 1971, Valero won her first three senior titles the following year, gaining the gold medal in the cross-country and 500-metre races at the Catalan Championships, as well as the 1500-metre race at the Spanish Championships. The same year, she also made her debut at the International Cross Country Championships (later rebranded as World Cross Country Championships), where she finished 31st out of 44 contestants.

In 1973, Valero won the cross-country races both at the Catalan and Spanish Championships, as well as her second consecutive 1500-metre races at the latter contest; later that year, she was awarded the Best Sporting Woman of the Year prize (Mejor Deportista del año) by sports magazine Mundo Deportivo, an accolade she would also receive in 1975, 1976 and 1977.

In 1974, Valero made her debut at the European Athletics Championships. In 1975, aged 19, she won the bronze medal in the senior women's race at the IAAF World Cross Country Championships in Rabat, trailing behind only Julie Brown and Bronisława Ludwichowska. In the same year, she also finished third in the 1500-metre race at the Mediterranean Games in Algiers.

In February 1976, Valero won her first gold medal in the senior women's race at the IAAF World Cross Country Championships in Chepstow; In the process, she became the first Spanish athlete to win the World Champion title in the aforementioned category. Upon reaching the finish line, she rebuked at a member of the Royal Spanish Athletics Federation, Julio Bravo, who had mocked her and other female athletes the day before the race.

Antes de correr, la Federación dio una charla a los chicos. A nosotras, ni caso. "¿Qué no se hace la reunión?", pregunté yo. "No, ya la hemos hecho: haced lo que podáis. Las mujeres sois unas culonas y unas pechugonas". En la carrera fui por delante con Kazankina, la rusa, la más fuerte. A falta de un kilómetro ataqué y, al llegar a la meta, vi al de la Federación y le dije: "Mira como ganan las culonas y pechugonas". "Perdona, disculpa", me dijo. "No, no, si la manera de pensar ya se ve", le dije.

[...]

Before the race, the Federation gave a team talk to the boys. To us [female athletes], not a single word. I asked, "What, will the meeting not be held?". [They replied,] "No, we've already done it: do what you can. You women are big-assed and busty." During the race, I went ahead of Kazankina, [...] the strongest [runner at the time]. With one kilometer to go, I sprinted and, as I got to the finish line, I saw the Federation's guy and told him: "Look how big-assed and busty women win!". He said to me, "Excuse me, I'm sorry..." I replied, "No, no, I can see the way you think."

— Carmen Valero, from a 2018 interview for Diario AS

Later that same year, Valero took part in the Summer Olympics in Montreal, competing in the 800-metre and the 1500-metre races, and eventually failing to progress through the heats of both categories. Later in her life, she expressed regret over her performance in the 1500 metres, naming it "the worst disappointment of [her] career". Nevertheless, being the only woman in the Spanish track and field squad for the Montreal Games, she became the first female athlete to ever represent the country in those sports at the Summer Olympic Games.

In March 1977, Valero won her second consecutive World Champion title in the senior women's race at the 1977 IAAF World Cross Country Championships in Düsseldorf, ahead of former Olympic champion Lyudmila Bragina. In 1978, she took part in the European Athletics Championships for the second time in her career.

In 1980, Valero announced her retirement, following a series of injuries and her decision to take care of her family, as well as her growing dissatisfaction with the treatment she received from the Spanish Federation's board – she never managed to turn professional as an athlete, since female runners were significantly underpaid by the Federation in comparison to their male colleagues.

However, two years later – shortly after the birth of her daughter – she returned to train consistently, and eventually convinced the Federation to let her take part in the Spanish Cross Country Championship, where she won the race; despite having qualified for that year's World Championships, she declined the invitation, ironically urging a member of the Federation to "put a skirt on" and sign up instead.

In 1986, she once again returned to competing, and won two more national titles in the 5000 metres and the cross-country race, while also finishing first in two different road races: the San Silvestre Vallecana, held in Madrid, and the Jean Bouin, held in Barcelona.

Valero officially retired from running competitions in 1987, shortly after criticizing the Spanish Federation for not calling her up for the World Cross Country Championships in Poland. Throughout her career, aside of her two world cross-country titles, she also won three Spanish national titles in the 800 metres, seven in the 1500 metres, four in the 3000 metres, one in the 5000 metres, two in the 1500 metres indoor and eight in cross-country. She also won multiple titles at the Catalan Championships, seven of which in cross-country, as well as one each in the 800 metres (both indoor and outdoor) and the 1500 metres indoor, five in the 1500 metres outdoor and two in the 3000 metres. She held the Spanish records for the 800, 1500 and 3000 metres, and represented Spain internationally in 25 occasions.

== Personal life and death ==
Due to her semi-professional status, Valero worked part-time at a savings bank in Sabadell. She married José Antonio Mellado, who served as her coach in the last phase of her career; the couple had a daughter, Carmen, in 1982.

In December 1987, she received the Honor Medal by the International Amateur Athletic Federation.

Following her retirement from running competitions, Valero became a member of the executive board of the Royal Spanish Athletics Federation, under president José María Odriozola, serving in the role from January 1989 to 1993; she was then appointed as the vice-president and sporting director for the athletics team of CN Sabadell.

In 1999, she took part in the New York City Marathon, completing it in about three hours and 13 minutes; she then participated in the Madrid Marathon in 2001.

In February 2001, Valero was named the Best Spanish Female Athlete of the 20th century by the Royal Spanish Athletics Federation, with the men's prize going to Fermín Cacho. On 20 November of the same year, she was awarded the Silver Medal of the Royal Order of Sporting Merit by the Spanish Ministry of Education, Culture and Sport for her sporting merits. She also received the Silver Medal for Sporting Merits by the National Sports Council. In 2003, she received the Medalla del Deporte ("Medal of Sport") by the Generalitat de Catalunya.

In December 2017, Valero collected a special Human Rights prize, awarded by the General Council of Spanish Lawyers, on behalf of Kathrine Switzer, who had become the first woman to complete the Boston Marathon as an officially registered competitor. In 2018, she was named between the 80 Legends of Spanish Sport by Marca, in coincidence with the magazine's 80th anniversary.

In May 2023, she was invited to take part in the fourth Memorial Miguel de la Quadra-Salcedo, held at the Complutense University of Madrid.

Valero died from complications of a stroke on 2 January 2024, at age 68, in Sabadell.
