= Kate Keyes =

American long-distance runner (born 1956)

- Keyes c. 1972

Personal information
- Born: November 13, 1956 (age 70)

Sport
- Country: United States
- Sport: Athletics
- Event: Cross country running
Medal record
Women's athletics
Representing United States
World Cross Country Championships
| Gold medal – first place | 1975 Rabat | Senior team |

Kate Keyes (born September 13, 1956) is an American former long-distance runner. She was the team gold medalist in the women's race at the 1975 World Cross Country Championships.

== Career ==
=== Prep ===
Beginning as a mile runner in 1971, Keyes ran as a prep for the Tamalpais High School Red-Tailed Hawks. She was coached by Krieg Vezie and was competitive against nationally-ranked runners in 1972. She was one of the first prominent girls' cross country runners in her era as the sport was being introduced. She was named Marin Independent Journal's Prep of the Week in November 1972.

Keyes maintained a two-year unbeaten streak from her second race in 1971 to October 1973. She was named to Citizens Savings Athletic Foundation's All Northern California track and field team in 1974.

=== Collegiate ===
Beginning in the fall of 1974, Keyes ran for the UCLA Bruins track and field and cross country teams. She won the 1974 USA Cross Country Championships team competition and was 26th individually.

Keyes was 3rd in Francie Larrieu Smith's February 1975 world indoor record mile run performance. At the 1975 USA Indoor Track and Field Championships, Keyes was runner-up in the two miles behind Brenda Webb. In March 1975, Keyes was 2nd in the 1500 m at the USA–USSR Track and Field Dual Meet Series, beating Lyudmila Bragina in the process.

She was selected for the American women's team at the 1975 World Cross Country Championships. At the race, Keyes finished 11th individually to contribute to America's team gold medal.

The following month, she broke the distance medley relay national record with a time of 11:29, running the 1320-yard leg. Keyes scored in three events at the 1975 AIAW Outdoor Track and Field Championships to contribute to UCLA's team title.

Keyes was trained by Chuck DeBus at UCLA, a young coach who was described as "charismatic" but also was said to have "Svengalian influence" on his athletes. When DeBus was suspended from the team for improper conduct, Keyes defended him and boycotted her school's program along with 16 or 17 other women, competing for his Los Angeles Track Club instead. She was one of five athletes to lose her scholarship due to boycotting the UCLA track team despite being financially dependent on it. Keyes said of the case, "If Chuck DeBus was fat, ugly and married with six kids, none of this would be happening [...] He happens to be a good-looking man and there is a lot of jealousy". DeBus fundraised to allow for Keyes' trip to the World Cross Country Championships after The Athletics Congress declined to fund it. Representing the LA Track Club, Keyes competed at the 1975 USA Cross Country Championships.

At the 1976 indoor USA–USSR Track and Field Dual Meet Series, Keyes finished 3rd in the 1500 m. Kate was considered a 'sleeper' to make the U.S. 1976 Summer Olympic team in track; she had been featured by the United States Olympic & Paralympic Committee in the Olympian magazine one year prior to the Games. She was sixth in the 1500 m at the 1976 United States Olympic trials, failing to make the team.

Having returned to the team, Keyes was 5th in the 1500 m and won the 4 × 880 yards relay at the 1977 AIAW Outdoor Track and Field Championships. The new UCLA coach Pat Connolly named Keyes as a prospect to break the women's marathon world record later in her career.

Keyes represented the Maccabi Track Club in 1978 along with UCLA. After finishing 8th in the 1500 m at the 1978 AIAW Outdoor Track and Field Championships, she announced her intention to transfer to the Cal Poly Mustangs cross country team. She competed alongside her sister Maggie on the Cal Poly cross country team in the fall, and was 125th at the AIAW Cross Country Championships.

For the 1979 track season, Keyes transferred again and competed for the Cal State Northridge Matadors track and field team. She was their top finisher at the AIAW regional cross country championship but did not advance to the national championship.

=== Professional ===
Keyes was 3rd in the 1500 m at the 1981 USA Outdoor Track and Field Championships. She again made a national podium in 1983, finishing 3rd in the 3000 m.

== Personal life ==
Keyes was born on September 13, 1956. Her father Art Keyes worked in insurance in Santa Rosa, California. She was from Mill Valley, California, and attended Tamalpais High School. At Tamalpais, she was a teacher's aide and also participated in backpacking and piano playing. Her older sister Liza was also a runner and her younger sister, Maggie Keyes-Kraft, was the winner of the mile run at the 1980 USA Indoor Track and Field Championships.
