= Christine Price =

British runner

Christine Price (née Haskett; born 30 November 1952) is a former British middle- and long-distance runner, who represented Scotland.

At the 1970 British Commonwealth Games she placed eighth in the 1500 metres and at the 1986 Commonwealth Games tenth in the 10,000 metres.

Ten times she started at the World Cross Country Championships, with following places:

- 1973 in Waregem: 27th
- 1974 in Monza: 33rd
- 1975 in Rabat: 23rd
- 1976 in Chepstow: 23rd
- 1977 in Düsseldorf: 61st
- 1981 in Madrid: 68th
- 1982 in Rome: 36th
- 1985 in Lisbon: 94th
- 1986 in Colombier: 57th
- 1987 in Warsaw: 81st
