= Rita Thijs =

Belgian sprinter

Personal information
- Nationality: Belgian
- Born: 7 February 1958 (age 67)

Sport
- Sport: Sprinting
- Event: 4 × 400 metres relay

Rita Thijs (born 7 February 1958) is a former Belgian sprinter. She competed in the women's 4 × 400 metres relay at the 1976 Summer Olympics.
