= Grabowo Bobowskie =

Village in Pomeranian Voivodeship, Poland

Grabowo
- Village
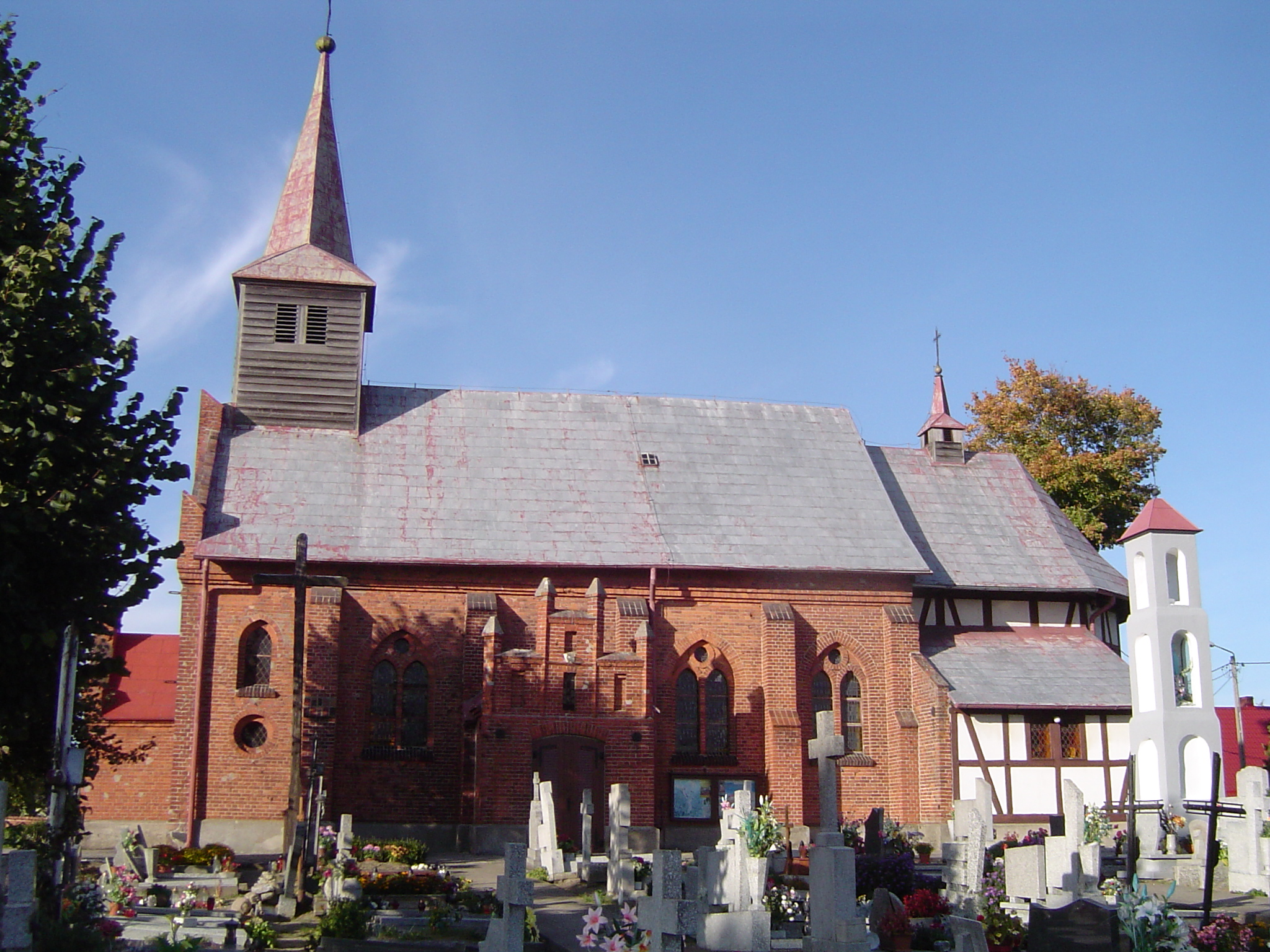
- The Church of St. Adalbert

- Location within Poland
- Coordinates: 53°50′46″N 18°34′50″E
- Country: Poland
- Voivodeship: Pomeranian
- County: Starogard
- Gmina: Bobowo
- Population (2022): 486
- Time zone: UTC+1 (CET)
  - Summer (DST): UTC+2 (CEST)
- Vehicle registration: GST

Grabowo [ɡraˈbɔvɔ bɔˈbɔfskʲɛ] is a village in the administrative district of Gmina Bobowo, within Starogard County, Pomeranian Voivodeship, in northern Poland. It is located within the ethnocultural region of Kociewie in the historic region of Pomerania.
