= Julie Isphording =

American long-distance runner

Mary Julie Isphording (born December 5, 1961, in Cincinnati, Ohio) is a retired female long-distance runner from the United States. She competed for her native country at the 1984 Summer Olympics in Los Angeles, California, but failed to finish. Isphording set her personal best in the classic distance (2:30:54) in 1989.
Bobbi Gibb, the first woman to have run the entire Boston Marathon, sculpted the 12-inch bronze figurines of a pony-tailed girl running that were given as trophies to Joan Benoit Samuelson, Julie Brown (athlete), and Isphording, the top three women marathoners at the US Olympic trials in 1984.

== Achievements ==
Year	Competition	Venue	Position	Event	Notes
Representing the United States
1984	Olympic Games	Los Angeles, United States	—	Marathon	DNF
1990	Los Angeles Marathon	Los Angeles, United States	1st	Marathon	2:32:25

== See also ==
- World Fit
