= Don Clary =

American long-distance runner

Medal record

Men's athletics

Representing the United States

IAAF World Indoor Games
Silver medal – second place	1985 IAAF World Indoor Games	3000 m

Donald Gene Clary Jr. (born July 29, 1957) is an American former long-distance runner who competed mainly in 5000 meters and cross country running. He represented the United States at the 1984 Summer Olympics and competed three times at the IAAF World Cross Country Championships, taking a junior title in 1975 and a senior team silver medal in 1980. He was the 3000 meters silver medallist at the 1985 IAAF World Indoor Games.

== Career ==
Don Clary was born in Anchorage, Alaska, and graduated from East Anchorage High School in 1975. Clary had his first success as a junior (under-20) athlete at the 1975 IAAF World Cross Country Championships where his fifth-place finish took the American juniors to the team title, alongside Bobby Thomas, Roy Kissin, and Ralph Serna. He went on to attend the University of Oregon and ran for the Oregon Ducks collegiate team. At the 1978 NCAA Division I Men's Cross Country Championships he placed seventh and was runner-up in the team rankings alongside classmate Alberto Salazar. He ran the 3000-meter steeplechase at the 1978 USA Outdoor Track and Field Championships and reached seventh place. He won his first national title that year, however, doing so in the one hour run.

His senior international debut came at the 1980 IAAF World Cross Country Championships, where his 43rd-place finish ina team of Craig Virgin (the winner), Daniel Dillon, Kenneth Martin, Steve Plasencia, and Mark Anderson brought the Americans the silver medals. He began to focus on track running more and progressed up the national rankings, taking fifth in the 5000 meters at the 1980 United States Olympic Trials then third at the 1981 USA Outdoors. He moved up the placings at the 1982 IAAF World Cross Country Championships in 27th overall, but the American team fared poorly in sixth. A fourth-place finish at the national championships meant he missed the 1983 World Championships in Athletics, but he still gained selection for the 1983 Pan American Games, at which he came fifth.

Clary was third in the 5000 m at the Olympic trials in 1984 and thus gained his first selection. At the 1984 Los Angeles Olympics he came twelfth in the semi-finals. The only international individual medal of his career came at the newly launched 1985 IAAF World Indoor Games. At the event in Paris he was a close runner-up to Portugal's João Campos and took the silver medal. He placed high nationally in the two following seasons, taking third in 1986 and fourth in 1987 at the national championships, but never competed at a major international event after that.

== International competitions ==
Year	Competition	Venue	Position	Event	Notes
1975	World Cross Country Championships	Rabat, Morocco	5th	Junior race	21:38
1975	World Cross Country Championships	Rabat, Morocco	1st	Junior team	29 pts
1980	World Cross Country Championships	Paris, France	43rd	Senior race	38:23
1980	World Cross Country Championships	Paris, France	2nd	Senior team	163 pts
1982	World Cross Country Championships	Rome, Italy	27th	Senior race	34:49
1982	World Cross Country Championships	Rome, Italy	6th	Senior team	300 pts
1984	Olympic Games	Los Angeles, United States	12th (semis)	5000 m	13:46.02
1985	IAAF World Indoor Games	Paris, France	2nd	3000 m	7:57.78
