= Barbara Moore (athlete) =

New Zealand long-distance runner

Personal information
- Nationality: New Zealander
- Born: 27 July 1957 (age 68)

Sport
- Sport: Athletics
- Event: long distance
Medal record
Representing New Zealand
Women's Athletics
Commonwealth Games
Bronze medal – third place	1990 Auckland	10000m

Barbara K. Moore (born 27 July 1957) is a female retired athlete from New Zealand, who specialised in long-distance running during her career.

== Biography ==
Moore finished third behind Deirdre Nagle in the 3000 metres event at the British 1979 WAAA Championships.

Moore competed for New Zealand in the 1990 Commonwealth Games, winning a bronze in the 10,000m race.

She is a recipient of the New Zealand 1990 Commemoration Medal.
