= Sergio Muscardin =

Italian long-distance runner

Personal information
- Nationality: Italian
- Born: 27 October 1956 (age 69)

Sport
- Country: Italy
- Sport: Athletics
- Event: Long-distance running
- Club: ASSI Giglio Rosso

Achievements and titles
- Personal best: 10,000 m: 29:31.7 (1978)

Sergio Muscardin (born 27 October 1956) is a former Italian male long-distance runner who competed at one edition of the IAAF World Cross Country Championships at senior level (1976),
