= Derna Casetti =

Italian middle-distance runner

Personal information
- National team: Italy (4 caps 1977)
- Born: 11 March 1959 (age 66) Casalmaggiore, Italy

Sport
- Country: Italy
- Sport: Athletics
- Events: Middle-distance running; Cross country running

Derna Casetti (born 11 March 1959) is a former Italian female middle-distance and cross-country runner who competed at individual senior level at the World Athletics Cross Country Championships (1977).
