= Julie Brown (runner) =

American retired distance runner

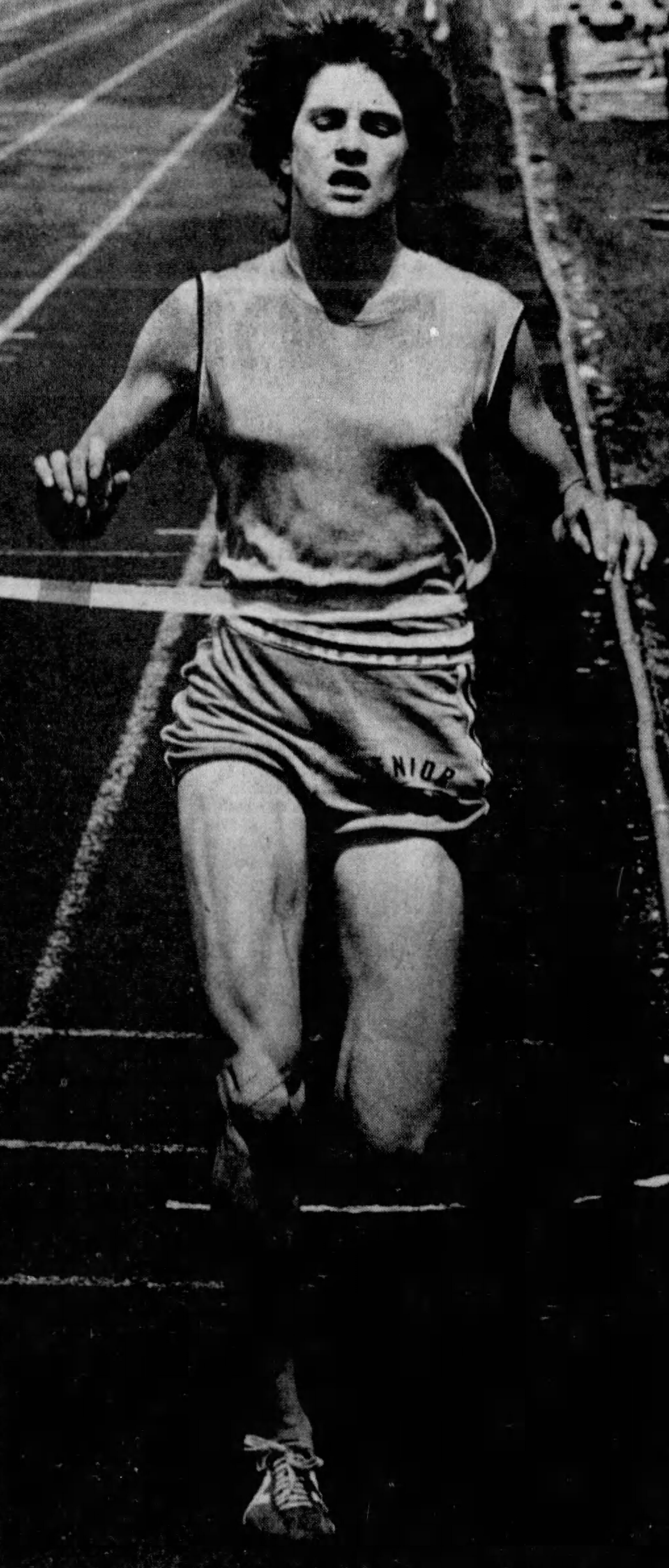
- Winning a high school track race in 1973

Personal information
- Full name: Julie Ann Brown
- Nationality: American
- Born: February 4, 1955 (age 71) Billings, Montana
- Height: 5 ft 6 in (1.68 m)
- Weight: 108 lb (49 kg)

Sport
- Country: USA
- Sport: Athletics
- Events: 800m--2:00.2 1500m--4:06.4, Mile--4:30.23, 3000m--8:58.27, 5000m--15:39.5, cross-country-(No time), marathon--2:26:24
- Team: Adidas
- Coached by: Bill Dellinger; 1983-85
- Retired: 1987
Medal record
Women's athletics
Representing United States
IAAF World Cross Country Championships
Gold medal – first place	1975 Rabat	Long course
Pan American Games
Silver medal – second place	1979 San Juan	800 m
Silver medal – second place	1979 San Juan	1500 m
Silver medal – second place	1979 San Juan	3000 m
Olympic Boycott Games
Silver medal – second place	1980 Philadelphia	1500 m

Julie Ann Brown (born February 4, 1955) is a retired distance runner. She won the IAAF World Cross Country Championship in 1975 and represented the United States in the 1984 Summer Olympics in the women's marathon.

Brown set the American women's marathon record at the Nike OTC Marathon in 1978.

Brown concentrated on track and cross-country running prior to the Olympic trials but a victory in the Avon Women's Marathon in 1983 convinced her that she could qualify for the Olympic marathon team. She ran a conservative race staying in the pack until the midway point and broke away finishing second, 37 seconds behind the Olympic trials winner, Joan Benoit Samuelson. She broke the 10,000 metres world record setting a time of 35:00.4 minutes in 1975.

After her track career, Brown received her J.D. from Western State University and, joined a law firm as an attorney. In 1995 Brown, opened a law practice in San Diego, CA

== High school ==
Brown was born in Billings, Montana, and competed in a variety of distance events winning several state championships while attending Billings Senior High School. She competed in the 880-yard run winning the state championship for three years in a row starting in 1970. She still holds the All-State record with an 880-yard time of 2:11.0. She also won two 440-yard run championships and in her senior year, she was state cross-country champion as well.

== College ==
Brown started at the University of California, Los Angeles before switching to California State University, Northridge. As a college athlete she won Association for Intercollegiate Athletics for Women national championships in the 800 meters, 1500 meters, 3000 meters, and cross-country. Brown recalls how her UCLA cross country coach mistreated her and because of the environment at UCLA she decided to transfer to CSUN. She also won Amateur Athletic Union national titles in the 1500 meters, 3000 meters, cross-country, and marathon, as well as winning The Athletics Congress national titles in 3000 meters, cross-country, and marathon.

== US Championships ==
Julie Brown ended her running career in 1985 as a 13-time national champion and 20-time Team USA member either in track and cross country.

Year	Competition	Venue	Position	Event	Notes
Representing
1975	USA Outdoor Track and Field Championships	White Plains, New York, United States	1st	1500 meters	
1976	USA Marathon Championships	Culver City, California, United States	1st	Marathon	2:45:33
1978	USA Cross Country Championships	Memphis, Tennessee, United States	1st	5 km	16:32
1979	USA Indoor Track and Field Championships	New York, New York, United States	1st	Two Miles	9:46.1
1979	USA Outdoor Track and Field Championships	Walnut, California, United States	3rd	1500 meters	4:09.4
1979	USA Outdoor Track and Field Championships	Walnut, California, United States	3rd	3000 meters	8:58.3
1981	USA Cross Country Championships	Burbank, California, United States	1st	5 km	15:49
1982	USA Road Running Championships 25 km	Ventura, California, United States	1st	25 km	1:27:53
1983	USA Marathon Championships	Los Angeles, California, United States	1st	Marathon	2:26:26
1984	USA Olympic Trials Track and Field Championships	Los Angeles, California, United States	1st	5000 meters	15:39.50
1984	USA Olympic Trials Track and Field Championships	Los Angeles, California, United States	2nd	Marathon	2:31:41

Brown placed 8th at 1985 New York Marathon in 2:37:53 and 2nd at 1982 New York Marathon in 2:28:33. Brown won 1981 Dallas Marathon in 2:33:40.

== International ==
Brown placed 27th at 1974 IAAF World Cross Country Championships – Senior women's race in 13:34.8.

Brown won an IAAF World Cross Country Championship in 1975 in 13:42; the first American woman to do so. She won the race in a time of 13:42, five seconds ahead of Bronisława Ludwichowska from Poland.

At the 1979 Pan American Games, Brown won three silver medals, taking second place in the 800 meters, 1500 meters, and 3000 meters.

After graduating from CSUN, Brown moved to San Diego to train for the 1980 Olympics.

Brown qualified for the 1980 Summer Olympics in the 800 meters and 1500 meters but did not compete due to the boycott of the Olympics. She was one of 461 athletes to receive a Congressional Gold Medal instead.

She entered the marathon at the inaugural 1983 World Championships in Athletics, but failed to finish the competition.

Brown was sponsored by Adidas who set her up with coach Bill Dellinger and moved her from California to Eugene, Oregon in 1983 so she could focus on the marathon distance.

Bobbi Gibb, the first woman to have run the entire Boston Marathon, sculpted three 12-inch bronze figurines of a running pony-tailed girl that were given as trophies to Joan Benoit Samuelson, Julie Brown, and Julie Isphording, the top three women marathoners at the US Olympic trials in 1984. Julie Brown trained on President Reagan's Santa Barbara, California ranch prior to 1984 Olympic Games to adjust to the heat and humidity of 1984 Los Angeles Olympics. Brown did compete in the 1984 Olympics in the marathon, placing 36th.

Brown was later sponsored by Champion products; Brown was featured in magazines in an international ad for Vaseline - Sponsored Athletes in the 1980s only made six figures, so Julie Brown went to law school at night to pursue a career.

In July 2008, President Carter gave the 1980 Team USA athletes Congressional Congressional Gold Medal.
