= Silvia Terenghi =

Italian long-distance runner

Personal information
- National team: Italy (2 caps 1975-1977)
- Born: 9 September 1957 (age 68) Monza, Italy

Sport
- Country: Italy
- Sport: Athletics
- Events: Middle-distance running; Cross country running

Silvia Terenghi (born 9 September 1957) is a former Italian female middle-distance runner and cross-country runner who competed at individual senior level at the World Athletics Cross Country Championships (1975, 1977).
