= Cyndy Poor =

American Olympic track and field athlete (born 1953)

Cynthia Shepherd "Cyndy" Poor (born May 18, 1953, in Hanover, New Hampshire) is a retired American track and field athlete, known primarily for her success in middle-distance races.

== Biography ==
A 1971 graduate of Saratoga High School before California high schools had sports for girls (before Title IX) she ran with the San Jose Cindergals, an early powerhouse girls' track team under coach Augie Argabright. The team was dominated by distance runners, most notably Francie Larrieu, just one year Poor's senior. Starting off as a sprinter, she was gradually coaxed into running longer distances, while her sprinter's speed at the finish frequently served her well. Her 1973 400 metres time is still ranked in the top ten times at the University of California, Davis.

By the time she reached the 1976 United States Olympic Trials at Hayward Field in Eugene, Oregon, she was one of the favorites in the 800 metres behind two-time winner Madeline Manning. The trials race came to form as Poor used her sprinter's speed to move from fourth to second in the last 120 metres and qualify for the Olympics behind Manning. A few days later she joined Larrieu (who had made the Olympic team in 1972) in the 1500 metres trials. Larrieu entered the trials as the American recordholder, having spent the last several years battling and exchanging records with Jan Merrill. Merrill was a dominant frontrunner, with little finishing speed—a tactic that normally served her well by burning off most opponents except occasionally Larrieu. In the final, Merrill followed her normal tactic, but in this race both Larrieu and Cindy Bremser were determined to stay with Merrill, with Poor trailing in their wake. With 90 metres to go, Poor unleashed a furious kick that ultimately passed all three, Merrill in the last step. Not only did she qualify for the Olympics, but she set the American record at 4:07.32. In fact, the top four of this race beat Larrieu's previous record (with only three going to the Olympics, Bremser was the odd one out).

Her performance in the 1500 influenced her to focus her efforts at the 1976 Summer Olympics in Montreal, declining her position in the 800. In the 1500 she finished a non-qualifying 6th place in her trial round, while Merrill had to demolish Poor's American record in the semi-finals, running 4:02.61, just to make the final in fifth place. Poor was ranked #2 in the 800 and #3 in the 1500 in the U.S. 1976 was actually the first year Track & Field News did a ranking of U.S. women in the 800 and 1500. The following year she went on to win the USA Indoor Track and Field Championships at 800 metres.

She is married to Ron Jensen and is still a volunteer for the sport.
