= Margaret Coomber =

British middle-distance runner

Margaret Coomber née MacSherry
Personal information
- Nationality: British (English)
- Born: 13 June 1950 (age 76) Dartford, Kent, England
- Height: 171 cm (5 ft 7 in)
- Weight: 57 kg (126 lb)

Sport
- Sport: Athletics
- Event: Middle-distance running
- Club: Cambridge Harriers

Margaret Teresa Coomber (née MacSherry; born 13 June 1950) is a British retired middle-distance runner.

== Biography ==
At the 1972 Olympics Games in Munich, Coomber represented Great Britain in the women's 800 metres.

Coomber finished third behind Lesley Kiernan in the 800 metres event at the 1974 WAAA Championships.

Coomber competed for the Florida State Seminoles track and field team, where she led off the winning 4 × 880 yards relay team at the 1982 AIAW Indoor Track and Field Championships.
