= Anne Audain =

New Zealand runner (born 1955)

Anne Audain MBE
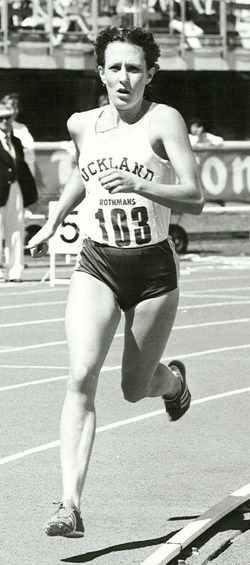
- Audain in 1979

Personal information
- Born: Anne Frances Garrett; 1 November 1955 (age 71) Auckland, New Zealand
- Height: 1.68 m (5 ft 6 in)
- Weight: 53 kg (117 lb)

Sport
- Country: New Zealand
- Sport: Track and field

Achievements and titles
- National finals: 800 m champion (1976, 1979); 1500 m champion (1976, 1979, 1980); 3000 m champion (1982, 1986); 5000 m champion (1987); 10,000 m champion (1990); 4 km road race champion (1972, 1973)
- Personal bests: 800 m – 2:04.4; 1500 m – 4:10.68; 10,000 m – 31:53.31; Marathon – 2:31:41
Medal record
Women's athletics
Representing New Zealand
Commonwealth Games
Gold medal – first place	1982 Brisbane	3000m
Silver medal – second place	1986 Edinburgh	10000m

Anne Frances Audain MBE (née Garrett; born 1 November 1955) is a New Zealand middle- and long-distance runner. She competed in three Olympic Games and four Commonwealth Games, winning the 1982 Commonwealth Games 3000m title and a silver medal in the 10,000m at the 1986 Commonwealth Games.

== Early life ==
Audain was adopted as a baby, and grew up in the South Auckland suburb of Ōtāhuhu. Owing to a bone deformity in both feet, Audain was unable to walk properly until age 13, when corrective surgery was performed. After the surgery she had to learn the heel-to-toe motion of walking.

Within a year, she was running as a member of the Otahuhu Athletics Club. At the age of 15, she won the Auckland senior cross-country title and finished third in the Auckland senior women’s 800 m. Her ability attracted the attention of the English 1956 Olympic 5000 m silver medalist Gordon Pirie, who had relocated to New Zealand. Pirie started coaching Audain and at age 16 she was selected to represent New Zealand in the 1500 m at the 1972 Summer Olympics in Munich. However, three weeks before the Games, she was withdrawn from the team, with New Zealand team officials deciding she was too young for the event.

== Career ==
At age 17, Audain finished ninth in the 1973 World Cross Country Championships. She ran in the 1500 m at the 1974 British Commonwealth Games in Christchurch, New Zealand, finishing sixth, and top New Zealander, in the final with a time of 4:21.1.

In the 1976 Summer Olympics in Montreal, Audain competed in both the 800 and 1500 m. Although she failed to get past the heats, she broke the New Zealand record for the 1500 m.

Prior to the start of the 1980s, major track and field athletics meetings had not had any women's events longer than 1500 metres. This started to change early in the new decade, and in March 1982, Audain competed in her first 5000 metres, breaking the world record. In the 1982 Commonwealth Games in Brisbane she won gold in the 3000 metres in 8:45.53, a New Zealand record. The record stood for 25 years until it was finally broken by Kim Smith of Auckland, when she ran 8:35.31 on 25 July 2007 in Monaco.

In the 1980s Audain was one of the best middle-distance runners in the world. In 1982, in what has been described as her "Annus mirabilis" - her amazing year - she entered 13 road races, won them all, and in each case set a women's course record. Between 1981 and 1991 she won the challenging Virginia 10 Miler six times, to this day the most ever by any competitor. In 1986 she won the silver medal at the Commonwealth Games in Edinburgh in the 10,000 m.

At the 1984 Olympic Games, Audain competed in the inaugural women's Olympic marathon. In the 1988 Games, her last, she finished 11th in the inaugural women's 10,000 metres.

In 1993, Audain founded the Idaho Women's Fitness Celebration 5K, now the largest 5-kilometre (3.1 mi) race for women in the USA.

== Honours and awards ==
Audain was awarded the New Zealand 1990 Commemoration Medal. In the 1995 New Year Honours, she was appointed a Member of the Order of the British Empire, for services to athletics.

In February 2008, Audain was inducted into the Running USA Hall of Champions, and on 3 February 2009 she was inducted into the New Zealand Sports Hall of Fame. She has the unique distinction of being in three Halls of Fame in two nations as in 2014 she was also inducted into the RRCA Distance Running Hall of Fame.

== International competitions ==
Year	Competition	Venue	Position	Event	Notes
Representing New Zealand
1973	World Cross Country Championships	Waregem, Belgium	9th	4.0 km	14:15
1974	British Commonwealth Games	Christchurch, New Zealand	6th	1500 m	4:21.1
1976	Olympic Games	Montreal, Canada	heats	800 m	2:05.78
1976	Olympic Games	Montreal, Canada	heats	1500 m	4:10.68
1977	World Cup	Düsseldorf, Germany	8th	1500 m	4:31.5
1982	Commonwealth Games	Brisbane, Australia	1st	3000 m	8:45.53
1984	Olympic Games	Los Angeles, United States	dnf	Marathon	—
1986	Commonwealth Games	Edinburgh, Scotland	2nd	10,000 m	31:53.31
1988	Olympic Games	Seoul, South Korea	11th	10,000 m	32:10.47
1990	Commonwealth Games	Auckland, New Zealand	11th	10,000 m	33:40.13
