= Bronisława Ludwichowska =

Polish former distance runner (born 1951)

Personal information
- Nationality: Polish
- Born: 18 September 1951 (age 74)

Sport
- Country: Poland
- Sport: Running
- Event: cross-country
Medal record
Women's running
Representing Poland
World Cross Country Championship
Silver medal – second place	1975 Rabat	Women's long course
Bronze medal – third place	1975 Rabat	Women's Team

Bronisława Ludwichowska (born 18 September 1951) is a Polish former distance runner who won the 1977 Women's Cinque Mulini cross-country race. She followed up a sixth-place finish at the 1974 IAAF World Cross Country Championships with a two medal performance in the following year's championships; winning an individual silver medal and a team bronze medal. Her silver medal time of 13:47 edged out third-place finisher, Carmen Valero of Spain by one second.
