= 1991 IAAF World Cross Country Championships – Senior women's race =

Senior women's race at the 1991 IAAF World Cross Country Championships
- Organisers: IAAF
- Edition: 19th
- Date: March 24
- Host city: Antwerp, Antwerp Province, Belgium
- Venue: Linkeroever Racecourse
- Events: 1
- Distances: 6.425 km – Senior women
- Participation: 126 athletes from 30 nations

The Senior women's race at the 1991 IAAF World Cross Country Championships was held in Antwerp, Belgium, at the Linkeroever Racecourse on March 24, 1991. A report on the event was given in The New York Times.

Complete results, medallists, and the results of British athletes were published.

== Race results ==
=== Senior women's race (6.425 km) ===
==== Individual ====
Rank	Athlete	Country	Time
1st place, gold medalist(s)	Lynn Jennings	United States	20:24
2nd place, silver medalist(s)	Derartu Tulu	Ethiopia	20:27
3rd place, bronze medalist(s)	Liz McColgan	United Kingdom	20:28
4	Luchia Yeshak	Ethiopia	20:29
5	Jane Ngotho	Kenya	20:30
6	Albertina Dias	Portugal	20:40
7	Susan Sirma	Kenya	20:46
8	Yelena Romanova	Soviet Union	20:50
9	Margaret Ngotho	Kenya	20:55
10	Marcianne Mukamurenzi	Rwanda	20:57
11	Natalya Sorokivskaya	Soviet Union	20:57
12	Fatuma Roba	Ethiopia	21:01
13	Nadezhda Galyamova	Soviet Union	21:02
14	Jenny Lund	Australia	21:03
15	Pauline Konga	Kenya	21:03
16	Marina Rodchenkova	Soviet Union	21:03
17	Conceição Ferreira	Portugal	21:05
18	Merima Denboba	Ethiopia	21:09
19	Annette Peters	United States	21:10
20	Tigist Moreda	Ethiopia	21:10
21	Susan Hobson	Australia	21:14
22	Izumi Maki	Japan	21:14
23	Olga Nazarkina	Soviet Union	21:15
24	Nadezhda Ilyina	Soviet Union	21:15
25	Viorica Ghican	Romania	21:16
26	Nadia Dandolo	Italy	21:17
27	Andrea Wallace	United Kingdom	21:17
28	Elaine van Blunk	United States	21:18
29	Gwyn Coogan	United States	21:19
30	Martine Fays	France	21:22
31	Silvana Pereira	Brazil	21:25
32	Estela Estévez	Spain	21:28
33	Véronique Collard	Belgium	21:29
34	Berhane Adere	Ethiopia	21:30
35	Liève Slegers	Belgium	21:31
36	Alison Wyeth	United Kingdom	21:32
37	Gitte Karlshøj	Denmark	21:33
38	Sonia McGeorge	United Kingdom	21:33
39	Iulia Negura	Romania	21:33
40	Anuța Cătună	Romania	21:34
41	Angelines Rodriguez	Spain	21:36
42	Farida Fatès	France	21:37
43	Trina Painter	United States	21:38
44	Elena Fidatof	Romania	21:40
45	Marjan Freriks	Netherlands	21:41
46	Hellen Chepngeno	Kenya	21:41
47	Lucy Smith	Canada	21:41
48	Roberta Brunet	Italy	21:42
49	Maria Guida	Italy	21:42
50	Rosario Murcia	France	21:42
51	Shelly Steely	United States	21:44
52	Rita de Jesús	Brazil	21:45
53	Odile Ohier	France	21:45
54	Irena Czuta	Poland	21:46
55	Tsugumi Fukuyama	Japan	21:46
56	Paola Cabrera	Mexico	21:47
57	Benita Perez	Mexico	21:48
58	Ana Moreira	Portugal	21:49
59	Lunuta Alungulesei	Romania	21:49
60	Daria Nauer	Switzerland	21:50
61	Megumi Fujiwara	Japan	21:50
62	Lisa Harvey	Canada	21:51
63	Nives Curti	Italy	21:52
64	Aurora Cunha	Portugal	21:52
65	Catherina McKiernan	Ireland	21:56
66	Tanja Kalinowski	Germany	21:57
67	Carmen Fuentes	Spain	21:59
68	Annick de Gooyer	Canada	22:01
69	Anne Cross	Australia	22:02
70	Claudia Borgschulze	Germany	22:03
71	Mikiko Oguni	Japan	22:03
72	Sally Ellis^{†}	United Kingdom	22:03
73	Valerie Chauvel	France	22:04
74	Fernanda Ribeiro	Portugal	22:05
75	Rika Ota	Japan	22:06
76	Lisa York	United Kingdom	22:07
77	Ria van Landeghem	Belgium	22:08
78	Lesley Graham	New Zealand	22:09
79	Ingrid Delagrange	Belgium	22:10
80	Lucía Rendón	Mexico	22:10
81	May Allison	Canada	22:11
82	Linden Wilde	New Zealand	22:12
83	Julia Vaquero	Spain	22:13
84	Mary O'Connor	New Zealand	22:13
85	Rizoneide Vanderley	Brazil	22:13
86	Mariana Stanescu	Romania	22:14
87	Krishna Stanton	Australia	22:15
88	Hitomi Inoue	Japan	22:16
89	Orietta Mancia	Italy	22:17
90	Alena Mocariová	Czechoslovakia	22:18
91	Maria van Gestel	Belgium	22:19
92	Anja de Brabant	Belgium	22:19
93	Sharon Ann Hayes	New Zealand	22:19
94	Isabella Moretti	Switzerland	22:20
95	Louise Cavanagh	Ireland	22:27
96	Tamara Salomon	Canada	22:29
97	Maria Luisa Lárraga	Spain	22:32
98	Maree Turner	New Zealand	22:36
99	Celine Martin	France	22:39
100	Laura Faccio	Italy	22:40
101	Cleuza Irineu	Brazil	22:40
102	Leticia Martinez	Mexico	22:42
103	Yvonne van der Kolk	Netherlands	22:42
104	Andrea Whitcombe	United Kingdom	22:44
105	Valerie Vaughan	Ireland	22:51
106	Anne Keenan-Buckley	Ireland	22:51
107	Inés Rodríguez	Argentina	22:52
108	Lesley Morton	New Zealand	22:54
109	Marianne van de Linde	Netherlands	22:55
110	Nanda Shaner Yadav	India	23:10
111	Roisin Smyth	Ireland	23:13
112	Annie van Stiphout	Netherlands	23:14
113	Jolanda Holdener	Switzerland	23:23
114	Poonam Taneja	India	23:31
115	Yvonne Kramer	Netherlands	23:35
116	Angelina Tellez	Mexico	23:39
117	Lukose Leelamma	India	23:40
118	Maryse Pyndiah	Mauritius	23:44
119	Vally Satayabhama	India	23:49
120	Teresa McKenna	Ireland	23:51
121	Suresh Bala	India	24:06
122	Cornelia Melis	Aruba	24:30
123	Sheila Seebaluck	Mauritius	24:35
124	Ana Gutiérrez	U.S. Virgin Islands	24:38
—	Fernanda Marques	Portugal	DNF
—	Dolores Rizo	Spain	DNF

^{†}: Athlete marked in the results list as nonscorer.

==== Teams ====
Rank	Team	Points
1st place, gold medalist(s)	Kenya: Jane Ngotho / 5; Susan Sirma / 7; Margaret Ngotho / 9; Pauline Konga / 15; (Hellen Chepngeno) / (46)	36
2nd place, silver medalist(s)	Ethiopia: Derartu Tulu / 2; Luchia Yeshak / 4; Fatuma Roba / 12; Merima Denboba / 18; (Tigist Moreda) / (20); (Berhane Adere) / (34)	36
3rd place, bronze medalist(s)	Soviet Union: Yelena Romanova / 8; Natalya Sorokivskaya / 11; Nadezhda Galyamova / 13; Marina Rodchenkova / 16; (Olga Nazarkina) / (23); (Nadezhda Ilyina) / (24)	48
4	United States: Lynn Jennings / 1; Annette Peters / 19; Elaine van Blunk / 28; Gwynn Coogan / 29; (Trina Painter) / (43); (Shelly Steely) / (51)	77
5	United Kingdom: Liz McColgan / 3; Andrea Wallace / 27; Alison Wyeth / 36; Sonia McGeorge / 38; (Lisa York) / (76); (Andrea Whitcombe) / (104)	104
6	Portugal: Albertina Dias / 6; Conceição Ferreira / 17; Ana Moreira / 58; Aurora Cunha / 64; (Fernanda Ribeiro) / (74); (Fernanda Marques) / (DNF)	145
7	Romania: Viorica Ghican / 25; Iulia Negura / 39; Anuța Cătună / 40; Elena Fidatof / 44; (Lunuta Alungulesei) / (59); (Mariana Stanescu) / (86)	148
8	France: Martine Fays / 30; Farida Fatès / 42; Rosario Murcia / 50; Odile Ohier / 53; (Valerie Chauvel) / (73); (Celine Martin) / (99)	175
9	Italy: Nadia Dandolo / 26; Roberta Brunet / 48; Maria Guida / 49; Nives Curti / 63; (Orietta Mancia) / (89); (Laura Faccio) / (100)	186
10	Australia: Jenny Lund / 14; Susan Hobson / 21; Anne Cross / 69; Krishna Stanton / 87	191
11	Japan: Izumi Maki / 22; Tsugumi Fukuyama / 55; Megumi Fujiwara / 61; Mikiko Oguni / 71; (Rika Ota) / (75); (Hitomi Inoue) / (88)	209
12	Spain: Estela Estévez / 32; Angelines Rodriguez / 41; Carmen Fuentes / 67; Julia Vaquero / 83; (Maria Luisa Lárraga) / (97); (Dolores Rizo) / (DNF)	223
13	Belgium: Véronique Collard / 33; Liève Slegers / 35; Ria van Landeghem / 77; Ingrid Delagrange / 79; (Maria van Gestel) / (91); (Anja de Brabant) / (92)	224
14	Canada: Lucy Smith / 47; Lisa Harvey / 62; Annick de Gooyer / 68; May Allison / 81; (Tamara Salomon) / (96)	258
15	Brazil: Silvana Pereira / 31; Rita de Jesús / 52; Rizoneide Vanderley / 85; Cleuza Irineu / 101	269
16	Mexico: Paola Cabrera / 56; Benita Perez / 57; Lucía Rendón / 80; Leticia Martinez / 102; (Angelina Tellez) / (116)	295
17	New Zealand: Lesley Graham / 78; Linden Wilde / 82; Mary O'Connor / 84; Sharon Ann Hayes / 93; (Maree Turner) / (98); (Lesley Morton) / (108)	337
18	Netherlands: Marjan Freriks / 45; Yvonne van der Kolk / 103; Marianne van de Linde / 109; Annie van Stiphout / 112; (Yvonne Kramer) / (115)	369
19	Ireland: Catherina McKiernan / 65; Louise Cavanagh / 95; Valerie Vaughan / 105; Anne Keenan-Buckley / 106; (Roisin Smyth) / (111); (Teresa McKenna) / (120)	371
20	India: Nanda Shaner Yadav / 110; Poonam Taneja / 114; Lukose Leelamma / 117; Vally Satayabhama / 119; (Suresh Bala) / (121)	460

- Note: Athletes in parentheses did not score for the team result

== Participation ==
An unofficial count yields the participation of 126 athletes from 30 countries in the Senior women's race. This is in agreement with the official numbers as published.

- Argentina (1)
- Aruba (1)
- Australia (4)
- Belgium (6)
- Brazil (4)
- Canada (5)
- Czechoslovakia (1)
- Denmark (1)
- Ethiopia (6)
- France (6)
- Germany (2)
- India (5)
- Ireland (6)
- Italy (6)
- Japan (6)
- Kenya (5)
- Mauritius (2)
- Mexico (5)
- Netherlands (5)
- New Zealand (6)
- Poland (1)
- Portugal (6)
- Romania (6)
- Rwanda (1)
- Soviet Union (6)
- Spain (6)
- Switzerland (3)
- United Kingdom (7)
- United States (6)
- U.S. Virgin Islands (1)

== See also ==
- 1991 IAAF World Cross Country Championships – Senior men's race
- 1991 IAAF World Cross Country Championships – Junior men's race
- 1991 IAAF World Cross Country Championships – Junior women's race
