= 1991 World Championships in Athletics – Women's 3000 metres =

These are the official results of the Women's 3.000 metres event at the 1991 IAAF World Championships in Tokyo, Japan. There were a total number of 40 participating athletes, with three qualifying heats and the final held on Monday 26 August 1991.

The winning margin was 0.24 seconds which as of 2024 remains the narrowest winning margin in the women's 3,000 metres at these championships. Given that this event was discontinued after the 1993 edition, it is unlikely to be reduced.

== Medalists ==
Gold	Tetyana Dorovskikh; Soviet Union (URS)
Silver	Yelena Romanova; Soviet Union (URS)
Bronze	Susan Sirma; Kenya (KEN)

== Schedule ==
- All times are Japan Standard Time (UTC+9)

Heats
24.08.1991 – 18:20h
Final
26.08.1991 – 19:25h

== Final ==
RANK	FINAL	TIME
	Tetyana Dorovskikh (URS)	8:35.82
	Yelena Romanova (URS)	8:36.06
	Susan Sirma (KEN)	8:39.41
4.	Päivi Tikkanen (FIN)	8:41.30
5.	Margareta Keszeg (ROM)	8:42.02
6.	Roberta Brunet (ITA)	8:42.64
7.	Judi St. Hilaire (USA)	8:44.02
8.	Annette Peters (USA)	8:44.02
9.	Gitte Karlshøj (DEN)	8:44.35
10.	Yvonne Murray (GBR)	8:44.52
11.	Alison Wyeth (GBR)	8:44.73
12.	Pauline Konga (KEN)	8:46.66
13.	Lyudmila Borisova (URS)	8:51.49
14.	Shelly Steely (USA)	8:53.70
15.	Marie-Pierre Duros (FRA)	9:08.31

== Qualifying heats ==
- Held on Saturday 1991-08-24

RANK	HEAT 1	TIME
1.	Susan Sirma (KEN)	8:46.56
2.	Yelena Romanova (URS)	8:46.84
3.	Shelly Steely (USA)	8:48.54
4.	Roberta Brunet (ITA)	8:51.41
5.	Anke Schäning (GER)	8:56.02
6.	Catherina McKiernan (IRL)	9:00.05
7.	Iulia Ionescu (ROM)	9:00.72
8.	Daria Nauer (SUI)	9:05.08
9.	Khin Khin Htwe (MYA)	9:07.34
10.	Leah Pells (CAN)	9:10.10
11.	Minori Hayakari (JPN)	9:14.02
12.	Vilma Peña (CRC)	9:54.49
13.	Mirna El Hagg (LIB)	11:34.81

RANK	HEAT 2	TIME
1.	Yvonne Murray (GBR)	9:00.86
2.	Lyudmila Borisova (URS)	9:00.94
3.	Päivi Tikkanen (FIN)	9:00.98
4.	Annette Peters (USA)	9:01.01
5.	Derartu Tulu (ETH)	9:01.04
6.	Jana Kučeríková (TCH)	9:05.69
7.	Carmem de Oliveira (BRA)	9:09.71
8.	Zheng Lijuan (CHN)	9:17.78
9.	Robyn Meagher (CAN)	9:20.38
10.	Roisin Smyth (IRL)	9:40.13
11.	Ama Amewo (TOG)	11:17.85
—	Jane Ngotho (KEN)	DNS
—	Priscilla Mamba (SWZ)	DNS

RANK	HEAT 3	TIME
1.	Gitte Karlshøj (DEN)	8:50.01
2.	Marie-Pierre Duros (FRA)	8:50.05
3.	Tetyana Dorovskikh (URS)	8:50.39
4.	Margareta Keszeg (ROM)	8:50.61
5.	Alison Wyeth (GBR)	8:50.69
6.	Judi St. Hilaire (USA)	8:54.19
7.	Pauline Konga (KEN)	8:54.67
8.	Jenny Lund (AUS)	8:57.86
9.	Julia Vaquero (ESP)	8:58.90
10.	Fernanda Ribeiro (POR)	9:01.90
11.	Bigna Samuel (VIN)	10:04.96
12.	Ana Isabel Elias (ANG)	10:13.42
13.	Jen Allred (GUM)	10:18.44
—	Marie Phoebe Juillet (HAI)	DNF

== See also ==
- 1987 Women's World Championships 3.000 metres (Rome)
- 1988 Women's Olympic 3.000 metres (Seoul)
- 1990 Women's European Championships 3.000 metres (Split)
- 1992 Women's Olympic 3.000 metres (Barcelona)
- 1993 Women's World Championships 3.000 metres (Stuttgart)
