= 5000 metres at the Olympics =

5000 metres at the Olympic Games
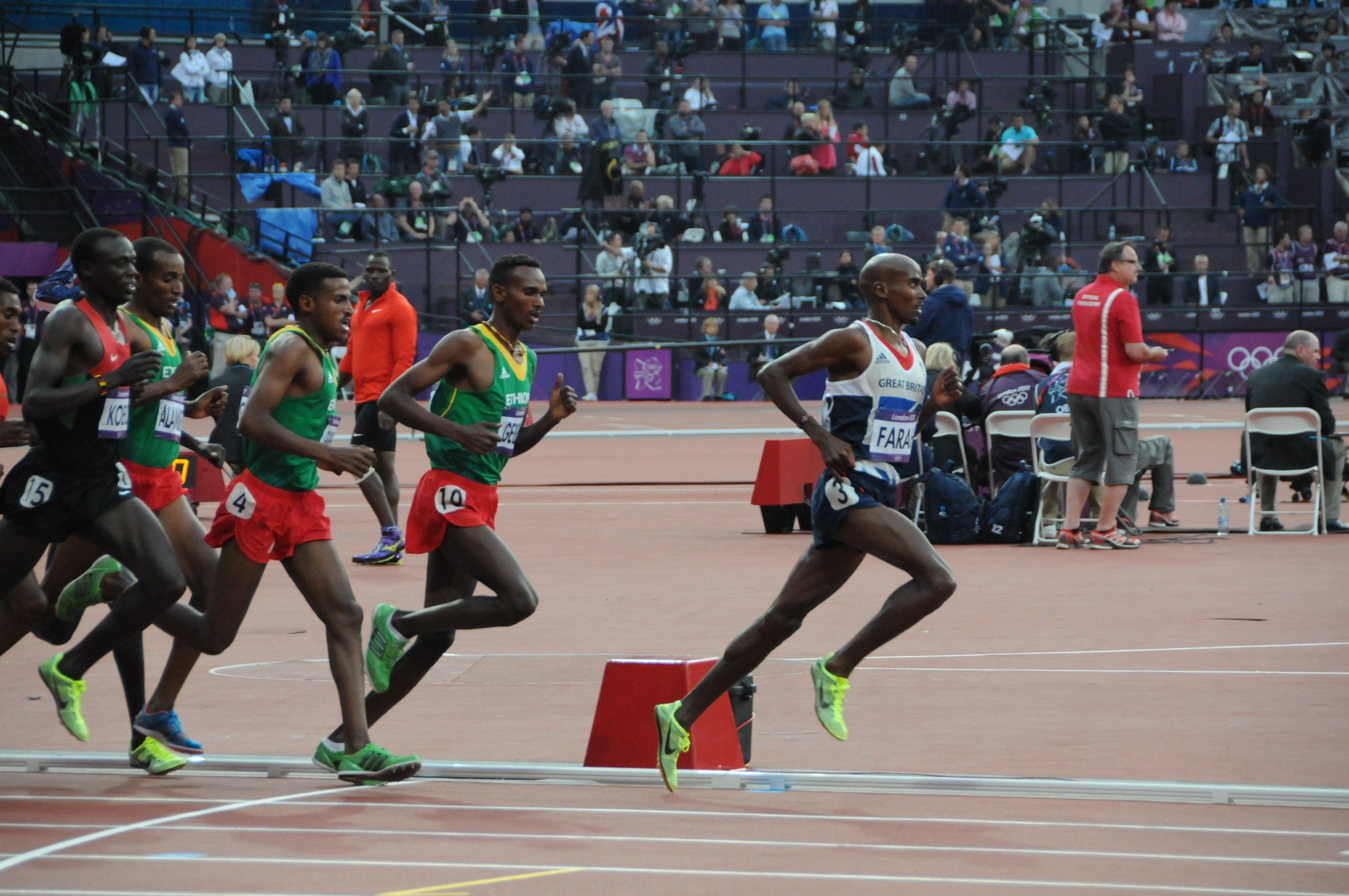
- The 2012 Olympic men's 5000 m final

Overview
- Sport: Athletics
- Gender: Men and women
- Years held: Men: 1912–2024; Women: 1984–2024

Olympic record
- Men: Kenenisa Bekele (ETH) 12:57.82 (2008)
- Women: Vivian Cheruiyot (KEN) 14:26.17 (2016)

Reigning champion
- Men: Jakob Ingebrigtsen (NOR)
- Women: Beatrice Chebet (KEN)

The 5000 metres at the Summer Olympics has been contested since the fifth edition of the multi-sport event. The men's 5000 m has been present on the Olympic athletics programme since 1912. The 3000 metres was the first women's Olympic long-distance track event, making its initial appearance at the 1984 Olympics, and this distance was extended to match the men's event from 1996 onwards. It is the most prestigious 5000 m race at elite level. The competition format typically has two qualifying heats leading to a final between fifteen athletes.

The Olympic records for the event are 12:57.82 minutes for men, set by Kenenisa Bekele in 2008, and 14:26.17 minutes for women, set by Vivian Cheruiyot in 2016. At the inaugural 1912 Olympic 5000 metres, Hannes Kolehmainen set the first official IAAF world record for the event. However, this remains the only time that the 5000 metres world record has been broken in Olympic competition. The best time recorded for the women's Olympic 3000 m was 8:26.53 minutes by Tetyana Dorovskikh (then Samolenko) at the 1988 Seoul Olympics; the world record for that event was not improved during an Olympic race.

Only three athletes have won multiple titles in the event. Lasse Virén became the first with his back-to-back wins in 1972 and 1976, while Meseret Defar became the first woman to win two titles in 2012, having previously won in 2004. Mo Farah became the third person with multiple titles, and the second with back-to-back wins, in 2012 and 2016. Three athletes have reached the podium on three occasions: Defar was also the 2008 bronze medallist, Tirunesh Dibaba won medals from 2004 to 2012, and Paavo Nurmi won medals in the period from 1920 to 1928. Historically, athletes in this event have also had success in the 10,000 metres at the Olympics. The winner of the men's Olympic 5000 m has completed a long-distance track double on nine occasions, the most recent being Farah at the 2016 Rio Olympics. Tirunesh Dibaba is the only woman to complete this double, having done so at the 2008 Beijing Olympics.

Ethiopia is the most successful nation in the event, having taken six gold medals and fifteen medals in total. The next most successful nation, depending on definition, is either Finland or Kenya. In terms of gold medals, Finland is equal with Ethiopia at six, but has a total of twelve overall medals to Ethiopia's 15. Finland's period of great success in the 1920s and 1930s led to the wide usage of the nickname the Flying Finns; Kaarlo Maaninka was the last Finnish athlete to medal over 5000 m, in 1980. Kenya have won fourteen medals in the 5000 m, second only to Ethiopia in total medals in the event, although John Ngugi and Vivian Cheruiyot are the only Kenyans to have won Olympic gold.

== Medal summary ==
=== Men ===
Games	Gold	Silver	Bronze
1912 Stockholm	Hannes Kolehmainen; Finland	Jean Bouin; France	George Hutson; Great Britain
1920 Antwerp	Joseph Guillemot; France	Paavo Nurmi; Finland	Eric Backman; Sweden
1924 Paris	Paavo Nurmi; Finland	Ville Ritola; Finland	Edvin Wide; Sweden
1928 Amsterdam	Ville Ritola; Finland	Paavo Nurmi; Finland	Edvin Wide; Sweden
1932 Los Angeles	Lauri Lehtinen; Finland	Ralph Hill; United States	Lauri Virtanen; Finland
1936 Berlin	Gunnar Höckert; Finland	Lauri Lehtinen; Finland	Henry Jonsson; Sweden
1948 London	Gaston Reiff; Belgium	Emil Zátopek; Czechoslovakia	Willem Slijkhuis; Netherlands
1952 Helsinki	Emil Zátopek; Czechoslovakia	Alain Mimoun; France	Herbert Schade; Germany
1956 Melbourne	Vladimir Kuts; Soviet Union	Gordon Pirie; Great Britain	Derek Ibbotson; Great Britain
1960 Rome	Murray Halberg; New Zealand	Hans Grodotzki; United Team of Germany	Kazimierz Zimny; Poland
1964 Tokyo	Bob Schul; United States	Harald Norpoth; United Team of Germany	Bill Dellinger; United States
1968 Mexico City	Mohammed Gammoudi; Tunisia	Kipchoge Keino; Kenya	Naftali Temu; Kenya
1972 Munich	Lasse Virén; Finland	Mohammed Gammoudi; Tunisia	Ian Stewart; Great Britain
1976 Montreal	Lasse Virén; Finland	Dick Quax; New Zealand	Klaus-Peter Hildenbrand; West Germany
1980 Moscow	Miruts Yifter; Ethiopia	Suleiman Nyambui; Tanzania	Kaarlo Maaninka; Finland
1984 Los Angeles	Saïd Aouita; Morocco	Markus Ryffel; Switzerland	António Leitão; Portugal
1988 Seoul	John Ngugi; Kenya	Dieter Baumann; West Germany	Hansjörg Kunze; East Germany
1992 Barcelona	Dieter Baumann; Germany	Paul Bitok; Kenya	Fita Bayisa; Ethiopia
1996 Atlanta	Vénuste Niyongabo; Burundi	Paul Bitok; Kenya	Khalid Boulami; Morocco
2000 Sydney	Million Wolde; Ethiopia	Ali Saïdi-Sief; Algeria	Brahim Lahlafi; Morocco
2004 Athens	Hicham El Guerrouj; Morocco	Kenenisa Bekele; Ethiopia	Eliud Kipchoge; Kenya
2008 Beijing	Kenenisa Bekele; Ethiopia	Eliud Kipchoge; Kenya	Edwin Soi; Kenya
2012 London	Mo Farah; Great Britain	Dejen Gebremeskel; Ethiopia	Thomas Longosiwa; Kenya
2016 Rio de Janeiro	Mo Farah; Great Britain	Paul Chelimo; United States	Hagos Gebrhiwet; Ethiopia
2020 Tokyo	Joshua Cheptegei; Uganda	Mohammed Ahmed; Canada	Paul Chelimo; United States
2024 Paris	Jakob Ingebrigtsen; Norway	Ronald Kwemoi; Kenya	Grant Fisher; United States

==== Multiple medalists ====
Rank	Athlete	Nation	Olympics	Gold	Silver	Bronze	Total
1	Mohamed Farah	Great Britain	2012–2016	2	0	0	2
2	Lasse Virén	Finland	1972–1976	2	0	0	2
3	Paavo Nurmi	Finland	1920–1928	1	2	0	3
4	Ville Ritola	Finland	1924–1928	1	1	0	2
5	Lauri Lehtinen	Finland	1932–1936	1	1	0	2
6	Emil Zátopek	Czechoslovakia	1948–1952	1	1	0	2
7	Mohammed Gammoudi	Tunisia	1968–1972	1	1	0	2
8	Dieter Baumann	Germany	1988–1992	1	1	0	2
9	Kenenisa Bekele	Ethiopia	2004–2008	1	1	0	2
10	Paul Bitok	Kenya	1992–1996	0	2	0	2
11	Eliud Kipchoge	Kenya	2004–2008	0	1	1	2
12	Edvin Wide	Sweden	1924–1928	0	0	2	2

==== Medals by country ====
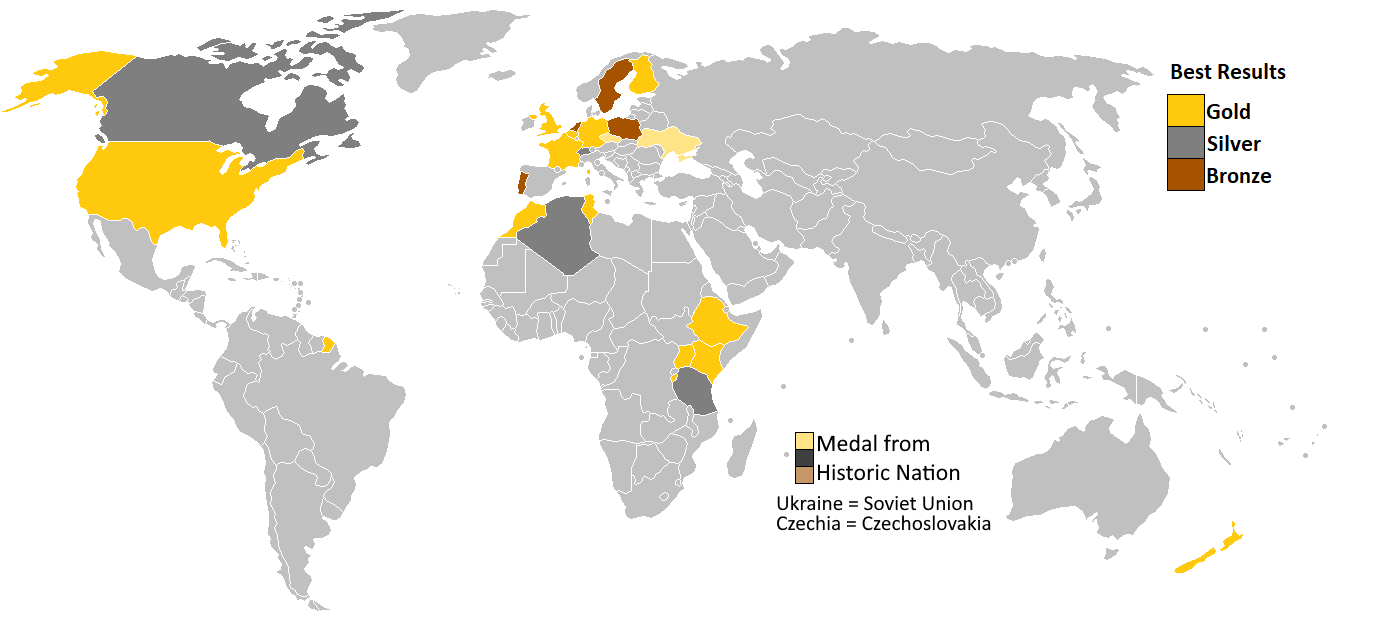
Map of countries' best results – Men's 5000 metres

Rank	Nation	Gold	Silver	Bronze	Total
1	Finland	6	5	2	13
2	Ethiopia	3	2	2	7
3	Great Britain	2	1	3	6
4	Morocco	2	0	2	4
5	Kenya	1	5	4	10
6	United States	1	2	3	6
7	Germany^{[nb]}	1	2	1	4
8	France	1	2	0	3
9=	Czechoslovakia	1	1	0	2
9=	New Zealand	1	1	0	2
9=	Tunisia	1	1	0	2
12=	Belgium	1	0	0	1
12=	Burundi	1	0	0	1
12=	Soviet Union	1	0	0	1
12=	Uganda	1	0	0	1
12=	Norway (NOR)	1	0	0	1
17	West Germany	0	1	1	2
18=	Algeria	0	1	0	1
18=	Canada	0	1	0	1
18=	Switzerland	0	1	0	1
18=	Tanzania	0	1	0	1
22	Sweden	0	0	4	4
23=	East Germany	0	0	1	1
23=	Netherlands	0	0	1	1
23=	Poland	0	0	1	1
23=	Portugal	0	0	1	1

- ^{nb} The German total includes teams both competing as Germany and the United Team of Germany, but not East or West Germany.

=== Women's 3000 metres ===
Games	Gold	Silver	Bronze
1984 Los Angeles	Maricica Puică; Romania	Wendy Smith-Sly; Great Britain	Lynn Williams; Canada
1988 Seoul	Tetyana Samolenko; Soviet Union	Paula Ivan; Romania	Yvonne Murray; Great Britain
1992 Barcelona	Yelena Romanova; Unified Team	Tetyana Dorovskikh; Unified Team	Angela Chalmers; Canada

==== Multiple medalists ====
Rank	Athlete	Nation	Olympics	Gold	Silver	Bronze	Total
1	Tetyana Dorovskikh	Soviet Union; Unified Team	1988–1992	1	1	0	2

==== Medalists by country ====
Rank	Nation	Gold	Silver	Bronze	Total
1=	Romania	1	1	0	2
1=	Unified Team	1	1	0	2
3	Soviet Union	1	0	0	1
4	Great Britain	0	1	1	2
5	Canada	0	0	2	2

=== Women's 5000 metres ===
Games	Gold	Silver	Bronze
1996 Atlanta	Wang Junxia; China	Pauline Konga; Kenya	Roberta Brunet; Italy
2000 Sydney	Gabriela Szabo; Romania	Sonia O'Sullivan; Ireland	Gete Wami; Ethiopia
2004 Athens	Meseret Defar; Ethiopia	Isabella Ochichi; Kenya	Tirunesh Dibaba; Ethiopia
2008 Beijing	Tirunesh Dibaba; Ethiopia	Meseret Defar; Ethiopia	Sylvia Kibet; Kenya
2012 London	Meseret Defar; Ethiopia	Vivian Cheruiyot; Kenya	Tirunesh Dibaba; Ethiopia
2016 Rio de Janeiro	Vivian Cheruiyot; Kenya	Hellen Obiri; Kenya	Almaz Ayana; Ethiopia
2020 Tokyo	Sifan Hassan; Netherlands	Hellen Obiri; Kenya	Gudaf Tsegay; Ethiopia
2024 Paris	Beatrice Chebet; Kenya	Faith Kipyegon; Kenya	Sifan Hassan; Netherlands

==== Multiple medalists ====
Rank	Athlete	Nation	Olympics	Gold	Silver	Bronze	Total
1	Meseret Defar	Ethiopia	2004–2012	2	1	0	3
2	Tirunesh Dibaba	Ethiopia	2004–2012	1	0	2	3
3	Vivian Cheruiyot	Kenya	2012–2016	1	1	0	2
4	Hellen Obiri	Kenya	2016–2020	0	2	0	2

==== Medalists by country ====
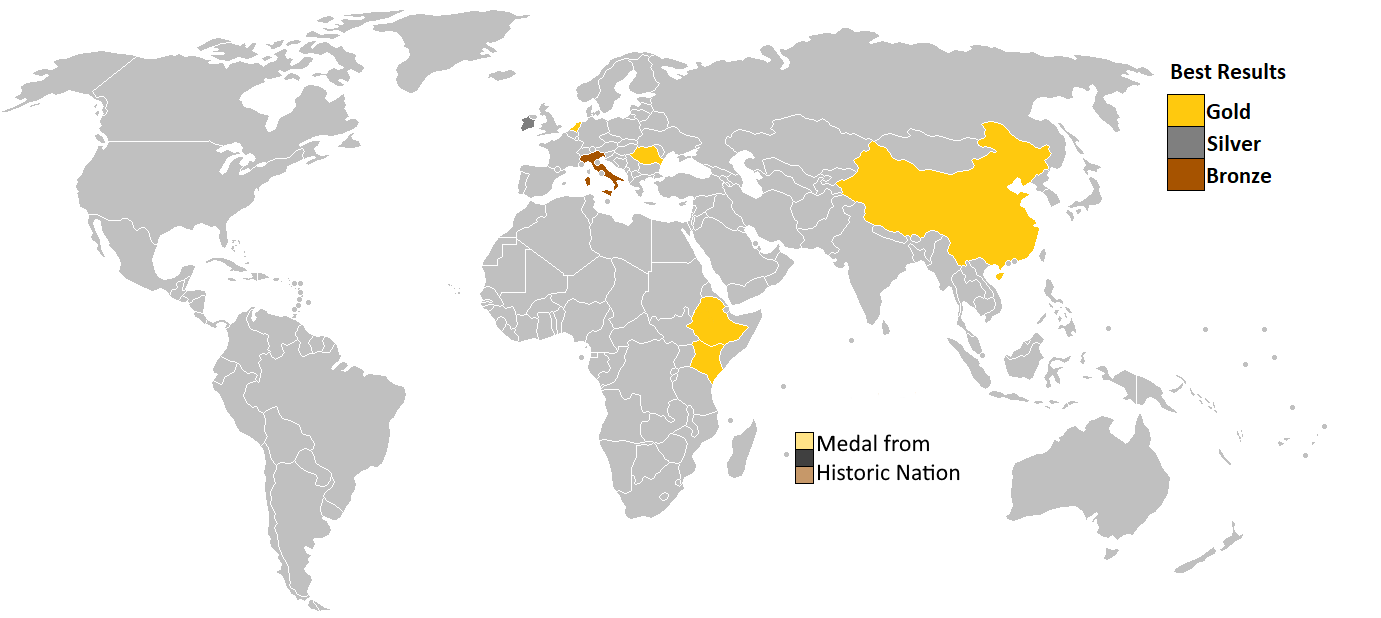
Map of countries' best results – Women's 5000 metres

Rank	Nation	Gold	Silver	Bronze	Total
1	Ethiopia	3	1	5	9
2	Kenya	2	6	1	9
3	Netherlands	1	0	1	2
4=	China	1	0	0	1
4=	Romania	1	0	0	1
6	Ireland	0	1	0	1
7	Italy	0	0	1	1
