= 1991 in the sport of athletics =

1991 in athletics
- Major world events: World Championships; World Indoor Championships

This article contains an overview of the year 1991 in athletics.

== International Events ==
- All-Africa Games
- Asian Championships
- Central American and Caribbean Championships
- Mediterranean Games
- Pan American Games
- South American Championships
- World Championships
- World Cross Country Championships
- World Indoor Championships
- World Student Games

== World records ==
=== Men ===
EVENT	ATHLETE	MARK	DATE	VENUE
100 metres	Leroy Burrell (USA)	9.90	14 June	New York City, USA
100 metres	Carl Lewis (USA)	9.86	25 August	Tokyo, Japan
20,000 metres	Arturo Barrios (MEX)	56:55.6	30 March	La Flèche, France
One hour run	Arturo Barrios (MEX)	21,101m	30 March	La Flèche, France
4 × 100 m Relay	United States (USA) • Michael Marsh • Leroy Burrell • Dennis Mitchell • Carl Lewis	37.67	7 August	Zürich
4 × 100 m Relay	United States (USA) • Andre Cason • Leroy Burrell • Dennis Mitchell • Carl Lewis	37.50	1 September	Tokyo
Pole vault	Sergey Bubka (URS)	6.07m	6 May	Shizuoka, Japan
Pole vault	Sergey Bubka (URS)	6.08m	9 June	Moscow
Pole vault	Sergey Bubka (URS)	6.09m	8 July	Formia, Italy
Pole vault	Sergey Bubka (URS)	6.10m	5 August	Malmö, Sweden
Long jump	Mike Powell (USA)	8.95m	30 August	Tokyo

- The relay team of the United States in the men's 4 × 100 m, formed by Michael Marsh, Leroy Burrell, Floyd Heard and Carl Lewis, equal the current world record, set the previous year by France at the European Championships, clocking 37.79 on 1991-08-03 at a meet in Monaco. The first mark was set by Max Morinière, Daniel Sangouma, Jean-Charles Trouabal and Bruno Marie-Rose on 1990-09-01 in Split, Yugoslavia.

=== Women ===
EVENT	ATHLETE	MARK	DATE	VENUE
Triple jump	Inessa Kravets (URS)	14.95 m	10 June	Moscow, Soviet Union
Half marathon	Elana Meyer (RSA)	1:07:59	18 May	East London, South Africa

== Men's Best Year Performers ==
=== 100 metres ===
RANK	1991 WORLD BEST PERFORMERS	TIME
1.	Carl Lewis (USA)	9.86
2.	Leroy Burrell (USA)	9.88
3.	Linford Christie (GBR)	9.92
4.	Frank Fredericks (NAM)	9.95
5.	Raymond Stewart (JAM)	9.96

=== 200 metres ===
RANK	1991 WORLD BEST PERFORMERS	TIME
1.	Michael Johnson (USA)	19.88
2.	Frank Fredericks (NAM)	20.08
3.	John Regis (GBR)	20.12
4.	Danny Everett (USA)	20.13
5.	Robson da Silva (BRA)	20.15

=== 400 metres ===
RANK	1991 WORLD BEST PERFORMERS	TIME
1.	Michael Johnson (USA)	44.17
2.	Antonio Pettigrew (USA)	44.36
3.	Roberto Hernández (CUB)	44.40
4.	Danny Everett (USA)	44.42
5.	Steve Lewis (USA)	44.52

=== 800 metres ===
RANK	1991 WORLD BEST PERFORMERS	TIME
1.	José Luíz Barbosa (BRA)	1:43.08
2.	William Tanui (KEN)	1:43.30
3.	Johnny Gray (USA)	1:43.84
4.	Mark Everett (USA)	1:43.93
5.	Billy Konchellah (KEN)	1:43.96

=== 1,500 metres ===
RANK	1991 WORLD BEST PERFORMERS	TIME
1.	Noureddine Morceli (ALG)	3:31.00
2.	Simon Doyle (AUS)	3:31.96
3.	Fermín Cacho (ESP)	3:32.03
4.	Peter Elliott (GBR)	3:32.94
5.	Saïd Aouita (MAR)	3:33.28

=== Mile ===
RANK	1991 WORLD BEST PERFORMERS	TIME
1.	Noureddine Morceli (ALG)	3:49.12
2.	Peter Elliott (GBR)	3:49.46
3.	Wilfred Kirochi (KEN)	3:49.77
4.	Jim Spivey (USA)	3:49.83
5.	Simon Doyle (AUS)	3:49.91

=== 3,000 metres ===
RANK	1991 WORLD BEST PERFORMERS	TIME
1.	Dieter Baumann (FRG)	7:33.91
2.	Yobes Ondieki (KEN)	7:34.74
3.	Noureddine Morceli (ALG)	7:37.34
4.	Brahim Boutayeb (MAR)	7:38.39
5.	Khalid Skah (MAR)	7:38.84

=== 5,000 metres ===
RANK	1991 WORLD BEST PERFORMERS	TIME
1.	Yobes Ondieki (KEN)	13:01.82
2.	Ibrahim Kinuthia (KEN)	13:09.76
3.	Salvatore Antibo (ITA)	13:10.10
4.	Brahim Boutayeb (MAR)	13:10.44
5.	Richard Chelimo (KEN)	13:11.76

=== 10,000 metres ===
RANK	1991 WORLD BEST PERFORMERS	TIME
1.	Richard Chelimo (KEN)	27:11.18
2.	John Ngugi (KEN)	27:11.62
3.	Khalid Skah (MAR)	27:23.29
4.	Salvatore Antibo (ITA)	27:24.55
5.	Thomas Osano (KEN)	27:28.87

=== Half marathon ===
RANK	1991 WORLD BEST PERFORMERS	TIME
1.	Lawrence Peu (RSA)	1:00:58

=== Marathon ===
RANK	1991 WORLD BEST PERFORMERS	TIME
1.	Koichi Morishita (JPN)	2:08:53
2.	Takeyuki Nakayama (JPN)	2:09:12
3.	Yakov Tolstikov (URS)	2:09:17
4.	Toru Mimura (JPN)	2:09:23
5.	Salvador García (MEX)	2:09:28

=== 110m hurdles ===
RANK	1991 WORLD BEST PERFORMERS	TIME
1.	Tony Dees (USA)	13.05
2.	Greg Foster (USA)	13.06
—	Jack Pierce (USA)	13.06
4.	Colin Jackson (GBR)	13.09
5.	Tony Jarrett (GBR)	13.13

=== 400m hurdles ===
RANK	1991 WORLD BEST PERFORMERS	TIME
1.	Samuel Matete (ZAM)	47.10
2.	Danny Harris (USA)	47.38
3.	Winthrop Graham (JAM)	47.74
4.	Kevin Young (USA)	47.83
5.	Kriss Akabusi (GBR)	47.86

=== 3,000m steeplechase ===
RANK	1991 WORLD BEST PERFORMERS	TIME
1.	Moses Kiptanui (KEN)	8:06.46
2.	Philip Barkutwo (KEN)	8:08.39
3.	Mark Croghan (USA)	8:10.69
4.	Julius Kariuki (KEN)	8:11.28
5.	William Mutwol (KEN)	8:11.85

=== High jump ===
RANK	1991 WORLD BEST PERFORMERS	HEIGHT
1.	Javier Sotomayor (CUB)	2.40
1.	Charles Austin (USA)	2.40
3.	Hollis Conway (USA)	2.37
4.	Dalton Grant (GBR)	2.36
5.	Sorin Matei (ROM)	2.35
5.	Troy Kemp (BAH)	2.35

=== Long jump ===
RANK	1991 WORLD BEST PERFORMERS	DISTANCE
1.	Mike Powell (USA)	8.95
2.	Carl Lewis (USA)	8.87
3.	Larry Myricks (USA)	8.50
3.	Llewellyn Starks (USA)	8.50
5.	Gordon Laine (USA)	8.28

=== Triple jump ===
RANK	1991 WORLD BEST PERFORMERS	DISTANCE
1.	Kenny Harrison (USA)	17.78
2.	Leonid Voloshin (URS)	17.75
3.	Ralf Jaros (GER)	17.66
4.	Mike Conley (USA)	17.62
5.	Oleg Denishchik (URS)	17.53

=== Discus ===
RANK	1991 WORLD BEST PERFORMERS	DISTANCE
1.	Mike Buncic (USA)	69.36
2.	Erik de Bruin (NED)	68.12
3.	Adewale Olukoju (NGR)	67.80
4.	Lars Riedel (GER)	67.78
5.	Romas Ubartas (URS)	67.54

=== Shot put ===
RANK	1991 WORLD BEST PERFORMERS	DISTANCE
1.	Werner Günthör (SUI)	22.03
2.	Vyacheslav Lykho (URS)	20.77
3.	Lars-Arvid Nilsen (NOR)	20.75
4.	Saulius Kleiza (LTU)	20.67
5.	Sergey Smirnov (URS)	20.55

=== Hammer ===
RANK	1991 WORLD BEST PERFORMERS	DISTANCE
1.	Igor Astapkovich (URS)	84.26
2.	Andrey Abduvaliyev (URS)	82.80
3.	Yuriy Sedykh (URS)	82.62
4.	Plamen Minev (BUL)	82.40
5.	Sergey Alay (URS)	81.16

=== Javelin (new design) ===
RANK	1991 WORLD BEST PERFORMERS	DISTANCE
1.	Seppo Räty (FIN)	96.96
2.	Steve Backley (GBR)	91.36
3.	Raymond Hecht (GER)	90.84
4.	Kimmo Kinnunen (FIN)	90.82
5.	Jan Železný (CZE)	90.72

=== Pole vault ===
RANK	1991 WORLD BEST PERFORMERS	HEIGHT
1.	Sergey Bubka (URS)	6.10
2.	István Bagyula (HUN)	5.92
3.	Radion Gataullin (URS)	5.90
3.	Igor Potapovich (URS)	5.90
5.	Bill Payne (USA)	5.90

=== Decathlon ===
RANK	1991 WORLD BEST PERFORMERS	POINTS
1.	Dan O'Brien (USA)	8812
2.	Michael Smith (CAN)	8549
3.	Christian Plaziat (FRA)	8518
4.	Dave Johnson (USA)	8467
5.	Christian Schenk (GER)	8402

== Women's Best Year Performers ==
=== 60 metres ===
RANK	1991 WORLD BEST PERFORMERS	TIME
1.	Irina Privalova (URS)	7.02
2.	Merlene Ottey (JAM)	7.04
3.	Katrin Krabbe (GER)	7.06
4.	Liliana Allen (CUB)	7.12
5,	Gwen Torrence (USA)	7.13

=== 100 metres ===
RANK	1991 WORLD BEST PERFORMERS	TIME
1.	Merlene Ottey (JAM)	10.79
2.	Katrin Krabbe (GER)	10.91
3.	Carlette Guidry (USA)	10.94
4.	Gwen Torrence (USA)	10.96
4.	Marie-José Pérec (FRA)	10.96

=== 200 metres ===
RANK	1991 WORLD BEST PERFORMERS	TIME
1.	Merlene Ottey (JAM)	21.64
2.	Katrin Krabbe (GER)	21.96
3.	Gwen Torrence (USA)	22.07
4.	Irina Privalova (URS)	22.21
5.	Dannette Young (USA)	22.24

=== 400 metres ===
RANK	1991 WORLD BEST PERFORMERS	TIME
1.	Marie-José Pérec (FRA)	49.13
2.	Grit Breuer (GER)	49.42
3.	Ana Fidelia Quirot (CUB)	49.61
4.	Lillie Leatherwood (USA)	49.66
5.	Sandra Myers (ESP)	49.67

=== 800 metres ===
RANK	1991 WORLD BEST PERFORMERS	TIME
1.	Svetlana Masterkova (URS)	1:57.23
2.	Ana Fidelia Quirot (CUB)	1:57.34
3.	Liliya Nurutdinova (URS)	1:57.50
4.	Ella Kovacs (ROM)	1:57.58
5.	Maria de Lurdes Mutola (MOZ)	1:57.63

=== 1,500 metres ===
RANK	1991 WORLD BEST PERFORMERS	TIME
1.	Natalya Artyomova (URS)	3:59.16
2.	Hassiba Boulmerka (ALG)	4:00.00
3.	Doina Melinte (ROM)	4:00.83
4.	Violeta Szekely (ROM)	4:02.21
5.	Tatyana Dorovskikh (URS)	4:02.58

=== Mile ===
RANK	1991 WORLD BEST PERFORMERS	TIME
1.	Natalya Artyomova (URS)	4:17.00
2.	Hassiba Boulmerka (ALG)	4:20.79
3.	Doina Melinte (ROM)	4:22.04
4.	Mary Slaney (USA)	4:23.35
5.	Zola Pieterse (RSA)	4:23.38

=== 3,000 metres ===
RANK	1991 WORLD BEST PERFORMERS	TIME
1.	Elana Meyer (RSA)	8:32.00
2.	Zola Pieterse (RSA)	8:35.72
3.	Tatyana Dorovskikh (URS)	8:35.82
4.	Yvonne Murray (GBR)	8:36.05
5.	Yelena Romanova (URS)	8:36.06

=== 5,000 metres ===
RANK	1991 WORLD BEST PERFORMERS	TIME
1.	Elana Meyer (RSA)	14:49.35
2.	Kathrin Ullrich (GER)	14:58.71
3.	Yelena Romanova (URS)	14:59.70
4.	Susan Sirma (KEN)	15:03.52
5.	Uta Pippig (GER)	15:04.87

=== 10,000 metres ===
RANK	1991 WORLD BEST PERFORMERS	TIME
1.	Liz McColgan (GBR)	30:57.07
2.	Kathrin Ullrich (GER)	31:03.62
3.	Jill Hunter (GBR)	31:07.88
4.	Ingrid Kristiansen (NOR)	31:20.28
5.	Francie Larrieu-Smith (USA)	31:28.92

=== Half marathon ===
RANK	1991 WORLD BEST PERFORMERS	TIME
1.	Elana Meyer (RSA)	1:07:59 WR

=== Marathon ===
RANK	1991 WORLD BEST PERFORMERS	TIME
1.	Wanda Panfil (POL)	2:24:18
2.	Rosa Mota (POR)	2:26:14
3.	Kim Jones (USA)	2:26:40
4.	Uta Pippig (GER)	2:26:52
5.	Joan Benoit (USA)	2:26:54

=== 60m hurdles ===
RANK	1991 WORLD BEST PERFORMERS	TIME
1.	Ludmila Narozhilenko (URS)	7.82
1.	Monique Éwanjé-Épée (FRA)	7.82
3.	Mihaela Pogăcean (ROM)	7.88
4.	Anne Piquereau (FRA)	7.89
5.	Lidiya Yurkova (URS)	7.96

=== 100m hurdles ===
RANK	1991 WORLD BEST PERFORMERS	TIME
1.	Ludmila Narozhilenko (URS)	12.28
2.	Nataliya Grygoryeva (URS)	12.39
3.	Gail Devers (USA)	12.48
4.	Monique Éwanjé-Épée (FRA)	12.67
5.	Florence Colle (FRA)	12.73

=== 400m hurdles ===
RANK	1991 WORLD BEST PERFORMERS	TIME
1.	Tatyana Ledovskaya (URS)	53.11
2.	Sally Gunnell (GBR)	53.16
3.	Janeene Vickers (USA)	53.47
4.	Sandra Farmer-Patrick (USA)	53.54
5.	Kim Batten (USA)	53.98

=== High Jump ===
RANK	1991 WORLD BEST PERFORMERS	HEIGHT
1.	Heike Henkel (GER)	2.05 m
2.	Stefka Kostadinova (BUL)	2.03 m
3.	Inga Babakova (URS)	2.02 m
4.	Yelena Gulyayeva (URS)	1.99 m
5.	Svetlana Leseva (BUL)	1.98 m
5.	Yelena Yelesina (URS)	1.98 m

=== Long Jump ===
RANK	1991 WORLD BEST PERFORMERS	DISTANCE
1.	Heike Drechsler (GER)	7.37 m
2.	Jackie Joyner-Kersee (USA)	7.32 m
3.	Larisa Berezhnaya (URS)	7.24 m
4.	Yelena Sinchukova (URS)	7.20 m
5.	Susen Tiedtke (GER)	7.00 m

=== Triple Jump ===
RANK	1991 WORLD BEST PERFORMERS	DISTANCE
1.	Inessa Kravets (URS)	14.95 m
2.	Li Huirong (CHN)	14.42 m
3.	Yelena Semiraz (URS)	14.35 m
4.	Svetlana Davydova (URS)	13.84 m
5.	Octavia Iacob (ROM)	13.74 m

=== Shot put ===
RANK	1991 WORLD BEST PERFORMERS	DISTANCE
1.	Natalya Lisovskaya (URS)	21.12 m
2.	Huang Zhihong (CHN)	20.85 m
3.	Zhou Tianhua (CHN)	20.40 m
4.	Wang Wei (CHN)	19.58 m
5.	Li Xiaoyun (CHN)	19.47 m

=== Javelin (old design) ===
RANK	1991 WORLD BEST PERFORMERS	DISTANCE
1.	Trine Hattestad (NOR)	71.44
2.	Karen Forkel (GER)	70.20
3.	Petra Meier (GER)	69.66
4.	Xu Demei (CHN)	68.78
5.	Silke Renk (GER)	68.34

=== Heptathlon ===
RANK	1991 WORLD BEST PERFORMERS	POINTS
1.	Jackie Joyner-Kersee (USA)	6878
2.	Sabine Braun (GER)	6672
3.	Peggy Beer (GER)	6494
4.	Liliana Nastase (ROM)	6493
5.	Irina Belova (URS)	6448

== Births ==
- January 15 — Darya Klishina, Russian long jumper
- February 8 — Genzebe Dibaba, Ethiopian middle- and long-distance runner
- February 22 — Rebecca Cheptegei, Ugandan distance runner (d. 2024)
- May 8 — Kalkidan Gezahegne, Ethiopian distance runner

== Deaths ==
- January 1 — Inga Gentzel (82), Swedish athlete (b. 1908)
- August 10 — Ellen Braumüller (80), German athlete (b. 1910)
