= Athletics at the 1988 Summer Olympics – Women's 3000 metres =

Women's 3000 metres at the Games of the XXIV Olympiad
- Venue: Olympic Stadium
- Dates: 23 September 1988 (heats); 25 September 1988 (final)
- Competitors: 35 from 25 nations
- Winning time: 8:26.53 OR

Medalists
1st place, gold medalist(s)		Tetyana Samolenko; Soviet Union
2nd place, silver medalist(s)		Paula Ivan; Romania
3rd place, bronze medalist(s)		Yvonne Murray; Great Britain

The women's 3000 metres at the 1988 Summer Olympics in Seoul, South Korea had an entry list of 35 competitors, with two qualifying heats (35) before the final (15) took place on Sunday September 25, 1988.

The winning margin was 0.62 seconds which was the only time the women's 3,000 metres was won by less than 0.8 seconds at the Olympics.

== Final ==
RANK	FINAL	TIME
	Tetyana Samolenko (URS)	8:26.53
	Paula Ivan (ROU)	8:27.15
	Yvonne Murray (GBR)	8:29.02
4.	Yelena Romanova (URS)	8:30.45
5.	Natalya Artyomova (URS)	8:31.67
6.	Vicki Huber (USA)	8:37.25
7.	Wendy Sly (GBR)	8:37.70
8.	Lynn Williams (CAN)	8:38.43
9.	Elly van Hulst (NED)	8:43.92
10.	Mary Slaney (USA)	8:47.13
11.	Cornelia Bürki (SUI)	8:48.32
12.	Annette Sergent (FRA)	8:49.14
13.	PattiSue Plumer (USA)	8:59.17
14.	Angela Chalmers (CAN)	9:04.75
15.	Debbie Bowker (CAN)	9:11.95

== Qualifying heats ==
RANK	HEAT	QUALIFYING	TIME
1.	2	Paula Ivan (ROU)	8:43.10
2.	2	Yvonne Murray (GBR)	8:43.73
3.	2	Debbie Bowker (CAN)	8:43.81
4.	2	Mary Slaney (USA)	8:44.15
5.	2	Tetyana Samolenko (URS)	8:44.18
6.	2	Natalya Artyomova (URS)	8:44.30
7.	2	PattiSue Plumer (USA)	8:45.21
8.	2	Annette Sergent (FRA)	8:45.94
9.	2	Cornelia Bürki (SUI)	8:48.37
10.	1	Yelena Romanova (URS)	8:48.47
11.	1	Elly van Hulst (NED)	8:48.54
12.	1	Angela Chalmers (CAN)	8:48.60
13.	1	Lynn Williams (CAN)	8:48.70
14.	1	Vicki Huber (USA)	8:48.93
15.	1	Wendy Sly (GBR)	8:49.71
16.	2	Vera Michallek (FRG)	8:51.34
17.	2	Chen Qingmei (CHN)	8:51.53
18.	2	Roberta Brunet (ITA)	8:53.04
19.	1	Xiuting Wang (CHN)	8:54.19
20.	1	Jill Hunter (GBR)	8:57.28
21.	1	Christine Pfitzinger (NZL)	9:01.30
22.	1	Jacqueline Perkins (AUS)	9:01.82
23.	1	Andri Avraam (CYP)	9:02.18
24.	2	Anne Keenan-Buckley (IRL)	9:03.10
25.	1	Angelines Rodríguez (ESP)	9:03.39
26.	1	Fernanda Ribeiro (POR)	9:05.92
27.	1	Susan Sirma (KEN)	9:06.90
28.	1	Lim Chun-Ae (KOR)	9:21.18
29.	2	Khin Khin Htwe (BIR)	9:26.57
30.	2	Daphrose Nyiramutuzo (RWA)	9:47.98
31.	2	Dikanda Diba (ZAI)	10:32.88
–	1	Maricica Puică (ROU)	DNF
–	1	Marie Pierre Duros (FRA)	DNF
–	2	Fatima Aouam (MAR)	DNF
–	2	Polonie Avek (PNG)	DNF

== See also ==
- 1987 Women's World Championships 3.000 metres (Rome)
- 1990 Women's European Championships 3.000 metres (Split)
- 1991 Women's World Championships 3.000 metres (Tokyo)
- 1992 Women's Olympic 3.000 metres (Barcelona)
