= Shelly Steely =

American athlete (born 1962)

Personal information
- Nickname: "Shelly"
- Nationality: United States
- Born: Anne Rochelle Steely; October 23, 1962 (age 63) Reading, Pennsylvania
- Height: 121 lb (55 kg)
- Weight: 5 ft 7 in (1.70 m)

Sport
- Sport: Track and field
- Events: Cross country running, 10,000 meters, 5,000 meters, 3,000 meters, 1,500 meters
- College team: University of Florida
- Club: Mizuno Track Club
Medal record
Women's athletics
Representing the United States
World Cross Country Championships
Gold medal – first place	1985 Lisbon	Team long race

Anne Rochelle Steely Ramirez (born October 23, 1962), née Anne Rochelle Steely, is a former long-distance runner who competed internationally for the United States. She specialized in the 3,000 meters on the track and later competed in road running events.

She made her international debut in cross country and helped the United States the women's team title at the IAAF World Cross Country Championships in 1985. Her focus changed to the 3,000 meters, a distance in which she was a two-time US champion (outdoors in 1991 and indoors in 1992). She reached the final of that event at the 1991 World Championships in Athletics and the 1992 Barcelona Olympics.

Steely's performances deteriorated and she was diagnosed with hyperthyroidism. However, she made an athletic comeback in 1998 and she won two national road titles, as well as appearing at the Goodwill Games and IAAF World Half Marathon Championships that year. She made one more appearance at the World Half Marathon event in 2000, but retired to focus on education studies.

== Career ==
=== Early life and college career ===
Steely was born in Reading, Pennsylvania, and attended Bishop Conwell High School in Levittown, Pennsylvania. She received an athletic scholarship to attend the University of Florida in Gainesville, Florida, where she ran for the Florida Gators track and field team in National Collegiate Athletic Association (NCAA) competition. Steely was fifth in the 10,000 meters at the NCAA Outdoors in 1983, but found greater success over shorter distances the following year: she won both the 5000 meters and 3000 meters Southeastern Conference (SEC) titles. She was third in the 3,000 meters at the 1984 NCAA Outdoors and made two podium finishes at the USA Outdoor Track and Field Championships (third over 5,000 meters, second over 3,000 meters). She also reached the semi-finals of the US Olympic Track and Field Trials that year.

In her final year at Florida, she took a sweep of the SEC long-distance titles, winning the 3,000, 5,000 and 10,000-meter distance races. During her time as a Gator runner, she won five All-American honors and nine All-SEC honors, and was later inducted into the University of Florida Athletic Hall of Fame as a "Gator Great" in 2006.

Steely made her international debut for the United States in 1985, and her fifteenth-place finish at the 1985 IAAF World Cross Country Championships helped the American women (including Cathy Branta and Betty Springs) to the long race team title. She made two more appearances at that competition, taking part in the 1989 and 1990 editions. She also competed on the international cross country circuit in Europe, including a win at the Cross Internacional de Venta de Baños.

=== World and Olympic competition ===
She began training in New Mexico and improved her best times in the 3,000 and 5,000 meters in 1990, and was ranked highly at the national level. She began to expand her oeuvre to include road running and that year she took wins at the Cooper River Bridge Run and Great Cow Harbor 10K races, as well as shorter distance wins at the Fifth Season Race and the Jean Bouin Memorial in Spain. The following year saw her make a career breakthrough on the track. She won the national title in the 3,000 meters with a significant personal best run of 8:49.00 minutes. This gained her a place on the national team for the 1991 World Championships in Athletics. Steely ran a personal record of 8:48.54 minutes in the qualifying rounds, only finishing behind two eventual medalists (Susan Sirma and Yelena Romanova). She did not perform as well in the final, however, and ended the competition in fourteenth place. She ended her season with road wins at the Phoenix 10K and Senior Bowl 10K.

She claimed her second national title at the start of the following year, winning the 3,000 meters at the USA Indoor Track and Field Championships with a time of 8:51.29 minutes. A third title followed on the roads that May as she took the 5,000 meters U.S. title in Cedar Rapids, Iowa. In the outdoor season she ran a career best time of 8:41.28 minutes for the 3,000 meters and her runner-up placing at the Olympic Trials saw her make the US Olympic Team for the first time. At the 1992 Barcelona Olympics, both Steely and PattiSue Plumer (the trials winner) made the event final and Steely came seventh, two spots behind her compatriot.

=== Switch to roads and retirement ===
She won the Carlsbad 5000 the following March. Steely was the 1993 USA Outdoor runner-up in the 3,000 meters but was replaced in the national team for the 1993 World Championships in Athletics. Her performances waned over the next three years and she did not compete at all in 1996. She was later diagnosed with a hyperthyroid condition.

Steely returned to compete in 1998 and ran frequently, mainly out of necessity as she no longer had a sponsor. She was in the top three at the 1998 USA Outdoors in the 10,000 meters, came fourth in the event at the 1998 Goodwill Games, and ranked second nationally in the distance that year. She won the US titles in the 25-kilometer and 10-mile events that year, as well as runner-up placing in the national 12-kilometer and half marathon events. Her performance over the latter distance gained her a spot at the 1998 IAAF World Half Marathon Championships, where she placed 42nd overall.

She ran in the 10,000 meters at the 1999 USA Outdoor Championships (coming fifth) and competed at the 2000 IAAF World Half Marathon Championships. However, she moved on from her athletic career to focus on obtaining an Educational specialist degree.

== Personal bests ==
- 1500 m – 4:05.07 mins (1992)
- 3000 m – 8:41.28 mins (1992)
- 5000 m – 15:08.67 mins (1992)
- 10,000 m – 32:41.14 mins (1990)
- Half marathon – 1:13:33 hrs (1998)

== International competition record ==
Year	Competition	Venue	Position	Notes
1985	World Cross Country Championships	Lisbon, Portugal	15th	Long race
1985	World Cross Country Championships	Lisbon, Portugal	1st	Team race
1989	World Cross Country Championships	Stavanger, Norway	86th	Long race
1990	World Cross Country Championships	Aix-les-Bains, France	44th	Long race
1991	World Championships	Tokyo, Japan	14th	3000 m
1992	Olympic Games	Barcelona, Spain	7th	3000 m
1998	Goodwill Games	Uniondale, United States	4th	10,000 m
1998	World Half Marathon Championships	Uster, Switzerland	42nd	Half marathon
2000	World Half Marathon Championships	Veracruz, Mexico	35th	Mexico

== See also ==
- Florida Gators
- List of University of Florida alumni
- List of University of Florida Athletic Hall of Fame members
- List of University of Florida Olympians
