= 1990 European Athletics Championships – Women's 3000 metres =

Women's 3000 metres at the European Athletics Championships

These are the official results of the Women's 3000 metres event at the 1990 European Championships in Split, Yugoslavia, held at Stadion Poljud on 27 and 29 August 1990.

== Medalists ==
Gold	Yvonne Murray; United Kingdom
Silver	Yelena Romanova; Soviet Union
Bronze	Roberta Brunet; Italy

== Final ==
Rank	Final	Time
	Yvonne Murray (GBR)	8:43.06
	Yelena Romanova (URS)	8:43.68
	Roberta Brunet (ITA)	8:46:19
4.	Lyubov Kremlyova (URS)	8:46:94
5.	Margareta Keszeg (ROM)	8:48:04
6.	Päivi Tikkanen (FIN)	8:50:26
7.	Zita Ágoston (HUN)	8:51:07
8.	Sonia McGeorge (GBR)	8:51:33
9.	Gitte Karlshøj (DEN)	8:51:44
10.	Alison Wyeth (GBR)	8:52:26
11.	Sonia O'Sullivan (IRL)	8:52:65
12.	Martine Fays (FRA)	8:56:36
13.	Roisin Smyth (IRL)	9:00:87
—	Marie-Pierre Duros (FRA)	DNF

== Heats ==
Rank	Heat 1	Time
1.	Yelena Romanova (URS)	8:52.92
2.	Lyubov Kremlyova (URS)	8:53.81
3.	Roberta Brunet (ITA)	8:54.34
4.	Gitte Karlshøj (DEN)	8:54.46
5.	Sonia O'Sullivan (IRL)	8:55.12
6.	Sonia McGeorge (GBR)	8:55.00
7.	Martine Fays (FRA)	8:59.96
8.	Jana Kuceriková (TCH)	9:04.40
9.	Fernanda Ribeiro (POR)	9:11.39
10.	Alice Silva (POR)	9:16.75
11.	Andri Avraam (CYP)	9:22.66
—	Snežana Pajkić (YUG)	DNF

Rank	Heat 2	Time
1.	Yvonne Murray (GBR)	8:57.25
2.	Margareta Keszeg (ROM)	8:57.42
3.	Päivi Tikkanen (FIN)	8:57.84
4.	Alison Wyeth (GBR)	8:58.31
5.	Zita Ágoston (HUN)	8:58.41
6.	Marie-Pierre Duros (FRA)	8:59.95
7.	Roisin Smyth (IRL)	9:01.06
8.	Elly van Hulst (NED)	9:01.73
9.	Estela Estévez (ESP)	9:05.25
10.	Aurora Cunha (POR)	9:06.88
11.	Valerie McGovern (IRL)	9:14.39

== Participation ==
According to an unofficial count, 23 athletes from 15 countries participated in the event.

- Cyprus (1)
- Czechoslovakia (1)
- Denmark (1)
- Finland (1)
- France (2)
- Hungary (1)
- Ireland (3)
- Italy (1)
- Netherlands (1)
- Portugal (3)
- Romania (1)
- Soviet Union (2)
- Spain (1)
- United Kingdom (3)
- Yugoslavia (1)

== See also ==
- 1986 Women's European Championships 3,000 metres (Stuttgart)
- 1987 Women's World Championships 3,000 metres (Rome)
- 1988 Women's Olympic 3,000 metres (Seoul)
- 1991 Women's World Championships 3,000 metres (Tokyo)
- 1992 Women's Olympic 3,000 metres (Barcelona)
- 1993 Women's World Championships 3,000 metres (Stuttgart)
- 1994 Women's European Championships 3,000 metres (Helsinki)
