= 1990 European Athletics Indoor Championships – Women's 3000 metres =

The women's 3000 metres event at the 1990 European Athletics Indoor Championships was held in Kelvin Hall on 3 March.

== Results ==
| Rank | Name | Nationality | Time | Notes |
|---|---|---|---|---|
| 1st place, gold medalist(s) | Elly van Hulst | Netherlands | 8:57.28 | |
| 2nd place, silver medalist(s) | Margareta Keszeg | Romania | 8:57.50 | |
| 3rd place, bronze medalist(s) | Andrea Hahmann | East Germany | 9:00.31 | |
| 4 | Viorica Ghican | Romania | 9:00.92 | |
| 5 | Roisin Smyth | Ireland | 9:04.42 | |
| 6 | Eva Jurková | Czechoslovakia | 9:06.76 | |
| 7 | Valentina Tauceri | Italy | 9:11.20 | |
| 8 | Sonia McGeorge | Great Britain | 9:11.60 | |
| 9 | Tanja Merchiers | Belgium | 9:16.74 | |
| | Karen Hutcheson | Great Britain | DNF | |
| | Tullia Mancia | Italy | DQ | |
