= Athletics at the 1992 Summer Olympics – Women's 3000 metres =

Women's 3000 metres at the Games of the XXV Olympiad
- Venue: Estadi Olímpic de Montjuïc
- Dates: 31 July 1992 (heats); 2 August 1992 (final)
- Competitors: 33 from 21 nations
- Winning time: 8:46.04

Medalists
1st place, gold medalist(s)		Yelena Romanova; Unified Team
2nd place, silver medalist(s)		Tetyana Dorovskikh; Unified Team
3rd place, bronze medalist(s)		Angela Chalmers; Canada

These are the official results of the women's 3000 metres event at the 1992 Summer Olympics in Barcelona, Spain. There were a total of 34 participating athletes, with three qualifying heats.

== Medalists ==
Gold	Yelena Romanova; Unified Team
Silver	Tetyana Dorovskikh; Unified Team
Bronze	Angela Chalmers; Canada

== Records ==
These were the standing world and Olympic records (in minutes) prior to the 1992 Summer Olympics.

World record	8:22.26	(Soviet Union) Tatyana Kazankina	Leningrad (URS)	August 26, 1984
Olympic record	8:26.53	(Soviet Union) Tetyana Samolenko	Seoul (KOR)	September 25, 1988

Tetyana Samolenko competes in this event after her marriage under the name Tetyana Dorovskikh.

== Final ==
RANK	FINAL	TIME
	Yelena Romanova (EUN)	8:46.04
	Tetyana Dorovskikh (EUN)	8:46.85
	Angela Chalmers (CAN)	8:47.22
4.	Sonia O'Sullivan (IRL)	8:47.41
5.	PattiSue Plumer (USA)	8:48.29
6.	Yelena Kopytova (EUN)	8:49.55
7.	Shelly Steely (USA)	8:52.67
8.	Yvonne Murray (GBR)	8:55.85
9.	Alison Wyeth (GBR)	9:00.23
10.	Roberta Brunet (ITA)	9:01.26
11.	Margareta Keszeg (ROM)	9:03.16
—	Marie Pierre Duros (FRA)	DNF

== Qualifying heats ==
RANK	HEAT 1	TIME
1.	Yelena Kopytova (EUN)	8:47.21
2.	Margareta Keszeg (ROM)	8:47.24
3.	PattiSue Plumer (USA)	8:47.58
4.	Lisa York (GBR)	8:47.71
5.	Robyn Meagher (CAN)	8:49.72
6.	Gitte Karlshøj (DEN)	8:54.05
7.	Estela Estévez (ESP)	8:55.70
8.	Jane Ngotho (KEN)	9:00.96
9.	Zola Pieterse (RSA)	9:07.10
10.	Ana Isabel Elias (ANG)	9:58.82
—	Sandra Cortez (BOL)	DNS

RANK	HEAT 2	TIME
1.	Marie Pierre Duros (FRA)	8:42.32
2.	Tatyana Dorovskikh (EUN)	8:42.45
3.	Angela Chalmers (CAN)	8:42.85
4.	Alison Wyeth (GBR)	8:43.93
5.	Roberta Brunet (ITA)	8:44.21
6.	Shelly Steely (USA)	8:44.22
7.	Esther Kiplagat (KEN)	8:44.97
8.	Catherina McKiernan (IRL)	8:57.91
9.	Fernanda Ribeiro (POR)	9:07.69
10.	Inmaculle Naberaho (RWA)	10:02.62
11.	Rosemary Turare (PNG)	11:15.18

RANK	HEAT 3	TIME
1.	Sonia O'Sullivan (IRL)	8:50.08
2.	Yvonne Murray (GBR)	8:51.16
3.	Yelena Romanova (EUN)	8:51.18
4.	Annette Peters (USA)	8:52.77
5.	Zohra Graziani-Koullou (FRA)	8:55.21
6.	Päivi Tikkanen (FIN)	8:59.60
7.	Krishna Stanton (AUS)	9:00.62
8.	Pauline Konga (KEN)	9:02.79
9.	Leah Pells (CAN)	9:13.19
10.	Khin Khin Htwe (MYA)	9:31.70
11.	Janeth Caizalitín (ECU)	9:32.39
12.	Mirsada Burić (BIH)	10:03.34

== See also ==
- 1990 Women's European Championships 3000 metres (Split)
- 1991 Women's World Championships 3000 metres (Tokyo)
- 1993 Women's World Championships 3000 metres (Stuttgart)
- 1994 Women's European Championships 3000 metres (Helsinki)
- 1995 Women's World Championships 5000 metres (Gothenburg)
