= Marie-Pierre Duros =

French middle-distance runner (born 1967)

Medal record

Women's athletics

Representing France

IAAF World Indoor Championships
Gold medal – first place	1991 Seville	3000 m

Marie-Pierre Duros (born 7 June 1967) is a French former middle- and long-distance runner who specialised in the 3000 metres. Her personal best of 8:38.97 minutes for the event is a former French record, which lasted from 1989 to 1999. She was a two-time Olympian (1988 and 1992) and three times participant at the World Championships in Athletics (1987, 1991, 1995).

Her greatest achievement was a gold medal 1991 IAAF World Indoor Championships, where she became France's first champion of the competition's history. She also won medals in cross country running with the French women's team, taking bronze at the IAAF World Cross Country Championships in 1988 and silver the following year. She was a six-time national champion: four times over 3000 m and once over 1500 metres and cross country.

== Career ==
=== Early career ===
Born in Saint-Brieuc, she competed in running competitions at a young age and won her first international medal at the 1985 European Athletics Junior Championships, taking the 1500 metres silver medal behind Ana Padurean (who won the world junior title a year later). She made her first impression at senior level two years later by winning the 3000 metres title at the French Athletics Championships – her run of 8:56.18 minutes was the first time a woman had dipped under nine minutes at the competition. Her senior global debut followed at the 1987 World Championships in Athletics a month later and she placed 14th overall in the event. She ended that year with a win at the Cross Du Figaro.

=== First senior medals ===
Duros won her first senior medal at the 1988 IAAF World Cross Country Championships. In an Annette Sergent-led team, she helped the French women to the bronze team medals through her eleventh-place finish in the women's long race. On the track she repeated her win at the national championships and gained selection for France at the 1988 Summer Olympics. However, her first Olympic appearance was not a successful one, as she failed to finish in the 3000 metres heats.

Duros returned to grass at the beginning of 1989 and was the winner at the Cross Ouest-France. Her finish in the senior race at the 1989 IAAF World Cross Country Championships was lower than the previous year's (she ended in 32nd place), but a strong French team topped by world champion Sergent, Martine Fays and Maria Lelut took the silver medals in the team competition. Individual success came on the track as she came third in the 3000 m at the Athletissima meeting before going on to set a new French record of 8:38.97 minutes for the distance in Nice. This mark stood as the national record for nearly a decade and placed her third in the world rankings that year, behind Paula Ivan and Yvonne Murray. In addition to this, she had middle-distance success with a national title over 1500 m and a win over that distance at the European Cup "B" Final.

=== World indoor champion and 1992 Olympics ===
A outing at the 1990 European Athletics Championships saw her pass the 3000 m heats, but fail to finish the distance in the final. This was her only appearance at the European event. She had a win at the Cross Du Figaro in December that year. Another French record came for Duros in February 1991, when she ran an indoor 3000 m best of 8:53.94 minutes. She won the French cross country title at the start of March and this proved good preparation for the 1991 IAAF World Indoor Championships held the weekend after. Duros outran the competition and won the world indoor title for the 3000 m in an improved French indoor record time of 8:50.69 minutes. She was France's first ever gold medallist at the competition proper (Gérard Lelièvre won at the precursor 1985 IAAF World Indoor Games). In the outdoor season she won the French title and also won at the DN Galan in Stockholm – her time of 8:40.76 minutes ranked her eighth globally that year. She failed to carry this form into the final at the 1991 World Championships in Athletics, however, coming last in the final by a margin of over 15 seconds. She had her third and final career win at the Cross Du Figaro at the end of the year.

The 1992 season was her last as a contender at international level. She came 29th at the 1992 IAAF World Cross Country Championships (the declining French women were ninth in the team rankings). She won a fourth and final national title over 3000 m, and a run of 8:40.38 minutes in Nice (the second fastest of her career) placed her sixth in the year's world rankings. This brought her selection for the 1992 Barcelona Olympics. There she opened with one of her best international performances by running a time of 8:42.32 minutes to qualify as the fastest of the heats stage. She did not replicate this in the final and dropped out before completing 3000 m (her second consecutive Olympic failure to finish). She was also entered in the 1500 m competition and had the best time of her career for that distance in the heats (4:10.14 minutes). She was well off this pace in the semi-finals, finishing dead last in her race.

Duros did not compete at a high level after that point with the sole exception of the first ever global 5000 metres held at the 1995 World Championships in Athletics. Aged 28, this was her last major competition and she was the second slowest finisher in the race.

She is now married to fellow runner Pierre Toudret and supports younger athletes through UA Langueux, a local running club.

== Personal bests ==
- 1500 metres – 4:10.14 min (1992)
- 3000 metres outdoor – 8:38.97 min (1989)
- 3000 metres indoor – 8:50.69 min (1991)
- 5000 metres – 16:48.66 min (1995)

== National titles ==
- French Athletics Championships:
  - 1500 metres: 1989
  - 3000 metres: 1987, 1988, 1991, 1992
- French Cross Country Championships: 1991

== International competitions ==
Year	Competition	Venue	Position	Event	Notes
1985	European Junior Championships	Cottbus, East Germany	2nd	1500 metres	
1987	World Championships	Rome, Italy	14th	3000 metres	
1988	World Cross Country Championships	Auckland, New Zealand	11th	Senior race	
1988	World Cross Country Championships	Auckland, New Zealand	3rd	Senior team	
1988	Olympic Games	Seoul, South Korea	—	3000 metres	DNF (heat)
1989	World Cross Country Championships	Stavanger, Norway	32nd	Senior race	
1989	World Cross Country Championships	Stavanger, Norway	2nd	Senior team	
1990	European Championships	Split, Yugoslavia	—	3000 metres	DNF (final)
1991	World Indoor Championships	Seville, Spain	1st	3000 metres	
1991	World Championships	Tokyo, Japan	15th	3000 metres	
1992	World Cross Country Championships	Boston, United States	29th	Senior race	
1992	World Cross Country Championships	Boston, United States	9th	Senior team	
1992	Olympic Games	Barcelona, Spain	13th (semis)	1500 metres	
1992	Olympic Games	Barcelona, Spain	—	3000 metres	DNF (final)
1995	World Championships	Gothenburg, Sweden	40th (heats)	5000 metres	
