= Róisín Smyth =

Personal information
- Born: 26 October 1963 (age 63) County Londonderry, Northern Ireland

Sport
- Sport: Track and field
Medal record
Representing Ireland
Mallusk Crosscountry
Bronze medal – third place	1984	Women's race
Gold medal – first place	1991	Women's race

Róisín Smyth (also known as Roisin Smyth) (born 26 October 1963) is a middle-distance runner from County Londonderry in Northern Ireland. Her focus areas were cross-country and 3,000 m on the track. She competed in the 3000 m heats at the 1984 Summer Olympics, the 1991 World Championships as well as at six World Cross Country championships. She was all-Ireland 3000 m champion on three occasions, and once at 1500 m. Smyth competed in the World Cross Country Championships for both Northern Ireland and Ireland.

== International competitions ==
Year	Competition	Venue	Position	Event	Notes
Representing Ireland or Northern Ireland
1980	IAAF World Cross Country Championships	Paris, France	101st	Senior women's race	Northern Ireland
1980	IAAF World Cross Country Championships	Paris, France	17th	Women's team result	Northern Ireland
1984	IAAF World Cross Country Championships	East Rutherford, United States	22nd	Senior women's race	Ireland
1984	IAAF World Cross Country Championships	East Rutherford, United States	4th	Women's team result	Ireland
1984	Summer Olympics	Los Angeles, United States	heat	3,000 metres	Ireland
1986	European Athletics Indoor Championships	Madrid, Spain	7th	1500 m	Ireland
1988	IAAF World Cross Country Championships	Auckland, New Zealand	112th	Senior women's race	Ireland
1988	IAAF World Cross Country Championships	Auckland, New Zealand	17th	Women's team result	Ireland
1989	IAAF World Cross Country Championships	Stavanger, Norway	78th	Senior women's race	Ireland
1989	IAAF World Cross Country Championships	Stavanger, Norway	15th	Women's team result	Ireland
1990	IAAF World Cross Country Championships	Aix-les-Bains, France	68th	Senior women's race	Ireland
1990	IAAF World Cross Country Championships	Aix-les-Bains, France	17th	Women's team result	Ireland
1990	European Athletics Indoor Championships	Glasgow, UK	5th	3000 m	Ireland
1990	European Athletics Championships	Split, Yugoslavia	13th	3000 m	Ireland
1991	IAAF World Cross Country Championships	Antwerp, Belgium	111th	Senior women's race	Ireland
1991	IAAF World Cross Country Championships	Antwerp, Belgium	19th	Women's team race	Ireland
1991	World Championships	Tokyo, Japan	heat	3000 m	Ireland

== Personal life ==
Smyth is married to Enda Fitzpatrick. He is a fellow world cross country athlete and is the director of Dublin City University's sports academy. They have two daughters, both of whom are accomplished athletes at national level.
