= 1992 European Athletics Indoor Championships – Women's 3000 metres =

The women's 3000 metres event at the 1992 European Athletics Indoor Championships was held in Palasport di Genova on 1 March.

== Results ==
Rank	Name	Nationality	Time	Notes
1st place, gold medalist(s)	Margareta Keszeg	Romania	8:59.80	
2nd place, silver medalist(s)	Tetyana Dorovskikh	Unified Team	9:00.15	
3rd place, bronze medalist(s)	Rita Marquard	Germany	9:00.99	
4	Yelena Vyazova	Unified Team	9:01.25	
5	Elly van Hulst	Netherlands	9:02.85	
6	Christina Mai	Germany	9:03.27	
7	Maria Guida	Italy	9:07.70	
8	Cristina Agusti	Spain	9:09.15	
