= 1986 European Athletics Indoor Championships – Women's 1500 metres =

The Women's 1500 metres event at the 1986 European Athletics Indoor Championships was held on 23 February.

== Results ==
Rank	Name	Nationality	Time	Notes
1st place, gold medalist(s)	Svetlana Kitova	Soviet Union	4:14.25	
2nd place, silver medalist(s)	Tatyana Lebonda	Soviet Union	4:14.29	
3rd place, bronze medalist(s)	Mitica Junghiatu	Romania	4:15.00	
4	Elly van Hulst	Netherlands	4:16.21	
5	Mary McKenna	Ireland	4:20.82	
6	Asuncion Sinobas	Spain	4:23.16	
7	Roisin Smyth	Ireland	4:23.84	
8	Agnese Possamai	Italy	4:24.57	
	Margareta Keszeg	Romania	DNS	
