= Athletics at the 1994 Commonwealth Games – Women's 10,000 metres =

Women's 10,000 metres at the Commonwealth Games

The women's 10,000 metres event at the 1994 Commonwealth Games was held in Victoria, British Columbia

== Results ==
Rank	Name	Nationality	Time	Notes
1st place, gold medalist(s)	Yvonne Murray	Scotland	31:56.97	
2nd place, silver medalist(s)	Elana Meyer	South Africa	32:06.02	
3rd place, bronze medalist(s)	Jane Omoro	Kenya	32:13.01	
4	Suzanne Rigg	England	33:01.40	
5	Vikki McPherson	Scotland	33:02.74	
6	Ulla Marquette	Canada	33:16.29	
7	Michelle Dillon	Australia	33:19.01	
8	Anne Hare	New Zealand	33:19.66	
9	Lioudmila Alexeeff	Canada	33:33.59	
10	Angie Hulley	England	33:45.04	
11	Krishna Stanton	Australia	33:50.14	
12	Palaniappan Jayanthi	Malaysia	34:23.71	
13	Zahara Hyde	England	34:43.24	
14	Jebiwot Keitany	Kenya	35:10.51	
	Carol Montgomery	Canada	DNF	
	Jackline Okemwa	Kenya	DNS	
	Hawa Hamis Hussein	Tanzania	DNS	
