= Chen Qingmei =

Chinese long-distance runner

Personal information
- Nationality: Chinese
- Born: 4 April 1963 (age 62)

Sport
- Sport: Long-distance running
- Event: 3000 metres

Chen Qingmei (born 4 April 1963) is a Chinese long-distance runner. She competed in the women's 3000 metres at the 1988 Summer Olympics.
