= 1993 IAAF World Indoor Championships – Women's 3000 metres =

The women's 3,000 metres event at the 1993 IAAF World Indoor Championships was held on 13 March 1993.

The winning margin was a colossal 12.34 seconds which as of July 2024 remains the only time the women's 3,000 metres has been won by more than seven seconds at these championships.

== Results ==
Rank	Name	Nationality	Time	Notes
1st place, gold medalist(s)	Yvonne Murray	Great Britain	8:50.55	
2nd place, silver medalist(s)	Margareta Keszeg	Romania	9:02.89	
3rd place, bronze medalist(s)	Lynn Jennings	United States	9:03.78	
4	Christina Mai	Germany	9:04.14	
5	Ulla Marquette	Canada	9:04.72	
6	Elly van Hulst	Netherlands	9:08.33	
7	Marina Bastos	Portugal	9:13.13	
8	Kathy Franey	United States	9:13.16	
9	Alejandra Ramos	Chile	9:15.22	NR
10	Natalia Azpiazu	Spain	9:23.50	
11	Geraldine Hendricken	Ireland	9:27.69	
12	Olga Kovpotina	Russia	9:31.26	
