= 1991 IAAF World Indoor Championships – Women's 3000 metres =

The women's 3000 metres event at the 1991 IAAF World Indoor Championships was held on 9 March.

== Results ==
Rank	Name	Nationality	Time	Notes
1st place, gold medalist(s)	Marie-Pierre Duros	France	8:50.69	NR
2nd place, silver medalist(s)	Margareta Keszeg	Romania	8:51.51	
3rd place, bronze medalist(s)	Lyubov Kremlyova	Soviet Union	8:51.90	PB
4	Albertina Dias	Portugal	8:55.45	NR
5	Carita Sunell	Finland	8:56.11	NR
6	Rosario Murcia	France	8:56.20	PB
7	Sonia McGeorge	Great Britain	8:56.67	PB
8	Elaine Van Blunk	United States	8:58.23	PB
9	Elly van Hulst	Netherlands	9:05.16	
	Christina Mai	Germany	DQ	
