= Angelines Rodríguez =

Spanish long-distance runner

Personal information
- Full name: Angelines Rodríguez Alcalde
- Nationality: Spanish
- Born: 24 September 1969 (age 56)

Sport
- Sport: Long-distance running
- Event: 3000 metres

Angelines Rodríguez Alcalde (born 24 September 1969) is a Spanish long-distance runner. She competed in the women's 3000 metres at the 1988 Summer Olympics held in Seoul, South Korea.
