= Annette Peters =

American long-distance runner

Personal information
- Born: May 31, 1965 (age 61) Reno, Nevada, United States

Sport
- Sport: Long-distance running
- Event: 3000 metres

Annette Renée Peters (née Hand; born May 31, 1965) is an American long-distance runner. She competed in the women's 3000 metres at the 1992 Summer Olympics. She was a four-time participant at the IAAF World Cross Country Championships and a three-time participant at the World Championships in Athletics. She was the 3000-meter run bronze medalist at the 1994 Goodwill Games.

She competed for the Oregon Ducks from 1984 to 1988.
