= Ana Isabel Elias =

Angolan middle-distance runner

Personal information
- Nationality: Angolan
- Born: 17 September 1965 (age 60)

Sport
- Sport: Middle-distance running
- Event: 1500 metres

Ana Isabel Elias (born 17 September 1965) is an Angolan middle-distance runner. She competed in the women's 1500 metres at the 1992 Summer Olympics.
