= Yvonne Murray =

Scottish athlete (born 1964)

Yvonne Murray MBE
Personal information
- Born: 4 October 1964 (age 61) Musselburgh, East Lothian, Scotland
Medal record
Women's Athletics
Representing Great Britain
Olympic Games
Bronze medal – third place	1988 Seoul	3,000 m
World Indoor Championships
Gold medal – first place	1993 Toronto	3000 m
World Cup
Gold medal – first place	1989 Barcelona	3000 m
Gold medal – first place	1994 London	3000 m
European Championships
Gold medal – first place	1990 Split	3000 m
Silver medal – second place	1994 Helsinki	3000 m
Bronze medal – third place	1986 Stuttgart	3000 m
European Indoor Championships
Gold medal – first place	1987 Lievin	3000 m
Silver medal – second place	1986 Madrid	3000 m
Bronze medal – third place	1985 Piraeus	3000 m
Representing Scotland
Commonwealth Games
Gold medal – first place	1994 Victoria	10,000 m
Silver medal – second place	1990 Auckland	3000 m
Bronze medal – third place	1986 Edinburgh	3000 m

Yvonne Carole Grace Murray-Mooney MBE (née Murray; born 4 October 1964) is a Scottish former middle-distance and long-distance track and road-running athlete. She won a bronze medal in the 3000 metres at the 1988 Olympic Games, and gold medals at this distance at the 1987 European Indoor Championships, the 1993 World Indoor Championships and the 1990 European Championships. She also won a gold medal in the 10,000 metres at the 1994 Commonwealth Games. Her 3000 metres best of 8:29.02 was set in the Olympic Final of 1988.

== Biography ==
Murray was born on 4 October 1964, in Musselburgh. She was initially a hockey player for Musselburgh Grammar School prior to taking up athletics in 1979.

Murray first competed on the international stage as a 16 year old representing Scotland at the 1981 IAAF World Cross Country Championships in Madrid, where she finished 79th in the senior women's race. Later that year she represented Great Britain at the European Junior Championships in Utrecht, Holland where she finished 6th in the 3000 m event.

Murray's first major senior championship appearance was at aged 18 years, where she finished 10th in both the 1500 m and 3000 m finals at the 1982 Commonwealth Games in Brisbane.

Her first major athletics medal was a bronze in the 3000 m event at the 1985 European Athletics Indoor Championships in Piraeus, Greece.

In 1986, she won the silver medal in the 3000 m event at the European Athletics Indoor Championships in Madrid, a bronze medal in the 3000 m event at the 1986 Commonwealth Games in Edinburgh and a bronze medal again in the 3000 m event at the 1986 European Championships in Stuttgart.

In 1987 she broke the championship record to win the 3000 m at the 1987 European Athletics Indoor Championships in Lievin.

At the 1988 Olympic Games in Seoul, she won a bronze medal in the 3000 m event. The winner, Tetyana Samolenko of the Soviet Union, tested positive for PEDS in 1993 and received a two-year ban from the sport. Murray never had her Olympic medal upgraded.

In 1989 Murray won the 3000 m event at the IAAF Grand Prix Final in Monaco and at the IAAF World Cup in Barcelona while representing Europe, becoming the first UK Female athlete to win a World Cup track event.

In January 1990, at the Commonwealth Games in Auckland, she won silver in the 3000 m event behind Canada's Angela Chalmers, with fellow Scot Liz McColgan third. Later that year, she won a gold medal in the 3000m event at the 1990 European Athletics Championships in Split, Yugoslavia, sprinting away from the field 550m from the finish line to become the only UK Female gold medalist at the championships.

She competed at the 1992 Olympic Games where she finished 8th in the 3000 metres event.

Murray won a gold medal at the 1993 IAAF World Indoor Championships in Toronto, again in the 3000 m event, breaking away from the field after 1000 m and winning the race by over 10 seconds, becoming the first UK Female athlete to win a World Indoor title.

In 1994, she won the silver medal in the 3000 m event at the European Athletics Championships in Helsinki, behind Sonia O'Sullivan of Ireland and then went on to win a gold medal in the 10,000 m event at the 1994 Commonwealth Games at Victoria, Canada. On her return from Canada, she won her second IAAF World Cup 3000 m title in London.

Murray has won a full set of medals at the European Indoor Championships, European Outdoor Championships and the Commonwealth Games.

Murray was also a UK champion at 5000 metres in 1983 and at 3000 metres in 1985 and 1987. She was six-times AAA champion outdoors, and AAA indoor 3000 m champion in 1984. Murray was five-times Scottish outdoor champion. Murray qualified for at least one track final in every major international championship that she contested throughout her career.

Murray held the Commonwealth 2000m record from 1986 to 2024, breaking her own record in 1994 with a time of 5:26.93.

She was awarded an MBE in 1990, was voted BBC Scotland Sports Personality of the Year in 1994 and was inducted into the Scottish Sports Hall of Fame in 2007.

As at 2024, Murray remains one of Scotland's most decorated individual athletes in Olympic, World, European, Commonwealth and World Cup competition, having won 13 medals in individual events.

== Achievements ==
Year	Competition	Venue	Position	Event	Notes
Representing Scotland
1982	World Cross Country Championships	Rome, Italy	42nd	Senior race (4.663 km)	15:35.2
1982	Commonwealth Games	Brisbane, Australia	10th	1500 m	4:16.59
1982	Commonwealth Games	Brisbane, Australia	10th	3000 m	9:21.45
1983	World Cross Country Championships	Gateshead, United Kingdom	94th	Senior race (4.072 km)	15:45
1985	World Cross Country Championships	Lisbon, Portugal	42nd	Senior race (4.99 km)	16:13
1986	World Cross Country Championships	Neuchatel, Switzerland	38th	Senior race (4.65 km)	15:48.7
1986	Commonwealth Games	Edinburgh, United Kingdom	5th	1500 m	4:14.36
1986	Commonwealth Games	Edinburgh, United Kingdom	3rd	3000 m	8:55.32
1987	World Cross Country Championships	Warsaw, Poland	16th	Senior race (5.05 km)	17:24
1990	Commonwealth Games	Auckland, New Zealand	4th	1500 m	4:09.54
1990	Commonwealth Games	Auckland, New Zealand	2nd	3000 m	8:39.46
1994	Commonwealth Games	Victoria, Canada	1st	10 000 m	31:56.97
Representing Great Britain
1985	European Indoor Championships	Piraeus, Greece	3rd	3000 m	9:00.94
1986	European Indoor Championships	Madrid, Spain	2nd	3000 m	9:01.31
1986	European Championships	Stuttgart, Germany	3rd	3000 m	8:37.15
1987	European Indoor Championships	Lievin, France	1st	3000 m	8:46.06
1987	World Indoor Championships	Indianapolis, United States	5th	3000 m	8:48.43
1987	World Championships	Rome, Italy	heats	1500 m	4:07.83
1987	World Championships	Rome, Italy	7th	3000 m	8:43.94
1988	Olympic Games	Seoul, South Korea	3rd	3000 m	8:29.02
1989	World Cup	Barcelona, Spain	1st	3000 m	8:44.32
1990	European Championships	Split, Yugoslavia	1st	3000 m	8:43.06
1991	World Championships	Tokyo, Japan	10th	3000 m	8:44.52
1992	Olympic Games	Barcelona, Spain	8th	3000 m	8:55.85
1993	World Indoor Championships	Toronto, Canada	1st	3000 m	8:50.55
1993	World Championships	Stuttgart, Germany	9th	3000 m	8:43.46
1994	European Championships	Helsinki, Finland	2nd	3000 m	8:36.48
1994	World Cup	London, United Kingdom	1st	3000 m	8:56.81
1995	World Championships	Gothenburg, Sweden	—	10,000 m	DNF

Note: At the 1989 World Cup, Murray was representing Europe.
