= Yelena Romanova =

Russian distance runner (1963-2007)

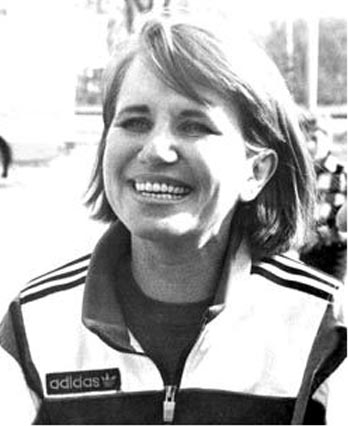

Personal information
- Born: 20 March 1963 Voronezh, Russian SFSR, Soviet Union
- Died: 28 January 2007 (aged 43) Volgograd, Russia
- Height: 1.63 m (5 ft 4 in)
- Weight: 51 kg (112 lb)

Sport
- Sport: Middle-distance running
- Club: SA Volgograd
Medal record
Women's athletics
Representing Soviet Union
World Championships
Silver medal – second place	1991 Tokyo	3000 m
European Championships
Gold medal – first place	1990 Split	10,000 m
Silver medal – second place	1990 Split	3000 m
Summer Universiade
Silver medal – second place	1983 Edmonton	3000 m

Yelena Nikolaevna Romanova (Russian: Елена Николаевна Романова; born Yelena Malikhina, 20 March 1963 – 28 January 2007) was a Russian distance runner. She won an Olympic gold medal in women's 3000 metres in 1992.

She was found dead of unknown causes at age 43 in her flat in Volgograd. At the time of her death she was employed as athletics coach at a local sports school and also worked with members of the Russian athletic team.

== International competitions ==
Year	Competition	Venue	Position	Event	Notes
Representing Soviet Union
1987	World Championships	Rome, Italy	5th	3000 m	
1988	Olympic Games	Seoul, South Korea	4th	3000 m	
1990	World Cross Country Championships	Aix-les-Bains, France	3rd	Senior race	
1990	Goodwill Games	Seattle, United States	2nd	3000 m	8:51.79
1990	European Championships	Split, Yugoslavia	2nd	3000 m	
1990	European Championships	Split, Yugoslavia	1st	10,000 m	
1991	World Championships	Tokyo, Japan	2nd	3000 m	8:36.06 PB
1991	World Championships	Tokyo, Japan	—	10,000 m	DNF
Representing Unified Team
1992	Olympic Games	Barcelona, Spain	1st	3000 m	
Representing Russia
1993	World Championships	Stuttgart, Germany	6th	3000 m	
1996	Olympic Games	Atlanta, United States	6th	5000 m	

== See also ==
- List of Olympic medalists in athletics (women)
- List of 1992 Summer Olympics medal winners
- List of World Athletics Championships medalists (women)
- List of European Athletics Championships medalists (women)
- List of Russian sportspeople
- 5000 metres at the Olympics
- 5000 metres at the World Championships in Athletics

Sporting positions
Preceded by Kathrin Weßel	Women's 5000 m Best Year Performance; 1990	Succeeded by Elana Meyer
Preceded by Elana Meyer	Women's 3000 m Best Year Performance; 1992	Succeeded by Wang Junxia
Preceded by Sonia O'Sullivan	Women's 5000 m Best Year Performance; 1994	Succeeded by Fernanda Ribeiro
