= Tetyana Dorovskikh =

Ukrainian middle-distance runner

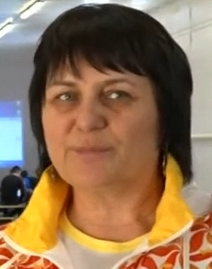
- Tetyana Samolenko in March 2017

Personal information
- Born: 12 August 1961 (age 64)
- Height: 1.66 m (5 ft 5 1/2 in)
Medal record
Women's Athletics
Olympic Games
Representing the Soviet Union
Gold medal – first place	1988 Seoul	3000 m
Bronze medal – third place	1988 Seoul	1500 m
World Championships
Gold medal – first place	1987 Rome	1500 m
Gold medal – first place	1987 Rome	3000 m
Gold medal – first place	1991 Tokyo	3000 m
Silver medal – second place	1991 Tokyo	1500 m
World Indoor Championships
Gold medal – first place	1987 Indianapolis	3000 m
Silver medal – second place	1987 Indianapolis	1500 m
European Championships
Silver medal – second place	1986 Stuttgart	1500 m
Goodwill Games
Gold medal – first place	1986 Moscow	1500 m
IAAF Grand Prix Final
Gold medal – first place	1986 Roma	1500 m
Gold medal – first place	1991 Barcelona	3000 m
European Cup
Gold medal – first place	1987 Prague	800 m
Silver medal – second place	1987 Prague	1500 m
Representing the Unified Team
Olympic Games
Silver medal – second place	1992 Barcelona	3000 m
European Indoor Championships
Silver medal – second place	1992 Genoa	3000 m

Tetyana Apaycheva (née Khamitova, Divorced Samolenko and Dorovskykh, Ukrainian: Тетяна Володимирівна Апайчева, née Хамітова, born 12 August 1961) is a Ukrainian retired middle-distance runner who represented the Soviet Union until 1991, the Unified Team in 1992, and later Ukraine. She is the 1988 Olympic champion in the 3000 metres.

== Career ==
As Tetyana Samolenko, she was the leading female middle-distance runner of the late 1980s. She was the 1988 Olympic champion at 3000 metres, the 1987 World champion at both 1500 metres and 3000 metres, and the 1987 World Indoor champion at 3000 metres. At 1500m, she also won Olympic bronze (1988), World Indoor silver (1987), European silver (1986) and the 1986 Goodwill Games title.

After giving birth in 1990, she returned to competition in 1991 competing as Tetyana Dorovskikh, and retained her World title at 3000 metres. She also won a silver medal in the 1500 metres final behind Hassiba Boulmerka. Her last major competition was the 1992 Olympic Games, where she won a silver medal in the 3000 metres and finished fourth in the 1500 metres final.

Her previous performances were impugned when she tested positive for drug use in June 1993, which effectively brought an end to her career.

== Personal life ==
She was born in a village called Sekretarka in Severny District, Orenburg Oblast, Russia, and grew up in Zaporizhzhia, Ukraine, a city receiving intense shelling by Russian forces since the 2022 invasion. Her second husband was the race walker Viktor Dorovskikh. Her third husband is the former Olympic decathlete Oleksandr Apaychev.

== Personal bests ==
- 800 metres - 1:58.56 - Donetsk 1985
- 1500 metres - 3:57.92 - Barcelona 1992
- 3000 metres - 8:26.53 - Seoul 1988

== International competitions ==
Year	Competition	Venue	Position	Event	Notes
1986	Goodwill Games	Moscow, Soviet Union	1st	1500 m	4:05.50
1986	European Championships	Stuttgart, West Germany	2nd	1500 m	4:02.36
1986	European Championships	Stuttgart, West Germany	5th	3000 m	8:40.35
1987	World Indoor Championships	Indianapolis, United States	2nd	1500 m	4:07.02
1987	World Indoor Championships	Indianapolis, United States	1st	3000 m	8:46.52
1987	World Championships	Rome, Italy	1st	1500 m	3:58.56
1987	World Championships	Rome, Italy	1st	3000 m	8:38.73
1988	Olympic Games	Seoul, South Korea	3rd	1500 m	4:00.30
1988	Olympic Games	Seoul, South Korea	1st	3000 m	8:26.53
1991	World Championships	Tokyo, Japan	2nd	1500 m	4:02.58
1991	World Championships	Tokyo, Japan	1st	3000 m	8:35.82
1992	European Indoor Championships	Genoa, Italy	2nd	3000 m	9:00.15
1992	Olympic Games	Barcelona, Spain	4th	1500 m	3:57.92
1992	Olympic Games	Barcelona, Spain	2nd	3000 m	8:46.85

Sporting positions
Preceded by Ulrike Bruns	Women's 3000 m Best Year Performance; 1988	Succeeded by Paula Ivan
