= Margareta Keszeg =

Romanian middle-distance runner

Personal information
- Born: 31 August 1965 (age 60) Mediaș, Romania

Sport
- Sport: Track and field
Medal record
Representing Romania
World Indoor Championships
Silver medal – second place	1991 Seville	3000m
Silver medal – second place	1993 Toronto	3000m
Bronze medal – third place	1989 Budapest	3000m
European Indoor Championships
Gold medal – first place	1992 Genoa	3000m
Silver medal – second place	1990 Glasgow	3000m
Silver medal – second place	1994 Paris	3000m
Summer Universiade
Silver medal – second place	1985 Kobe	1500m

Margareta Keszeg (born 31 August 1965) is a retired middle distance runner from Romania. She won several medals in European and World Indoor Championships over 3000 metres, including winning the 1992 European Indoor Championships. Her personal best time of 8:39.94 was set in 1992.

== International competitions ==
Year	Competition	Venue	Position	Event	Notes
Representing Romania
1986	European Indoor Championships	Madrid, Spain	5th	3000 m	9:09.95
1989	World Indoor Championships	Budapest, Hungary	3rd	3000 m	8:48.70
1990	European Indoor Championships	Glasgow, United Kingdom	2nd	3000 m	8:57.50
1990	European Championships	Split, Yugoslavia	5th	3000 m	8:48.04
1991	World Indoor Championships	Seville, Spain	2nd	3000 m	8:51.51
1991	World Championships	Tokyo, Japan	5th	3000 m	8:42.02
1992	European Indoor Championships	Genoa, Italy	1st	3000 m	8:59.80
1992	Olympic Games	Barcelona, Spain	11th	3000 m	9:03.16
1992	World Cup	Havana, Cuba	3rd	3000 m	9:09.03
1993	World Indoor Championships	Toronto, Canada	2nd	3000 m	9:02.89
1994	European Indoor Championships	Paris, France	2nd	3000 m	8:55.61
