= Gitte Karlshøj =

Danish long-distance runner

Gitte Karlshøj (born 14 May 1959 in Lyderslev, Stevns, Sjælland, Denmark) is a Danish long-distance runner. She ran the 3000 metres at the 1992 Summer Olympics, finishing in a non-qualifying sixth place in the qualifying round and the marathon at the 1996 Summer Olympics, failing to finish. She also made the final at the 1992 World Championships in the 10,000 metres.

Karlshøj has won 37 Danish championships at various distances. She has set three Danish records at 1000 m, 1500m and 2000 meters, and set the 2002 world record for Masters (W40) at the half marathon distance. Her personal record for the marathon is 2:31:31, just 1.53min from Dorthe Rasmussen's Danish record of 2:29:34. At almost 45 years of age, Gitte Karlshøj won the open division of the Hong Kong Marathon in 2004. She won the masters division of the Boston Marathon two years in a row. She won all distances from 800m to marathon at the European Veterans Championships in 2004, all within a week. She was the 2009 world champion at 5.000 mi class-W50. She won the Danish championship marathon in 2009, which was hosted by the Hans Christian Andersen Marathon in Odense and thus became the oldest Danish champion ever. Her finishing time was 2:51,30.

Karlshøj is the only Dane to claim to be Danish champion at all distances from 800 meters to the marathon, including cross and road race (11 different distances). Gitte chosen for European Best Female Master of the Year 2009 that is the best female athlete over 35 years in Europe. Starting her career at a fairly late age (early twenties), she teamed up with runner Flemming Jensen as her first coach and trainer. This partnership brought her from being a recognised talent to a developed professional top athlete. In the later part of her career she took over the responsibility of her own coaching and used Flemming more as a mentor. This partnership however, faded out at the time of her late career continuation.

She studied in the United States running for Seattle Pacific University. She has continued running into the Masters athletics age groups. She is the current World Record holder in the W50 division at 1500 metres, 3000 metres, 5000 metres and 10,000 metres. She also has a pending W50 world record for the mile. Karlshøj starred as a personal trainer for DR2 runners who ran the New York Marathon in Tema on Saturday in November 2006. She is a physiotherapist at Team Denmark in Aarhus and lecturer in business and sports clubs.

== Personal bests ==
- 800 metres : 2.02.9 (1992)
- 1500 metres : 4.08.61 (1991) Danish record in 1991
- 3000 metres : 8:44:35 (1991)
- 5000 metres : 15.22.95 (1993)
- 10,000 metres : 32.26.25 (1994)
- Half marathon : 1:10:50 (1996)
- Marathon: 2:31:31 (1997)

== Masters world records ==
- Half-marathon: 1:11:09 (2002), W40 (since improved)
- 1,500m: 4:40:7 (2009), W50
- Mile: 5:00:59 (2010), W50
- 3,000m: 9:47:20 (2009), W50
- 5,000m: 16:51:17 (2009), W50
- 10,000m: 35:41:8 (2009), W50
