= Roberta Brunet =

Italian runner (born 1965)

Personal information
- Nationality: Italian
- Born: 20 May 1965 (age 61) Aosta, Italy
- Height: 1.70 m (5 ft 7 in)
- Weight: 52 kg (115 lb)

Sport
- Country: Italy
- Sport: Athletics
- Events: Middle-distance running Long-distance running
- Club: CUS Roma; Fiat Torino
- Coached by: Andrea Bello

Achievements and titles
- Personal bests: 3000 m: 8:35.65 (1997); 5000 m: 14:44.50 (1996); 10000 m: 32:12.13 (1996)
Medal record
Women's athletics
Representing Italy
Event	1st	2nd	3rd
Olympic Games	0	0	1
World Championships	0	1	0
European Championships	0	0	1
Mediterranean Games	2	0	0
Total	2	1	2
Olympic Games
Bronze medal – third place	1996 Atlanta	5000 m
World Championships
Silver medal – second place	1997 Athens	5000 m
European Championships
Bronze medal – third place	1990 Split	3000 m
Mediterranean Games
Gold medal – first place	1991 Athens	3000 m
Gold medal – first place	1997 Bari	5000 m

Roberta Brunet (born 20 May 1965 in Aosta) is a former middle-distance runner from Italy

== Biography ==
Roberta Brunet won four medals, at individual level, at the International athletics competitions. She participated at four editions of the Summer Olympics (1988, 1992, 1996 and 2000), she has 41 caps in sixteen years in national team from 1983 to 2000. She won a bronze medal in the European Championships in 3,000 metres in 1990 and then won a bronze medal in the 5,000 metres at the 1996 Summer Olympics, a silver medal in the same discipline at the 1997 World Championships and a bronze medal in the 3,000 metres at the 1990 European Championships. She is a two-time national champion in the women's 5.000 metres.

== National titles ==
Roberta Brunet has won 13 times the individual national championship.

- 5 wins in the 1500 metres (1985, 1986, 1988, 1989, 1990)
- 6 wins in the 3000 metres (1986, 1988, 1989, 1990, 1992, 1994)
- 2 wins in the 5000 metres (1996, 2000)

== Personal bests ==
- 800 metres - 2:05.63 (1996)
- 1500 metres - 4:08.65 (1996)
- 2000 metres - 5:32.83 (1996)
- 3000 metres - 8:35.65 (1997)
- 5000 metres - 14:44.50 (1996)
- 10000 metres - 32:12.13 (1996)

== See also ==
- Italian all-time top lists - 5000 metres
- Italian all-time top lists - 10000 metres
