= Susan Sirma =

Kenyan middle-distance runner

Susan Sirma (born May 26, 1966) is a retired Kenyan middle-distance runner best known for winning a bronze medal over 3000 metres at the 1991 World Championships, becoming the first black African woman to win a track and field medal at World Championship or Olympic level.

== Career ==
Sirma also won two gold medals over this distance at the All-Africa Games, in fact the only times the 3000 metres was staged at the Games. In 1991 she also won the 1500 metres, her championship record still standing.

== Personal life ==
She attended the Singore Girls Secondary School in Iten. Later, she shifted her base to Japan. Fellow Kenyan-born runners Sally Barsosio and Lornah Kiplagat are her cousins.

== Achievements ==
Year	Competition	Venue	Position	Event	Notes
Representing Kenya
1987	All-Africa Games	Nairobi, Kenya	2nd	1500 m	
1987	All-Africa Games	Nairobi, Kenya	1st	3000 m	
1991	World Championships	Tokyo, Japan	7th	1500 m	
1991	World Championships	Tokyo, Japan	3rd	3000 m	8:39.41
1991	All-Africa Games	Cairo, Egypt	1st	1500 m	4:10.68 CR
1991	All-Africa Games	Cairo, Egypt	1st	3000 m	8:49.33 CR
