= 3000 metres =

Long-distance track running event

Athletics 3000 metres
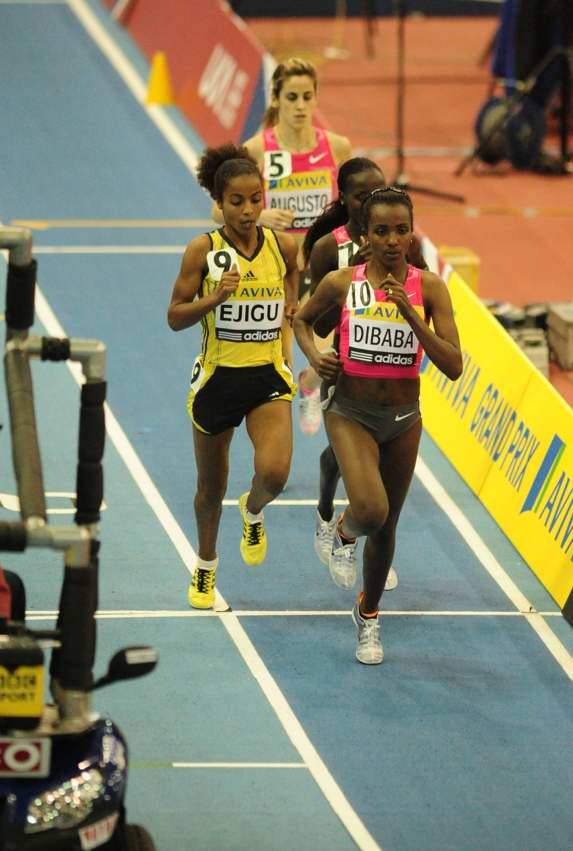
- A women's indoor 3000 m race in Birmingham featuring Sentayehu Ejigu and Tirunesh Dibaba.

World records
- Men: Jakob Ingebrigtsen (NOR) 7:17.55 (2024)
- Women: Wang Junxia (CHN) 8:06.11 (1993)

Short track world records
- Men: Grant Fisher (USA) 7:22.91 (2025)
- Women: Genzebe Dibaba (ETH) 8:16.60 (2014)

World junior (U20) records
- Men: Yomif Kejelcha (ETH) 7:28.19 (2016)
- Women: Zola Budd (GBR) 8:28.83 (1985)

The 3000 metres or 3000-metre run is a track running event, also commonly known as the "3K" or "3K run", where 7.5 laps are run around an outdoor 400 m track, or 15 laps around a 200 m indoor track.

It is debated whether the 3000 m should be classified as a middle-distance or long-distance event. In elite-level competition, 3000 m pace is more comparable to the pace found in the longer 5000 metres event, rather than mile pace. The men's world record performance for 3000 m equates to a pace of 58.34 seconds per 400 m, which is closer to the 60.43 seconds for 5000 m than the 55.46 seconds for the mile. However, the 3000 m does require some anaerobic conditioning, and an elite athlete needs to develop a high tolerance to lactic acid, as does the mile runner. Thus, the 3000 m demands a balance of aerobic endurance needed for the 5000 m and lactic acid tolerance needed for the mile.

In men's athletics, 3000 metres has been an Olympic discipline only as a team race at the 1912, 1920 and 1924 Summer Olympics. It has not been contested at any of the IAAF outdoor championships, but it is occasionally hosted at annual elite track and field meetings. It is often featured in indoor track and field programmes and is the longest-distance event present at the IAAF World Indoor Championships.

In women's athletics, 3000 metres was a standard event in the Olympic Games (1984 to 1992) and World Championships (1980 to 1993). The event was discontinued at World Championship and Olympic level after the 1993 World Championships in Athletics, with Qu Yunxia being the final gold medal winner at the event. Starting with the 1995 World Championships in Athletics and the 1996 Olympic Games, it was replaced by 5000 metres, with other IAAF-organized championships following suit.

Skilled runners in this event reach speeds near vVO_{2}max, for which the oxygen requirements of the body cannot continuously be satisfied, requiring some anaerobic effort.

== Records ==
=== World records ===
- Updated 25 August 2024.

Division	Time	Athlete	Nation	Date	Place
Men	7:17.55	Jakob Ingebrigtsen	Norway	25 August 2024	Chorzów
Women	8:06.11	Wang Junxia	China	13 September 1993	Beijing

=== Short track world records ===
- Updated 8 February 2025.

Division	Time	Athlete	Nation	Date	Place
Men	7:22.91	Grant Fisher	United States	8 February 2025	New York City
Women	8:16.60	Genzene Dibaba	Ethiopia	6 February 2014	Stockholm

=== Area records ===
- Updated 9 July 2026.

Area	Men			Women		
Area	Time	Season	Athlete	Time	Season	Athlete
Africa (records)	7:20.67	1996	Daniel Komen (KEN)	8:07.04	2025	Faith Kipyegon (KEN)
Asia (records)	7:29.60	2026	Birhanu Balew (BHR)	8:06.11 WR	1993	Wang Junxia (CHN)
Europe (records)	7:17.55 WR	2024	Jakob Ingebrigtsen (NOR)	8:18.49	2019	Sifan Hassan (NED)
North, Central America and Caribbean (records)	7:22.91 i (Note: Indoor record also ratified as outdoor record.)	2025	Grant Fisher (USA)	8:20.87 i	2024	Elle Purrier St. Pierre (USA)
Oceania (records)	7:27.57 i	2026	Cameron Myers (AUS)	8:24.20	2024	Georgia Griffith (AUS)
South America (records)	7:29.72	2026	Santiago Catrofe (URU)	8:43.26	2023	Joselyn Brea (VEN)

== All-time top 25 ==
Tables show data for two definitions of "Top 25" – the top 25 3000 m times and the top 25 athletes:
- denotes top performance for athletes in the top 25 3000 m times
- denotes lesser performances, still in the top 25 3000 m times, by repeat athletes
- denotes top performance (only) for other top 25 athletes who fall outside the top 25 3000 m times

=== Outdoor men ===
- Correct as of August 2026.

Ath.#	Perf.#	Time	Athlete	Nation	Date	Place	Ref.
1	1	7:17.55	Jakob Ingebrigtsen	Norway	25 August 2024	Chorzów	
2	2	7:20.67	Daniel Komen	Kenya	1 September 1996	Rieti	
3	3	7:21.28	Berihu Aregawi	Ethiopia	25 August 2024	Chorzów	
4	4	7:23.09	Hicham El Guerrouj	Morocco	3 September 1999	Brussels	
	5	7:23.63	Ingebrigtsen #2		17 September 2023	Eugene	
5	6	7:23.64	Yomif Kejelcha	Ethiopia	17 September 2023	Eugene	
	7	7:24.00+ (Note: by World Athletics source; 7:23.8 by official Race Analysis)	Ingebrigtsen #3		9 June 2023	Paris	
6	8	7:25.02	Ali Saïdi-Sief	Algeria	18 August 2000	Monaco	
7	9	7:25.09	Haile Gebrselassie	Ethiopia	28 August 1998	Brussels	
8	10	7:25.11	Noureddine Morceli	Algeria	2 August 1994	Monaco	
	11	7:25.16	Komen #2		10 August 1996	Monaco	
9	12	7:25.47	Grant Fisher	United States	17 September 2023	Eugene	
10	13	7:25.48	Telahun Haile Bekele	Ethiopia	17 September 2023	Eugene	
	14	7:25.54	Gebrselassie #2		8 August 1998	Monaco	
11	15	7:25.77	Mohamed Abdilaahi	Germany	16 May 2026	Shaoxing	
12	16	7:25.79	Kenenisa Bekele	Ethiopia	7 August 2007	Stockholm	
	17	7:25.87	Komen #3		23 August 1996	Brussels	
13	18	7:25.93	Thierry Ndikumwenayo	Burundi	10 August 2022	Monaco	
	19	7:26.02	Gebrselassie #3		22 August 1997	Brussels	
	20	7:26.03	Gebrselassie #4		10 June 1999	Helsinki	
14	21	7:26.11	Reynold Cheruiyot	Kenya	16 May 2026	Shaoxing	
15	22	7:26.18	Lamecha Girma	Ethiopia	5 May 2023	Doha	
	23	7:26.25	Kejelcha #2		1 July 2021	Oslo	
16	24	7:26.28	Selemon Barega	Ethiopia	17 September 2023	Eugene	
17	25	7:26.48	Andreas Almgren	Sweden	16 May 2026	Shaoxing	
18		7:26.62	Mohammed Mourhit	Belgium	18 August 2000	Monaco	
19		7:26.64	Jacob Kiplimo	Uganda	17 September 2020	Rome	
20		7:27.18	Moses Kiptanui	Kenya	25 July 1995	Monaco	
21		7:27.24	Timothy Cheruiyot	Kenya	16 May 2026	Shaoxing	
22		7:27.26	Yenew Alamirew	Ethiopia	6 May 2011	Doha	
23		7:27.43	Parker Wolfe	United States	27 August 2026	Zurich	
24		7:27.46	Cornelius Kemboi	Kenya	16 May 2026	Shaoxing	
25		7:27.55	Edwin Soi	Kenya	6 May 2011	Doha	

=== Outdoor women ===
- Correct as of July 2026.

Ath.#	Perf.#	Time	Athlete	Nation	Date	Place	Ref.
1	1	8:06.11	Wang Junxia	China	13 September 1993	Beijing	
2	2	8:07.04	Faith Kipyegon	Kenya	16 August 2025	Chorzów	
3	3	8:08.95	Agnes Ngetich	Kenya	10 July 2026	Monaco	
4	4	8:11.56	Beatrice Chebet	Kenya	25 May 2025	Rabat	
5	5	8:12.18	Qu Yunxia	China	13 September 1993	Beijing	
	6	8:12.19	Wang #2		12 September 1993	Beijing	
	7	8:12.27	Qu #2		12 September 1993	Beijing	
6	8	8:16.50	Zhang Linli	China	13 September 1993	Beijing	
7	9	8:18.49	Sifan Hassan	Netherlands	30 June 2019	Stanford	
8	10	8:19.08	Francine Niyonsaba	Burundi	28 August 2021	Paris	
9	11	8:19.52	Ejgayehu Taye	Ethiopia	28 August 2021	Paris	
10	12	8:19.78	Ma Liyan	China	12 September 1993	Beijing	
11	13	8:20.07	Konstanze Klosterhalfen	Germany	30 June 2019	Stanford	
12	14	8:20.27	Letesenbet Gidey	Ethiopia	30 June 2019	Stanford	
13	15	8:20.68	Hellen Obiri	Kenya	9 May 2014	Doha	
14	16	8:21.14	Mercy Cherono	Kenya	9 May 2014	Doha	
	17	8:21.26	Ma #2		13 September 1993	Beijing	
15	18	8:21.29	Genzebe Dibaba	Ethiopia	30 June 2019	Stanford	
16	19	8:21.42	Gabriela Szabo	Romania	19 July 2002	Monaco	
17	20	8:21.50	Diribe Welteji	Ethiopia	22 August 2024	Lausanne	
18	21	8:21.53	Margaret Chelimo Kipkemboi	Kenya	28 August 2021	Paris	
19	22	8:21.64	Sonia O'Sullivan	Ireland	15 July 1994	London	
20	23	8:21.84	Zhang Lirong	China	13 September 1993	Beijing	
	24	8:22.06	Zhang Linli #2		12 September 1993	Beijing	
21	25	8:22.20	Paula Radcliffe	Great Britain	19 July 2002	Monaco	
22		8:22.22	Almaz Ayana	Ethiopia	14 June 2015	Rabat	
23		8:22.62	Tatyana Kazankina	Soviet Union	26 August 1984	Leningrad	
24		8:22.92	Agnes Tirop	Kenya	25 September 2020	Doha	
24		8:22.92	Beatrice Chepkoech	Kenya	25 September 2020	Doha	

=== Indoor men ===
- Correct as of March 2026.

Ath.#	Perf.#	Time	Athlete	Nation	Date	Place	Ref.
1	1	7:22.91	Grant Fisher	United States	8 February 2025	New York City	
2	2	7:23.14	Cole Hocker	United States	8 February 2025	New York City	
3	3	7:23.81	Lamecha Girma	Ethiopia	15 February 2023	Liévin	
4	4	7:24.68	Mohamed Katir	Spain	15 February 2023	Liévin	
5	5	7:24.90	Daniel Komen	Kenya	6 February 1998	Budapest	
6	6	7:24.98	Getnet Wale	Ethiopia	9 February 2021	Liévin	
7	7	7:25.82	Salemon Barega	Ethiopia	6 February 2024	Toruń	
	8	7:26.10	Barega #2		9 February 2021	Liévin	
8	9	7:26.15	Haile Gebrselassie	Ethiopia	25 January 1998	Karlsruhe	
9	10	7:26.20	Berihu Aregawi	Ethiopia	28 January 2022	Karlsruhe	
	11	7:26.73	Wale #2		6 February 2024	Toruń	
	12	7:26.80	Gebrselassie #2		24 January 1999	Karlsruhe	
10	13	7:27.57	Cameron Myers	Australia	24 January 2026	Boston	
11	14	7:27.80	Yenew Alamirew	Ethiopia	5 February 2011	Stuttgart	
12	15	7:27.92	George Mills	Great Britain	2 February 2025	Val-de-Reuil	
	16	7:27.93	Komen #2		1 February 1998	Stuttgart	
	17	7:27.98	Girma #2		9 February 2021	Liévin	
13	18	7:28.00	Augustine Kiprono Choge	Kenya	5 February 2011	Stuttgart	
14	19	7:28.23	Yared Nuguse	United States	27 January 2023	Boston	
	20	7:28.29	Gebrselassie #3		28 February 2003	Karlsruhe	
	21	7:29.09	Girma #3		4 February 2024	Boston	
	22	7:29.24	Aregawi #2		9 February 2021	Liévin	
	23	7:29.34	Gebrselassie #4		15 February 2004	Karlsruhe	
15	24	7:29.37	Eliud Kipchoge	Kenya	5 February 2011	Stuttgart	
16	25	7:29.38	Yann Schrub	France	8 February 2026	Metz	
17		7:29.49	Niels Laros	Netherlands	13 February 2025	Liévin	
18		7:29.72	Graham Blanks	United States	2 March 2025	Boston	
19		7:29.94	Edwin Cheruiyot Soi	Kenya	12 February 2012	Karlsruhe	
20		7:29.99	Biniam Mehary	Ethiopia	13 February 2025	Liévin	
21		7:30.14+	Josh Kerr	United Kingdom	11 February 2024	New York City	
22		7:30.15	Ethan Strand	United States	7 December 2024	Boston	
23		7:30.16	Galen Rupp	United States	21 February 2013	Stockholm	
24		7:30.18	Jimmy Gressier	France	8 February 2025	New York City	
25		7:30.23	Parker Wolfe	United States	7 December 2024	Boston	

=== Indoor women ===
- Correct as of March 2026.

Ath.#	Perf.#	Time	Athlete	Nation	Date	Place	Ref.
1	1	8:16.60	Genzebe Dibaba	Ethiopia	6 February 2014	Stockholm	
2	2	8:16.69	Gudaf Tsegay	Ethiopia	25 February 2023	Birmingham	
	3	8:17.11	Tsegay #2		10 February 2024	Liévin	
3	4	8:19.98	Freweyni Hailu	Ethiopia	13 February 2025	Liévin	
4	5	8:20.87	Elle St. Pierre	United States	2 March 2024	Glasgow	
	6	8:21.23	Tsegay #3		2 March 2024	Glasgow	
	7	8:22.50	Dibaba #2		19 February 2016	Sabadell	
	8	8:22.65	Tsegay #4		24 February 2021	Madrid	
5	9	8:22.68	Beatrice Chepkoech	Kenya	2 March 2024	Glasgow	
6	10	8:23.24	Dawit Seyaum	Ethiopia	17 February 2022	Liévin	
7	11	8:23.72	Meseret Defar	Ethiopia	3 February 2007	Stuttgart	
8	12	8:23.74	Meselech Melkamu	Ethiopia	3 February 2007	Stuttgart	
	13	8:24.17	Hailu #2		4 February 2025	Ostrava	
9	14	8:24.39	Jessica Hull	Australia	2 March 2024	Glasgow	
	15	8:24.46	Defar #2		6 February 2010	Stuttgart	
	16	8:24.59	Hailu #3		19 February 2026	Liévin	
	17	8:24.85	Dibaba #3		15 February 2014	Birmingham	
	18	8:24.93	Hull #2		4 February 2024	Boston	
10	19	8:25.05	Alicia Monson	United States	11 February 2023	New York City	
	20	8:25.12	Tsegay #5		13 February 2025	Liévin	
	21	8:25.25	St. Pierre #2		4 February 2024	Boston	
11	22	8:25.27	Sentayehu Ejigu	Ethiopia	6 February 2010	Stuttgart	
12	23	8:25.37	Birke Haylom	Ethiopia	13 February 2025	Liévin	
13	24	8:25.70	Karissa Schweizer	United States	27 February 2020	Boston	
14	25	8:26.29	Aleshign Baweke	Ethiopia	19 February 2026	Liévin	
15		8:26.41	Laura Muir	Great Britain	4 February 2017	Karlsruhe	
16		8:26.44	Nadia Batocletti	Italy	19 February 2026	Liévin	
17		8:26.66	Shelby Houlihan	United States	27 February 2020	Boston	
18		8:26.77	Ejhayehu Taye	Ethiopia	17 February 2022	Liévin	
19		8:27.03	Linden Hall	Australia	24 January 2026	Boston	
20		8:27.86	Liliya Shobukhova	Russia	17 February 2006	Moscow	
21		8:28.03	Whittni Morgan	United States	8 February 2025	New York City	
22		8:28.46	Hirut Meshesha	Ethiopia	3 February 2024	Metz	
23		8:28.49	Anna Alminova	Russia	7 February 2009	Stuttgart	
24		8:28.69	Melissa Courtney-Bryant	Great Britain	2 February 2025	Boston	
25		8:28.71	Colleen Quigley	United States	27 February 2020	Boston	

== Medalists ==
=== Women's Olympic medalists ===
Games	Gold	Silver	Bronze
1984 Los Angeles	Maricica Puică; Romania	Wendy Smith-Sly; Great Britain	Lynn Williams; Canada
1988 Seoul	Tetyana Samolenko; Soviet Union	Paula Ivan; Romania	Yvonne Murray; Great Britain
1992 Barcelona	Yelena Romanova; Unified Team	Tetyana Dorovskikh; Unified Team	Angela Chalmers; Canada

=== Women's World Championships medalists ===
Championships	Gold	Silver	Bronze
1980 Sittard	Birgit Friedmann (FRG)	Karoline Nemetz (SWE)	Ingrid Kristiansen (NOR)
1983 Helsinki	Mary Decker (USA)	Brigitte Kraus (FRG)	Tatyana Kovalenko-Kazankina (URS)
1987 Rome	Tetyana Samolenko (URS)	Maricica Puică (ROU)	Ulrike Bruns (GDR)
1991 Tokyo	Tetyana Dorovskikh (URS)	Yelena Romanova (URS)	Susan Sirma (KEN)
1993 Stuttgart	Qu Yunxia (CHN)	Zhang Linli (CHN)	Zhang Lirong (CHN)

=== Men's World Indoor Championships medalists ===
Games	Gold	Silver	Bronze
1985 Paris^{[A]}	João Campos (POR)	Don Clary (USA)	Ivan Uvizl (TCH)
1987 Indianapolis	Frank O'Mara (IRL)	Paul Donovan (IRL)	Terry Brahm (USA)
1989 Budapest	Saïd Aouita (MAR)	José Luis González (ESP)	Dieter Baumann (FRG)
1991 Seville	Frank O'Mara (IRL)	Hammou Boutayeb (MAR)	Robert Denmark (GBR)
1993 Toronto	Gennaro Di Napoli (ITA)	Éric Dubus (FRA)	Enrique Molina (ESP)
1995 Barcelona	Gennaro Di Napoli (ITA)	Anacleto Jiménez (ESP)	Brahim Jabbour (MAR)
1997 Paris	Haile Gebrselassie (ETH)	Paul Bitok (KEN)	Ismaïl Sghyr (MAR)
1999 Maebashi	Haile Gebrselassie (ETH)	Paul Bitok (KEN)	Million Wolde (ETH)
2001 Lisbon	Hicham El Guerrouj (MAR)	Mohammed Mourhit (BEL)	Alberto García (ESP)
2003 Birmingham	Haile Gebrselassie (ETH)	Alberto García (ESP)	Luke Kipkosgei (KEN)
2004 Budapest	Bernard Lagat (KEN)	Rui Silva (POR)	Markos Geneti (ETH)
2006 Moscow	Kenenisa Bekele (ETH)	Saif Saaeed Shaheen (QAT)	Eliud Kipchoge (KEN)
2008 Valencia	Tariku Bekele (ETH)	Paul Kipsiele Koech (KEN)	Abreham Cherkos (ETH)
2010 Doha	Bernard Lagat (USA)	Sergio Sánchez (ESP)	Sammy Alex Mutahi (KEN)
2012 Istanbul	Bernard Lagat (USA)	Augustine Kiprono Choge (KEN)	Edwin Soi (KEN)
2014 Sopot	Caleb Ndiku (KEN)	Bernard Lagat (USA)	Dejen Gebremeskel (ETH)
2016 Portland	Yomif Kejelcha (ETH)	Ryan Hill (USA)	Augustine Kiprono Choge (KEN)
2018 Birmingham	Yomif Kejelcha (ETH)	Selemon Barega (ETH)	Bethwell Birgen (KEN)
2022 Belgrade	Selemon Barega (ETH)	Lamecha Girma (ETH)	Marc Scott (GB)
2024 Glasgow	Josh Kerr (GBR)	Yared Nuguse (USA)	Selemon Barega (ETH)
2025 Nanjing	Jakob Ingebrigtsen (NOR)	Berihu Aregawi (ETH)	Ky Robinson (AUS)
2026 Toruń	Josh Kerr (GBR)	Cole Hocker (USA)	Yann Schrub (FRA)

=== Women's World Indoor Championships medalists ===
Games	Gold	Silver	Bronze
1985 Paris^{[A]}	Debbie Scott (CAN)	Agnese Possamai (ITA)	PattiSue Plumer (USA)
1987 Indianapolis	Tatyana Samolenko (URS)	Olga Bondarenko (URS)	Maricica Puică (ROU)
1989 Budapest	Elly van Hulst (NED)	Liz McColgan (GBR)	Margareta Keszeg (ROU)
1991 Seville	Marie-Pierre Duros (FRA)	Margareta Keszeg (ROU)	Lyubov Kremlyova (URS)
1993 Toronto	Yvonne Murray (GBR)	Margareta Keszeg (ROU)	Lynn Jennings (USA)
1995 Barcelona	Gabriela Szabo (ROU)	Lynn Jennings (USA)	Joan Nesbit (USA)
1997 Paris	Gabriela Szabo (ROU)	Sonia O'Sullivan (IRL)	Fernanda Ribeiro (POR)
1999 Maebashi	Gabriela Szabo (ROU)	Zahra Ouaziz (MAR)	Regina Jacobs (USA)
2001 Lisbon	Olga Yegorova (RUS)	Gabriela Szabo (ROU)	Yelena Zadorozhnaya (RUS)
2003 Birmingham	Berhane Adere (ETH)	Marta Domínguez (ESP)	Meseret Defar (ETH)
2004 Budapest	Meseret Defar (ETH)	Berhane Adere (ETH)	Shayne Culpepper (USA)
2006 Moscow	Meseret Defar (ETH)	Liliya Shobukhova (RUS)	Lidia Chojecka (POL)
2008 Valencia	Meseret Defar (ETH)	Meselech Melkamu (ETH)	Mariem Alaoui Selsouli (MAR)
2010 Doha	Meseret Defar (ETH)	Vivian Cheruiyot (KEN)	Sentayehu Ejigu (ETH)
2012 Istanbul	Hellen Obiri (KEN)	Meseret Defar (ETH)	Gelete Burka (ETH)
2014 Sopot	Genzebe Dibaba (ETH)	Hellen Obiri (KEN)	Maryam Yusuf Jamal (BHR)
2016 Portland	Genzebe Dibaba (ETH)	Meseret Defar (ETH)	Shannon Rowbury (USA)
2018 Birmingham	Genzebe Dibaba (ETH)	Sifan Hassan (NED)	Laura Muir (GBR)
2022 Belgrade	Lemlem Hailu (ETH)	Elle Purrier St. Pierre (USA)	Ejgayehu Taye (ETH)
2024 Glasgow	Elle Purrier St. Pierre (USA)	Gudaf Tsegay (ETH)	Beatrice Chepkoech (KEN)
2025 Nanjing	Freweyni Hailu (ETH)	Shelby Houlihan (USA)	Jessica Hull (AUS)
2026 Toruń	Nadia Battocletti (ITA)	Emily Mackay (USA)	Jessica Hull (AUS)

- ^{^{A}} Known as the World Indoor Games

== World leading times ==
=== Men (outdoor) ===
Year	Time	Athlete	Place
1970	7:49.4 h	Bernd Diessner (GDR)	Potsdam
1971	7:39.8 h	Emiel Puttemans (BEL)	Brussels
1972	7:37.6 h	Emiel Puttemans (BEL)	Århus
1973	7:42.0 h	Brendan Foster (GBR)	London
1974	7:35.1 h	Brendan Foster (GBR)	Gateshead
1975	7:45.0 h	Rod Dixon (NZL)	Paris
1976	7:43.46	Rod Dixon (NZL)	Cologne
1977	7:41.22	Karl Fleschen (FRG)	Cologne
1978	7:32.1 h	Henry Rono (KEN)	Oslo
1979	7:37.70	Rudy Chapa (USA)	Eugene
1980	7:37.60	Eamonn Coghlan (IRL)	Oslo
1981	7:36.69	Steve Scott (USA)	Ingelheim
1982	7:32.79	David Moorcroft (GBR)	London
1983	7:35.84	Doug Padilla (USA)	Oslo
1984	7:33.3 h	Saïd Aouita (MAR)	Brussels
1985	7:32.94	Saïd Aouita (MAR)	Brussels
1986	7:32.23	Saïd Aouita (MAR)	Cologne
1987	7:40.25	Dieter Baumann (FRG)	Berlin
1988	7:38.79	Sydney Maree (USA)	Malmö
1989	7:29.45	Saïd Aouita (MAR)	Cologne
1990	7:37.09	Khalid Skah (MAR)	Cologne
1991	7:33.91	Dieter Baumann (GER)	Cologne
1992	7:28.96	Moses Kiptanui (KEN)	Cologne
1993	7:29.24	Noureddine Morceli (ALG)	Monaco
1994	7:25.11	Noureddine Morceli (ALG)	Monaco
1995	7:27.18	Moses Kiptanui (KEN)	Monaco
1996	7:20.67	Daniel Komen (KEN)	Rieti
1997	7:26.02	Haile Gebrselassie (ETH)	Brussels
1998	7:25.09	Haile Gebrselassie (ETH)	Brussels
1999	7:23.09	Hicham El Guerrouj (MAR)	Brussels
2000	7:25.02	Ali Saïdi-Sief (ALG)	Monaco
2001	7:30.53	Hailu Mekonnen (ETH)	Brussels
2002	7:34.72	Benjamin Limo (KEN)	Monaco
2003	7:30.23	Hicham El Guerrouj (MAR)	Turin
2004	7:27.72	Eliud Kipchoge (KEN)	Brussels
2005	7:28.56	Eliud Kipchoge (KEN)	Doha
2006	7:28.72	Isaac Kiprono Songok (KEN)	Rieti
2007	7:25.79	Kenenisa Bekele (ETH)	Stockholm
2008	7:31.83	Edwin Cheruiyot Soi (KEN)	Rieti
2009	7:28.37	Eliud Kipchoge (KEN)	Doha
2010	7:28.70	Tariku Bekele (ETH)	Rieti
2011	7:27.26	Yenew Alamirew (ETH)	Doha
2012	7:30.42	Augustine Choge (KEN)	Doha
2013	7:30.36	Hagos Gebrhiwet (ETH)	Doha
2014	7:31.66	Caleb Ndiku (KEN)	Ostrava
2015	7:38.08	Hagos Gebrhiwet (ETH)	Doha
2016	7:28.19	Yomif Kejelcha (ETH)	Saint-Denis
2017	7:28.73	Ronald Kwemoi (KEN)	Doha
2018	7:28.00	Yomif Kejelcha (ETH)	Gothenburg
2019	7:32.17	Selemon Barega (ETH)	Oslo
2020	7:26.64	Jacob Kiplimo (UGA)	Rome
2021	7:26.25	Yomif Kejelcha (ETH)	Oslo
2022	7:25.93	Thierry Ndikumwenayo (BDI)	Monaco
2023	7:23.63	Jakob Ingebrigtsen (NOR)	Eugene
2024	7:17.55	Jakob Ingebrigtsen (NOR)	Chorzów
2025	7:31.42	Andreas Almgren (SWE)	Sollentuna
2026	7:25.77	Mohamed Abdilaahi (GER)	Shaoxing

=== Men (indoor) ===
Year	Time	Athlete	Place
1970	7:46.85	Richard Wilde (GBR)	Vienna
1971	7:53.6 h	Peter Stewart (GBR)	Sofia
1972	7:50.0 h	Ian Stewart (GBR)	Cosford
1973	7:44.6 h	Emiel Puttemans (BEL)	Rotterdam
1974	7:48.48	Emiel Puttemans (BEL)	Gothenburg
1975	7:50.2 h	Boris Kuznetsov (URS)	Sverdlovsk
1976	7:50.2 h	Emiel Puttemans (BEL)	Paris
1977	7:47.9 h	Suleiman Nyambui (TAN)	Louisville
1978	7:48.6 h	Nick Rose (GBR)	Long Beach
1979	7:44.43	Markus Ryffel (SUI)	Vienna
1980	7:45.2 h	Steve Scott (USA)	Long Beach
1981	7:48.8 h	Lubomír Tesáček (TCH)	Prague
1982	7:46.2 h	Doug Padilla (USA)	Daly City
1983	7:49.1 h	Doug Padilla (USA)	Daly City
1984	7:46.87	Doug Padilla (USA)	East Rutherford
1985	7:42.97	Christoph Herle (FRG)	Dortmund
1986	7:46.46	Stefano Mei (ITA)	Budapest
1987	7:47.95	Paul Donovan (IRL)	East Rutherford
1988	7:41.57	Brian Abshire (USA)	East Rutherford
1989	7:39.71	Saïd Aouita (MAR)	East Rutherford
1990	7:43.69	Doug Padilla (USA)	East Rutherford
1991	7:41.14	Frank O'Mara (IRL)	Seville
1992	7:36.66	Saïd Aouita (MAR)	Piraeus
1993	7:38.46	Moses Kiptanui (KEN)	Stockholm
1994	7:40.94	Moses Kiptanui (KEN)	Lievin
1995	7:35.15	Moses Kiptanui (KEN)	Ghent
1996	7:30.72	Haile Gebrselassie (ETH)	Stuttgart
1997	7:31.27	Haile Gebrselassie (ETH)	Karlsruhe
1998	7:24.90	Daniel Komen (KEN)	Budapest
1999	7:26.80	Haile Gebrselassie (ETH)	Karlsruhe
2000	7:35.84	Million Wolde (ETH)	Stuttgart
2001	7:37.74	Hicham El Guerrouj (MAR)	Lisbon
2002	7:37.13	Alberto García (ESP)	Seville
2003	7:28.29	Haile Gebrselassie (ETH)	Karlsruhe
2004	7:29.34	Haile Gebrselassie (ETH)	Karlsruhe
2005	7:39.89	Alistair Cragg (IRL)	Roxbury
2006	7:33.07	Eliud Kipchoge (KEN)	Karlsruhe
2007	7:30.51	Kenenisa Bekele (ETH)	Karlsruhe
2008	7:31.09	Tariku Bekele (ETH)	Stuttgart
2009	7:32.80	Paul Kipsiele Koech (KEN)	Stockholm
2010	7:31.75	Augustine Kiprono Choge (KEN)	Stockholm
2010	7:27.80	Yenew Alamirew (ETH)	Stuttgart
2012	7:29.94	Augustine Choge (KEN)	Karlsruhe
2013	7:30.16	Galen Rupp (USA)	Stockholm
2014	7:34.13	Hagos Gebrhiwet (ETH)	Boston
2015	7:33.1+ h	Mo Farah (GBR)	Birmingham
2016	7:38.03	Dejen Gebremeskel (ETH)	Boston
2017	7:40.80+	Ryan Hill (USA)	New York City
2018	7:36.64	Selemon Barega (ETH)	Liévin
2019	7:37.41	Hagos Gebrhiwet (ETH)	Boston
2020	7:32.80	Getnet Wale (ETH)	Liévin
2021	7:24.98	Getnet Wale (ETH)	Liévin
2022	7:26.20	Berihu Aregawi (ETH)	Karlsruhe
2023	7:23.81	Lamecha Girma (ETH)	Liévin
2024	7:25.82	Selemon Barega (ETH)	Toruń
2025	7:22.91	Grant Fisher (USA)	New York City
2026	7:27.57	Cameron Myers (AUS)	Boston

=== Women (outdoor) ===
Year	Time	Athlete	Place
1971	9:23.4 h	Joyce Smith (GBR)	London
1972	8:53.0 h	Lyudmila Bragina (URS)	Moscow
1973	8:56.6 h	Paola Pigni (ITA)	Formia
1974	8:52.74	Lyudmila Bragina (URS)	Durham
1975	8:46.6 h	Grete Waitz (NOR)	Oslo
1976	8:27.12	Lyudmila Bragina (URS)	College Park
1977	8:36.8 h	Grete Waitz (NOR)	Oslo
1978	8:32.1 h	Grete Waitz (NOR)	Oslo
1979	8:31.75	Grete Waitz (NOR)	Oslo
1980	8:33.53	Yelena Sipatova (URS)	Moscow
1981	8:34.30	Maricica Puică (ROU)	Bucharest
1982	8:26.78	Svetlana Ulmasova (URS)	Kyiv
1983	8:32.08	Tatyana Kazankina (URS)	Saint Petersburg
1984	8:22.62	Tatyana Kazankina (URS)	Saint Petersburg
1985	8:25.83	Mary Slaney (USA)	Rome
1986	8:33.99	Olga Bondarenko (URS)	Stuttgart
1987	8:38.1 h	Ulrike Bruns (GDR)	Potsdam
1988	8:26.53	Tatyana Samolenko (URS)	Seoul
1989	8:38.48	Paula Ivan (ROU)	Gateshead
1990	8:38.38	Angela Chalmers (CAN)	Auckland
1991	8:32.00	Elana Meyer (RSA)	Durban
1992	8:33.72	Yelena Romanova (RUS)	Cologne
1993	8:06.11	Wang Junxia (CHN)	Beijing
1994	8:21.64	Sonia O'Sullivan (IRL)	London
1995	8:27.57	Sonia O'Sullivan (IRL)	Zurich
1996	8:35.42	Sonia O'Sullivan (IRL)	Nice
1997	8:27.78	Gabriela Szabo (ROU)	Zurich
1998	8:24.31	Gabriela Szabo (ROU)	Paris
1999	8:25.03	Gabriela Szabo (ROU)	Zurich
2000	8:26.35	Gabriela Szabo (ROU)	Zurich
2001	8:23.26	Olga Yegorova (RUS)	Zurich
2002	8:21.42	Gabriela Szabo (ROU)	Monte Carlo
2003	8:33.95	Gabriela Szabo (ROU)	Zurich
2004	8:31.32	Isabella Ochichi (KEN)	Paris
2005	8:28.87	Maryam Yusuf Jamal (BHR)	Oslo
2006	8:24.66	Meseret Defar (ETH)	Stockholm
2007	8:24.81	Meseret Defar (ETH)	Brussels
2008	8:33.66	Vivian Cheruiyot (KEN)	Gateshead
2009	8:30.15	Meseret Defar (ETH)	Thessaloniki
2010	8:28.41	Sentayehu Ejigu (ETH)	Monaco
2011	8:46.84	Viola Jelagat Kibiwot (KEN)	Rabat
2012	8:34.47	Mariem Alaoui Selsouli (MAR)	Eugene
2013	8:30.29	Meseret Defar (ETH)	Stockholm
2014	8:20.68	Hellen Onsando Obiri (KEN)	Doha
2015	8:22.22	Almaz Ayana (ETH)	Rabat
2016	8:23.11	Almaz Ayana (ETH)	Doha
2017	8:23.14	Hellen Obiri (KEN)	Monaco
2018	8:27.50	Sifan Hassan (NED)	Ostrava
2019	8:18.49	Sifan Hassan (NED)	Palo Alto
2020	8:22.54	Hellen Obiri (KEN)	Doha
2021	8:19.08	Francine Niyonsaba (BDI)	Paris
2022	8:24.27+	Francine Niyonsaba (BDI)	Eugene
2023	8:24.05	Beatrice Chebet (KEN)	Xiamen
2024	8:21.50	Diribe Welteji (ETH)	Lausanne
2025	8:07.04	Faith Kipyegon (KEN)	Chorzów
2026	8:08.95	Agnes Ngetich (KEN)	Monaco

=== Women (indoor) ===
Year	Time	Athlete	Place
1971	—	—	—
1972	—	—	—
1973	—	—	—
1974	—	—	—
1975	—	—	—
1976	9:05.0 h	Irina Bondarchuk (URS)	Leningrad
1977	9:03.6 h	Giana Romanova (URS)	Minsk
1978	8:57.6 h	Janice Merrill (USA)	Montréal
1979	—	—	—
1980	8:50.8 h	Grete Waitz (NOR)	Daly City
1981	8:56.4 h	Paula Fudge (GBR)	Cosford
1982	8:47.3 h	Mary Tabb (USA)	Inglewood
1983	8:52.84	Gabriele Martins (GDR)	Budapest
1984	8:48.1 h	Galina Zakharova (URS)	Boston
1985	8:49.93	Ruth Wysocki (USA)	East Rutherford
1986	8:39.79	Zola Budd (GBR)	Cosford
1987	8:43.49	Maricica Puică (ROU)	New York City
1988	8:41.79	Kathrin Wessel (GDR)	Vienna
1989	8:33.82	Elly van Hulst (NED)	Budapest
1990	8:40.45	Lynn Jennings (USA)	New York City
1991	8:49.61	Margareta Keszeg (ROU)	New York City
1992	8:43.34	Liz McColgan (GBR)	Birmingham
1993	8:50.55	Yvonne Murray (GBR)	Toronto
1994	8:55.58	Yelena Samoshchenkova (RUS)	St. Petersburg
1995	8:52.49	Lynn Jennings (USA)	Boston
1996	8:39.49	Fernanda Ribeiro (POR)	Stockholm
1997	8:45.75	Gabriela Szabo (ROM)	Paris
1998	8:43.99	Fernanda Ribeiro (POR)	Genoa
1999	8:34.09	Gabriela Szabo (ROM)	Liévin
2000	8:35.42	Gabriela Szabo (ROM)	Birmingham
2001	8:32.88	Gabriela Szabo (ROM)	Birmingham
2002	8:29.15	Berhane Adere (ETH)	Stuttgart
2003	8:31.73	Berhane Adere (ETH)	Stuttgart
2004	8:33.05	Berhane Adere (ETH)	Dortmund
2005	8:30.05	Meseret Defar (ETH)	Boston
2006	8:27.86	Liliya Shobukhova (RUS)	Moscow
2007	8:23.72	Meseret Defar (ETH)	Stuttgart
2008	8:27.93	Meseret Defar (ETH)	Stuttgart
2009	8:26.99	Meseret Defar (ETH)	Stuttgart
2010	8:24.46	Meseret Defar (ETH)	Stuttgart
2011	8:30.26	Sentayehu Ejigu (ETH)	Birmingham
2012	8:31.56	Meseret Defar (ETH)	Birmingham
2013	8:26.95	Genzebe Dibaba (ETH)	Stockholm
2014	8:16.60	Genzebe Dibaba (ETH)	Stockholm
2015	8:37.22 +	Genzebe Dibaba (ETH)	Stockholm
2016	8:22.50	Genzebe Dibaba (ETH)	Sabadell
2017	8:26.41	Laura Muir (GBR)	Karlsruhe
2018	8:31.23	Genzebe Dibaba (ETH)	Sabadell
2019	8:30.61	Laura Muir (GBR)	Glasgow
2020	8:25.70	Karissa Schweizer (USA)	Boston
2021	8:32.55	Lemlem Hailu (ETH)	Liévin
2022	8:23.24	Dawit Seyaum (ETH)	Liévin
2023	8:16.69	Gudaf Tsegay (ETH)	Birmingham
2024	8:17.11	Gudaf Tsegay (ETH)	Liévin
2025	8:19.98	Freweyni Hailu (ETH)	Liévin
2026	8:24.59	Freweyni Hailu (ETH)	Liévin

== See also ==
- 3200 meters
- 2 miles
