= Andrea Hahmann =

German middle-distance runner

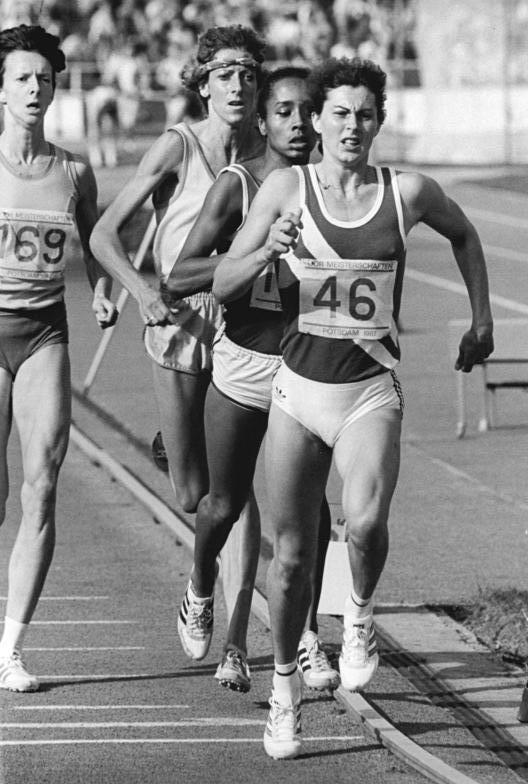
Andrea Hahmann (first from left) Ulrike Bruns (second from left), Yvonne Grabner (second from right) and Hildegard Körner (first from right) in 1987

Andrea Hahmann (née Lange, born 3 June 1966) is a German former middle-distance runner who represented the GDR. She finished fifth in the 1500m final at the 1987 World Championships, and sixth in the 1500m final at the 1988 Olympic Games.

== Career ==
Born Andrea Lange in Ludwigsfelde, Germany, she finished third in the 1500 metres at the 1987 European Cup in June behind Kirsty Wade and Tatyana Samolenko. Two months later, she ran her lifetime best for the 1500m with 4:00.07 on 22 August in Potsdam, narrowly behind fellow GDR athlete Hildegard Körner who ran 4:00.06. Two weeks later, at the 1987 World Championships in Rome, she finished fifth in the final of the 1500 metres in 4:00.63. The race was won by Samolenko in 3:58.56, with Korner second in 3:58.67.

As Andrea Hahmann, she represented the German Democratic Republic at the 1988 Seoul Olympics, where she reached the 1500m final. In a race won clearly by Romania's Paula Ivan, Hahmann was in strong contention for a medal. With just over 250 metres to go she moved into second place ahead of Romania's Doina Melinte, chased by the Soviet world champion Samolenko, and Britain's Chrissie Cahill. Coming into the home straight some 40m behind Ivan, Hahmann had a three-four metre advantage on the others. She was still in second place 50m from the line, before Samolenko and Cahill passed her. All three were then overtaken by the fast finishing Soviet Laimutė Baikauskaitė, who won the silver medal having been over 10m behind Hahmann with less than 100m to go. Samolenko won the bronze, Cahill was fourth, and Canada's Lynn Williams edged Hahmann in the final stride for fifth. Hahmann was sixth in 4:00.96.

In 1990, Hahmann won a bronze medal in the 3000 metres at the European Indoor Championships in Glasgow, behind Elly van Hulst and Margareta Keszeg.

== International competitions ==
Year	Competition	Venue	Position	Event	Notes
Representing East Germany
1987	European Cup	Prague, Czechoslovakia	3rd	1500 m	4:09.82
1987	World Championships	Rome, Italy	5th	1500 m	4:00.63
1988	Olympic Games	Seoul, South Korea	6th	1500 m	4:00.96
1990	European Indoor Championships	Glasgow, United Kingdom	3rd	3000 m	9:00.31

== Personal bests ==
- 800 m: 1:57.31 (1987)
- 1500 m: 4:00.07 (1987)
- 3000 m: 8:45.00 (1988 indoors)
