= 1986 European Athletics Championships – Women's 1500 metres =

Women's 1500 metres at the European Athletics Championships

These are the official results of the Women's 1500 metres event at the 1986 European Championships in Stuttgart, West Germany, held at Neckarstadion on 29 and 31 August 1986.

== Medalists ==
Gold	Ravilya Agletdinova; Soviet Union
Silver	Tatyana Samolenko; Soviet Union
Bronze	Doina Melinte; Romania

== Final ==
Rank	Final	Time
	Ravilya Agletdinova-Kotovich (URS)	4:01.19
	Tatyana Khamitova-Samolenko (URS)	4:02.36
	Doina Besliu-Melinte (ROU)	4:02.44
4.	Ivana Kleinova-Walterová (TCH)	4:03.09
5.	Maricica Luca-Puica (ROU)	4:03.90
6.	Svetlana Kitova (URS)	4:04.74
7.	Kirsty Wade (GBR)	4:04.99
8.	Cornelia Bürki (SUI)	4:05.31
9.	Zola Budd (GBR)	4:05.32
10.	Nikolina Shtereva-Panoyatova (BUL)	4:06.31
11.	Elly van Hulst (NED)	4:06.72
12.	Heike Oehme (GDR)	4:08.61

== Qualifying heats ==
Rank	Heat 1	Time
1.	Tatyana Samolenko (URS)	4:06.70
2.	Ivana Walterová (TCH)	4:06.75
3.	Zola Budd (GBR)	4:06.83
4.	Cornelia Bürki (SUI)	4:06.86
5.	Maricica Puică (ROU)	4:06.87
6.	Christina Boxer (GBR)	4:07.74
7.	Paula Ivan (ROU)	4:10.64
8.	Annette Sergent (FRA)	4:11.32
9.	Snežana Pajkić (YUG)	4:13.76
10.	Corinne Debaets (BEL)	4:14.97

Rank	Heat 2	Time
1.	Ravilya Agletdinova (URS)	4:06.72
2.	Kirsty Wade (GBR)	4:06.74
3.	Doina Melinte (ROU)	4:06.78
4.	Svetlana Kitova (URS)	4:06.80
5.	Nikolina Shtereva (BUL)	4:06.94
6.	Heike Oehme (GDR)	4:07.16
7.	Elly van Hulst (NED)	4:07.21
8.	Vera Michallek (FRG)	4:07.52
9.	Andri Avraam (CYP)	4:15.20
10.	Roberta Brunet (ITA)	4:15.76

== Participation ==
According to an unofficial count, 20 athletes from 14 countries participated in the event.

- Belgium (1)
- Bulgaria (1)
- Cyprus (1)
- Czechoslovakia (1)
- East Germany (1)
- France (1)
- Italy (1)
- Netherlands (1)
- Romania (3)
- Soviet Union (3)
- Switzerland (1)
- United Kingdom (3)
- West Germany (1)
- Yugoslavia (1)

== See also ==
- 1982 Women's European Championships 1500 metres (Athens)
- 1983 Women's World Championships 1500 metres (Helsinki)
- 1984 Women's Olympic 1500 metres (Los Angeles)
- 1987 Women's World Championships 1500 metres (Rome)
- 1988 Women's Olympic 1500 metres (Seoul)
- 1990 Women's European Championships 1500 metres (Split)
