= 1982 European Athletics Championships – Women's 1500 metres =

Women's 1500 metres at the European Athletics Championships

These are the official results of the Women's 1,500 metres event at the 1982 European Championships in Athens, Greece. The final was held at Olympic Stadium "Spiros Louis" on 11 September 1982.

== Medalists ==
| Gold | Olga Dvirna; Soviet Union |
| Silver | Zamira Zaytseva; Soviet Union |
| Bronze | Gabriella Dorio; Italy |

== Final ==
| Rank | Final | Time |
|---|---|---|
| | Olga Dvirna (URS) | 3:57.80 |
| | Zamira Zaytseva (URS) | 3:58.82 |
| | Gabriella Dorio (ITA) | 3:59.02 |
| 4. | Maricica Puică (ROU) | 3:59.31 |
| 5. | Ulrike Bruns (GDR) | 4:00.78 |
| 6. | Tamara Sorokina (URS) | 4:01.22 |
| 7. | Vesela Yatsinska (BUL) | 4:06.98 |
| 8. | Elly van Hulst (NED) | 4:07.76 |
| 9. | Doina Melinte (ROU) | 4:08.49 |
| 10. | Aurora Cunha (POR) | 4:12.51 |
| 11. | Birgit Friedmann (FRG) | 4:14.66 |
| 12. | Stavroula Constantinidou (GRE) | 4:28.95 |
| 13. | Katarina Sävestrand (SWE) | 4:49.28 |

== Participation ==
According to an unofficial count, 13 athletes from 10 countries participated in the event.

- Bulgaria (1)
- East Germany (1)
- Greece (1)
- Italy (1)
- Netherlands (1)
- Portugal (1)
- Romania (2)
- Soviet Union (3)
- Sweden (1)
- West Germany (1)

== See also ==
- 1978 Women's European Championships 1,500 metres (Prague)
- 1980 Women's Olympic 1,500 metres (Moscow)
- 1983 Women's World Championships 1,500 metres (Helsinki)
- 1984 Women's Olympic 1,500 metres (Los Angeles)
- 1986 Women's European Championships 1,500 metres (Stuttgart)
- 1987 Women's World Championships 1,500 metres (Rome)
- 1988 Women's Olympic 1,500 metres (Seoul)
