= 1984 European Athletics Indoor Championships – Women's 1500 metres =

The women's 1500 metres event at the 1984 European Athletics Indoor Championships was held on 3 and 4 March.

== Medalists ==
Gold	Silver	Bronze
Fița Lovin; Romania	Elly van Hulst; Netherlands	Sandra Gasser; Switzerland

== Results ==
=== Heats ===
First 2 from each heat (Q) and the next 4 fastest (q) qualified for the final.

Rank	Heat	Name	Nationality	Time	Notes
1	1	Fița Lovin	Romania	4:18.82	Q
2	1	Roswitha Gerdes	West Germany	4:18.87	Q
3	1	Gabriella Dorio	Italy	4:19.03	q
4	1	Vanya Gospodinova	Bulgaria	4:19.04	q
5	1	Elly van Hulst	Netherlands	4:19.24	q
6	1	Gloria Pallé	Spain	4:19.51	q
7	2	Sandra Gasser	Switzerland	4:21.55	Q
8	2	Maria Radu	Romania	4:21.85	Q
9	2	Lynne MacDougall	Great Britain	4:23.13	

=== Final ===
Rank	Name	Nationality	Time	Notes
1st place, gold medalist(s)	Fița Lovin	Romania	4:10.03	
2nd place, silver medalist(s)	Elly van Hulst	Netherlands	4:11.09	
3rd place, bronze medalist(s)	Sandra Gasser	Switzerland	4:11.70	
4	Vanya Gospodinova	Bulgaria	4:11.79	
5	Gloria Pallé	Spain	4:15.88	
6	Roswitha Gerdes	West Germany	4:16.34	
7	Maria Radu	Romania	4:20.84	
8	Gabriella Dorio	Italy	4:23.76	
