= Athletics at the 1986 Commonwealth Games – Women's 1500 metres =

1500 meter event at the 1986 Commonwealth Games

Women's 1500 metres at the Commonwealth Games

The women's 1500 metres event at the 1986 Commonwealth Games was held on 1 and 2 August at the Meadowbank Stadium in Edinburgh.

== Medalists ==
Gold	Silver	Bronze
Kirsty Wade; Wales	Debbie Bowker; Canada	Lynn Williams; Canada

== Results ==
=== Heats ===
Qualification: First 4 of each heat (Q) and the next 2 fastest (q) qualified for the final.

Rank	Heat	Name	Nationality	Time	Notes
1	2	Yvonne Murray	Scotland	4:11.82	Q
2	2	Christina Boxer	England	4:12.32	Q
3	2	Lynne MacDougall	Scotland	4:13.07	Q
4	2	Lynn Williams	Canada	4:13.49	Q
5	2	Anne Hare	New Zealand	4:14.44	q
6	2	Suzanne Morley	England	4:18.89	q
7	2	Sian Pilling	Isle of Man	4:24.76	
8	1	Debbie Bowker	Canada	4:26.72	Q
9	1	Kirsty Wade	Wales	4:27.20	Q
10	1	Penny Just	Australia	4:27.69	Q
11	1	Christine Pfitzinger	New Zealand	4:27.70	Q
12	1	Gillian Dainty	England	4:28.04	
13	1	Christine Whittingham	Scotland	4:33.01	
14	1	Lieketseng Mpopelle	Lesotho	4:46.43	
15	2	Puseletso Monkoe	Lesotho	4:48.60	
	1	Brit McRoberts	Canada	DNS	

=== Final ===
Rank	Name	Nationality	Time	Notes
1st place, gold medalist(s)	Kirsty Wade	Wales	4:10.91	
2nd place, silver medalist(s)	Debbie Bowker	Canada	4:11.94	
3rd place, bronze medalist(s)	Lynn Williams	Canada	4:12.66	
4	Christina Boxer	England	4:12.84	
5	Yvonne Murray	Scotland	4:14.36	
6	Christine Pfitzinger	New Zealand	4:16.81	
7	Penny Just	Australia	4:17.13	
8	Lynne MacDougall	Scotland	4:17.25	
9	Anne Hare	New Zealand	4:17.56	
10	Suzanne Morley	England	4:26.96	
