= 1987 World Championships in Athletics – Women's 1500 metres =

These are the official results of the Women's 1,500 metres event at the 1987 IAAF World Championships in Rome, Italy. There were a total of 32 participating athletes and one non-starter, with three qualifying heats and the final held on Saturday 09-05-1987. The winning margin was 0.11 seconds.

== Medalists ==
| Gold | Tetyana Samolenko; Soviet Union (URS) |
| Silver | Hildegard Körner; East Germany (GDR) |
| Bronze | Doina Melinte; Romania (ROU) |

== Records ==
Existing records at the start of the event.

| World record | Tatyana Kazankina (URS) | 3:52.47 | Zürich, Switzerland | August 3, 1980 |
| Championship record | Mary Decker-Slaney (USA) | 4:00.90 | Helsinki, Finland | August 14, 1983 |

== Final ==
| RANK | FINAL | TIME |
|---|---|---|
| | Tetyana Samolenko (URS) | 3:58.56 CR |
| | Hildegard Körner (GDR) | 3:58.67 |
| | Doina Melinte (ROU) | 3:59.27 |
| 4. | Cornelia Bürki (SUI) | 3:59.90 |
| 5. | Andrea Lange (GDR) | 4:00.63 |
| 6. | Kirsty Wade (GBR) | 4:01.41 |
| 7. | Diana Richburg (USA) | 4:01.79 |
| 8. | Elly van Hulst (NED) | 4:03.63 |
| 9. | Svetlana Kitova (URS) | 4:04.66 |
| 10. | Linda Sheskey (USA) | 4:08.33 |
| 11. | Debbie Bowker (CAN) | 4:08.38 |
| 12. | Mitica Junghiatu (ROU) | 4:10.35 |
| 13. | Marina Yachmenyova (URS) | 4:10.51 |
| — | Ulrike Bruns (GDR) | DNF |
| — | Sandra Gasser (SUI) | DSQ |

Note Sandra Gasser was the original winner of the bronze medal in 3:59.06 but was disqualified for doping.

== Qualifying heats ==
- Held on Thursday 1987-09-03

| RANK | HEAT 1 | TIME |
|---|---|---|
| 1. | Doina Melinte (ROU) | 4:05.41 |
| 2. | Hildegard Körner (GDR) | 4:05.42 |
| 3. | Tetyana Samolenko (URS) | 4:05.48 |
| 4. | Elly van Hulst (NED) | 4:05.57 |
| 5. | Linda Sheskey (USA) | 4:06.03 |
| 6. | Fatima Aouam (MAR) | 4:07.38 |
| 7. | Yvonne Murray (GBR) | 4:07.83 |
| 8. | Brit McRoberts (CAN) | 4:08.37 |
| 9. | Annika Ericson (SWE) | 4:22.59 |
| 10. | Maria Lomba (STP) | 5:01.43 |
| — | Selina Chirchir (KEN) | DNS |

| RANK | HEAT 2 | TIME |
|---|---|---|
| 1. | Andrea Lange (GDR) | 4:05.18 |
| 2. | Sandra Gasser (SUI) | 4:05.48 |
| 3. | Marina Yachmenyova (URS) | 4:05.51 |
| 4. | Mitica Junghiatu (ROU) | 4:05.60 |
| 5. | Debbie Bowker (CAN) | 4:05.90 |
| 6. | Diana Richburg (USA) | 4:07.10 |
| 7. | Brigitte Kraus (FRG) | 4:07.40 |
| 8. | Agnese Possamai (ITA) | 4:08.84 |
| 9. | Florence Giolitti (FRA) | 4:09.08 |
| 10. | Alphocinah Simelane (SWZ) | 4:35.64 (NR) |
| 11. | Georgine Tomisato (ASA) | 5:49.52 |

| RANK | HEAT 3 | TIME |
|---|---|---|
| 1. | Ulrike Bruns (GDR) | 4:08.36 |
| 2. | Cornelia Bürki (SUI) | 4:08.39 |
| 3. | Svetlana Kitova (URS) | 4:08.64 |
| 4. | Kirsty Wade (GBR) | 4:09.06 |
| 5. | Paula Ivan (ROU) | 4:09.36 |
| 6. | Vera Michallek (FRG) | 4:09.89 |
| 7. | Regina Jacobs (USA) | 4:12.52 |
| 8. | Christine Pfitzinger (NZL) | 4:13.59 |
| 9. | Maite Zúñiga (ESP) | 4:16.21 |
| 10. | Evelyn Adiru (UGA) | 4:17.72 |
| 11. | Kriscia Garcia (ESA) | 4:34.76 |

== See also ==
- 1982 Women's European Championships 1500 metres (Athens)
- 1983 Women's World Championships 1500 metres (Helsinki)
- 1984 Women's Olympic 1500 metres (Los Angeles)
- 1986 Women's European Championships 1500 metres (Stuttgart)
- 1988 Women's Olympic 1500 metres (Seoul)
- 1990 Women's European Championships 1500 metres (Split)
- 1992 Women's Olympic 1500 metres (Barcelona)
