= Athletics at the 1983 Summer Universiade – Women's 1500 metres =

The women's 1500 metres event at the 1983 Summer Universiade was held at the Commonwealth Stadium in Edmonton, Canada, on 10 and 11 July 1983.

== Medalists ==
Gold	Silver	Bronze
Gabriella Dorio; Italy	Doina Melinte; Romania	Maria Radu; Romania

== Results ==
=== Heats ===
Rank	Heat	Athlete	Nationality	Time	Notes
1	1	Tamara Koba	Soviet Union	4:15.84	Q
2	1	Doina Melinte	Romania	4:17.63	Q
3	1	Gabriella Dorio	Italy	4:17.98	Q
4	1	Sue Foster	United States	4:19.62	Q
5	1	Lynn Williams	Canada	4:19.90	q
6	2	Yelena Sipatova	Soviet Union	4:24.22	Q
7	2	Maria Radu	Romania	4:24.73	Q
8	2	Martina Krott	West Germany	4:25.64	Q
9	2	Missy Kane	United States	4:25.64	Q
10	1	Mónica Regonesi	Chile	4:26.28	q
11	2	Mercedes Calleja	Spain	4:35.51	q
12	1	Janice Carlo	Puerto Rico	4:37.28	q
13	2	Yolanda González	Mexico	4:40.38	
14	2	Glenys Kroon	New Zealand	4:41.03	
15	1	Susana Herrera	Mexico	4:42.96	
16	2	Alicia Ruano	Guatemala	4:55.09	

=== Final ===
Rank	Athlete	Nationality	Time	Notes
1st place, gold medalist(s)	Gabriella Dorio	Italy	4:07.26	
2nd place, silver medalist(s)	Doina Melinte	Romania	4:07.34	
3rd place, bronze medalist(s)	Maria Radu	Romania	4:08.41	
4	Martina Krott	West Germany	4:09.07	
5	Lynn Williams	Canada	4:12.40	
6	Missy Kane	United States	4:15.42	
7	Yelena Sipatova	Soviet Union	4:18.41	
8	Sue Foster	United States	4:22.10	
9	Mónica Regonesi	Chile	4:22.81	
10	Mercedes Calleja	Spain	4:28.63	
	Janice Carlo	Puerto Rico	DNF	
	Tamara Koba	Soviet Union	DNS	
