= 1985 European Athletics Indoor Championships – Women's 1500 metres =

The women's 1500 metres event at the 1985 European Athletics Indoor Championships was held on 3 March.

== Results ==
Rank	Name	Nationality	Time	Notes
1st place, gold medalist(s)	Doina Melinte	Romania	4:02.54	CR
2nd place, silver medalist(s)	Fița Lovin	Romania	4:03.46	
3rd place, bronze medalist(s)	Brigitte Kraus	West Germany	4:03.64	NR
4	Nikolina Shtereva	Bulgaria	4:05.34	
5	Yekaterina Podkopayeva	Soviet Union	4:06.79	
6	Elly van Hulst	Netherlands	4:08.30	
7	Ivana Walterová	Czechoslovakia	4:14.80	
8	Mary McKenna	Ireland	4:18.40	
9	Sandra Gasser	Switzerland	4:25.41	
