= Athletics at the 1984 Summer Olympics – Women's 1500 metres =

Women's 1500 metres at the Games of the XXIII Olympiad
- Venue: Los Angeles Memorial Coliseum
- Dates: August 9 (heats); August 11 (final)
- Competitors: 22 from 16 nations
- Winning time: 4:03.25

Medalists
1st place, gold medalist(s)		Gabriella Dorio; Italy
2nd place, silver medalist(s)		Doina Melinte; Romania
3rd place, bronze medalist(s)		Maricica Puică; Romania

These are the official results of the Women's 1,500m metres event at the 1984 Summer Olympics in Los Angeles, California, United States. The final was held on August 11, 1984.

== Medalists ==
Gold	Gabriella Dorio; Italy
Silver	Doina Melinte; Romania
Bronze	Maricica Puică; Romania

== Abbreviations ==
Q	automatic qualification
q	qualification by rank
DNS	did not start
NM	no mark
OR	olympic record
WR	world record
AR	area record
NR	national record
PB	personal best
SB	season best

== Final ==
Rank	Athlete	Nation	Time	Notes
1st place, gold medalist(s)	Gabriella Dorio	Italy	4:03.25	
2nd place, silver medalist(s)	Doina Melinte	Romania	4:03.76	
3rd place, bronze medalist(s)	Maricica Puică	Romania	4:04.15	
4	Roswitha Gerdes	West Germany	4:04.41	
5	Christine Benning	Great Britain	4:04.70	
6	Christina Boxer	Great Britain	4:05.53	
7	Brit McRoberts	Canada	4:05.98	
8	Ruth Wysocki	United States	4:08.32	
9	Fiţa Lovin	Romania	4:09.11	
10.	Debbie Scott	Canada	4:10.41	
11.	Lynne MacDougall	Great Britain	4:10.58	
12.	Elly van Hulst	Netherlands	4:11.58	

== Heats ==
- Held in 1984-08-09

Rank	Athlete	Nation	Time	Notes
1	Christine Benning	Great Britain	4:10.48	
2	Doina Melinte	Romania	4:10.48	
3	Fiţa Lovin	Romania	4:10.58	
4	Roswitha Gerdes	West Germany	4:10.64	
5	Brit McRoberts	Canada	4:10.64	
6	Elly van Hulst	Netherlands	4:10.69	
7	Missy Kane	United States	4:11.86	
8	Diana Richburg	United States	4:13.35	
9	Helen Ritter	Liechtenstein	4:19.39	
10.	Justina Chepchirchir	Kenya	4:21.97	
11.	Laverne Bryan	Antigua and Barbuda	4:32.44	
12.	Kriscia Lorena García	El Salvador	4:38.00	

Rank	Athlete	Nation	Time	Notes
1	Gabriella Dorio	Italy	4:04.51	
2	Maricica Puică	Romania	4:05.30	
3	Ruth Wysocki	United States	4:06.65	
4	Christina Boxer	Great Britain	4:07.40	
5	Lynne MacDougall	Great Britain	4:09.08	
6	Debbie Scott	Canada	4:09.16	
7	Jill McCabe	Sweden	4:16.48	
8	Alejandra Ramos	Chile	4:22.03	
9	Liliana Góngora	Argentina	4:28.02	
10.	Mariciane Mukamurenzi	Rwanda	4:31.56	
—	Margrit Klinger	West Germany	DNS	

== See also ==
- 1980 Women's Olympic 1,500 metres (Moscow)
- 1982 Women's European Championships 1,500 metres (Athens)
- 1983 Women's World Championships 1,500 metres (Helsinki)
- 1984 Women's Friendship Games 1,500 metres (Prague)
- 1986 Women's European Championships 1,500 metres (Stuttgart)
- 1987 Women's World Championships 1,500 metres (Rome)
- 1988 Women's Olympic 1,500 metres (Seoul)
