= Athletics at the 1983 Summer Universiade – Women's 800 metres =

The women's 800 metres event at the 1983 Summer Universiade was held at the Commonwealth Stadium in Edmonton, Canada on 8 and 9 July 1983.

== Medalists ==
Gold	Silver	Bronze
Irina Podyalovskaya; Soviet Union	Robin Campbell; United States	Doina Melinte; Romania

== Results ==
=== Heats ===
Rank	Heat	Athlete	Nationality	Time	Notes
1	1	Robin Campbell	United States	2:01.37	Q
2	1	Irina Podyalovskaya	Soviet Union	2:01.65	Q
3	1	Kirsty McDermott	Great Britain	2:02.44	Q
4	2	Doina Melinte	Romania	2:03.69	Q
5	1	Heather Barralet	Australia	2:04.30	q
6	2	Svetlana Kitova	Soviet Union	2:04.45	Q
7	2	Diana Richburg	United States	2:04.54	Q
8	2	Margaret Lindenmann	Switzerland	2:06.03	q
9	1	Grace Verbeek	Canada	2:06.40	
10	1	Sara Toulbi	Tunisia	2:09.42	
11	2	Yolanda González	Mexico	2:12.18	
12	2	Shiny Kurishgal Abraham	India	2:14.63	
13	2	Sara Tavares	Angola	2:27.64	
14	1	Ana Daio	Angola	2:32.63	
	2	Christine Slythe	Canada	DNF	

=== Final ===
Rank	Athlete	Nationality	Time	Notes
1st place, gold medalist(s)	Irina Podyalovskaya	Soviet Union	1:59.29	
2nd place, silver medalist(s)	Robin Campbell	United States	1:59.81	
3rd place, bronze medalist(s)	Doina Melinte	Romania	1:59.93	
4	Svetlana Kitova	Soviet Union	2:01.66	
5	Diana Richburg	United States	2:02.32	
6	Heather Barralet	Australia	2:03.30	
7	Margaret Lindenmann	Switzerland	2:04.09	
8	Kirsty McDermott	Great Britain	2:04.37	
