= 1991 World Championships in Athletics – Women's 1500 metres =

Sporting event

These are the official results of the Women's 1500 metres event at the 1991 IAAF World Championships in Tokyo, Japan. There were a total number of 42 participating athletes, with three qualifying heats and the final held on Saturday August 31, 1991. The winning margin was 0.37 seconds.

== Medalists ==
Gold	Hassiba Boulmerka; Algeria (ALG)
Silver	Tetyana Dorovskikh; Soviet Union (URS)
Bronze	Lyudmila Rogachova; Soviet Union (URS)

== Schedule ==
- All times are Japan Standard Time (UTC+9)

Heats
29.08.1991 – 16:15h
Final
31.08.1991 – 19:00h

== Final ==
RANK	FINAL	TIME
	Hassiba Boulmerka (ALG)	4:02.21
	Tetyana Dorovskikh (URS)	4:02.58
	Lyudmila Rogachova (URS)	4:02.72
4.	Doina Melinte (ROM)	4:03.19
5.	Ellen Kiessling (GER)	4:04.75
6.	Kirsty Wade (GBR)	4:05.16
7.	Susan Sirma (KEN)	4:05.47
8.	Małgorzata Rydz (POL)	4:05.52
9.	Letitia Vriesde (SUR)	4:05.67
10.	Violeta Beclea (ROM)	4:05.86
11.	Debbie Bowker (CAN)	4:06.06
12.	PattiSue Plumer (USA)	4:06.80
13.	Yvonne Mai (GER)	4:07.45
14.	Elena Fidatov (ROM)	4:10.15
15.	Ravilya Kotovich (URS)	4:17.59

== Qualifying heats ==
- Held on Thursday 1991-08-29

RANK	HEAT 1	TIME
1.	Susan Sirma (KEN)	4:04.94
2.	Debbie Bowker (CAN)	4:05.07
3.	Patti Sue Plumer (USA)	4:05.08
4.	Ravilya Kotovich (URS)	4:05.53
5.	Violeta Beclea (ROM)	4:05.77
6.	Yvonne Mai (GER)	4:06.06
7.	Kirsty Wade (GBR)	4:07.22
8.	Yvonne van der Kolk (NED)	4:07.39
9.	Christine Pfitzinger (NZL)	4:08.43
10.	Khin Khin Htwe (MYA)	4:12.21
11.	Estela Estévez (ESP)	4:13.93
12.	Snežana Pajkić (YUG)	4:14.20
13.	Zheng Lijuan (CHN)	4:14.95
–	Dawn Williams-Sewer (DMA)	DNS

RANK	HEAT 2	TIME
1.	Hassiba Boulmerka (ALG)	4:08.20
2.	Lyudmila Rogachova (URS)	4:08.34
3.	Letitia Vriesde (SUR)	4:08.46
4.	Elena Fidatov (ROM)	4:08.81
5.	Christina Cahill (GBR)	4:09.01
6.	Darcy Arreola (USA)	4:13.08
7.	Ivana Kubešová (TCH)	4:14.69
8.	Leah Pells (CAN)	4:14.82
9.	Aisling Molloy (IRL)	4:16.61
10.	Veronique Pongerard (FRA)	4:16.87
11.	Bigna Samuel (VIN)	4:29.42
12.	Mantokoane Pitso (LES)	4:42.79
–	Sandra Gasser (SUI)	DNF
–	Ana Isabel Elias (ANG)	DNS

RANK	HEAT 3	TIME
1.	Doina Melinte (ROM)	4:08.78
2.	Ellen Kiessling (GER)	4:09.23
3.	Tetyana Dorovskikh (URS)	4:09.25
4.	Małgorzata Rydz (POL)	4:09.31
5.	Gabriella Dorio (ITA)	4:09.34
6.	Irini Theodoridou (GRE)	4:11.14
7.	Karin Medin (SWE)	4:11.23
8.	Robyn Meagher (CAN)	4:12.47
9.	Suzy Hamilton (USA)	4:15.54
10.	Jana Kučeríková (TCH)	4:15.69
11.	Tuuli Merikoski (FIN)	4:17.57
12.	Edith Nakiyingi (UGA)	4:25.43
13.	Rosalie Gangué (CHA)	4:54.41
–	Pauline Konga (KEN)	DNS

== See also ==
- 1987 Women's World Championships 1500 metres (Rome)
- 1988 Women's Olympic 1500 metres (Seoul)
- 1990 Women's European Championships 1500 metres (Split)
- 1992 Women's Olympic 1500 metres (Barcelona)
- 1993 Women's World Championships 1500 metres (Stuttgart)
