= Athletics at the Friendship Games – Women's 1500 metres =

The women's 1500 metres event at the Friendship Games was held on 18 August 1984 at the Evžen Rošický Stadium in Prague, Czechoslovakia.

== Results ==
Rank	Name	Nationality	Time	Notes
1st place, gold medalist(s)	Nadezhda Ralldugina	Soviet Union	3:56.63	
2nd place, silver medalist(s)	Ravilya Agletdinova	Soviet Union	3:58.70	
3rd place, bronze medalist(s)	Yekaterina Podkopayeva	Soviet Union	4:01.61	
4	Vanya Stoyanova	Bulgaria	4:06.87	
5	Christiane Wartenberg	East Germany	4:08.60	
6	Ivana Kleinová	Czechoslovakia	4:10.26	
7	Rositsa Ekova	Bulgaria	4:11.50	
8	Eva Jurková	Czechoslovakia	4:12.71	
9	Jana Červenková	Czechoslovakia	4:15.68	
10	Elizabeta Molteni	Italy	4:26.69	
11	Alice Silva	Portugal	4:29.80	
12	Jutta Zimmermann	Austria	4:39.16	
13	Anni Müller	Austria	4:53.80	

== See also ==
- Athletics at the 1984 Summer Olympics – Women's 1500 metres
