= Athletics at the 1987 Pan American Games – Women's 1500 metres =

Women's 1500 metres at the Pan American Games

The women's 1500 metres event at the 1987 Pan American Games was held in Indianapolis, United States on 12 August.

== Results ==
Rank	Name	Nationality	Time	Notes
1st place, gold medalist(s)	Linda Sheskey	United States	4:07.84	
2nd place, silver medalist(s)	Debbie Bowker	Canada	4:08.43	
3rd place, bronze medalist(s)	Brit McRoberts	Canada	4:11.35	
4	Soraya Telles	Brazil	4:14.64	NR
5	Diana Richburg	United States	4:15.04	
6	Angelita Lind	Puerto Rico	4:25.68	
7	Kriscia García	El Salvador	4:34.29	
8	Natividad Fernández	Paraguay	4:41.50	
