= 1988 European Athletics Indoor Championships – Women's 1500 metres =

The women's 1500 metres event at the 1988 European Athletics Indoor Championships was held on 5 and 6 March.

== Medalists ==
| Gold | Silver | Bronze |
|---|---|---|
| Doina Melinte; Romania | Mitică Constantin; Romania | Brigitte Kraus; West Germany |

== Results ==
=== Heats ===
First 3 from each heat (Q) and the next 3 fastest (q) qualified for the final.

| Rank | Heat | Name | Nationality | Time | Notes |
|---|---|---|---|---|---|
| 1 | 2 | Marina Yachmenyova | Soviet Union | 4:10.15 | Q |
| 2 | 2 | Doina Melinte | Romania | 4:11.53 | Q |
| 3 | 2 | Mayte Zúñiga | Spain | 4:11.92 | Q |
| 4 | 2 | Katalin Rácz | Hungary | 4:12.77 | q |
| 5 | 2 | Christine Toonstra | Netherlands | 4:14.05 | q |
| 6 | 1 | Brigitte Kraus | West Germany | 4:16.02 | Q |
| 7 | 1 | Mitică Constantin | Romania | 4:16.80 | Q |
| 8 | 1 | Rita Csordos | Hungary | 4:16.80 | Q |
| 9 | 1 | Heléna Barócsi | Hungary | 4:16.85 | q |
| 10 | 1 | Anushka Dimitrova | Bulgaria | 4:17.67 | |
| 11 | 1 | Valentina Tauceri | Italy | 4:19.97 | |
| 12 | 2 | Uta Eckhardt | West Germany | 4:23.59 | |

=== Final ===
| Rank | Name | Nationality | Time | Notes |
|---|---|---|---|---|
| 1st place, gold medalist(s) | Doina Melinte | Romania | 4:05.77 | |
| 2nd place, silver medalist(s) | Mitică Constantin | Romania | 4:06.16 | |
| 3rd place, bronze medalist(s) | Brigitte Kraus | West Germany | 4:07.06 | |
| 4 | Marina Yachmenyova | Soviet Union | 4:08.31 | |
| 5 | Mayte Zúñiga | Spain | 4:11.31 | |
| 6 | Katalin Rácz | Hungary | 4:12.05 | |
| 7 | Rita Csordos | Hungary | 4:12.63 | |
| 8 | Christine Toonstra | Netherlands | 4:14.94 | |
| 9 | Heléna Barócsi | Hungary | 4:17.36 | |
