= Athletics at the 1983 Summer Universiade – Women's 3000 metres =

The women's 3000 metres event at the 1983 Summer Universiade was held at the Commonwealth Stadium in Edmonton, Canada on 8 July 1983.

== Results ==
Rank	Athlete	Nationality	Time	Notes
1st place, gold medalist(s)	Maria Radu	Romania	9:04.32	
2nd place, silver medalist(s)	Yelena Malychina	Soviet Union	9:06.17	
3rd place, bronze medalist(s)	Lynn Kanuka-Williams	Canada	9:07.74	
4	Kathy Hayes	United States	9:12.14	
5	Nancy Rooks	Canada	9:13.16	
6	Yelena Sipatova	Soviet Union	9:21.06	
7	Joan Hansen	United States	9:29.86	
8	Mónica Regonesi	Chile	9:36.61	
9	Mercedes Calleja	Spain	9:51.46	
10	Genovev Dominguez	Mexico	9:54.02	
11	Glenys Kroon	New Zealand	10:14.85	
12	Susana Herrera	Mexico	10:15.92	
13	Janice Carlo	Puerto Rico	10:31.03	
14	Alicia Ruano Barrientos	Guatemala	10:32.65	
