= Athletics at the 1987 Summer Universiade – Women's 1500 metres =

The women's 1500 metres event at the 1987 Summer Universiade was held at the Stadion Maksimir in Zagreb on 14 and 16 July 1987.

== Medalists ==
Gold	Silver	Bronze
Paula Ivan; Romania	Svetlana Kitova; Soviet Union	Mitica Junghiatu; Romania

== Results ==
=== Heats ===
Rank	Heat	Athlete	Nationality	Time	Notes
1	1	Paula Ivan	Romania	4:10.70	Q
2	1	Svetlana Kitova	Soviet Union	4:10.99	Q
3	3	Birgit Barth	East Germany	4:19.11	Q
4	3	Suzy Favor	United States	4:19.34	Q
5	3	Vesna Bajer	Yugoslavia	4:19.71	Q
6	3	Valentina Tauceri	Italy	4:20.14	q
7	2	Mitica Junghiatu	Romania	4:21.67	Q
8	2	Alisa Harvey	United States	4:22.04	Q
9	3	Irini Theodoridou	Greece	4:22.22	q
10	2	Claudia Borgschulze	West Germany	4:22.52	Q
11	2	Silvia Rožić	Yugoslavia	4:25.45	q
12	2	Nadia Ouaziz	Morocco	4:27.98	
13	1	Katalin Racz	Hungary	4:28.60	Q
14	1	Asunción Sinobas	Spain	4:29.51	
15	3	Alison Wyeth	Great Britain	4:32.74	
16	3	Elizabeth Casillas	Puerto Rico	4:45.93	
	1	Ghada Kadouda	Sudan	DNF	
	1	Sarah Collins	Australia	DNS	

=== Final ===
Rank	Athlete	Nationality	Time	Notes
1st place, gold medalist(s)	Paula Ivan	Romania	4:01.32	
2nd place, silver medalist(s)	Svetlana Kitova	Soviet Union	4:03.03	
3rd place, bronze medalist(s)	Mitica Junghiatu	Romania	4:03.04	
4	Birgit Barth	East Germany	4:05.54	
5	Claudia Borgschulze	West Germany	4:09.64	
6	Alisa Harvey	United States	4:10.49	
7	Vesna Bajer	Yugoslavia	4:12.89	
8	Irini Theodoridou	Greece	4:13.76	
9	Suzy Favor	United States	4:14.77	
10	Katalin Racz	Hungary	4:18.16	
11	Valentina Tauceri	Italy	4:18.95	
12	Silvia Rožić	Yugoslavia	4:20.88	
