= 1987 IAAF World Indoor Championships – Women's 3000 metres =

The women's 3000 metres event at the 1987 IAAF World Indoor Championships was held at the Hoosier Dome in Indianapolis on 7 March.

== Results ==
Rank	Name	Nationality	Time	Notes
1st place, gold medalist(s)	Tatyana Samolenko	Soviet Union	8:46.52	CR
2nd place, silver medalist(s)	Olga Bondarenko	Soviet Union	8:47.08	
3rd place, bronze medalist(s)	Maricica Puică	Romania	8:47.92	
4	Krishna Wood	Australia	8:48.38	AR
5	Yvonne Murray	Great Britain	8:48.43	
6	Lynn Williams	Canada	8:50.80	NR
7	Leslie Seymour	United States	8:54.55	PB
8	Elly van Hulst	Netherlands	8:57.46	
9	Ingrid Delagrange	Belgium	9:19.45	
10	Ena Guevara	Peru	9:35.64	
11	Cornelia Melis	Aruba	10:24.79	NR
	Brigitte Kraus	West Germany	DNF	
