= 1987 European Athletics Indoor Championships – Women's 3000 metres =

The women's 3000 metres event at the 1987 European Athletics Indoor Championships was held on 22 February.

== Results ==
Rank	Name	Nationality	Time	Notes
1st place, gold medalist(s)	Yvonne Murray	Great Britain	8:46.06	CR
2nd place, silver medalist(s)	Elly van Hulst	Netherlands	8:51.40	NR
3rd place, bronze medalist(s)	Brigitte Kraus	West Germany	8:53.01	NR
4	Vera Michallek	West Germany	8:55.58	
5	Christina Mai	West Germany	8:56.98	
6	Ingrid Delagrange	Belgium	9:11.38	NR
	Wenche Sørum	Norway	DNS	
