= 1983 European Athletics Indoor Championships – Women's 1500 metres =

The women's 1500 metres event at the 1983 European Athletics Indoor Championships was held on 6 March.

== Results ==
Rank	Name	Nationality	Time	Notes
1st place, gold medalist(s)	Brigitte Kraus	West Germany	4:16.14	
2nd place, silver medalist(s)	Maria Radu	Romania	4:17.16	
3rd place, bronze medalist(s)	Ivana Kleinová	Czechoslovakia	4:17.21	
4	Gabriella Dorio	Italy	4:17.42	
5	Anne-Marie Van Nuffel	Belgium	4:20.73	
6	Yelena Sipatova	Soviet Union	4:24.19	
7	Zita Ágoston	Hungary	4:27.74	
	Doris Weilharter	Austria	DNF	
