= 1978 European Athletics Indoor Championships – Women's 1500 metres =

The women's 1500 metres event at the 1978 European Athletics Indoor Championships was held on 12 March in Milan.

== Results ==
Rank	Name	Nationality	Time	Notes
1st place, gold medalist(s)	Ileana Silai	Romania	4:07.1	CR
2nd place, silver medalist(s)	Natalia Mărășescu	Romania	4:07.4	
3rd place, bronze medalist(s)	Brigitte Kraus	West Germany	4:07.6	
4	Vesela Yatsinska	Bulgaria	4:10.5	
5	Silvana Cruciata	Italy	4:12.5	
6	Christiane Wartenberg	East Germany	4:14.1	
7	Irén Lipcsei	Hungary	4:18.4	
8	Rumyana Chavdarova	Bulgaria	4:32.0	
