= Athletics at the 1980 Summer Olympics – Women's 1500 metres =

Women's 1500 metres at the Games of the XXII Olympiad
- Venue: Lenin Central Stadium
- Date: 31 July 1980 (heats); 1 August 1980 (final)
- Competitors: 26 from 16 nations
- Winning time: 3:56.6 OR

Medalists
1st place, gold medalist(s)		Tatyana Kazankina; Soviet Union
2nd place, silver medalist(s)		Christiane Wartenberg; East Germany
3rd place, bronze medalist(s)		Nadezhda Olizarenko; Soviet Union

These are the official results of the women's 1,500m metres event at the 1980 Summer Olympics in Moscow, Russian SFSR, Soviet Union. There were a total number of 26 participating athletes, with the final was held on Friday 1980-08-01.

== Final ==
Rank	Athlete	Nation	Time	Notes
1st place, gold medalist(s)	Tatyana Kazankina	Soviet Union	3:56.6 OR	
2nd place, silver medalist(s)	Christiane Wartenberg	East Germany	3:57.8	
3rd place, bronze medalist(s)	Nadezhda Olizarenko	Soviet Union	3:59.6	
4	Gabriella Dorio	Italy	4:00.3	
5	Ulrike Bruns	East Germany	4:00.7	
6	Lyubov Smolka	Soviet Union	4:01.3	
7	Maricica Puică	Romania	4:01.3	
8	Ileana Silai	Romania	4:03.0	
9	Natalia Mărășescu	Romania	4:04.8	

== Semi-finals ==
- Held on Wednesday 1980-07-30

Rank	Athlete	Nation	Time	Notes
1	Tatyana Kazankina	Soviet Union	3:59.2 OR	
2	Nadezhda Olizarenko	Soviet Union	3:59.5	
3	Christiane Wartenberg	East Germany	4:00.4	
4	Ulrike Bruns	East Germany	4:01.6	
5	Maricica Puică	Romania	4:01.7	
6	Vesela Yatsinska	Bulgaria	4:04.7	
7	Cornelia Bürki	Switzerland	4:05.5	
8	Totka Petrova	Bulgaria	4:13.8	
9	Janet Marlow	Great Britain	4:15.9	
10.	Amsale Woldegibriel	Ethiopia	4:25.3	
11.	Marcellina Emmanuel	Tanzania	4:26.8	
12.	Albertine Rahéliarisoa	Madagascar	4:30.8	
13.	Margaret Morel	Seychelles	4:37.9	

Rank	Athlete	Nation	Time	Notes
1	Lyubov Smolka	Soviet Union	4:04.4	
2	Ileana Silai	Romania	4:04.7	
3	Gabriella Dorio	Italy	4:05.0	
4	Natalia Mărășescu	Romania	4:05.9	
5	Anna Bukis	Poland	4:06.0	
6	Beate Liebich	East Germany	4:06.8	
7	Nikolina Shtereva	Bulgaria	4:08.3	
8	Breda Pergar	Yugoslavia	4:13.2	
9	Agnese Possamai	Italy	4:14.7	
10.	Mwinga Mwanjala	Tanzania	4:20.9	
11.	Trịnh Thị Bé	Vietnam	4:38.6	
—	Hala El-Moughrabi	Syria	DNS	
—	Geeta Zutshi	India	DNS	

== See also ==
- 1976 Women's Olympic 1,500 metres (Montreal)
- 1982 Women's European Championships 1,500 metres (Athens)
- 1983 Women's World Championships 1,500 metres (Helsinki)
- 1984 Women's Olympic 1,500 metres (Los Angeles)
