= Ravilya Agletdinova =

Soviet middle-distance runner

Personal information
- Born: 10 February 1960 Kurgan-Tyube, Tajik SSR, Soviet Union
- Died: 25 June 1999 (aged 39) Žlobin, Belarus

Sport
- Sport: Track and field
Medal record
Representing Soviet Union
European Championships
| Gold medal – first place | 1986 Stuttgart | 1500 m |
IAAF World Cup
| Silver medal – second place | 1985 Canberra | 1500 m |
European Cup
| Gold medal – first place | 1985 Moscow | 1500 m |
Goodwill Games
| Silver medal – second place | 1986 Moscow | 1500 m |

Ravilya Agletdinova (Russian: Равиля Аглетдинова; married name Kotovich; 10 February 1960 – 25 June 1999) was a Soviet middle-distance runner who competed in 800 metres, 1500 metres and 3000 metres events.

She was the 1500 m gold medallist at the 1986 European Athletics Championships and appeared three times at the World Championships in Athletics, her best finish being fourth in 1983. In lower level competitions, she was the winner of the 1985 European Cup in an unbeaten championship record and took silver medals at the IAAF World Cup, Friendship Games and Goodwill Games.

She was a three-time champion at the Soviet Athletics Championships. Her personal bests for the 800 m (1:56.24 minutes) and 1500 m (3:58.40 minutes) remain the Belarusian records for the distance. Her daughter Maryna Arzamasava is also a runner. Agletdinova died in a traffic accident in 1999.

== Career ==
=== Early career ===
Agletdinova was born in Kurgan-Tyube in the Tajik SSR of the Soviet Union. She moved to the Belarusian SSR in 1980 and established herself as a high level runners shortly afterwards, setting bests of 1:58.65 minutes for the 800 m and 4:04.40 minutes for the 1500 m. She improved her 800 m best to 1.56.1 minutes in 1982, then was selected for the 1982 European Athletics Championships as a result, where she reached the semi-finals.

Agletdinova dipped under four minutes for the 1500 m in Birmingham in 1983, setting a new best of 3:59.31 minutes. She was the fastest Soviet entrant at the 1983 World Championships in Athletics, and as the winner of the first ever 1500 m world championship heat she was the inaugural championship record holder. Ultimately was the slowest finisher in the final among the Soviet trio including Yekaterina Podkopayeva and Zamira Zaytseva. America's Mary Decker claimed the gold medal and Agletdinova ended the race in fourth place. Still, her time that year ranked her as the world's second fastest 1500 m athlete for the season behind Decker. She remained among the world's best in the 1984, but the Olympic boycott meant she only competed at the Friendship Games, where she was the 1500 m silver medallist behind fellow Soviet Nadezhda Ralldugina.

=== European and national titles ===
She reached the top of the national scene in 1985 by winning a middle-distance double at the Soviet Athletics Championships. Her times of 1:56.24 minutes and 3:58.40 minutes at the championships ranked her as the third fastest athlete of the season for both disciplines. These remain the Belarusian records for the distances. She showed her regional dominance at the 1985 European Cup by winning the 1500 m race by a margin of over four seconds with 3:58.40 minutes, which was the best performance ever recorded at the event by several seconds. A more tactical race came at the 1985 IAAF World Cup towards the end of the season and she was beaten into second place by East Germany's Hildegard Körner.

Agletdinova (setting a time of 3:59.84 minutes) was runner-up over 1500 m to Tatyana Samolenko at the Soviet Championships in 1986, and the pair repeated that placing at the Goodwill Games in Moscow, leaving Agletdinova as silver medallist. Both were the favoured athletes for that distance at the 1986 European Athletics Championships held the following month and Agletdinova turned the positions around. With a final lap of 59 seconds, she took the European title with a time of 4:01.19 minutes ahead of her compatriot as well as Doina Melinte (800 m champion and fastest that year). After this she took a break from athletics and after marrying she had a daughter around 1988.

=== Later life and career ===
She returned to competition in the 1990 season and won the third national title of her career with a win over 3000 metres. Her time of 8.46.86 minutes ranked her in the top ten for the season. She gained selection for the 1500 m at the 1991 World Championships in Athletics, but after a quick heat she was much slower in the final and finished last in 15th place.

After the dissolution of the Soviet Union, she began competing for Belarus internationally. She ran in both the 1500 m and 3000 m in her country's first appearance at the 1993 World Championships in Athletics, but the 33-year-old did not progress beyond the heats. Her last international appearance was an outing in the short race at the 1994 European Cross Country Championships, where she was 66th.

For her achievements, she was honoured as Master of Sport of the Republic of Belarus by presidential decree. Following her retirement from athletics she worked in Minsk for the marketing department of Delo magazine. On 25 June 1999, she died after a traffic accident near Žlobin in Belarus at the age of 39. After her death a track and field meeting in Minsk was created in her honour: the Ravilya Agletdinova Memorial. Her daughter Maryna Arzamasava competed in the meeting and won the 600 metres race. Arzamasava later won the 800 m European title, following in her mother's footsteps.

== Personal bests ==
- 800 metres: 1:56.1 minutes (1982, hand-timed)/1:56.24 minutes (1985, automatic) NR
- 1500 metres: 3:58.40 minutes (1985) NR
- 3000 metres: 8:46.86 minutes (1990)

== National titles ==
- Soviet Athletics Championships
  - 800 m: 1985
  - 1500 m: 1985
  - 3000 m: 1990

== International competitions ==
| Year | Competition | Venue | Position | Event | Notes |
|---|---|---|---|---|---|
| 1982 | European Championships | Athens, Greece | 12th | 800 m | 2:02.82 |
| 1983 | World Championships | Helsinki, Finland | 4th | 1500 m | 4:02.67 |
| 1984 | Friendship Games | Moscow, Soviet Union | 2nd | 1500 m | 3:58.70 |
| 1985 | European Cup | Moscow, Soviet Union | 1st | 1500 m | 3:58.40 CR |
| 1985 | World Cup | Canberra, Australia | 2nd | 1500 m | 4:11.21 |
| 1986 | Goodwill Games | Moscow, Soviet Union | 2nd | 1500 m | 4:06.14 |
| 1986 | European Championships | Stuttgart, West Germany | 1st | 1500 m | 4:01.19 |
| 1990 | Goodwill Games | Seattle, United States | 5th | 3000 m | 8:53.20 |
| 1991 | World Championships | Tokyo, Japan | 15th | 1500 m | 4:17.59 |
| 1993 | World Championships | Stuttgart, West Germany | 11th (heats) | 1500 m | 4:17.43 |
| 1993 | World Championships | Stuttgart, West Germany | DNF (heats) | 3000 m | |
| 1994 | European Cross Country Championships | Alnwick, United Kingdom | 66th | Short race | 16:16 |
