= 1987 IAAF World Indoor Championships – Women's 1500 metres =

The women's 1500 metres event at the 1987 IAAF World Indoor Championships was held at the Hoosier Dome in Indianapolis on 8 March.

== Results ==
Rank	Name	Nationality	Time	Notes
1st place, gold medalist(s)	Doina Melinte	Romania	4:05.68	CR
2nd place, silver medalist(s)	Tatyana Samolenko	Soviet Union	4:07.08	PB
3rd place, bronze medalist(s)	Svetlana Kitova	Soviet Union	4:07.59	PB
4	Mitică Junghiatu	Romania	4:08.49	
5	Kirsty Wade	Great Britain	4:08.91	
6	Sandra Gasser	Switzerland	4:09.89	
7	Darlene Beckford	United States	4:13.64	
8	Nikolina Shtereva	Bulgaria	4:18.16	
9	Cristina Girón	Guatemala	4:56.98	NR
	Ivana Walterová	Czechoslovakia	DNF	
