= Beate Liebich =

German middle-distance runner

Personal information
- Nationality: German
- Born: 21 February 1958 (age 68)

Sport
- Sport: Middle-distance running
- Event: 1500 metres

Beate Liebich (born 21 February 1958) is a German middle-distance runner. She competed in the women's 1500 metres at the 1980 Summer Olympics, representing East Germany.
