= Athletics at the Friendship Games – Women's 3000 metres =

The women's 3000 metres event at the Friendship Games was held on 16 August 1984 at the Evžen Rošický Stadium in Prague, Czechoslovakia.

== Results ==
Rank	Name	Nationality	Time	Notes
1st place, gold medalist(s)	Tatyana Kazankina	Soviet Union	8:33.01	
2nd place, silver medalist(s)	Natalya Artyomova	Soviet Union	8:40.53	
3rd place, bronze medalist(s)	Olga Bondarenko	Soviet Union	8:43.74	
4	Katalin Szalai	Hungary	8:57.56	
5	Radka Naplatanova	Bulgaria	9:01.59	
6	Ivana Kleinová	Czechoslovakia	9:06.08	
7	Corinne Debaets	Belgium	9:07.79	
8	Rositsa Ekova	Bulgaria	9:11.07	
9	Susan Tooby	Great Britain	9:11.77	
10	Jana Červenková	Czechoslovakia	9:16.54	
11	Věra Nožičková	Czechoslovakia	9:29.52	
	Anni Müller	Austria	DNF	

== See also ==
- Athletics at the 1984 Summer Olympics – Women's 3000 metres
