= Ivana Kubešová =

Czechoslovak runner

Ivana Kubešová (née Kleinová, then Walterová; born 26 May 1962 in Šumperk) is a retired middle-distance runner who represented Czechoslovakia and later the Czech Republic. She won three medals at the European Indoor Championships as well as a silver medal at the 1991 IAAF World Indoor Championships.

== International competitions ==
| Year | Competition | Venue | Position | Event | Notes |
Representing Czechoslovakia
| 1983 | European Indoor Championships | Budapest, Hungary | 3rd | 1500 m | 4:17.21 |
| 1983 | World Championships | Helsinki, Finland | 11th | 1500 m | 4:15.12 |
| 1983 | World Championships | Helsinki, Finland | heats | 3000 m | 8:55.54 |
| 1984 | European Indoor Championships | Gothenburg, Sweden | 3rd | 3000 m | 9:15.71 |
| 1984 | Friendship Games | Prague, Czechoslovakia | 6th | 1500 m | 4:10.26 |
| 1984 | Friendship Games | Prague, Czechoslovakia | 6th | 3000 m | 9:06.08 |
| 1985 | European Indoor Championships | Piraeus, Greece | 7th | 1500 m | 4:14.80 |
| 1986 | European Championships | Stuttgart, Germany | 4th | 1500 m | 4:03.09 |
| 1987 | European Indoor Championships | Liévin, France | 3rd | 1500 m | 4:09.99 |
| 1987 | World Indoor Championships | Indianapolis, United States | – | 1500 m | DNF |
| 1991 | World Indoor Championships | Seville, Spain | 2nd | 1500 m | 4:06.22 |
| 1991 | World Championships | Tokyo, Japan | heats | 1500 m | 4:14.69 |
| 1992 | European Indoor Championships | Genoa, Italy | 7th | 1500 m | 4:09.43 |
