= 1987 European Athletics Indoor Championships – Women's 1500 metres =

International sporting competition

The women's 1500 metres event at the 1987 European Athletics Indoor Championships was held on 22 February.

== Results ==
Rank	Name	Nationality	Time	Notes
1st place, gold medalist(s)	Sandra Gasser	Switzerland	4:08.76	
2nd place, silver medalist(s)	Svetlana Kitova	Soviet Union	4:09.01	
3rd place, bronze medalist(s)	Ivana Walterová	Czechoslovakia	4:09.99	
4	Katrin Wühn	East Germany	4:10.70	
5	Nikolina Shtereva	Bulgaria	4:14.92	
6	Uta Eckhardt	West Germany	4:17.79	
7	Nathalie Froget	France	4:18.56	NR
8	Christine Hanon	France	4:21.89	
9	Mayte Zúñiga	Spain	4:24.13	
	Anne-Jorun Flaten	Norway	DNS	
