= 1985 European Athletics Indoor Championships – Women's 3000 metres =

The women's 3000 metres event at the 1985 European Athletics Indoor Championships was held on 3 March.

== Results ==
Rank	Name	Nationality	Time	Notes
1st place, gold medalist(s)	Agnese Possamai	Italy	8:55.25	
2nd place, silver medalist(s)	Olga Bondarenko	Soviet Union	8:58.03	
3rd place, bronze medalist(s)	Yvonne Murray	Great Britain	9:00.94	
4	Birgit Schmidt	West Germany	9:06.85	
5	Eva Jurková	Czechoslovakia	9:14.17	
6	Ľudmila Melicherová	Czechoslovakia	9:19.17	
7	Rossitza Ekova	Bulgaria	9:23.24	
	Brigitte Kraus	West Germany	DNS	
