= 1984 European Athletics Indoor Championships – Women's 3000 metres =

The women's 3000 metres event at the 1984 European Athletics Indoor Championships was held on 3 March.

== Results ==
Rank	Name	Nationality	Time	Notes
1st place, gold medalist(s)	Brigitte Kraus	West Germany	9:12.07	
2nd place, silver medalist(s)	Tetyana Pozdnyakova	Soviet Union	9:15.04	
3rd place, bronze medalist(s)	Ivana Kubešová	Czechoslovakia	9:15.71	
4	Monika Schäfer	West Germany	9:16.61	
5	Agnese Possamai	Italy	9:17.90	
6	Birgitta Wåhlin	Sweden	9:26.80	
