= 1979 European Athletics Indoor Championships – Women's 1500 metres =

The women's 1500 metres event at the 1979 European Athletics Indoor Championships was held on 25 February in Vienna.

== Results ==
| Rank | Name | Nationality | Time | Notes |
|---|---|---|---|---|
| 1st place, gold medalist(s) | Natalia Mărășescu | Romania | 4:03.5 | CR |
| 2nd place, silver medalist(s) | Zamira Zaytseva | Soviet Union | 4:03.9 | NR |
| 3rd place, bronze medalist(s) | Svetlana Guskova | Soviet Union | 4:07.4 | PB |
| 4 | Brigitte Kraus | West Germany | 4:09.7 | SB |
| 5 | Rumyana Chavdarova | Bulgaria | 4:11.6 | SB |
| 6 | Breda Pergar | Yugoslavia | 4:13.8 | NR |
| 7 | Cherry Hanson | Great Britain | 4:13.8 | PB |
| | Doris Weilharter | Austria | DNF | |
