= Marcellina Emmanuel =

Tanzanian middle-distance runner

Personal information
- Nationality: Tanzanian
- Born: 7 November 1964 (age 61)

Sport
- Sport: Middle-distance running
- Event: 1500 metres

Marcellina Emmanuel (born 7 November 1964) is a Tanzanian middle-distance runner. She competed in the women's 1500 metres at the 1980 Summer Olympics.
