= 1976 European Athletics Indoor Championships – Women's 1500 metres =

The women's 1500 metres event at the 1976 European Athletics Indoor Championships was held on 22 February in Munich.

== Results ==
Rank	Name	Nationality	Time	Notes
1st place, gold medalist(s)	Brigitte Kraus	West Germany	4:15.2	
2nd place, silver medalist(s)	Natalia Mărășescu	Romania	4:15.6	
3rd place, bronze medalist(s)	Rositsa Pekhlivanova	Bulgaria	4:15.8	
4	Sonja Castelein	Belgium	4:21.8	
5	Rumyana Chavdarova	Bulgaria	4:21.9	
6	Cornelia Bürki	Switzerland	4:22.0	NR
7	Lyudmila Bragina	Soviet Union	4:23.9	
8	Vesela Yatsinska	Bulgaria	4:24.1	
9	Czesława Surdel	Poland	4:25.2	
