= Svetlana Guskova =

Moldovan runner (born 1957)

Personal information
- Born: 19 August 1957 (age 68) Mykolaiv, Soviet Union

Sport
- Sport: Track and field
Medal record
Representing Soviet Union
European Indoor Championships
Bronze medal – third place	1979 Vienna	1500 m
Summer Universiade
Silver medal – second place	1985 Kobe	10,000m

Svetlana Guskova (born 19 August 1957) is a Moldovan runner who competed for the Soviet Union.

She was born in Mykolaiv. She won the bronze medal in 1500 metres at the 1979 European Indoor Championships. In 1982 she recorded a time of 3:57.05 minutes in the distance, as well as 8:29.36 minutes in the 3000 metres.

In 1986 she finished fifth in the 10,000 metres at the 1986 European Championships. 31:42.43 minutes was a career best time. She also recorded 15:02.12 minutes in the 5000 metres.

== Achievements ==
Year	Competition	Venue	Position	Event	Notes
Representing Soviet Union
1986	European Championships	Stuttgart, West Germany	5th	10,000 m	31:42.43
