= Athletics at the 1985 Summer Universiade – Women's 1500 metres =

The women's 1500 metres event at the 1985 Summer Universiade was held at the Kobe Universiade Memorial Stadium in Kobe on 29 and 30 August 1985.

== Medalists ==
Gold	Silver	Bronze
Svetlana Kitova; Soviet Union	Margareta Keszeg; Romania	Darlene Beckford; United States

== Results ==
=== Heats ===
Rank	Heat	Athlete	Nationality	Time	Notes
1	1	Alejandra Ramos	Chile	4:17.91	Q
2	1	Florence Giolitti	France	4:18.02	Q
3	1	Darlene Beckford	United States	4:18.08	Q
4	1	Ulla Marquette	Canada	4:18.33	Q
5	1	Asunción Sinovas	Spain	4:18.48	Q
6	1	Ella Kovacs	Romania	4:19.32	q
7	1	Roberta Brunet	Italy	4:19.72	q
8	2	Leann Warren	United States	4:20.25	Q
9	2	Svetlana Kitova	Soviet Union	4:20.32	Q
10	2	Angela Chalmers	Canada	4:20.71	Q
11	2	Margareta Keszeg	Romania	4:20.81	Q
12	2	Annette Sergent	France	4:21.17	Q
13	2	Vesna Bajer	Yugoslavia	4:22.98	
14	2	Fatima Aouam	Morocco	4:25.00	
15	1	Mirela Šket	Yugoslavia	4:36.14	
16	2	Yukiko Tajima	Japan	4:37.66	

=== Final ===
Rank	Athlete	Nationality	Time	Notes
1st place, gold medalist(s)	Svetlana Kitova	Soviet Union	4:07.12	
2nd place, silver medalist(s)	Margareta Keszeg	Romania	4:07.55	
3rd place, bronze medalist(s)	Darlene Beckford	United States	4:08.84	
4	Ulla Marquette	Canada	4:11.58	
5	Angela Chalmers	Canada	4:12.13	
6	Alejandra Ramos	Chile	4:13.09	
7	Annette Sergent	France	4:16.40	
8	Florence Giolitti	France	4:17.17	
9	Leann Warren	United States	4:17.77	
10	Asunción Sinovas	Spain	4:19.97	
11	Roberta Brunet	Italy	4:19.99	
	Ella Kovacs	Romania	DNF	
