= 1990 European Athletics Indoor Championships =

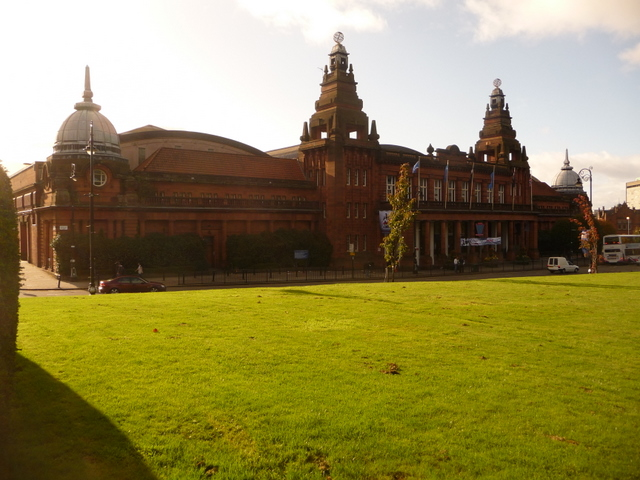
- Kelvin Hall, the host venue
- Dates: 3–4 March
- Host city: Glasgow, Scotland; United Kingdom
- Venue: Kelvin Hall International Sports Arena
- Events: 25
- Participation: 377 athletes from 28 nations

The 1990 European Athletics Indoor Championships were held in Glasgow, United Kingdom, on 3 and 4 March 1990. It was the last time that the event had been held annually and not biennially as it is now, as well as the last time that it was held over only two days. It also marked the debut of the women's triple jump event.

The medal table was topped by the Soviet Union, followed by West and East Germany.

== Medal summary ==
=== Men ===
Event	Gold		Silver		Bronze	
60 metres	Linford Christie (GBR)	6.56	Pierfrancesco Pavoni (ITA)	6.59	Jiří Valík (TCH)	6.63
200 metres	Sandro Floris (ITA)	21.01	Nikolay Antonov (BUL)	21.04	Bruno Marie-Rose (FRA)	21.28
400 metres	Norbert Dobeleit (FRG)	46.08	Jens Carlowitz (GDR)	46.09	Cayetano Cornet (ESP)	46.01
800 metres	Tom McKean (GBR)	1:46.22	Tomás de Teresa (ESP)	1:47.22	Zbigniew Janus (POL)	1:47.37
1500 metres	Jens-Peter Herold (GDR)	3:44.39	Fermín Cacho (ESP)	3:44.61	Tony Morrell (GBR)	3:44.83
3000 metres	Eric Dubus (FRA)	7:53.94	Jacky Carlier (FRA)	7:54.75	Branko Zorko (YUG)	7:54.77
60 metres hurdles	Igors Kazanovs (URS)	7.52	Tony Jarrett (GBR)	7.58	Florian Schwarthoff (FRG)	7.61
5000 metres walk	Mikhail Shchennikov (URS)	19:00.62	Giovanni De Benedictis (ITA)	19:02.90	Axel Noack (GDR)	19:08.36
High jump	Artur Partyka (POL)	2.33	Arturo Ortiz (ESP)	2.30	Dietmar Mögenburg (FRG); Gerd Nagel (FRG)	2.30
Pole vault	Rodion Gataullin (URS)	5.80	Grigoriy Yegorov (URS)	5.75	Hermann Fehringer (AUT); Thierry Vigneron (FRA)	5.70
Long jump	Dietmar Haaf (FRG)	8.11	Emiel Mellaard (NED)	8.08	Robert Emmiyan (URS)	8.06
Triple jump	Igor Lapshin (URS)	17.14	Oleg Sakirkin (URS)	16.70	Tord Henriksson (SWE)	16.69
Shot put	Klaus Bodenmüller (AUT)	21.03 NR	Ulf Timmermann (GDR)	20.43	Oliver-Sven Buder (GDR)	20.20

=== Women ===
Event	Gold		Silver		Bronze	
60 metres	Ulrike Sarvari (FRG)	7.10	Laurence Bily (FRA)	7.13	Nelli Fiere-Cooman (NED)	7.14
200 metres	Ulrike Sarvari (FRG)	22.96	Natalya Kovtun (URS)	23.01	Galina Malchugina (URS)	23.04
400 metres	Marina Shmonina (URS)	51.22	Iolanda Oanta (ROM)	52.22	Judit Forgács (HUN)	53.02
800 metres	Lyubov Gurina (URS)	2:01.63	Sabine Zwiener (FRG)	2:02.23	Lorraine Baker (GBR)	2:02.42
1500 metres	Doina Melinte (ROM)	4:09.73	Sandra Gasser (SUI)	4:10.13	Violeta Beclea (ROM)	4:10.44
3000 metres	Elly van Hulst (NED)	8:57.28	Margareta Keszeg (ROM)	8:57.50	Andrea Hahmann (GDR)	9:00.31
60 metres hurdles	Lyudmila Narozhilenko (URS)	7.74	Monique Ewanjé-Épée (FRA)	7.84	Mihaela Pogăcean (ROM)	7.99
3000 metres walk	Beate Anders (GDR)	11:59.36	Ileana Salvador (ITA)	12:18.84	Annarita Sidoti (ITA)	12:27.94
High jump	Heike Redetzky (FRG)	2.00	Britta Vörös (GDR)	1.94	Galina Astafei (ROM)	1.94
Long jump	Galina Chistyakova (URS)	6.85	Olena Khlopotnova (URS)	6.74	Helga Radtke (GDR)	6.66
Triple jump	Galina Chistyakova (URS)	14.14	Helga Radtke (GDR)	13.63	Ana Isabel Oliveira (POR)	13.44
Shot put	Claudia Losch (FRG)	20.64	Natalya Lisovskaya (URS)	20.35	Grit Hammer (GDR)	19.34

== Medal table ==
Rank	Nation	Gold	Silver	Bronze	Total
1	Soviet Union (URS)	9	5	2	16
2	West Germany (FRG)	5	1	3	9
3	East Germany (GDR)	2	4	5	11
4	France (FRA)	2	3	2	7
5	Great Britain (GBR)	2	1	2	5
6	Italy (ITA)	1	3	1	5
7	Romania (ROM)	1	2	3	6
8	Netherlands (NED)	1	1	1	3
9	Austria (AUT)	1	0	1	2
9	Poland (POL)	1	0	1	2
11	Spain (ESP)	0	3	1	4
12	Bulgaria (BUL)	0	1	0	1
12	Switzerland (SUI)	0	1	0	1
14	Czechoslovakia (TCH)	0	0	1	1
14	Hungary (HUN)	0	0	1	1
14	Portugal (POR)	0	0	1	1
14	Yugoslavia (YUG)	0	0	1	1
Totals (17 entries)		25	25	26	76

== Participating nations ==
- Andorra (1)
- Austria (8)
- Belgium (4)
- Bulgaria (7)
- Cyprus (3)
- Czechoslovakia (20)
- Denmark (2)
- East Germany (21)
- Finland (6)
- France (23)
- Great Britain (49)
- Greece (12)
- Hungary (12)
- Iceland (3)
- Ireland (8)
- Italy (31)
- Netherlands (4)
- Norway (6)
- Poland (7)
- Portugal (13)
- Romania (13)
- Soviet Union (28)
- Spain (32)
- Sweden (13)
- Switzerland (4)
- Turkey (3)
- West Germany (40)
- Yugoslavia (6)

== See also ==
- 1990 in athletics (track and field)
