= Janet Marlow =

British middle-distance runner

Janet Marlow née Lawrence
Personal information
- Nationality: British (English)
- Born: 9 December 1958 (age 67) St. Helens, England
- Height: 165 cm (5 ft 5 in)
- Weight: 55 kg (121 lb)

Sport
- Sport: Athletics
- Event: Middle-distance running
- Club: Stretford AC

Janet Marlow, née Lawrence (born 9 December 1958) is a British former middle-distance runner who competed at the 1980 Summer Olympics.

== Biography ==
Lawrence went to the Central Secondary School, and the sixth form at the Cowley School in St Helens, Merseyside.

Lawrence finished second behind Penny Yule in the 1500 metres event at the 1977 WAAA Championships.

Lawrence married Steve Marlow in early 1978 aged 19 and competed under her married name thereafter.

At the 1980 Olympics Games in Moscow, Marlow represented Great Britain in the women's 1500 metres event and the following year finished third behind Gillian Dainty at the 1981 WAAA Championships.
