= Diana Richburg =

American middle-distance runner

Personal information
- Born: July 2, 1963 (age 63) Troy, New York, United States

Sport
- Sport: Track and field

Diana Lynn Richburg (born July 2, 1963) is an American former middle-distance runner. She competed at the 1984 Los Angeles Olympics, and won the 1985 US national title at 1500 metres.

== Career ==
Born in Troy, New York, Richburg finished fourth in the 800m at the 1984 US Olympic Trials, before earning selection for the Los Angeles Olympics by finishing third in the 1500m in 4:04.07. At the Olympics, she failed to reach the final. She won the 1500m title at the 1985 USA Outdoor Track and Field Championships in 4:04.73.

Richburg achieved her lifetime best for 1500m when finishing seventh in the 1987 World Championship final, running 4:01.79. The following year, she missed out on Olympic selection when she finished sixth in the 1500m at the 1988 US Olympic Trials in 4:09.68.

At the 1992 US Olympic Trials, Richburg won her 800m heat in 2:01.28, but failed to reach the final after finishing seventh in her semifinal in 2:05.06.

== International competitions ==
| Year | Competition | Venue | Position | Event | Notes |
Representing United States
| 1983 | Universiade | Edmonton, Canada | 5th | 800 m | 2:02.32 |
| 1983 | Pan American Games | Caracas, Venezuela | 6th | 800 m | 2:05.29 |
| 1984 | Olympic Games | Los Angeles, United States | 14th (h) | 1500 m | 4:13.35 |
| 1987 | World Indoor Championships | Indianapolis, United States | 8th | 800 m | 2:05.86 |
| 1987 | Pan American Games | Indianapolis, United States | 5th | 1500 m | 4:15.04 |
| 1987 | World Championships | Rome, Italy | 7th | 1500 m | 4:01.79 |
(h) Indicates overall position in qualifying heats
