= Athletics at the 1991 Pan American Games – Women's 1500 metres =

Women's 1500 metres at the Pan American Games

The women's 1500 metres event at the 1991 Pan American Games was held in Havana, Cuba on 11 August.

== Results ==
Rank	Name	Nationality	Time	Notes
1st place, gold medalist(s)	Alisa Hill	United States	4:13.12	
2nd place, silver medalist(s)	Letitia Vriesde	Suriname	4:16.75	
3rd place, bronze medalist(s)	Sarah Howell	Canada	4:17.95	
4	Soraya Telles	Brazil	4:22.21	
5	Maura Savón	Cuba	4:25.04	
6	Mabel Arrúa	Argentina	4:27.87	
7	Milagro Rodríguez	Cuba	4:30.56	
8	Linda Sheskey	United States	4:31.59	
9	Angelita Lind	Puerto Rico	4:34.00	
10	Donna Bean	Bermuda	4:36.30	
11	Bigna Samuel	Saint Vincent and the Grenadines	4:36.64	
12	Niusha Mancilla	Bolivia	4:44.90	
