= Lyubov Smolka =

Ukrainian former track and field athlete (born 1952)

Medal record

Women's athletics

Representing the Soviet Union

European Indoor Championships
Bronze medal – third place	1981 Grenoble	1500 m

Lyubov Smolka (née Ruchkova; Ukrainian: Любовь Смолка-Ручкова; born 29 November 1952) is a Ukrainian former track and field athlete who competed in the 1500 metres for the Soviet Union.

Born in Pavlohrad, Ukrainian SSR, she had her breakthrough performance in Moscow in 1980, taking second place in the 1500 m to Tatyana Kazankina, who broke the world record. Smolka was two seconds behind with 3:56.7 minutes, though this was enough to make her the second fastest woman ever at that point. Her time, as of 2016, still ranks her within the all-time top thirty athletes for the event.

Smolka ranked third at the Soviet Athletics Championships and was chosen for the 1980 Moscow Olympics as a result. She reached the final at the Moscow Games and placed sixth in the 1500 metres final. That year she also set a best in the 3000 metres with 8:36.0 minutes. Her sole international medal came at the 1981 European Athletics Indoor Championships, where she was bronze medallist in the 1500 m, behind Italy's Agnese Possamai and fellow Soviet Valentina Ilyinykh.

Later in her career, she was fourth in the 3000 m at the 1984 Soviet Championships and runner-up at the 1985 Soviet Championships, but never again competed at a major international championship.

== International competitions ==
Year	Competition	Venue	Position	Event	Notes
1980	Olympic Games	Moscow, Soviet Union	6th	1500 m	4:01.3
1981	European Indoor Championships	Grenoble, France	3rd	1500 m	4:08.64
