= No Hye-sun =

South Korean middle-distance runner

Personal information
- Nationality: South Korean
- Born: 23 March 1969 (age 57)

Sport
- Sport: Middle-distance running
- Event: 1500 metres

No Hye-sun (born 23 March 1969) is a South Korean middle-distance runner. She competed in the women's 1500 metres at the 1988 Summer Olympics.
