= Missy Kane =

American middle-distance runner

Personal information
- Nationality: American
- Born: June 21, 1955 (age 71) Nashville, Tennessee, United States

Sport
- Sport: Middle-distance running
- Event: 1500 metres
Medal record
Representing United States
Pan American Games
Bronze medal – third place	1983 Caracas	1500m

Missy Kane (born June 21, 1955) is an American middle-distance runner. She competed in the women's 1500 metres at the 1984 Summer Olympics.
