= Roswitha Gerdes =

German middle-distance runner (born 1961)

Personal information
- Nationality: German
- Born: 28 June 1961 (age 65)

Sport
- Sport: Middle-distance running
- Event: 1500 metres

Roswitha Gerdes (born 28 June 1961) is a German middle-distance runner. She competed in the women's 1500 metres at the 1984 Summer Olympics.
