= Zamira Zaytseva =

Soviet middle-distance runner

Medal record

Women's athletics

Representing Soviet Union

European Championships
| Silver medal – second place | 1982 Athens | 1500 m |

European Indoor Championships
| Silver medal – second place | 1979 Vienna | 1500 m |

Zamira Khamatkhanovna Zaytseva, née Akhtyamova, (Russian: Замира Хаматхановна Зайцева; Uzbek: Zamira Hamatxanovna Zayseva; born February 16, 1953) is a retired middle-distance runner who represented the USSR. She was born in Oltinkoʻl, Uzbek SSR.

Her achievements include three championship silver medals over 1500 metres.

Her personal best times are 1:56.21 (800 metres) and 3:56.14 (1500 metres).

== International competitions ==
| Year | Competition | Venue | Position | Event | Notes |
|---|---|---|---|---|---|
| 1979 | European Indoor Championships | Vienna, Austria | 2nd | 1500 metres | 4:03.9 NR |
| 1982 | European Championships | Athens, Greece | 2nd | 1500 metres | 3:58.82 |
| 1983 | World Championships | Helsinki, Finland | 2nd | 1500 metres | 4:01.19 |
| 1985 | European Cup | Moscow, Soviet Union | 2nd | 3000 m | 8:35.74 |
