= Christina Boxer =

English middle-distance runner

Christina Cahill née Boxer
Personal information
- Nationality: British (English)
- Born: 25 March 1957 (age 69) Northolt, Greater London, England
- Height: 166 cm (5 ft 5 in)
- Weight: 51 kg (112 lb)

Sport
- Sport: Athletics
- Event: middle-distance
- Club: Aldershot, Farnham and District AC; Gateshead Harriers
Medal record
Women's athletics
Representing England
Commonwealth Games
Gold medal – first place	1982 Brisbane	1500 m
Silver medal – second place	1990 Auckland	1500 m

Christina Tracy Cahill née Boxer (born 25 March 1957) is a female retired middle distance athlete from England. She represented Great Britain at three Olympic Games, in Moscow 1980, Los Angeles 1984 and Seoul 1988 and trained at Aldershot, Farnham & District AC. In Seoul, she finished fourth in the 1500 metres final. She also won a gold medal in the 1500 m at the 1982 Commonwealth Games. In 1979, she became the first British woman in history to run the 800 metres in under two-minutes.

== Education ==
Yateley School/Farnborough College (1968–1976); Loughborough University (1979–1983); Chichester University (2003–2004)

== Career ==
Boxer was born in Northolt, Middlesex, England and was a member of Aldershot, Farnham and District Athletic Club and later Gateshead Harriers. In 1971, she won the Under 15 English National Cross Country Championships.

Boxer became British 800 metres champion after winning the British WAAA Championships title at the 1977 WAAA Championships in 2:03.78. The following year she retained the 800 metres title at the 1978 WAAA Championships.

In August 1979, Boxer became the first British woman to run 800 metres in under two minutes, with a time of 1:59.05 in Turin. She still remains one of only five British woman, along with Kirsty Wade, Hannah England, Laura Muir and Jessica Warner-Judd, to have broken both two minutes for 800 metres and nine minutes for 3000 metres. She gained a BSc in Physical Education and Sport Science and a PGCE in PE & Biology at Loughborough University between 1979 and 1983. During this time, she competed at her first Olympic Games in Moscow 1980, reaching the semi-finals of the 800 m.

In 1982, Boxer became British 1500 metres champion after winning the British WAAA Championships title at the 1982 WAAA Championships and shortly afterwards won the gold medal in the women's 1500 m event at the Commonwealth Games in Brisbane.

On 6 July 1984, Boxer achieved her career best of 4:00.57 in the 1500 m at Gateshead, to break Christine Benning's five-year-old British record. A month later, at the Los Angeles Olympics, she finished 6th in the 1500 m final with 4:05.53. She ended the season running a career best time in the mile, with 4:22.64 in London. Although she lost her British 1500 m record to Zola Budd, who ran 3:59.96 in Brussels, Boxer had another fine season in 1985. She ran her best ever time in the 3000 m, with 8:49.89 at the Crystal Palace and finished second in the 1500 m at the European Cup in Moscow, behind Raviliya Agletdinova of the Soviet Union, in addition to regaining the 800 metres title at the 1985 WAAA Championships.

Boxer married Sean Cahill in 1986 and competed under her married name thereafter. Boxer returned to top form in 1988, competing at her third Olympics in Seoul, South Korea, (under her then married name of Cahill), she finished 4th in the 1500 m final, with her best time for four years, 4:00.64. She was beaten into bronze by Tetyana Samolenko, who was later banned for taking performance-enhancing drugs. She was the fifth fastest woman in the world in 1988 at 1500m.

In 1990, Cahill won a Commonwealth Games silver medal in the 1500 m behind Canada's Angela Chalmers. In 1992, she competed at the UK Olympic trials in Birmingham but missed out on selection for a fourth consecutive Olympic Games in Barcelona. She retired as an international athlete later that year.

As of 2021, Cahill still ranks in the UK all-time top ten at 1500 m and the mile. She ranks ninth in the 1500 m (4:00.57) and eighth in the mile (4:22.64). In the 800 m, she ranks 16th (1:59.05).

== Later career ==
After her retirement she worked as a Sport, Physical Activity & Education Consultant leading national projects involving health-activity and sport retention programmes, while also coaching worldclass senior and junior athletes including Jo Pavey, whom she helped return from serious injury to make her first ever Olympics in 2000 at 5,000m and Charlotte Moore who became the first British junior woman to break 2 minutes at 800m, setting a UK junior record of 1.59.75 when finishing 6th in the 2002 Commonwealth Games and gained a silver medal at the European Junior Championships in 2003.

Boxer was also a reporter for BBC Sport's athletics coverage from 1996 to 2001, providing track-side interviews at major events including the Commonwealth Games, World Track & Cross Country Championships and the Sydney Olympic Games. She became a middle distance Team GB coach during the early – mid 2000s.

Boxer continued to combine consultancy work with formal employment contracts and project management and has held honorary positions promoting sport and coaching. She was board director of sportscoachUK from 1998 to 2007, a sporting patron of the Youth Sport Trust from 1992 to 2006 and a London2012 Olympic and Paralympic Ambassador in the West Midlands from 2009 to 2012. After completing a MSc in Sport & Exercise Psychology and a Diploma in Behavioural Coaching she became Course Leader of BSc in Sports Coaching Science and Senior Lecturer (Coaching with PE & Sport Development) at the University of Worcester before being appointed Director of Girl's Sport/Sport Development at Malvern College in 2008. In 2011, she became Sports Development Manager at the University of Birmingham managing staff and programmes involving Coaching, Club Development, Participation and Volunteering. and was also appointed Chair of the Birmingham Athletic Network. From 2014 to 2016 Christina worked as Director of Sport and Community Development at Queen Anne's School in Caversham before returning to the West Midlands, developing sport across the full spectrum from health-related fitness through to performance team and individual sports.

In 2018 she was working for Warwick District Council helping them to prepare for the 2022 Commonwealth Games. Whilst the games will primarily be held in Birmingham, the bowls events will take place in Victoria Park, Leamington Spa, the town which houses Bowls England and hosts the national bowling championships annually.

== Achievements ==
- 5 Times AAAs National Champion – 800 m (1977, 1978) 1500 m (1982, 1988, 1990)
- 5 Times UK National Champion – 800 m (1979, 1980, 1984, 1988) 1500 m (1986)
- AAAs Indoor Champion – 1500 m (1992)

Year	Competition	Venue	Position	Event	Notes
Representing Great Britain / England
1978	Commonwealth Games	Edmonton, Canada	11th	1500 m	4:26.14
1979	European Cup	Turin, Italy	6th	800 m	1:59.05
1980	Olympic Games	Moscow, Russia	semi-final	800 m	2:00.9
1981	Universiade	Bucharest, Romania	6th (h)	800 m	2:02.50
1982	Commonwealth Games	Brisbane, Australia	1st	1500 m	4:08.28
1983	World Championships	Helsinki, Finland	9th	1500 m	4:06.74
1984	Olympic Games	Los Angeles, United States	6th	1500 m	4:05.53
1985	European Cup	Moscow, Russia	2nd	1500 m	4:02.58
1986	Commonwealth Games	Edinburgh, Scotland	4th	1500 m	4:12.84
1986	European Championships	Stuttgart, West Germany	heats	1500 m	4:07.74
1988	Olympic Games	Seoul, South Korea	4th	1500 m	4:00.64
1990	Commonwealth Games	Auckland, New Zealand	2nd	1500 m	4:08.71
1990	European Championships	Split, Yugoslavia	10th	1500 m	4:14.48
1991	World Championships	Tokyo, Japan	heats	1500 m	4:09.01
1992	European Indoor Championships	Genoa, Italy	heats	1500 m	4:14.46
