= Linda Sheskey =

American middle-distance runner

Personal information
- Born: October 18, 1962 (age 63)

Sport
- Sport: Track and field
- College team: Georgia Bulldogs
Medal record
Representing United States
Pan American Games
Gold medal – first place	1987 Indianapolis	800m

Linda Sheskey (born Linda Detlefsen on October 18, 1962, nka Linda Nicosia) is a retired middle-distance runner from the United States. She competed in the 1980s and 90s for her native country. While running for the University of Georgia, she became the first women's NCAA champion for that school. She was the 1986 National Champion at 1500 meters. She was also the 1989 Indoor champion both times representing Athletics West. Sheskey set her personal best in the women's 1,500 metres event (4:04.89) on July 16, 1987, at the Meeting de Paris in Paris, France. Later that year she was the Pan American Games champion.

== International competitions ==
Year	Competition	Venue	Position	Event	Notes
Representing the United States
1986	Goodwill Games	Moscow, Soviet Union	8th	1500 m	4:10.92
1987	Pan American Games	Indianapolis, United States	1st	1500 m	4:07.84
1987	World Championships	Rome, Italy	10th	1500 m	4:08.33
1990	Goodwill Games	Seattle, United States	8th	1500 m	4:14.96
1991	Pan American Games	Havana, Cuba	8th	1500 m	4:31.59

== National titles ==
- USA Outdoor Track and Field Championships
  - 1500 m: 1986
