= Lynne MacDougall =

Scottish long-distance runner

Personal information
- Born: 18 February 1965 (age 61) Glasgow, Scotland

Sport
- Sport: Middle and long-distance running
- Event: 1500 metres

Lynne MacDougall (born 18 February 1965) is a Scottish middle-distance and long-distance runner. She represented Great Britain at the 1984 Los Angeles Olympics, finishing 11th in the 1500 metres final. Representing Scotland and competing as Lynne MacIntyre, she finished fifth in the 1500m final at the 1990 Commonwealth Games.

== Career ==
Born Lynne MacDougall in Glasgow, Scotland, she finished fourth in the 1500 metres at the 1983 European Junior Championships. In 1984, she won the AAA Indoor Championship 1500m title and finished second behind Zola Budd in the 1500m at the 1984 UK Championships. She went on to finish 11th in the 1500m final at that years Los Angeles Olympics. She then finished eighth in the 1500m final at the 1986 Commonwealth Games.

Competing under her then married name of MacIntyre, she finished second in the 1500m finals at the 1988 and 1989 AAA Indoor Championships, and won the 1500m title at the 1989 UK Championships. She finished fifth in the 1500m final at the 1990 Commonwealth Games.

Later in her career, once again competing as Lynne MacDougall, she moved up to longer distances and ran 2:37:20 to finish 16th at the 2001 London Marathon. She improved her marathon best to 2:36:29 when finishing second at the 2002 Seville Marathon.

== International competitions ==
Year	Competition	Venue	Position	Event	Notes
Representing Great Britain
1983	European Junior Championships	Schwechat, Austria	4th	1500 m	4:15.39
1984	Olympic Games	Los Angeles, United States	11th	1500 m	4:10.58
Representing Scotland
1986	Commonwealth Games	Edinburgh, United Kingdom	8th	1500 m	4:17.25
1990	Commonwealth Games	Auckland, New Zealand	5th	1500 m	4:09.75
