= Svetlana Kitova =

Soviet middle-distance runner

Personal information
- Born: 25 June 1960 Dushanbe, Soviet Union
- Died: 18 November 2015 (aged 55)

Sport
- Sport: Track and field
Medal record
Representing Soviet Union
World Indoor Championships
| Silver medal – second place | 1989 Budapest | 1500m |
| Bronze medal – third place | 1987 Indianapolis | 1500m |
European Indoor Championships
| Gold medal – first place | 1983 Budapest | 800m |
| Gold medal – first place | 1986 Madrid | 1500m |
| Silver medal – second place | 1987 Lievin | 1500m |
| Bronze medal – third place | 1989 The Hague | 1500m |
Summer Universiade
| Gold medal – first place | 1985 Kobe | 1500m |
| Silver medal – second place | 1987 Zagreb | 1500m |

Svetlana Alexandrovna Kitova (Russian: Светлана Александровна Китова; 25 June 1960 – 18 November 2015) was a middle-distance runner who represented the USSR and later Russia. Born in Dushanbe, Kitova's greatest achievements were the 1989 World Indoor silver medal as well as two European Indoor gold medals. Her personal best 1500 metres time was 4:01.02 in Kiev on 2 August 1988.

== International competitions ==
| Year | Competition | Venue | Position | Event | Notes |
Representing Soviet Union
| 1983 | European Indoor Championships | Budapest, Hungary | 1st | 800 m | 2:01.28 |
| 1985 | Universiade | Kobe, Japan | 1st | 1500 m | 4:07.12 |
| 1986 | European Indoor Championships | Madrid, Spain | 1st | 1500 m | 4:14.25 |
| 1986 | European Championships | Stuttgart, Germany | 6th | 1500 m | 4:04.74 |
| 1987 | European Indoor Championships | Lievin, France | 2nd | 1500 m | 4:09.01 |
| 1987 | World Indoor Championships | Indianapolis, United States | 3rd | 1500 m | 4:07.59 |
| 1987 | Universiade | Zagreb, Yugoslavia | 2nd | 1500 m | 4:03.03 |
| 1987 | World Championships | Rome, Italy | 9th | 1500 m | 4:04.66 |
| 1989 | European Indoor Championships | The Hague, Netherlands | 3rd | 1500 m | 4:08.36 |
| 1989 | World Indoor Championships | Budapest, Hungary | 2nd | 1500 m | 4:05.71 |
