= Nadezhda Ralldugina =

Soviet distance runner

Nadezhda Ralldugina (born 15 November 1957) is a retired female middle distance runner who represented the USSR in the 1980s. She set her personal best in the women's 1,500 metres (3:56.63) on 1984-08-18 at a meet in Prague.

== Achievements ==
Year	Competition	Venue	Position	Event	Notes
Representing Soviet Union
1984	Friendship Games	Moscow, Soviet Union	1st	1500 m	3:56.63
