= Brit McRoberts =

Canadian middle-distance runner

Medal record

Women's athletics

Representing Canada

Pan American Games
Bronze medal – third place	1987 Indianapolis	1500 m

IAAF World Indoor Games
Bronze medal – third place	1985 Paris	1500 m

Brit Lind-Petersen-McRoberts (born 10 February 1957), also known as Brit Townsend, is a Canadian former track and field athlete who competed in middle-distance running events.

Born in Copenhagen in Denmark, she later moved to Canada and represented her adoptive country internationally. She made her first appearances for Canada in 1979, placing seventh in the 800 metres at the Pan American Games, then sixth in the 1500 metres at the 1979 IAAF World Cup. Her first national title came in 1980, over 1500 m at the Canadian Track and Field Championships, and she would go on to win three further titles (800 m in 1981 and 1983, then a second 1500 m title in 1986). She set Canadian National records at 800 meters (2:00.02) and 1500 meters (4:03.36) in the 1983 season. She also came first in the women's mile run at the USA Indoor Track and Field Championships in 1984, and broke the National outdoor mile record with a (4:24.61) in Nice, France in 1986. She was a gold medal favourite for the 1500 meters at the Commonwealth Games in 1986 with the fastest time in the Commonwealth heading into the Games but caught a virus that was going around the athletes' village and had to withdraw from the competition.

She won three major medals during her career, all over 1500 m: she was the gold medallist at the 1981 Pacific Conference Games, and claimed bronze at both the 1985 IAAF World Indoor Games and the 1987 Pan American Games. She was also an 800 m gold medallist at the Francophonie Games.

McRoberts was a finalist at multiple global events, including the 1983 World Championships in Athletics, 1984 Summer Olympics, and the 1986 and 1990 Commonwealth Games. She represented the Americas in two middle-distance events at the 1981 IAAF World Cup and ran for Canada at the 1987 World Championships in Athletics (failing to make the final).

McRoberts graduated from Simon Fraser University with a degree in Kinesiology and Communications and later returned there becoming the head coach of the track and field programme under her married name, Brit Townsend.

== International competitions ==
Year	Competition	Venue	Position	Event	Notes
1979	Pan American Games	San Juan, Puerto Rico	7th	800 m	2:06.7
1979	World Cup	Montreal, Quebec, Canada	6th	1500 m	4:15.33
1981	Pacific Conference Games	Christchurch, New Zealand	1st	1500 m	4:11.87
1981	Francophonie Games	Rabat, Morocco	1st	800 m	2:05.03
1981	World Cup	Rome, Italy	7th	800 m	2.02.19
1981	World Cup	Rome, Italy	6th	1500 m	4:09.66
1983	World Championships	Helsinki, Finland	8th	1500 m	4:05.73
1984	Olympic Games	Los Angeles, United States	7th	1500 m	4:05.98
1985	World Indoor Games	Paris, France	3rd	1500 m	4:11.83
1986	Commonwealth Games	Edinburgh, United Kingdom	7th	800 m	2:05.10
1987	World Championships	Rome, Italy	8th (heats)	1500 m	4:08.37
1987	Pan American Games	Indianapolis, United States	3rd	1500 m	4:11.35
1990	Commonwealth Games	Auckland, New Zealand	8th	800 m	2:07.40

== National titles ==
- Canadian Track and Field Championships
  - 800 m: 1981, 1983
  - 1500 m: 1980, 1986
- USA Indoor Track and Field Championships
  - Mile: 1984
