= 1983 World Championships in Athletics – Women's 1500 metres =

These are the official results of the Women's 1,500 metres event at the 1983 IAAF World Championships in Helsinki, Finland. There were a total number of 26 participating athletes, with three qualifying heats and the final held on Sunday 14th August 1983. The winning margin was 0.29 seconds.

The final was a microcosm of these championships. East vs West. The American Mary Decker vs a strong Soviet squad. Decker was so dominant in domestic competition, her races were won from the gun, so she was not well practiced in running elbow to elbow as the Soviets and other Europeans were highly skilled in the art. True to her form, Decker took the lead from the gun, with a large pack surrounding her. As the last lap approached Zamira Zaytseva moved onto Decker's shoulder, immediately to her outside. On the last lap, the pace quickened but Decker refused to let Zaytseva get all the way past. Finally with 200 metres to go, Zaytseva sprinted ahead and gained a couple of steps. Decker looked dejected, unable to keep up all the way through the turn but clearly ahead of Yekaterina Podkopayeva who was battling to stay ahead of Ravilya Agletdinova. On the final straight, Decker moved into lane 2 and started to make a run at Zaytseva, gaining slightly. About 50 metres out, Decker checked over her shoulder to see if any competition was approaching from the rear. Agletdinova-Kotovich was making a run at Podkopayeva several metres back but neither was gaining on Decker. Decker gritted her teeth and noticeably accelerated gaining on Zaytseva. As Decker moved past Zaytseva tried to accelerate. In the effort she started to lose her balance. Two awkward steps of flailing and reminiscent of Yevgeniy Arzhanov a decade earlier, Zaytseva dived for the finish line from four meters out. Clearly beaten by this point, Zaytseva executed a face plant a metre from the finish line and rolled across the line in second. Podkopayeva held off her teammate for bronze. The powerful Soviets all finished in the top four, but Decker was number one.

== Medalists ==
Gold	Mary Decker; United States (USA)
Silver	Zamira Zaytseva; Soviet Union (URS)
Bronze	Yekaterina Podkopayeva; Soviet Union (URS)

== Records ==
Existing records at the start of the event.

World record	Tatyana Kazankina (URS)	3:52.47	Zürich, Switzerland	August 13, 1980
Championship record	New event			

== Final ==
RANK	FINAL	TIME
	Mary Decker (USA)	4:00.90
	Zamira Zaytseva (URS)	4:01.19
	Yekaterina Podkopayeva (URS)	4:02.25
4.	Ravilya Agletdinova (URS)	4:02.67
5.	Wendy Sly (GBR)	4:04.14
6.	Doina Melinte (ROU)	4:04.42
7.	Gabriella Dorio (ITA)	4:04.73
8.	Brit McRoberts (CAN)	4:05.73
9.	Christina Boxer (GBR)	4:06.74
10.	Cornelia Bürki (SUI)	4:11.61
11.	Ivana Kleinová (TCH)	4:15.12
12.	Maria Radu (ROU)	4:19.03

== Qualifying heats ==
- Held on Friday 1983-08-12

RANK	HEAT 1	TIME
1.	Ravilya Agletdinova (URS)	4:10.71
2.	Ivana Kleinová (TCH)	4:10.82
3.	Brit McRoberts (CAN)	4:10.88
4.	Christiane Wartenberg (GDR)	4:10.89
5.	Totka Petrova (BUL)	4:12.31
6.	Cindy Bremser (USA)	4:14.10
7.	Kriscia García (ESA)	4:40.21
8.	Bigna Samuel (VIN)	4:51.35
9.	Kungu Bakombo (ZAI)	4:54.12

RANK	HEAT 2	TIME
1.	Mary Decker (USA)	4:07.47
2.	Zamira Zaytseva (URS)	4:07.64
3.	Wendy Sly (GBR)	4:08.16
4.	Cornelia Bürki (SUI)	4:08.61
5.	Maria Radu (ROU)	4:10.15
6.	Marcianne Mukamurenzi (RWA)	4:30.58
7.	Vivian Pearson (MAW)	5:03.70
	Aurora Cunha (POR)	DNS

RANK	HEAT 3	TIME
1.	Yekaterina Podkopayeva (URS)	4:09.39
2.	Gabriella Dorio (ITA)	4:09.45
3.	Doina Melinte (ROU)	4:09.71
4.	Christina Boxer (GBR)	4:09.88
5.	Betty Van Steenbroeck (BEL)	4:12.93
6.	Marjo-Riitta Lakka (FIN)	4:22.33
7.	Hala El Moughrabi (SYR)	4:45.62
8.	Khadija Al Matari (JOR)	5:01.83
	Brigitte Kraus (FRG)	DNS
