= Brigitte Kraus =

German middle-distance runner

Medal record

Women's athletics

Representing West Germany

European Indoor Championships
Gold medal – first place	1976 Munich	1500 m
Bronze medal – third place	1978 Milan	1500 m

Brigitte Kraus (born 12 August 1956 in Bensberg) is a retired West German middle-distance runner who specialized in the 1500 and 3000 metres.

She competed for the sports clubs LG Rhein-Berg and ASV Köln during her active career.

== International competitions ==
Year	Competition	Venue	Position	Event	Notes
Representing West Germany
1973	European Indoor Championships	Rotterdam, Netherlands	8th (h)	800 m	2:09.90
1973	European Junior Championships	Duisburg, Germany	9th	1500 m	4:23.97
1975	European Indoor Championships	Katowice, Poland	8th (h)	800 m	2:08.1
1976	European Indoor Championships	Munich, West Germany	1st	1500 m	4:15.2
1976	Olympic Games	Montreal, Canada	7th (sf)	1500 m	4:04.21
1978	European Indoor Championships	Milan, Italy	3rd	1500 m	4:07.6
1978	European Championships	Prague, Czechoslovakia	13th (h)	1500 m	4:11.9
1979	European Indoor Championships	Vienna, Austria	4th	1500 m	4:09.7
1982	European Indoor Championships	Milan, Italy	2nd	1500 m	4:04.22
1982	European Championships	Athens, Greece	7th	3000 m	8:51.60
1983	European Indoor Championships	Budapest, Hungary	1st	1500 m	4:16.14
1983	World Championships	Helsinki, Finland	2nd	3000 m	8:35.11
1984	European Indoor Championships	Gothenburg, Sweden	1st	3000 m	9:12.07
1984	Olympic Games	Los Angeles, United States	13th (h)	3000 m	8:57.53^{1}
1985	European Indoor Championships	Piraeus, Greece	3rd	1500 m	4:03.64
1985	European Indoor Championships	Piraeus, Greece	–	3000 m	DNF
1986	European Championships	Stuttgart, West Germany	–	3000 m	DNF
1987	European Indoor Championships	Liévin, France	3rd	3000 m	8:53.01
1987	World Indoor Championships	Indianapolis, United States	–	3000 m	DNF
1988	European Indoor Championships	Budapest, Hungary	3rd	1500 m	4:07.06

^{1}Did not finish in the final
