= Athletics at the 1988 Summer Olympics – Women's 1500 metres =

Women's 1500 metres at the Games of the XXIV Olympiad
- Venue: Olympic Stadium
- Dates: 28 September 1988 (heats); 1 October 1988 (final)
- Competitors: 28 from 19 nations
- Winning time: 3:53.96 OR

Medalists
1st place, gold medalist(s)		Paula Ivan; Romania
2nd place, silver medalist(s)		Laimutė Baikauskaitė; Soviet Union
3rd place, bronze medalist(s)		Tetyana Samolenko; Soviet Union

The women's 1500 metres at the 1988 Summer Olympics in Seoul, South Korea had an entry list of 28 competitors, with two qualifying heats (28) before the final (12) took place on Saturday October 1, 1988.

The winning margin was an astonishing 6.28 seconds which as of 2023 remains the only time the women's Olympic 1500 metres was won by more than two seconds.

From the gun in the final, Paula Ivan wanted the lead. Mary Slaney and Ivan's teammate Doina Melinte did not want to let her get away. The field behind her looked bunched but the 1:02.52 first lap showed she was serious. This was world record pace, rare for a championship race that usually breaks down into a strategic battle. After the first lap, a small gap began to open. Melinte was the last to maintain contact, perhaps having seen this strategy previously in domestic competition. The second lap was completed in 1:03.26, a ten-metre gap had opened, with Tetyana Samolenko edging past Melinte in chase. 2:52.66 at the bell and a fifteen-metre gap, Ivan began a last lap kick, trying to run the 60 second last lap to get the world record. Because of the acceleration, the third lap was the fastest of them all at 1:02.46. The battle was for the medals behind Ivan, Andrea Hahmann passing Samolenko, who had Christina Cahill on her shoulder with Lynn Williams in chase. Melinte faded back to Slaney but behind all of them, Laimutė Baikauskaitė was charging. Onto the home stretch the chase pack was tightening, some 30 metres behind Ivan. Baikauskaitė moved into lane 3 to find some running room. Ivan was unable to find a 60-second lap, but 61.5 was enough to set the Olympic record out of sight with a dominant gold medal performance. Hahmann faded and Samolenko was leading down the stretch with Cahill in close pursuit. Making up ten metres on the final straight, Baikauskaitė passed Cahill and Hahmann in the final 15 metres and leaned past Samolenko at the line to take the silver.

== Medalists ==
Gold	Paula Ivan; Romania
Silver	Laimutė Baikauskaitė; Soviet Union
Bronze	Tetyana Samolenko; Soviet Union

== Records ==
These were the standing world and Olympic records (in minutes) prior to the 1988 Summer Olympics.

World record	3:52.47	(Soviet Union) Tatyana Kazankina	Zürich (SUI)	August 13, 1980
Olympic record	3:56.56	(Soviet Union) Tatyana Kazankina	Moscow (URS)	August 1, 1980

The following Olympic record (in minutes) was set during this competition.

Date	Athlete	Time	OR	WR
September 26, 1988	Paula Ivan	Romania	3:53.96	OR

== Final ==
Rank	Athlete	Nation	Time	Notes
1st place, gold medalist(s)	Paula Ivan	Romania	3:53.96	OR
2nd place, silver medalist(s)	Laimutė Baikauskaitė	Soviet Union	4:00.24	
3rd place, bronze medalist(s)	Tetyana Samolenko	Soviet Union	4:00.30	
4	Christina Cahill	Great Britain	4:00.64	
5	Lynn Williams	Canada	4:00.86	
6	Andrea Hahmann	East Germany	4:00.96	
7	Shireen Bailey	Great Britain	4:02.32	
8	Mary Slaney	United States	4:02.49	
9	Doina Melinte	Romania	4:02.89	
10.	Fatima Aouam	Morocco	4:08.00	
11.	Kim Gallagher	United States	4:16.25	
12.	Debbie Bowker	Canada	4:17.95	

== Non-Qualifiers ==
Rank	Athlete	Nation	Time	Notes
13.	Elly van Hulst	Netherlands	4:07.40	
14.	Hassiba Boulmerka	Algeria	4:08.33	
15.	Kirsty Wade	Great Britain	4:08.37	
16.	Lyubov Gurina	Soviet Union	4:08.59	
17.	Angela Chalmers	Canada	4:08.64	
18.	Vera Michallek	West Germany	4:10.05	
19.	Susan Sirma	Kenya	4:10.13	
20.	Cornelia Bürki	Switzerland	4:10.89	
21.	Regina Jacobs	United States	4:18.09	
22.	Letitia Vriesde	Suriname	4:19.58	
23.	Khin Khin Htwe	Burma	4:20.92	
24.	No Hye-sun	South Korea	4:26.05	
25.	Daphrose Nyiramutuzo	Rwanda	4:32.31	
26.	Laverne Bryan	Antigua and Barbuda	4:39.73	
27.	Poloni Avek	Papua New Guinea	4:46.49	
28.	Rachel Thompson	Sierra Leone	5:31.42	

== See also ==
- 1987 Women's World Championships 1500 metres (Rome)
- 1990 Women's European Championships 1500 metres (Split)
- 1991 Women's World Championships 1500 metres (Tokyo)
- 1992 Women's Olympic 1500 metres (Barcelona)
