= Kirsty Wade =

British middle-distance runner (born 1962)

Kirsty Wade née McDermott
Personal information
- Nationality: British
- Born: 6 August 1962 (age 64) Girvan, Scotland
- Height: 169 cm (5 ft 7 in)
- Weight: 56 kg (8 st 11 lb)

Sport
- Sport: Athletics
- Event: middle-distance
- Club: Brecon Athletic Club; Bristol AC; Blaydon Harriers
Medal record
Women's athletics
Representing Wales
Commonwealth Games
Gold medal – first place	1982 Brisbane	800 m
Gold medal – first place	1986 Edinburgh	800 m
Gold medal – first place	1986 Edinburgh	1500 m

Kirsty Margaret Wade (née McDermott, born 6 August 1962) is a British former middle-distance runner. She is a three-time Commonwealth Games gold medallist, winning the 800 metres in Brisbane 1982 and both the 800 metres and 1500 metres in Edinburgh 1986. She represented Great Britain at the 1988 Olympic Games and the 1992 Olympic Games.

== Early life ==
McDermott was born in Girvan, Scotland, moved to Llandrindod Wells, Wales aged three and attended school there. While attending Llandrindod High School, Wade was encouraged by her PE teacher to join Brecon Athletic Club.

== Athletics career ==
After joining Brecon Athletic Club as an 11-year-old, Mcdermott trained in the Elan Valley and won the 1976 AAAs National under-15 800m title in 2:11.10 and the 1977 AAAs U17 title in 2:07.74. In 1979, she finished sixth at the European Junior Championships in Poland, running 2:04.72.

McDermott first came to senior prominence in 1981, when she finished third behind Anne Clarkson in the 800 metres event at the 1981 WAAA Championships. McDermott was selected for the Welsh team for the 1982 Commonwealth Games in Brisbane, Australia and won the 800 metres title in 2:01.31, just ahead of Scotland's Anne Clarkson, who ran 2:01.52. At the time mcDermott was studying at Loughborough University and was a member of Bristol AC.

In 1984, she failed to qualify for the Olympics, and then in 1985 improved her three-year-old 800 metre PB from 2:00.56 to 1:57:42, breaking Christina Boxer's six-year-old UK record of 1:59.05. This made her the third British woman, after Boxer and Shireen Bailey, to run sub 2:00 minutes for 800 metres. The record stood for ten years. She also broke the UK record for the mile with 4:19.41 in Oslo. This made her only the fourth woman in history to run a sub 4:20-mile, after Mary Decker, Maricica Puica and Natalya Artyomova. The record stood for only a month, as Zola Budd ran 4:17.57 in Zurich. American magazine Track & Field News ranked her in the top 10 on their world merit rankings, at both 800 metres (8) and 1500 m/mile (9).

In 1986, now competing under her married name Kirsty Wade and living in the north-east of England (she became a member of Blaydon Harriers Athletic Club), she became the first woman to achieve the 800m/1500m double at the Commonwealth Games, when she won in Edinburgh. She won the 800 metres in 2:00.94, ahead of England's Diane Edwards and Lorraine Baker. In the 1500m, she defeated the Canadian pair, Debbie Bowker and Lynn Williams in 4:10.91. Later that year at the European Championships in Stuttgart, she finished seventh in the 1500 metres final in 4:04.99. In the Track & Field News world merit rankings, she ranked number 5 in the 1500/mile top ten.

In June 1987, Wade scored one of her biggest career wins, when she won the European Cup 1500 metres in Prague, defeating future World and Olympic champion Tatyana Samolenko. In July, she ran her lifetime best for the 1500 m with 4:00.73 in Gateshead. In August, she ran her 3000 metres best of 8:47.70, to become only the second British woman, after Christina Boxer, to have run sub two-minutes for the 800 metres and sub nine-minutes for the 3000 metres (the feat has since been achieved by Hannah England, Jessica Judd and Laura Muir). In September, in the 1500m final at the World Championships in Rome (won by Samolenko), she was sixth in 4:01.41. She originally finished seventh but was promoted after the disqualification of Sandra Gasser. For the third consecutive year, she ranked in the top ten at 1500/mile, in the Track & Field News merit rankings, at number 6.

At the 1988 AAA Championships in Birmingham, incorporating the British Olympic trials, Wade became British 800 metres champion after winning the British title at the 1988 AAA Championships and was also third in the 1500 m, earning selection for both events. At the Olympic Games in Seoul, she reached the semi-finals of the 800 metres, running 2:00.86, while in the 1500 metres, she ran a disappointing 4:08.37 in the heats, failing to reach the final.

Wade's next major competition was the 1991 World Championships in Tokyo, having missed the 1990 season through pregnancy. In Tokyo, she finished sixth in the 1500 metres final in 4:05.16. She qualified for her second Olympic Games in 1992. In Barcelona, she ran 4:08.30, to reach the semi-finals of the 1500 metres, where she was eliminated in 4:11.36.

== Later career ==
Wade became an Olympic Torchbearer for the 2012 London Olympics, carrying the torch through Stornoway on the Isle of Lewis on the morning of 11 May 2012. Wade was nominated for her community sports development work on the Isle of Lewis, where she lives with her husband and their children.

== Personal bests ==
- 800 m – 1:57.42 (24 June 1985 Belfast, UK record 1985–1995)
- 1000 m – 2:33.70 (9 August 1985 Gateshead, UK record 1985–1995)
- 1500 m – 4:00.73 (26 July 1987 Gateshead)
- 1 mile – 4:19.41 (27 July 1985 Oslo, UK record July 1985 – August 1985)
- 3000 m – 8:47.7 (5 August 1987 Gateshead)

== International competitions ==
Year	Competition	Venue	Position	Event	Notes
Representing Great Britain / Wales
1979	European Junior Championships	Bydgoszcz, Poland	6th	800 metres	2:04.72
1982	Commonwealth Games	Brisbane, Australia	1st	800 metres	2:01.31
1985	European Indoor Championships	Piraeus, Greece	6th	800 metres	2:07.98
1985	European Cup	Moscow, Russia	4th	800 metres	1:57.48
1985	Grand Prix Final	Rome, Italy	3rd	800 metres	2:00.23
1986	European Indoor Championships	Madrid, Spain	4th	800 metres	2:03.69
1986	Commonwealth Games	Edinburgh, Scotland	1st	800 metres	2:00.94
1986	Commonwealth Games	Edinburgh, Scotland	1st	1500 metres	4:10.91
1986	European Championships	Stuttgart, West Germany	7th	1500 metres	4:04.99
1986	Grand Prix Final	Rome, Italy	3rd	1500 metres	4:03.74
1987	World Indoor Championships	Indianapolis, United States	5th	1500 metres	4:08.91
1987	European Cup	Prague, Czechoslovakia	1st	1500 metres	4:09.03
1987	World Championships	Rome, Italy	6th	1500 metres	4:01.41
1988	Olympic Games	Seoul, South Korea	12th (sf)	800 metres	2:00.86
1988	Olympic Games	Seoul, South Korea	15th (h)	1500 metres	4:08.37
1991	World Championships	Tokyo, Japan	6th	1500 metres	4:05.16
1992	Olympic Games	Barcelona, Spain	21st (sf)	1500 metres	4:11.36 (4:08.30 in heat)
(sf)/(h) Indicates overall position in semifinals or heats

=== National titles ===
- AAA Championships 800 metres (1988)
- AAA Indoor Championships 800 metres (1981, 1985, 1986, 1994)
- AAA Indoor Championships 1500 metres (1987)
