= Debbie Scott-Bowker =

Canadian middle-distance runner (born 1958)

Personal information
- Born: 16 December 1958 (age 67) Victoria, British Columbia, Canada

Sport
- Sport: Track and field
Medal record
Representing Canada
Commonwealth Games
Silver medal – second place	1986 Edinburgh	1500 m
Silver medal – second place	1986 Edinburgh	3000 m
Pan American Games
Silver medal – second place	1987 Indianapolis	3000 m
World Indoor Games
Gold medal – first place	1985 Paris	3000 m

Deborah Dawn "Debbie" Scott-Bowker (born 16 December 1958) is a Canadian former middle- and long-distance runner. A three-time Olympian for Canada (1984, 1988 and 1992), she reached the 1500 m final in 1984, and both the 1500 m and 3000 m finals in 1988. She was also a three-time World Championship finalist, reaching the 1500 m and 3000 m finals in 1987, and the 1500 m final in 1991.

Her greatest international performance came at the 1985 IAAF World Indoor Games (the precursor of the IAAF World Indoor Championships), where she took the gold medal in the 3000 metres. Scott-Bowker competed at four Commonwealth Games (1978–90), winning silver medals at the 1986 Commonwealth Games in the 1500 m and 3000 m, and another silver in the 1500 m at the 1987 Pan American Games. She also competed for Canada at the IAAF World Cross Country Championships on five occasions – her best placing at that event was eighth in 1981.

== Career ==
=== Early career and college ===
Born in Victoria, British Columbia, she attended Claremont Secondary School and was interested in sports, taking part in field hockey and volleyball while there. During her training for these sports, her talent for running was recognised by her teacher and he encouraged her to become part of the school's cross country running team. She went on to attend the University of Victoria and competed athletically for the Victoria Vikes collegiate team in 1976 and from 1978 to 1981. She won her first title at the British Columbia Cross Country Championships in 1977 and the 5 ft 4 in (1.63 m) Scott went on to win at that competition twice more during her period at college. She established herself among her nation's best distance runners in 1978 by setting a Canadian record over the 5000 metres, running a time of 16:29.6 minutes.

Her first major international event was the 1978 Commonwealth Games and she ran in the 1500 metres (being eliminated in the heats) and the 3000 metres (coming ninth in the final). Her next major outing came at the 1979 IAAF World Cross Country Championships, where she led the Canadian women's team with a 13th-place finish. She was selected for the 1980 Moscow Olympics, but a Canadian boycott of the event meant she did not compete. The 1981 World Cross Country was held over a shorter distance and she gave a better performance, placing eighth and leading her national team to fifth in the rankings. She won her first national title at the Canadian Track and Field Championships that year, winning the 1500 m race, and would go on to take five straight titles up to 1985. She also began competing on the international circuit and ran a best of 4:33.02 minutes for the mile run at the DN Galan in Sweden, taking third place.

=== National records and Olympic debut ===
In 1982 she won the Fifth Avenue Mile in a course record of 4:23.96 minutes, becoming the first non-American winner. She broke two Canadian records on the track that summer. First came the 5000 m record with a time of 15:48.99 minutes at the Prefontaine Classic – a near ten second improvement on Geri Fitch's time set the previous year. Then, in August in Koblenz, she broke Thelma Wright's 3000 m national record from 1975 with a run of 8:48.85 minutes. Scott-Bowker's first and only win over 3000 m at the national championships also came that year. Her major competition of the year was the 1982 Commonwealth Games and she had similar results as she had four years previously, losing in the 1500 m heats and reaching the 3000 m final.

After a quiet 1983, she re-emerged at the 1984 IAAF World Cross Country Championships, but her 64th-place finish was below her usual standard, while Lynn Williams led the Canadian team. Her Olympic debut followed at the 1984 Los Angeles Olympics, where she entered the 1500 m. After running a personal best of 4:09.16 minutes in the heats she placed tenth in the final.

=== International medals ===
Scott-Bowker had her first major success at the 1985 IAAF World Indoor Games. The newly inaugurated indoor track and field championship saw her defeat reigning European indoor champion Agnese Possamai to become the first 3000 m women's champion. Her winning time of 9:04.99 minutes was also a Canadian indoor record, easily bettering the previous mark of Nancy Tinari. She improved her personal best for the outdoor event at the DN Galan, running 8:49.80 minutes. On grass, Scott-Bowker had a good showing at the 1985 IAAF World Cross Country Championships – in eleventh place she led the Canadians to fifth place in the team race. Expanding her oeuvre, she ran in the 10 km distance at the Vancouver Sun Run in a time of 33:31 minutes. That year she married her college coach, Ron Bowker, and began competing under that name from 1986 onwards.

International medals continued over the following two seasons. At the 1986 Commonwealth Games she was double silver medallist in the 1500 m and 3000 m (narrowly finishing behind compatriot Lynn Williams in the latter event). The 1987 Pan American Games brought another 1500 m silver medal, as she finished behind American Linda Sheskey. She made her fifth and final world cross appearance at the 1986 IAAF World Cross Country Championships, but was some way down the field in 64th place as Canada dropped out of the top ten teams. Her first world track appearance came at the 1987 World Championships in Athletics in Rome and she was a finalist in both the 1500 m and 3000 m events, placing eleventh and thirteenth respectively.

=== Later international career ===
She was chosen for the Canadian Olympic team for the 1988 Summer Olympics and ran two personal bests in the heats. She ran a career best of 8:43.81 minutes to reach the 3000 m final, where she was nearly half a minute slower in 15th place. A new best of 4:07.08 followed in the 1500 m heats, but again she was somewhat slower in the final, this time taking twelfth. With no major events in 1989, her next major tournament was the 1990 Commonwealth Games. Although she failed to medal on her fourth appearance at the games, she still managed to place sixth in the 1500 m final. That year she won the Vancouver Sun Run for the second time in her career.

At the age of 32, she ran a 1500 m personal best at the 1991 World Championships in Athletics in Tokyo and matched her overall placing from her last outing at the event, ending in eleventh. The last global outing of her career was a third Olympic selection – at the 1992 Summer Olympics she was a 1500 m semi-finalist.

== Personal bests ==
- 800 metres: 2:01.48 min (1986)
- 1000 metres: 2:38.30 min (1986)
- 1500 metres: 4:05.07 min (1991)
- Mile run (track): 4:29.67 min (1982)
- Mile run (road): 4:23.96 min (1982)
- 2000 metres: 5:39.96 min (1986)
- 3000 metres: 8:43.81 min (1988)
  - 3000 m indoor: 9:04.99 min (1985)
- 5000 metres: 15:48.99 min (1982)

== Achievements ==
- 7-time Canadian 1500m champion (1981, 1982, 1983, 1984, 1985, 1987, 1991)
- 1982 Canadian 3000m champion

Year	Competition	Venue	Position	Event	Notes
Representing Canada
1978	Commonwealth Games	Edmonton, Alberta, Canada	17th (h)	1500 m	4:24.36
1978	Commonwealth Games	Edmonton, Alberta, Canada	9th	3000 m	10:02.59
1979	World Cross Country Championships	Limerick, Ireland	13th	5.0 km	
1981	World Cross Country Championships	Madrid, Spain	8th	4.4 km	
1982	Commonwealth Games	Brisbane, Australia	11th (h)	1500 m	4:18.90
1982	Commonwealth Games	Brisbane, Australia	12th	3000 m	9:32.20
1984	World Cross Country Championships	New York City, United States	64th	5.0 km	
1984	Olympic Games	Los Angeles, United States	10th	1500 m	4:10.41
1985	World Indoor Games	Paris, France	1st	3000 m	9:04.99
1985	World Cross Country Championships	Lisbon, Portugal	11th	5.0 km	
1986	World Cross Country Championships	Neuchâtel, Switzerland	64th	4.7 km	
1986	Commonwealth Games	Edinburgh, Scotland	2nd	1500 m	4:11.94
1986	Commonwealth Games	Edinburgh, Scotland	2nd	3000 m	8:54.83
1987	Pan American Games	Indianapolis, United States	2nd	1500 m	
1987	World Championships	Rome, Italy	11th	1500 m	4:08.38
1987	World Championships	Rome, Italy	13th	3000 m	8:58.63
1988	Olympic Games	Seoul, South Korea	12th	1500 m	4:17.95
1988	Olympic Games	Seoul, South Korea	15th	3000 m	9:11.95
1990	Commonwealth Games	Auckland, New Zealand	6th	1500 m	4:11.20
1991	World Championships	Tokyo, Japan	11th	1500 m	4:06.06
1992	Olympic Games	Barcelona, Spain	22nd (sf)	1500 m	4:12.50
(#) Indicates overall position in qualifying heats (h) or semifinals (sf)
