= Christiane Wartenberg =

German athlete (born 1956)

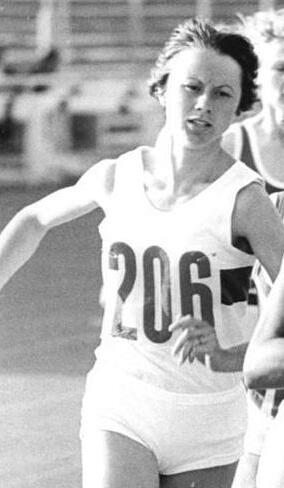
- Wartenberg in 1979

Personal information
- Born: 27 October 1956 (age 69) Prenzlau, East Germany

Sport
- Sport: Track and field
Medal record
Representing East Germany
Olympic Games
Silver medal – second place	1980 Moscow	1500 metres

Christiane Wartenberg (née Stoll; born 27 October 1956) is a German athlete who competed mainly in the 1,500 metres.

She competed for East Germany in the 1980 Summer Olympics held in Moscow, Russia in the 1,500 metres where she won the silver medal.

She also won East German Championships in the 1,500 m in 1979, 1980 and 1983, in addition to winning indoors in 1975, 1980, 1983 and 1984. She married long jumper Frank Wartenberg in 1977.
