= Lynn Kanuka-Williams =

Canadian middle-distance runner (born 1960)

Personal information
- Born: July 11, 1960 (age 66) Regina, Saskatchewan, Canada

Sport
- Sport: Track and field
Medal record
Representing Canada
Olympic Games
| Bronze medal – third place | 1984 Los Angeles | 3000 metres |
Commonwealth Games
| Gold medal – first place | 1986 Edinburgh | 3000 metres |
| Bronze medal – third place | 1986 Edinburgh | 1500 metres |
Summer Universiade
| Bronze medal – third place | 1983 Edmonton | 3000 metres |

Lynn Kanuka-Williams, née Kanuka, (born July 11, 1960) is a Canadian athlete from Regina, Saskatchewan. She competed in 3000m races, as well as a smaller number of 1500m races.

She competed for Canada at the 1984 Summer Olympics held in Los Angeles, U.S. in the 3,000 metres where she won the bronze medal (in the race notable for the incident between Mary Decker and Zola Budd). Four years later in Seoul, South Korea she finished fifth in the 1500 metres. Additionally, she collected a bronze medal at the 1989 World Cross Country championships.

Kanuka-Williams competed in the AIAW for the San Diego State Aztecs track and field team, finishing 5th in the 3000 m at the 1980 AIAW Outdoor Track and Field Championships.

== Achievements ==
| Year | Competition | Venue | Position | Event | Notes |
Representing Canada
| 1983 | Universiade | Edmonton, Canada | 5th | 1500 m | 4:12.40 |
| 1983 | Universiade | Edmonton, Canada | 3rd | 3000 m | 9:07.74 |
| 1983 | World Championships | Helsinki, Finland | 10th | 3000 m | 8:50.20 |
| 1984 | Olympic Games | Los Angeles, United States | 3rd | 3000 m | 8:42.14 |
| 1986 | Commonwealth Games | Edinburgh, United Kingdom | 3rd | 1500 m | 4:12.66 |
| 1986 | Commonwealth Games | Edinburgh, United Kingdom | 1st | 3000 m | 8:54.29 |
| 1987 | World Indoor Championships | Indianapolis, United States | 6th | 3000 m | 8:50.80 |
| 1987 | World Championships | Rome, Italy | 9th | 3000 m | 8:49.91 |
| 1988 | Olympic Games | Seoul, South Korea | 5th | 1500 m | 4:00.86 |
| 1988 | Olympic Games | Seoul, South Korea | 8th | 3000 m | 8:38.43 |
| 1989 | World Cross Country Championships | Stavanger, Norway | 3rd | | |

== See also ==
- Canadian records in track and field
