= Doina Melinte =

Romanian middle-distance runner (born 1956)

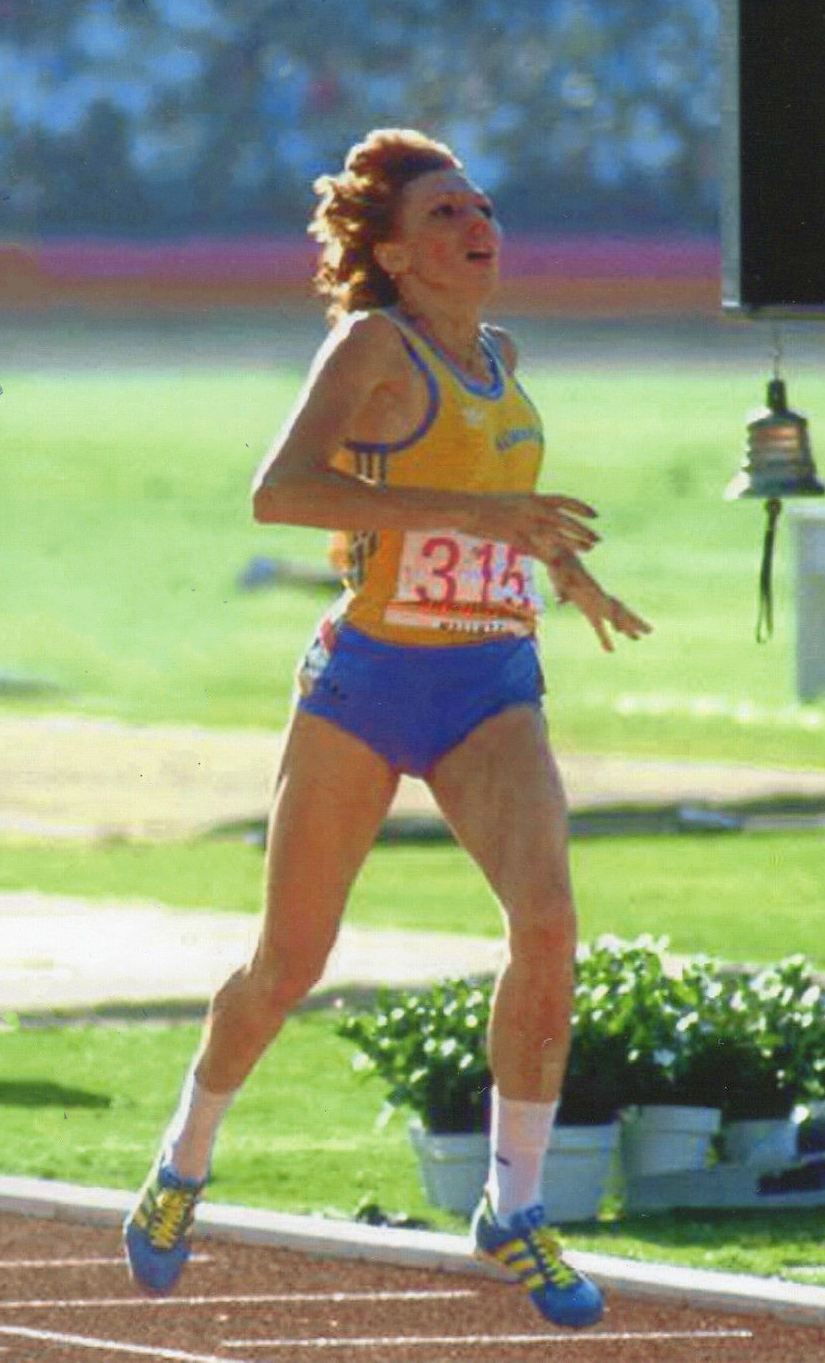
- Melinte winning the 800 m final at the 1984 Olympics

Personal information
- Born: 27 December 1956 (age 69) Hudești, Romania
- Height: 171 cm (5 ft 7 in)
- Weight: 59 kg (130 lb)

Sport
- Sport: Athletics
- Events: 800 m, 1500 m
- Coached by: Ioan Zanca; Dorin Melinte (husband)

Achievements and titles
- Personal bests: 800 m – 1:55.05 (1982); 1500 m – 3:56.7 (1986)
Medal record
Women's athletics
Representing Romania
Olympic Games
Gold medal – first place	1984 Los Angeles	800 m
Silver medal – second place	1984 Los Angeles	1500 m
World Championships
Bronze medal – third place	1987 Rome	1500 m
World Indoor Championships
Gold medal – first place	1987 Indianapolis	1500 m
Gold medal – first place	1989 Budapest	1500 m
European Championships
Bronze medal – third place	1986 Stuttgart	1500 m
European Indoor Championships
Gold medal – first place	1985 Piraeus	1500 m
Gold medal – first place	1988 Budapest	1500 m
Gold medal – first place	1990 Glasgow	1500 m
Silver medal – second place	1984 Gothenburg	800 m
Bronze medal – third place	1992 Genoa	1500 m
Universiade
Gold medal – first place	1981 Bucharest	800 m

Doina Ofelia Melinte (Romanian pronunciation: [ˈdojna meˈlinte]; née Beșliu on 27 December 1956) is a retired Romanian middle-distance runner. She competed at four Olympics (1980–92), and won a gold medal in the 800 metres and a silver medal in the 1,500 metres in 1984. She won the world indoor title in 1987 and 1989 and the European indoor title in 1985, 1988 and 1990 in the 1,500 m. Her world indoor mile record of 4:17.41 in 1990, stood for 26 years.

== Career ==
Melinte competed as Doina Beșliu at the 1980 Moscow Olympics and reached the semi-finals of the 800 metres. In 1982, now competing as Doina Melinte, she was the fastest woman in the world at 800 metres but only finished sixth in the final of that year's European Championships in Athens. She also finished sixth in both the 800 m and 1,500 m at the 1983 World Championships in Helsinki.

At the 1984 Los Angeles Olympics, she won a gold medal in the 800 metres ahead of Kim Gallagher of the US and countrywoman Fiţa Lovin, and a silver medal in the 1,500 metres behind Gabriella Dorio of Italy and ahead of fellow Romanian, Maricica Puică. She won a 1,500 m bronze medal at the 1986 European Championships, behind the Soviet pair of Ravilya Agletdinova and Tatyana Samolenko. In March 1987, she won the 1,500 m at the World Indoor Championships in Indianapolis, ahead of Samolenko. In September of that year, she won a bronze medal at the World Championships in Rome. She originally finished fourth but was promoted one position after the disqualification of the original bronze medal winner Sandra Gasser.

At her third Olympic Games in Seoul 1988, she finished a disappointing ninth in the 1500 m final won by her team-mate Paula Ivan. In 1989, she defended her 1500 m World Indoor title in Budapest, winning in a championship record of 4:04.79. In February 1990, she broke the world indoor mile record with 4:17.14 in East Rutherford. The record stood for 26 years until Genzebe Dibaba ran 4:13.31 in 2016. A month later, she won her third European Indoor title over 1500 m in Glasgow. A medal favourite for the 1990 European Championships in Split, she could only finish sixth in the 1500 m final. In 1991, she was fourth in the 1500 m finals at both the World Indoor Championships in Seville and the World Championships in Tokyo.

Melinte concluded her international career at the 1992 Barcelona Olympics, where she dropped out of the 1500 m final.

== Personal life ==
Melinte first wanted to be a gymnast or a ballerina, but did not have adequate conditions for training. She then played handball before changing to athletics. Around 1980–82 she married her coach Dorin Melinte, and after retiring from competitions in 1992 became a coach herself. In 2010–2012 she served as director of the National Agency for Youth and Sports (Autoritatea Naţională pentru Sport şi Tineret) and later became vice president of the national anti-doping agency.

== International competitions ==
Year	Competition	Venue	Position	Event	Notes
Representing Romania
1980	Olympic Games	Moscow, Soviet Union	13th (sf)	800 m	2:00.8
1981	Universiade	Bucharest, Romania	1st	800 m	1:57.81
1982	European Championships	Athens, Greece	6th	800 m	1:59.65
1983	World Championships	Helsinki, Finland	6th	800 m	2:00.13
1983	World Championships	Helsinki, Finland	6th	1500 m	4:04.42
1984	European Indoor Championships	Gothenburg, Sweden	2nd	800 m	1:59.81
1984	Olympic Games	Los Angeles, United States	1st	800 m	1:57.60
1984	Olympic Games	Los Angeles, United States	2nd	1500 m	4:03.76
1985	European Indoor Championships	Piraeus, Greece	1st	1500 m	4:02.54
1986	European Championships	Stuttgart, Germany	3rd	1500 m	4:02.44
1986	European Championships	Stuttgart, Germany	DNF (heats)	3000 m	—
1987	World Indoor Championships	Indianapolis, United States	1st	1500 m	4:05.68
1987	World Championships	Rome, Italy	3rd	1500 m	3:59.27
1988	European Indoor Championships	Budapest, Hungary	1st	1500 m	4:05.77
1988	Olympic Games	Seoul, South Korea	9th	1500 m	4:02.89
1989	World Indoor Championships	Budapest, Hungary	1st	1500 m	4:04.79
1989	World Cup	Barcelona, Spain	3rd	800 m	1:56.65
1990	European Indoor Championships	Glasgow, United Kingdom	1st	1500 m	4:09.73
1990	European Championships	Split, Yugoslavia	6th	1500 m	4:10.91
1991	World Indoor Championships	Seville, Spain	4th	1500 m	4:06.65
1991	World Championshipas	Tokyo, Japan	4th	1500 m	4:03.19
1992	European Indoor Championships	Genoa, Italy	3rd	1500 m	4:06.90
1992	Olympic Games	Barcelona, Spain	DNF (final)	1500 m	4:04.42 (semifinals)
(sf) indicates overall position in semifinal round (dnf) = did not finish
