= Sandra Gasser =

Swiss middle-distance runner

Medal record

Women's athletics

Representing Switzerland

World Indoor Championships
Bronze medal – third place	1993 Toronto	1500 m

European Championships
Bronze medal – third place	1990 Split	1500 m

Sandra Gasser (born 27 July 1962 in Bern) is a retired Swiss track and field athlete who specialised in middle distance running.

After the 1987 World Championships, where placed third in the 1500 metres, she failed a doping test and was disqualified. Following her two-year ban, she rejoined the world elite and won bronze medals at both the 1990 European Championships and 1993 World Indoor Championships, although in the final of the latter, she fell before the finish line.

Sandra Gasser won seven Swiss championship titles, and still holds the Swiss national record in 800 metres. She is 1.71 m tall (5'7") and her competition weight was 52 kg (114 lb).

== International competitions ==
Year	Competition	Venue	Position	Event	Notes
Representing Switzerland
1984	European Indoor Championships	Gothenburg, Sweden	3rd	1500 m	4:11.70
1986	European Championships	Stuttgart, West Germany	heats	3000 m	9:04.78
1987	European Indoor Championships	Lievin, France	1st	1500 m	4:06.76
1987	World Indoor Championships	Indianapolis, United States	6th	1500 m	4:09.89
1987	World Championships	Rome, Italy	DQ (3rd)	1500 m	~~3:59.06~~
1990	European Indoor Championships	Glasgow, United Kingdom	2nd	1500 m	4:10.13
1990	European Championships	Split, Yugoslavia	3rd	1500 m	4:08.89
1993	World Indoor Championships	Toronto, Canada	3rd	1500 m	4:10.99
1993	World Championships	Stuttgart, Germany	heats	1500 m	4:11.75

=== Personal bests ===
- 800 m: 1:58.90 min, 21 June 1987 in Berlin, Swiss record (ran 1:58.65 in 1990, unofficial because it was in a men's race)
- 1500 m: 4:01.10 min, 4 July 1987 in Oslo
- 3000 m: 8:54.13 min, 12 July 1990 in Lausanne

== See also ==
- List of sportspeople sanctioned for doping offences
