= Maria Radu =

Romanian long-distance runner (born 1959)

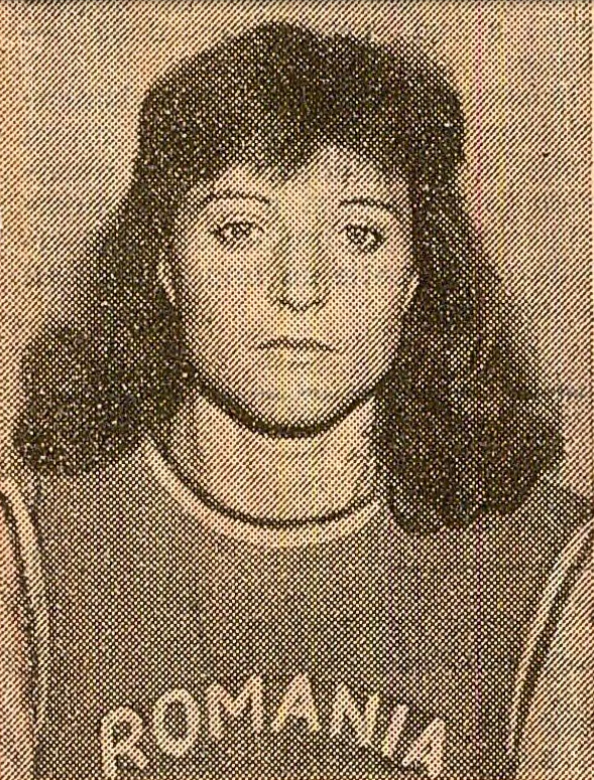

Personal information
- Born: 5 November 1959 (age 66) Craiova, Romania

Sport
- Sport: Track and field
Medal record
Representing Romania
European Indoor Championships
| Silver medal – second place | 1983 Budapest | 1500m |
Summer Universiade
| Gold medal – first place | 1983 Edmonton | 3000m |
| Bronze medal – third place | 1981 Bucharest | 3000m |
| Bronze medal – third place | 1983 Edmonton | 1500m |

Maria Radu (born 5 November 1959) is a retired female middle and long-distance runner from Romania, who is best known for winning the women's 3000 metres at the 1983 Summer Universiade.

== Achievements ==
| Year | Competition | Venue | Position | Event | Notes |
Representing Romania
| 1983 | European Indoor Championships | Budapest, Hungary | 2nd | 1,500 metres | |
| 1983 | World Championships | Helsinki, Finland | 12th | 1,500 metres | |
| 1983 | World Student Games | Edmonton, Canada | 1st | 3,000 metres | |

== Personal bests ==
- 1500 metres - 4:10.15 min (1983)
- 3000 metres - 9:30.37 min (1983)
