= Paula Ivan =

Romanian middle-distance runner

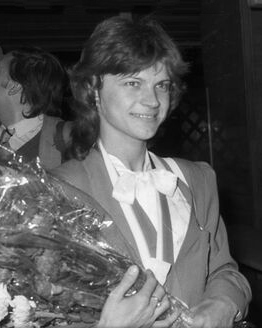
- Ivan in 1988

Personal information
- Born: 20 July 1963 (age 62) Herăști, Romania
- Height: 170 cm (5 ft 7 in)
- Weight: 57 kg (126 lb)

Sport
- Sport: Athletics
- Event: 800–5000 m
- Club: CS Olimpia București
- Coached by: Ion Puica

Achievements and titles
- Personal bests: 800 m – 1:56.42 (1988); 1500 m – 3:53.96 (1988); 3000 m – 8:27.15 (1988); 5000 m – 15:31.22 (1989)
Medal record
Representing Romania
Olympic Games
| Gold medal – first place | 1988 Seoul | 1500 m |
| Silver medal – second place | 1988 Seoul | 3000 m |
Universiade
| Gold medal – first place | 1987 Zagreb | 1500 m |
| Gold medal – first place | 1987 Zagreb | 3000 m |
| Gold medal – first place | 1989 Duisburg | 1500 m |
| Gold medal – first place | 1989 Duisburg | 3000 m |
World Cup in Athletics
| Gold medal – first place | 1989 Barcelona | 1500 m |
European Indoor Championships
| Gold medal – first place | 1989 The Hague | 1500 m |

Paula Ivan, née Paula Ionescu, (20 July 1963), later known as Paula Ilie, is a retired Romanian middle-distance runner.

Born in Herăști, Giurgiu County, she graduated from the Gheorghe Șincai High School in Bucharest in 1982. In 1987, Ivan won gold medals in the 1500 m and 3000 m at the 1987 Summer Universiade. Later the same year at the World Championships she did not advance past the heats of the same events. In July 1988 she won the 800 m and 1500 m events at the Balkan Games, setting her all-times personal best over 800 m. On 27 July at Verona Ivan broke the 4-minute barrier over 1500 m, clocking 3:58.80. She improved to 3:56.22 in Zurich on 17 August. At the 1988 Summer Olympics she won a silver medal in her first event, 3000 m, followed by a gold in the 1500 m. Her winning time, 3:53.96 was the Olympic record until 2021.

She was named the BTA Best Balkan Athlete of the Year in 1988. In 1989 Ivan won the 1500 m at the European Indoor Championships in Den Haag, in a time of 4:07.16. Later that year, outdoors, she broke the world record for the mile with a time of 4:15.61. She repeated her 1500/3000 m golden double at the Universiade in Duisburg in August and then won the 1500 m at the IAAF World Cup in Barcelona in September. She then retired from competitions to become a coach.

Ivan competed in the IAAF World Cross Country Championships four times (1984–1987). At the 1985 championships, she was part of the Romanian team that won the bronze medal (Ivan finished 34th). Her best individual performance was a 9th-place finish at the 1987 race in Warsaw.

In 2000, at 36 years old and after ten seasons away from competition, Ivan returned for one more season. She ran the 1500 m in several meets on the IAAF Grand Prix circuit, with her season's best time being 4:04.66, at the Monte Carlo Herculis-Zepter meet, on 18 August 2000. Since 2002, she works at the Faculty of Physical Education and Sport at Spiru Haret University in Bucharest.

Records
| Preceded by Mary Decker-Slaney | Women's mile world record holder 10 July 1989 – 14 August 1996 | Succeeded by Svetlana Masterkova |
Sporting positions
| Preceded by (Soviet Union) Tatyana Samolenko | Women's 3.000m Best Year Performance; 1989 | Succeeded by (Canada) Angela Chalmers |
