= Elly van Hulst =

Dutch middle-distance runner

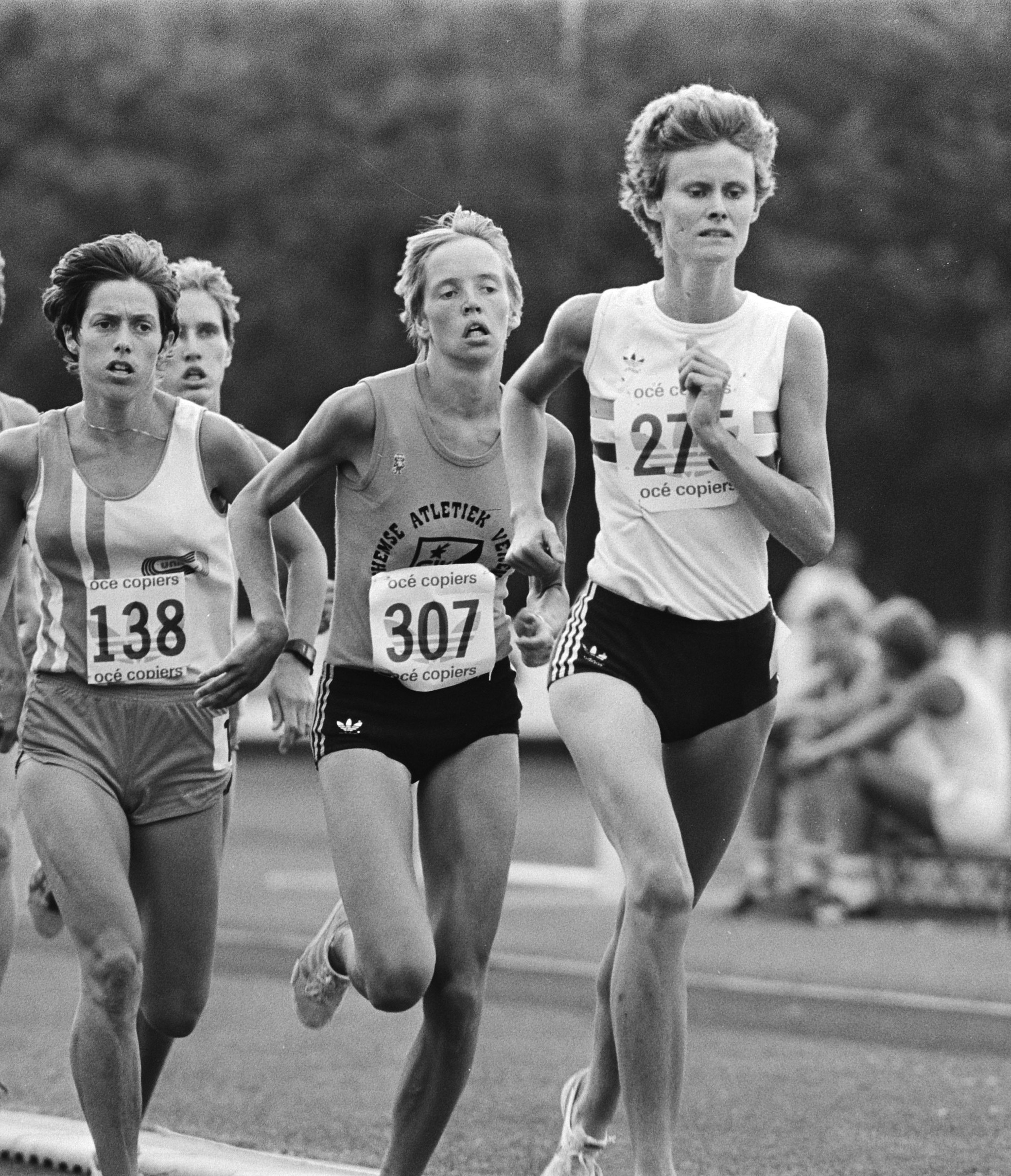
- Elly van Hulst (right) winning a national title in the 1500 m in 1983

Personal information
- Born: 9 June 1959 (age 67) Culemborg, the Netherlands
- Height: 1.77 m (5 ft 10 in)
- Weight: 56 kg (123 lb)

Sport
- Sport: Running
- Club: Olympia '48, Den Haag
Medal record
Representing the Netherlands
World Indoor Championships
Gold medal – first place	1985 Paris	1500 m
Gold medal – first place	1989 Budapest	3000 m
European Indoor Championships
Silver medal – second place	1984 Gothenburg	1500 m
Silver medal – second place	1987 Lieven	3000 m
Gold medal – first place	1988 Budapest	3000 m
Gold medal – first place	1989 The Hague	3000 m
Gold medal – first place	1990 Glasgow	3000 m

Elisa ("Elly") Maria van Hulst (born 9 June 1959) is a former middle distance runner from the Netherlands. She competed in the 800 m and 1500 m events at the 1984 Summer Olympics and in the 1500 m and 3000 m at the 1988 Summer Olympics; her best achievement was ninth place in the 3000 m in 1988. During her career she set one world record, on 4 March 1989 at the 1989 European Indoor Championships in Athletics in the 3000 m event (8:33.82), as well as three national records: in the mile (1986, 4:22.40), 1500 m (1987, 4:03.63) and 3000 m (1988, 8:33.97). In 1989 she was named Dutch Sportswoman of the Year.

She started training in ballet, but had a limited success because of her height. At age 11 she started training in athletics, together with her elder brother. When she was in high school, she moved from Maastricht to Leeuwarden. There she started a long-term training program with her coach Theo Kersten. Although her trainer was 13 years older, they got involved into a romantic relationship and later got married.

Elly van Hulst's career would last for almost twenty years and bring her 65 national, three European and two world titles. On the 3000 m indoor, she held the world record for twelve years. She participated in the 1984 Summer Olympics in Los Angeles and the 1988 Summer Olympics in Seoul. At the end of the 1980s Van Hulst showed that she was among the best athletes in the world. In 1988 she defeated Mary Decker, favorite for the 3000 m victory in Zurich.

In 1990, Van Hulst began having strange physical complaints and was tired frequently. Doctors were unable to find anything that caused her symptoms, and so she kept on running. Eventually Van Hulst could not participate in the 1992 Summer Olympics in Barcelona, because she was in the hospital for medical tests. It was discovered that she had a serious viral infection, and had had it for two years.

As a result of the viral infection, she got exercise-induced asthma. However, because her asthma was easily controlled, her career was apparently unaffected. Just before the European Championships in 1994 in Paris, she heard that one of the ingredients of her medication was on the list of banned substances. A permitted alternative was not effective. As a result, she ended up in ninth place in Paris. Two years later, the ingredient in question was found to be harmless and was removed from the list of banned substances, but this change came too late for Van Hulst: she was not able to participate in the 1996 Summer Olympics in Atlanta.

During her successful years, Van Hulst trained in the Algarve in Portugal. She loved this place and later, when her career had ended, moved there. Nowadays she runs a real estate business, Elly van Hulst Real Estate Lda, together with her husband.

Awards
Preceded by None	Rotterdam Sportswoman of the Year; 1986 – 1989	Succeeded by Petra Kamstra
Preceded by Nelli Cooman	KNAU Cup; 1987 – 1989	Succeeded by Ellen van Langen
Preceded by Yvonne van Gennip	Dutch Sportswoman of the Year; 1989	Succeeded by Leontien van Moorsel
