= 1992 IAAF World Road Relay Championships =

- Dates: 9–10 May 1992
- Host city: Funchal, Portugal
- Level: Senior
- Type: Marathon relay
- Events: 2
- Participation: 138 athletes from 16 nations

The 1992 IAAF World Road Relay Championships was the first edition of the global, international marathon relay competition, organised by the International Association of Athletics Federations (IAAF). It marked the formal establishment of an ekiden as a world championship event, following on from the non-championship 1986 IAAF World Challenge Road Relay. The event took place on 9–10 May in Funchal, Portugal with the participation of 138 athletes (90 men and 48 women) from 16 nations. The women's race took place on Saturday 9 May and the men's race took place on Sunday 10 April.

Each national team consisted of six athletes, who alternately covered six stages to complete the 42.195 km marathon distance. The first, third and fifth stages were of 5 km, the second and fourth stages were of 10 km, and the final stage covered the remaining 7.195 km.

In the women's race, Lisa York put the British ahead by twelve seconds in the first leg, but Marian Sutton was unable to finish the second leg, forcing Britain out of the rankings. Denmark's Dorthe Rasmussen made up a minute over the field in the second leg, bringing her nation into contention alongside Portugal. Stage wins by Felicidade Sena and Conceição Ferreira created a significant lead for Portugal and Fernanda Ribeiro won the last stage to bring her country home in 2:20:14 hours. Denmark were next to finish, almost four and a half minutes later, following by Spain with 2:25:06. The Romanian team were fast finishers in fourth shortly after, having been unable to make up for a disastrous two-minute deficit from the first leg.

In the men's race, the Kenyan team enjoyed a clear victory, starting with the two fastest initial legs through Eliud Barngetuny and William Koech. Britain's John Mayock gained nine seconds on the Kenyans in the third leg, but subsequent stage wins by William Sigei, Richard Tum and William Mutwol secured victory for Kenya with over a minute and a half to spare. Portugal pulled well clear of the British in the second leg of Dionísio Castro and eventually took second place with a minute's advantage over Britain.

== Medal summary ==
| Event | Gold | | Silver | | Bronze | |
|---|---|---|---|---|---|---|
| Men's race | Kenya; Eliud Barngetuny; William Koech; Ezequiel Bitok; William Sigei; Richard Tum; William Mutwol | 2:00:02 | Portugal; Carlos Patrício; Dionísio Castro; Alberto Maravilha; Juvenal Ribeiro; Carlos Monteiro; Domingos Castro | 2:01:34 | United Kingdom; Carl Udall; Dave Clarke; John Mayock; Colin Walker; John Sherban; David Lewis | 2:02:34 |
| Women's race | Portugal; Fernanda Marques; Aurora Cunha; Felicidade Sena; Conceição Ferreira; Fatima Neves; Fernanda Ribeiro | 2:20:14 | Denmark; Berit Worm; Dorthe Rasmussen; Anita Palshøj; Aino Slej; Nina Christiansen; Bettina Andersen | 2:24:42 | Spain; Begoña Herraez; Cristina Nogue; Carmen Brunet; Rocío Ríos; Ana Isabel Alonso; Rosa Perez | 2:25:06 |

== Stage winners ==
| Stage | Distance | Men | Time | Women | Time |
|---|---|---|---|---|---|
| 1 | 5 km | Eliud Barngetuny (KEN) | 13:54 | Lisa York (GBR) | 16:03 |
| 2 | 10 km | William Koech (KEN) | 28:13 | Dorthe Rasmussen (DEN) | 33:08 |
| 3 | 5 km | John Mayock (GBR) | 13:59 | Felicidade Sena (POR) | 16:28 |
| 4 | 10 km | William Sigei (KEN) | 29:21 | Conceição Ferreira (POR) | 33:00 |
| 5 | 5 km | Richard Tum (KEN) | 14:16 | Laura Adam (GBR) | 16:31 |
| 6 | 7.195 km | William Mutwol (KEN) | 20:10 | Fernanda Ribeiro (POR) | 23:22 |

== Results ==
=== Men's race ===
| Rank | Team | Time |
|---|---|---|
| 1 | Kenya; Eliud Barngetuny (13:54); William Koech (28:13); Ezequiel Bitok (14:08); William Sigei (29:21); Richard Tum (14:16); William Mutwol (20:10) | 2:00:02 |
| 2 | Portugal; Carlos Patrício (13:58); Dionísio Castro (28:51); Alberto Maravilha (14:09); Juvenal Ribeiro (29:47); Carlos Monteiro (14:21); Domingos Castro (20:28) | 2:01:34 |
| 3 | United Kingdom; Carl Udall (14:11); Dave Clarke (29:30); John Mayock (13:59); Colin Walker (29:30); John Sherban (14:25); David Lewis (20:59) | 2:02:34 |
| 4 | Ethiopia; Debebe Demisse (13:57); Tekeye Gebrselassie (29:45); Jillo Dube (14:08); Habte Negash (29:57); Feyisa Melese (14:40); Badilu Kibret (20:42) | 2:03:09 |
| 5 | Spain; José Manuel Albentosa (14:18); Jesús González (29:18); Francisco Guerra (14:25); Juan Antonio Crespo (29:59); José Manuel García (14:27); Juan Carlos Paul (20:50) | 2:03:17 |
| 6 | United States; Jon Sinclair (14:09); Paul Aufdemberge (29:53); Brad Barquist (14:34); Steve Kartalia (29:41); Jeff Smith (14:31); William Mangan (21:11) | 2:03:59 |
| 7 | Czechoslovakia; Michal Kucera (14:09); Róbert Štefko (29:33); Luboš Šubrt (14:24); Jan Pesava (30:16); Stanislav Syriste (14:36); Marian Hunčík (21:33) | 2:04:31 |
| 8 | Japan; Yuichiro Fukushima (14:19); Naoki Yamagashira (29:26); Shinya Tadakuma (14:26); Satoru Shimizu (30:34); Tsuyoshi Fukai (14:45); Takayuki Ishimoto (21:11) | 2:04:41 |

=== Women's race ===
| Rank | Team | Time |
|---|---|---|
| 1 | Portugal; Fernanda Marques (16:15); Aurora Cunha (34:09); Felicidade Sena (16:28); Conceição Ferreira (33:00); Fatima Neves (17:00); Fernanda Ribeiro (23:22) | 2:20:14 |
| 2 | Denmark; Berit Worm (17:19); Dorthe Rasmussen (33:08); Anita Palshøj (17:20); Aino Slej (35:39); Nina Christiansen (16:52); Bettina Andersen (24:24) | 2:24:42 |
| 3 | Spain; Begoña Herraez (16:35); Cristina Nogue (34:56); Carmen Brunet (16:54); Rocío Ríos (35:19); Ana Isabel Alonso (16:38); Rosa Perez (24:44) | 2:25:06 |
| 4 | Romania; Margareta Florea (19:26); Anuța Cătună (34:03); Iulia Ionescu (16:51); Georgeta State (34:35); Elena Fidatov (16:49); Iulia Negură (23:42) | 2:25:26 |
| 5 | United States; Lisa Stone (16:48); Joy Smith (34:35); Lori Hewig (17:07); Charlotte Thomas (35:51); Melissa Johnson (17:00); Carmen Ayala-Troncoso (24:20) | 2:25:41 |
| 6 | Unified Team; Yelena Kopytova (16:57); Yelena Arkhipova (35:50); Svetlana Vasilieva (17:21); Natalya Galushko (35:04); Anastasiya Dantchinova (17:22); Larisa Yemelyanenko (24:42) | 2:27:16 |
| 7 | Brazil; Ana Claudia de Souza (16:49); Silvana Pereira (35:51); Solange Cordeiro de Souza (17:36); Rizoneide Vanderlei (35:31); Cleusa Maria Irineu (17:31); Rita de Cassia Santos de Jesús (24:35) | 2:27:53 |
| 8 | United Kingdom; Lisa York (16:03); Marian Sutton (DNF); Karen Hutcheson (16:42); Annette Bell (35:13); Laura Adam (16:31); Heather Heasman (24:06) | DNF |
