= IAAF World Road Relay Championships =

International long-distance relay competition

The IAAF World Road Relay Championships was a biennial international athletics competition in long-distance relay running. First organised by the International Association of Athletics Federations (IAAF) in 1992, the championship ran for four editions, with its last one occurring in 1998.

The relay format was based on the ekiden races native to Japan, where six runners team up for legs of varying length to cover the classic 42.195 km marathon distance. The first, third and fifth legs were of 5 km each, the second and fourth legs were 10 km each, and the final leg covered the remaining 7.195 km.

The first edition saw the Kenyan men's team break the world record for the ekiden relay with a run of 2:00:02 hours. The Moroccan team at the following edition improved this further with a world and championship record time of 1:57:56 hours. The Ethiopian women's team set the championship record of 2:16:04 hours in 1996 and retained their title the following year. Kenya and Ethiopia were the most successful nations at the event – Kenya took three men's titles, as well as a women's silver and a men's bronze, while Ethiopia had two women's titles, three silver medals and one bronze medal.

The competition was preceded by the IAAF World Challenge Road Relay – a one-off race held in 1986 in Hiroshima.

== Editions ==
Edition in gold was held as the IAAF World Challenge Road Relay

Edition	Year	Location	Date	Men's teams	Women's teams	Athletes
–	1986	Hiroshima, Japan	30 November			
1st	1992	Funchal, Portugal	9–10 May			138
2nd	1994	Litochoro, Greece	16–17 April			240
3rd	1996	Copenhagen, Denmark	13–14 April	25	12	210
4th	1998	Manaus, Brazil	18–19 April	25	12	222

== Medallists ==
=== Men ===
Year	Gold		Silver		Bronze	
1986	Ethiopia; Wodajo Bulti; Debebe Demisse; Bekele Debele; Feyisa Melese; Abebe Mekonnen	1:59:11	Great Britain; Carl Thackery; Jon Solly; Mark Scrutton; David Clarke; Karl Harrison	1:59:14	Oceania; Steve Moneghetti; David Burridge; Andrew Lloyd; Chris Tobin; Adam Hoyle	2:00:12
1992	Kenya; Eliud Barngetuny; William Koech; Ezekiel Bitok; William Sigei; Richard Tum; William Mutwol	2:00:02 WR	Portugal; Carlos Patrício; Dionísio Castro; Alberto Maravilha; Juvenal Ribeiro; Juan Carlos Montero; Domingos Castro	2:01:34	United Kingdom; Carl Udall; David Clarke; John Mayock; Colin Walker; John Sherban; David Lewis	2:02:34
1994	Morocco; Brahim Jabbour; El-Arbi Khattabi; Hicham El Guerrouj; Salah Hissou; Brahim Boutayeb; Khalid Skah	1:57:56 WR CR	Ethiopia; Worku Bikila; Badilu Kibret; Abraham Assefa; Fita Bayisa; Chala Kelele; Haile Gebrselassie	1:58:51	Kenya; Peter Ndirangu; Joseph Kibor; Clement Kiprotich; Paul Yego; John Kiprono; Simon Rono	2:00:51
1996	Kenya; Simon Rono; Joseph Kimani; Mark Yatich; Stephen Kirwa; David Kipruto; William Kiptum	2:00:40	Brazil; Wander Moura; Vanderlei de Lima; Edgar de Oliveira; Delmir dos Santos; Tomix da Costa; Ronaldo da Costa	2:01:24	Ethiopia; Lemi Erpassa; Kidane Gebremichael; Sisay Bezebah; Abraham Assefa; Tegenu Abebe; Worku Bikila	2:01:50
1998	Kenya; John Kibowen; Paul Koech; Benjamin Limo; Thomas Nyariki; John Kosgei; Paul Kosgei	2:01:13	Ethiopia; Million Wolde; Ayele Mezgebu; Berhanu Aldane; Tesfaye Tola; Fita Bayisa; Alene Emire	2:03:47	Brazil; Elenilson da Silva; Tomix da Costa; Ronaldo da Costa; Daniel Ferreira; Leonardo Guedes; Sergio da Silva	2:04:50

=== Women ===
Year	Gold		Silver		Bronze	
1986	New Zealand; Lorraine Moller; Hazel Stewart; Mary O'Connor; Susan Bruce; Anne Audain; Ann Hare	2:18:18	Soviet Union; Tatyana Kazankina; Marina Rodchenkova; Lyudmila Matveyeva; Svetlana Guskova; Olga Bondarenko; Tatyana Samolenko	2:18:33	United States; Martha Cooksey; Francie Smith; Lisa Brady; Charly Haversat; Diane Brewer; Judy McCreery	2:19:11
1992	Portugal; Fernanda Marques; Aurora Cunha; Felicidade Sena; Conceição Ferreira; Fátima Neves; Fernanda Ribeiro	2:20:14	Denmark; Berit Worm; Dorthe Rasmussen; Anita Palshøj; Aino Slej; Nina Christiansen; Bettina Andersen	2:24:42	Spain; Begoña Herraez; Carmen Brunet; Cristina Nogue; Ana Isabel Alonso; Rocío Ríos; Rosa Perez	2:25:06
1994	Russia; Tatyana Pentukova; Nadezhda Galliamova; Elena Kavaklioglu; Natalya Sorokivaskaya; Yelena Romanova; Olga Churbanova	2:17:19	Ethiopia; Askale Bereda; Derartu Tulu; Leila Aman; Gadissie Edato; Birhan Dagne; Asha Gigi	2:19:09	Romania; Daniela Bran; Alina Tecuţa; Mariana Chirila; Anuța Cătună; Florina Pană; Iulia Negură	2:19:18
1996	Ethiopia; Genet Gebregiorgis; Birhane Adere; Ayelech Worku; Gete Wami; Getenesh Urge; Luchia Yishak	2:16:04 CR	Romania; Iulia Ionescu; Mariana Chirila; Lelia Deselnecu; Iulia Negură; Luminita Gogârlea; Elena Fidatov	2:18:41	Japan; Yukiko Okamoto; Naomi Sakashita; Ai Fukuchi; Ikuyo Goto; Noriko Ura; Eri Yamaguchi	2:18:58
1998	Ethiopia; Yimenashu Taye; Gete Wami; Genet Gebregiorgis; Asha Gigi; Ayelech Worku; Merima Denboba	2:21:15	Kenya; Jackline Maranga; Jane Omoro; Leah Malot; Susan Chepkemei; Naomi Mugo; Sally Barsosio	2:21:49	Romania; Stela Olteanu; Alina Tecuţa; Mariana Chirila; Cristina Pomacu; Constantina Diţă; Luminita Gogârlea	2:24:13

== Medal table ==
- NB: Excludes World Challenge Road Relay medals

Rank	Nation	Gold	Silver	Bronze	Total
1	Kenya (KEN)	3	1	1	5
2	Ethiopia (ETH)	2	3	1	6
3	Portugal (POR)	1	1	0	2
4	Morocco (MAR)	1	0	0	1
4	Russia (RUS)	1	0	0	1
6	Romania (ROM)	0	1	2	3
7	Brazil (BRA)	0	1	1	2
8	Denmark (DEN)	0	1	0	1
9	Great Britain (GBR)	0	0	1	1
9	Japan (JPN)	0	0	1	1
9	Spain (ESP)	0	0	1	1
Totals (11 entries)		8	8	8	24
