= Eliud Barngetuny =

Kenyan former long-distance runner

Medal record

Men's athletics

Representing Kenya

African Games
| Bronze medal – third place | 1995 Harare | 3000 m s'chase |

African Championships
| Bronze medal – third place | 1992 Belle Vue Maurel | 3000 m s'chase |

Eliud Barngetuny (born 20 May 1973) is a Kenyan former long-distance runner who specialised in the 3000 metres steeplechase. He was a continental bronze medallist at both the 1992 African Championships in Athletics and the 1995 All-Africa Games.

His career best performance in the steeplechase came in 1995, when he completed the distance in 8:05.01 minutes. This time was achieved at the Herculis meeting in Monaco behind the then-steeplechase world record holder Moses Kiptanui. The time ranked Barngetuny as the second fastest man ever at that point and as of 2016 it continues to rank him among the top thirty all-time for the event. This time provided him with his highest ever world seasonal ranking, although he also ranked fourth with 8.10.84 minutes in 1994 and sixth in 1997 with 8.05.84 minutes (the second best performance of his career).

Among his other honours were third place at the 1995 IAAF Grand Prix Final, as well as a gold medal and world record at the IAAF World Road Relay Championships in 1992, where he led off a Kenyan team of William Koech, Ezekiel Bitok, William Sigei, Richard Tum and William Mutwol to complete the ekiden marathon relay in 2:00:02 hours.

On the professional road running circuit he achieved wins at the Giro al Sas 10K run and the Vulcan Run. In cross country running he was twice champion at the Cross del Sud. On the track he had wins at the Drake Relays, Palio della Quercia and the Turin International Meeting. In his last high level outing, he ranked fourth at the 1997 IAAF Grand Prix Final.

== International competitions ==
| Year | Competition | Venue | Position | Event | Notes |
|---|---|---|---|---|---|
| 1992 | IAAF World Road Relay Championships | Funchal, Portugal | 1st | Marathon relay | 2:00:02 WR |
| 1992 | African Championships | Belle Vue Maurel, Mauritius | 3rd | 3000 m s'chase | 8:38.02 |
| 1995 | All-Africa Games | Harare, Zimbabwe | 3rd | 3000 m s'chase | 8:34.57 |
| 1995 | IAAF Grand Prix Final | Fontvieille, Monaco | 3rd | 3000 m s'chase | 8:07.42 |
| 1997 | IAAF Grand Prix Final | Fukuoka, Japan | 4th | 3000 m s'chase | 8:23.39 |
