= 1998 IAAF World Road Relay Championships =

- Dates: 18–19 April 1998
- Host city: Manaus, Brazil
- Level: Senior
- Type: Marathon relay
- Events: 2
- Participation: 222 athletes from 28 nations
- Individual Prize Money (US$): 1st: US$20,000; 2nd: $10,000; 3rd: $5000
- Team Prize Money (US$): 1st: $120,000; 2nd: $60,000; 3rd: $30,000

The 1998 IAAF World Road Relay Championships was the fourth and final edition of the global, international marathon relay competition, organised by the International Association of Athletics Federations (IAAF). The event took place on 18–19 April in Manaus, Brazil with the participation of 222 athletes from 28 nations. The women's race took place on Saturday 18 April, starting at 9:00 AM Amazon Standard Time, and featured twelve national teams comprising a total 72 athletes. The men's race took place on Sunday 19 April, also starting at 9:00 AM Amazon Standard Time, and featured 25 national teams comprising a total 150 athletes.

Each national team consisted of six athletes, who alternately covered six stages to complete the 42.195 km marathon distance. The first, third and fifth stages were of 5 km, the second and fourth stages were of 10 km, and the final stage covered the remaining 7.195 km. Rather than using the traditional baton associated with relay races, athletes passed a wrist band to their compatriots at end of each leg. Prize money totalling US$420,000 was awarded to the athletes of the medal-winning teams: $120,000 for the winning team, $60,000 for the silver medallists and $30,000 for third place, with the winnings split evenly between the team's six athletes.

The Ethiopian and Kenyan teams took the top two spots in both races, with the Ethiopian women being victorious in a time of 2:21:15 hours and the Kenyan men coming out on top in a time of 2:01:13 hours. These represented two title defences, as both teams won those races at the previous edition in 1996. Romania took the bronze medals in the women's race and the host nation, Brazil, came third in the men's race – the second time it reached the podium after being men's runners-up at the 1996 championships.

== Race summary ==
The women's race took place in difficult weather conditions, with high humidity and a temperature around 34 °C (93 °F). Kenya's Jackline Maranga led the pack in the first stage at 15:39 minutes, with Ethiopia's Yimenashu Taye 19 seconds in arrears and Japan's Takako Kotorida another 20 seconds back. On the second leg Gete Wami overhauled Kenya's Jane Omoro to put Ethiopia in first place, while Alina Tecuţă had the second fastest time to bring Romania into third place. Ethiopia extended its lead in the third leg through stage winner Genet Gebregiorgis and Miyo Nakano brought Japan to third again.

A strong leg four by Cristina Pomacu returned Romania to third place and Alla Zhilyaeva won the stage to bring Russia back up the ranks. Ayelech Worku cemented Ethiopia's lead by completing the fifth stage eleven seconds faster than Kenya's Naomi Mugo, now over a minute behind, while Romania's Constantina Diță pulled further away from fourth-placed Japan. Kenya's Sally Barsosio attempted to close down Ethiopia's Merima Denboba in the final leg, but was unable to do so, finishing over half a minute behind the Ethiopian despite her leg of 24:09 minutes. The conditions severely affected some of the teams: Russia trailed by three and a half minutes in the first leg due to Yelena Motalova struggling, Mexico's Judith Ramirez took nearly seven minutes longer than Russia's Zhilyaeva to finish her 10K fourth leg, and Ecuador's Sara Nivisela took nearly four minutes longer to complete the 5-kilometre fifth leg than did Ethiopia's Ayelech Worku.

The following morning, the weather conditions proved a little more amenable to the male runners, with humidity dropping to 85% and the temperature falling to 28 °C (82 °F). John Kibowen led off the Kenyan team as front runner and was narrowly edged out by Ethiopia's Million Wolde in the first stage, with both recording 13:44 minutes for the 5 km, and a battle for third emerged between Brazil's Elenilson da Silva and Portugal's Hélder Ornelas some 15 seconds adrift. Stage two saw Kenya emerge as clear leaders as Paul Koech gained 49 seconds on his Ethiopian rival Ayele Mezgebu. Behind them, Japan's Tomoaki Kunichika pulled level Alberto Maravilha (Portugal) and Tomix da Costa (Brazil) in the chase for third as the athletes neared the mid-point.

Benjamin Limo completed the fourth leg 24 seconds faster than the rest of the field to keep Kenya's lead. Brazil's Ronaldo da Costa gained a ten-second gap in third, with Japan (Masatoshi Ibata) and Portugal (Angelo Pacheco) both slowing in fourth and fifth. Tom Nyariki made it three consecutive stage wins for Kenya in the fifth leg, gaining over 40 seconds over second placed Ethiopian Tesfaye Tolla. Elijah Mutandiko's 33-minute 10K leg (second fastest of the stage) brought Zimbabwe into fifth place, as Portugal fell back. Ethiopia rallied in the fifth stage with Fita Bayisa running 5 km in 14:16 minutes to draw nearer to Kenya's John Kosgei. A poor run from Ethiopia's Alene Emere saw Kenyan Paul Malakwen Kosgei ease to victory with over two and a half minutes to spare. Consistency saw Brazil claim third place, with Sergio Goncalves da Silva finishing around a minute after the Ethiopian. Zimbabwe's Abel Chimukoko had the second fastest time of the final stage, which saw his mostly-barefooted team overhaul Japan for fourth place by a margin of three seconds. Denmark's Jorgen Gamborg failed to complete his last leg – the only athlete at the competition to do so – meaning his team was eliminated.

== Medal summary ==
| Event | Gold | | Silver | | Bronze | |
|---|---|---|---|---|---|---|
| Men's race | Kenya; John Kibowen; Paul Koech; Benjamin Limo; Tom Nyariki; John Kosgei; Paul Malakwen Kosgei | 2:01:13 | Ethiopia; Million Wolde; Ayele Mezgebu; Berhanu Aldane; Tesfaye Tola; Fita Bayisa; Alene Emire | 2:03:47 | Brazil; Elenilson da Silva; Tomix da Costa; Ronaldo da Costa; Daniel Ferreira; Leonardo Guedes; Sergio da Silva | 2:04:50 |
| Women's race | Ethiopia; Yimenashu Taye; Gete Wami; Genet Gebregiorgis; Asha Gigi; Ayelech Worku; Merima Denboba | 2:21:15 | Kenya; Jackline Maranga; Jane Omoro; Leah Malot; Susan Chepkemei; Naomi Mugo; Sally Barsosio | 2:21:49 | Romania; Stela Olteanu; Alina Tecuţă; Mariana Chirila; Cristina Pomacu; Constantina Diță; Luminita Gogârlea | 2:24:13 |

== Results ==
=== Men's race ===
Key: Fastest in stage

| Place | Team | Athlete | Stage | Time |
|---|---|---|---|---|
| 1 | Kenya | — | — | 2:01:13 |
| 1 | Kenya | John Kibowen | 1 | 13:44 |
| 1 | Kenya | Paul Koech | 2 | 28:40 |
| 1 | Kenya | Benjamin Limo | 3 | 14:04 |
| 1 | Kenya | Tom Nyariki | 4 | 29:33 |
| 1 | Kenya | John Kosgei | 5 | 14:28 |
| 1 | Kenya | Paul Malakwen Kosgei | 6 | 20:44 |
| 2 | Ethiopia | — | — | 2:03:47 |
| 2 | Ethiopia | Million Wolde | 1 | 13:44 |
| 2 | Ethiopia | Ayele Mezgebu | 2 | 29:29 |
| 2 | Ethiopia | Berhanu Aldane | 3 | 14:29 |
| 2 | Ethiopia | Tesfaye Tola | 4 | 30:14 |
| 2 | Ethiopia | Fita Bayisa | 5 | 14:16 |
| 2 | Ethiopia | Alene Emere | 6 | 21:35 |
| 3 | Brazil | — | — | 2:04:50 |
| 3 | Brazil | Elenilson da Silva | 1 | 13:59 |
| 3 | Brazil | Tomix da Costa | 2 | 30:14 |
| 3 | Brazil | Ronaldo da Costa | 3 | 14:28 |
| 3 | Brazil | Daniel Lopes Ferreira | 4 | 30:11 |
| 3 | Brazil | Leonardo Guedes | 5 | 14:43 |
| 3 | Brazil | Sergio Goncalves da Silva | 6 | 21:15 |
| 4 | Zimbabwe | — | — | 2:05:19 |
| 4 | Zimbabwe | Michael Ngaseke | 1 | 14:21 |
| 4 | Zimbabwe | Bigboy Goromonzi | 2 | 30:29 |
| 4 | Zimbabwe | Kingstone Maringe | 3 | 14:59 |
| 4 | Zimbabwe | Elijah Mutandiko | 4 | 30:00 |
| 4 | Zimbabwe | Tendai Chinhahu | 5 | 14:40 |
| 4 | Zimbabwe | Abel Chimukoko | 6 | 20:50 |
| 5 | Japan | — | — | 2:05:22 |
| 5 | Japan | Mitsuhiro Okuyama | 1 | 14:29 |
| 5 | Japan | Tomoaki Kunichika | 2 | 29:43 |
| 5 | Japan | Masatoshi Ibata | 3 | 14:40 |
| 5 | Japan | Akira Manai | 4 | 30:14 |
| 5 | Japan | Shinichi Akiyoshi | 5 | 14:35 |
| 5 | Japan | Takaki Morikawa | 6 | 21:39 |
| 6 | Portugal | — | — | 2:06:22 |
| 6 | Portugal | Hélder Ornelas | 1 | 14:00 |
| 6 | Portugal | Alberto Maravilha | 2 | 30:13 |
| 6 | Portugal | Angelo Pacheco | 3 | 14:52 |
| 6 | Portugal | Jose Santos | 4 | 30:57 |
| 6 | Portugal | Rui Borges | 5 | 15:09 |
| 6 | Portugal | Alberto Chaíça | 6 | 21:11 |
| 7 | Colombia | — | — | 2:06:55 |
| 7 | Colombia | Jacinto Navarrete | 1 | 14:41 |
| 7 | Colombia | Diego Colorado | 2 | 30:00 |
| 7 | Colombia | Mauricio Ladino | 3 | 14:31 |
| 7 | Colombia | Edgar Sanchez | 4 | 30:26 |
| 7 | Colombia | Juan Jaramillo | 5 | 15:19 |
| 7 | Colombia | Juan Carlos Gutierrez | 6 | 21:58 |
| 8 | South Africa | — | — | 2:06:56 |
| 8 | South Africa | Aaron Gabonewe | 1 | 14:13 |
| 8 | South Africa | Richard Mavuso | 2 | 31:33 |
| 8 | South Africa | Makhosonke Fika | 3 | 15:00 |
| 8 | South Africa | Simon Morolong | 4 | 30:31 |
| 8 | South Africa | Johannes Edwin Job | 5 | 14:29 |
| 8 | South Africa | Shadrack Hoff | 6 | 21:10 |
| 9 | Mexico | — | — | 2:07:19 |
| 9 | Mexico | Gustavo Castillo | 1 | 14:12 |
| 9 | Mexico | Alejandro Coatepitzin | 2 | 30:25 |
| 9 | Mexico | Ruben Garcia | 3 | 14:39 |
| 9 | Mexico | Ignacio Fragoso | 4 | 31:36 |
| 9 | Mexico | Fidel Torres | 5 | 14:47 |
| 9 | Mexico | Samuel Retiz | 6 | 21:40 |
| 10 | France | — | — | 2:08:22 |
| 10 | France | Mohamed Serbouti | 1 | 14:24 |
| 10 | France | Mikael Thomas | 2 | 30:12 |
| 10 | France | Augusto Gomes | 3 | 14:46 |
| 10 | France | Arnaud Crepieux | 4 | 31:29 |
| 10 | France | Ahmed El Asery | 5 | 15:08 |
| 10 | France | Cyrille Ballester | 6 | 22:23 |
| 11 | Great Britain | — | — | 2:09:59 |
| 11 | Great Britain | Julian Moorhouse | 1 | 14:30 |
| 11 | Great Britain | Dale Loughlin | 2 | 31:11 |
| 11 | Great Britain | James Starling | 3 | 15:10 |
| 11 | Great Britain | Ian Hudspith | 4 | 31:39 |
| 11 | Great Britain | Justin Pugsley | 5 | 15:18 |
| 11 | Great Britain | Glenn Stewart | 6 | 22:11 |
| 12 | Ecuador | — | — | 2:10:51 |
| 12 | Ecuador | Julio Chuqui | 1 | 14:44 |
| 12 | Ecuador | Franklin Tenorio | 2 | 30:21 |
| 12 | Ecuador | Jose Revelo | 3 | 15:45 |
| 12 | Ecuador | Nestor Quinapanta | 4 | 31:48 |
| 12 | Ecuador | Edy Punina | 5 | 15:38 |
| 12 | Ecuador | Miguel Romero | 6 | 22:35 |
| 13 | Argentina | — | — | 2:10:53 |
| 13 | Argentina | Juan José Cruz | 1 | 14:37 |
| 13 | Argentina | Antonio Ibanez | 2 | 30:49 |
| 13 | Argentina | Javier Carriqueo | 3 | 15:34 |
| 13 | Argentina | Jose Luis Luna | 4 | 32:00 |
| 13 | Argentina | Juan Carlos de Bastos | 5 | 15:29 |
| 13 | Argentina | Oscar Raimo | 6 | 22:24 |
| 14 | Venezuela | — | — | 2:11:13 |
| 14 | Venezuela | Lervis Arias | 1 | 14:33 |
| 14 | Venezuela | Tomas Zarraga | 2 | 31:08 |
| 14 | Venezuela | Leonel Guevara | 3 | 16:10 |
| 14 | Venezuela | José Alejandro Semprún | 4 | 31:07 |
| 14 | Venezuela | Pedro Mora | 5 | 15:39 |
| 14 | Venezuela | Luis Prieto | 6 | 22:36 |
| 15 | United States | — | — | 2:12:39 |
| 15 | United States | Mike Donnelly | 1 | 14:47 |
| 15 | United States | Daniel Mayer | 2 | 31:36 |
| 15 | United States | Teddy Mitchell | 3 | 16:23 |
| 15 | United States | Peter De La Cerda | 4 | 32:29 |
| 15 | United States | Mike Tansely | 5 | 15:08 |
| 15 | United States | Tim Gargiulo | 6 | 22:16 |
| 16 | Uruguay | — | — | 2:14:42 |
| 16 | Uruguay | Marcos Silva | 1 | 16:14 |
| 16 | Uruguay | Washington Veleda | 2 | 32:30 |
| 16 | Uruguay | Patricio Melo | 3 | 16:42 |
| 16 | Uruguay | Néstor García | 4 | 30:50 |
| 16 | Uruguay | Cristian Rosales | 5 | 15:07 |
| 16 | Uruguay | Nicolas Pereira | 6 | 23:19 |
| 17 | Bolivia | — | — | 2:15:16 |
| 17 | Bolivia | Maximo Poma | 1 | 15:35 |
| 17 | Bolivia | Policarpio Calizaya | 2 | 32:38 |
| 17 | Bolivia | Juan Carlos Echalar | 3 | 15:27 |
| 17 | Bolivia | Mariano Mamani | 4 | 33:01 |
| 17 | Bolivia | Miguel Nina | 5 | 15:42 |
| 17 | Bolivia | Geovanny Morejon | 6 | 22:53 |
| 18 | Chile | — | — | 2:17:03 |
| 18 | Chile | Mauricio Díaz | 1 | 14:53 |
| 18 | Chile | Daniel Herrera | 2 | 32:31 |
| 18 | Chile | Eduardo Carrasco | 3 | 15:41 |
| 18 | Chile | Leonidas Rivadeneira | 4 | 34:12 |
| 18 | Chile | Wilson Wall | 5 | 16:09 |
| 18 | Chile | Jaime Valenzuela | 6 | 23:37 |
| 19 | Peru | — | — | 2:18:49 |
| 19 | Peru | Joel Pineda | 1 | 15:26 |
| 19 | Peru | Julio Cutipa | 2 | 31:56 |
| 19 | Peru | Jorge Vara | 3 | 16:34 |
| 19 | Peru | Iban Acosta | 4 | 34:24 |
| 19 | Peru | Costantino Leon | 5 | 16:18 |
| 19 | Peru | Miguel Mamani | 6 | 24:11 |
| 20 | Panama | — | — | 2:20:47 |
| 20 | Panama | Simon Alvarado | 1 | 15:48 |
| 20 | Panama | Agustin Moran | 2 | 32:48 |
| 20 | Panama | Said Gomez | 3 | 16:00 |
| 20 | Panama | Raul Castro | 4 | 34:46 |
| 20 | Panama | Robert Smits | 5 | 17:01 |
| 20 | Panama | Guillermo Ramirez | 6 | 24:24 |
| 21 | Guyana | — | — | 2:24:59 |
| 21 | Guyana | Andrew Smith | 1 | 16:07 |
| 21 | Guyana | Neecharran Ramnauth | 2 | 34:06 |
| 21 | Guyana | Kelvin Johnson | 3 | 16:13 |
| 21 | Guyana | Errol Peters | 4 | 35:35 |
| 21 | Guyana | Yubraj Jaichand | 5 | 16:17 |
| 21 | Guyana | Odinga Bascome | 6 | 26:41 |
| 22 | Paraguay | — | — | 2:26:59 |
| 22 | Paraguay | William Panadero | 1 | 16:10 |
| 22 | Paraguay | Ramon Aranda | 2 | 34:07 |
| 22 | Paraguay | Lucas Panadero | 3 | 17:19 |
| 22 | Paraguay | Christian Gonzalez | 4 | 36:40 |
| 22 | Paraguay | Isaac Figueredo | 5 | 17:56 |
| 22 | Paraguay | Carlos Barrientos | 6 | 24:47 |
| 23 | Papua New Guinea | — | — | 2:27:01 |
| 23 | Papua New Guinea | David Rueben | 1 | 17:32 |
| 23 | Papua New Guinea | Ken Mova | 2 | 34:20 |
| 23 | Papua New Guinea | Anton Lopa | 3 | 17:23 |
| 23 | Papua New Guinea | David Kania | 4 | 33:56 |
| 23 | Papua New Guinea | Jeffrey Kaile | 5 | 18:31 |
| 23 | Papua New Guinea | Gumsie Taulobi | 6 | 25:19 |
| 24 | Suriname | — | — | 2:29:01 |
| 24 | Suriname | Jurmain Bijlhout | 1 | 17:24 |
| 24 | Suriname | Radjinder Patan | 2 | 36:05 |
| 24 | Suriname | Andre Joekoe | 3 | 17:10 |
| 24 | Suriname | Steven Vismale | 4 | 33:50 |
| 24 | Suriname | Roy Niamut | 5 | 18:32 |
| 24 | Suriname | Aziez Nandlal | 6 | 26:00 |
| — | Denmark | — | — | DNF |
| — | Denmark | Daw Nielsen | 1 | 14:50 |
| — | Denmark | Dennis Jensen | 2 | 30:37 |
| — | Denmark | Brian Jensen | 3 | 15:05 |
| — | Denmark | Carsten Jørgensen | 4 | 30:06 |
| — | Denmark | Johnny Moller | 5 | 15:17 |
| — | Denmark | Jorgen Gamborg | 6 | DNF |

=== Women's race ===
Key: Fastest in stage

| Place | Team | Athlete | Stage | Time |
|---|---|---|---|---|
| 1 | Ethiopia | — | — | 2:21:15 |
| 1 | Ethiopia | Yimenashu Taye | 1 | 15:58 |
| 1 | Ethiopia | Gete Wami | 2 | 33:07 |
| 1 | Ethiopia | Genet Gebregiorgis | 3 | 16:18 |
| 1 | Ethiopia | Asha Gigi | 4 | 35:00 |
| 1 | Ethiopia | Ayelech Worku | 5 | 16:18 |
| 1 | Ethiopia | Merima Denboba | 6 | 24:34 |
| 2 | Kenya | — | — | 2:21:49 |
| 2 | Kenya | Jackline Maranga | 1 | 15:39 |
| 2 | Kenya | Jane Omoro | 2 | 34:06 |
| 2 | Kenya | Leah Malot | 3 | 16:33 |
| 2 | Kenya | Susan Chepkemei | 4 | 34:53 |
| 2 | Kenya | Naomi Mugo | 5 | 16:29 |
| 2 | Kenya | Sally Barsosio | 6 | 24:09 |
| 3 | Romania | — | — | 2:24:13 |
| 3 | Romania | Stela Olteanu | 1 | 16:24 |
| 3 | Romania | Alina Tecuţă | 2 | 33:42 |
| 3 | Romania | Mariana Chirila | 3 | 17:15 |
| 3 | Romania | Cristina Pomacu | 4 | 34:33 |
| 3 | Romania | Constantina Diță | 5 | 16:42 |
| 3 | Romania | Luminita Gogirlea | 6 | 25:37 |
| 4 | Japan | — | — | 2:25:49 |
| 4 | Japan | Takako Kotorida | 1 | 16:18 |
| 4 | Japan | Masae Ueoka | 2 | 33:52 |
| 4 | Japan | Miyo Nakano | 3 | 16:53 |
| 4 | Japan | Yukiko Okamoto | 4 | 35:50 |
| 4 | Japan | Megumi Tanaka | 5 | 17:08 |
| 4 | Japan | Yumi Sato | 6 | 25:48 |
| 5 | United States | — | — | 2:29:36 |
| 5 | United States | Carmen Ayala-Troncoso | 1 | 17:07 |
| 5 | United States | Christine McNamara | 2 | 35:44 |
| 5 | United States | Victoria Mitchell | 3 | 17:07 |
| 5 | United States | Cindy James | 4 | 36:19 |
| 5 | United States | Blake Phillips | 5 | 16:51 |
| 5 | United States | Michele Chalmers | 6 | 26:28 |
| 6 | Russia | — | — | 2:30:04 |
| 6 | Russia | Yelena Motalova | 1 | 19:03 |
| 6 | Russia | Lyudmila Petrova | 2 | 35:33 |
| 6 | Russia | Oksana Zheleznyak | 3 | 17:26 |
| 6 | Russia | Alla Zhilyaeva | 4 | 34:10 |
| 6 | Russia | Yelena Kopytova | 5 | 16:48 |
| 6 | Russia | Viktoriya Nenasheva | 6 | 27:05 |
| 7 | China | — | — | 2:31:42 |
| 7 | China | Liu Jianying | 1 | 16:49 |
| 7 | China | Yang Siju | 2 | 35:12 |
| 7 | China | Liu Dong | 3 | 18:04 |
| 7 | China | Wang Mingxia | 4 | 36:15 |
| 7 | China | Wang Qingfen | 5 | 17:44 |
| 7 | China | Wang Dongmei | 6 | 27:38 |
| 8 | Brazil | — | — | 2:32:55 |
| 8 | Brazil | Ana Claudia de Souza | 1 | 16:59 |
| 8 | Brazil | Maria Lucia Vieira | 2 | 37:01 |
| 8 | Brazil | Celia dos Santos | 3 | 17:08 |
| 8 | Brazil | Rosangela Pereira Farias | 4 | 37:03 |
| 8 | Brazil | Solange de Souza | 5 | 17:42 |
| 8 | Brazil | Selma Candida dos Reis | 6 | 27:02 |
| 9 | France | — | — | 2:35:39 |
| 9 | France | Celine Rajot | 1 | 16:48 |
| 9 | France | Edunge Pitel | 2 | 38:05 |
| 9 | France | Stephanie Berthevas | 3 | 17:52 |
| 9 | France | Marie Christine Danpa | 4 | 38:09 |
| 9 | France | Yanma Belkacem | 5 | 17:55 |
| 9 | France | Veronique Bertel | 6 | 26:50 |
| 10 | South Africa | — | — | 2:37:33 |
| 10 | South Africa | Truzanne Swanepoel | 1 | 16:46 |
| 10 | South Africa | Ronell Thomas | 2 | 36:32 |
| 10 | South Africa | Zena Wilsnach | 3 | 18:06 |
| 10 | South Africa | Sarah Jane Nkala | 4 | 38:57 |
| 10 | South Africa | René Kalmer | 5 | 19:57 |
| 10 | South Africa | Charne Rademeyer | 6 | 27:15 |
| 11 | Ecuador | — | — | 2:40:20 |
| 11 | Ecuador | Janeth Caizalitín | 1 | 16:49 |
| 11 | Ecuador | Yolanda Quinbita | 2 | 39:43 |
| 11 | Ecuador | Lilian Guerra | 3 | 18:10 |
| 11 | Ecuador | Wilma Guerra | 4 | 37:19 |
| 11 | Ecuador | Sara Nivisela | 5 | 20:15 |
| 11 | Ecuador | Maria Paredes | 6 | 28:04 |
| 12 | Mexico | — | — | 2:44:02 |
| 12 | Mexico | Margarita Tapia | 1 | 18:09 |
| 12 | Mexico | Madaí Pérez | 2 | 38:59 |
| 12 | Mexico | Kayla Betancourt | 3 | 19:16 |
| 12 | Mexico | Judith Ramirez | 4 | 41:03 |
| 12 | Mexico | Giselle Bautista | 5 | 18:23 |
| 12 | Mexico | Sonia Betancourt | 6 | 28:12 |

== Participation ==
- Argentina (6)
- Bolivia (6)
- Brazil (12)
- Chile (6)
- China (6)
- Colombia (6)
- Denmark (6)
- Ecuador (12)
- Ethiopia (12)
- France (12)
- Great Britain (6)
- Guyana (6)
- Japan (12)
- Kenya (12)
- Mexico (12)
- Panama (6)
- Papua New Guinea (6)
- Paraguay (6)
- Peru (6)
- Portugal (6)
- Romania (6)
- Russia (6)
- South Africa (12)
- Suriname (6)
- United States (12)
- Uruguay (6)
- Venezuela (6)
- Zimbabwe (6)
