= Athletics at the 1990 Commonwealth Games – Women's 1500 metres =

Women's 1500 metres at the Commonwealth Games

The women's 1500 metres event at the 1990 Commonwealth Games was held on 2 and 3 February at the Mount Smart Stadium in Auckland.

== Medalists ==
Gold	Silver	Bronze
Angela Chalmers; Canada	Christina Cahill; England	Bev Nicholson; England

== Results ==
=== Heats ===
Qualification: First 5 of each heat (Q) and the next 2 fastest (q) qualified for the final.

Rank	Heat	Name	Nationality	Time	Notes
1	1	Lynne MacIntyre	Scotland	4:10.57	Q
2	1	Karen Hutcheson	Scotland	4:10.65	Q
3	1	Angela Chalmers	Canada	4:10.67	Q
4	1	Shireen Bailey	England	4:10.71	Q
5	1	Christine Pfitzinger	New Zealand	4:11.07	Q
6	1	Sarah Collins	Australia	4:12.26	q
7	2	Christina Cahill	England	4:14.76	Q
8	2	Debbie Bowker	Canada	4:15.29	Q
9	2	Bev Nicholson	England	4:15.50	Q
10	2	Yvonne Murray	Scotland	4:15.67	Q
11	2	Michelle Baumgartner	Australia	4:16.10	Q
12	2	Robyn Meagher	Canada	4:16.27	q
13	1	Ursula McKee	Northern Ireland	4:16.44	
14	2	Carolyn Schuwalow	Australia	4:16.58	
15	1	Anne Hare	New Zealand	4:20.25	
16	2	Debbie Sheddan	New Zealand	4:21.42	
17	1	Khanyisile Lukhele	Swaziland	4:48.65	

=== Final ===
Rank	Name	Nationality	Time	Notes
1st place, gold medalist(s)	Angela Chalmers	Canada	4:08.41	
2nd place, silver medalist(s)	Christina Cahill	England	4:08.75	
3rd place, bronze medalist(s)	Bev Nicholson	England	4:09.00	
4	Yvonne Murray	Scotland	4:09.54	
5	Lynne MacIntyre	Scotland	4:09.75	
6	Debbie Bowker	Canada	4:11.20	
7	Michelle Baumgartner	Australia	4:12.74	
8	Shireen Bailey	England	4:13.31	
9	Sarah Collins	Australia	4:13.52	
10	Karen Hutcheson	Scotland	4:13.77	
11	Christine Pfitzinger	New Zealand	4:17.36	
12	Robyn Meagher	Canada	4:28.51	
