= 1989 European Athletics Indoor Championships – Women's 1500 metres =

Athletics event

The women's 1500 metres event at the 1989 European Athletics Indoor Championships was held on 18 and 19 February.

== Medalists ==
Gold	Silver	Bronze
Paula Ivan; Romania	Marina Yachmenyova; Soviet Union	Svetlana Kitova; Soviet Union

== Results ==
=== Heats ===
First 3 from each heat (Q) and the next 2 fastest (q) qualified for the final.

Rank	Heat	Name	Nationality	Time	Notes
1	2	Małgorzata Rydz	Poland	4:11.15	Q
2	2	Marina Yachmenyova	Soviet Union	4:11.35	Q
3	2	Svetlana Kitova	Soviet Union	4:11.38	Q
4	2	Yvonne Mai	East Germany	4:11.38	q
5	1	Karen Hutcheson	Great Britain	4:13.47	Q
6	2	Malin Ewerlöf	Sweden	4:14.05	q
7	1	Paula Ivan	Romania	4:14.59	Q
8	1	Laima Baikauskaitė	Soviet Union	4:14.72	Q
9	1	Rita Marquard	West Germany	4:15.52	
10	1	Christien Toonstra	Netherlands	4:17.46	

=== Final ===
Rank	Name	Nationality	Time	Notes
1st place, gold medalist(s)	Paula Ivan	Romania	4:07.16	
2nd place, silver medalist(s)	Marina Yachmenyova	Soviet Union	4:07.77	
3rd place, bronze medalist(s)	Svetlana Kitova	Soviet Union	4:08.36	
4	Yvonne Mai	East Germany	4:09.40	
5	Małgorzata Rydz	Poland	4:09.42	
6	Laima Baikauskaitė	Soviet Union	4:10.49	
7	Karen Hutcheson	Great Britain	4:10.76	
8	Malin Ewerlöf	Sweden	4:11.70	
