= 1989 IAAF World Indoor Championships – Women's 1500 metres =

The women's 1500 metres event at the 1989 IAAF World Indoor Championships was held at the Budapest Sportcsarnok in Budapest on 4 March.

== Results ==
| Rank | Name | Nationality | Time | Notes |
|---|---|---|---|---|
| 1st place, gold medalist(s) | Doina Melinte | Romania | 4:04.79 | CR |
| 2nd place, silver medalist(s) | Svetlana Kitova | Soviet Union | 4:05.71 | PB |
| 3rd place, bronze medalist(s) | Yvonne Mai | East Germany | 4:06.09 | PB |
| 4 | Marina Yachmenyova | Soviet Union | 4:06.52 | PB |
| 5 | Mitiță Constantin | Romania | 4:09.74 | |
| 6 | Liz McColgan | Great Britain | 4:10.16 | PB |
| 7 | Karen Hutcheson | Great Britain | 4:11.37 | |
| 8 | Małgorzata Rydz | Poland | 4:17.53 | |
