= Lisa York =

Lisa York may refer to:

- Lisa York (actress) (born 1969), English actress
- Lisa York (runner) (born 1970), English Olympic athlete
