= Athletics at the 1981 Summer Universiade – Men's 5000 metres =

The men's 5000 metres event at the 1981 Summer Universiade was held at the Stadionul Naţional in Bucharest on 23 and 26 July 1981.

== Medalists ==
| Gold | Silver | Bronze |
|---|---|---|
| Doug Padilla; United States | Jozef Lenčéš; Czechoslovakia | Frank Zimmermann; West Germany |

== Results ==
=== Heats ===
| Rank | Heat | Athlete | Nationality | Time | Notes |
|---|---|---|---|---|---|
| 1 | 1 | Jozef Lenčéš | Czechoslovakia | 13:54.07 | Q |
| 2 | 1 | Dave Clarke | Great Britain | 13:54.19 | Q |
| 3 | 1 | Vladimir Shesterov | Soviet Union | 13:54.59 | Q |
| 4 | 1 | Ivan Uvizl | Czechoslovakia | 13:55.27 | Q |
| 5 | 1 | Doug Padilla | United States | 13:55.47 | Q |
| 6 | 1 | Aurel Niculescu | Romania | 13:5?.?? | Q |
| 7 | 1 | Petko Karpachev | Bulgaria | 13:56.31 | q |
| 8 | 1 | Yutaka Kanai | Japan | 14:03.78 | q |
| 9 | 1 | Mehmet Yürdadön | Turkey | 14:23.83 | |
| 10 | 1 | Martín Pitayo | Mexico | 14:49.17 | |
| 11 | 1 | Ahmed Hassoune | Lebanon | 16:37.29 | |
| 12 | 1 | Phiri Clemens | Zimbabwe | 18:28.00 | |
| | 1 | Gamal Dhawi | Libya | DNF | |
| 1 | 2 | Frank Zimmermann | West Germany | 14:01.95 | Q |
| 2 | 2 | Piero Selvaggio | Italy | 14:03.85 | Q |
| 3 | 2 | Shane Marshall | New Zealand | 14:04.80 | Q |
| 4 | 2 | Necdet Ayaz | Turkey | 14:05.17 | Q |
| 5 | 2 | Gyorgy Marko | Romania | 14:06.28 | Q |
| 6 | 2 | Shinobu Murakoshi | Japan | 14:06.97 | Q |
| 7 | 2 | Jim Stintzi | United States | 14:08.14 | q |
| 8 | 2 | Steve Foley | Australia | 14:12.85 | |
| 9 | 2 | Pertti Tiainen | Finland | 14:31.71 | |
| 10 | 2 | Rumen Mekhandzhinski | Bulgaria | 14:43.87 | |
| 11 | 2 | Mohamed Kolo | Nigeria | 14:45.97 | |
| 12 | 2 | Ali Hufane | Somalia | 14:56.00 | |
| 13 | 2 | Mihsin Kudair | Iraq | 14:56.35 | |
| 14 | 2 | El Monge Al-Seaba | Libya | 15:04.28 | |

=== Final ===
| Rank | Athlete | Nationality | Time | Notes |
|---|---|---|---|---|
| 1st place, gold medalist(s) | Doug Padilla | United States | 13:49.95 | |
| 2nd place, silver medalist(s) | Jozef Lenčéš | Czechoslovakia | 13:50.34 | |
| 3rd place, bronze medalist(s) | Frank Zimmermann | West Germany | 13:50.84 | |
| 4 | Piero Selvaggio | Italy | 13:51.72 | |
| 5 | Ivan Uvizl | Czechoslovakia | 13:54.11 | |
| 6 | Dave Clarke | Great Britain | 13:54.66 | |
| 7 | Aurel Niculescu | Romania | 13:55.36 | |
| 8 | Jim Stintzi | United States | 13:55.81 | |
| 9 | Vladimir Shesterov | Soviet Union | 13:57.88 | |
| 10 | Necdet Ayaz | Turkey | 13:58.72 | |
| 11 | Gyorgy Marko | Romania | 14:01.85 | |
| 12 | Petko Karpachev | Bulgaria | 14:06.45 | |
| 13 | Shane Marshall | New Zealand | 14:15.88 | |
| 14 | Yutaka Kanai | Japan | 14:23.31 | |
| 15 | Shinobu Murakoshi | Japan | 14:48.84 | |
