= Athletics at the 1990 Commonwealth Games – Women's 3000 metres =

Women's 3000 metres at the Commonwealth Games

The women's 3000 metres event at the 1990 Commonwealth Games was held on 28 January at the Mount Smart Stadium in Auckland.

== Results ==
Rank	Name	Nationality	Time	Notes
1st place, gold medalist(s)	Angela Chalmers	Canada	8:38.38	GR
2nd place, silver medalist(s)	Yvonne Murray	Scotland	8:39.46	
3rd place, bronze medalist(s)	Liz McColgan	Scotland	8:47.66	
4	Karen Hutcheson	Scotland	8:48.72	
5	Carolyn Schuwalow	Australia	8:53.89	
6	Ruth Partridge	England	8:59.77	
7	Leah Pells	Canada	9:02.29	
8	Jenny Lund	Australia	9:03.43	
9	Lizanne Bussières	Canada	9:04.59	
10	Anne Hare	New Zealand	9:15.49	
11	Alison Wyeth	England	9:23.12	
12	Sonia Barry	New Zealand	9:25.91	
13	Brenda Walker	Isle of Man	9:36.90	
14	Annie Kagona	Malawi	9:51.41	
15	Khanyisile Lukhele	Swaziland	10:15.63	
	Christine Pfitzinger	New Zealand	DNF	
	Nicky Morris	England	DNF	
	Susan Hobson	Australia	DNF	
	Andri Avraam	Cyprus	DNS	
	Ursula McKee	Northern Ireland	DNS	
