= Dave Clarke (runner) =

British athlete

Personal information
- Nationality: British (English)
- Born: 1 January 1958 (age 68) London, England

Sport
- Sport: Athletics
- Event: long-distance
- Club: Hercules Wimbledon Athletics Club
Medal record
Representing Great Britain and England
World Road Relay Championships
Silver medal – second place	1986 Hiroshima	Men's race
World Cross Country Championships
Silver medal – second place	1982 Rome	Men's team
Silver medal – second place	1987 Warsaw	Men's team
Silver medal – second place	1989 Stavanger	Men's team
Bronze medal – third place	1992 Boston	Men's team

David Robert Clarke (born 1 January 1958) is a British former distance runner who competed over distances from the 1500 metres to the marathon. He represented Great Britain over 5000 metres at the 1983 World Championships in Athletics and the 1981 Summer Universiade.

== Biography ==
Clark, born in London, attended Dulwich Prep London and then St Paul's School, London, where he took up running, as did his brothers Peter and Chris. Professionally, he worked as a labourer and hospital porter before becoming a history and physical education teacher. made twelve appearances at the IAAF World Cross Country Championships from 1977 to 1995. Individually, his best performance came at the 1983 IAAF World Cross Country Championships, where he placed seventh overall.

Clarke was a three-time silver medallist in the men's team competition (1982, 1987, 1989) and also won a team bronze in 1992.

He ranked in the top twenty in the world over 10,000 metres in the 1982 season. He shares the British record in the ekiden marathon relay, alongside Carl Thackery, Jon Solly, Mark Scrutton, and Karl Harrison, with a silver medal-winning time of 1:59:14 hours set at the 1986 IAAF World Challenge Road Relay.

In national competition he won the 5000 m title at the 1981 UK Athletics Championships, and was runner-up in that event at the 1983 AAA Championships. He won the English Cross Country Championships three times (1982, 1987, 1988) and won the British Cross Country Championships in 1992. He was also twice runner-up at the British race and a four-time runner-up at the English Championships. He won the British Universities Cross Country Championships in 1981. At sub-national level he won the 1984 title in the 3000 metres at the South of England Athletics Championships and the 5000 m inter-county race at the 1985 CAU Championships. On the professional circuit he won races including the Cross di Volpiano, Amatrice-Configno, Foulée Suresnoise, 1989 Stockholm Marathon and the Cross de Nantes.

He continues to take part in the sport as a masters athlete, mostly in local parkruns, though he completed the 2016 London Marathon in 3:03:54 hours.

== International competitions ==
Year	Competition	Venue	Position	Event	Notes
1977	World Cross Country Championships	Düsseldorf, West Germany	23rd	Junior race	24:28
1977	World Cross Country Championships	Düsseldorf, West Germany	4th	Junior team	80 pts
1981	World Cross Country Championships	Madrid, Spain	38th	Senior race	35:59
1981	World Cross Country Championships	Madrid, Spain	6th	Team	312 pts
1981	Universiade	Bucharest, Romania	6th	5000 m	13:54.66
1982	World Cross Country Championships	Rome, Italy	9th	Senior race	34:19.4
1982	World Cross Country Championships	Rome, Italy	2nd	Team	114 pts
1983	World Cross Country Championships	Gateshead, United Kingdom	7th	Senior race	37:05
1983	World Cross Country Championships	Gateshead, United Kingdom	8th	Team	318 pts
1983	World Championships	Helsinki, Finland	11th (semis)	5000 m	13:58.37
1985	World Cross Country Championships	Lisbon, Portugal	26th	Senior race	34:23
1985	World Cross Country Championships	Lisbon, Portugal	8th	Team	437 pts
1986	World Cross Country Championships	Colombier, Switzerland	16th	Senior race	36:14.4
1986	World Cross Country Championships	Colombier, Switzerland	8th	Team	360 pts
1987	World Cross Country Championships	Warsaw, Poland	10th	Senior race	37:10
1987	World Cross Country Championships	Warsaw, Poland	2nd	Team	146 pts
1989	World Cross Country Championships	Stavanger, Norway	15th	Senior race	40:56
1989	World Cross Country Championships	Stavanger, Norway	2nd	Team	147 pts
1992	World Cross Country Championships	Boston, United States	20th	Senior race	37:52
1992	World Cross Country Championships	Boston, United States	3rd	Team	147 pts
1993	World Cross Country Championships	Amorebieta-Etxano, Spain	111th	Senior race	35:28
1993	World Cross Country Championships	Amorebieta-Etxano, Spain	7th	Team	353 pts
1994	World Cross Country Championships	Budapest, Hungary	55th	Senior race	36:24
1994	World Cross Country Championships	Budapest, Hungary	8th	Team	444 pts
1995	World Cross Country Championships	Durham, United Kingdom	77th	Senior race	36:17
1995	World Cross Country Championships	Durham, United Kingdom	9th	Team	354 pts
1990	International Chiba Ekiden	Chiba, Japan	6th	10K	28:20
1990	International Chiba Ekiden	Chiba, Japan	5th	Marathon relay	2:02:05

== Achievements ==
=== National titles ===
- English Cross Country Championships
  - Long course: 1982, 1987, 1988
- British Cross Country Championships
  - Long course: 1992
- AAA Road Relay Championship: 1979 (leg 4)

=== Circuit wins ===
- Cross di Volpiano: 1982, 1983
- Amatrice-Configno: 1983
- Foulée Suresnoise: 1987
- Stockholm Marathon: 1989
- Cross de Nantes: 1989, 1990

=== Personal bests ===
- 1500 metres – 3:39.27 (1982)
- Mile run – 3:56.95 (1982)
- 3000 metres – 7:57.88 (1984)
- 5000 metres – 13:22.54 (1983)
- 10,000 metres – 27:55.77 (1982)
- Marathon – 2:13:34 (1989)
