= Sonia McGeorge =

English runner

Sonia McGeorge née Vinal
Personal information
- Born: 2 November 1964 (age 61) Upper Beeding, England
- Height: 1.70 m (5 ft 7 in)
- Weight: 53 kg (117 lb)

Sport
- Sport: Track and field
- Events: 1500 m, 3000 m, 5000 m
- Club: Brighton & Harriersowe Athletic Club

Sonia Marian McGeorge (née Vinal; born 2 November 1964 in Upper Beeding) is an English retired athlete who specialised in the middle- and long-distance events.

== Biography ==
McGeorge represented Great Britain at the 1996 Summer Olympics and 1993 World Championships without qualifying for the final.

McGeorge became the British 3000 metres champion after winning the British AAA Championships title at the 1994 AAA Championships.

She represented England in the 3,000 metres event, at the 1994 Commonwealth Games in Victoria, Canada.

== Competition record ==
Year	Competition	Venue	Position	Event	Notes
Representing Great Britain / England
1990	European Indoor Championships	Glasgow, United Kingdom	8th	3000 m	9:11.60
1990	European Championships	Split, Yugoslavia	8th	3000 m	8:51:33
1991	World Indoor Championships	Seville, Spain	7th	3000 m	8:56.67
1993	World Championships	Stuttgart, Germany	16th (h)	1500 m	4:12.93
1994	European Indoor Championships	Paris, France	8th	3000 m	9:14.04
1994	European Championships	Helsinki, Finland	11th	3000 m	8:51:55
1994	Commonwealth Games	Victoria, Canada	4th	3000 m	8:54.91
1996	Olympic Games	Atlanta, United States	39th (h)	5000 m	16:01.92
(h) Indictaes overall position in qualifying heats

== Personal bests ==
Outdoor

- 1500 metres – 4:10.75 (London 1990)
- One mile – 4:33.12 (Gateshead 1994)
- 3000 metres – 8:51.33 (Split 1990)
- 5000 metres – 15:29.04 (Hengelo 1996)

Indoor

- 3000 metres – 8:56.67 (Seville 1991)

== Coaching career ==
In 2001 Sonia and her husband Chris McGeorge began their coaching careers.

The pair work as a team and are based in Loughborough.

Sonia and Chris coach/support notable endurance athletes including Charlotte Moore (runner), Matthew Stonier, Luke Nuttall, Izzy Fry and Ben Pattison.

In 2022 Sonia and Chris' coaching work was recognised by England Athletics as they were presented with the Dave Sunderland Coaching Award.
