= Yelena Motalova =

Russian long-distance runner

Yelena Motalova (Russian: Елена Моталова; born 28 January 1971) is a long-distance runner from Russia, who specializes mainly in the 3000 metres steeplechase. She is a former world record holder in this obstacle race, clocking 9:48.88 on 31 July 1999 in Tula. She was the Russian national champion in the steeplechase in 1999. She competed at the 1998 IAAF World Road Relay Championships for Russia and led off her team to sixth place. She won the Murtenlauf in 1999 and the Annecy Half Marathon in 2001.

== International competitions ==
Year	Competition	Venue	Position	Event	Notes
1998	World Road Relay Championships	Manaus, Brazil	6th	Marathon relay	2:30:04
1999	IAAF World Cross Country Championships	Belfast, United Kingdom	53rd	Short race	16:43
1999	IAAF World Cross Country Championships	Belfast, United Kingdom	10th	Team	181 pts
1999	Military World Games	Zagreb, Croatia	5th	5000 m	15:56.05

== National titles ==
- Russian Athletics Championships
  - 3000 m steeplechase: 1999

Records
Preceded by Daniela Petrescu	Women's 3000 m steeplechase World Record Holder; July 31, 1999 – August 7, 2000	Succeeded by Cristina Casandra
Sporting positions
Preceded by Daniela Petrescu	Women's 3000 m steeplechase Best Year Performance; 1999	Succeeded by Cristina Casandra
