= Karen Hutcheson =

Scottish runner (born 1965)

Karen Hargrave née Hutcheson
Personal information
- Nationality: British (Scottish)
- Born: 23 September 1965 (age 60)

Sport
- Sport: Athletics
- Event: middle-distance
- Club: Pitreavie AAC

Karen Hargrave (née Hutcheson, born 23 September 1965) is a Scottish retired middle and long-distance runner. She finished fourth in the 3000 metres at the 1990 Commonwealth Games for Scotland, and finished seventh in the 1500 metres representing Great Britain at the 1989 IAAF World Indoor Championships.

== Biography ==
Hutcheson, who was a member of Pitreavie AAC, finished third in the 800 metres at the 1986 and 1987 AAA Indoor Championships and third in the 1500 metres at the 1987 UK Championships. In 1989, she won the AAA Indoor Championship 1500 metres title, and went on to finish seventh in the 1500 metres at both the 1989 European Indoor Championships and the 1989 World Indoor Championships.

Hutcheson finished second to Liz McColgan in the 3000 metres at the 1989 UK Championships in June, running 9:00.61, before achieving her lifetime best for the 1500 metres with 4:09.46 on 4 September in Budapest. She went on to have perhaps her best career result at the Commonwealth Games in January 1990. In a race won by the Canadian Angela Chalmers, she improved her personal best by almost 12 seconds, running 8:48.72, to finish fourth behind Scottish teammates Yvonne Murray and McColgan. She also finished tenth in the 1500 metres final. A month after the Commonwealth Games, she competed at the European Indoor Championships in Glasgow, where she failed to finish in the 3000 metres.

Hutcheson finished third in the 3000 metres at the 1991 UK Championships, and third behind Ann Williams in the 1,500 metres event at the 1991 AAA Championships.

Competing as Karen Hargrave, she ran a 5 km road best of 16:13 in London in 1995.

== International competitions ==
Year	Competition	Venue	Position	Event	Notes
Representing Great Britain / Scotland
1989	European Indoor Championships	The Hague, Netherlands	7th	3000 m	4:10.76
1989	World Indoor Championships	Budapest, Hungary	7th	1500 m	4:11.37
1990	Commonwealth Games	Auckland, New Zealand	10th	1500 m	4:13.77
1990	Commonwealth Games	Auckland, New Zealand	4th	3000 m	8:48.72
1990	European Indoor Championships	Glasgow, United Kingdom	—	3000 m	DNF
