= Athletics at the 1994 Commonwealth Games – Women's 3000 metres =

Women's 3000 metres at the Commonwealth Games

The women's 3000 metres event at the 1994 Commonwealth Games was held in Victoria, British Columbia on 23 August 1994.

The winning margin was a colossal 13.42 seconds which as of 2024 remains the only time the women's 3,000 metres was won by more than 8 seconds at these games. This event was discontinued after the 1994 games so this record cannot be broken.

== Results ==
| Rank | Name | Nationality | Time | Notes |
|---|---|---|---|---|
| 1st place, gold medalist(s) | Angela Chalmers | Canada | 8:32:17 | GR |
| 2nd place, silver medalist(s) | Robyn Meagher | Canada | 8:45.59 | |
| 3rd place, bronze medalist(s) | Alison Wyeth | England | 8:47.98 | |
| 4 | Sonia McGeorge | England | 8:54.91 | |
| 5 | Susan Power | Australia | 8:59.23 | |
| 6 | Rose Cheruiyot | Kenya | 9:00.89 | |
| 7 | Leah Pells | Canada | 9:03.66 | |
| 8 | Laura Adam | Scotland | 9:06.63 | |
| 9 | Gwen Griffiths | South Africa | 9:15.47 | |
| 10 | Eunice Sagero | Kenya | 9:18.15 | |
| 11 | Jackline Okemwa | Kenya | 9:28.24 | |
| 12 | Chan Man Yee | Hong Kong | 9:37.10 | |
| 13 | Elizabeth Mongudhi | England | 9:38.95 | |
| 14 | Hawa Hamis Hussein | Tanzania | 9:42.80 | |
| 15 | Rosemary Turare | Papua New Guinea | 10:16.11 | |
| 16 | Molena Moshao | Lesotho | 10:29.50 | |
| | Palaniappan Jayanthi | Malaysia | DNS | |
| | Yvonne Murray | Scotland | DNS | |
