= Athletics at the 1989 Summer Universiade – Women's 1500 metres =

The women's 1500 metres event at the 1989 Summer Universiade was held at the Wedaustadion in Duisburg on 27 and 28 August 1989.

== Medalists ==
Gold	Silver	Bronze
Paula Ivan; Romania	Suzy Favor; United States	Lyudmila Rogachova; Soviet Union

== Results ==
=== Heats ===
Rank	Heat	Athlete	Nationality	Time	Notes
1	2	Paula Ivan	Romania	4:15.87	Q
2	2	Suzy Favor	United States	4:16.37	Q
3	2	Katalin Rácz	Hungary	4:17.08	Q
4	2	Ursula McKee	Ireland	4:17.18	Q
5	2	Rita Cassia Jesus	Brazil	4:17.22	Q
6	2	Robyn Meagher	Canada	4:17.42	q
7	1	Heike Oehme	East Germany	4:23.50	Q
8	1	Lyudmila Rogachova	Soviet Union	4:23.53	Q
9	1	Violeta Beclea	Romania	4:23.64	Q
10	1	Beverley Nicholson	Great Britain	4:23.93	Q
11	1	Leah Pells	Canada	4:24.03	Q
12	1	Gina Procaccio	United States	4:25.78	q
13	2	Mao Yujie	China	4:27.19	
14	2	Salina Chirchir	Kenya	4:32.07	
15	1	Mariama Barry	Guinea	5:17.58	
16	1	Woo Chui Ying	Hong Kong	5:27.02	

=== Final ===
Rank	Athlete	Nationality	Time	Notes
1st place, gold medalist(s)	Paula Ivan	Romania	4:13.58	
2nd place, silver medalist(s)	Suzy Favor	United States	4:14.92	
3rd place, bronze medalist(s)	Lyudmila Rogachova	Soviet Union	4:15.11	
4	Heike Oehme	East Germany	4:15.46	
5	Beverley Nicholson	Great Britain	4:18.07	
6	Katalin Rácz	Hungary	4:18.31	
7	Leah Pells	Canada	4:18.50	
8	Violeta Beclea	Romania	4:19.33	
9	Ursula McKee	Ireland	4:20.77	
10	Rita Cassia Jesus	Brazil	4:23.10	
11	Gina Procaccio	United States	4:23.98	
12	Robyn Meagher	Canada	4:24.75	
