= 1994 European Athletics Indoor Championships – Women's 3000 metres =

The women's 3000 metres event at the 1994 European Athletics Indoor Championships was held in Palais Omnisports de Paris-Bercy on 11 March.

== Results ==
Rank	Name	Nationality	Time	Notes
1st place, gold medalist(s)	Fernanda Ribeiro	Portugal	8:50.47	NR
2nd place, silver medalist(s)	Margareta Keszeg	Romania	8:55.61	
3rd place, bronze medalist(s)	Anna Brzezińska	Poland	8:56.90	NR
4	Christina Mai	Germany	8:57.49	
5	Laurence Vivier	France	8:59.95	
6	Alison Wyeth	Great Britain	9:04.35	
7	Renata Sobiesiak	Poland	9:09.09	
8	Sonia McGeorge	Great Britain	9:14.04	
9	Elly van Hulst	Netherlands	9:17.91	
10	Natalia Azpiazu	Spain	9:26.87	
	Marina Bastos	Portugal	DNF	
	Elisa Rea	Italy	DNF	
	Olga Kovpotina	Russia	DNF	
