= Bev Hartigan =

English runner (born 1967)

Bev Hartigan née Nicholson
Personal information
- Nationality: British (English)
- Born: 10 June 1967 (age 59) Durham, England

Sport
- Sport: Athletics
- Event: middle distance
- Club: Sale Harriers
Medal record
Athletics
Representing England
Commonwealth Games
Bronze medal – third place	1990 Auckland	1500m

Beverley Jane Hartigan (née Nicholson, born 10 June 1967) is a female English former middle and long-distance runner. She won a bronze medal in the 1500 metres at the 1990 Commonwealth Games, twice won the AAA Championships 1500 m title (1987/89) and twice won the UK Championship 1500 m title (1988/92). She went on to finish sixth in the marathon at the 2002 Commonwealth Games.

== Biography ==
Competing as Bev Nicholson, she first came to prominence when she defeated Shireen Bailey to win the 1500 m title at the 1987 WAAA Championships. In June 1988, she won the 1500 m title at the UK Championships. Two months later she finished fourth in the 1500m final at the 1988 AAA Championships/Olympic Trial, behind Chris Cahill, Bailey and Kirsty Wade, narrowly missing Olympic selection. The following year she defeated Alison Wyeth and Olympic finalist Bailey, to win the 1500m title at the 1989 AAA Championships, to earn Commonwealth Games selection for England, and went on to win a bronze medal in the 1500 m final at the Commonwealth Games in January 1990.

She was once again a contender for Olympic selection in 1992, and won the 1992 UK Championships, ahead of Kirsty Wade (2nd) and Liz McColgan (5th), but a few weeks later could only finish 10th at the 1992 AAA Championships/Olympic Trial, missing out on selection.

Now competing as Bev Hartigan, she finished 31st in December 1994 at the European Cross Country Championships and 24th at the 1995 IAAF World Cross Country Championships. 1995 also saw her run a 10 km road best of 33:02 in Belfast in April.

Hartigan ran 2:37:45 at the 2001 London Marathon, before improving to 2:36:02 at the 2001 Berlin Marathon. She went on to finish sixth in the marathon at the 2002 Commonwealth Games, running 2:41:27.

== International competitions ==
Year	Competition	Venue	Position	Event	Notes
Representing Great Britain / England
1989	European Cup	Gateshead, United Kingdom	6th	1500 m	4:09.32
1990	Commonwealth Games	Auckland, New Zealand	3rd	1500 m	4:09.00
1990	European Championships	Split, Yugoslavia	15th (h)	1500 m	4:23.80
1994	European Cross Country Championships	Alnwick, United Kingdom	31st	4.5 km	15:13
1995	World Cross Country Championships	Durham, United Kingdom	24th	6.5 km	21:21
2002	Commonwealth Games	Manchester, United Kingdom	6th	Marathon	2:41:26
(h) Indicates overall position in qualifying heats

=== National titles ===
- AAA Championships 1500 m (1987, 1989)
- UK Championships 1500 m (1988, 1992)

=== Personal bests ===
- 800m — 2:00.39 (1988)
- 1500m — 4:05.66 (1990)
- Mile — 4:26.52 (1992)
- 5 km (road) — 15:49 (1995)
- 10 km (road) — 33:02 (1995)
- Half-marathon — 74:06 (2001)
- Marathon — 2:36:02 (2001)
