= Robyn Meagher =

Canadian runner

Personal information
- Born: Robyn Adair Meagher; June 17, 1967 (age 59) Mulgrave, Nova Scotia, Canada
- Education: University of Victoria
- Height: 1.67 m (5 ft 6 in)
- Weight: 54 kg (119 lb)
- Spouse: Jason Dorland (rower)

Sport
- Sport: Running
- Events: 1500 m, 3000 m, 5000 m
- Club: Island Pacific Racing Team
Medal record
Representing Canada
Commonwealth Games
Silver medal – second place	1994 Victoria	3000 m

Robyn Adair Meagher (born June 17, 1967) is a retired Canadian middle and long-distance runner. She represented her country at the 1992 and 1996 Summer Olympics, as well as three World Championships. In addition, she won a silver medal at the 1994 Commonwealth Games.

Meagher was inducted into the University of Victoria’s Sport Hall of Fame in 2007; and, inducted into the Nova Scotia Sports Hall of Fame in 2010.

Meagher is a Registered Clinical Counsellor and Health & Performance Coach She is married to rower Jason Dorland.

== Competition record ==
Year	Competition	Venue	Position	Event	Notes
Representing Canada
1984	Pan American Junior Championships	Nassau, Bahamas	2nd	1500 m	4:21.8
1989	Jeux de la Francophonie	Casablanca, Morocco	2nd	1500 m	4:13.71
1989	Universiade	Duisburg, West Germany	12th	1500 m	4:24.75
1990	Commonwealth Games	Auckland, New Zealand	12th	1500 m	4:28.51
1990	Goodwill Games	Seattle, United States	6th	1500 m	4:13.74
1991	World Championships	Tokyo, Japan	23rd (h)	1500 m	4:12.47
1991	World Championships	Tokyo, Japan	29th (h)	3000 m	9:20.38
1992	Olympic Games	Barcelona, Spain	12th (h)	3000 m	8:49.72
1994	Commonwealth Games	Victoria, British Columbia, Canada	7th	1500 m	4:13.91
1994	Commonwealth Games	Victoria, British Columbia, Canada	2nd	3000 m	8:45.59
1994	World Cup	London, United Kingdom	2nd	3000 m	9:05.81
1996	Olympic Games	Atlanta, United States	43rd (h)	5000 m	16:24.49
1997	World Championships	Athens, Greece	11th	1500 m	4:10.83
1999	World Championships	Seville, Spain	17th (h)	1500 m	4:06.88
2001	Jeux de la Francophonie	Ottawa, Ontario, Canada	6th	1500 m	4:19.52

== Personal bests ==
Outdoor

- 800 metres – 2:05.02 (Richmond 1999)
- 1000 metres – 2:44.60 (Hamilton 1998)
- 1500 metres – 4:06.79 (Sherbrooke 1999)
- Mile – 4:26.07 (Sheffield 1992)
- 3000 metres – 8:43.71 (Brussels 1992)
- 5000 metres – 15:21.15 (Turin 1992)
