= 1986 IAAF World Challenge Road Relay =

- Dates: 30 November 1986
- Host city: Hiroshima, Japan
- Level: Senior
- Type: Marathon relay
- Events: 2

The 1986 IAAF World Challenge Road Relay was a one-off global, international marathon relay competition, organised by the International Association of Athletics Federations (IAAF). It marked the first time that the IAAF had formally hosted an ekiden competition, and preceded the formation of a world championship event, the IAAF World Road Relay Championships six years later. The event took place on 30 November in Hiroshima, Japan.

Each men's national team consisted of five athletes and each women's national team consisted of six athletes who alternately covered stages varying between 4.195 and 12.195 kilometres each to complete the 42.195 km marathon distance. The first four stages were of the same length for both sexes, with legs of 10 km, 8 km, 7 km, and 5 km opening the competition. The fifth and final leg for men was over 12.195 km while this distance was split into two final legs for women of 8 km and 4.195 km.

In the men's race, Carl Thackery put the British ahead by three seconds on the first leg, with Ethiopia's Wodajo Bulti in pursuit. Jon Solly extended Britain's lead by 31 seconds in the second leg. Takeyuki Nakayama won the third stage, bringing Japan back towards contention, while Britain maintained its lead over Ethiopia. Mauricio González took the fourth stage for the Americas, with Ethiopia's Feyisa Melese gaining a second on Britain's Dave Clarke. Abebe Mekonnen produced a strong final leg of 34:24 minutes to take the title for Ethiopia, gaining nearly 45 seconds on Karl Harrison who anchored Britain to second place.

In the women's race, Marty Cooksey established a lead of 23 seconds for the Americans on the first leg and her teammate Francie Larrieu Smith added a further 16 seconds in the second leg. Lisa Brady dropped nearly one minute for the United States on the third leg, letting New Zealand take the lead. Lyudmila Matveyeva won the stage to help Soviet Union re-enter the fray after a poor first leg. Her teammate Svetlana Guskova pushed the Soviets closer in the fifth leg, beating the field by over 20 seconds. Diane Brewer spoilt the American's chances on the fifth leg, dropping nearly a minute and a half to New Zealand's Anne Audain who won the stage to take pole position, while Soviet Union's Olga Bondarenko moved up to second place. The placings were sealed from thereon, with Anne Hare winning the sixth a last leg to leave New Zealand at the top of the podium. Runner-up Tatyana Samolenko helped the Soviet's to second place ahead of the United States.

== Medal summary ==
Event	Gold		Silver		Bronze	
Men's race	Ethiopia; Wodajo Bulti; Debebe Demisse; Bekele Debele; Feyisa Melese; Abebe Mekonnen	1:59:11	Great Britain; Carl Thackery; Jon Solly; Mark Scrutton; David Clarke; Karl Harrison	1:59:14	Oceania; Steve Moneghetti; David Burridge; Andrew Lloyd; Chris Tobin; Adam Hoyle	2:00:12
Women's race	New Zealand; Lorraine Moller; Hazel Stewart; Mary O'Connor; Sue Bruce; Anne Audain; Anne Hare	2:18:18	Soviet Union; Tatyana Kazankina; Marina Rodchenkova; Lyudmila Matveyeva; Svetlana Guskova; Olga Bondarenko; Tatyana Samolenko	2:18:33	United States; Marty Cooksey; Francie Larrieu Smith; Lisa Brady; Charly Haversat; Diane Brewer; Judy McCreery	2:19:11

== Stage winners ==
Stage	Distance	Men	Time	Women	Time
1	10 km	Carl Thackery (GBR)	28:14	Marty Cooksey (USA)	32:16
2	7 km	Jon Solly (GBR)	19:11	Francie Larrieu Smith (USA)	22:38
3	8 km	Takeyuki Nakayama (JPN)	22:32	Lyudmila Matveyeva (URS)	26:16
4	5 km	Mauricio González (MEX)	13:52	Svetlana Guskova (URS)	15:44
5	12.195 km/8 km	Abebe Mekonnen (ETH)	34:24	Anne Audain (NZL)	25:44
6	4.195 km	—		Anne Hare (NZL)	13:09

== Ekiden ==
=== Men's race ===
Rank	Team	Time
1	Ethiopia; Wodajo Bulti (28:17); Debebe Demisse (19:42); Bekele Debele (22:47); Feyisa Melese (14:01); Abebe Mekonnen (34:24)	1:59:11
2	Great Britain; Carl Thackery (28:14); Jon Solly (19:11); Mark Scrutton (22:39); David Clarke (14:02); Karl Harrison (35:08)	1:59:14
3	Oceania; Steve Moneghetti (28:27); David Burridge (19:51); Andrew Lloyd (22:36); Chris Tobin (13:53); Adam Hoyle (35:25)	2:00:12
4	Japan; Kozu Akutsu (29:18); Shuichi Yoneshige (19:39); Takeyuki Nakayama (22:32); Kunimitsu Itō (14:26); Kazuya Nishimoto (34:48)	2:00:43
5	Americas; Francisco Pacheco (28:38); Guillermo Serrano (20:24); Gerardo Alcalá (23:07); Mauricio González (13:52); Arturo Barrios (34:48)	2:00:49
6	Kenya; Some Muge; Joseph Kiptum; Boniface Merande; John Ngugi; Andrew Masai	2:02:01
7	Portugal; Paulo Catarino; António Leitão; Joaquim Pinheiro; Carlos Monteiro; Elisio Rios	2:02:23
8	Italy; Alessio Faustini; Franco Boffi; Gianni Truschi; Walter Merlo; Loris Pimazzoni	2:03:39
?	United States; Keith Brantly (29:11); Randy Reina (20:25); Bill Reifsnyder (23:14) ? Jon Sinclair (36:17)	?

=== Women's race ===
Rank	Team	Time
1	New Zealand; Lorraine Moller (32:39); Hazel Stewart; Mary O'Connor (26:53); Sue Bruce (16:31); Anne Audain (25:44); Anne Hare (13:09)	2:18:18
2	Soviet Union; Tatyana Kazankina (34:26); Marina Rodchenkova (23:04); Lyudmila Matveyeva (26:16); Svetlana Guskova (15:44); Olga Bondarenko (25:45); Tatyana Samolenko (13:18)	2:18:33
3	United States; Marty Cooksey (32:16); Francie Larrieu Smith (22:38); Lisa Brady (27:14); Charly Haversat (16:13); Diane Brewer (27:13); Judy McCreery (13:37)	2:19:11
4	United Kingdom; Paula Fudge (33:09); Carol Greenwood (24:12); Susan Crehan (26:28); Melissa Watson (16:10); Shireen Barbour (26:31); Philippa Mason (14:01)	2:20:31
