= Hannah Nuttall =

British athlete (born 1997)

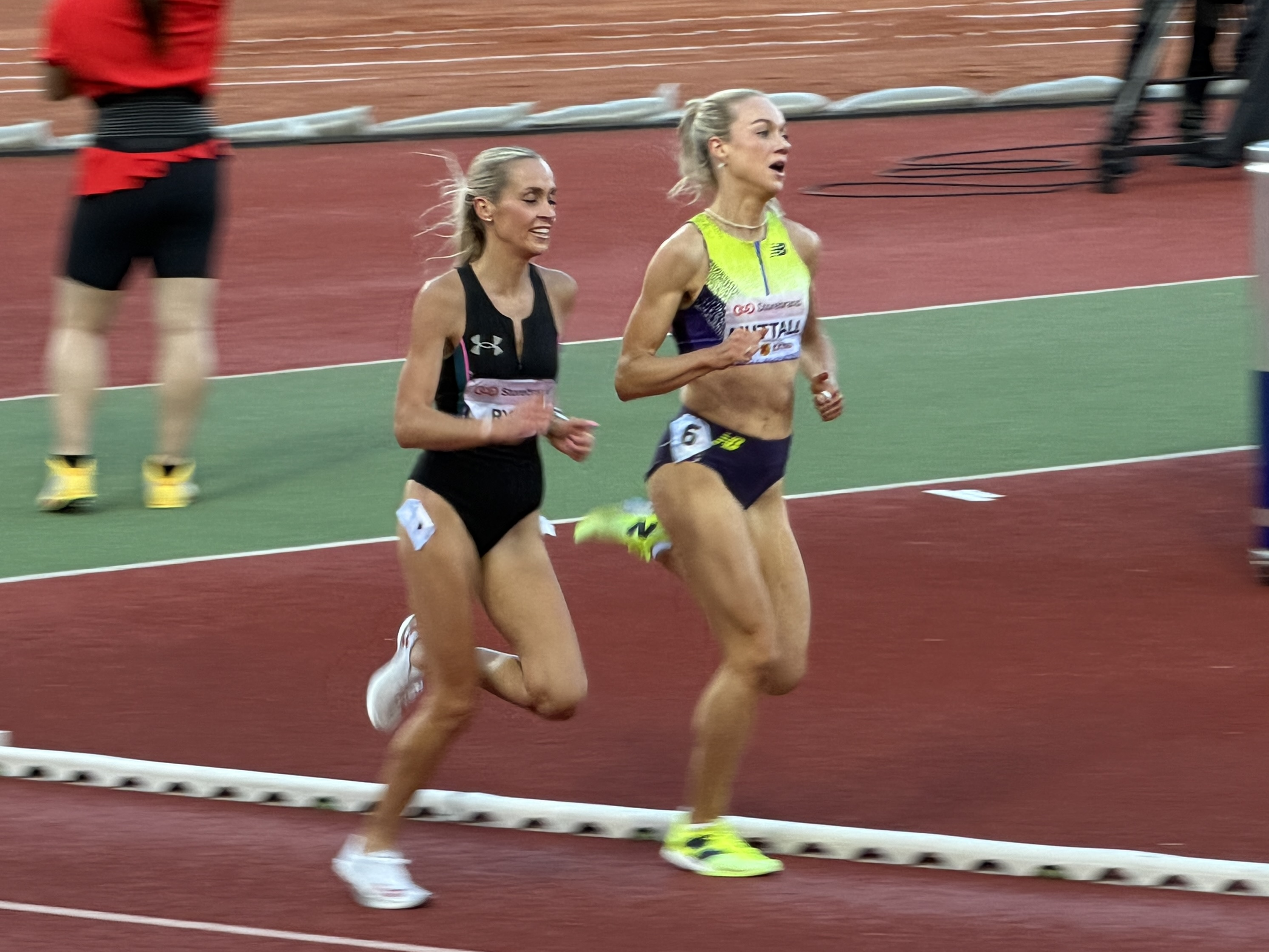
- Nuttall at the 2026 Bislett Games

Personal information
- Nationality: British
- Born: 7 July 1997 (age 29) Preston, Lancashire, England

Sport
- Sport: Athletics
- Event: long-distance
- Club: Charnwood AC
Medal record
Women's athletics
Representing Great Britain
European Cross Country Championships
Gold medal – first place	2021 Dublin	Mixed relay
European Games
Bronze medal – third place	2023 Kraków-Małopolska	5000 m

Hannah Nuttall (born 7 July 1997) is a British athlete. She competes in middle-distance and cross-country running events. In 2024, 2025 and 2026, she was the British champion in the 5000 metres. In 2025 and 2026 Nuttall was British indoor champion over 3000 metres.

== Early life ==
Nuttall was born in Preston, Lancashire. She ran as a youngster for Charnwood Athletics club. Nuttall attended Loughborough College and had her first experience of representing Britain at the 2015 junior World Cross Country Championships held in Guiyang, China. A qualified nutritionist, she attended the University of New Mexico, and completed a master's degree at Loughborough University.

== Career ==
In 2021 she won the mixed relay at the 2021 European Cross Country Championships held in Dublin. Shortly afterwards she began to be coached by Helen Clitheroe when she joined Team New Balance Manchester.

=== 2023 ===
In February 2023, Nuttall finished runner-up at the British national indoors championships over 3000m. She was subsequently selected for the Great Britain squad for the 2023 European Indoor Championships held in Istanbul for the 3000m. She qualified for the final in the 3000m. Nuttall ran a personal best time of 8:46.30 as she achieved a fifth-placed finish in the final.

She was selected for the British team for the 2023 European Athletics Team Championships held in Chorzów, Silesia, Poland between 20 and 25 June 2023. It was the second time she had ever ran a 5000m race on the track, and she finished in second position overall in the First Division race, with a time of 15:29:49.

=== 2024 ===
In February 2024 in Boston, Massachusetts, she ran a new personal best over 3000 metres, running 8:45.61. The following week she lowered her 5000m personal best to 15:03.39 in Boston. She finished second at the 2024 British Indoor Athletics Championships in Birmingham over 3000 metres. She was subsequently selected for the 2024 World Athletics Indoor Championships in Glasgow where she competed in the women's 3000 metres in which she finished twelfth in the final.

She set a new outdoors personal best over 5000m running 14:57.91 at the Los Angeles Grand Prix on 17 May 2024. The following weekend she lowered that again in Leiden, in the Netherlands, to 14:52.65. She was selected to run the 5000 metres for Britain at the 2024 European Athletics Championships in Rome. In 2024, she became British national 5000m champion in the 5000 metres at the 2024 British Athletics Championships in Manchester.

=== 2025 ===
She set a new 3000m personal best of 8:40.01 at the New Balance Indoor Grand Prix on 2 February 2025. She won the 3000 metres at the 2025 British Indoor Athletics Championships in Birmingham on 23 February 2025. She was selected for the British team for the 2025 European Athletics Indoor Championships in Apeldoorn, where she qualified for the final of the 3000 metres.

She ran a 3000 metres personal best of 8:33.82 at the 2025 BAUHAUS-galan event in Stockholm, part of the 2025 Diamond League. She ran a personal best of 14:39.48 in the 5000m at the 2025 London Athletics Meet. On 2 August 2025, she retained her 5000m title at the 2025 UK Athletics Championships in Birmingham Nuttall was eighth in 8:44.74 over 3000 metres at the Diamond League Final in Zurich on 28 August. In September 2025, she was a finalist over 5000 metres at the 2025 World Championships in Tokyo, Japan, placing eighth overall.

Nuttal was runner-up at the Manchester Road Race, Connecticut, on 27 November 2025, finishing behind Weini Kelati.

=== 2026 ===
On 24 January 2026, Nuttall ran 3000 metres in an indoor personal best of 8:38.96 at the New Balance Indoor Grand Prix in Boston. On 1 February, Nuttall ran a lifetime best to finish second at the Millrose Games in New York, running the 3000m in 8:32.94 to finish behind Kenya’s Doris Lemngole. On 15 February, Nuttall broke Jo Pavey's championship record by almost two seconds to win the 3000 metres title at the 2026 British Indoor Athletics Championships in Birmingham, in 8:41.76. Nuttal placed ninth over 3000 metres at the 2026 World Athletics Indoor Championships in Toruń, Poland, in March 2026.

On 20 June, Nuttall ran 15:15.03 to win the 5000 metres title at the 2026 UK Athletics Championships. Competing at the 2026 London Athletics Meet on 18 July, Nuttall ran a 3000 metres personal best to finish in fourth with 8:26.48. Nuttall was selected to represent England at the 2026 Commonwealth Games in Glasgow, placing fifth in the 5000 metres in 14:51.34. On 11 August, Nuttall was fifth in 15:41.27 in the 5000 metres race at the 2026 European Athletics Championships in Birmingham. In September, she placed eleventh over 5000 m at the inaugural World Ultimate Championship in Budapest. Competing in the 5k at the 2026 World Athletics Road Running Championships in Copenhagen on 19 September, she finished tenth in a personal best 15:08.

== Results and personal bests ==
All results taken from World Athletics profile

Championship results

Year	Meet	Venue	Event	Place	Time
2024	World Indoor Championships	Birmingham Arena	3000m	12th	8:48.24
2024	British Indoor Championships	Birmingham Arena	3000m	2nd	9:01.94
2023	European Athletics Indoor Championships	Ataköy Arena	3000m	5th	8:46.30
2023	British Indoor Championships	Birmingham Arena	3000m	2nd	8:50.85
2023	European Athletics Team Championships	Stadion Śląski	5000m	3rd	15:29.49
2022	British Athletics Championships	Manchester Regional Arena	1500m	4th	4:20.25
2021	European Cross Country Championships	National Sports Campus	XC Mixed Relay	1st	18:01
2020	British Athletics Championships	Manchester Regional Arena	Steeplechase	3rd	10:25.43
2019	European Cross Country Championships	Lisbon, Portugal	XC U23	31st	22:28
2017	British Athletics Championships	Alexander Stadium	1500m	H1 6th	4:19.39
2015	British Indoor Championships	EIS, Sheffield	3000m	8th	9:28.82
2015	World XC Championships	Guiyang, China	XC U20	45th	22:23

Personal bests

Surface	Event	Time	Date	Venue
Indoor track	3000m	8:32.94	1 February 2026	New York
Indoor track	5000m	15:03.39	9 February 2024	Boston University
Outdoor track	1500m	4:05.66	4 June 2023	Hengelo, NED
Outdoor track	One mile	4:33.42	2 July 2022	Morton Stadium
Outdoor track	3000m	8:26.48	18 July 2026	London, England
Outdoor track	5000m	14:39.48	19 July 2025	London, England
Outdoor track	Steeplechase	10:25.43	9 September 2017	Manchester, GBR

== Personal life ==
Nuttall is the daughter of former athletes Alison Wyeth and John Nuttall. Her brother Luke Nuttall is also an athlete, as is her stepsister Eilish McColgan.
