= Death of Cindy James =

1989 death in British Columbia, Canada

Coordinates: 49.154980°N 123.134730°W

- James in 1981
- Born: Cynthia Elizabeth Hack; June 12, 1944; Oliver, British Columbia, Canada
- Disappeared: May 25, 1989 (aged 44); Richmond, British Columbia, Canada
- Died: c. June 2–June 8, 1989 (aged 44); Richmond, British Columbia, Canada
- Cause of death: Combined drug intoxication of undetermined factors
- Body discovered: June 8, 1989; Richmond, British Columbia, Canada
- Other name: Cynthia Makepeace
- Spouse: Roy Makepeace (m. 1966; div. 1982)

Cynthia Elizabeth James (née Hack; June 12, 1944 – c. June 2—June 8, 1989) (Note: James's exact date of death is unknown, though a forensic entomologist who examined her body concluded she had likely died as early as June 2, 1989.) was a Canadian nurse who disappeared from Richmond, British Columbia, on May 25, 1989. She was found deceased approximately two weeks later in the yard of an abandoned house, hogtied and with a nylon stocking wrapped around her throat. An autopsy indicated that she had died of an overdose of morphine, diazepam, and flurazepam. James's death was notable as she had made numerous reports to authorities dating back to 1982, alleging that she had been a victim of various acts of stalking, harassment, vandalism, home invasions, and physical attacks perpetrated by an unknown assailant.

James's death and prior allegations were subject of great dispute, as the Royal Canadian Mounted Police (RCMP) were unable to find any evidence suggesting she had been an actual victim of a stalker. Furthermore, she had a documented medical history of depression and suicidal thoughts, leading authorities to suspect that she may have been fabricating the various attacks and other incidents herself, orchestrating them to appear as legitimate, culminating in an eventual staged suicide. Over the nearly seven-year period James reported the incidents, the RCMP allocated an estimated $1–1.5 million in funds to investigate her claims, marking one of the longest and most costly police investigations in British Columbia history.

Despite skepticism from authorities, James's family members publicly insisted that she had in fact been preyed upon, and eventually murdered. A coroner's inquest was held in the spring of 1990 which included testimony from more than 80 witnesses. The inquest ultimately resulted in the conclusion that James had died of an "unknown event." (Note: While her autopsy noted that James's immediate cause of death was a multiple-drug overdose, the coroner's inquest concluded she died as a result of an "unknown event.")

James's death received international media coverage and was the subject of an Unsolved Mysteries segment in 1991. Furthermore, two different books were published in 1991 chronicling her life and death: Who Killed Cindy James by British journalist Ian Mulgrew, and The Deaths of Cindy James by Neal Hall, a Canadian crime reporter who had extensively covered James's case for the Vancouver Sun. In 2021, a podcast on James, Death by Unknown Event, narrated by Pamela Adlon, was released by Audible.

== Background ==
Cynthia Elizabeth Hack was born in Oliver, British Columbia, Canada, on June 12, 1944, to Matilda "Tilley", a homemaker, and Otto Hack, an English teacher and former colonel in the Royal Canadian Air Force. Both of her parents were of Russian descent. She was one of six children, with three older brothers and two younger sisters. Cindy spent part of her teenage years in Ottawa due to her father's involvement in the air force, and attended high school there. She recorded in her private diaries that her childhood had been marked by her father's strictness, which included corporal punishment.

In adulthood, Cindy pursued a nursing career in Vancouver, and enrolled in nursing school in 1962. During this period, her father had reenlisted with the air force and relocated the family to France, where she visited them during holidays. During this time, in letters to her family, Cindy occasionally referred to an unnamed intern she had met during her studies. She claimed that the two had at one point been engaged, and that, after finding he had terminal cancer, the man died by suicide while the couple were on a skiing trip. None of her parents or siblings, however, ever met the man, and Cindy did not name him.

In the summer of 1965, Cindy met Roy Makepeace, a South African psychiatrist 18 years her senior. The two married on December 9, 1966, the same year she graduated from nursing school with a BSN. Cindy's parents were skeptical of the marriage due to the couple's age difference, and her father felt that Makepeace had taken advantage of Cindy's "naiveté and gullibility." Her family testified that the couple's marriage was troubled and that the two were at times emotionally distant. Cindy later made accusations of spousal abuse; Makepeace claimed he "only slapped her twice" over the course of their marriage. Though licensed as a psychiatrist in his home country of South Africa, Makepeace failed twice to obtain his medical license in Canada and instead accepted a job as an Assistant Professor in the Faculty of Medicine at the University of British Columbia.

Cindy worked as a pediatric nurse at Vancouver General Hospital—where her husband had also one time been employed—from 1966 to 1975. In 1973, Makepeace took a job as director of health services at BC Hydro. In April 1975, Cindy was hired as a team coordinator at Vancouver's Blenheim House, a facility caring for children with behavioral disorders. She worked at Blenheim House for approximately 12 years, and was noted by her colleagues for her competence and professionalism.

== Allegations of harassment ==
Spanning a nearly seven year-period between 1982 and 1989, Cindy reported approximately 90 incidents of criminal activity to the Royal Canadian Mounted Police (RCMP). Her claims included alleged acts of stalking, vandalism, arson, harassment, intimidation, home invasions, and physical assaults perpetrated by an unknown person or persons.

=== 1982 ===
The incidents began in September 1982, four months after Cindy separated from Makepeace. In late September, she told friends and family members she suspected that a prowler had been lurking around her home. A series of obscene phone calls soon followed, the first of which was received on October 7, 1982. Cindy's mother relayed that, though she was reluctant to discuss her experiences, she indicated that the phone calls consisted of an individual speaking in different voices, and that, on some occasions, there was mere silence on the other end of the line. Cindy described some of the calls as sexual and violent in nature.

On October 11, Cindy received a phone call consisting of loud breathing noises; the following day, she received another call in a menacing whisper, which said: "I'll get you one night, Cindy." She reported the obscene calls to the RCMP, who visited her home and suggested she keep a list of each call and its contents, as well as get an unlisted number. Shortly after the officer left, Cindy received a call in which an apparent male voice said: "You fucking bitch. I'll get you." The next day, on the afternoon of October 13, the caller threatened her: "So you think calling the police will keep you safe? You wait. I've got my zipper open, I'm talking to my throbbing..." before she abruptly ended the call.

Two days later, Cindy reported to the RCMP that she had heard someone lurking outside her home and awoken in the morning to find her porch lights smashed. On October 15, she reported to police that someone had thrown a rock through one of her windows and entered her house, though nothing else had been disturbed. Four days later, on October 19, she reported that someone had entered her home and slashed a pillow on her bed.

Patrick McBride, a constable with the Vancouver RCMP, suspected the culprit was her estranged husband, Makepeace, who denied involvement. Cindy herself made conflicting statements regarding Makepeace, telling authorities she did not think he was capable of tormenting her, but also divulged to friends and coworkers that he was violently abusive during their marriage. On October 20, two tenants who rented the basement of Cindy's home reported to police that they heard strange noises upstairs on the main floor after she had left for work. A next-door neighbor informed McBride that she had witnessed a man standing outside the house on at least three different occasions, and one time entering the gate of the front yard. The neighbor insisted the man did not resemble Makepeace.

Cindy concurrently began a relationship with McBride, which lasted approximately one year. McBride, who had recently separated from his wife, moved into Cindy's house on October 31, 1982. She told friends that McBride had offered to stay for approximately two weeks, helping surveil in the event that the perpetrator arrived at her home. Several days after McBride moved in, he found Makepeace sitting in his parked car in an alley behind the house. When questioned, Makepeace claimed he was trying to catch Cindy's alleged intruder "in the act," and subsequently left after McBride informed him he had moved in.

In mid-November, McBride stated that he himself received a mysterious phone call at the home while Cindy was present, and that the caller spoke no words. McBride initially suspected the call may have been made from an airport terminal, as he could hear a woman's voice in the background over a public-address system, though it was eventually traced to an exchange in the Vancouver suburb of Richmond. Later in November, Cindy found a note pinned to her car windshield which featured a picture of a corpse lying under a medical sheet. On November 28, McBride observed that the phone lines outside the house had been cut in five different places. Cindy, who remained cordial and friendly with Makepeace despite their breakup, at times invited him to her home with McBride present, as both men had in common a shared fascination with finding her alleged harasser, and would often discuss the case together. McBride moved out of Cindy's home on December 1, though the two continued to casually date, frequently having dinners together in Vancouver and Bellingham, Washington, United States. The week of Christmas 1982, Cindy found a note outside her house reading "Merry Christmas," with a photo of a woman with her throat slashed, stained with red ink.

=== 1983–1984 ===
On the night of January 27, 1983, Agnes Woodcock, a friend and coworker from Blenheim House, visited Cindy's house and found her lying unconscious in her backyard, with a nylon stocking wrapped around her neck. Upon regaining consciousness, Cindy told Woodcock that she had been attacked from behind by an assailant while walking to her exterior garage, and that the individual brought her into the garage, where another male subject waited, and the two strangled her. She alleged that the men inserted a knife into her vagina and threatened to kill her younger sister, Melanie, if she reported the attack to authorities. Doctors who examined Cindy after the alleged attack found no concrete evidence of sexual assault, though Det. David Boywer-Smith remained ambivalent about her claim. At police request, Cindy was asked to see a psychiatrist but declined, as she feared doing so would stigmatize her; instead, she agreed to visit a general practitioner with experience in counseling.

An undated note received by James from her alleged stalker, featuring a collage of disturbing images

Cindy relocated from her residence to a house in West Vancouver on February 1, 1983. Less than a week later, she received a threatening letter reading: "Run Rabbit Run, I'll show you how fucking good I am. Soon, bang, bang, you're dead." After a rash of further obscene calls, Cindy relocated again to another house in April 1983. Makepeace, who had made continued attempts to reconcile with his wife, showered her with several lavish gifts in the summer of 1983 and paid her airfare to Indonesia so she could visit her brother, Roger, who was stationed there. Several weeks after returning from the trip, Cindy found another note on August 22, which read: "Welcome back—death, blood, hate, etc."

Cindy painted her car a different color in an attempt to conceal her identity, and hired a private investigator, Ozzie Kaban, to help investigate her alleged stalker. She continued to pay for Kaban's services over the following six years. Kaban noted that Cindy went to extensive lengths to protect herself, such as wearing a portable panic button and keeping oil and pepper spray with her at all times. Between October and November 1983, Cindy discovered the remains of three strangled cats in her garden, each bound with rope. In her private diary, she accused Makepeace of destroying the garden in her backyard. She continued to receive numerous phone calls at home and at work, some of which were answered by her coworkers at Blenheim House, who told authorities the caller did not speak.

Facial composite of the assailant James claimed attacked her on January 30, 1984

On January 30, 1984, Kaban overheard strange noises on a two-way radio he had given Cindy, prompting him to visit her home. Upon arrival, he found her lying unconscious on her living room floor with a paring knife stabbed through her hand, and a note pinned through with the knife. The note, which had letters cut-and-pasted from a magazine, read: "NOW YOU MUST DIE, CUNT." Cindy was taken to a local hospital, and in an interview with Kaban stated the last thing she remembered was witnessing a man come through the gate to her property before he assaulted her and bludgeoned her over the head with a blunt object. She stated that, once incapacitated, she recalled her attacker inserting a hypodermic needle into her arm. Doctors located a needle mark in her right arm, but found no traces of any drugs in her system. Cindy took a polygraph test after the incident, which purportedly showed no deception; however, the officer who conducted the test later stated that the results, by his estimation, proved "inconclusive." Constable Kiyo Ikoma, who reported to Cindy's residence the night of the alleged attack, stated that he observed blood smeared in circular patterns on the kitchen floor, as though someone had attempted to clean evidence.

In February 1984, detectives began increasingly questioning Makepeace, as Cindy had confided that she felt he was the one tormenting her. In interviews, Makepeace theorized that Cindy's attackers were part of the mafia and connected to her employment at Blenheim House, which often treated children who were wards of the court. In March 1984, Cindy's father Otto met with Makepeace at a doughnut shop in Vancouver wearing a police wiretap, and told Makepeace to cease contact with his daughter. After the meeting, Makepeace wrote and sent a six-page letter to Otto outlining his theory that he believed the mafia was after Cindy, and urged Otto to pressure police to investigate this angle.

Over the summer of 1984, Cindy's reported incidents of harassment reached a "crescendo" in intensity. On June 18, she phoned Kaban in a panic, and he rushed to her home to find her cowering in the garden, claiming someone had infiltrated the house. Kaban discovered her dog, Heidi, cowering in the basement, along with a note reading "Happy Birthday" alongside sexually-explicit photos. Heidi had been physically abused, and Kaban noted that the rope bound around her appeared to be the same discovered on the dead cats Cindy had found the previous autumn. On a windowsill in the basement, a cigarette butt was discovered which did not match the brand Cindy was known to smoke. Based on the physical abuse Heidi had endured, Kaban concluded that Cindy could not have been the perpetrator, stating: "She'd never have done that if she was the Cindy I knew." Over the following several weeks, further calls were received, one of which Kaban answered at Cindy's home while she was at work, and a dead cat was found lying in the stairwell of her house. On July 1, Cindy told Kaban two men had arrived at her front door posing as police officers, but fled when she radioed Kaban. Cindy subsequently reported a series of further obscene calls, one of which consisted of the caller saying: "You're dead, bitch. It's gonna feel good." A coworker of Cindy at Blenheim House also received a call which said: "Get rid of the big pig."

On July 9, 1984, Cindy's mother Tilley spent the night at her home. In the middle of the night, Tilley awoke to Heidi barking, and found Cindy checking windows and doors on the main floor of the house. Moments later, they both heard the doorbell ring, and discovered a window near the front porch cracked in several areas. Two weeks later, on July 23, Cindy claimed she was attacked by an assailant in nearby Dunbar Park while walking her dog at approximately 8:30 p.m. By her recollection, she was assailed by a bearded man driving a green van, with a female passenger. Several hours later, at around midnight, she was found in a dazed state attempting to enter the home of a neighbor, and had a dark-grey nylon stocking around her neck. Her dog Heidi was found by Kaban wandering in the area of the park. She was taken to the nearby University of British Columbia Health and Sciences Centre, where doctors observed two puncture marks in her right arm. While Cindy was being treated, a hospital receptionist told authorities a man with an accent had called the front desk inquiring about the hospital's security policies; when police played audio of Makepeace's voice, the receptionist felt there was a "strong possibility" it was the same person. In October 1984, while under the care of a hypnotherapist, Cindy recounted a repressed memory of witnessing a double murder but did not divulge further details.

=== 1985–1986 ===
Following the July 1984 attack, Cindy continued to receive anonymous phone calls, but none were long enough to be adequately traced by police, and police surveillance of her home proved unfruitful. In January 1985, while under hypnosis, Cindy told police she had witnessed her ex-husband murder a man and woman, then dismember their bodies with an axe while the couple were vacationing at a cabin on Thormanby Island, near Sechelt, in July 1981. According to Cindy, Makepeace smeared blood from one of the victims' severed limbs across her face during the dismemberment. It was later discovered that Cindy's sister, Melanie, was with her on this vacation, and had no recollection of anything sinister occurring.

In late June 1985, Cindy was involuntarily committed to the psychiatric unit at Vancouver's Lions Gate Hospital after having attempted suicide by overdosing on prescription drugs, though she later said she had not intended to kill herself. On July 2, she agreed to allow police to wiretap a phone conversation with Makepeace, during which she accused him of being the source of her problems, and confronted him about the memory she recounted under hypnosis of him murdering two people. During the conversation, Makepeace denied the incidents, deeming Cindy "insane" and involved in an "enormous" revenge fantasy. Following this recorded call, the RCMP employed officers to maintain 24-hour surveillance of Cindy, Makepeace, and two other unnamed suspects over a weeklong period. The surveillance was ultimately terminated after nothing unusual was observed. Authorities further investigated Cindy's claims regarding the alleged dismemberments committed by Makepeace and found no evidence of any murders or missing person cases in the Gulf Islands at the time. Makepeace's attorney stated that the accusation led authorities on a "wild goose chase" searching for the cabin location of the alleged murders, which they were unable to find.

Cindy received a package at her home in early July containing a charcoal-colored nylon stocking, along with a note reading: "Blood flowing freely." Several weeks later, on July 27, she found a cosmetics container on her front porch containing putrefied raw meat from a small animal. On August 5, Cindy called into the police station reporting a fire in her home. Authorities found what appeared to be pieces of burnt newspaper scattered in the room; another fire was reported by Cindy the following day.

On August 21, a third fire broke out in the basement bathroom of Cindy's home at approximately 4:45 a.m. When firefighters and police arrived at the residence, they observed Cindy in a "heated" discussion with private investigator Kaban, explaining that she had taken her dog out for a walk at approximately 3:15 am and returned home to discover the blaze. The window of the bathroom was found partly ajar by authorities, but the soot and dust on the windowsill showed no markings that an intruder had entered or exited through it. Charred remnants of a newspaper were discovered in the bathroom. A detective who investigated the fire later testified that he believed Cindy had started the blaze herself.

"This woman was under siege from whatever source—inside or out... She was in a living nightmare."

— Dr. Anthony Marcus, a psychologist who interviewed James in 1985

In the fall of 1985, Dr. Anthony Marcus, a psychologist, was requested by Carol Halliday of the RCMP to conduct interviews with Cindy and examine the various case files. Halliday, who had become involved with the case after reporting with a colleague at the August 21 fire incident, felt Cindy was lying and orchestrating her attacks, and that the various male officers who investigated them for her had been "conned by the histrionics of a pretty woman." Based on his interviews and analysis of police records, Marcus offered his professional opinion that Cindy may have been suffering from dissociative identity disorder stemming from a traumatic childhood incident, though he did not question Cindy about her early life during their interviews.

On December 1, Cindy relocated to a new house in Richmond. Ten days later, on December 11, at approximately 6:00 p.m., she was found by motorists semiconscious in a ditch approximately 6 kilometres (3.7 mi) from her home, near the University of British Columbia campus. She was wearing men's work boots and a single glove, and again, a nylon stocking was tightly tied around her neck. Due to frigid temperatures, Cindy was suffering from hypothermia and was rushed to a local hospital, where it was suspected she had been injected with some sort of tranquilizer. She also exhibited bruising and various cuts on her body. When interviewed in the hospital, Cindy claimed to have no memory of what occurred, or how she had gotten to the location where she had been found; her last memory was going to have lunch during her workday, after which she stopped at a local pharmacy. Disconsolate over the feeling that police did not believe her, she flew to visit her brother Roger in West Germany for Christmas.

In early 1986, Cindy formally changed her last name from Makepeace, the surname of her ex-husband, to James, hoping to further conceal her identity. To help assuage her fears, her friend Agnes Woodcock and the latter's husband Tom sometimes spent nights at Cindy's home. On April 16, the couple were awoken by Cindy, who stated she heard a commotion in the house. Upon investigating, they found another fire had been started in the basement. When they attempted to phone the fire department, they found the phone was dead. Tom fled across the street to a neighbor's residence to call police, and when exiting the house, claimed to have witnessed a man standing on the street outside the residence; when Tom approached him, the subject fled on foot.

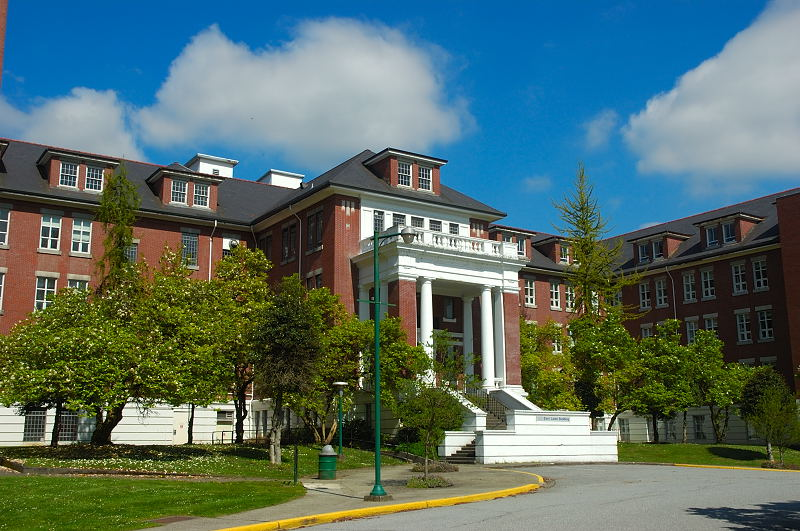
Riverview Hospital, where James was admitted for numerous weeks between April–May 1986

Cindy stayed with the Woodcocks for several days following the fire, where they noted that she refused to eat and made comments that her life was no longer worth living. Allan Connolly, a psychiatrist who had been treating Cindy since January 1983, met with her and stated that, though he had long believed her allegations of harassment, he feared she was suicidal. Connolly had her committed to the psychiatric ward of St. Paul's Hospital for two weeks, where it was observed that she was suffering from anorexia and depression. She was subsequently transferred to Riverview Hospital, where a comprehensive psychological examination was conducted. The report noted:

This 41-year-old woman on initial assessment was very resistant. She would only answer in one-word responses. She refused to discuss a number of topics and would give no eye contact. On the second date her mood was considerably elevated. She had completed the other tests herself and was willing to talk. She seemed apprehensive as to how the tests could be used. She maintained good eye contact except when discussing the terrorizing incidents[;] she then would look down or cover her eyes and speak haltingly. She expressed upset and cried a great deal when relating these incidents [...] Patient kept asking if her responses to the items indicated she was crazy [...] Her IQ [is] well above average. This type of individual can be characterized as negativistic and conforming. They have unpredictable moods, pessimism, sullenness vacillating with social agreement and friendliness. They tend to anticipate and precipitate disappointments through their obstructive and negative behaviour [...] This type of person tends to be vulnerable to fears.

After a ten-week hospital stay, Cindy was released. According to her father, she told him she had been "withholding information" regarding her alleged attacks, stating that she knew the identity of the assailant but refused to name him.

=== 1987–1989 ===
In August 1987, Cindy began working as a nurse at Richmond General Hospital. On August 28, her home alarm was triggered after a back window was broken, and three days later, on August 31, she reported to police that her front porch lightbulbs had been loosened. The following week, she reported that someone had used a glass cutter to create a hole in the basement door window. In February 1988, Cindy indicated that someone had shattered a window to her home after securing it with electrical tape.

On October 11, 1988, Makepeace received two strange voice messages on his home answering machine. One of the messages contained a hoarse voice speaking the phrase: "Cindy, dead meat soon," while the other stated: "More smack, more downers, another grand after we waste the cunt. No more deal." He gave the answering machine tapes to his attorney, as he distrusted the Vancouver police, whom he felt might target him as a suspect. Fifteen days later, Cindy was found unconscious in her garage. She had been hogtied, was nude from the waist down, and again had a black nylon stocking tied around her neck. Around this time, the RCMP hired mountain climber and knot expert Robert Chisnall to analyze the knots on the nylon stockings she had frequently been found bound with. At the time, Chisnall concluded that it was "highly unlikely" that Cindy would have been able to secure such knots herself.

In January 1989, Richard Johnston, a life insurance salesman from whom Cindy had purchased a policy, moved into the basement unit of her residence; she offered him the rental on the basis that she would feel more safe with someone else living with her. On April 8, a security guard at Richmond General Hospital, where Cindy was employed, discovered a note on the premises with cut-and-pasted letters, which read: "SOON, CINDY". The phrase "sleep well" was also found written in the dew on her windshield. Following a reported attempted break-in at her home on April 29, the RCMP used scent hounds in an attempt to track the alleged intruder, but the dogs found no trail. On May 10, 1989, scent hounds were utilized again following another alleged break-in, and were able to track the scent of an unknown individual that led over the backyard fence of Cindy's home.

=== RCMP conclusions ===
Over the course of the nearly seven years that Cindy had reported the various incidents, the RCMP spent an estimated CA$1–1.5 million worth of resources investigating her claims, but no evidence could be located to corroborate them. Because of this, authorities suspected that Cindy was inventing the incidents herself, and staging them to appear as though she were the victim of a violent stalker. Cindy expressed frustration with the police department, aside from one detective, Jerry Anderson. In a complaint she filed against the RCMP for her perceived dismissal by several officers, she positively singled out Anderson "for his patience, unfailing professional conduct and his exemplary investigation of this case... He is the only member of the RCMP I feel I can trust and be comfortable with."

== Disappearance ==
At approximately 4 p.m. on May 25, 1989, Cindy picked up her paycheck from Richmond General Hospital. There, she spoke with a coworker, who reported that she seemed to be in good spirits, and said Cindy informed her she had not experienced any suspicious activity at her home for at least two weeks. Cindy was last seen several hours later purchasing groceries at a Safeway supermarket and visiting a Bank of Montreal at the Blundell Shopping Centre. A bank patron told police they had stood in line behind Cindy at the bank's ATM, where she deposited her paycheck at approximately 7:59 p.m.

That same day, Cindy had scheduled to have an infrared detection system installed in her home for security purposes, and had planned for her friends Agnes and Tom Woodcock to play bridge and spend the night. After not hearing from Cindy, the Woodcocks visited her home at approximately 10:00 p.m., and found the house locked and Cindy's Chevrolet Citation absent. They briefly spoke with Johnston, who informed them she had mentioned earlier that she was going to do some shopping. The Woodcocks drove past the Blundell Shopping Centre which they knew Cindy to frequent and found her car abandoned in the lot. They proceeded to drive to the Richmond RCMP station to report Cindy as a missing person. Though she had only been missing for several hours, a patrol car was sent to investigate based on her extensive history with the police department.

Upon examination of the vehicle, blood was located inside the car on the driver's side door as well as groceries and a wrapped birthday gift for her friend's young son; contents from Cindy's wallet were found lying underneath the vehicle. A subsequent inspection of her home that night showed nothing had been disturbed: police observed that the house was orderly and clean, and filled with numerous "well-tended" houseplants. The Canadian Coast Guard deployed searches of rivers in the area, as well as the Gulf of Georgia, in an attempt to locate the missing woman.

Several days after Cindy was reported missing, her tenant, Johnston informed police he had received a call at his office from a man claiming to be her father, inquiring about her life insurance policy. Johnston's secretary informed the caller that he would need to visit the office, as private insurance matters could not be relayed over the phone. When authorities questioned Cindy's father, he denied ever making the phone call.

== Death ==
On June 8, 1989, Gordon Starchuck, a municipal paving worker, discovered Cindy's body in the backyard of an abandoned house at 8111 Blundell Road, Richmond. Her body was hogtied with rope behind her back, and a black nylon stocking was bound tightly around her neck. Cindy's right leg lay beneath a bramble of blackberry bushes, and her coat was found lying near her body. The property where her remains were found was situated along a busy street near an intersection, which had frequent foot traffic from pedestrians. On the residence's exterior fuel tank, police found a graffito in orange spray paint reading: "Some bitch died here." A line, spray-painted along the ground with the same orange paint, ran from the fuel tank to the spot where her body lay, encircling it. Inside the abandoned home, another spray-painted graffito reading "Devil" was found.

Sheila Carlyle, a pathologist who examined Cindy's body at the scene, noted that her hands had been bound so tightly that one finger had scratched another down to the bone. A pinprick consistent with a hypodermic needle was located on the inner-right elbow of the body. Based on insect and larvae activity on the remains, forensic entomologist Gail Anderson concluded that the body had begun the decomposition process at the site where it was found as early as June 2, 1989.

An autopsy determined that Cindy had died of multiple drug intoxication from substantial amounts of morphine, diazepam, and flurazepam. Her blood toxicology report showed that she had ten times the lethal dose of morphine in her bloodstream. Based on an examination of her stomach contents, toxicologist Heather Dinn reported that Cindy had orally ingested approximately twenty 30-milligram tablets of flurazepam (or up to eighty tablets of a lower dose), in addition to numerous tablets of diazepam, a combination that itself was lethal. The method by which the morphine had been administered could not be determined, "baffling" the pharmacologist who analyzed the toxicology report. Traces of morphine were found in Cindy's stomach, though Dr. John McNeill stated that the amount could have resulted from intravenous injection of the drug. By McNeill's analysis, if Cindy had received the morphine via intravenous injection, she would have been rendered unconscious within mere minutes, and would have died within several hours. It was ultimately concluded by authorities that the overdose had been "so large that there was no reliable estimate of how long Cindy could have remained functional."

The RCMP suspected Cindy's cause of death was likely a suicide or accident, based on the assumption that she had fabricated her numerous prior claims of assaults and stalking, and this was quickly reported by several local tabloid news outlets. Her personal private investigator, Kaban, visited the morgue to examine her body on June 10 and observed that her remains exhibited lividity—the settling of blood postmortem, visible on the skin—on the left side of her body. Because her body had been found lying on its right side, Kaban felt that she may have died elsewhere, and that her body was relocated to the site where it was ultimately discovered.

A memorial service was held for Cindy on June 14, 1989, two days after what would have been her forty-fifth birthday. Police surveilled the memorial service using hidden cameras, capturing the faces and license plates of all who attended. Her ex-husband, Makepeace, was not in attendance. In the summer of 1989, the abandoned house where Cindy's body was discovered was demolished.

=== Coroner's inquest ===
An extensive inquest into Cindy's death was undertaken in the spring of 1990 in Burnaby, which consisted of five jurors and featured testimony from over eighty witnesses. The inquest was originally scheduled to run three weeks, but upon it "progressing much slower than expected," an additional twenty-one days were added. The inquest, which totaled forty days, was the longest and most expensive in British Columbia at that time.

Among the evidence presented were the two recorded phone messages Makepeace had received on his answering machine. During his testimony on the stand, Makepeace made various accusations against Cindy's family, alleging that her father had physically abused her throughout her childhood and that one of her brothers had molested her. He also accused the police of attempting to frame him. It was also revealed that, shortly after her death, Cindy's parents uncovered a hoard of various medications in her home (including sedatives and antipsychotic drugs) prescribed by her psychiatrists, which they disposed of by flushing down the toilet. Her younger sister, Melanie, also found a glass cutter in Cindy's purse along with a medical syringe kit, a urinary catheter, and saline solution in her bedroom.

Jurors were presented with graphic footage of Cindy's decomposing corpse as it was discovered at the scene, as well as numerous accounts detailing her mental state leading up to her death. Testimony was provided from several psychiatrists and psychologists, including those who had personally treated Cindy over the years. Dr. Paul Termansen testified that he believed she suffered from hysterical personality disorder, while Dr. Wesley Friesen—a longtime psychiatrist of Cindy's—stated he suspected she had borderline personality disorder with elements of post-traumatic stress disorder. By Friesen's account, Cindy possessed a "tremendous amount of rage" toward her father and, based on their numerous sessions, Friesen believed there was a "strong likelihood" that her father sexually abused her when she was a child, though she never indicated this to be the case.

Attempts to discern whether or not Cindy could have bound herself in the state she was discovered were also focused on during the inquest: using the same length of nylon found binding her body, knot expert Robert Chisnall demonstrated in court how she could have bound herself within a three-minute timeframe, before the effects of the narcotics in her system would have taken effect.

The inquest concluded on May 25, 1990, exactly one year after Cindy had disappeared. After deliberations, the jury was unable to determine whether her manner of death was suicide, homicide, or accidental. It was ultimately ruled that Cindy had died of an "unknown event," and the case was formally closed.

== Media representation ==
Cindy's disappearance was profiled on the American series A Current Affair prior to her discovery, and her case was later profiled in a February 1991 episode of the NBC series Unsolved Mysteries. A docuseries was released the same month in Canada via BCTV. Two books chronicling her life, stalking allegations, and death were also published in 1991: The Deaths of Cindy James by Canadian journalist Neal Hall, and Who Killed Cindy James? by British journalist Ian Mulgrew. In September 2021, an Audible-produced podcast on James' death, entitled Death by Unknown Event, was released, featuring narration by actress and writer Pamela Adlon.

== See also ==
- List of solved missing person cases: 1950–1999
- List of unsolved deaths

== Sources ==
- Hall, Neal (1991). The Deaths of Cindy James. Toronto, Ontario: McClelland & Stewart. ISBN 978-0-771-03784-9.
- Miletich, John J. (2003). Homicide Investigation: An Introduction. Lanham, Maryland: Scarecrow Press. ISBN 978-0-810-84625-8.
- Mulgrew, Ian (1991). Who Killed Cindy James?. Toronto, Ontario: Seal Books. ISBN 978-0-770-42445-9.
