= Angela Chalmers =

Canadian retired track and field athlete

Personal information
- Born: September 6, 1963 (age 62) Brandon, Manitoba, Canada
- Education: Northern Arizona University

Sport
- Sport: Track and field
- Events: 1500 m, 3000 m
- College team: Northern Arizona Lumberjacks

Achievements and titles
- Personal bests: 1500 m: 4:01.61 (Paris 1994); Mile: 4:24.91 (Oslo 1991); 2000 m: 5:34.49 NR (Sheffield 1994); 3000 m 8:32.17 NR (Victoria 1994); 5000 m 15:09.35 (Melbourne 1992)
Medal record
Women's track and field
Representing Canada
Olympic Games
| Bronze medal – third place | 1992 Barcelona | 3000 m |
Pan American Games
| Silver medal – second place | 1987 Indianapolis | 3000 m |
Commonwealth Games
| Gold medal – first place | 1994 Victoria | 3000 m |
| Gold medal – first place | 1990 Auckland | 3000 m |
| Gold medal – first place | 1990 Auckland | 1500 m |
Universiade
| Bronze medal – third place | 1985 Kobe | 3000 m |

Angela Chalmers (born September 6, 1963) is a Canadian retired track and field athlete who competed in the 1500 metres and 3000 metres. She is the 1992 Olympic bronze medallist in the 3000 metres, and a three-time Commonwealth gold medallist, winning the 1500m and 3000m in 1990, and the 3000m in 1994.

She is the first Indigenous woman to win an Olympic medal for Canada.

== Career ==
Chalmers was born in Brandon, Manitoba, Canada to a mother from the Birdtail Sioux First Nation and a father of Scottish-Canadian ancestry. She was always an avid runner. She competed with the Canadian National Jr. Track Team, eventually receiving a scholarship to Northern Arizona University. Chalmers first appeared on the international stage in 1985 in Kobe, Japan at the Universiade/FISU World University Games, where she finished third in the 3,000 metres. The following year in Arizona, she won the 1986 NCAA Division I cross country championships for Northern Arizona University. She won the Honda Sports Award as the nation's best female collegiate cross country runner in 1987. This was followed in 1987 with a second place at the Pan American Games in the 3000 meters, in Indianapolis. She finished 14th in the 3000 metres final at the 1988 Seoul Olympics.

In the year 1990, Chalmers won two Commonwealth Games titles in Auckland, New Zealand, winning both the 1500 meter race and the 3000 meter race in a World leading time of 8:38.38. In 1992, she qualified for the Olympics in the cross-country event. even though her father had died in 1984 before the Olympic trials she thought of him while she ran her race. after the race, in which she finished third (behind Yelena Romanova and Tatyana Dorovskikh) and qualified for the bronze medal, she explained to reporters about her father, "I said to him when he was in the hospital that I wanted to prove to him that I could do it".

She was chosen by her team to be the flag bearer at the opening ceremonies of the 1994 Commonwealth games, leading her team into Centennial Stadium. In 1994 in Victoria, Canada, she retained her Commonwealth 3000 m title in a personal best time of 8:32.17, placing her third on the 1994 World rankings (she did not compete in the 1500 meters). She remains the only woman in the history of the Commonwealth Games to successfully defend the 3000 m race. On September 3, 1994, she won the Grand Prix Final of the Women's 1500 meters held in France with a personal best time of 4:01.61. At the height of her career, Chalmers was ranked as one of the top three middle distance runners in the world.

In 2001, Chalmers was inducted into the Manitoba Sports Hall of Fame and Museum, and in 2004 into the BC Sports Hall of Fame. She was a recipient of the National Aboriginal Achievement Award, now the Indspire Awards, in the sports category in 1995. In addition to her successful career, Chalmers was also a spokeswoman. She is of Sioux descent, and used her platform as a professional runner to speak out about Aboriginal peoples. She was inducted into the Athletics Canada Hall of Fame in 2019. In 2019, she was a member of the inaugural class of the Big Sky Hall of Fame.

In 1996, just before the 1996 Atlanta Olympics, Chalmers retired from her career as a Canadian track and field athlete due to a calf injury.

Chalmers is now married to Simon Doyle, an Australian middle distance runner, and is the mother of two children.

== International competitions ==
| Year | Competition | Venue | Position | Event | Notes |
Representing Canada
| 1985 | Universiade | Kobe, Japan | 3rd | 3000 m | 9:03.19 |
| 1987 | Pan American Games | Indianapolis, United States | 2nd | 3000 m | 9:14.48 |
| 1988 | Olympic Games | Seoul, South Korea | 17th (h) | 1500 m | 4:08.64 |
| 1988 | Olympic Games | Seoul, South Korea | 14th | 3000 m | 9:04.75 |
| 1990 | Commonwealth Games | Auckland, New Zealand | 1st | 1500 m | 4:08.41 |
| 1990 | Commonwealth Games | Auckland, New Zealand | 1st | 3000 m | 8:38.38 |
| 1992 | Olympic Games | Barcelona, Spain | 14th (sf) | 1500 m | 4:04.87 |
| 1992 | Olympic Games | Barcelona, Spain | 3rd | 3000 m | 8:47.22 |
| 1994 | Commonwealth Games | Victoria, Canada | 1st | 3000 m | 8:32.17 |
| 1994 | Grand Prix Final | Paris, France | 1st | 1500 m | 4:01.61 |
| 1994 | World Cup | London, United Kingdom | 2nd | 1500 m | 4:01.73 |
(#) Indicates overall position in qualifying heats (h) or semifinals (sf)

Sporting positions
| Preceded by (Romania) Paula Ivan | Women's 3.000m Best Year Performance; 1990 | Succeeded by (South Africa) Elana Meyer |
