= Jon Solly =

British long-distance runner

Personal information
- Nationality: British (English)
- Born: 28 June 1963 (age 63)

Sport
- Sport: Athletics
- Event: Long-distance
- Club: Bingley Harriers
Medal record
Athletics
Representing England
Commonwealth Games
Gold medal – first place	1986 Edinburgh	10,000 Metres
Representing Great Britain
World Road Relay Championships
Silver medal – second place	1986 Hiroshima	Men's race

Jonathan Solly (born 28 June 1963) is a male English former long-distance runner who won a Commonwealth Games gold medal.

== Biography ==
Solly was educated at St Bartholomew's School in Newbury and Durham University, where he graduated with a degree in Politics and Economics in 1985. As a student he was a trialist for the 1984 Olympics in the 3,000 metres. He still holds the university record in the 5,000 metres.

Solly became the British 10,000 metres champion after winning the British AAA Championships title at the 1986 AAA Championships. Shortly afterwards he won the gold medal for England in the 10,000 metres at the 1986 Commonwealth Games in Edinburgh, Scotland. He achieved his personal best time of 27:51.76 minutes at Crystal Palace on 20 June 1986. That season proved to be his peak as a "litany of injuries that could probably fill a medical text book" prevented Solly from reproducing his best form in the years ahead.

Solly is now a cabinet maker based at a workshop in Thame, Oxfordshire.
