= Jorge Vara =

Argentine politician

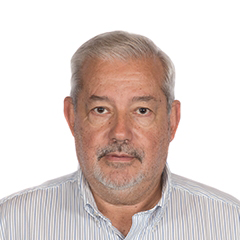

Member of the Chamber of Deputies of Argentina
- Incumbent
- Assumed office 10 December 2019
- Constituency: Corrientes

Personal details
- Born: 13 March 1956 (age 70)
- Party: Radical Civic Union
- Occupation: Agriculture Engineer

Jorge Vara is an Argentine politician who is a member of the Chamber of Deputies.

== Biography ==
Vara worked as an agriculture engineer before he was elected in 2019.
