= Alison Wyeth =

English runner

Personal information
- Born: 26 May 1964 (age 62) Southampton, England
- Height: 1.78 m (5 ft 10 in)
- Weight: 58 kg (128 lb)

Sport
- Sport: Track and field
- Event: Long-distance
- Club: Parkside Harrow AC
Medal record
Athletics
Representing England
Commonwealth Games
Bronze medal – third place	1994 Victoria	3000m

Alison Wyeth (born 26 May 1964) is an English former middle and long-distance runner, who represented Great Britain at the Olympic Games in 1992 and 1996, as well as at three World Championships.

== Athletics career ==
In addition to her Olympic appearances Wyeth finished 5th in the 3000 metres final at the 1993 World Championships. She won AAAs Championship titles at 1500m (1993), 3000m (1989) and 5000m (1995), and twice won the UK Athletics Championships title at 1500 m (1990–91). She represented England in the 3,000 metres event, at the 1990 Commonwealth Games in Auckland, New Zealand. Four years later she represented England and won a bronze medal in the 3,000 metres event, at the 1994 Commonwealth Games in Victoria, British Columbia, Canada.

Wyeth started coaching in 2001.

== Personal life ==
Wyeth was born in Southampton, England. She was once married to a fellow British runner, John Nuttall, but has since divorced. They have two children, Hannah Nuttall and Luke Nuttall, both of whom are runners as well.

== Competition record ==
Year	Competition	Venue	Position	Event	Notes
Representing Great Britain and England
1987	World Cross Country Championships	Warsaw, Poland	96th	Senior race (5.05 km)	18:26
1989	World Cross Country Championships	Stavanger, Norway	28th	Senior race (6 km)	23:43
1990	Commonwealth Games	Auckland, New Zealand	11th	3000 m	9:23.12
1990	World Cross Country Championships	Aix-les-Bains, France	99th	Senior race (6 km)	21:09
1990	European Championships	Split, Yugoslavia	10th	3000 m	8:52:26
1991	World Cross Country Championships	Antwerp, Belgium	36th	Senior race (6.425 km)	21:32
1991	World Championships	Tokyo, Japan	11th	3000 m	8:44.73
1992	Olympic Games	Barcelona, Spain	9th	3000 m	9:00.23
1993	World Championships	Stuttgart, Germany	5th	3000 m	8:38.42
1994	European Indoor Championships	Paris, France	6th	3000 m	9:04.35
1994	European Championships	Helsinki, Finland	6th	3000 m	8:45:76
1994	Commonwealth Games	Victoria, Canada	3rd	3000 m	8:47.98
1995	World Championships	Gothenburg, Sweden	–	5000 m	DNF
1996	Olympic Games	Atlanta, United States	44th (h)	5000 m	16:24.74
1998	World Half Marathon Championships	Uster, Switzerland	67th	Half marathon	1:16:44

== Personal bests ==
Outdoor

- 1500 metres – 4:03.17 (Monaco 1993)
- One mile – 4:24.87 (Oslo 1991)
- 3000 metres – 8:38.42 (Stuttgart 1993)
- 5000 metres – 15:00.37 (London 1995)
- Half marathon – 1:10:54 (The Hague 1998)
- Marathon – 2:38:26 (Edinburgh 1999)

Indoor

- 3000 metres – 9:03.59 (Birmingham 1993)
