= Tomoaki Kunichika =

Japanese long-distance runner

Tomoaki Kunichika (Japanese: 国近 友昭; born April 22, 1973, in Yamaguchi) is a male long-distance runner from Japan, who won the 2003 edition of the Fukuoka Marathon, clocking 2:07:52 on December 7, 2003.

== Achievements ==
Year	Competition	Venue	Position	Event	Notes
Representing Japan
2003	Fukuoka Marathon	Fukuoka, Japan	1st	Marathon	2:07:52
2004	Olympic Games	Athens, Greece	42nd	Marathon	2:21:13
