= Daniela Petrescu =

Romanian long-distance runner

Daniela Petrescu (née Bran; born 13 April 1968) is a long-distance runner from Romania, who specializes mainly in the 3000 metres steeplechase. She is a former world record holder in this obstacle race, clocking 9:55.28 on 21 June 1998 in Bucharest.

Records
Preceded by (Canada) Karen Harvey	Women's 3,000m Steeplechase; World Record Holder; June 21, 1998 – July 31, 1999	Succeeded by (Russia) Yelena Motalova
Sporting positions
Preceded by (United States) Melissa Teemant	Women's 3,000m Steeplechase; Best Year Performance; 1998	Succeeded by (Russia) Yelena Motalova
