= Carl Thackery =

British long-distance runner

Personal information
- Nationality: British (English)
- Born: 14 October 1962 (age 63) Sheffield, England

Sport
- Sport: Athletics
- Event: long-distance
- Club: Hallamshire Harriers
Medal record
Representing Great Britain
World Half Marathon Championships
Silver medal – second place	1992 Tyneside	Men's team
Bronze medal – third place	1993 Brussels	Men's race
Bronze medal – third place	1993 Brussels	Men's team
World Road Relay Championships
Silver medal – second place	1986 Hiroshima	Men's race
Representing England
World Cross Country Championships
Silver medal – second place	1987 Warsaw	Men's team

Carl Edward Thackery (born 14 October 1962) is a retired British long-distance runner, who competed in the 1980s and 1990s. His daughter Calli Hauger-Thackery is an international marathon runner.

== Biography ==
Thackery was born in Sheffield and was a member of the Hallamshire Harriers of Sheffield. He became the Yorkshire champion and set a British six mile road race record in August 1985.

He finished 14th in the 1986 European Athletics Championships – Men's 10,000 metres, won team silver at the 1987 IAAF World Cross Country Championships – Senior men's race (where he finished 20th), and won team silver at the IAAF World Road Relay Championships in 1986, helping to set a UK record for the road marathon relay in the process.

He represented England in the marathon event, at the 1990 Commonwealth Games in Auckland, New Zealand.

At a domestic level, he was the British 10,000 metres champion after winning the British AAA Championships title at the 1991 AAA Championships. and the English Inter-Counties Cross Country champion in 1987.

He ran twice for Great Britain in the IAAF World Half Marathon Championships, finishing 16th and winning team silver in 1992 and winning individual and team bronzes in 1993.

Thackery won a number of prestigious international road races, including the City-Pier-City Half Marathon in The Hague, the Roma-Ostia Half Marathon (twice), the 15 km Seven Hills Race (Zevenheuvelenloop) in Nijmegen, the Netherlands, the Cherry Blossom Ten Mile Run in Washington DC, the Trevira Twosome 10 miles in New York Central Park, the Jean Bouin Memorial in Barcelona (twice), and La Matesina 10 km in Bojano/Italy. In the UK, he won the Nike Blaydon Race in 1998 and ran world-class sub-46.40 min times when winning the Brampton-Carlisle and Erewash 10 miles in 1991 and 1992 respectively. Thackery also won two Grand Prix track races in 1987 – the 10,000 metres at the Paris BNP meeting and the one-hour event at the Herculis meeting in Monaco. His half-marathon personal best of 61 min 04 sec ranked him first in the world in 1987. Thackery set the British and Commonwealth records for 20,000 metres and one hour on the track at La Flèche in France in 1990.

== Personal Bests ==
- 10,000 metres 27.59.24 Paris 1987,
- 10 km 28.14 Hiroshima 1986,
- 10 miles 46.26 Washington DC 1991,
- 20,000 metres 57.28.7 La Flèche 1990,
- 20 km 59.01 Perros-Guirec/France 1996,
- One hour 20.855 km La Flèche 1990,
- Half marathon 61.04 Barnsley 1987,
- Marathon 2.12.37 Carpi/Italy 1992
