= Luke Nuttall =

British Paralympic athlete (born 2001)

Personal information
- Born: 17 September 2001 (age 24) Preston, Lancashire, Great Britain

Sport
- Sport: Paralympic athletics
- Disability class: T46
- Event: 1500 metres
Medal record
Paralympic athletics
Representing United Kingdom
European Championships
Silver medal – second place	2018 Berlin	1500m T46
Bronze medal – third place	2021 Bydgoszcz	1500m T46

Luke Nuttall (born 17 September 2001) is a British Paralympic athlete who competes in the 1500m in the T46 classification.

He is the son of the late Olympian John Nuttall, who was a long distance runner himself.

== Athletics career ==
Nuttall is based in Charnwood, and began his career competing in county and national-level events. He is coached by his mother, Alison Wyeth. By 2018, he had been selected for GB Paralympics, where aged 17 he won silver in the 2018 World Para Athletics European Championships, finishing second to Bulgaria's Hristiyan Stoyanov. In 2020, he claimed bronze in the 2021 European Para Athletics Championships in Bydgoszcz with a seven-second personal best. Later that summer, he was selected to represent Great Britain at the 2020 Summer Paralympics in the T46 1500m.

At the 2024 Summer Paralympics, Luke competed in the T46 1500m, placing 6th with a seasons best of 3:57.62.

== Personal life ==
Nuttall was born in Preston, Lancashire. He is the son of former British Olympic long-distance runners John Nuttall, and Alison Wyeth, and has an older sister, Hannah Nuttall, who also became a runner. His stepmother and stepsister are Liz McColgan and Eilish McColgan, both of whom have also competed at the Olympics in long distance running.
