= Volodymyr Shesterov =

Personal information
- Full name: Volodymyr Oleksandrvyvch Shesterov
- Nationality: Soviet
- Born: 16 January 1954 (age 72) Ukraine, Soviet Union
- Height: 176 cm (5 ft 9 in)
- Weight: 65 kg (143 lb)

Sport
- Sport: Long-distance running
- Event: 10,000 metres

Volodymyr Oleksandrovich Shesterov (Ukrainian: Володимир Олександрович Шестеров; Russian: Владимир Александрович Шестеров born 16 January 1954) is a Soviet long-distance runner. He competed in the men's 10,000 metres at the 1980 Summer Olympics.
