= Lisa York (runner) =

British long-distance runner

Personal information
- Nationality: British (English)
- Born: 10 March 1970 (age 55) Rugby, Warwickshire, England
- Height: 168 cm (5 ft 6 in)
- Weight: 50 kg (110 lb)

Sport
- Sport: Athletics
- Event(s): Middle and Long-distance running
- Club: Leicester Coritanian AC

Lisa York (born 10 March 1970) is a British former middle and long-distance runner who competed at the 1992 Summer Olympics.

== Biography ==
York, born in Rugby, Warwickshire, became the British 3,000 metres champion after winning the British AAA Championships title at the 1992 AAA Championships.

Shortly afterwards at the 1992 Olympic Games in Barcelona, York represented Great Britain in the women's 3000 metres event, where she ran a lifetime best of 8:47.71 in her heat, to narrowly miss the final.

== International competitions ==
Year	Competition	Venue	Position	Event	Notes
Representing Great Britain
1989	World Cross Country Championships (Junior race)	Stavanger, Norway	58th	4 km	17:13
1989	European Junior Championships	Varaždin, Yugoslavia	5th	1500 m	4:15.39
1989	European Junior Championships	Varaždin, Yugoslavia	5th	3000 m	9:23.65
1991	World Cross Country Championships	Antwerp, Belgium	76th	6.4 km	22:07
1992	World Cross Country Championships	Boston, United States	34th	6.4 km	22:17
1992	Olympic Games	Barcelona, Spain	heats	3000 m	8:47.71
