= Nina Christiansen =

Danish long-distance runner

Personal information
- Nationality: Danish
- Born: 7 June 1964 (age 62)

Sport
- Sport: Long-distance running
- Event: 5000 metres

Nina Christiansen (born 7 June 1964) is a Danish long-distance runner. She competed in the women's 5000 metres at the 1996 Summer Olympics.
