= Marina Yachmenyova =

Russian middle-distance runner

Marina Yachmenyova (Russian: Марина Ячменёва; born 14 July 1961) is a retired middle distance runner who represented the Soviet Union and later Russia. She specialized in the 1500 metres run. Her main achievement was coming second in the European Indoor Championships in 1989.

== Achievements ==
Year	Tournament	Venue	Result	Extra
1987	World Championships	Rome, Italy	13th	1500 m
1989	World Indoor Championships	Budapest, Hungary	4th	1500 m
	European Indoor Championships	The Hague, Netherlands	2nd	1500 m
