= Carlos Patrício =

Portuguese long-distance runner

Carlos Manuel Gonçalves Patrício (born 9 October 1964) is a retired long-distance runner from Portugal, who won the 1993 edition of the Vienna Marathon. He represented his native country in the men's 10,000 metres at the 1996 Summer Olympics. He set his personal best time (2:11:57) in the Half Marathon on 27 September 1998 in Uster.

== Achievements ==
Year	Competition	Venue	Position	Event	Notes
Representing Portugal
1993	Vienna Marathon	Vienna, Austria	1st	Marathon	2:11:00
1993	World Championships	Stuttgart, Germany	—	Marathon	DNF
