= William Sigei =

Kenyan long-distance runner

Medal record

Men's athletics

Representing Kenya

African Championships
Gold medal – first place	1993 Durban	10,000 m

William Cheruiyot Sigei (born 11 October 1969 in Cheboi'ngong' village, just outside Kapsimotwo village, Bomet, Kenya) is a former Kenyan long-distance runner who won the IAAF World Cross Country Championships in 1993 and 1994. In 1994 he set a new world record over 10,000 metres in Oslo with 26:52.23 minutes.

As of 2021, he is ranked thirty seventh of all times over 10,000 metres. The current world record is 26:11.00 minutes, and belongs to Joshua Cheptegei of Uganda.

Records
Preceded by Yobes Ondieki	Men's 10,000 m world record holder 22 July 1994 – 5 June 1995	Succeeded by Haile Gebrselassie
