= William Koech =

Kenyan long-distance runner

William Koech (born December 2, 1961) is a retired Kenyan long-distance runner who specialized in the 10,000 metres.

In 1991 he won a silver medal in the 10,000 metres at the All-Africa Games held in Cairo. He finished seventh in the same distance at the 1992 Summer Olympics.

== Achievements ==
Year	Competition	Venue	Position	Event	Notes
Representing Kenya
1997	World Championships	Athens, Greece	—	Marathon	DNF
