= Ezequiel Bitok =

Kenyan runner

Medal record

Men's athletics

Representing Kenya

African Championships
Gold medal – first place	1990 Cairo	5000 m

Ezekiel Bitok (born 15 February 1966) is a retired Kenyan runner.

== Achievements ==
Year	Competition	Venue	Position	Event	Notes
Representing Kenya
1991	World Cross Country Championships	Antwerp, Belgium	8th	Long race	
1993	World Cross Country Championships	Amorebieta, Spain	5th	Long race	
1993	World Cross Country Championships	Amorebieta, Spain	1st	Team	
1996	Olympic Games	Atlanta, United States	56th	Marathon	2:23:03
1997	Monaco Marathon	Monte Carlo, Monaco	1st	Marathon	2:12:30
1998	Monaco Marathon	Monte Carlo, Monaco	1st	Marathon	2:11:48
