= Anne Hare =

New Zealand distance runner

Personal information
- Born: Caroline Anne McKenzie; 7 June 1964 (age 62) Wellington, New Zealand

Sport
- Country: New Zealand
- Sport: Athletics
- Event: Running

Achievements and titles
- Personal best: 2000 m: 5:44.67 (1986, NR)

Caroline Anne Hare (née McKenzie; born 7 June 1964) is a New Zealand former runner from Wellington. She currently holds the New Zealand women's record for the 2000 m.

Hare competed at the 1996 Summer Olympics, where she placed 13th in the women's 5000 m final. She was a participant at three Commonwealth Games, in 1986, 1990 and 1994.

Hare was a board member on the New Zealand Olympic Committee from 2008 to 2010.

In 1990, Hare was awarded the New Zealand 1990 Commemoration Medal.

== Personal bests ==
Distance	Time	Place	Date
2000 m	5:44.67 NR	Crystal Palace, England	11 July 1986
