= 2020 Ukrainian Athletics Championships =

- Dates: 29–30 August
- Host city: Lutsk
- Venue: Avanhard
- Level: Senior
- Type: Outdoor
- Events: 40
- Participation: 493 athletes from 3 nations

2020 Ukrainian Athletics Championships among the athletes of the senior age category was held on 29–30 August in Lutsk at Avanhard Stadium.

The competition was originally scheduled for 19–21 June. However, it was postponed to a later date due to the COVID-19 pandemic. Finally, the competition dates were set to 29–30 August.

Throughout the year, a number of standalone national championships in different events not contested in Lutsk will be held among the athletes of the senior age category.

== Medalists ==
=== Men ===
Events	Gold		Silver		Bronze	
100 metres	Oleksandr Sokolov	10.47	Serhiy Smelyk	10.53 SB	Stanislav Kovalenko	10.65
200 metres	Serhiy Smelyk	21.00	Oleksandr Sokolov	21.12 PB	Emil Ibrahimov	21.38
400 metres	Oleksandr Pohorilko	46.77 PB	Danylo Danylenko	47.00 SB	Oleksiy Pozdnyakov	47.54 SB
800 metres	Yevhen Hutsol	1:49.17	Oleh Myronets	1:49.26 SB	Vladyslav Finchuk	1:49.31 SB
1500 metres	Oleh Kayafa	3:46.31	Vladyslav Kovalenko	3:46.75 PB	Artem Alfimov	3:46.80
5000 metres	Vasyl Koval	14:07.92 SB	Ivan Strebkov	14:21.64 SB	Roman Romanenko	14:22.16 SB
110 metres hurdles	Victor Solyanov	14.11	Andriy Vasylevskyi	14.24 PB	Kyrylo Khomenko	14.86
400 metres hurdles	Dmytro Romanyuk	50.60 PB	Denys Nechyporenko	50.88 SB	Yuriy Barantsov	51.96 PB
3000 metres steeplechase	Roman Rostykus	9:07.10	Yuriy Hrytsak	9:11.75 SB	Vasyl Sabunyak	9:13.32 SB
4 × 100 metres	Sumy Oblast; Artem Danylchenko; Yaroslav Demchenko; Oleksiy Serhiyenko; Volodymyr Suprun	41.06	Chernivtsi Oblast; Davyd Yanovskyi; Emil Ibrahimov; Oleksandr Pomohayev; Maksym Makoviychuk	41.58	Kyiv; Vasyl Makukh; Renat Polishchuk; Artem Shamatryn; Kyrylo Khomenko	41.83
4 × 400 metres	Sumy Oblast; Yevhen Shvets; Yaroslav Demchenko; Kostyantyn Ozhiyov; Oleksandr Pohorilko	3:11.33	Kharkiv Oblast; Victor Holubyev; Valentyn Diravka; Mykhaylo Simbiryov; Dmytro Bikulov	3:19.90	Rivne Oblast; Vladyslav Novak; Yaroslav Holub; Maksym Lehkyi; Roman Dolhushyn	3:21.46
High jump	Andriy Protsenko	2.30 SB	Dmytro Yakovenko	2.26 SB	Oleh Doroshchuk	2.23 PB
Pole vault	Artur Bortnikov	5.30 PB	Illya Kravchenko	5.30 SB	Kyrylo Kiru	5.20 SB
Long jump	Yaroslav Isachenkov	7.97 PB	Ihor Honchar	7.80w	Anton Kopytko	7.41 SB
Triple jump	Ihor Honchar	16.18 PB	Vladyslav Shepelyev	16.16 PB	Oleksandr Malosilov	16.11 SB
Shot put	Ihor Musiyenko	19.48 SB	Victor Samolyuk	18.01 SB	Stepan Demyanchuk	17.40
Discus throw	Mykyta Nesterenko	55.10 SB	Oleksiy Kyrylin	52.22 PB	Oleksandr Shylivskyi	50.85 PB
Hammer throw	Mykhaylo Kokhan	75.39	Hlib Piskunov	72.94 SB	Serhiy Perevoznikov	69.68 SB
Javelin throw	Oleksandr Nychyporchuk	72.36 SB	Mykola Kalyush	65.20 SB	Dmytro Sheremet	64.87
Decathlon	Oleksiy Kasyanov	7716	Vadym Adamchuk	6836	Yaroslav Bohdan	6692

=== Women ===
Events	Gold		Silver		Bronze	
100 metres	Yana Kachur	11.76 SB	Tetyana Melnyk	11.80 SB	Hanna Chubkovtsova	11.96 SB
200 metres	Tetyana Melnyk	23.59 SB	Hanna Chubkovtsova	24.09	Tetyana Kaysen	24.76 SB
400 metres	Hanna Ryzhykova	51.70 PB	Kateryna Klymiuk	51.84 PB	Alina Lohvynenko	52.62 SB
800 metres	Olha Lyakhova	2:03.49	Svitlana Zhulzhyk	2:05.04	Darya Vdovychenko	2:05.07 PB
1500 metres	Orysya Demyanyuk	4:21.67 PB	Anna Mishchenko	4:22.67 SB	Viktoriya Kovba	4:25.57 PB
5000 metres	Yuliya Shmatenko	15:49.59 SB	Valeriya Zinenko	16:34.63 SB	Olesya Didovodyuk	16:38.07 PB
100 metres hurdles	Hanna Plotitsyna	13.35 SB	Hanna Chubkovtsova	13.60	Olena Yanovska	13.87
400 metres hurdles	Viktoriya Tkachuk	55.60 SB	Mariya Mykolenko	56.72	Tetyana Bezshyiko	59.17 SB
3000 metres steeplechase	Nataliya Strebkova	10:01.77 SB	Hanna Zhmurko	10:28.51 SB	Viktoriya Fedchyk	10:56.16 SB
4 × 100 metres	Kyiv; Iryna Panarina; Tetyana Melnyk; Hanna Chubkovtsova; Yana Kachur	45.55	Vinnytsia Oblast; Olena Yanovska; Mariya Cherkas; Yuliya Chekhivska; Anna Dorofeyeva	47.26	Kharkiv Oblast; Анастасія Черненко; Карина Файнберг; Жанна Ярушевська; Єва Подгородецька	47.34
4 × 400 metres	Donetsk Oblast; Viktoriya Tkachuk; Mariya Mykolenko; Olena Radyuk-Kuchuk; Alina Lohvynenko	3:44.50	Vinnytsia Oblast; Inna Kovtun; Tetyana Doroshenko; Mariya Cherkas; Yuliya Chekhivska	3:50.60	Lviv Oblast; Yuliya Hryhoryeva; Orysya Demyanyuk; Renata Mekhanchuk; Maryana Shostak	3:51.69
High jump	Oksana Okunyeva	1.92 SB	Yuliya Chumachenko	1.86 SB	Liliya Klintsova	1.80
Pole vault	Maryna Kylypko	4.40 SB	Yana Hladiychuk	4.30 SB	Yuliya Kozub	4.00 PB
Long jump	Maryna Bekh-Romanchuk	6.81	Christina Hryshutina	6.41 SB	Oksana Martynova	6.25
Triple jump	Iryna Pimenova	13.40 SB	Tetyana Ptashkina	13.39 SB	Maryna Siney	13.39 PB
Shot put	Olha Holodna	16.02 SB	Tetyana Kravchenko	15.25 SB	Svitlana Marusenko	14.68 SB
Discus throw	Natalya Semenova	54.67 SB	Darya Harkusha	48.72 SB	Kateryna Lebid	40.38
Hammer throw	Iryna Klymets	71.71	Alyona Shamotina	66.93	Yuliya Kysylyova	58.85 SB
Javelin throw	Tetyana Nychyporchuk	54.03	Margaryta Dorozhon (ISR)	53.79 SB	Hanna Hatsko	50.75 SB
Heptathlon	Alina Shukh	6215	Hanna Kasyanova	5962	Anastasiya Mokhnyuk	5925

== Other championships ==
=== Stadium events ===
- 2020 Ukrainian Winter Throwing Championships was held on 14–16 February in Mukachevo. Athletes contested in three throwing events (discus throw, hammer throw and javelin throw). It was the key competition for selection of the national team for the European Throwing Cup.
- 2020 Ukrainian 10,000 Metres Championships was originally scheduled for 25 April in Uzhhorod at Avanhard Stadium. However, it was postponed to a later date due to the COVID-19 pandemic. Finally, it was scheduled for 15 August in Lutsk at Avanhard Stadium.

==== Men ====
Events	Gold		Silver		Bronze	
Discus throw (winter)	Mykyta Nesterenko	55.66 SB	Ivan Povalyashko	51.64 SB	Dmytro Oleksenko	50.34 SB
Hammer throw (winter)	Serhiy Perevoznikov	72.68 SB	Mykhaylo Havrylyuk	71.30	Petro Vivcharuk	60.10 SB
Javelin throw (winter)	Dmytro Sheremet	73.18 SB	Mykola Kalyush	69.54 SB	Oleksandr Kozubskyi	65.75 SB
10,000 metres	Bohdan-Ivan Horodyskyi	28:31.29 SB	Vasyl Koval	29:02.20 SB	Artem Kazban	29:09.61 PB

==== Women ====
Events	Gold		Silver		Bronze	
Discus throw (winter)	Natalia Semenova	55.64 SB	Svitlana Marusenko	43.93 PB	Oleksandra Leshchenko	30.56 SB
Hammer throw (winter)	Iryna Klymets	69.35 SB	Alyona Shamotina	65.86 SB	Yuliya Kysylyova	58.94 SB
Javelin throw (winter)	Hanna Hatsko	60.45 SB	Tetyana Nychyporchuk	51.20 SB	Anastasiya Ivanova	44.30 SB
10,000 metres	Valeriya Zinenko	32:42.72 PB	Yevheniya Prokofyeva	32:53.20 PB	Bohdana Semyonova	33:01.55 PB

=== Road race walk ===
- 2020 Ukrainian Winter Race Walking Championships was held on 14 March in Ivano-Frankivsk.
- 2020 Ukrainian 20 Kilometres Race Walk Championships was originally scheduled for 16 June in Sumy. However, it was first postponed to a later date due to the COVID-19 pandemic. Finally, it was scheduled for 18 October in Ivano-Frankivsk.
- 2020 Ukrainian 50 Kilometres Race Walk Championships will be held on 18 October in Ivano-Frankivsk.

==== Men ====
Events	Gold		Silver		Bronze	
20 kilometres race walk (winter)	Eduard Zabuzhenko	1:20:46 PB	Viktor Shumik	1:21:35	Nazar Kovalenko	1:21:55
35 kilometers race walk (winter)	Serhiy Budza	2:37:18 SB	Anton Radko	2:37:38 SB	Dmytro Sobchuk	2:40:07 SB
20 kilometres race walk	Ivan Losev	1:21:44 SB	Eduard Zabuzhenko	1:22:05	Nazar Kovalenko	1:22:28
50 kilometres race walk	Ihor Hlavan	3:47:31 SB	Serhiy Budza	3:49:47 SB	Valeriy Litaniuk	3:52:58 SB

==== Women ====
Events	Gold		Silver		Bronze	
20 kilometres race walk (winter)	Lyudmyla Olyanovska	1:29:13 SB	Olena Sobchuk	1:29:54	Mariya Sakharuk	1:30:22
35 kilometers race walk (winter)	Valentyna Myronchuk	2:56:34 SB	Oleksandra Olyanovska	3:15:20 PB	Oksana Kulahina	3:19:28
20 kilometres race walk	Lyudmyla Olyanovska	1:29:18 SB	Mariya Sakharuk	1:29:43 SB	Olena Sobchuk	1:30:05 SB
50 kilometres race walk	Khrystyna Yudkina	4:32:30 SB	Tamara Havrylyuk	4:38:36 PB	Oksana Kulahina	4:50:38 PB

=== Trail, mountain and cross country running ===
2020 national championships in trail, mountain (uphill-downhill, uphill and long distance) and cross country running were cancelled due to the COVID-19 pandemic.

=== Road running ===
- 2020 Ukrainian Half Marathon Championships was originally scheduled for 16 May in Kovel. However, it was first postponed to a later date due to the COVID-19 pandemic. Finally, it was held on 13 September in Kovel.
- 2020 Ukrainian 12-hour, 24-hour and 48-hour Running Championships was held on 14–16 August in Vinnytsia.
- 2020 national championships in the rest of the road running events (1 mile, 10 km, 50 km, 100 km, marathon) were cancelled due to the COVID-19 pandemic.

==== Men ====
Events	Gold		Silver		Bronze	
Half marathon	Bohdan-Ivan Horodyskyi	1:04:00 PB	Mykola Nyzhnyk	1:05:05 SB	Ihor Porozov	1:05:08 SB
12-hour run	Oleksandr Pyatakov	116.705 km	Maksym Popov	112.466 km	Andriy Kozyr	107.326 km
24-hour run	Volodymyr Khanas	215.879 km	Dmytro Mikheyev	203.602 km	Taras Khrystenko	193.945 km
48-hour run	Valeriy Shazhko	314.737 km	Dmytro Krasnov	311.235 km	Dmytro Voytko	285.898 km

==== Women ====
Events	Gold		Silver		Bronze	
Half marathon	Yevheniya Prokofyeva	1:11:14 PB	Victoriya Khapilina	1:12:24 PB	Oleksandra Shafar	1:13:20 SB
12-hour run	Anna Rangayeva	110.100 km	Kateryna Dolgan	94.743 km	Brukvenko Liudmyla	56.056 km
24-hour run	Mikhaela Englaro (BUL)	193.684 km	Valentyna Kovalska	187.389 km	Nikolayenko Viktoriya	185.348 km
48-hour run	Olha Stadnyk	261.804 km	Svitlana Samarina	229.248 km	Iryna Petrenko	222.202 km

== Live stream ==
Ukrainian Athletics streamed all events of the main (29-30 August) and racewalk (18 October) championships live:

=== Main champs ===
- Main stream:
  - Day 1 (morning session) on YouTube
  - Day 1 (afternoon session) on YouTube
  - Day 2 (morning session) on YouTube
  - Day 2 (afternoon session) on YouTube
- Stream of certain events:
  - Day 1 (29 August):
    - Morning session (high jump) on YouTube
    - Morning session (long jump, triple jump) on YouTube
    - Afternoon session (high jump) on YouTube
    - Afternoon session (long jump, triple jump) on YouTube
    - Afternoon session (pole vault, javelin throw) on YouTube
    - Afternoon session (hammer throw, discus throw) on YouTube
    - Afternoon session (shot put) on YouTube
  - Day 2 (30 August):
    - Morning session (pole vault, javelin throw) on YouTube
    - Morning session (hammer throw, discus throw) on YouTube
    - Afternoon session (high jump) on YouTube
    - Afternoon session (long jump, triple jump) on YouTube
    - Afternoon session (pole vault, javelin throw) on YouTube

=== Racewalk champs ===
- Racewalk champs on YouTube

== See also ==
- 2020 Ukrainian Athletics Indoor Championships
