= 2019 Ukrainian Athletics Championships =

- Dates: 21–23 August
- Host city: Lutsk
- Venue: Avanhard
- Level: Senior
- Type: Outdoor
- Events: 36

2019 Ukrainian Athletics Championships among the athletes of the senior age category was held from 21 to 23 August in Lutsk at Avanhard Stadium.

Throughout the year, a number of standalone national championships in different events not contested in Lutsk were held among the athletes of the senior age category.

== Championships geography ==
In total, 15 cities and villages from 11 oblasts of Ukraine will host the senior national championships in athletics:

- Lutsk — main championships (21-23 August)
- Mukachevo — winter throwing (15-17 February) and mountain running (uphill-downhill) (9 June)
- Volovets — mountain running (uphill) (2 June)
- Uzhhorod — relays (18-19 May) and cross country running (30-31 October)
- Melitopol — 10,000 metres (25 May)
- Ivano-Frankivsk — winter race walk (23-24 March) and 50 km race walk (19-20 жовтня), both on road
- Vyzhnytsia — trail running (6-7 April)
- Chernivtsi — one mile road run (29 September)
- Vinnytsia — 48-hour run (28-30 June)
- Sumy — 20 km road race walk (16 June)
- Skole — long-distance mountain running (16 June)
- Lviv — 10 km road run (15 September)
- Poltava — half marathon (1 September)
- Kyiv — 12-hour and 24-hour run (21-22 September)
- Bila Tserkva — marathon (6 October)
Host cities and villages of Ukrainian senior athletics championships in 2019

== Medalists ==
=== Men ===
Events	Gold		Silver		Bronze	
100 metres	Stanislav Kovalenko	10.48	Ihor Bodrov	10.56 SB	Erik Kostrytsya	10.57
200 metres	Serhiy Smelyk	20.52 SB	Ihor Bodrov	21.17 SB	Dmytro Vitkovskyi	21.43
400 metres	Danylo Danylenko	46.66	Oleksiy Pozdnyakov	47.09	Dmytro Bikulov	47.28 SB
800 metres	Yevhen Hutsol	1:48.06	Oleh Myronets	1:48.17 PB	Dmytro Bikulov	1:48.38 SB
1500 metres	Stanislav Maslov	3:54.67	Yurii Kishchenko	3:54.70	Oleksandr Karpenko	3:55.23
5000 metres	Volodymyr Kyts	14:09.55 SB	Stanislav Maslov	14:10.14	Oleksiy Obukhovskyi	14:16.62 PB
110 metres hurdles	Artem Shamatryn	14.03	Kyrylo Khomenko	14.05	Oleksiy Kasyanov	14.20 SB
400 metres hurdles	Denys Nechyporenko	50.78 SB	Dmytro Romanyuk	51.23	Yuriy Barantsov	53.06 SB
3000 metres steeplechase	Vasyl Koval	8:57.97	Roman Rostykus	9:03.88	Serhiy Shevchenko	9:05.13 SB
High jump	Andriy Protsenko	2.23	Dmytro Dem'yanyuk	2.20 =SB	Vadym Kravchuk	2.20
Pole vault	Kyrylo Kiru	5.30 =SB	Taras Shevtsov	5.30 PB	Artur Bortnikov	5.10
Long jump	Vladyslav Mazur	8.01 SB	Yaroslav Isachenkov	7.77	Serhiy Kruk	7.70 SB
Triple jump	Oleksandr Malosilov	16.14	Artem Konovalenko	15.98	Oleksandr Popko	15.27
Shot put	Roman Kokoshko	19.70 PB	Viktor Samolyuk	19.08	Ihor Musiyenko	18.16
Discus throw	Mykyta Nesterenko	61.13 SB	Ivan Panasyuk	53.03	Oleksiy Kasyanov	50.97 SB
Hammer throw	Mykhaylo Kokhan	73.94	Serhiy Perevoznikov	73.07	Hlib Piskunov	71.85
Javelin throw	Oleksandr Nychyporchuk	74.62	Yuriy Kushniruk	73.61	Dmytro Sheremet	70.14
Decathlon	Ruslan Malohlovets	7330	Vadym Adamchuk	7009	Yaroslav Bohdan	6962 PB

=== Women ===
Events	Gold		Silver		Bronze	
100 metres	Viktoriya Ratnikova	11.53w	Yeva Podhorodetska	11.93w	Mariya Mokrova	11.96w
200 metres	Tetiana Kaysen	23.66 PB	Yelyzaveta Bryzhina	23.72 SB	Hanna Chubkovtsova	23.99
400 metres	Hanna Ryzhykova	52.55	Tetyana Melnyk	52.74	Kateryna Klymiuk	53.03
800 metres	Viktoriya Nikolenko	2:06.53 PB	Anastasiya Ryemyen	2:06.89	Yuliya Chekhivska	2:10.89
1500 metres	Anna Mishchenko	4:19.72	Orysya Demyanyuk	4:24.62	Anastasiya Ryemyen	4:26.95
5000 metres	Viktoriya Kalyuzhna	16:28.48 SB	Mariya Khodakivska	16:37.98	Olesya Didovodyuk	16:55.23
100 metres hurdles	Hanna Plotitsyna	13.10w	Oksana Shkurat	13.17w	Hanna Chubkovtsova	13.25w
400 metres hurdles	Hanna Ryzhykova	55.48	Mariya Mykolenko	56.73	Olena Kolesnichenko	57.27
3000 metres steeplechase	Mariya Shatalova	10:12.75 SB	Hanna Zhmurko	10:23.17 PB	Yaroslava Yastreb	10:42.90 PB
High jump	Yuliya Levchenko	2.00 SB	Yaroslava Mahuchikh	1.96	Iryna Herashchenko	1.94
Pole vault	Maryna Kylypko	4.50	Yana Hladiychuk	4.00	Yuliya Maksymenko	3.80
Long jump	Maryna Bekh-Romanchuk	6.79	Yuliya Firsova	6.21	Anastasiya Cheremisina	6.17
Triple jump	Hanna Krasutska	13.66w	Kateryna Popova	13.29 SB	Tetyana Holovchuk	13.08 PB
Shot put	Olha Holodna	17.32 SB	Viktoriya Klochko	15.52 SB	Hanna Samolyuk	15.52
Discus throw	Natalia Semenova	58.47	Viktoriya Savytska	55.61 PB	Viktoriya Klochko	51.94
Hammer throw	Iryna Klymets	71.08	Iryna Novozhylova	65.34	Valeriya Ivanenko	60.07
Javelin throw	Hanna Hatsko-Fedusova	55.76	Tetyana Fetiskina	52.83	Oleksandra Zarytska	48.73
Heptathlon	Daryna Sloboda	6208 PB	Alina Shukh	6178 SB	Rimma Buynenko	6079 PB

== Other championships ==
=== Stadium events ===
- 2019 Ukrainian Winter Throwing Championships was held on 15–17 February in Mukachevo. Athletes contested in three throwing events (discus throw, hammer throw and javelin throw). It was the key competition for selection of the national team for the European Throwing Cup.
- 2019 Ukrainian Relays Championships was held on 18–19 May in Uzhhorod at Avanhard Stadium.
- 2019 Ukrainian 10,000 Metres Championships was held on 25 May in Melitopol at Spartak Stadium. The national team for the 2019 European 10,000m Cup was selected at the competition.

==== Men ====
Events	Gold		Silver		Bronze	
Discus throw (winter)	Mykyta Nesterenko	60.45	Ivan Panasyuk	53.17 SB	Vladyslav Chernikov	47.25
Hammer throw (winter)	Serhiy Reheda	72.03 SB	Serhiy Perevoznikov	69.71 SB	Volodymyr Myslyvchuk	67.05 SB
Javelin throw (winter)	Oleksandr Nychyporchuk	72.26 SB	Mykola Shama	70.74 SB	Mykola Kalyush	70.11
4 × 100 metres relay	Chernivtsi Oblast; Maksym Kuzin; Emil Ibrahimov; Oleksandr Pomohayev; Oleksandr Danilov	41.43	Sumy Oblast; Andriy Volynets; Yuriy Storozh; Volodymyr Suprun; Mykhaylo Tyutyunnykov	42.20	Mykolaiv Oblast; Svyatoslav Chornyi; Valeriy Yuryk; Anatoliy Shcherbun; Andriy Vasylevskyi	42,30
4 × 400 metres relay	Sumy Oblast; Oleksandr Pohorilko; Fedir Savostyan; Kostyantyn Ozhiyov; Mykhaylo Tyutyunnykov	3:13.31	Zhytomyr Oblast; Dmytro Pantsyuk; Maksym Kostichev; Illya Chernyayev; Vasyl Koziy	3:24.09	Kirovohrad Oblast; Dmytro Bolyuk; Viktor Senchyshyn; Vladyslav Viter; Oleksandr Rozdobudko	3:29.40
4 × 800 metres relay	Kyiv Oblast; Oleksandr Honskyi; Dmytro Kovalchuk; Yuriy Kishchenko; Oleh Kayafa	7:38.16	Kirovohrad Oblast; Viktor Senchyshyn; Dmytro Bolyuk; Vladyslav Viter; Oleksandr Rozdobudko	8:03.68	Sumy Oblast; Kostyantyn Ozhiyov; Fedir Savostyan; Vitaliy Ivakh; Valeriy Buyan	8:11.95
10,000 metres	Bohdan-Ivan Horodyskyi	28:49.97	Mykola Nyzhnyk	28:50.71	Roman Romanenko	28:54.63

==== Women ====
Events	Gold		Silver		Bronze	
Discus throw (winter)	Viktoriya Klochko	54.86 SB	Viktoriya Savytska	49.50	Kateryna Nesterenko	44.60
Hammer throw (winter)	Iryna Klymets	71.21	Alyona Shamotina	64.70	Rimma Filimoshkina	62.51
Javelin throw (winter)	Hanna Hatsko-Fedusova	57.96	Tamara Yevdokymova	45.30	Olya Golembovska	42.56
4 × 100 metres relay	Sumy Oblast; Oksana Shkurat; Hanna Tsybulnyk; Daryna Maslyuk; Anastasiya Shyshnyak	48.16	Vinnytsia Oblast; Inna Kovtun; Yuliya Chekhivska; Hanna Tymchenko; Mariya Cherkas	49.00	Zhytomyr Oblast; Vasylyna Dombrovska; Mariya Chorna; Oleksandra Silina; Yuliya Sukhotska	49.21
4 × 400 metres relay	Vinnytsia Oblast; Inna Kovtun; Tetyana Doroshenko; Mariya Cherkas; Yuliya Chekhivska	3:49.89	Zhytomyr Oblast; Vasylyna Dombrovska; Mariya Chorna; Oleksandra Silina; Yuliya Sukhotska	4:01.40	Sumy Oblast; Alina Tytarenko; Daryna Maslyuk; Oksana Shkurat; Yana Tymoshenko	4:19.75
4 × 800 metres relay	Vinnytsia Oblast; Olena Lavrenyuk; Olha Melnychuk; Yuliya Turlyuk; Tetyana Doroshenko	9:36.83	Sumy Oblast; Tetyana Holovchenko; Veronika Kalashnikova; Yana Tymoshenko; Mariya Radko	10:26.18	not awarded	
10,000 metres	Darya Mykhaylova	32:44.70	Valeriya Zinenko	33:20.70	Olha Kotovska	33:20.80

==== Mixed ====
Events	Gold		Silver		Bronze	
4 × 400 metres relay	Sumy Oblast; Anastasiya Shyshnyak; Yevheniya Mucharova; Kostyantyn Ozhiyov; Mykhaylo Tyutyunnykov	3:33.29	Vinnytsia Oblast; Inna Kovtun; Yuliya Chekhivska; Andriy Kovalchuk; Oleksandr Nedosnovanyi	3:34.41	Zhytomyr Oblast; Mariya Chorna; Vasyl Koziy; Yuliya Sukhotska; Maksym Kostichev	3:39.35

=== Road race walk ===
- 2019 Ukrainian Winter Race Walking Championships was held on 23–24 March in Ivano-Frankivsk. It was the key competition for selection of the national team for the European Race Walking Cup.
- 2019 Ukrainian 20 Kilometres Race Walk Championships was held on 16 June in Sumy.
- 2019 Ukrainian 50 Kilometres Race Walk Championships was held on 19 October in Ivano-Frankivsk.

==== Men ====
Events	Gold		Silver		Bronze	
20 kilometres race walk (winter)	Ivan Losev	1:21:50	Eduard Zabuzhenko	1:22:16	Viktor Shumik	1:24:13
20 kilometres race walk	Aliaksandr Liakhovich (BLR)	1:24:27 SB	Serhiy Budza	1:24:45 SB	Serhiy Svitlychnyi	1:24:50 PB
35 kilometers race walk (winter)	Serhiy Budza	2:34:49	Ivan Banzeruk	2:36:09	Oleksiy Kazanin	2:39:58
50 kilometres race walk	Alex Wright (IRL)	3:51:13 SB	Ihor Hlavan	3:52:13 SB	Anton Radko	3:56:36 PB

==== Women ====
Events	Gold		Silver		Bronze	
20 kilometres race walk (winter)	Inna Kashyna	1:32:17	Mariya Filyuk	1:34:06	Hanna Shevchuk	1:35:38
20 kilometres race walk	Mariya Filyuk	1:35:39	Khrystyna Yudkina	1:36:25 SB	Hanna Shevchuk	1:39:19
35 kilometers race walk (winter)	Olena Sobchuk	2:54.23	Valentyna Myronchuk	3:04:15	Marianna Honcharova	3:07:23
50 kilometres race walk	Lyudmyla Shelest	4:58:25	Yuliya Kushka	5:34:24 SB	not awarded	

=== Trail, mountain and cross country running ===
- 2019 Ukrainian Trail Running Championships was held on 6 April in Vyzhnytsia. The running distance was 54.5 km long with 3,250 m elevation gain.
- 2019 Ukrainian Mountain Running Championships (uphill) was held on 2 June in Volovets. The running distance was 12 km long with 1,200 m elevation gain.
- 2019 Ukrainian Mountain Running Championships (uphill-downhill) was held on 9 June in Mukachevo. The running distance was 12 km (with height difference of 650 m) for men and 8 km (with height difference of 400 m) for women. The winners secured the right to participate in European and world mountain running championships.
- 2019 Ukrainian Mountain Running Championships (long distance) was held on 16 June in Skole as a part of the annual 'Skole Ultra Trail' mountain running competition. The running distance was 52.6 km long with height difference of 2,300 m.
- 2019 Ukrainian Cross Country Running Championships was held on 30–31 October in Uzhhorod.

==== Men ====
Events	Gold		Silver		Bronze	
Trail running	Serhiy Popov	6:21:57	Andriy Tkachuk	6:40:42	Oleksiy Borysenko	6:48:53
Mountain running (uphill)	Serhiy Rashchupkin	1:11:45	Oleksandr Chenikalo	1:12:10	Bohdan Dobranskyi	1:14:52
Mountain running (uphill-downhill)	Oleksandr Chenikalo	50:40	Anatoliy Bondarenko	51:30	Bohdan Dobranskyi	52:54
Mountain running (long distance)	Serhiy Popov	5:34:20	Anatoliy Bondarenko	5:38:00	Ihor Slyusarenko	5:42:29
Cross country running 2 km	Yuriy Kishchenko	5:41	Oleh Kayafa	5:42	Roman Rostykus	5:44
Cross country running 10 km	Ivan Strebkov	30:57	Bohdan Ivan-Horodyskyi	30:59	Dmytro Siruk	31:03

==== Women ====
Events	Gold		Silver		Bronze	
Trail running	Yuliya Tarasova	7:16:02	Nataliya Husynina	8:09:50	Alyona Khashko	8:30:30
Mountain running (uphill)	Kateryna Karmanenko	1:30:12	Olena Kytytsia	1:30:15	Yuliya Tarasova	1:32:00
Mountain running (uphill-downhill)	Olena Kytytsia	38:49	Olha Balabanova	41:59	Viktoriya Podlisetska	42:07
Mountain running (long distance)	Nataliya Husynina	7:21:39	Alyona Khashko	7:23:54	Alisa Dikhtenko	7:40:06
Cross country running 2 km	Valentyna Kilyarska	6:27	Olesya Didovodyuk	6:30	Orysya Demyanyuk	6:36
Cross country running 8 km	Victoriya Khapilina	27:29	Iryna Bubnyak	27:42	Darya Mykhaylova	27:47

=== Road running ===
- 2019 Ukrainian One Mile Run Championships was held on 29 September in Chernivtsi.
- 2019 Ukrainian 10 Kilometres Run Championships was held on 15 September in Lviv.
- 2019 Ukrainian Half Marathon Championships was held on 1 September in Poltava.
- 2019 Ukrainian Marathon Championships was held on 6 October in Bila Tserkva.
- 2019 Ukrainian 12-Hour and 24-Hour Run Championships was held on 21–22 September in Kyiv.
- 2019 Ukrainian 48-Hour Run Championships was held on 28–30 June in Vinnytsia.

==== Men ====
Events	Gold		Silver		Bronze	
Mile	Volodymyr Kyts	4:40	Vasyl Koval	4:41	Serhiy Berezyuk	4:43
10 kilometres	Dmytro Siruk	29:58	Vasyl Koval	30:04	Dmytro Musiyatchenko	30:11
Half marathon	Ihor Olefirenko	1:04:42	Oleksandr Sitkovskyy	1:04:56	Artem Kazban	1:05:10
Marathon	Bohdan-Ivan Horodyskyi	2:10:52 PB	Mykola Nyzhnyk	2:11:12 PB	Ihor Heletiy	2:13:15 PB
12-hour run	Anatoliy Novak	125.413 km	Yuriy Chernoshey (BLR)	116.472 km	Serhiy Hotsulyak	114.724 km
24-hour run	Andriy Tkachuk	240.548 km	Dmytro Krasnov	192.005 km	Yuriy Trostenyuk	188.296 km
48-hour run	Andriy Tkachuk	360.829 km	Dmytro Krasnov	295.717 km	Serhiy Yan	279.439 km

==== Women ====
Events	Gold		Silver		Bronze	
Mile	Diana Tkachenko	5:31	Lyudmyla Danylina	5:36	Ivanna Kukh	5:38
10 kilometres	Sofiya Yaremchuk	33:20	Olha Kotovska	33:27	Olesya Didovodyuk	34:38
Half marathon	Darya Mykhaylova	1:15:44	Vira Ovcharuk	1:16:20	Kateryna Karmanenko	1:17:01
Marathon	Yevheniya Prokofyeva	2:28:06 PB	Darya Mykhaylova	2:28:15 PB	Iryna Bubnyak	2:30:51 PB
12-hour run	Nataliya Chislina	90.407 km	Olha Akimova	75.568 km	Tetyana Artemenko	46.666 km
24-hour run	Olena Shevchenko	219.289 km NB	Lyudmyla Oliynyk	181.385 km	Olena Mykhaylyk	164.761 km
48-hour run	Svitlana Samarina	230.605 km	Larysa Labartkava	196.692 km	Halyna Kravchenko	174.988 km

== See also ==
- 2019 Ukrainian Athletics Indoor Championships
