= 2021 Ukrainian Athletics Championships =

- Dates: 18–20 June
- Host city: Lutsk, Ukraine
- Venue: Avanhard Stadium
- Level: Senior
- Type: Outdoor

The 2021 Ukrainian Athletics Championships was the national championship in outdoor track and field for athletes in Ukraine. It was held between 18 and 20 June at the Avanhard Stadium in Lutsk.

== Results ==
=== Men ===
Event	Gold		Silver		Bronze	
100 metres	Oleksandr Sokolov	10.45	Andrii Vasyliev	10.51 PB	Stanislav Kovalenko	10.52
200 metres	Serhiy Smelyk	20.94	Erik Kostrytsia	21.08	Dmytro Hladkyi	21.50
400 metres	Oleksandr Pohorilko	46.19 PB	Mykyta Barabanov	46.86 PB	Danylo Danylenko	46.94
800 metres	Yevhen Hutsol	1:47.83	Vladyslav Finchuk	1:48.03	Yevhen Kuznietsov	1:48.94 PB
1500 metres	Yurii Kishchenko	3:46.51	Oleh Kaiafa	3:47.31	Vladyslav Kovalenko	3:47.98
5000 metres	Vasyl Koval	14:04.60	Ivan Strebkov	14:11.06	Ihor Porozov	14:22.78
110 metres hurdles	Bohdan Chornomaz	14.19	Artem Shamatryn	14.25	Viktor Solianov	14.26
400 metres hurdles	Dmytro Romaniuk	49.90 PB	Denys Nechyporenko	50.77	Rostyslav Holubovych	52.98 PB
3000 metres steeplechase	Roman Rostykus	9:08.20	Vasyl Koval	9:11.97	Vladyslav Kavetskyi	9:34.06
High jump	Andriy Protsenko	2.26	Dmytro Yakovenko	2.23	Oleh Doroshchuk	2.23
Pole vault	Ivan Yeriomin	5.40	Kyrylo Kiru	5.20	Oleksandr Onufriiev	5.10
Long jump	Vladyslav Mazur	7.94	Serhiy Nykyforov	7.91	Yaroslav Isachenkov	7.66
Triple jump	Vladyslav Shepeliev	16.29 PB	Maksym Vanyaikin	16.19	Artem Konovalenko	15.65
Shot put	Ihor Musiyenko	19.15	Roman Kokoshko	18.68	Viktor Samoliuk	18.36
Discus throw	Mykyta Nesterenko	64.91	Ruslan Valitov	59.32 PB	Vitalii Rymaruk	47.74
Hammer throw	Mykhaylo Kokhan	78.61 PB	Ivan Tsikhan (BLR)	76.63	Mykhailo Havryliuk	75.11
Javelin throw	Oleksandr Nechyporchuk	73.78	Mykola Kaliush	66.32	Borys Halushko	52.67 PB
4 × 100 metres relay	Davyd Yanovskyi; Maksym Kuzin; Oleksandr Pomohaiev; Maksym Makoviichuk	41.14	Vasyl Makukh; Danylo Shamatrin; Vladyslav Chepurnyi; Artem Shamatryn	41.62	Oleksiy Ovcharenko; Ruslan Malohlovets; Viktor Holubiev; Yaroslav Isachenkov	41.95
4 × 400 metres relay	Yevhen Shvets; Andriy Nechyporenko; Yaroslav Demchenko; Oleksandr Pohorilko	3:12.52	Vladyslav Novak; Yaroslav Holub; Oleksiy Hodunko; Roman Dolhushyn	3:17.22	Denys Baranov; Yurii Vasichkin; Oleksandr Okhrimchuk; Nikita Rodchenkov	3:17.62

=== Women ===
Event	Gold		Silver		Bronze	
100 metres	Viktoriya Ratnikova	11.67	Yeva Podhorodetska	12.04	Hanna Chubkovtsova	12.05
200 metres	Nataliia Yurchuk	24.11 PB	Viktoriya Ratnikova	24.17	Olena Radiuk-Kiuchuk	24.57
400 metres	Anna Ryzhykova	51.21	Kateryna Klymyuk	51.89	Alina Lohvynenko	52.60
800 metres	Svitlana Zhulzhyk	2:05.70	Anastasiia Riemien	2:06.34	Tetiana Petlyuk	2:06.90
1500 metres	Orysya Demianiuk	4:17.50	Anna Mishchenko	4:18.02	Anastasiia Prokudina	4:31.77
5000 metres	Olesya Didovodiuk	16:38.13	Anna Mishchenko	16:47.14 PB	Maryna Nemchenko	17:06.12
100 metres hurdles	Hanna Chubkovtsova	13.56	Hanna Plotitsyna	13.64	Nataliia Yurchuk	13.69
400 metres hurdles	Viktoriya Tkachuk	54.60 =PB	Mariya Mykolenko	57.29	Tetyana Bezshyyko	58.91
3000 metres steeplechase	Nataliya Strebkova	9:39.08	Viktoriya Dutkevych	10:35.87 PB	Hanna Zhmurko	10:44.74
High jump	Yaroslava Mahuchikh	2.00	Iryna Geraschenko	1.96	Oksana Okuneva	1.94
Pole vault	Maryna Kylypko	4.70 NR	Yana Hladiychuk	4.30	Yuliya Kozub	4.20 =PB
Long jump	Maryna Bekh-Romanchuk	6.76	Iryna Nerubalshchuk	6.46	Oksana Martynova	6.35
Triple jump	Tetyana Ptashkina	13.65	Mariya Siney	13.49 PB	Inna Sydorenko	13.10
Shot put	Olga Golodna	17.14	Tetyana Kravchenko	15.22	Svitlana Marusenko	14.66
Discus throw	Natalya Semenova	56.84	Daria Harkusha	47.31	Valeriya Deykun	45.97
Hammer throw	Iryna Klymets	69.00	Alona Shut	65.32	Iryna Novozhylova	60.84
Javelin throw	Hanna Hatsko	57.10	Tetyana Nychyporchuk	55.50	Alina Shukh	53.53
4 × 100 metres relay	Mariya Mokrova; Ivanna Avramchuk; Nataliia Yurchuk; Hanna Chubkovtsova	46.70	Iryna Nerubalshchuk; Iryna Butenko; Zhanna Yarushevska; Yeva Podhorodetska	47.29	Anna Melnyk; Alina Bohdanova; Anna Tsybulnyk; Daryna Maslyuk	47.71
4 × 400 metres relay	Yuliya Hryhoryeva; Orysya Demianiuk; Ulyana Rachynska; Maryana Shostak	3:50.19	Anna Melnyk; Yevheniya Mucharova; Daryna Maslyuk; Anna Tsybulnyk	3:50.76	Oleksandra Rudenko; Maryna Chorna; Daria Zhdaniuk; Alisa Matviyenko	4:02.29
