= 2019 Ukrainian Athletics Indoor Championships =

- Dates: 7-9 February
- Host city: Sumy
- Venue: Sumy State University's; Athletics Indoor Arena
- Level: Senior
- Type: Indoor
- Events: 30
- Participation: 473 athletes from 3 nations

2019 Ukrainian Athletics Indoor Championships among the athletes of the senior age category were held from 7 to 9 February in Sumy at the Athletics Indoor Arena of Sumy State University.

== Medalists ==
=== Men ===
| Events | Gold | | Silver | | Bronze | |
|---|---|---|---|---|---|---|
| 60 metres | Oleksandr Sokolov | 6.68 PB | Vasyl Makukh | 6.79 | Kayhan Özer (TUR) | 6.81 |
| 200 metres | Stanislav Kovalenko | 21.88 PB | Kyrylo Prykhodko | 22.08 PB | Danylo Shamatryn | 22.27 =PB |
| 400 metres | Vitaliy Butrym | 47.16 SB | Danylo Danylenko | 47.46 | Oleksiy Pozdnyakov | 47.65 PB |
| 800 metres | Yevhen Hutsol | 1:49.00 PB | Oleh Myronets | 1:49.35 PB | Roman Fesenko | 1.51.12 PB |
| 1500 metres | Volodymyr Kyts | 3:56.89 SB | Yuriy Kishchenko | 3:56.96 | Andriy Aliksiychuk | 3:57.11 |
| 3000 metres | Volodymyr Kyts | 8:05.80 SB | Vasyl Koval | 8:14.86 SB | Artem Alfimov | 8:25.10 PB |
| 60 metres hurdles | Artem Shamatryn | 7.88 =SB | Bohdan Chornomaz | 7.91 | Maksat Kandymov | 7.92 PB |
| 3000 metres steeplechase | Vasyl Koval | 8:40.98 SB | Roman Rostykus | 9:06.35 SB | Kostyantyn Kolyada | 9:07.64 SB |
| 4 × 400 metres relay | Sumy Region; Vitaliy Butrym; Fedir Savostyan; Oleksandr Pohorilko; Mykhaylo Tyutyunnykov | 3:16.50 | Donetsk Region; Yevhen Vinnychuk; Andriy Aliksiychuk; Serhiy Kryvoshanov; Oleksiy Pozdnyakov | 3:19.08 | Kharkiv Region; Dmytro Bikulov; Viktor Holubev; Valentyn Diravka; Kyrylo Belashev | 3:19.41 |
| High jump | Andriy Protsenko | 2.30 | Vadym Kravchuk | 2.23 | Andriy Kovalyov | 2.20 |
| Pole vault | Illya Kravchenko | 5.40 PB | Kyrylo Kiru | 5.30 =PB | Ivan Yeryomin | 5.20 =SB |
| Long jump | Vladyslav Mazur | 7.80 SB | Serhiy Nykyforov | 7.73 SB | Yaroslav Isachenkov | 7.60 |
| Triple jump | Pavlo Beznis | 16.33 PB | Oleksandr Malosilov | 16.12 | Artem Konovalenko | 15.80 PB |
| Shot put | Ihor Musiyenko | 19.54 PB | Viktor Samolyuk | 19.49 PB | Roman Kokoshko | 18.82 |
| Heptathlon | Vasyl Ivanytskyi | 5863 | Ruslan Malohlovets | 5678 | Vadym Adamchuk | 5446 |

=== Women ===
| Events | Gold | | Silver | | Bronze | |
|---|---|---|---|---|---|---|
| 60 metres | Yana Kachur | 7.39 | Mariya Mokrova | 7.56 | Alina Kalistratova | 7.57 =SB |
| 200 metres | Olena Radyuk | 25.15 PB | Viktoriya Lunika | 25.81 SB | Yevheniya Mucharova | 26.02 PB |
| 400 metres | Tetyana Melnyk | 53.23 | Hanna Ryzhykova | 53.49 SB | Kateryna Klymiuk | 54.36 |
| 800 metres | Tetiana Petlyuk | 2:04.71 SB | Yuliya Chekhivska | 2:06.54 PB | Nataliya Pirozhenko-Chornomaz | 2:07.41 PB |
| 1500 metres | Orysya Demyanyuk | 4:32.67 | Viktoriya Shkurko | 4:35.07 | Lyudmyla Danilina | 4:37.13 SB |
| 3000 metres | Olha Lyakhova | 9:39.62 PB | Yuliya Moroz | 9:41.18 PB | Viktoriya Shkurko | 9:41.53 PB |
| 60 metres hurdles | Hanna Plotitsyna | 8.10 | Hanna Chubkovtsova | 8.23 | Nataliya Ruchkivska | 8.34 |
| 3000 metres steeplechase | Yaroslava Yastreb | 10:53.61 PB | Viktoriya Dutkevych | 11:03.34 PB | Lyubov Severyanova | 11:07.84 PB |
| 4 × 400 metres relay | Donetsk Region; Anastasiya Holeneva; Mariya Mykolenko; Olena Radyuk; Alina Lohvynenko | 3:44.88 | Vinnytsia Region; Yuliya Chekhivska; Tetyana Doroshenko; Inna Kovtun; Olena Kolesnichenko | 3:50.98 | Dnipropetrovsk Region; Yuliya Shapoval; Viktoriya Grynko; Viktoriya Kochmaryk; Daryna Stavnycha | 3:53.52 |
| High jump | Yuliya Levchenko | 1.97 | Iryna Herashchenko | 1.97 | Kateryna Tabashnyk | 1.97 |
| Pole vault | Maryna Kylypko | 4.50 SB | Yana Hladiychuk | 4.30 | Yuliya Maksymenko | 4.00 |
| Long jump | Maryna Bekh-Romanchuk | 6.85 PB | Yuliya Firsova | 6.26 PB | Oksana Martynova | 6.22 PB |
| Triple jump | Olha Saladukha | 14.15 | Hanna Krasutska | 13.90 | Olha Korsun | 13.57 PB |
| Shot put | Olha Holodna | 16.48 | Hanna Samoliuk | 15.56 SB | Svitlana Marusenko | 14.98 |
| Pentathlon | Alina Shukh | 4581 | Rymma Buinenko | 4265 | Iryna Rofe-Beketova | 4262 |

== Live stream ==
Ukrainian Athletics streamed all events live:

- Day 1 (morning session) on YouTube
- Day 1 (afternoon session) on YouTube
- Day 2 (morning session) on YouTube
- Day 2 (afternoon session) on YouTube
- Day 3 on YouTube

== See also ==
- 2019 Ukrainian Athletics Championships
