= 2020 Ukrainian Athletics Indoor Championships =

- Dates: 20-22 February
- Host city: Sumy
- Venue: Sumy State University's; Athletics Indoor Arena
- Level: Senior
- Type: Indoor
- Events: 30
- Participation: 513 athletes from 3 nations

2020 Ukrainian Athletics Indoor Championships among the athletes of the senior age category were held from 20 to 22 February in Sumy at the Athletics Indoor Arena of Sumy State University.

Yaroslava Mahuchikh jumped 2.01 m to win the national title.

== Medalists ==
=== Men ===
Events	Gold		Silver		Bronze	
60 metres	Eric Kostrytsya	6.69 PB	Dmytro Vitkovskyi	6.78 PB	Roman Kravtsov	6.86
200 metres	Kyrylo Prykhodko	21.65 PB	Oleksiy Pozdnyakov	21.71 PB	Stanislav Kovalenko	21.79 PB
400 metres	Ivan Budzynskyi	46.99	Oleksandr Pohorilko	47.78 PB	Danylo Danylenko	47.79 SB
800 metres	Yevhen Hutsol	1:49.52	Oleh Myronets	1:50.04 SB	Vladyslav Finchuk	1:50.27 PB
1500 metres	Oleh Kayafa	3:47.54 SB	Artem Alfimov	3:47.74 PB	Yuriy Kishchenko	3:50.99 SB
3000 metres	Volodymyr Kyts	8:07.20 SB	Oleksandr Karpenko	8:12.33 PB	Andriy Krakovetskyi	8:12.91 PB
60 metres hurdles	Victor Solyanov	7.95 PB	Oleksiy Ovcharenko	7.98	Andriy Vasylevskyi	8.00 PB
3000 metres steeplechase	Kostyantyn Kolyada	8:47.88 PB	Roman Rostykus	9:03.84 SB	Vladyslav Martynyuk	9:04.57 PB
4 × 400 metres relay	Sumy Region; Oleksiy Serhiyenko; Yevhen Shvets; Yaroslav Demchenko; Oleksandr Pohorilko	3:19.11	Donetsk Region; Danylo Zhuravov; Mykola Ovsyannykov; Vladyslav Kovalenko; Oleksiy Pozdnyakov	3:19.97	Dnipro Region; Serhiy Nazyma; Serhiy Kompaniyets; Dmytro Rudenko; Serhiy Drach	3:22.82
High jump	Andriy Kovalyov	2.27 SB	Vadym Kravchuk	2.24 PB	Dmytro Yakovenko	2.18
Pole vault	Yehor Abramov	5.30 PB	Ivan Yeryomin	5.20 PB	Artur Bortnikov Andriy Dybka	5.00
Long jump	Serhiy Nykyforov	7.89 SB	Vladyslav Mazur	7.88 PB	Oleh Hrebenyuk	7.60 PB
Triple jump	Oleksandr Malosilov	15.98	Yevhen Shevchenko	15.44 SB	Andriy Avramenko	15.35
Shot put	Ihor Musiyenko	20.00 PB	Victor Samolyuk	19.64 PB	Roman Kokoshko	18.38 SB
Heptathlon	Ruslan Malohlovets	5696	Vadym Adamchuk	5375	Yaroslav Bohdan	5278

=== Women ===
Events	Gold		Silver		Bronze	
60 metres	Victoriya Ratnikova	7.21 PB	Yana Kachur	7.39	Mariya Mokrova	7.53 SB
200 metres	Tetyana Kaysen	24.48	Elif Polat (TUR)	25.02 PB	Mariya Mokrova	25.06 PB
400 metres	Tetyana Melnyk	53.25	Nataliya Pyhyda	54.71	Tetyana Bezshyiko	55.12 PB
800 metres	Tetiana Petlyuk	2:06.03 SB	Svitlana Zhulzhyk	2:07.63	Anastasiya Ryemyen	2:08.85 SB
1500 metres	Orysya Demyanyuk	4:27.80 SB	Tetiana Petlyuk	4:28.70 SB	Victoriya Kovba	4:30.17 PB
3000 metres	Nataliya Strebkova	9:25.60 SB	Yuliya Moroz	9:26.24 PB	Fatma Arik (TUR)	9:28.09
60 metres hurdles	Hanna Plotitsyna	8.24	Hanna Chubkovtsova	8.28 SB	Nataliya Yurchuk	8.36
3000 metres steeplechase	Oksana Rayta	10:13.68 PB	Yaroslava Yastreb	10:14.35 PB	Hanna Zmurko	10:17.66 PB
4 × 400 metres relay	Donetsk Region; Olena Radyuk; Alina Lohvynenko; Mariya Mykolenko; Liliya Lobanova	3:48.35	Dnipro Region; Yuliya Shapoval; Dariya Stavnycha; Victoriya Hrynko; Hanna Orlova	3:51.83	Cherkasy Region; Yekateryna Artemenko; Tetyana Bezshyiko; Olena Vakulenko; Victoriya Nikolenko	3:57.41
High jump	Yaroslava Mahuchikh	2.01	Iryna Herashchenko	1.93	Yuliya Chumachenko	1.89
Pole vault	Yana Hladiychuk	4.40	Büşra Pekşirin (TUR)	3.90 SB	Yuliya Kozub	3.80 SB
Long jump	Oksana Martynova	6.40	Yuliya Firsova	6.30 PB	Darya Dikhanova	6.12 PB
Triple jump	Maryna Siney	13.13	Iryna Pimenova	12.95	Inna Sydorenko	12.80 PB
Shot put	Olha Holodna	17.29	Tetyana Kravchenko	16.12 PB	Svitlana Marusenko	15.12 SB
Pentathlon	Alina Shukh	4503	Daryna Sloboda	4393	Iryna Rofe-Beketova	4266

== Live stream ==
Ukrainian Athletics streamed all events live:

- Day 1 (morning session) on YouTube
- Day 1 (afternoon session) on YouTube
- Day 2 (morning session) on YouTube
- Day 2 (afternoon session) on YouTube
- Day 3 on YouTube

== See also ==
- 2020 Ukrainian Athletics Championships
