= Ukrainian Athletics Championships =

Annual track and field competition

- Sport: Track and field
- Founded: 1992
- Country: Ukraine

The Ukrainian Athletics Championships (Ukrainian: Чемпіонат України з легкої атлетики) is an annual outdoor track and field competition organised by the Ukrainian Athletic Federation, which serves as the national championship for the sport in Ukraine.

The event was first held in 1992, following the dissolution of the Soviet Union. It replaced the Soviet Athletics Championships as the national event for athletes from Ukraine. Separate annual championships are held for certain track (relays, 10,000 metres) and field (throwing) disciplines, cross country running, road running and racewalking events. There is also a Ukrainian Indoor Athletics Championships.

== Events ==
The competition programme features a total of 38 individual Ukrainian Championship athletics events, 19 for men and 19 for women. For each of the sexes, there are seven track running events, three obstacle events, four jumps, four throws, and one combined track and field event.

Track running

- 100 metres, 200 metres, 400 metres, 800 metres, 1500 metres, 5000 metres, 10,000 metres

Obstacle events

- 100 metres hurdles (women only), 110 metres hurdles (men only), 400 metres hurdles, 3000 metres steeplechase

Jumping events

- Pole vault, high jump, long jump, triple jump

Throwing events

- Shot put, discus throw, javelin throw, hammer throw

Combined events

- Decathlon (men only), Heptathlon (women only)

The women's programme expanded to match the men's within its first decade. The women's field events reached parity with the men's after the addition of the pole vault in 1996. The women's steeplechase appeared in 2000 metres steeplechase format in 1992 before taking the standard 3000 m distance in 2000. The 3000 metres was replaced by the 5000 m in 1995. A women's 10,000 metres race walk was held in the 1990s, but was later dropped.

== Editions ==
Ed.	Year	Location	Dates	Venue
1	1992	Kyiv	26–31 May	Olimpiyskyi National Sports Complex
2	1993	Kyiv	2–4 July	Olimpiyskyi National Sports Complex
3	1994	Kyiv	26–28 May	Olimpiyskyi National Sports Complex
4	1995	Kyiv	12–15 June	Olimpiyskyi National Sports Complex
5	1996	Kyiv	6–9 June	Olimpiyskyi National Sports Complex
6	1997	Kyiv	11–14 July	Olimpiyskyi National Sports Complex
7	1998	Kyiv	31 July–2 August	Olimpiyskyi National Sports Complex
8	1999	Kyiv	21–24 September	Olimpiyskyi National Sports Complex
9	2000	Kyiv	3–6 August	Olimpiyskyi National Sports Complex
10	2001	Kyiv	1–3 July	Olimpiyskyi National Sports Complex
11	2002	Donetsk	10–13 June	RSC Olimpiyskiy
12	2003	Kyiv	3–6 July	Olimpiyskyi National Sports Complex
13	2004	Yalta		Avanhard Stadium
14	2005	Kyiv		Olimpiyskyi National Sports Complex
15	2006	Kyiv		Olimpiyskyi National Sports Complex
16	2007	Donetsk	4–8 July	RSC Olimpiyskiy
17	2008	Kyiv	1–4 July	Olimpiyskyi National Sports Complex
18	2009	Yalta	22–23 July	Avanhard Stadium
19	2010	Donetsk	1–4 July	RSC Olimpiyskiy
20	2011	Donetsk	2–5 August	RSC Olimpiyskiy
21	2012	Yalta	12–15 June	Avanhard Stadium
22	2013	Donetsk	24–27 July	RSC Olimpiyskiy
23	2014	Kropyvnytskyi	24–26 July	Zirka Stadium
24	2015	Kropyvnytskyi	30 July–1 August	Zirka Stadium
25	2016	Lutsk	16–19 July	Avanhard Stadium
26	2017	Kropyvnytskyi	5–8 July	Zirka Stadium
27	2018	Lutsk	18–21 July	Avanhard Stadium
28	2019	Lutsk	21–23 August	Avanhard Stadium
29	2020	Lutsk	29-30 August	Avanhard Stadium
30	2021	Lutsk	18-20 June	Avanhard Stadium

== External sources ==
- Баранов Сергій, Качківський Іван. Чемпіонати та Кубки України з легкої атлетики. — 2018. — 46 p.
