= List of Ukrainian records in athletics =

Ukrainian records in athletics
- Country: Ukraine
- National governing body: Ukrainian Athletics
- Age category: Senior

Absolute records
- Men: 45 events
- Women: 46 events
- Oldest record: 56 years, 116 days Igor Shcherbak (One hour run)

Indoor records
- Men: 24 events
- Women: 24 events
- Oldest record: 45 years, 213 days Stepan Kuziv (50 metres hurdles)

Ukrainian records in athletics are the Ukrainian athletes' results which Ukrainian Athletics acknowledges to be the best in certain athletics events. The procedure for ratification of Ukrainian national records is largely based on the approach taken by IAAF in ratifying the world records and is set out in the Regulations for Ukrainian National Records in Athletics approved by the Council of the Ukrainian Athletics on 16 September 2017.

Ukrainian Athletics maintains national records in five age categories: under-16; under-18; under-20; under-23; senior. A record in each age category can be either absolute (i.e., achieved on an outdoor or indoor facility) or indoor.

The list of events, in which Ukrainian Athletics maintains national records, in principle conforms to those, in which IAAF and EAA ratify the world records and European records respectively, subject to the following distinctions:

- Unlike IAAF and EAA, Ukrainian Athletics ratifies:
  - absolute records in 35 kilometres road race walk
  - indoor records in a women's 5000 metres race walk and a men's 10,000 metres race walk
  - indoor records in 3000 metres steeplechase
- Ukrainian Athletics does not maintain national records in a mixed-gendered 4 × 400 metres relay

== Key to tables ==
Record awaiting ratification
National best performance in an event, in which Ukrainian Athletics does not ratify national records
Record annulled due to anti-doping violation
Statistically valid result not ratified by Ukrainian Athletics as national record

== Outdoor ==
=== Men ===
Event	Record	Athlete	Date	Meet	Place	Video	Ref.
Sprint running (track)
100 m (progression)	10.07 (±0.0 m/s)	Valeriy Borzov	31 August 1972	Olympic Games	Munich, West Germany		
150 m (bend)	15.35 (+0.9 m/s)	Sergii Smelyk	18 May 2023	Nationales Auffahrts-Meeting	Langenthal, Switzerland		
200 m	20.00 (±0.0 m/s)	Valeriy Borzov	4 September 1972	Olympic Games	Munich, West Germany	Video on YouTube	
300 m							
400 m	44.81	Oleksandr Pohorilko	27 June 2025	European Team Championships	Madrid, Spain		
Middle-distance running (track)
600 m	1:17.08	Yevhen Hutsol	5 May 2024	Internationales Läufermeeting	Pliezhausen, Germany		
800 m	1:45.08	Leonid Masunov	22 June 1984	All-Soviet Meet	Kyiv, Soviet Union		
1000 m	2:16.8h	Vitaliy Tyshchenko	11 June 1981		Kyiv, Soviet Union		
1500 m	3:30.33	Ivan Heshko	3 September 2004	Memorial Van Damme	Brussels, Belgium		
Mile	3:50.04	Ivan Heshko	30 July 2004	Norwich Union British Grand Prix	London, United Kingdom		
2000 m	5:03.91	Ivan Heshko	24 June 2000		Istanbul, Turkey		
2000 m steeplechase	5:27.89	Mykola Matyushenko	29 July 1989		Ostrava, Czechoslovakia		
3000 m	7:35.06	Serhiy Lebid	19 July 2002	Herculis	Fontvieille, Monaco		
3000 m steeplechase	8:21.75	Andriy Popelyayev	19 July 1984		Moscow, Soviet Union		
Two miles							
Long-distance running (track)
5000 m	13:10.78	Serhiy Lebid	6 September 2002	ISTAF Berlin	Berlin, Germany		
10,000 m	27:59.8h	Pavlo Andreyev	10 July 1973	Soviet Championships	Moscow, Soviet Union		
One hour	19,929 m+	Igor Shcherbak	30 May 1970		Moscow, Soviet Union		
20,000 m	1:00:11.8	Igor Shcherbak	30 May 1970		Moscow, Soviet Union		
Road running
Mile (road)	4:01.93	Dmytrii Nikolaichuk	6 September 2026	New Balance Kö Meile	Düsseldorf, Germany		
5 km	13:35	Serhiy Lebid	8 May 2004		Balmoral, United Kingdom		
10 km	27:58	Serhiy Lebid	30 December 2007	Corrida de Houilles	Houilles, France		
15 km	43:03+	Bohdan-Ivan Horodyskyi	17 October 2020	World Half Marathon Championships	Gdynia, Poland		
10 miles	48:07	Valeriy Chesak	11 September 1992		Navazzo, Italy		
20 km	57:40+	Bohdan-Ivan Horodyskyi	17 October 2020	World Half Marathon Championships	Gdynia, Poland		
Half marathon	1:00:40	Bohdan-Ivan Horodyskyi	17 October 2020	World Half Marathon Championships	Gdynia, Poland		
25 km	1:14:58+	Dmytro Baranovskyi	6 December 2009	Fukuoka Marathon	Fukuoka, Japan		
30 km	1:30:06+	Dmytro Baranovskyi	6 December 2009	Fukuoka Marathon	Fukuoka, Japan		
Marathon	2:07:15	Dmytro Baranovskyi	3 December 2006	Fukuoka Marathon	Fukuoka, Japan		
100 km	6:25:25	Serhiy Yanenko	13 September 1997	100 km World Championships	Winschoten, Netherlands		
24-hour run (road)	295.363 km	Andrii Tkachuk	28–29 August 2021	ABM Jedraszek UltraPark Weekend	Pabianice, Poland		
Hurdling (track)
110 m	13.22 (+1.7 m/s)	Serhiy Demydiuk	31 August 2007	World Championships	Osaka, Japan	Video on YouTube	
400 m	48.06	Oleh Tverdokhlib	10 August 1994	European Championships	Helsinki, Finland	Video on YouTube	
Jumping (field)
High jump	2.42 m	Bohdan Bondarenko	14 June 2014	Adidas Grand Prix	New York City, United States	Video on YouTube	
Pole vault	6.14 m A	Serhiy Bubka	31 July 1994	Sestriere Meeting	Sestriere, Italy	Video on YouTube	
Long jump	8.35 m (+2.0 m/s)	Serhiy Layevskyi	16 July 1988	Soviet Athletics Cup	Dnipropetrovsk, Soviet Union		
Long jump	8.35 m (+0.7 m/s)	Roman Shchurenko	25 July 2000	Olimpiyskiy NSC Cup	Kyiv, Ukraine		
Triple jump	17.90 m (+1.0 m/s)	Volodymyr Inozemtsev	20 June 1990		Bratislava, Czechoslovakia		
Throwing (field)
Shot put	21.81 m	Yuriy Bilonoh	3 July 2003	National Championships	Kyiv, Ukraine		
Discus throw	68.88 m	Volodymyr Zinchenko	16 July 1988	Soviet Athletics Cup	Dnipropetrovsk, Soviet Union		
Hammer throw	86.74 m	Yuriy Sedykh	30 August 1986	European Championships	Stuttgart, West Germany	Video on YouTube	
Javelin throw	86.12 m	Oleksandr Pyatnytsya	20 May 2012	All-Ukrainian Throwing Meet	Kyiv, Ukraine	Video on YouTube	
Combined Events (track/field)
Decathlon	8709 pts	Oleksandr Apaychev	2–3 June 1984	USSR-GDR Combined Events Meet	Neubrandenburg, East Germany		
Decathlon	100m (wind) / Long jump (wind) / Shot put / High jump / 400m / 110m H (wind) / Discus / Pole vault / Javelin / 1500m; 10.96 / 7.57 m / 16.00 m / 1.97 m / 48.72 / 13.93 / 48.00 m / 4.90 m / 72.24 m / 4:26.51						
Racewalking (track/road)
10,000 m (track)	38:41.17	Andriy Yurin	22 June 2005	Olimpiyskiy NSC Race Walking Cup	Kyiv, Ukraine		
10 km (road)	38:50	Ruslan Dmytrenko	30 August 2014	Voronovo Cup	Moscow, Russia		
20,000 m (track)	1:21:47.0	Mykola Vynnychenko	6 September 1980	Soviet Championships	Donetsk, Soviet Union		
20 km (road)	1:18:37	Ruslan Dmytrenko	4 May 2014	IAAF World Race Walking Cup	Taicang, China	Video on YouTube	
Half marathon walk (road)	1:24:12	Mukola Rushchak	15 August 2026	European Championships	Birmingham, United Kingdom		
30,000 m (track)	2:08:16.0	Mykola Udovenko	5 October 1979		Kyiv, Soviet Union		
30 km (road)	2:05:17	Vitaliy Popovych	19 February 1989		Sochi, Soviet Union		
35 km (road)							
Marathon walk (road)	3:04:38	Maryan Zakalnytskyy	15 August 2026	European Championships	Birmingham, United Kingdom		
50,000 m (track)	3:46:11.0	Mykola Udovenko	3 October 1980		Uzhgorod, Soviet Union		
50 km (road)	3:40:39	Ihor Hlavan	14 August 2013	World Championships	Moscow, Russia		
Relays (track)
4 × 100 m	38.51 A	Ukraine; Erik Kostrytsya; Andriy Vasylyev; Kyrylo Prykhodko; Serhiy Smelyk	12 June 2021	International Sprint & Relay Cup	Erzurum, Turkey		
4 × 200 m	1:21.32	Ukraine; Dmitro Vanyayikin; Oleh Tverdokhlib; Ihor Streltsov; Vladyslav Dolohodin	5 June 1993	Pearl European Relays	Portsmouth, United Kingdom		
4 × 400 m	3:02.35	Ukraine; Oleksandr Kaydash; Andriy Tverdostup; Volodymyr Rybalka; Yevhen Zyukov	11 August 2001	World Championships	Edmonton, Canada		
4 × 800 m	7:13.1h	Ukrainian SSR; Valeriy Liskov; Serhiy Shapovalov; Vitaliy Tyshchenko; Anatoliy Reshetnyak	25 July 1979	Soviet Spartakiad	Moscow, Soviet Union		

=== Women ===
Event	Record	Athlete	Date	Meet	Place	Video	Ref.
Sprint running (track)
100 m	10.82 (−0.3 m/s)	Zhanna Pintusevych	6 August 2001	World Championships	Edmonton, Canada		
150 m (bend)	16.73 (+2.0 m/s)	Mariya Ryemyen	31 August 2013	Amsterdam Open & Flame Games	Amsterdam, Netherlands		
200 m	22.17 (−2.3 m/s)	Zhanna Pintusevych	9 July 1997		Monachil, Spain		
300 m	35.01+	Olha Vladykina	6 October 1985	IAAF World Cup	Canberra, Australia	Video on YouTube	
400 m	48.27	Olha Vladykina	6 October 1985	IAAF World Cup	Canberra, Australia	Video on YouTube	
Middle-distance running (track)
600 m							
800 m	1:53.43	Nadiya Olizarenko	27 July 1980	Olympic Games	Moscow, Soviet Union	Video on YouTube	
1000 m	2:34.81	Olena Buzhenko	17 July 1999		Nice, France		
1500 m	3:56.63	Nadiya Ralldugina	18 August 1984	Friendship Games	Prague, Czechoslovakia		
Mile	4:25.32	Iryna Lishchynska	7 September 2008	Rieti Meeting	Rieti, Italy		
2000 m steeplechase	6:21.16	Lyudmyla Pushkina	24 June 1992		Moscow, Russia		
3000 m	8:26.53	Tetyana Samolenko	25 September 1988	Olympic Games	Seoul, South Korea		
3000 m steeplechase	9:27.26	Valentyna Horpynych	7 June 2008	National Cup	Yalta, Ukraine		
Two miles							
Long-distance running (track)
5000 m	14:59.26	Nataliya Berkut	12 June 2004	Vladimir Kuts Memorial	Moscow, Russia		
10,000 m	31:08.89	Nataliya Berkut	25 June 2004		Tula, Russia		
Road running
5 km (women only)	15:14	Nataliya Berkut	5 June 2004	Neuss Soomernachtslauf	Neuss, Germany		
10 km (mixed)	31:14	Nataliya Berkut	21 May 2006	BUPA Great Run	Manchester, United Kingdom		
10 km (women only)	32:26	Olena Vyazova	29 May 1993	Berliner Frauenlauf	Berlin, Germany		
15 km	49:53	Nataliya Berkut	9 July 2006		Utica, United States		
10 miles	53:37	Olena Vyazova	22 September 1996	Dam tot Damloop	Zaandam, Netherlands		
20 km	1:05:42	Nataliya Berkut	8 October 2006	IAAF World Road Running Championships	Debrecen, Hungary		
Half marathon (mixed)	1:09:34	Olena Vyazova	29 September 1996	Route du Vin Half Marathon	Remich, Luxembourg		
Half marathon (women only)	1:10:32	Yevheniya Prokofyeva	17 October 2020	World Half Marathon Championships	Gdynia, Poland		
25 km	1:25:16+	Olena Shurhno	30 September 2012	Berlin Marathon	Berlin, Germany		
30 km	1:42:18+	Olena Shurhno	30 September 2012	Berlin Marathon	Berlin, Germany		
Marathon (women only)	2:23:32	Olena Shurhno	30 September 2012	Berlin Marathon	Berlin, Germany		
Marathon (women only)	2:22:09	Tetyana Hamera-Shmyrko	25 January 2015	Osaka International Ladies Marathon	Osaka, Japan		
24-hour run (road)	236.624 km	Viktoria Nikolaienko	28–29 August 2021	ABM Jedraszek UltraPark Weekend	Pabianice, Poland		
Ekiden	2:20:15	Ukraine; Svitlana Miroshnyk; Tamara Koba; Zoya Kaznovska; Iryna Yahodina; Tetyana Bilovol; Tetyana Pozdnyakova	16 April 1994	World Road Relay Championships	Litochoro, Greece		
100 km	7:56:33	Mariya Ostrovska	8 October 1994	Kalisia	Kalisz, Poland		
Hurdling (track)
100 m	12.39 (+1.8 m/s)	Nataliya Grygoryeva	11 July 1991	Soviet Championships	Kyiv, Soviet Union		
300 m hurdles	38.24	Viktoriya Tkachuk	31 May 2022	Golden Spike Ostrava	Ostrava, Czech Republic		
400 m	52.96	Anna Ryzhykova	4 July 2021	BAUHAUS-galan	Stockholm, Sweden		
Jumping (field)
High jump	2.10 m	Yaroslava Mahuchikh	7 July 2024	Meeting de Paris	Paris, France		
Pole vault	4.65 m	Maryna Kylypko	3 September 2016		Trani, Italy		
Long jump	7.24 m (+1.0 m/s)	Larysa Berezhna	5 June 1991		Granada, Spain		
Long jump	7.37 m	Inessa Kravets	13 June 1992		Kyiv, Ukraine		
Long jump	7.27 m	Inessa Kravets	22 May 1988		Kyiv, Soviet Union		
Triple jump	15.50 m (+0.9 m/s)	Inessa Kravets	10 August 1995	World Championships	Gothenburg, Sweden	Video on YouTube	
Throwing (field)
Shot put	21.69 m	Vita Pavlysh	20 August 1998	European Championships	Budapest, Hungary		
Discus throw	70.80 m	Larysa Mykhalchenko	18 June 1988		Kharkiv, Soviet Union		
Hammer throw	74.52 m	Iryna Sekachova	2 July 2008	National Championships	Kyiv, Ukraine		
Javelin throw	67.29 m	Hanna Hatsko-Fedusova	26 July 2014	National Championships	Kirovohrad, Ukraine		
Combined Events (track/field)
Heptathlon	6832 pts	Lyudmyla Blonska	25–26 August 2007	World Championships	Osaka, Japan		
Heptathlon	100m H (wind) / High jump / Shot put / 200m (wind) / Long jump (wind) / Javelin / 800m; 13.25 (+0.1 m/s) / 1.92 m / 14.44 m / 24.09 (+0.3 m/s) / 6.88 m (+1.0 m/s) / 47.77 m / 2:16.68						
Racewalking (track/road)
Mile walk	6:10.09	Lyudmila Olyanovska	1 July 2026	Raiffeisen Austrian Open	Eisenstadt, Austria		
5000 m (track)	20:15.71	Lyudmyla Olyanovska	4 June 2014		Kyiv, Ukraine		
5 km (road)	21:26	Kateryna Samoylenko	15 August 1992		Groß-Gerau, Germany		
10,000 m (track)	41:42.5h	Lyudmyla Olyanovska	1 November 2014	National Race Walking Cup	Mukachevo, Ukraine		
10 km (road)	42:30	Lyudmyla Olyanovska	30 August 2014		Moscow, Russia		
20 km (road)	1:27:09	Lyudmyla Olyanovska	17 May 2015	European Race Walking Cup	Murcia, Spain		
Half marathon walk (road)	1:31:07	Lyudmila Olyanovska	15 August 2026	European Championships	Birmingham, United Kingdom		
35 km (road)	2:42:41	Hanna Shevchuk	18 May 2025	European Race Walking Team Championships	Poděbrady, Czech Republic		
50 km (road)	4:15:50	Valentyna Myronchuk	19 May 2019	European Race Walking Cup	Alytus, Lithuania		
50 km (road)	4:12:44 X (Note: subsequently annulled for doping)	Alina Tsviliy	7 August 2018	European Championships	Berlin, Germany		
Relays (track)
4 × 100 m	42.04	Ukraine; Olesya Povh; Hrystyna Stuy; Mariya Ryemyen; Yelizaveta Bryzgina	10 August 2012	Olympic Games	London, United Kingdom	Video on YouTube	
4 × 200 m	1:30.74	Ukrainian SSR; Raisa Makhova; Nina Zyuskova; Tetyana Prorochenko; Mariya Kulchunova	29 July 1979	Soviet Spartakiad	Moscow, Soviet Union		
4 × 400 m	3:21.94	Ukrainian SSR; Lyudmyla Dzhyhalova; Nadiya Olizarenko; Mariya Pinigina; Olha Vladykina	17 July 1986	Soviet Championships	Kyiv, Soviet Union		
4 × 800 m	7:56.6h	Ukrainian SSR; Lyubov Smolka; Lyudmyla Shesterova; Svitlana Popova; Tamara Koba	9 September 1980		Donetsk, Soviet Union		

=== Mixed ===
Event	Record	Athlete	Date	Meet	Place	Ref.
4 × 400 m	3:14.06 A	Ukraine Oleksandr Pohorilko	27 June 2021		Erzurum, Turkey	

== Indoor ==
=== Men ===
Event	Record	Athlete	Date	Meet	Place	Video	Ref.
Sprint running
50 m	5.71	Serhiy Osovych	7 February 1996	World Class in Moscow	Moscow, Russia		
60 m	6.54	Kostyantyn Rurak	29 January 2004	National Indoor Cup	Zaporizhia, Ukraine		
200 m	20.40	Serhiy Osovych	1 March 1998	European Championships	Valencia, Spain		
300 m	33.47	Dmytro Ostrovskyi	18 February 2011		Lieven, France		
400 m	46.32	Oleksandr Pohorilko	7 March 2025	European Championships	Apeldoorn, Netherlands		
Middle-distance running
500 m	1:03.86	Myhaylo Knysh	25 February 2014	Prague Indoor	Prague, Czech Republic		
600 m	1:18.40	Oleksandr Osmolovych	3 February 2013	Russian Winter Meeting	Moscow, Russia		
800 m	1:46.49	Ivan Heshko	20 February 2005	Athina 2005	Athens, Greece		
1000 m	2:20.97	Anatoliy Legeda	14 February 1987	Soviet Indoor Cup	Moscow, Soviet Union		
1500 m	3:33.99	Ivan Heshko	13 February 2005	LBBW-Meeting	Karlsruhe, Germany		
Mile	3:59.14	Ivan Heshko	27 January 2007	Reebok Indoor Games	Boston, United States		
2000 m steeplechase	5:24.49	Mykola Matyushenko	6 February 1986	Soviet Championships	Moscow, Soviet Union		
3000 m	7:41.01	Serhiy Lebid	22 February 2004	Athina 2004	Athens, Greece		
3000 m steeplechase	8:17.46	Oleksandr Zahoruyko	21 February 1982	Soviet Championships	Moscow, Soviet Union		
Two miles	8:21.57	Serhiy Lebid	18 February 2001	Norwich Union Indoor Grand Prix	Birmingham, United Kingdom		
Long-distance running
5000 m	13:54.65	Oleksandr Burtsev	10 February 1991	Soviet Championships	Volgograd, Soviet Union		
Hurdling
50 m	6.58	Stepan Kuziv	22 February 1981	European Championships	Grenoble, France		
60 m	7.53	Volodymyr Bilokon	12 February 1994	Ukrainian Championships	Kyiv, Ukraine		
60 m	7.53	Serhiy Demydyuk	11 February 2007	BW-Bank Meeting	Karlsruhe, Germany		
Jumping
High jump	2.38 m	Hennadiy Avdyeyenko	7 March 1987	World Championships	Indianapolis, United States		
Pole vault	6.15 m	Serhiy Bubka	21 February 1993	Pole Vault Stars	Donetsk, Ukraine	Video on YouTube	
Long jump	8.33 m	Roman Shchurenko	16 February 2002	Ukrainian Championships	Brovary, Ukraine		
Triple jump	17.53 m	Volodymyr Inozemtsev	19 February 1991	GE Galan	Stockholm, Sweden		
Throwing
Shot put	21.84 m	Roman Kokoshko	3 March 2023	European Championships	Istanbul, Turkey		
Combined Events
Heptathlon	6254 pts	Oleksiy Kasyanov	30–31 January 2010	National Indoor Cup	Zaporizhia, Ukraine		
Heptathlon	60m / Long jump / Shot put / High jump / 60m H / Pole vault / 1000m; 6.85 / 8.04 m / 15.15 m / 2.05 m / 8.18 / 4.70 m / 2:42.88						
Racewalking
5000 m	18:21.76	Ruslan Dmytrenko	30 January 2014	Samara Region Indoor Cup	Samara, Russia		
10,000 m	39:06.06	Ihor Hlavan	24 December 2014		Sumy, Ukraine		
Relays
4 × 200 m							
4 × 400 m	3:07.54	Ukraine; Vitaliy Butrym; Yevhen Hutsol; Dmytro Bikulov; Danylo Danylenko	8 March 2014	World Championships	Sopot, Poland		
4 × 800 m							

=== Women ===
Event	Record	Athlete	Date	Meet	Place	Ref.
Sprint running
50 m	6.09	Zhanna Tarnopolska	2 February 1993		Moscow, Russia	
60 m	7.07	Zhanna Tarnopolska	11 February 1993		Madrid, Spain	
60 m	7.07	Anzhela Kravchenko	2 February 2000		Erfurt, Germany	
60 m	7.04	Zhanna Block	14 March 2003	World Championships	Birmingham, United Kingdom	
200 m	23.01	Iryna Slyusar	12 February 1986		Turin, Italy	
300 m	37.48	Tetyana Melnyk	13 February 2018	Meeting Pas de Calais	Lievin, France	
400 m	50.81	Olha Bryzgina	14 February 1987	Soviet Indoor Cup	Moscow, Soviet Union	
Middle-distance running
500 m						
600 m	1:25.68	Nadiya Olizarenko	25 February 1989		Moscow, Soviet Union	
800 m	1:57.23	Inna Yevseyeva	1 February 1992		Moscow, Russia	
1000 m	2:33.93	Inna Yevseyeva	7 February 1992		Moscow, Russia	
1500 m	4:07.08	Tetyana Samolenko	8 March 1987	World Championships	Indianapolis, France	
1500 m	4:06.78	Anzhelika Shevchenko	14 February 2012	Meeting Pas de Calais	Liévin, France	
Mile	4:28.46	Nadiya Ralldugina	10 March 1982		Milan, Italy	
2000 m steeplechase	6:19.50	Olha Stefanishina	18 January 1992		Kyiv, Ukraine	
3000 m	8:41.01	Svitlana Shmidt	18 February 2012	Ukrainian Championships	Sumy, Ukraine	
3000 m steeplechase	9:41.12	Valentyna Zhudina	16 February 2013	Ukrainian Championships	Sumy, Ukraine	
Two miles	9:51.31	Tetyana Mezentseva	17 February 2007	Aviva Indoor Grand Prix	Birmingham, United Kingdom	
Long-distance running
5000 m	15:57.49	Olena Vyazova	10 February 1991	Soviet Championships	Volgograd, Soviet Union	
Hurdling
50 m hurdles	6.82	Nadiya Bodrova	7 February 1996		Moscow, Russia	
60 m hurdles	7.85	Nataliya Grygoryeva	4 February 1990	Soviet Championships	Chelyabinsk, Soviet Union	
Jumping
High jump	2.06 m	Yaroslava Mahuchikh	2 February 2021	Banskobystricka latka	Banská Bystrica, Slovakia	
Pole vault	4.62 m	Maryna Kylypko	25 February 2018	All Star Perche	Clermont-Ferrand, France	
Long jump	7.20 m	Larysa Berezhna	4 February 1989	Soviet Championships	Gomel, Soviet Union	
Triple jump	14.88 m	Olha Saladuha	3 March 2013	European Championships	Gothenburg, Sweden	
Throwing
Shot put	21.06 m	Nunu Abashidze	8 February 1984		Budapest, Hungary	
Shot put	21.60 m	Valentyna Fedyushina	28 December 1991		Simferopol, Ukraine	
Combined Events
Pentathlon	5013 pts	Nataliya Dobrynska	9 March 2012	World Championships	Istanbul, Turkey	
Pentathlon	60m H / High jump / Shot put / Long jump / 800m; 8.38 / 1.84 m / 16.51 m / 6.57 m / 2:11.15					
Racewalking
3000 m	12:14.28	Natalya Serbinenko	3 February 1990	Soviet Championships	Chelyabinsk, Soviet Union	
5000 m	19:53.61	Lyudmyla Olyanovska	27 February 2026	Ukrainian Championships	Kyiv, Ukraine	
Relays
4 × 200 m						
4 × 400 m	3:30.38	Ukraine; Viktoriya Tkachuk; Anastasiia Bryzgina; Kateryna Klymyuk; Anna Ryzhykova	7 March 2021	European Championships	Toruń, Poland	
4 × 800 m	8:31.00	Ukraine; Anna Mishchenko; Anzhelika Shevchenko; Tamara Tverdostup; Zoya Hladun	31 January 2008	Gugl Indoor Meeting	Linz, Austria	
