= Ivan Strebkov =

Ivan Strebkov may refer to:

- Ivan Strebkov (basketball), Russian basketball player
- Ivan Strebkov (runner), Ukrainian runner
