= PlantIn =

App for plant identification and care

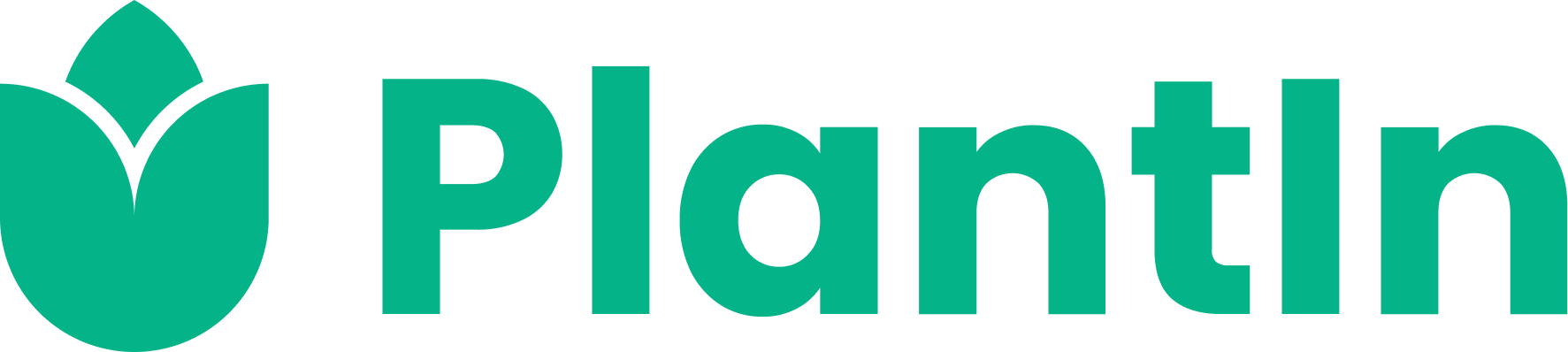
- Available in: 20 languages
- Founders: Mykhaylo Grynets, Dmytro Grynets
- Website: myplantin.com
- Users: 35 million total downloads (as of 2025)
- Launched: 2020

PlantIn is a mobile and web application for plant identification and care, developed in Ukraine by Mykhaylo and Dmytro Grynets in 2020. The service is part of the Genesis technology ecosystem. The app uses artificial intelligence and machine learning to identify plant and fungi species from photos and provides general care advice.

== History ==
PlantIn was launched in 2020 by brothers Mykhaylo and Dmytro Grynets. The first versions included basic information and reminders for watering and maintenance. Later, the app introduced photo-based plant identification powered by machine learning.

After early development, the project joined the Genesis ecosystem, a Ukrainian technology group that supports digital startups. The company also develops other products that use machine learning. In 2023, they launched a coin identification tool called CoinIn.

== Platforms ==
The first version of PlantIn was released for iOS devices in 2020. Currently, it's available in 20 languages. An Android version and a web platform were later introduced. The web and mobile versions provide similar functionality, including plant identification, condition analysis, and care tracking.

== Collaborations ==
In October 2023, the company became an official partner of the Ukrainian Athletic Federation (Ukrainian: Федерація легкої атлетики України, ФЛАУ). The collaboration focuses on infrastructure support, digital operations, and software development for training and competition management.

Between May and June 2025, it organized the Plant Hero Academy, a free educational series on plants and botany in partnership with Indoor Garden Market, Harden Garden, and Plant Cell Technology.

In December 2025, PlantIn created a new official website for the National Olympic Committee of Ukraine (Ukrainian: Національний олімпійський комітет України, НОК України). The project was carried out on a voluntary basis. It included changes to the site structure and the restoration of archived content dating back to 2000. Following the relaunch, the NOC of Ukraine's website received the Website of the Year for Sports Organization award at the SBC Ukraine Awards 2025, with PlantIn acknowledged as a project partner.
