= Mykolenko =

Mykolenko (Ukrainian: Миколенко) is a Ukrainian surname. Notable people with the surname include:

- Mariya Mykolenko (born 1994), Ukrainian athlete
- Vitalii Mykolenko (born 1999), Ukrainian footballer
