= Pidlissia =

Pidlissia may refer to the following places in Ukraine:

- Pilissia, in Tysmenytsia Raion, of Ivano-Frankivsk Oblast
- Pidlissia, Ternopil Oblast
- Polesie (Polissia), a region of Ukraine and Belarus

== See also ==
- Pidlyssia
