= Ihor Shcherbak =

Soviet long-distance runner

Personal information
- Native name: Ігор Олександрович Щербак
- Full name: Ihor Oleksandrovych Shcherbak
- National team: Soviet Union
- Citizenship: Soviet Union→Ukraine
- Born: 9 June 1943 Poltava, Soviet Ukraine, Soviet Union
- Died: 15 November 2002 (aged 59)

Sport
- Country: Soviet Union, Soviet Ukraine
- Sport: Track and field
- Long-distance running: 10000 m, one hour run, 20000 m, marathon

Achievements and titles
- Personal bests: 10000 m: 28:50.4h (1971); One hour run: 19,929 m (1970, NR); 20000 m: 1:00.11,8h (1970, NR); Marathon: 2:13.17 (1972)
Medal record
Soviet Championships
Silver medal – second place	1972 Tashkent	30 km (road)
Bronze medal – third place	1972 Novgorod	marathon

Ihor Oleksandrovych Shcherbak (Ukrainian: Ігор Олександрович Щербак; 9 June 1943 – 15 November 2002) was a Ukrainian middle-distance runner who represented Soviet Union in the marathon at the 1972 Summer Olympics.

Records
Preceded by Borys Sveshnykov	Men's One Hour Run Ukrainian Record Holder; 30 May 1970 – present	Incumbent
Preceded by Borys Sveshnykov	Men's 20000 metres Ukrainian Record Holder; 30 May 1970 – present	Incumbent
Preceded by Yuriy Volkov	Men's Marathon Ukrainian Indoor Record Holder; 28 April 1972 – 24 May 1980	Succeeded by Ivan Kovalchuk
