= Olena Shurkhno =

Ukrainian long-distance runner

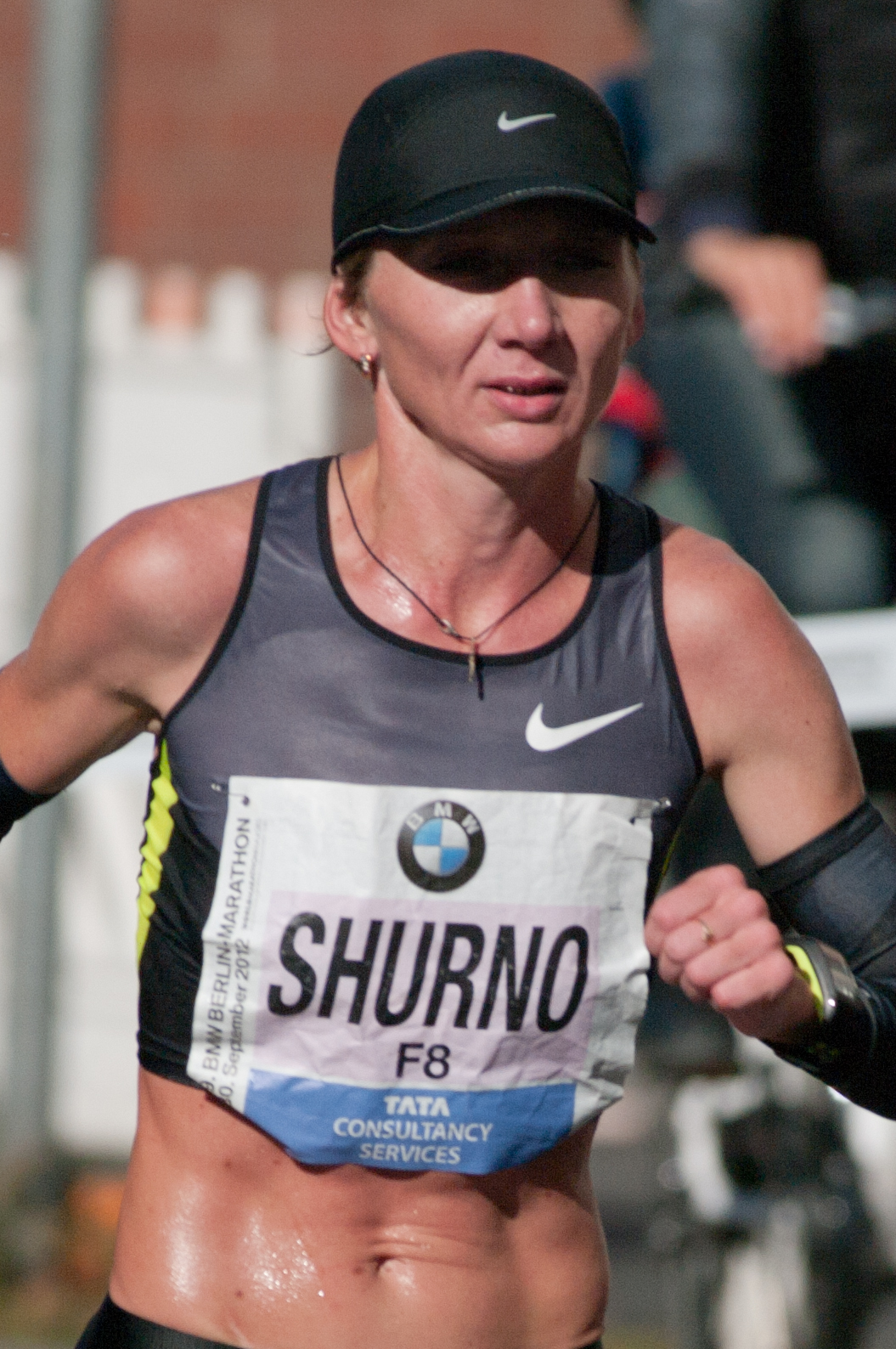
Shurkhno at the Berlin Marathon 2012

Olena Shurkhno (Ukrainian: Олена Шурхно, née Samko – Самко; born 8 January 1978) is a Ukrainian long-distance runner who specialises in the marathon. Her personal best for the distance of 2:23:32 hours is the Ukrainian record. She has won marathons in Baltimore, Tempe, Arizona and Nashville.

== Career ==
Shurkhno started her career as a steeplechase specialist and competed at national level in the event until 2005. She set her personal best for the 3000 metres steeplechase of 10:19.19 minutes in 2004 and also timed 10:13.71 in a novel indoor version of the event. It was only when she turned her running talents to the road racing circuit in 2007 that her international career blossomed.

Having signed up with Andrey Baranov's Spartanik sports agency, she travelled to compete at the Country Music Marathon and her first competitive marathon outing brought her a win in 2:37:52 hours. She returned to the race the following year and was an improved runner. She did not defend her title, being beaten by Russian Svetlana Ponomarenko, but came second with a much improved time of 2:33:37 hours. A similar result came at the Toronto Waterfront Marathon later that year, where she was second to Mulu Seboka and ran a new best of 2:30:13 hours.

Her sole outing of 2009 saw her win the Rock 'n' Roll Arizona Marathon. She managed third at the same race the following year, but performed less well at the Rock 'n' Roll San Diego Marathon, finishing ninth. Shurkhno returned to the top of the marathon podium at the Baltimore Marathon in October. The 2011 San Diego Marathon was quick and she dipped under two and half hours for the first time, recording 2:28:34 for fourth while the winner Bizunesh Deba set a state record. Shurkhno set one herself while defending her title at the 2011 Baltimore Marathon, as she clocked a Maryland state record of 2:29:11 hours.

Moving away from her typical racing grounds in the United States, she competed at the high calibre Nagoya Women's Marathon in Japan in March 2012 and improved her best by almost three minutes, coming seventh in 2:25:49. She was overlooked for the Ukrainian Olympic team and Tetyana Hamera-Shmyrko set a national record at the event. This mark did not stand for long as a month later Shurkhno ran a new Ukrainian record time of 2:23:32 hours to place third at the 2012 Berlin Marathon.

== Personal life ==
She is a mother of one (a son) and her hobbies include fishing and mushroom hunting.

== Personal bests ==
- Half marathon – 1:11:58 (2012)
- 25 kilometres – 1:25:16 (2012)
- 30 kilometres – 1:42:18 (2012)
- Marathon – 2:23:32 (2012)
- 3000 metres steeplechase – 10:19.19 (2004)
