= Bohdan Chornomaz =

Ukrainian male athlete

Personal information
- Born: 2 April 1996 (age 30) Pryluky, Ukraine

Sport
- Sport: Athletics
- Event: 110 metres hurdles
- Coached by: Serhiy Basenko, Anastasiya Rabchenyuk
Medal record
European Games
Gold medal – first place	2019 Minsk	Team event

Bohdan Chornomaz (Ukrainian: Чорномаз Богдан Анатолійович; born 2 April 1996 in Pryluky, Ukraine) is a male Ukrainian athlete specialising in the 110 metres hurdles. He won a gold medal at the 2019 European Games. He is 2021 Ukrainian champion.

== Personal bests ==
As of July 19, 2022.

Outdoor

- 100 metres – 11.24 (Kyiv 2016)
- 200 metres – 23.16 (Lutsk 2017)
- 110 metres hurdles – 13.91 (Lutsk 2018)
- 400 metres – 46.42 (Kropyvnytskiy 2018)

Indoor

- 60 metres – 7.46 (Kyiv 2014)
- 60 metres hurdles – 7.86 (Toruń 2021)

== Personal life ==
His father Anatoliy Chornomaz competed as weightlifter in youth and junior competitions. His mother Svitlana Chornomaz is a former biathlete and she was a member of the Soviet national team.

His wife is Ukrainian athlete Natalya Pyrozhenko who competes in 400 metres and 800 metres. He works as a sports coach. He provided live television commentary of the 2022 World Athletics Championships for the Suspilne.
