= Oksana Shkurat =

Ukrainian hurdler

Oksana Shkurat (born 30 July 1993) is a Ukrainian hurdler. She competed at the 2016 Summer Olympics in the women's 100 metres hurdles race; her time of 13.22 seconds in the heats did not qualify her for the semifinals.
