= Dubivtsi, Ternopil Oblast =

Dubivtsi Дубівці
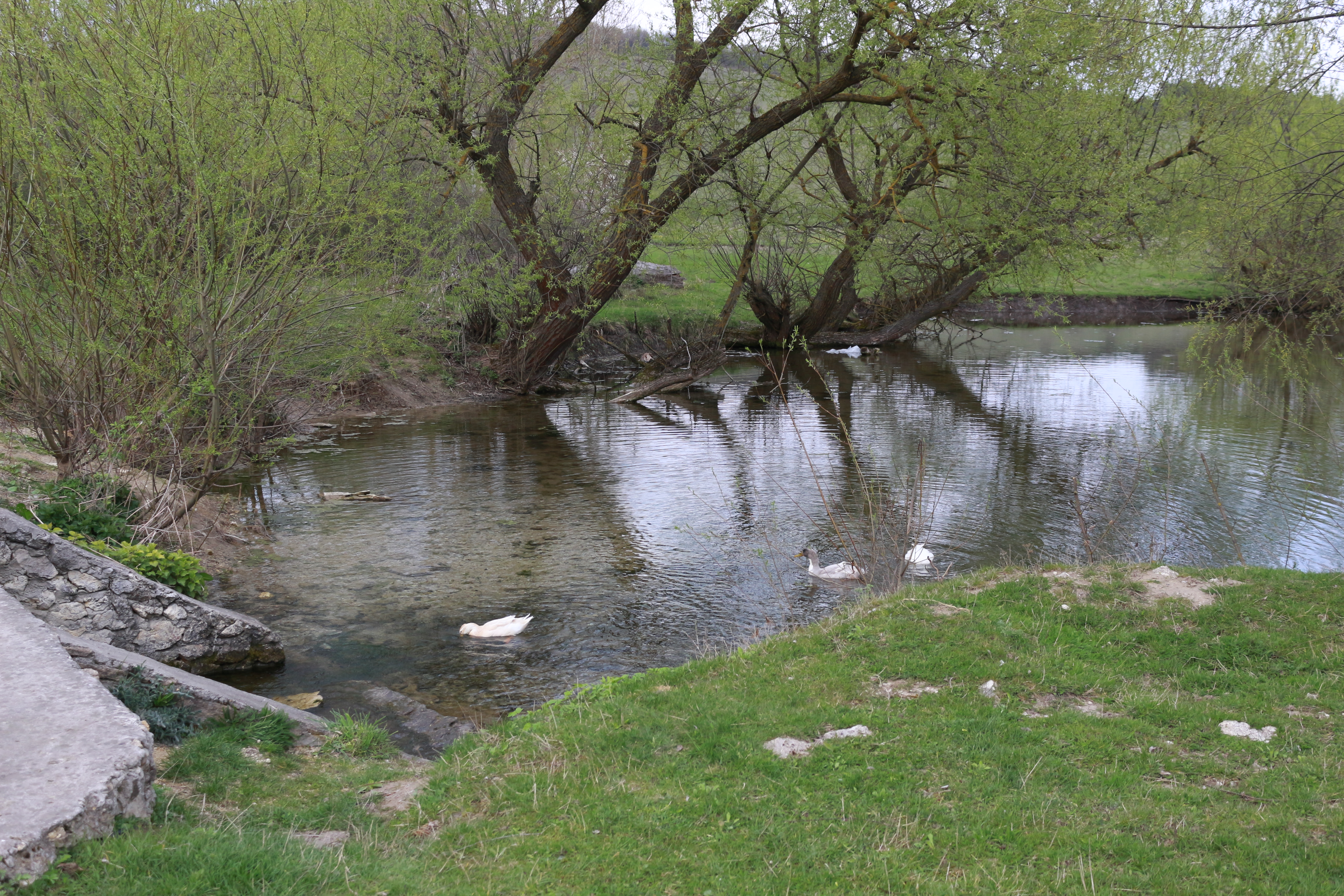
- A stream from a spring

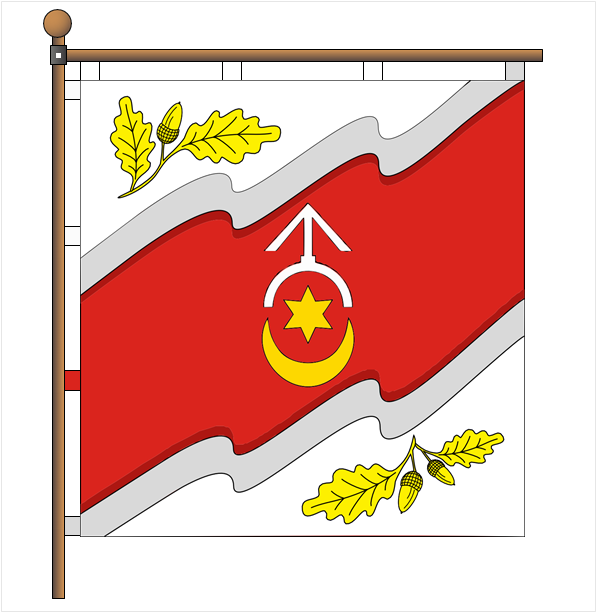
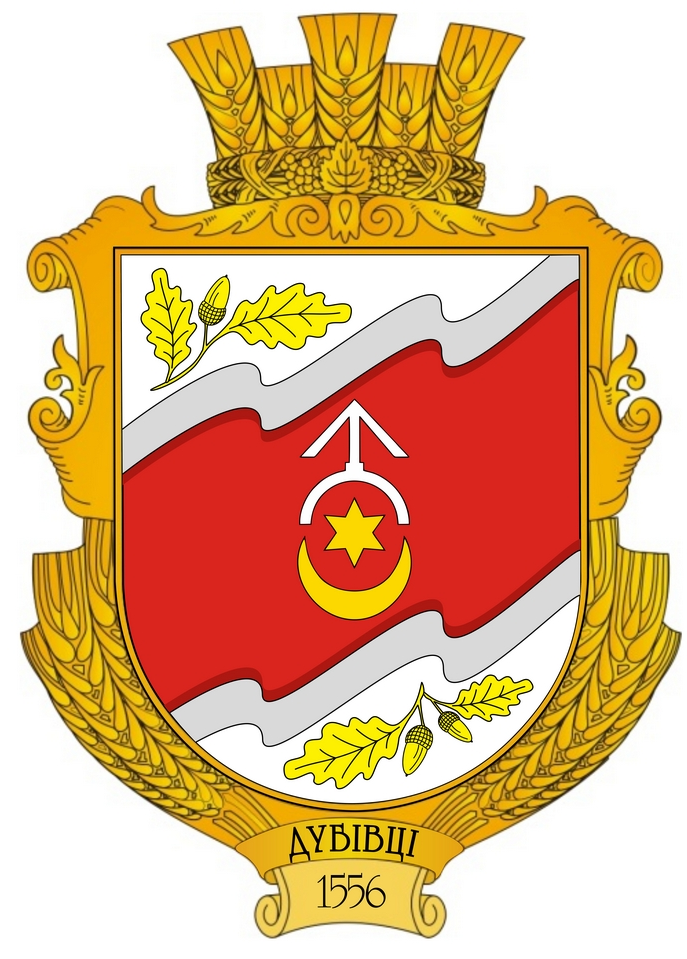
- Flag Coat of arms

- Location in Ternopil Oblast
- Coordinates: 49°40′53″N 25°38′19″E
- Country: Ukraine
- Oblast: Ternopil Oblast
- Raion: Ternopil Raion
- Hromada: Baikivtsi Hromada

Population (2023)
  - Total: 585
- Time zone: UTC+2 (EET)
  - Summer (DST): UTC+3 (EEST)
- Postal code: 47702

Dubivtsi (Ukrainian: Дубівці, Polish: Dubowce) is a village in Ukraine, Ternopil Oblast, Ternopil Raion, Baikivtsi village hromada.

== History ==
The first written mention is from 1556.

Since 21 August 2015, Dubivtsi has belonged to the Baikivtsi village hromada.

== Religion ==
- Saint Michael church (1906; stone, OCU)
- Saint Michael church (2011; stone; UGCC)
- church (1939; dismantled in 1954–1955; RCC)

== Notable people ==
- Volodymyr Khanas (born 1966), Ukrainian publicist, local historian, and public figure
