= Pidlissia, Ternopil Oblast =

Pidlissia Підлісся
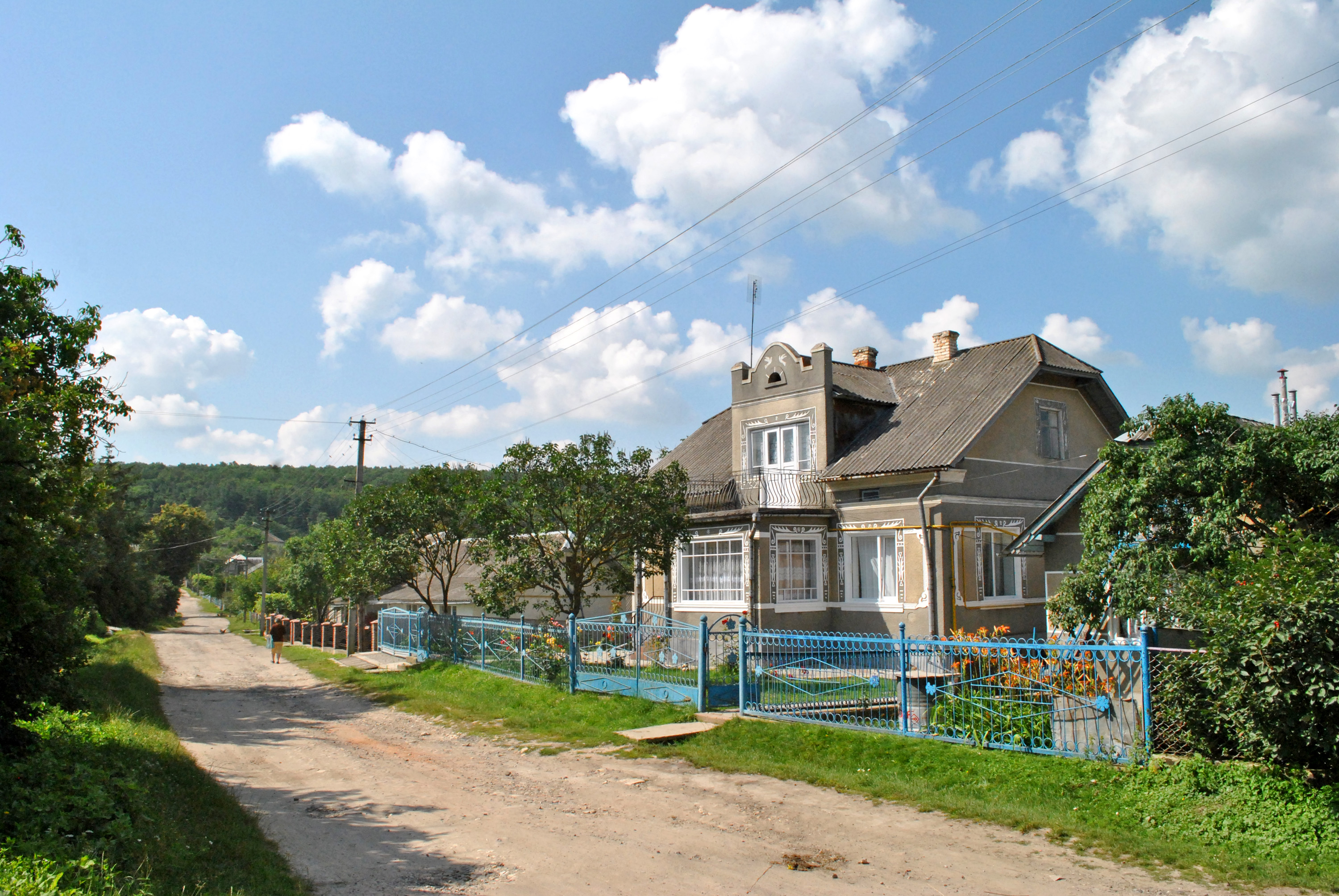
- Interactive map of Pidlissia
- Coordinates: 49°03′54″N 25°24′57″E
- Country: Ukraine
- Oblast: Ternopil Oblast
- Raion: Chortkiv Raion

Area
  - Total: 0.450 km^{2} (0.174 sq mi)

Population (2001 census)
  - Total: 422
  - Density: 937.78/km^{2} (2,428.8/sq mi)
- Time zone: UTC+2 (EET)
  - Summer (DST): UTC+3 (EEST)
- Postal code: 48423
- Area code: +380 3544

Pidlissia (Ukrainian: Підлісся) is a village in Chortkiv Raion (district) of Ternopil Oblast (province) in western Ukraine. It belongs to Buchach urban hromada, one of the hromadas of Ukraine. Strypa River flows about 1 km from the western edge of the village.

== History ==
First written mention comes from the 19th century. Then Pidlissia belonged to the Kingdom of Galicia and Lodomeria, a part of Austrian-Hungarian empire, in 1918-1919 to West Ukrainian People's Republic.

For a long time until 1939 Polish population predominanted in the village.

Until 18 July 2020, Pidlissia belonged to Buchach Raion. The raion was abolished in July 2020 as part of the administrative reform of Ukraine, which reduced the number of raions of Ternopil Oblast to three. The area of Buchach Raion was merged into Chortkiv Raion.
