= Nataliya Strebkova =

Ukrainian athlete (born 1995)

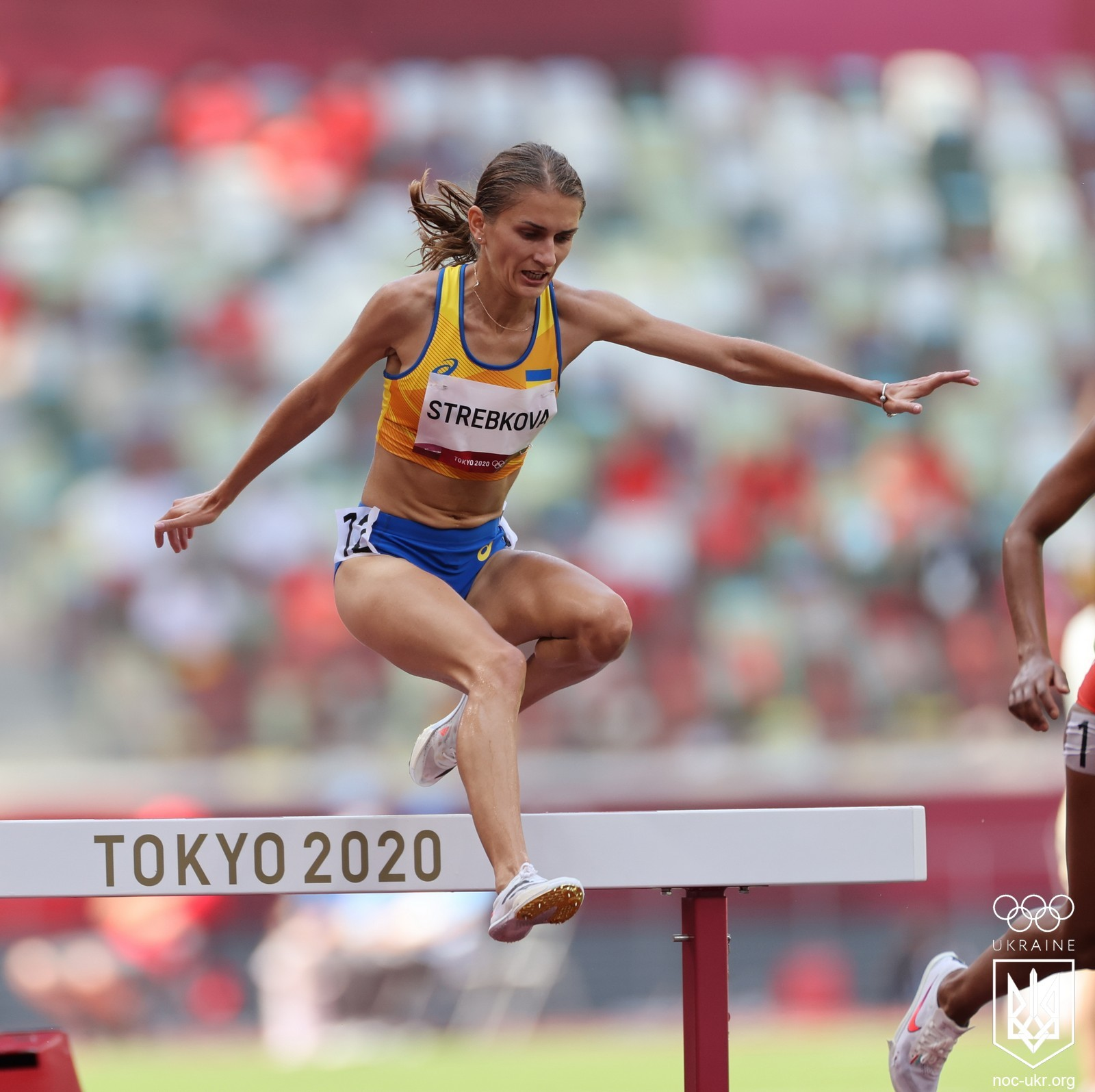
- Strebkova at the 2020 Summer Olympics

Personal information
- Nationality: Ukraine
- Born: 6 March 1995 (age 31) Studinka, Kalush Raion, Ivano-Frankivsk Oblast, Ukraine
- Spouse: Ivan Strebkov

Sport
- Sport: Track and field
- Event: 3000m steeplechase
Medal record
Track and field
Representing Ukraine
European U23 Championships
Silver medal – second place	2015 Tallinn	Women's 3000m steeplechase

Nataliya Strebkova or Nataliia Strebkova (Ukrainian: Наталія Стребкова, maiden name Soltan, born 6 March 1995 in Kalush Raion) is a Ukrainian runner. She is a multiple-time national champion in the 3000 metres steeplechase, and indoors over 3000 metres. She competed at the 2020 Olympic Games in Tokyo.

== Career ==
She finished in thirteenth place at the 2014 IAAF World Junior Championships in the 3000 metres race in Eugene, Oregon. She won the Ukrainian U23 cross country race in 2016 in Bila Tserkva. She was a silver medalist in the 3000 metres steeplechase at the 2017 European Athletics U23 Championships in Bydgoszcz, Poland. Her time of 9:44.52 broke her own Ukrainian youth record by five tenths of a second.

Strebkova ran the Athletics at the 2020 Summer Olympics – Women's 3000 metres steeplechase where she finished eleventh in heat one in a time of 9:49.15.

She was one of 22 Ukrainian athletes accompanied out of Kyiv to compete at the 2022 World Athletics Championships in Eugene, Oregon in July 2022, despite the Russian invasion of Ukraine that year. At the Championships, she ran in the 3000 metres steeplechase and placed seventh in her heat in a time of 9:25.85. She also competed over that distance at the 2022 European Athletics Championships in Munich, Germany, qualifying for the final and placing ninth overall in a time of 9:37.52.

In February 2023, she was runner-up at Albufeira on the World Athletics Cross Country Tour.

== Personal life ==
She is from Ternopil. Her husband is Ukrainian runner Ivan Strebkov. As of 2022, they lived in Kyiv.
