= Bohdan-Ivan Horodyskyi =

Ukrainian long-distance runner

Personal information
- Born: 18 May 1994 (age 31)

Sport
- Country: Ukraine
- Sport: Athletics
- Event: Long-distance running

Bohdan-Ivan Volodymyrovych Horodyskyi or Bohdan-Ivan Horodyskyy (Ukrainian: Богдан-Іван Володимирович Городиський; born 18 May 1994) is a Ukrainian long-distance runner.

== Career ==
In 2020, he competed in the men's race at the 2020 World Athletics Half Marathon Championships held in Gdynia, Poland. On October 17, 2020, he finished 20th in the half marathon at the World Championships with a new national record (1:00.40), surpassing the previous achievement of Serhiy Lebid (1:01.51), set in 2003.

In 2019, he competed in the men's event at the 2019 European 10,000m Cup held in London, United Kingdom.

In 2021, he competed in the men's marathon at the 2020 Summer Olympics held in Tokyo, Japan.
