= Ivan Strebkov (runner) =

Ukrainian cross country runner

Personal information
- Native name: Іван Олексійович Стребков
- Full name: Ivan Oleksiiovych Strebkov
- Nationality: Ukrainian
- Citizenship: Ukraine
- Born: 28 August 1991 (age 34) Pidlissia, Buchach Raion
- Education: Ternopil National Economy University, now West Ukrainian National University
- Occupation(s): middle-distance and cross country runner
- Spouse: Nataliia Strebkova
- Other interests: music

Sport
- Country: Ukraine
- Sport: Athletics, Track and field
- Event(s): Middle-distance running, cross country running

Ivan Oleksiiovych Strebkov (Ukrainian: Іван Олексійович Стребков; born 28 September 1991 in Pidlissia, Buchach Raion, Ternopil Oblast, Ukraine) is a Ukrainian middle-distance runner and cross country runner.

He graduated from school No. 3 (2008, gold medal) and a music school (saxophone class) in Buchach. In 2008 he entered the Ternopil National Economy University (now West Ukrainian National University), that later graduated.

His wife is a Ukrainian athlete, runner Nataliia Strebkova.

== Sports career ==
He started running seriously in the 10th grade of the school.

Achievements

- vice-champion of Europe in cross-country 2013 (U-23, team)
- bronze medalist of the team European Championship 2014 in the 10,000 m run in Skopje (team)
- champion of Ukraine,
- record holder of "Ternopilska ozeriana"
