= Avanhard Stadium (Lutsk) =

Football stadium in Ukraine

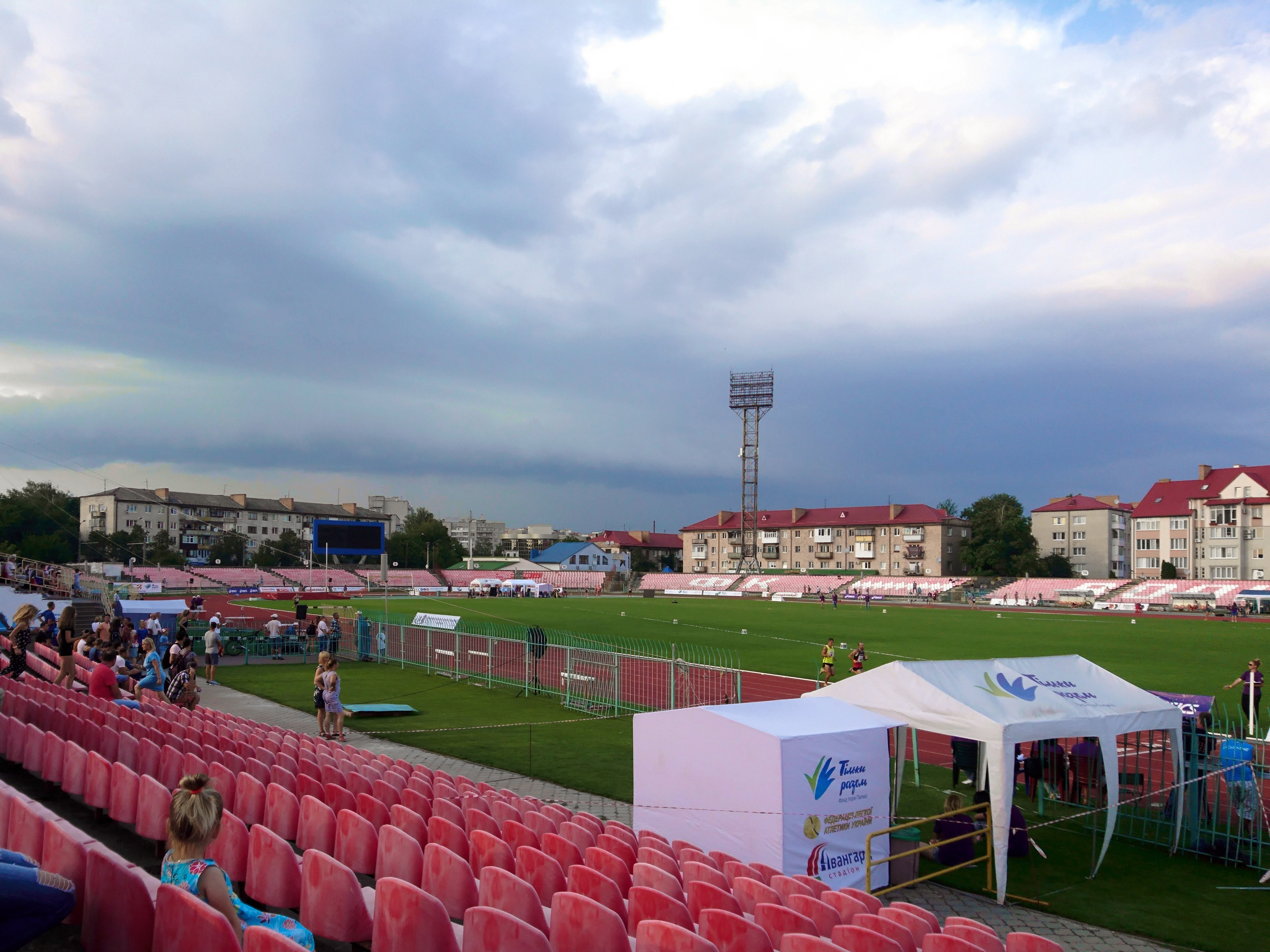
- Interactive map of Avanhard Stadium
- Location: Lutsk, Ukraine
- Coordinates: 50°45′15″N 25°20′15″E
- Owner: Public
- Capacity: 12,080 (football)
- Surface: Grass
- Field size: 105 m × 68 m (344 ft × 223 ft)

Construction
- Groundbreaking: 1960

Tenant
- Volyn Lutsk

Avanhard Stadium is a multi-purpose stadium in Lutsk, Ukraine. It is currently used mostly for football matches, and is the home of FC Volyn Lutsk. The stadium holds 12,080 people and was opened in 1960.

Between August 1980 and April 1981, the stadium underwent reconstruction, during which an electric scoreboard and floodlight towers were installed. In the winter of 1993, electric field heating was installed, and the lighting projectors were replaced with more powerful ones.

== International matches ==
| Team #1 | Score | Team #2 | Date | Round |
|---|---|---|---|---|
| Ukraine | 1–1 | Czech Republic | 8 June 2003 | UEFA Women's Euro 2005 qualifying |
