= Artem Shamatryn =

Ukrainian athlete

Personal information
- Born: 15 June 1991 (age 34)
- Height: 1.93 m (6 ft 4 in)
- Weight: 82 kg (181 lb)

Sport
- Sport: Athletics
- Event(s): 110 m hurdles, 60 m hurdles
- Coached by: S. Basenko, T. Stepanova

Artem Shamatryn (Ukrainian: Артем Шаматрин; born 15 June 1991) is a Ukrainian athlete specialising in the high hurdles. He represented his country at the 2016 World Indoor Championships without advancing from the heats.

His personal bests are 13.80 seconds in the 110 metres hurdles (+0.5 m/s, Lutsk 2018) and 7.70 seconds in the 60 metres hurdles (Kyiv 2016).

== International competitions ==
Year	Competition	Venue	Position	Event	Notes
Representing Ukraine
2016	World Indoor Championships	Eugene, United States	24th (h)	60 m hurdles	7.95
2016	European Championships	Amsterdam, Netherlands	20th (h)	110 m hurdles	14.47
2017	European Indoor Championships	Belgrade, Serbia	–	60 m hurdles	DQ
2018	European Championships	Berlin, Germany	14th (h)	110 m hurdles	14.02
2019	European Indoor Championships	Glasgow, United Kingdom	19th (h)	60 m hurdles	7.90
