= Ihor Musiyenko =

Ukrainian shot putter

Personal information
- Nationality: Ukrainian
- Born: 22 August 1993 (age 32)

Sport
- Sport: Athletics
- Event: Shot put

Achievements and titles
- Personal bests: Shot put: 21.15 m (Chisinau 2021); Discus: 59.18 m (Kyiv 2017)

Ihor Musiyenko (Ukrainian: Мусієнко Ігор Володимирович; born 22 August 1993) is a Ukrainian athlete specializing in shot put. He represented Ukraine at the 2020 Summer Olympics.
