= Roman Kokoshko =

Ukrainian shot putter (born 1996)

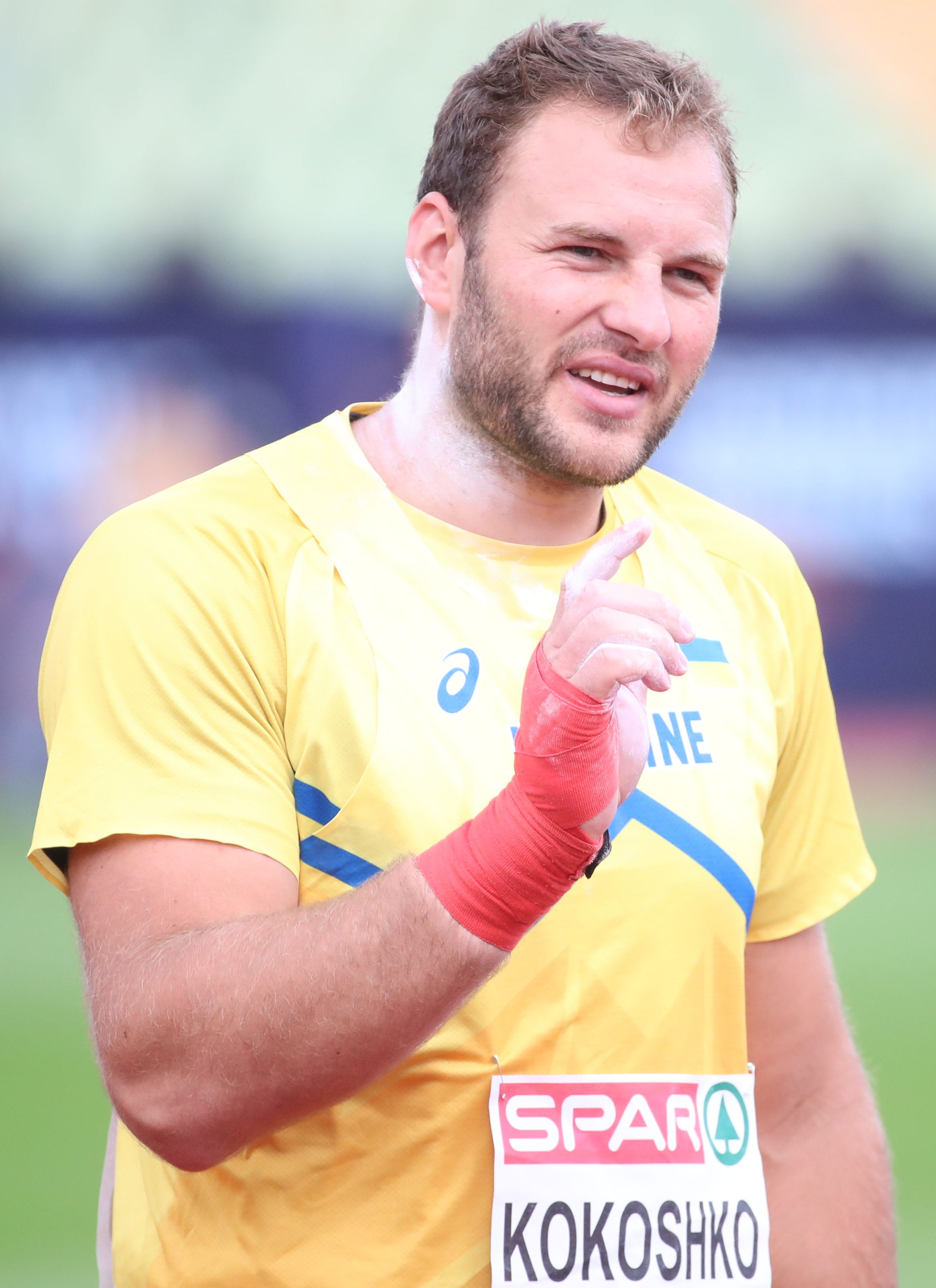
- Kokoshko, 2022

Personal information
- Full name: Roman Volodymyrovych Kokoshko
- National team: Ukraine
- Born: 16 August 1996 (age 29) Odesa Oblast, Ukraine

Sport
- Sport: Athletics
- Events: Shot put, Discus

Achievements and titles
- Personal bests: Shot put outdoor: 21.23m (2022); Shot put indoor: 21.84m (2023) NR
Medal record
Men's athletics
Representing Ukraine
European Indoor Championships
Bronze medal – third place	2023 Istanbul	Shot put

Roman Kokoshko (Ukrainian: Роман Володимирович Кокошко; born 16 August 1996) is a Ukrainian track and field athlete who competes predominantly in shot put. He was a bronze medalist at the 2023 European Athletics Indoor Championships where he became the Ukrainian national record holder.

Kokoshko is currently serving a 22-month ban due to end in October 2026 for an anti-doping rule violation for missing three tests in a 12-month period.

== Career ==
From Odesa, Kokoshko became the champion of Ukraine on August 22, 2019, with a personal best throw of 19.70m.

He began training in Portugal in 2021 under the guidance of the Ukrainian coach Volodymyr Zinchenko. The following summer he marked a new personal best throw of 21.23 metres at an event in Lisbon.

In 2022 Kokoshko took part in the World Athletics Championships in Eugene, Oregon and the European Athletics Championships in Munich, but did not qualify for the final in either event.

Kokoshko set a new national shot put record in winning the bronze medal at the 2023 European Athletics Indoor Championships in Istanbul, on March 3, 2023. He threw 21.84 to beat the mark set by Oleksandr Bagach in 1999. He achieved this with his last throw in the event.

He competed in the shot put at the 2024 Summer Olympics in Paris in August 2024, placing 13th in his qualifying group with a distance of 19.36 metres.

After a provisional suspension, in May 2025 Kokoshko was served with a 22-month ban by the Athletics Integrity Unit for missing three tests in a 12-month period ("whereabouts failures"). The ban has been set to run from December 2024 to October 2026.
