= Yana Hladiychuk =

Ukrainian pole vaulter (born 1993)

Personal information
- Nationality: Ukrainian
- Born: 21 May 1993 (age 33)

Sport
- Sport: Athletics
- Event: Pole vault

Yana Vitaliivna Hladiychuk (Ukrainian: Яна Віталіївна Гладійчук; born 21 May 1993) is a Ukrainian athlete. She competed in the women's pole vault event at the 2020 Summer Olympics.
