= Oleksandr Pohorilko =

Ukrainian sprinter (born 2000)

Personal information
- Nationality: Ukrainian
- Born: 16 April 2000 (age 26) Korop, Chernihiv Oblast, Ukraine
- Height: 1.83 m (6 ft 0 in)
- Weight: 75 kg (165 lb)

Sport
- Sport: Athletics
- Event: 400 metres
- Club: Sumy Olympic Training Centre
- Coached by: Oleh Bilodid

Oleksandr Serhiyovych Pohorilko (Ukrainian: Олександр Сергійович Погорілко; born 16 April 2000) is a Ukrainian athlete. He competed in the mixed 4 × 400 metres relay event where the team finished 14th and in the 400 metres event at the 2020 Summer Olympics.

At the 2025 European Athletics Team Championships, Pohorilko set new national record of 44.94 in the 400 m event.
