= Mariya Mykolenko =

Ukrainian hurdler

Personal information
- Nationality: Ukrainian
- Born: 4 April 1994 (age 32)

Sport
- Sport: Athletics
- Event: 400 metres hurdles
Medal record
Women's athletics
Representing Ukraine
Military World Games
Bronze medal – third place	2019 Wuhan	4×400 m relay

Mariya Mykolenko (born 4 April 1994) is a Ukrainian athlete. She competed in the women's 400 metres hurdles event at the 2020 Summer Olympics.
