= Ukrainian Athletic Federation =

Ukrainian sports governing body

- Федерація легкої атлетики України
- Sport: Athletics
- Abbreviation: UAF
- Founded: 1991
- Affiliation: World Athletics
- Affiliation date: 1993
- Regional affiliation: EAA
- Headquarters: Kyiv, Ukraine
- President: Yevhen Pronin (acting)
- Vice president(s): Olena Hovorova (first vice president), Viktor Hrinyuk, Volodymyr Rudyuk

Official website
- uaf.org.ua
- (Ukraine)

The Ukrainian Athletic Federation (UAF; Ukrainian: Федерація легкої атлетики України (ФЛАУ)) - is the governing body for the sport of athletics in Ukraine. Acting President of the Athletics Federation of Ukraine in January 2023 was Yevhen Pronin.

== History ==
UAF was founded in 1991 and was affiliated to the IAAF in 1993.

Former presidents:

- 1991–1996: Yuriy Tumasov
- 1996–2012: Valeriy Borzov
- 2012–2020: Ihor Hotsul
- 2020–2022: Ravil Safiullin
- 2020–2022: Yevhen Pronin

== Affiliations ==
UAF is the national member federation for Ukraine in the following international organisations:

- World Athletics (WA)
- European Athletics (EA)
- Association of Balkan Athletic Federations (ABAF)

== National records ==
UAF maintains the Ukrainian records in athletics.

== Kit suppliers ==
Ukraine's kits are currently supplied by Nike.
