= Athletics at the 1980 Summer Olympics – Men's 10,000 metres =

Men's 10,000 metres at the Games of the XXII Olympiad
- Venue: Central Lenin Stadium
- Dates: July 24–27
- Competitors: 43 from 27 nations
- Winning time: 27:42.69

Medalists
1st place, gold medalist(s)		Miruts Yifter; Ethiopia
2nd place, silver medalist(s)		Kaarlo Maaninka; Finland
3rd place, bronze medalist(s)		Mohamed Kedir; Ethiopia

These are the official results of the men's 10,000 metres event at the 1980 Summer Olympics in Moscow, Soviet Union. There were a total number of 40 participating athletes, with the final held on Sunday July 27, 1980. The winning margin was 1.59 seconds.

== Medalists ==
Gold	Silver	Bronze
Miruts Yifter; Ethiopia	Kaarlo Maaninka; Finland	Mohamed Kedir; Ethiopia

== Records ==
These were the standing world and Olympic records (in minutes) prior to the 1980 Summer Olympics.

World record	27:22.4	(Kenya) Henry Rono	Vienna (AUT)	June 11, 1978
Olympic record	27:38.35	(Finland) Lasse Virén	Munich (FRG)	September 3, 1972

== Results ==
=== Final ===
RANK	FINAL	TIME
	Miruts Yifter (ETH)	27:42.69
	Kaarlo Maaninka (FIN)	27:44.28
	Mohamed Kedir (ETH)	27:44.64
4.	Tolossa Kotu (ETH)	27:46.47
5.	Lasse Virén (FIN)	27:50.46
6.	Jörg Peter (GDR)	28:05.53
7.	Werner Schildhauer (GDR)	28:10.91
8.	Enn Sellik (URS)	28:13.72
9.	Bill Scott (AUS)	28:15.08
10.	Ilie Floroiu (ROU)	28:16.25
11.	Brendan Foster (GBR)	28:22.54
12.	Mike McLeod (GBR)	28:40.78
13.	Martti Vainio (FIN)	28:46.22
14.	Gerard Tebroke (NED)	28:50.08
—	Antonio Prieto (ESP)	DNF

=== Qualifying Heats ===
- Held on Thursday 24 July 1980

==== Heat 1 ====
RANK	HEAT 1	TIME
1.	Mohamed Kedir (ETH)	28:16.38
2.	Kaarlo Maaninka (FIN)	28:30.96
3.	Werner Schildhauer (GDR)	28:32.08
4.	Lasse Virén (FIN)	28:45.72
5.	Stephen Austin (AUS)	29:45.2
6.	Alex Hagelsteens (BEL)	29:47.6
7.	Geoff Smith (GBR)	30:00.1
8.	Abdelmadjid Mada (ALG)	30:23.5
9.	Akel Hamdan (SYR)	31:21.9
10.	Motlalepula Thabana (LES)	34:01.5
—	John Treacy (IRL)	DNF
—	Zakariah Barie (TAN)	DNF
—	Aleksandras Antipovas (URS)	DNF
—	Bernardo Manuel (ANG)	DNS

==== Heat 2 ====
RANK	HEAT 2	TIME
1.	Miruts Yifter (ETH)	28:41.68
2.	Jörg Peter (GDR)	28:49.96
3.	Brendan Foster (GBR)	28:55.15
4.	Enn Sellik (URS)	29:12.1
5.	Antonio Prieto (ESP)	29:12.8
6.	Rachid Habchaoui (ALG)	29:12.9
7.	Enrique Aquino (MEX)	29:21.3
8.	José Gómez (MEX)	29:53.6
9.	Damiano Musonda (ZAM)	29:53.6
10.	Kenias Tembo (ZIM)	30:53.8
11.	Jules Randrianari (MAD)	31:18.4
—	Domingo Tibaduiza (COL)	DNF
—	Gerard Barrett (AUS)	DNS
—	Suleiman Nyambui (TAN)	DNS

==== Heat 3 ====
RANK	HEAT 3	TIME
1.	Tolossa Kotu (ETH)	28:55.26
2.	Mike McLeod (GBR)	28:57.27
3.	Bill Scott (AUS)	28:58.70
4.	Martti Vainio (FIN)	28:59.81
5.	Ilie Floroiu (ROU)	29:03.1
6.	Gerard Tebroke (NED)	29:05.0
7.	Jiri Sikora (TCH)	29:19.8
8.	Rodolfo Gómez (MEX)	29:25.7
9.	Volodymyr Shesterov (URS)	29:32.4
10.	Hari Chand (IND)	29:45.8
11.	Leodigard Martin (TAN)	30:33.4
12.	Golekane Mosveu (BOT)	30:38.8
13.	Nara Bahadur Dahal (NEP)	31:19.8
—	Dias Alface (MOZ)	DNF
—	Markus Ryffel (SUI)	DNF

== See also ==
- 1976 Men's Olympic Games 10000 metres (Montreal)
- 1978 Men's European Championships 10000 metres (Prague)
- 1982 Men's European Championships 10000 metres (Athens)
- 1983 Men's World Championships 10000 metres (Helsinki)
- 1984 Men's Olympic Games 10000 metres (Los Angeles)
- 1986 Men's European Championships 10000 metres (Stuttgart)
- 1987 Men's World Championships 10000 metres (Rome)
