= Athletics at the 1976 Summer Olympics – Men's 10,000 metres =

Men's 10,000 metres at the Games of the XXI Olympiad
- Venue: Olympic Stadium
- Dates: 23 July 1976 (heats); 26 July 1976 (final)
- Competitors: 41 from 27 nations
- Winning time: 27:40.36

Medalists
| 1st place, gold medalist(s) | | Lasse Virén; Finland |
| 2nd place, silver medalist(s) | | Carlos Lopes; Portugal |
| 3rd place, bronze medalist(s) | | Brendan Foster; Great Britain |

Official Video Highlights

The official results of the Men's 10,000 metres at the 1976 Summer Olympics in Montreal, Quebec, Canada. The final was held on Monday July 26, 1976, after the qualifying heats were run on Friday July 23, 1976.

== Medalists ==
| Gold | Silver | Bronze |
|---|---|---|
| Lasse Virén; Finland | Carlos Lopes; Portugal | Brendan Foster; Great Britain |

== Records ==
These were the standing world and Olympic records (in minutes) prior to the 1976 Summer Olympics.

| World record | 27:30.8 | (United Kingdom) David Bedford | London (GBR) | July 13, 1973 |
| Olympic record | 27:38.35 | (Finland) Lasse Virén | Munich (FRG) | September 3, 1972 |

== Results ==
=== Final ===
This 10,000-metre final started slowly, with Britain's Anthony Simmons leading at 1,000 metres in 2:52.95. Around 200 metres later, Belgium's Marc Smet accelerated briefly, but with little effect on the other 15 runners. However, before 2,000 metres there was some pushing in the tightly bunched field. As a result, Norway's Knut Boro injured one of his legs, and he was forced to drop out. The pace only improved slightly through 2,000 metres (5:44.08) and 3,000 metres (8:33.37). Around 3,300 metres, Portugal's Carlos Lopes took the lead for the first time, but he was shortly thereafter passed by Simmons. Gradually Australia's David Fitzimons, who had exhausted himself in his qualifying heat, started to lose contact with the lead group. Lopes led the field at 4,000 metres in 11:22.82. During the fifth kilometre, he slowly accelerated the pace by over 3 seconds. At 5,000 metres, Lopes's time was 14:08.94. By 6,000 metres (16:52.29), several runners had already dropped from the lead group: The Netherlands' Jos Hermens, Belgium's Karel Lismont and Emiel Puttemans, France's Jean-Paul Gomez, Australia's Christopher Wardlaw, the United States' Gary Bjorklund, and Britain's Bernard Ford. Shortly after 6,000 metres, also Spain's Mariano Haro and Britain's Simmons lost contact with the top runners. The next runner to drop from the lead group was Romania's Ilie Floroiu. At 6,800 metres, the discouraged Puttemans dropped out of the final. Lopes's exhausting pace continued through 7,000 metres (19:36.34), shortly after which Smet dropped from the top runners' group. Foster was the next runner to lose contact with Lopes, at 8,000 metres (22:20.19). Lopes and Viren lapped Fitzsimons at 8,600 metres, while Foster lapped the worn out Australian runner at 8,900 metres. Lopes led still at 9,000 metres (25:02.88), with Viren remaining close behind him. Around 9,550 metres, Viren at last moved out from the first lane's inner edge, in order to pass Lopes. The tenacious Portuguese runner could not accelerate his pace, and thus Viren easily and quickly broke away from him. The only suspense during the last lap involved the bronze medalist's identity. Despite his fatigue, Foster was able to run the last lap in 63–64 seconds, which was enough to hold off Simmons' strong final kick. (Hannus, Matti, The Montreal Olympic Book / Montrealin olympiakirja, Finland, 1976; Wunsche, Wolfgang, The Heroes of the Race Tracks (the Finnish edition, c. 1984-1985); https://www.youtube.com/watch?v=Y6NPfl8igr4 Lasse Viren, Montrealin 10000m (Finnish commentary); https://www.youtube.com/watch?v=xFVKBK0eM24&t=19s Olympics - 1972 Munich & 1976 Montreal - Track - Mens 5K & 10K - FIN Lasse Virein imasportsphile (English commentary).)

| RANK | FINAL | TIME |
|---|---|---|
| | Lasse Virén (FIN) | 27:40.38 |
| | Carlos Lopes (POR) | 27:45.17 |
| | Brendan Foster (GBR) | 27:54.92 |
| 4. | Tony Simmons (GBR) | 27:56.26 |
| 5. | Ilie Floroiu (ROU) | 27:59.93 |
| 6. | Mariano Haro (ESP) | 28:00.28 |
| 7. | Marc Smet (BEL) | 28:02.80 |
| 8. | Bernie Ford (GBR) | 28:17.78 |
| 9. | Jean-Paul Gomez (FRA) | 28:24.07 |
| 10. | Jos Hermens (NED) | 28:25.04 |
| 11. | Karel Lismont (BEL) | 28:26.48 |
| 12. | Chris Wardlaw (AUS) | 28:29.91 |
| 13. | Garry Bjorklund (USA) | 28:38.08 |
| 14. | David Fitzsimons (AUS) | 29:17.74 |
| — | Knut Børø (NOR) | DNF |
| — | Emiel Puttemans (BEL) | DNF |

=== A ===
| RANK | HEAT 1 | TIME |
|---|---|---|
| 1. | Carlos Lopes (POR) | 28:04.53 |
| 2. | Jean-Paul Gomez (FRA) | 28:10.52 |
| 3. | Mariano Haro (ESP) | 28:11.66 |
| 4. | Jos Hermens (NED) | 28:16.07 |
| 5. | Dave Fitzsimons (AUS) | 28:16.43 |
| 6. | Bernie Ford (GBR) | 28:17.26 |
| 7. | Karel Lismont (BEL) | 28:17.45 |
| 8. | Martti Vainio (FIN) | 28:26.60 |
| 9. | Dušan Janićijević (YUG) | 28:48.87 |
| 10. | Ed Mendoza (USA) | 29:02.97 |
| 11. | Víctor Mora (COL) | 30:26.57 |
| 12. | Chris McCubbins (CAN) | 33:33.35 |
| 13. | Olmeus Charles (HAI) | 42:00.11 |
| – | Adelaziz Bouguerra (TUN) | DNS |
| – | Michalis Kousis (GRE) | DNS |

=== B ===
| RANK | HEAT 2 | TIME |
|---|---|---|
| 1. | Marc Smet (BEL) | 28:22.07 |
| 2. | Brendan Foster (GBR) | 28:22.19 |
| 3. | Knut Børø (NOR) | 28:23.07 |
| 4. | Ilie Floroiu (ROU) | 28:23.40 |
| 5. | Franco Fava (ITA) | 28:24.80 |
| 6. | Craig Virgin (USA) | 28:30.22 |
| 7. | Edmundo Warnke (CHI) | 28:43.63 |
| 8. | Hari Chand (IND) | 28:48.72 |
| 9. | Eddie Leddy (IRL) | 28:55.49 |
| 10. | Domingo Tibaduiza (COL) | 29:28.17 |
| 11. | Rodolfo Gómez (MEX) | 30:05.19 |
| 12. | Pierre Lévisse (FRA) | 30:07.84 |
| – | Pekka Päivärinta (FIN) | DNF |
| – | Raja Faradj Al-Shalawi (KSA) | DNF |
| – | Abdelkader Zaddem (TUN) | DNS |

=== C ===
| RANK | HEAT 3 | TIME |
|---|---|---|
| 1. | Tony Simmons (GBR) | 28:01.82 |
| 2. | Garry Bjorklund (USA) | 28:12.24 |
| 3. | Lasse Virén (FIN) | 28:14.95 |
| 4. | Emiel Puttemans (BEL) | 28:15.52 |
| 5. | Chris Wardlaw (AUS) | 28:17.52 |
| 6. | Detlef Uhlemann (FRG) | 28:29.28 |
| 7. | Toshiaki Kamata (JPN) | 28:36.21 |
| 8. | Luis Hernández (MEX) | 28:44.17 |
| 9. | Dick Quax (NZL) | 28:56.92 |
| 10. | Dan Shaughnessy (CAN) | 29:26.96 |
| 11. | Lucien Rault (FRA) | 29:40.76 |
| 12. | José Luis Ruiz (ESP) | 31:03.43 |
| 13. | Hossein Rabbi (IRI) | 31:44.27 |
| 14. | Tau John Tokwepota (PNG) | 32:26.96 |
| – | Mohammed Gammoudi (TUN) | DNS |

== See also ==
- 1972 Men's Olympic Games 10000 metres (Munich)
- 1974 Men's European Championships 10000 metres (Rome)
- 1978 Men's European Championships 10000 metres (Prague)
- 1980 Men's Olympic Games 10000 metres (Moscow)
- 1982 Men's European Championships 10000 metres (Athens)
- 1983 Men's World Championships 10000 metres (Helsinki)
