= 1982 European Athletics Championships – Men's 10,000 metres =

Men's 10,000 metres at the European Athletics Championships

These are the official results of the Men's 10,000 metres event at the 1982 European Championships in Athens, Greece, held at Olympic Stadium "Spiros Louis" on 6 September 1982.

== Medalists ==
Gold	Alberto Cova; Italy
Silver	Werner Schildhauer; East Germany
Bronze	Martti Vainio; Finland

== Results ==
=== Final ===
6 September

Rank	Name	Nationality	Time	Notes
1st place, gold medalist(s)	Alberto Cova	Italy	27:41.03	
2nd place, silver medalist(s)	Werner Schildhauer	East Germany	27:41.21	
3rd place, bronze medalist(s)	Martti Vainio	Finland	27:42.51	
4	Carlos Lopes	Portugal	27:47.95	
5	Julian Goater	United Kingdom	28:10.98	
6	Salvatore Antibo	Italy	28:21.07	
7	Steve Jones	United Kingdom	28:22.94	
8	Charles Spedding	United Kingdom	28:25.91	
9	Thierry Watrice	France	28:39.44	
10	Alex Hagelsteens	Belgium	28:40.90	
11	Hans Segerfeldt	Sweden	28:42.83	
12	Mats Erixon	Sweden	28:45.82	
13	Keld Johnsen	Denmark	29:08.32	
14	Antonio Prieto	Spain	29:09.29	
15	Toomas Turb	Soviet Union	29:15.75	
16	Roy Andersen	Norway	29:32.01	
17	John Woods	Ireland	29:39.88	
18	Marios Kasianidis	Greece	29:45.09	

== Participation ==
According to an unofficial count, 18 athletes from 14 countries participated in the event.

- Belgium (1)
- Denmark (1)
- East Germany (1)
- Finland (1)
- France (1)
- Greece (1)
- Ireland (1)
- Italy (2)
- Norway (1)
- Portugal (1)
- Soviet Union (1)
- Spain (1)
- Sweden (2)
- United Kingdom (3)

== See also ==
- 1978 Men's European Championships 10,000 metres (Prague)
- 1980 Men's Olympic 10,000 metres (Moscow)
- 1983 Men's World Championships 10,000 metres (Helsinki)
- 1984 Men's Olympic 10,000 metres (Los Angeles)
- 1986 Men's European Championships 10,000 metres (Stuttgart)
- 1987 Men's World Championships 10,000 metres (Rome)
