= 1978 European Athletics Championships – Men's 5000 metres =

Men's 5000 metres at the European Athletics Championships

The men's 5000 metres at the 1978 European Athletics Championships was held in Prague, then Czechoslovakia, at Stadion Evžena Rošického on 31 August and 2 September 1978.

== Medalists ==
| Gold | Venanzio Ortis; Italy |
| Silver | Markus Ryffel; Switzerland |
| Silver | Aleksandr Fedotkin; Soviet Union |

== Results ==
=== Final ===
2 September Most of this final was run at a slow and tactical pace. 1,000 metres was passed in 2:44.6, with the Soviet Union's Enn Sellik leading the race. Soon thereafter, West Germany's Christoph Herle took the lead. His teammate Frank Zimmermann passed Herle before 1,600 metres. Zimmermann led the leading group at 2,000 metres in 5:28.1. Only Portugal's Fernando Mamede, a talented but notably nervous runner, lost contact with the main group already soon after 1,000 metres. Before 3,000 metres, Britain's Nick Rose surged into the lead, dropping West Germany's Christoph Herle, and reaching 3,000 metres in 8:09.5. During the next kilometre, despite the rather slow pace, also West Germany's Karl Fleschen and Frank Zimmermann, East Germany's Jörg Peter, Belgium's Léon Schots, the Soviet Union's Boris Kuznetsov, and his team mate Enn Sellik dropped from the lead group. Vainio was leading at 4,000 metres in 10:53.3. He was followed by Rose, Romania's Ilie Floroiu, Italy's Venanzio Ortis, the Soviet Union's Aleksandr Fyodotkin, Switzerland's Markus Ryffel, and Ireland's John Treacy. Sellik tried to catch the leading group, but could not. At 4,600 metres, reached in about 12:30–12:31, the seven-runner leading group was still tightly together. Around 4,700 metres, Floroiu suddenly rushed past Vainio who could, however, still increase his pace. Rose started to drop from the lead group, and for a few crucial seconds, Treacy lingered behind him. Vainio managed to keep his lead until the second half of the final bend, when Ryffel, Ortis, and Fyodotkin sprinted past him. During the first half of the home straight, also Floroiu and Treacy managed to pass Vainio. While Ortis narrowly but decisively passed Ryffel and Fyodotkin, Treacy kicked past Floroiu, and kept closing in on the three leading runners. Despite his narrow victory, Ortis raised his arms in triumph, while Fyodotkin and Ryffel crossed the finish line so tied that even the finish-line camera could not separate them. This was a very tight finish for a major championship final; the first four runners crossed the line 0.31 seconds apart, the first five runners in 0.8 seconds, and the first six runners in 1.2 seconds.

| Rank | Name | Nationality | Time | Notes |
|---|---|---|---|---|
| 1st place, gold medalist(s) | Venanzio Ortis | Italy | 13:28.52 | |
| 2nd place, silver medalist(s) | Markus Ryffel | Switzerland | 13:28.60 | |
| 2nd place, silver medalist(s) | Aleksandr Fedotkin | Soviet Union | 13:28.60 | |
| 4 | John Treacy | Ireland | 13:28.83 | |
| 5 | Ilie Floroiu | Romania | 13:29.27 | |
| 6 | Martti Vainio | Finland | 13:29.67 | |
| 7 | Nick Rose | Great Britain | 13:32.8 | |
| 8 | Enn Sellik | Soviet Union | 13:35.8 | |
| 9 | Boris Kuznetsov | Soviet Union | 13:36.5 | |
| 10 | Frank Zimmermann | West Germany | 13:39.1 | |
| 11 | Léon Schots | Belgium | 13:47.4 | |
| 12 | Jörg Peter | East Germany | 13:48.6 | |
| 13 | Karl Fleschen | West Germany | 13:50.3 | |
| 14 | Christoph Herle | West Germany | 13:55.4 | |
| 15 | Fernando Mamede | Portugal | 13:58.2 | |

=== Heats ===
31 August

==== Heat 1 ====
| Rank | Name | Nationality | Time | Notes |
|---|---|---|---|---|
| 1 | Frank Zimmermann | West Germany | 13:32.42 | Q |
| 2 | Martti Vainio | Finland | 13:33.6 | Q |
| 3 | Léon Schots | Belgium | 13:34.1 | Q |
| 4 | Jörg Peter | East Germany | 13:34.3 | Q |
| 5 | Boris Kuznetsov | Soviet Union | 13:34.8 | q |
| 6 | Brendan Foster | Great Britain | 13:38.3 | |
| 7 | Knut Kvalheim | Norway | 13:43.6 | |
| 8 | Radhouane Bouster | France | 14:09.3 | |
| 9 | John Charvetto | Gibraltar | 14:18.4 | NR |
| | Karel Gaba | Czechoslovakia | DNF | |

==== Heat 2 ====
| Rank | Name | Nationality | Time | Notes |
|---|---|---|---|---|
| 1 | Karl Fleschen | West Germany | 13:34.45 | Q |
| 2 | Fernando Mamede | Portugal | 13:34.8 | Q |
| 3 | Nick Rose | Great Britain | 13:35.7 | Q |
| 4 | Enn Sellik | Soviet Union | 13:36.2 | Q |
| 5 | Gerard Tebroke | Netherlands | 13:37.0 | |
| 6 | Fernando Cerrada | Spain | 13:40.4 | |
| 7 | Pierre Levisse | France | 13:44.1 | |
| 8 | Stanislav Tábor | Czechoslovakia | 13:45.0 | |
| 9 | Dietmar Millonig | Austria | 13:50.4 | |
| 10 | Necdet Ayaz | Turkey | 13:55.7 | |
| | Justin Gloden | Luxembourg | DNF | |

==== Heat 3 ====
| Rank | Name | Nationality | Time | Notes |
|---|---|---|---|---|
| 1 | Aleksandr Fedotkin | Soviet Union | 13:24.10 | Q |
| 2 | Markus Ryffel | Switzerland | 13:24.71 | Q |
| 3 | Venanzio Ortis | Italy | 13:26.67 | Q |
| 4 | John Treacy | Ireland | 13:28.85 | Q |
| 5 | Christoph Herle | West Germany | 13:30.59 | q |
| 6 | Ilie Floroiu | Romania | 13:32.5 | q |
| 7 | Mike McLeod | Great Britain | 13:42.9 | |
| 8 | Jerzy Kowol | Poland | 13:49.1 | |
| 9 | Aniceto Simões | Portugal | 13:52.1 | |
| 10 | Willy Polleunis | Belgium | 14:24.5 | |
| | Klaas Lok | Netherlands | DNF | |

== Participation ==
According to an unofficial count, 32 athletes from 21 countries participated in the event.

- Austria (1)
- Belgium (2)
- Czechoslovakia (2)
- East Germany (1)
- Finland (1)
- France (2)
- Gibraltar (1)
- Ireland (1)
- Italy (1)
- Luxembourg (1)
- Netherlands (2)
- Norway (1)
- Poland (1)
- Portugal (2)
- Romania (1)
- Soviet Union (3)
- Spain (1)
- Switzerland (1)
- Turkey (1)
- Great Britain (3)
- West Germany (3)
