= One hour run =

Athletics discipline

Athletics One hour run

World records
- Men: (United Kingdom) Mohamed Farah 21,330 metres (13.25 mi) (2020)
- Women: (Netherlands) Sifan Hassan 18,930 metres (11.76 mi) (2020)

The one hour run is an athletics event in which competitors try to cover as much distance as possible within one hour. While officially recognized by World Athletics as a track event, it is rarely contested apart from occasional world record attempts.

The event has a long history, with first recorded races dating back to the late 17th century. The first athlete to run more than 20 kilometers in one hour was Emil Zátopek, in September 1951. Zátopek also set the 20,000 metres world record in the same race. Since that time, most men's 20,000 m world records were also set en route to one hour world records.

The men's world record is 21,330 metres (13.25 mi), set by Mo Farah, while the women's world record is 18,930 metres (11.76 mi), set by Sifan Hassan. Both were set on 4 September 2020 during the 2020 Diamond League Ivo Van Damme Memorial.

== Men's world record progression ==
Distance (m)	Athlete	Country	Place	Date
18,742	Alfred Shrubb	Great Britain	Glasgow	1904-11-05
19,021	Jean Bouin	France	Stockholm	1913-07-06
19,210	Paavo Nurmi	Finland	Berlin	1928-10-07
19,339	Viljo Heino	Finland	Turku	1945-09-30
19,558	Emil Zátopek	Czechoslovakia	Prague	1951-09-15
20,052	Emil Zátopek	Czechoslovakia	Stará Boleslav	1951-09-29
20,190	Bill Baillie	New Zealand	Auckland	1963-08-24
20,232	Ron Clarke	Australia	Geelong	1965-10-27
20,664	Gaston Roelants	Belgium	Leuven	1966-10-28
20,784	Gaston Roelants	Belgium	Brussels	1972-09-20
20,907	Jos Hermens	Netherlands	Papendal	1975-09-28
20,944	Jos Hermens	Netherlands	Papendal	1976-05-01
21,101	Arturo Barrios	Mexico	La Flèche	1991-03-30
21,285	Haile Gebrselassie	Ethiopia	Ostrava	2007-06-27
21,330	Mo Farah	United Kingdom	Brussels	2020-09-04

== Women's world record progression ==
Distance (m)	Athlete	Country	Place	Date
18,084	Silvana Cruciata	Italy	Rome	1981-05-02
18,340	Tegla Loroupe	Kenya	Borgholzhausen	1998-08-07
18,517	Dire Tune	Ethiopia	Ostrava	2008-06-12
18,930	Sifan Hassan	Netherlands	Brussels	2020-09-04

== All-time top 25 ==
=== Men ===
- Updated September 2022.

Rank	Result (m)	Athlete	Nation	Date	Place	Ref.
1	21,330	Mo Farah	Great Britain	4 September 2020	Brussels	
2	21,322	Bashir Abdi	Belgium	4 September 2020	Brussels	
3	21,285	Haile Gebrselassie	Ethiopia	27 June 2007	Ostrava	
4	21,250	Sabastian Sawe	Kenya	2 September 2022	Brussels	
5	21,131	Sondre Nordstad Moen	Norway	7 August 2020	Kristiansand	
6	21,101	Arturo Barrios	Mexico	30 March 1991	La Flèche	
7	20,944	Jos Hermens	Netherlands	1 May 1976	Papendal	
8	20,943	Dionisio Castro	Portugal	31 March 1990	La Flèche	
9	20,940	Kibiwott Kandie	Kenya	2 September 2022	Brussels	
10	20,855	Carl Thackery	Great Britain	31 March 1990	La Flèche	
11	20,797	Kiplimo Kimutai	Kenya	1 June 2009	Hengelo	
12	20,784	Gaston Roelants	Belgium	20 September 1972	Brussels	
13	20,772	Morhad Amdouni	France	19 September 2020	Lucciana	
14	20,756	Wilson Kiprop	Kenya	1 June 2009	Hengelo	
15	20,639	Samuel Nyangincha	Kenya	30 March 1991	La Flèche	
16	20,620	Godfrey Kiprotich	Kenya	30 March 1991	La Flèche	
17	20,601	Bertrand Itsweire	France	31 March 1990	La Flèche	
18	20,593	Daniel Mateo	Spain	20 April 2021	La Nucía	
19	20,587	Peter Kiprotich	Kenya	19 September 2020	Lucciana	
20	20,550	Gerard Tebroke	Netherlands	28 September 1978	Groningen	
21	20,547	Bill Rodgers	United States	9 August 1977	Boston	
22	20,536	Werner Schildhauer	Germany	29 April 1983	Cottbus	
23	20,525	Hansjörg Kunze	Germany	31 March 1990	La Flèche	
24	20,518	Willy Polleunis	Belgium	20 September 1972	Brussels	
25	20,516	Rob de Castella	Australia	17 April 1982	Rome	

=== Women ===
- Updated September 2020.
- Mx = Mixed race

Rank	Result (m)	Athlete	Nation	Date	Place	Ref.
1	18,930	Sifan Hassan	Netherlands	4 September 2020	Brussels	
2	18,571	Lonah Chemtai Salpeter	Israel	4 September 2020	Brussels	
3	18,517	Dire Tune	Ethiopia	12 June 2008	Ostrava	
4	18,341	Eva Cherono	Kenya	4 September 2020	Brussels	
5	18,340	Tegla Loroupe	Kenya	7 August 1998	Borgholzhausen	
6	18,084	Silvana Cruciata	Italy	4 May 1981	Rome	
7	18,027	Rosa Mota	Portugal	14 May 1983	Lisbon	
8	17,974	Helen Bekele	Ethiopia	4 September 2020	Brussels	
9	17,955	Sarah Lahti	Sweden	4 September 2020	Brussels	
10	17,952	Junko Kataoka	Japan	1 October 1994	Tokyo	
11	17,930	Molly Huddle	United States	1 November 2020	Attleboro	
12	17,871	Naomi Sakashita	Japan	10 October 1995	Amagasaki	
13	17,776	Jeļena Prokopčuka	Latvia	8 August 2003	Riga	
14	17,709	Katrin Dörre-Heinig	East Germany	7 July 1988	Leipzig	
15	17,693	Izumi Maki	Japan	1 October 1994	Tokyo	
16	17,692	Midori Fumoto	Japan	1 October 1994	Tokyo	
17	17,569	Annmarie Tuxbury	United States	1 November 2020	Attleboro	
18	17,546	Marta Galimany	Spain	4 September 2020	Brussels	
19	17,545	Alice Jepkemboi Kimutai	Kenya	17 June 2014	Ostrava	
20	17,544	Muluhabt Tsega	Ethiopia	17 June 2014	Ostrava	
21	17,343	Leah Malot	Kenya	16 June 2009	Ostrava	
22	17,335	Elena Loyo	Spain	4 September 2020	Brussels	
23	17,332 Mx	Valerie Duvialard	France	23 March 1996	Rouen	
24	17,330	Julia Mombi Muraga	Kenya	17 June 2014	Ostrava	
25	17,323	Likina Amebaw	Ethiopia	4 September 2020	Brussels	
