= 1982 European Athletics Championships – Men's 5000 metres =

Men's 5000 metres at the European Athletics Championships

These are the official results of the Men's 5,000 metres event at the 1982 European Championships in Athens, Greece, held at Olympic Stadium "Spiros Louis" on 8 and 11 September 1982.

== Medalists ==
Gold	Thomas Wessinghage; West Germany
Silver	Werner Schildhauer; East Germany
Bronze	Dave Moorcroft; United Kingdom

=== Final ===
11 September The 5,000-metre final was characterized by a variable, but mostly slow, pace and by heavy rain. The strongest pre-final favourite and the fresh world record holder at this distance, David Moorcroft, took the lead shortly after the start. Before the 600-metre mark, his teammate Mike McLeod went into the lead, perhaps to spare Moorcroft from leading too long. McLeod passed 1,000 metres in a sluggish time of 2:46.91. Before the 1,200-metre mark, Finland's tall Martti Vainio accelerated into the lead. He was passed after 1,900 metres by Moorcroft, who led the 15-man field through 2,000 metres in 5:28.89. For some reason, however, Moorcroft slowed the pace down, with 3,000 metres being passed in a slow time of 8:16.55. As the tightly bunched group of runners was approaching 3,200 metres, East Germany's Hansjörg Kunze, one of the pre-race favourites, was pushed, lost his rhythm for a moment, and accidentally ran a few steps on the field. McLeod went into the lead again, somewhat increasing the pace. At 3,400 metres, Vainio accelerated into the lead, and sprinted the following 200 metres in under 31 seconds. However, his legs were tired of the 10,000-metre final and his rather fast 5,000-metre heat, and he was forced to slow down. Around 3,800 metres, there was another shoving match, involving Italy's Alberto Cova and Austria's Dietmar Millonig. Cova pushed Millonig so strongly, after having been pushed or elbowed by a third runner, that he was disqualified after the final. At 4,000 metres, Vainio still led the field in 10:57.19. Around this time, Sweden's Mats Erixon began gradually to lose contact with the main group. Before the 4,200-metre mark, Moorcroft went into the lead again, intending to gradually increase the pace before the final lap. After 4,400 metres, West Germany's Christoph Herle dropped from the lead group. Before 4,500 metres, the Soviet Union's Dmitriy Dmitriyev passed Moorcroft, who was soon surrounded by several other runners. Also Switzerland's Markus Ryffel dropped from the lead group before 4,600 metres, while Cova, McLeod and Kunze began to struggle. At 4,600 metres, Dmitriyev still led the main group in 12:34.25. Soon after that, East Germany's Werner Schildhauer passed him. Before 4,750 metres, West Germany's Thomas Wessinghage sprinted past Schildhauer, and already opened a five-metre gap by 4,800 metres. Moorcroft accelerated into the second place, followed by his other teammate Tim Hutchings. By the start of the home straight, Wessinghage's lead was at least eight or nine metres. With over 20 metres left, Schildhauer passed Moorcroft, to claim the silver medal. Hutchings faded into seventh place, while Bulgaria's Evgeni Ignatov rose to fourth place with a strong final kick. (Two Finnish sports books: Our Sports' Face/Urheilumme kasvot, Helsinki: c.1982; Sports Information/Urheilutieto, Helsinki: c.1982; YouTube: user tommytempo1's two videos: European Athletics Championships 3,000m Steeplechase & 5,000m Finals Athens 1982; Thomas Wessinghage – European Athletics Championships 5,000m Athens 1982.)

Rank	Name	Nationality	Time	Notes
1st place, gold medalist(s)	Thomas Wessinghage	West Germany	13:28.90	
2nd place, silver medalist(s)	Werner Schildhauer	East Germany	13:30.03	
3rd place, bronze medalist(s)	Dave Moorcroft	United Kingdom	13:30.42	
4	Evgeni Ignatov	Bulgaria	13:30.95	
5	Dietmar Millonig	Austria	13:31.03	
6	Valeriy Abramov	Soviet Union	13:31.26	
7	Tim Hutchings	United Kingdom	13:31.83	
8	Martti Vainio	Finland	13:33.69	
9	Hansjörg Kunze	East Germany	13:35.71	
10	Markus Ryffel	Switzerland	13:36.11	
11	Dmitriy Dmitriyev	Soviet Union	13:37.91	
12	Mike McLeod	United Kingdom	13:38.99	
13	Christoph Herle	West Germany	13:45.54	
14	Mats Erixon	Sweden	13:52.39	
	Alberto Cova	Italy	DQ	

=== Heats ===
8 September

==== Heat 1 ====
Rank	Name	Nationality	Time	Notes
1	Dave Moorcroft	United Kingdom	13:30.28	Q
2	Werner Schildhauer	East Germany	13:30.49	Q
3	Dietmar Millonig	Austria	13:30.61	Q
4	Markus Ryffel	Switzerland	13:30.75	Q
5	Valeriy Abramov	Soviet Union	13:30.98	Q
6	Christoph Herle	West Germany	13:31.06	Q
7	António Leitão	Portugal	13:31.89	
8	Salvatore Antibo	Italy	13:34.43	
9	Viktor Chumakov	Soviet Union	13:34.50	
10	Knut Kvalheim	Norway	13:41.85	
11	Hans Segerfeldt	Sweden	13:44.07	
12	Alex Hagelsteens	Belgium	13:50.03	
13	Philippe Legrand	France	13:55.04	
14	Henrik Jørgensen	Denmark	14:14.05	
	Pär Wallin	Sweden	DNF	

==== Heat 2 ====
Rank	Name	Nationality	Time	Notes
1	Thomas Wessinghage	West Germany	13:26.48	Q
2	Hansjörg Kunze	East Germany	13:27.45	Q
3	Tim Hutchings	United Kingdom	13:27.58	Q
4	Alberto Cova	Italy	13:27.65	Q
5	Evgeni Ignatov	Bulgaria	13:27.78	Q
6	Mats Erixon	Sweden	13:28.08	Q
7	Dmitriy Dmitriyev	Soviet Union	13:28.45	q
8	Martti Vainio	Finland	13:29.20	q
9	Mike McLeod	United Kingdom	13:29.90	q
10	Fotios Kourtis	Greece	14:22.18	
	Francis Gonzalez	France	DNF	

== Participation ==
According to an unofficial count, 26 athletes from 16 countries participated in the event.

- Austria (1)
- Belgium (1)
- Bulgaria (1)
- Denmark (1)
- East Germany (2)
- Finland (1)
- France (2)
- Greece (1)
- Italy (2)
- Norway (1)
- Portugal (1)
- Soviet Union (3)
- Sweden (3)
- Switzerland (1)
- United Kingdom (3)
- West Germany (2)

== See also ==
- 1978 Men's European Championships 5,000 metres (Prague)
- 1980 Men's Olympic 5,000 metres (Moscow)
- 1983 Men's World Championships 5,000 metres (Helsinki)
- 1984 Men's Olympic 5,000 metres (Los Angeles)
- 1986 Men's European Championships 5,000 metres (Stuttgart)
- 1987 Men's World Championships 5,000 metres (Rome)
