= 1986 European Athletics Championships – Men's 10,000 metres =

Men's 10,000 metres at the European Athletics Championships

These are the official results of the Men's 10,000 metres event at the 1986 European Championships in Stuttgart, West Germany. The final was held at Neckarstadion on 26 August 1986.

== Medalists ==
Gold	Stefano Mei; Italy
Silver	Alberto Cova; Italy
Bronze	Salvatore Antibo; Italy

== Final ==
Rank	Final	Time
	Stefano Mei (ITA)	27:56.79
	Alberto Cova (ITA)	27:57.93
	Salvatore Antibo (ITA)	28:00.25
4.	Mats Erixon (SWE)	28:01.50
5.	Domingos Castro (POR)	28:01.62
6.	John Treacy (IRL)	28:04.10
7.	Martti Vainio (FIN)	28:08.72
8.	Jean-Louis Prianon (FRA)	28:12.29
9.	Gerhard Hartmann (AUT)	28:16.25
10.	Steven Harris (GBR)	28:16.79
11.	Dionisio Castro (POR)	28:17.46
12.	Steve Binns (GBR)	28:17.90
13.	Ivan Uvizl (TCH)	28:20.86
14.	Carl Thackery (GBR)	28:33.63
15.	Christoph Herle (FRG)	28:44.10
16.	Lubomír Tesáček (TCH)	28:48.61
17.	Lars-Erik Nilsson (SWE)	28:59.41
18.	Santiago Llorente (ESP)	29:00.42
19.	Mehmet Yurdadön (TUR)	29:23.35
20.	Geir Kvernmo (NOR)	29:34.17
21.	Ezequiel Canario (POR)	32:10.46
	Cor Lambregts (NED)	DNF
	Paul Arpin (FRA)	DNF
	Hansjörg Kunze (GDR)	DNF

== Participation ==
According to an unofficial count, 24 athletes from 15 countries participated in the event.

- Austria (1)
- Czechoslovakia (2)
- East Germany (1)
- Finland (1)
- France (2)
- Ireland (1)
- Italy (3)
- Netherlands (1)
- Norway (1)
- Portugal (3)
- Spain (1)
- Sweden (2)
- Turkey (1)
- United Kingdom (3)
- West Germany (1)

== See also ==
- 1982 Men's European Championships 10,000 metres (Athens)
- 1983 Men's World Championships 10,000 metres (Helsinki)
- 1984 Men's Olympic 10,000 metres (Los Angeles)
- 1987 Men's World Championships 10,000 metres (Rome)
- 1988 Men's Olympic 10,000 metres (Seoul)
- 1990 Men's European Championships 10,000 metres (Split)
