= Venanzio Ortis =

Italian long-distance runner

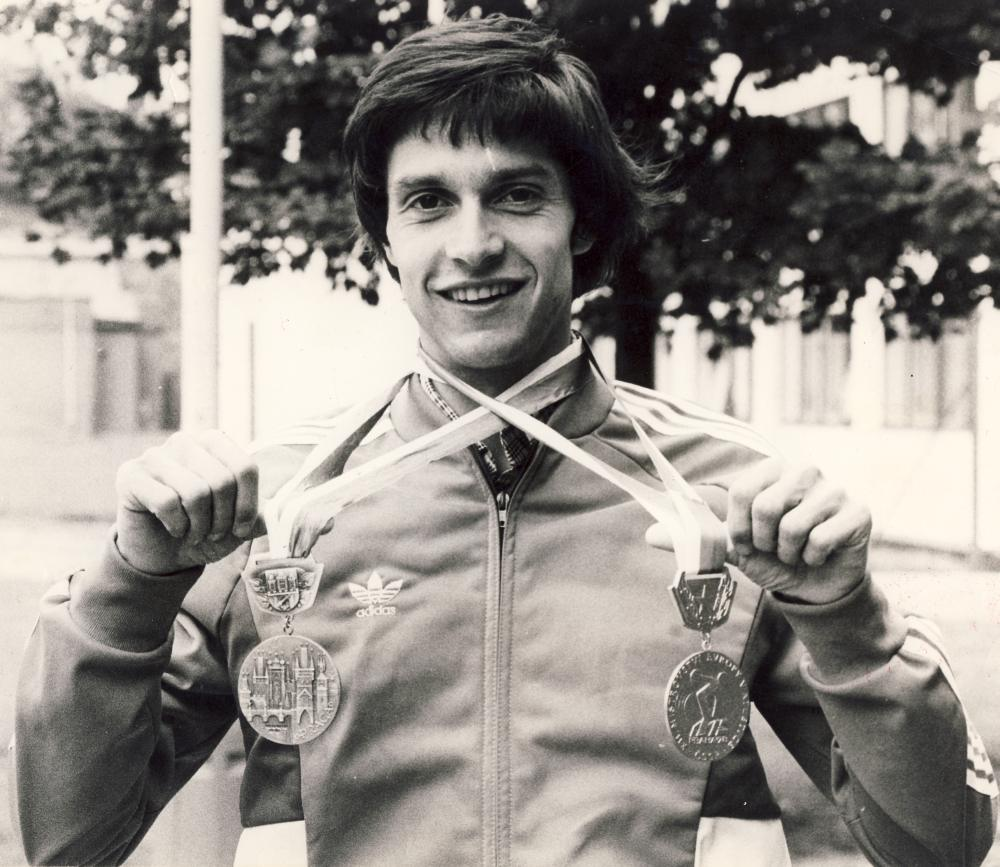
- Venanzio Ortis with the two medal won at the 1978 European Championships

Personal information
- Nationality: Italian
- Born: 29 January 1955 (age 71) Paluzza
- Height: 1.78 m (5 ft 10 in)
- Weight: 64 kg (141 lb)

Sport
- Country: Italy
- Sport: Athletics
- Event: Long-distance running
- Club: G.S. Fiamme Oro

Achievements and titles
- Personal bests: 5000 m: 13:19.19 (1978); 10,000 m: 27:31.48 (1978)
Medal record
Men's athletics
Representing Italy
European Championships
Gold medal – first place	1978 Prague	5000 m
Silver medal – second place	1978 Prague	10,000 m
Mediterranean Games
Silver medal – second place	1983 Casablanca	10,000 metres
World Cross Country Championships
Silver medal – second place	1974 Monza	Junior individual
Bronze medal – third place	1974 Monza	Junior team

Venanzio Ortis (born 29 January 1955) is an Italian retired long-distance runner who won two medals at the 1978 European Championships.

== Biography ==
Ortis was born in Paluzza, province of Udine. He started racing in 1969 (for a period he also practiced cross-country skiing), and later won the Italian junior titles in the 1000 and 3000 m races. On 16 August 1978, aged 23, he set a new Italian record in the 5000 m at the Weltklasse Zürich, obtaining a third place behind Henry Rono and Markus Ryffel. In the fast 10,000-metre race of the 1978 European Athletics Championships, held in Prague two weeks later, he broke 28 minutes for the first time while finishing second in 27 minutes 31.48 seconds, just four one-hundredths of a second ahead of Aleksandr Antipov of the Soviet Union, and half a second behind Finland's Martti Vainio (see, for example, Tapio Pekola et al., eds., EM-Praha 1978 (European Championships in Prague 1978), Kaarina, Finland: Juoksija-lehti (Runner Magazine), 1978). In the slow and tactical 5,000-metre final, he managed to squeeze through the narrow space between Ryffel and the Soviet Union's Aleksandr Fedotkin to sprint to the lead and win by 0.1 seconds. He missed the 1980 Moscow Olympics due to injury. His last major international track race was the 1981 IAAF World Cup event in Rome, where he placed fourth in 10,000. Plagued by physical problems, Ortis retired in 1983.

He is the cousin of the Italian cross-country skier Manuela Di Centa.

== Achievements ==
Year	Competition	Venue	Position	Event	Time	Notes
1974	World Junior Cross Country Championships	(Italy) Monza	2nd	Junior race		
1976	World Cross Country Championships	(United Kingdom) Chepstow	14th	Individual race	35:36	
1976	World Cross Country Championships	(United Kingdom) Chepstow	5th	Long course team	224 pts	
1976	Olympic Games	(Canada) Montreal	Heat	5000 m	13:52.40	
1978	European Championships	(Czechoslovakia) Prague	1st	5000 m	13:28.52	
1978	European Championships	(Czechoslovakia) Prague	2nd	10,000 m	27:31.48	
1983	World Cross Country Championships	(United Kingdom) Gateshead	7th	Long course team		

== National titles ==
He won five times the national championships at senior level.

- Italian Athletics Championships
  - 5000 metres: 1977
  - 10,000 metres: 1976, 1978
  - Cross country (12 km): 1980
- Italian Athletics Indoor Championships
  - 3000 metres: 1978

== See also ==
- FIDAL Hall of Fame
