= Martti Vainio =

Finnish long-distance runner

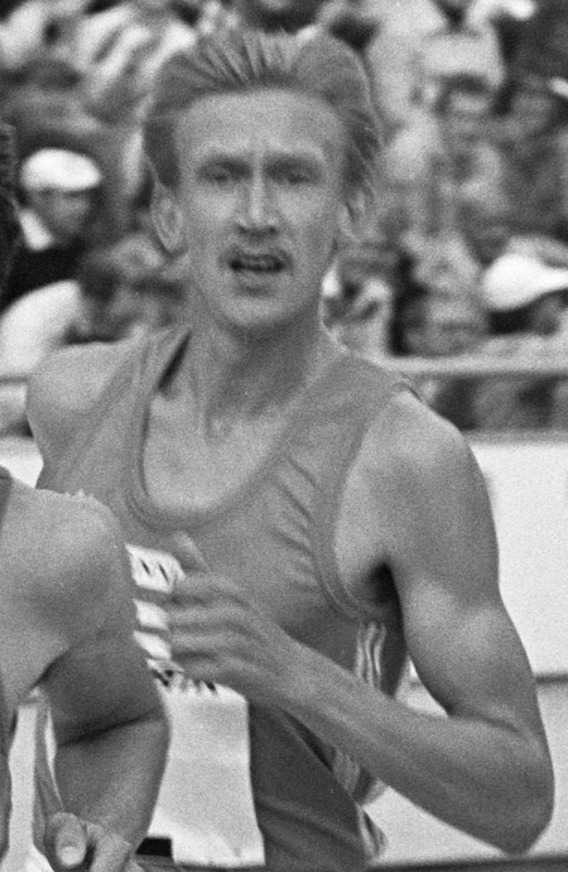
- Vainio in 1980

Personal information
- Full name: Martti Olavi Vainio
- Nationality: Finnish
- Born: Martti Vainio; 30 December 1950 (age 75) Vehkalahti, Finland
- Height: 1.92 m (6 ft 4 in)
- Weight: 72 kg (159 lb; 11.3 st)

Sport
- Country: Finland
- Sport: Running
- Event: Long-distance
- Club: Turun Urheiluliitto 1972–82; Lapuan Virkiä 1983–84; Saarijärven Pullistus 1986–88
- Coached by: Aulis Potinkara 1971–82
- Retired: 1988

Achievements and titles
- Olympic finals: 1976: 10,000m 8h1 1980: 5000 m 11th 1980: 10,000 m 13th 1984: 5000 m DNS; 1984: 10,000 m DSQ
- World finals: 1983: 5000 m 3rd 1983: 10,000 m 4th 1987: 10,000 m DNF; 1987: Marathon DNF
- Regional finals: 1978: 5000 m 6th 1978: 10,000 m 1st 1982: 5000 m 8th 1982: 10,000 m 3rd 1986: 5000 m 6th 1986: 10,000 m 7th
- Highest world ranking: 5000 m: 4th (1983); 10,000 m: 2nd (1978)
- Personal bests: 1500 m: 3:41.09 (1983); 3000 m: 7:46.24 (1982); 5000 m: 13:20.07 (1983); 10,000 m: 27:30.99 (1978, NR); Marathon: 2:16:41 (1986)
Medal record
Men's athletics
Representing Finland
Olympic Games
Disqualified	1984 Los Angeles	10,000 m
World Championships
Bronze medal – third place	1983 Helsinki	5000 m
European Championships
Gold medal – first place	1978 Prague	10,000 m
Bronze medal – third place	1982 Athens	10 000 m

Martti Olavi Vainio (born 30 December 1950) is a Finnish former long-distance runner. In Finland he is recognized as the last of the great runners of the famous "V-line", the previous ones being Juha Väätäinen, Lasse Virén, and Pekka Vasala. Each of them won at least one gold medal either at the Summer Olympics or the European Athletics Championships in the 1970s. Vainio's accomplishments are tarnished though, for testing positive for PEDs on at least two occasions. One of those events was the 1984 Olympic Games where he was disqualified and stripped of his medal and later suspended from sport.

His achievements in major athletic championships include gold in the 10,000 metres race at the 1978 European Championships in Athletics in Prague and bronze in the same distance at the 1982 European Championships in Athletics in Athens. At the 1983 World Championships in Athletics he finished in fourth place in the 10,000 metres race, but claimed the bronze in the 5000 metres in a close finish decided by a lunge over the finish line.

== Career ==
=== Early career 1972–77 ===
Martti Vainio started systematic training at the age of 20 in the autumn of 1971 with his coach Aulis Potinkara. He received his first national championships medal in 1974 when he finished third in 5000 metres after Seppo Tuominen and Rune Holmén. In the same year he ran his first 10,000 m race with the result 29:09.6. He broke the 29-minutes barrier for the first time in 1976. The same year he was second at the Finnish Championships in Athletics in 10,000 metres after Pekka Päivärinta and was selected to his first Olympics in Montreal, Quebec, Canada. However, he did not qualify for the 10,000 metres final, finishing as the second fastest runner to be eliminated from the final. He won his first Finnish Championship in 1977 when he beat Kaarlo Maaninka by 0.9 seconds in 10,000 metres.

=== Years of success 1978–82 ===
Vainio used strategy in the 1978 European Championships 10,000 metres race, spending most of the race drifting off the lead pack until the 8,500-metre mark. Due to the fast and steady pace, the other runners – some of them presumably better kickers than Vainio – had exhausted themselves, and Vainio only needed to sprint the last lap in 58.4 seconds to win the race. Especially notable was Brendan Foster falling from the lead to fourth place in the last 130 metres. His winning time 27:30.99 improved his personal best by 28.7 seconds. Later at the same championships Vainio was sixth in the 5,000 metres race. At the Track & Field News annual world ranking Vainio was second in 10,000 metres after world record breaker Henry Rono, and tenth in 5000 metres.

Because of his international breakthrough, Vainio was one of the potential gold medal candidates prior to the 1980 Summer Olympics. Vainio was also known for his tough training programs, and during the winter 1980 he ran over 300 kilometres per week during his four-month-long training camp in New Zealand. Later believing he had overtrained and suffered some unspecified stomach problems, Vainio did not succeed at the 1980 Summer Olympics in Moscow, finishing 13th in the 10,000 metres final and 11th in the 5,000 metres final.

Despite the disappointment of the Olympics, Vainio returned to the top of the world in 1981 in the 10,000 metres. He won the Bislett Games in Oslo in 27:45.50 and represented Europe at the 1981 IAAF World Cup in Rome, finishing fifth running a 27:48.62. At the Track & Field News annual world ranking he was fourth after Werner Schildhauer, Geoff Smith, and Mohamed Kedir.

In the following year 1982, Vainio succeeded again at the European Championships in Athens, where he won a bronze medal behind Alberto Cova and Werner Schildhauer in 10,000 metres running a 27:42.51. He competed in 5,000 metres as well and finished 8th. At the Track & Field News annual world ranking, Vainio end of year ranking was seventh in 10,000 metres.

=== World Championships in Helsinki 1983 ===
After the 1982 season, collaboration between Vainio and coach Potinkara ended amicably and Vainio started to train by himself. However, certain people started to influence his training; among them was Jouko Elevaara, known as the coach of Kaarlo Maaninka. Vainio has stated that he started to use hormones in the autumn of 1982 to avoid the detrimental effects of overtraining in his preparation for the first World Championships in Helsinki, the capital of his home country, Finland. According to Vainio, the first hormone ampullas were obtained from Palermo in the autumn of 1982.

The 10,000 metres final was held on the third day of the Helsinki Championships. It was a slow race which was decided in the last lap. Vainio finished fourth with the time 28:01.37, missing the gold medal by only 0.33 seconds and bronze by 0.11 seconds. The home audience was very impressed with his achievement, since they knew slow-paced races were not his best strategically. The gold medal was won again by Alberto Cova.

The 5000 metres final was held on the final day of the Championships. Vainio delighted the Finnish audience with a bronze medal. The tight race again culminated in the final metres with Eamonn Coghlan as the overwhelming champion. As in the 10,000 metres race, Werner Schildhauer took the silver, beating Vainio by 0.14 seconds. Vainio won his bronze medal in an extraordinary way; he flung himself in the last 5 metres and fell flat on his face. As a result, he beat Dmitriy Dmitriyev, who was fourth, by 0.04 seconds. Vainio considers this race to be the most sentimental event in his career.

After the Championships, Vainio competed in Weltklasse Zürich and finished fourth in 5000 metres with his personal best 13:20.07. At the Track & Field News annual world ranking, Vainio was fourth in 5000 metres and seventh in 10,000 metres.

=== Doping case at the Olympics 1984 ===
In 1984, Vainio started his season by finishing third at the Rotterdam Marathon with a personal record of 2:13:04. After the race he was drug tested organized by the Finnish Athletics Association. The test did not have official status and was merely considered to be a control test to help Finnish athletes avoid getting caught testing positive for doping in international championships. Therefore, only an A-sample was taken and not a B-sample, which is only used to confirm if a positive result came from the A-sample. Vainio's A-sample tested positive for anabolic steroids with no B-sample to confirm it. So the head coach of the Finnish Athletics Federation, Antti Lanamäki, delegated Timo Vuorimaa, the head coach of long-distance runners, to inform Vainio about the test result. Vuorimaa informed Vainio only by mentioning that there was something strange in his test sample, not providing detailed information about the substance. Vainio believed that he had only been using testosterone and not anabolic steroids at all. Therefore, he decided in the future to stop administering the drug earlier so it would be out of his system prior to anticipated tests.

In June 1984, he competed five times in the 5000 metres, the weakest result being 13:30.40, and once in 10,000 metres with his second best PR result 27:41.75. At the Bislett Games on 28 June, he broke Lasse Virén's Finnish record in 5000 metres and finished second after Fernando Mamede with a time of 13:16.02. In July, he competed only three times; twice in the Finnish Championships on 6–8 July in Kajaani, where he took the gold medals in both the 5000 (13:24.99) and 10,000 metres (28:06.85), and the third time improving his 3000 metres record to 7:44.42 in Varkaus on 12 July. According to a Vainio interview in 2004, he took his next injection after the Rotterdam Marathon around 10 July, and was sure that this time period would be long enough to allow metabolism to take its effect and ensure a negative test at the Olympics.

10,000 metres final was run on 6 August. Vainio took the lead after 5700 metres and only Alberto Cova was able to follow him. When the final lap started, these two runners were well over 100 metres ahead of the other runners. This time, however, Vainio was not able to challenge Cova, who took the gold with the time 27:47.54. Vainio won silver with the time 27:51.10. Mike McLeod was third with a time of 28:06.22. Vainio also qualified for the 5000 metres final, but was disqualified after testing positive for Metenolone following the 10,000 metres final. His cheating caused him to be stripped of his medal and a lifetime ban.

Vainio's positive test result was a big scandal and provoked public indignation. Although Vainio's positive doping test after the Rotterdam Marathon was unofficial because of the missing B-sample, the failed drug test at the Olympics forced Finnish Athletics Association to disqualify all of Vainio's results after Rotterdam in 1984 and to discharge Antti Lanamäki from his duties. Vainio himself did not want to provide detailed information about the incident because he, himself was still investigating the reasons for the positive test result. Finnish mass media demanded an explanation, and one story released to the public alleged that Vainio's training partner, janitor Alpo Nyrönen, had given Vainio a hormone injection by accident, instead of the intended Vitamin B injection. Vainio himself released the explanation about the confusion between anabolic steroids and testosterone only several years after the incident.

There is still some speculation and controversy around the Olympics 10,000 metres race. Alberto Cova later confessed the use of blood doping in his career and therefore Mike McLeod, originally third at the finish line, claims he should be awarded the gold medal. However, Vainio considers himself to be the second best runner in the 10,000 metres race despite his failed drug tests.

Although the Finnish Athletics Association disqualified all of Vainio's results from the summer of 1984, he was still internationally recognized. At the Track & Field News annual world ranking, he was fourth in 10,000 metres and eighth in 5000 metres.

=== Return to the track, 1986–88 ===
Initially, Vainio received a lifelong ban from competitive athletics, but after the Finnish Athletics Association made a plea for a reprieve, it was shortened to 18 months. In 1986, Vainio returned to the track and ran 10,000 metres at the Bislett Games in 27:44.57. At the European Championships, he placed seventh in the 10,000 metres final with a time 28:08.72 and sixth in the 5000 metres final with the time 13:22.67. At the Track and Field News annual world ranking, Vainio was sixth in 10,000 metres.

In 1987 Vainio concentrated on 10,000 metres and ran 27:42.65 in Helsinki on 2 July. The World Championships 10,000 metres race ended in a farce. The first half of the race was slow, 5000 metres lap time being only 14:13.07. At 5800 metres, Paul Kipkoech changed pace and left other runners behind. Francesco Panetta, Salvatore Antibo and Vainio started their pursuit a little bit later and were not able to properly challenge Kipkoech. Subsequently, Kipkoech was far ahead of the other runners and the officials decremented the lap table, which displays the remaining laps for the runners, immediately after Kipkoech passed the finish line after each round. As a result, Vainio and some other runners became confused about the remaining laps, started their sprint 400 metres too early and finished the race after 9600 metres. Some runners continued the race after their "first finish", but Vainio was too tired to realize the situation. Vainio also competed in the Marathon but did not finish. At the Track & Field News annual world ranking, Vainio was recognized as the seventh best runner in 10,000 metres.

In 1988 Vainio ran 10,000 metres in 28:02.04 at the Bislett Games, but that was not enough to convince the Finnish Olympic Committee, and he was not picked for the Olympics team.

=== Masters World Records 1991 ===
Vainio returned to the track once again in 1991. He ran the age group M40 Masters world record in 3000 meters 8:05.08 in Mikkeli on 12 June. Later, he also improved the 10,000 metres world record 28:30.88 at the Fanny Blankers-Koen Games in Hengelo on 25 June. At the World Masters Athletics Championships in Turku, he won the M40 10,000 metres with the result 29:16.88.

== Trivia ==
During his career (1974–91) Vainio competed 80 times in 10,000 metres. He ran 68 times below the 29-minute barrier, 24 times below 28:10, and 10 times below 28 minutes.

Vainio's winning time at the 1978 European Championships in Prague – 27:30.99 – is still the Finnish record and was the European Championship record until it was broken in 2026.

Vainio's 10,000 metres time 28:30.58 in 1991 is still the World record of the age group M40.

He won five Finnish Championships in 5000 metres (1978, 1980, 1981, 1982, and 1987) and nine in 10,000 metres (1977, 1978, 1980, 1981, 1982, 1983, 1986, 1987 and 1988). He won the Finnish Championship in cross country running four times in 1981, 1983, 1986 and 1987.

After his sports career, he worked in the travel industry.

Martti Vainio is not related to long-distance runner Alisa Vainio and their family names have different origins.

== See also ==
- Use of performance-enhancing drugs in the Olympic Games
- List of doping cases in sport
