= 1987 World Championships in Athletics – Men's 10,000 metres =

The men's 10,000 metres event featured at the 1987 World Championships in Rome, Italy. There were a total number of 30 participating athletes, with the final being held on 29 August 1987. The winning margin was 10.35 seconds. As of 2024, this is the only time the men's 10,000 metres has been won by more than four seconds at these championships.

== Medalists ==
Gold	Paul Kipkoech; Kenya (KEN)
Silver	Francesco Panetta; Italy (ITA)
Bronze	Hansjörg Kunze; East Germany (GDR)

== Records ==
Existing records at the start of the event.

World Record	Fernando Mamede (POR)	27:13.81	Stockholm, Sweden	July 2, 1984
Championship Record	Fernando Mamede (POR)	27:45.54	Helsinki, Finland	August 7, 1983

== Final ==
RANK	FINAL	TIME
	Paul Kipkoech (KEN)	27:38.63 CR
	Francesco Panetta (ITA)	27:48.98
	Hansjörg Kunze (GDR)	27:50.37
4.	Arturo Barrios (MEX)	27:59.66
5.	Steve Binns (GBR)	28:03.08
6.	Martin Vrabel (TCH)	28:05.59
7.	Spyros Andriopoulos (GRE)	28:07.17 NR
8.	Steve Plasencia (USA)	28:11.38
9.	Jean-Louis Prianon (FRA)	28:19.47
10.	Rolando Vera (ECU)	28:20.24
11.	Ezequiel Canario (POR)	28:28.24
12.	Mats Erixon (SWE)	28:29.08
13.	Paul Arpin (FRA)	28:29.21
14.	Zhang Guowei (CHN)	28:30.00
15.	Jon Solly (GBR)	28:31.97
16.	Salvatore Antibo (ITA)	28:33.77
17.	Markus Ryffel (SUI)	28:34.58
18.	Brian Sheriff (ZIM)	28:34.96
19.	Paul McCloy (CAN)	28:41.89
20.	Kozu Akutsu (JPN)	28:45.89
21.	Ed Eyestone (USA)	29:00.33
22.	Some Muge (KEN)	29:06.40
23.	Haji Bulbula (ETH)	29:10.45
24.	Wodajo Bulti (ETH)	29:17.09
25.	Habib Romdhani (TUN)	29:21.35
26.	John Treacy (IRL)	29:22.14
—	Martti Vainio (FIN)	DNF
—	Paul Williams (CAN)	DNF
—	Gerhard Hartmann (AUT)	DNS
—	Gerard Donakowski (USA)	DNS

== See also ==
- 1983 Men's World Championships 10.000 metres (Helsinki)
- 1986 Men's European Championships 10.000 metres (Stuttgart)
- 1988 Men's Olympic 10.000 metres (Seoul)
- 1990 Men's European Championships 10.000 metres (Split)
- 1991 Men's World Championships 10.000 metres (Tokyo)
