= Ed Mendoza =

American long-distance runner

Personal information
- Full name: Edward Eugene Mendoza
- Nationality: American
- Born: December 4, 1952 (age 73)

Sport
- Sport: Long-distance running
- Event: 10,000 metres

Edward Eugene Mendoza (born December 4, 1952) is an American long-distance runner. He competed in the men's 10,000 metres at the 1976 Summer Olympics, as well as the men's marathon at the 1983 World Championships in Athletics.

Mendoza competed for Grossmont College before transferring to the University of Arizona. He was an All-American runner for the Arizona Wildcats track and field team, finishing 7th in the 10,000 meters at the 1976 NCAA Division I Outdoor Track and Field Championships.
