= 1983 World Championships in Athletics – Men's 10,000 metres =

Men's 10,000 metres at the 1983 World Championships
- Venue: Helsinki Olympic Stadium
- Dates: 7 August (heats); 9 August (final)
- Competitors: 37 from 27 nations
- Winning time: 28:01.04

Medalists
gold medal	Alberto Cova	Italy
silver medal	Werner Schildhauer	East Germany
bronze medal	Hansjörg Kunze	East Germany

These are the official results of the men's 10,000 metres event at the 1983 IAAF World Championships in Helsinki, Finland. There were a total number of 37 participating athletes, with two qualifying heats held on Sunday 7 August and the final held on Tuesday 9 August 1983.

The winning margin was 0.14 seconds which as of 2024 remains the only time the men's 10,000 metres was won by less than a quarter of a second at these championships.

== Records ==
Existing records at the start of the event.

World Record	Henry Rono (KEN)	27:22.4	Vienna, Austria	June 11, 1978
Championship Record	New event			

== Summary ==
With the best in the world filtered down to 18 finalists, there was still a traffic jam on the track. In the first 80 metres several athletes were jostled trying to find running room. Christoph Herle and Antonio Prieto found themselves lying on the track. Out of the chaos, Bekele Debele was far back in the string of competitors, speeding down the outside of the backstretch. This culminated with him taking over the lead for a short period of time before Gidamis Shahanga took over the point. Joined by Mohamed Kedir, the three Africans jockeyed for the lead marked most closely by Carlos Lopes. The African pace was not consistent, instead slowing until the field bunched then speeding up to disrupt the even pace most distance runners would prefer. With 6 laps to go, tall, long striding, home favorite Martti Vainio took charge with a 63 second lap, exciting the crowd and forcing the field the change their pace to catch back up. For three laps, Vainio held the lead but was looking for help that was not going to support him. With three laps to go, the pack was bunched tighter than ever, 13 athletes all within 10 metres. Again Kedir took the lead with Lopes almost attached to his shoulder. 50 metres before the bell, the pack was finally disrupted by Werner Schildhauer sprinting out to a 3 metre lead. His East German teammate Hansjörg Kunze and Vaino rushed to cover the break. Shahanga and Alberto Cova were the last to hang on to the breakaway down the final backstretch. With 200 to go, Schildhauer had 3 metres on Kunze who had another 3 metres on Vainio, with Shahanga and Cova respectively another 2 and 4 metres back. Through the final turn, all those distances began to compress. By the time they hit the final straightaway, they were in the same order but with a metre separating each. Each then pulled progressively wider, Cova all the way out to lane 4, so each could have running room for the sprint to the finish. Cova was clearly the faster sprinter, cruising past the field. Schildhauer and Kunze both leaned for the finish way too early, hoping the finish line would arrive sooner. The first four runners separated by a third of a second after 10,000 metres. The result was not exactly a surprise, it was the same result as the European Championships for Cova, Schildhauer, Vainio and 6th place Lopes, a year earlier, with the addition of Kunze and Shahanga. Minus the boycotting East Germans, Cova pulled the same stunt on Vainio in what turned into a match race at the 1984 Olympics. Days later, Vainio was later disqualified for doping.

== Results ==
=== Heats ===
The qualifying heats took place on 7 August, with the 37 athletes involved being split into 2 heats. The first 5 athletes in each heat ( Q ) and the next 8 fastest ( q ) qualified for the final.

Rank	Heat	Name	Nationality	Time	Notes
1	1	Fernando Mamede	Portugal	27:45.54	Q, CR
2	1	Alberto Cova	Italy	27:46.61	Q
3	1	Gidamis Shahanga	Tanzania	27:46.93	Q
4	1	Werner Schildhauer	East Germany	27:47.03	Q
5	1	Antonio Prieto	Spain	27:47.34	Q
6	1	Steve Jones	Great Britain & N.I.	27:47.57	q
7	1	Bekele Debele	Ethiopia	27:49.30	q
8	1	Mark Nenow	United States	27:52.41	q
9	2	Hansjörg Kunze	East Germany	28:04.69	Q
10	2	Carlos Lopes	Portugal	28:05.62	Q
11	2	Nick Rose	Great Britain & N.I.	28:06.05	Q
12	2	Christoph Herle	West Germany	28:06.71	Q
13	1	Henrik Jørgensen	Denmark	28:06.74	q
14	2	Mohamed Kedir	Ethiopia	28:07.16	Q
15	2	Martti Vainio	Finland	28:07.47	q
16	2	José Gómez	Mexico	28:07.57	q
17	2	Bill McChesney	United States	28:08.13	q
18	2	Alberto Salazar	United States	28:10.10	q
19	2	Steve Binns	Great Britain & N.I.	28:12.79	
20	2	Peter Butler	Canada	28:13.16	
21	2	Zakariah Barie	Tanzania	28:22.06	
22	1	Rodolfo Gómez	Mexico	28:25.38	
23	1	John Treacy	Ireland	28:35.58	
24	2	Ahmed Musa Jouda	Sudan	28:38.03	
25	1	Roy Andersen	Norway	29:03.45	
26	1	Boualem Rahoui	Algeria	29:10.95	
27	1	Domingo Tibaduiza	Colombia	29:23.86	
28	2	Kunimitsu Ito	Japan	29:49.04	
29	2	Ronald Lanzoni	Costa Rica	30:18.60	
30	1	Antoine Nivyobizi	Burundi	30:45.10	
31	1	Ramón López	Paraguay	31:27.01	
32	1	Said Toumane	Comoros	34:24.62	
	1	Markus Ryffel	Switzerland	DNF	
	2	Stanislav Rozman	Yugoslavia	DNF	
	1	Mehmet Yurdadon	Turkey	DNS	
	2	Girma Berhanu	Ethiopia	DNS	
	2	Dietmar Millonig	Austria	DNS	

=== Final ===
The final took place on August 9.

Rank	Name	Nationality	Time
1st place, gold medalist(s)	Alberto Cova	Italy	28:01.04
2nd place, silver medalist(s)	Werner Schildhauer	East Germany	28:01.18
3rd place, bronze medalist(s)	Hansjörg Kunze	East Germany	28:01.26
4	Martti Vainio	Finland	28:01.37
5	Gidamis Shahanga	Tanzania	28:01.93
6	Carlos Lopes	Portugal	28:06.78
7	Nick Rose	Great Britain & N.I.	28:07.53
8	Christoph Herle	West Germany	28:09.05
9	Mohamed Kedir	Ethiopia	28:09.92
10	Bekele Debele	Ethiopia	28:11.13
11	Antonio Prieto	Spain	28:11.57
12	Steve Jones	Great Britain & N.I.	28:15.03
13	Mark Nenow	United States	28:17.28
14	Fernando Mamede	Portugal	28:18.39
15	Bill McChesney	United States	28:34.46
16	José Gómez	Mexico	28:42.61
17	Alberto Salazar	United States	28:48.42
	Henrik Jørgensen	Denmark	DNS
