= Mário Moniz Pereira =

Portuguese teacher, sportsman, athlete, coach and songwriter

- Born: Mário Alberto Freire Moniz Pereira; February 11, 1921; Lisbon
- Died: July 31, 2016 (aged 95); Lisbon
- Occupations: Athlete, Coach, Manager
- Known for: Sporting Clube de Portugal, Athletics

Mário Moniz Pereira (February 11, 1921 – July 31, 2016) was a teacher, sportsman, athlete, coach, songwriter and sports director. A noted athletics coach for both Sporting Clube de Portugal's (Sporting CP) athletics department and the Portuguese Athletics Federation where he worked as a technical director, he was also a vice president of Sporting CP. He was the coach of Olympic medalist Carlos Lopes, among other noted athletes. Established by Sporting Portugal, the international athletics meeting Meeting de Atletismo Professor Moniz Pereira is named in his honor.

== Biography ==
Moniz Pereira was born and raised in Lisbon. He lived with his family in Rua Gomes Freire (street) where future prime minister and president of Portugal Mário Soares, about three years his junior, was his neighbour, and organized since an early age street athletics events with friends. Moniz Pereira's maternal grandfather was the owner of Central Cinema in Avenida da Liberdade where he used to spend some of his time watching movies including musicals. He studied at Liceu Camões high school and afterwards tried to enroll in the military academy together with his brother, but contrary to his brother he failed to get admission into the military academy due to his lack of proficiency in algebra. He then embraced the INEF (Instituto Nacional de Educação Física, which would later become the Faculdade de Motricidade Humana of the Technical University of Lisbon) as a student in order to have an education in sports and physical education.

Moniz Pereira became a sports teacher in the same place he had studied, working there for 27 years. Always a sportsman, he practiced handball, basketball, football, roller hockey, table tennis, volleyball and athletics for sports club Sporting Clube de Portugal (Sporting CP), becoming a player of the Portugal men's national volleyball team as well, and later excelled in a long and fruitful career as an athletics coach for Sporting CP's athletics department. Moniz Pereira would become technical director of the Portuguese Athletics Federation and vice president of the entire sports club as well. In 1950, he had a brief spell as an athletics coach for the athletics section of the Associação Académica de Coimbra, in Coimbra. After that he returned to Sporting CP's athletics department in Lisbon and, starting in 1967, became the only coach for Carlos Lopes who would win three World Cross Country Championships as well as the first Olympic gold medal ever for Portugal, competing in the marathon at the 1984 Summer Olympics in Los Angeles. In the 1976 Summer Olympics, Carlos Lopes had already won the first Olympic silver medal in the history of Portuguese sports, competing in the men's 10,000 metres. Fernando Mamede, Domingos Castro, Dionísio Castro, Álvaro Dias, Manuel de Oliveira, José Carvalho and Hélder de Jesus, were also some other Sporting CP's athletes coached by Moniz Pereira.

Throughout his life, as a poet and songwriter, he was the author and composer of fados sung by famous Portuguese fadistas (fado singers) and other singers, like Amália Rodrigues, Lucília do Carmo, João Braga, Maria da Fé, Rodrigo, Carlos do Carmo, Tony de Matos, Fernando Tordo, Paulo de Carvalho and Camané, with songs like Valeu a Pena, Fado Varina, Rosa da Madragoa, Rosa da Noite, Não me Conformo, Leio em teus Olhos, among many others. He has 114 themes registered with the Portuguese Society of Authors (SPA).

== Sports-related milestones' timeline and honors ==
Mário Moniz Pereira achieved notability in the world of sports across the years, this include:

=== Milestones ===
- 1939 – Joined Sporting CP as a table tennis player.
- 1945 – Coached Sporting CP's athletics team and taught gymnastics and then volleyball.
- 1948 – Participated in the first 1948 Summer Olympics in London.
- 1956 – International Referee at the 1956 FIVB Volleyball Men's World Championship in Paris.
- 1976 to 1983 – Director of the National Stadium.
- 1982 – President of the Portuguese High Competition Support Commission (Comissão de Apoio à Alta Competição).
- 1995 – vice president of Sporting CP appointed by Pedro Santana Lopes.

=== Honors ===
- 1974 and 1984 – Honoured with the Sports Merit Medal.
- 1980 – Honoured with the Order of Infante D. Henrique.
- 1984 – Honoured with the Commendation of the Order of Public Instruction.
- 1985 – Awarded the Gold Medal of Merit; Appointed Counsellor of the Technical University of Lisbon.
- 1988 – Awarded the Olympic Order.
- 1991 – Honoured with the rank of Grand Officer of the Order of Prince Henry the Navigator.
- 2000 – Honoured by Sporting CP with the 'Golden Lion with Palm', the sports club's highest award.
- 2001 – Received the Golden Emblem from the European Athletics Association - the highest individual honour in the sport.
- 2009 – Honoured with the Sports Merit - High Prestige award from the Portuguese Sports Confederation.
- 2013 – Golden Globe in the Merit and Excellence category.

== Personal life ==
Moniz Pereira married Maria Carlota Moniz Pereira, a colleague from INEF, with whom he had five children. She died in 2013.
