= Tolossa Kotu =

Ethiopian long-distance runner and coach

Tolossa Kotu Terfe (born 25 December 1952 (Note: Tilastopaja gives his birth date as 15 March 1950.) also transliterated as Tolosa Kotu) is an Ethiopian long-distance runner and coach. He placed fourth in men's 10,000 metres at the 1980 Summer Olympics and has coached the national teams of both Ethiopia and Bahrain.

== Running career ==
Tolossa Kotu represented Ethiopia at the 1972 Summer Olympics in Munich in the 5000 metres, but failed to qualify for the final. At the 1980 Olympics in Moscow Kotu ran the 10,000 metres, winning his heat. In the final he stayed with the leaders until the last lap, placing fourth behind Miruts Yifter, Kaarlo Maaninka and Mohammed Kedir. Track & Field News ranked him the seventh-best 10,000 m runner of 1980, behind the three runners he lost to at the Olympics and three whose countries boycotted the Olympics (Craig Virgin, Henry Rono and Toshihiko Seko); this was the only time he was ranked in the world's top 10. In 1981 he represented Africa at 5,000 metres in the 1981 IAAF World Cup in Rome, placing fifth.

== Coaching career ==
Kotu remained active in distance running as a coach. Kenenisa Bekele joined Kotu's Mugher Cement Factory team as a 16-year-old in 1998, and Kotu coached him to multiple Olympic and world titles. Kotu also coached Ethiopian national teams before moving to Bahrain to coach that country's team.
