= Mark Nenow =

American long-distance runner

Personal information
- Nationality: American
- Born: November 16, 1957 (age 68) Minneapolis, Minnesota

Sport
- Sport: Track, long-distance running
- Event(s): 5000 meters, 10,000 meters, marathon
- College team: Kentucky

Achievements and titles
- Personal best(s): 3000 meters: 7:43.01; 5000 meters: 13:18.54; 10,000 meters: 27:20.56 Marathon: 2:14:21

Mark Nenow (born November 16, 1957) is a retired long-distance runner from the United States. He ran an American record in the 10,000 meters, with a result of 27 minutes, 20.56 seconds in Brussels, Belgium on September 5, 1986; it stood as a national record until May 4, 2001.

== Running career ==
Nenow attended Anoka High School in Minnesota. Although he did not take up running until his upper-class years in high school, he graduated from Anoka with personal-best times of 4:22 in the mile and 9:17 in the 2-mile. He subsequently attended and ran with University of Kentucky, with whom he competed in cross country and track and field. He spent much of his time in Kentucky following a high-mileage protocol, often running 140 miles per week. As a senior undergrad at Kentucky he qualified for the Olympic Trials in 1980 (even though the US ended up boycotting the 1980 Summer Olympics). He ran professionally for Nike, Puma, and ASICS.

== Achievements ==
Year	Competition	Venue	Position	Event	Notes
Representing the United States
1981	World Cross Country Championships	Madrid, Spain	2nd	Team	
1983	Pan American Games	Caracas, Venezuela	3rd	10,000 m	
1983	World Championships	Helsinki, Finland	13th	10,000 m	
