= 1978 European Athletics Championships – Men's 10,000 metres =

Men's 10,000 metres at the European Athletics Championships

The men's 10,000 metres at the 1978 European Athletics Championships was held in Prague, then Czechoslovakia, at Stadion Evžena Rošického on 29 August 1978.

== Medalists ==
Gold	Martti Vainio; Finland
Silver	Venanzio Ortis; Italy
Bronze	Aleksandras Antipovas; Soviet Union

== Results ==
=== Final ===
This 10,000-metre race was characterized by a fairly quick and steady pace, and by the rather frequent changes of the main group's leader. Romania's Paul Copu led the field through 1,000 metres in 2:43.8, and through 2,000 metres in 5:26.2. Under 100 metres later, he let his teammate Ilie Floroiu pass him. Copu deliberately dropped to the last place, and he retired from the race at 2,400 metres. Over 300 metres later, Britain's Brendan Foster took the lead for the first time. During the next several laps, Foster and Floroiu sometimes alternated in the lead. The pace slowed down slightly, with 3,000 metres being clocked in 8:12.0, and with 4,000 metres taking the leader 10:58.3. By the time the main group's leader passed 5,000 metres in 13:44.8, ten runners had lost contact with the leading group, but thirteen runners still were able to endure the steady and quite fast pace. Before 6,000 metres, the Soviet Union's Alexander Antipov moved to the lead, and he passed that split point in 16:32.7. At that point, eleven runners still remained in the main group. After 6,900 metres, Jos Hermens of the Netherlands was forced to drop out of the race, due to a serious leg injury. Around 7,000 metres, at which point the official split time was 19:20.6, the Soviet Union's Enn Sellik began to have trouble following the leading group, due to a stinging pain in his liver. However, he never fully lost contact with the leaders, and during the eighth kilometre, he overcame his physical discomfort. Floroiu still led the main group through 8,000 metres in 22:08.8. About one lap later, Britain's David Black moved into the lead. Around 8,500 metres, Poland's Jerzy Kowol at last was forced to drop from the leading group. After 8,800 metres, Sellik and Norway's Knut Kvalheim also lost touch with the main group, and a moment later they were joined by the Netherlands' Gerard Tebroke, who could not keep up with Black's sudden and sharp surge of pace. At 9,000 metres, Black led the field in 24:54.4, with Foster closely following him. Several metres behind were running Floroiu, Ortis, Antipov, and Vainio. On the far bend, Vainio rose to the third place, and was able to catch Black and Foster. The leading trio of runners caught East Germany's Waldemar Cierpinski by one lap. Around 9,300 metres, the exhausted Floroiu fell behind the main group, while Ortis and Antipov joined the three leading runners early on the back straight. Shortly before the final lap started, Foster passed Black. On the last lap's front bend, Ortis passed Antipov, and a moment later, Vainio accelerated past Black. With slightly over 300 metres left, Ortis surprisingly surged into the lead. Black lost contact with the leading group early on the final back straight, but Foster kicked past Ortis into the lead. At the start of the final bend, Vainio accelerated past Ortis, and with under 130 metres left, he easily passed Foster. By the start of the homestretch, also Ortis kicked past the exhausted Foster. Antipov, who had dropped several metres behind the top three runners on the final bend, kicked furiously on the homestretch, and he caught Foster with around 30 metres to go. Amazingly, the tired British runner soon gave up the struggle for the bronze medal, and he jogged across the finish line in the fourth place. By contrast, Antipov almost passed Ortis, who could only secure the silver medal by leaning across the finish line. Vainio set a new European Championships and Finnish record at 27:31.0 - nearly 30 seconds faster than he had ever run 10,000 metres before. (See for example The Runner Magazine / Juoksija-lehti, Prague European Championships / EM-Praha (Helsinki, Finland, 1978); Wolfgang Wunsche, The Heroes of the Race Tracks / Kilpakenttien sankarit (translated into Finnish; Helsinki, 1984); the Finnish TV commentary on this race in the following two videos: https://www.youtube.com/watch?v=3DGEBCa1jrU; https://www.youtube.com/watch?v=-dKINSTK0So).

Rank	Name	Nationality	Time	Notes
1st place, gold medalist(s)	Martti Vainio	Finland	27:30.99	NR CR
2nd place, silver medalist(s)	Venanzio Ortis	Italy	27:31.48	NR
3rd place, bronze medalist(s)	Aleksandras Antipovas	Soviet Union	27:31.50	URSS/Lithuania NR
4	Brendan Foster	Great Britain	27:32.65	
5	Dave Black	Great Britain	27:36.27	PB
6	Gerard Tebroke	Netherlands	27:36.64	NR
7	Ilie Floroiu	Romania	27:40.06	NR
8	Enn Sellik	Soviet Union	27:40.61	PB Estonia NR
9	Knut Kvalheim	Norway	27:41.26	NR
10	Jerzy Kowol	Poland	27:53.61	NR
11	John Treacy	Ireland	28:17.0	
12	Léon Schots	Belgium	28:19.6	
13	Cătălin Andreica	Romania	28:29.4	
14	Mike McLeod	Great Britain	28:38.0	
15	Øyvind Dahl	Norway	28:43.2	
16	Frank Grillaert	Belgium	28:43.5	
17	Ryszard Kopijasz	Poland	28:44.2	
18	Karel Lismont	Belgium	28:49.2	
19	Waldemar Cierpinski	East Germany	28:58.9	
20	Karel Gába	Czechoslovakia	29:56.3	
	Pierre Levisse	France	DNF	
	Detlef Uhlemann	West Germany	DNF	
	Jos Hermens	Netherlands	DNF	
	Paul Copu	Romania	DNF	

== Participation ==
According to an unofficial count, 24 athletes from 14 countries participated in the event.

- Belgium (3)
- Czechoslovakia (1)
- East Germany (1)
- Finland (1)
- France (1)
- Ireland (1)
- Italy (1)
- Netherlands (2)
- Norway (2)
- Poland (2)
- Romania (3)
- Soviet Union (2)
- Great Britain (3)
- West Germany (1)
