= Zakariah Barie =

Tanzanian long-distance runner (born 1953)

Zakariah Barie (born 29 May 1953) is a retired Tanzanian long-distance runner who specialized in the 10,000 metres.

He won the silver medal at the 1982 Commonwealth Games, finished thirteenth at the 1984 Olympic Games. He also competed at the 1980 Olympic Games and the 1983 World Championships without reaching the final.

He studied at the University of Texas at El Paso.
