= Bill McChesney (athlete) =

American long-distance runner

Bill McChesney, Jr
Personal information
- Nationality: American
- Born: January 8, 1959 Eugene, Oregon, U.S.
- Died: October 29, 1992 (aged 33) Toledo, Oregon, U.S.

Sport
- Country: United States
- Sport: Track
- Event: Distance
- College team: Oregon
- Club: Santa Monica Track Club

Achievements and titles
- Personal bests: Mile: 3:56.36; 3000 meters: 7:40.19; 5000 meters: 13:14.80; 10,000 meters: 27:47.25

Bill McChesney Jr. (January 8, 1959 – October 29, 1992) was an American long-distance runner from Eugene, Oregon. He is Oregon's former record holder in the 5,000 meters.

== Running career ==
He graduated from South Eugene High School and earned All-American honors in cross-country and track and field while attending the University of Oregon. He qualified for the 1980 U.S. Olympic team in the 5,000 meters but was unable to compete due to the 1980 Summer Olympics boycott. He did however receive one of 461 Congressional Gold Medals created especially for the spurned athletes. McChesney was ranked first in America and fourth in the world in the 5,000-meters during the 1981 season.

== Death ==
McChesney died in a car accident in 1992 outside of Toledo, Oregon. He was 33.
