= Bill Scott (runner) =

Australian long-distance runner

Personal information
- Full name: William Scott
- Nationality: Australian
- Born: 8 February 1952 (age 73)

Sport
- Sport: Long-distance running
- Event: 10,000 metres

William Scott (born 8 February 1952) is an Australian long-distance runner. He competed in the men's 10,000 metres at the 1980 Summer Olympics.
