= Dias Alface =

Mozambican long-distance runner

Personal information
- Nationality: Mozambican

Sport
- Sport: Long-distance running
- Event: 10,000 metres

Dias Alface is a Mozambican long-distance runner. He competed in the men's 10,000 metres at the 1980 Summer Olympics.
