= Jean-Paul Gomez =

French long-distance runner

Personal information
- Nationality: French
- Born: 8 May 1945 (age 81) Ligugé, France

Sport
- Sport: Long-distance running
- Event: 10,000 metres

Jean-Paul Gomez (born 8 May 1945) is a French long-distance runner. He competed in the men's 10,000 metres at the 1976 Summer Olympics.
