= Carlos Lopes =

Portuguese long-distance runner (born 1947)

Carlos Lopes CGIH
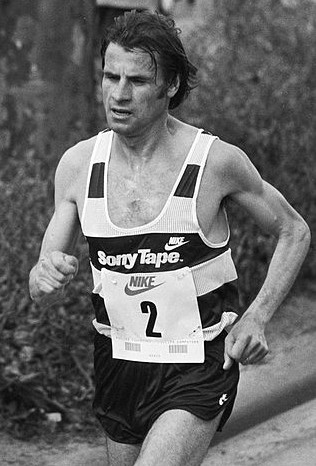
- Lopes at the 1985 Rotterdam Marathon

Personal information
- Full name: Carlos Alberto de Sousa Lopes
- Nationality: Portugal
- Born: 18 February 1947 (age 79) Vildemoinhos, Viseu, Portugal

Sport
- Sport: Athletics/Track, Long-distance running
- Events: 5000 metres, 10,000 metres, Marathon, Cross country
- Club: Sporting Clube de Portugal

Achievements and titles
- Personal bests: 5000 m: 13:16.38; 10,000 m: 27:17.48; Marathon: 2:07:12
Medal record
Olympic Games
Gold medal – first place	1984 Los Angeles	Marathon
Silver medal – second place	1976 Montreal	10,000 m
World Cross Country Championships
Gold medal – first place	1976 Chepstow	Senior race
Gold medal – first place	1984 East Rutherford	Senior race
Gold medal – first place	1985 Lisbon	Senior race
Silver medal – second place	1977 Düsseldorf	Senior race
Silver medal – second place	1983 Gateshead	Senior race

Carlos Alberto de Sousa Lopes CGIH (Portuguese pronunciation: [ˈkaɾluʒ ˈlɔpɨʃ], born 18 February 1947) is a Portuguese former long-distance runner and world-record holder in the marathon. He won the marathon at the 1984 Summer Olympics in Los Angeles, becoming Portugal's first Olympic gold medalist, the oldest ever Olympic marathon winner at the age of 37, and setting an Olympic record for the event which stood for 24 years. On 20 April 1985, Lopes set the men's marathon world record at 2:07:12 at the Rotterdam Marathon. At club level, he competed for Sporting CP.

Regarded as one of the greatest Portuguese athletes of all-time, Lopes is the last European to hold the men's marathon world-record, between 1985 and 1988. He won two Olympic medals, three World Cross Country Championships (1976, 1984, 1985), two national 10,000 metres championships (1970, 1978), two national 5000 metres championships (1968, 1983) and one national 3000 metres steeplechase championship (1975).

== Early life ==
Carlos Lopes was born on 18 February 1947 in Vildemoinhos, near Viseu, Portugal. He was the first child in a family with eight children. To help with the family's financial struggles, he started working at age 13, taking several jobs such as stonemason's assistant and metalworker.

Lopes wanted to play football at local club Lusitano, but his father opposed it, so he turned to other sports. In 1967, he was invited to join the athletics team of Sporting Clube de Portugal, where his coach was Mário Moniz Pereira, and remained there until the end of his career in 1985.

== Career ==
Lopes won the World Cross Country Championships in Chepstow, Wales in 1976.

At the 1976 Summer Olympics in Montreal, Lopes competed in the 10,000 metres. In the race, Lopes set the pace from the 4000 metres mark, and the only athlete to follow him was defending double Olympic champion Lasse Virén. Virén passed Lopes with a lap to go to win the gold medal, and Lopes finished a comfortable second.

During the race, Lopes ran the first 5,000 metres in 14:08.94, and the second 5,000 metres in 13:36.23, a remarkable proof of his ability to steadily accelerate his pace. What he generally lacked in the track races, however, was an ability to sharply increase his pace in the final lap or so.

In the following year, Lopes finished second to Leon Schots in World Cross Country Championships in Düsseldorf, Germany.

Afterward, Lopes had several injuries and did not qualify for 1980 Summer Olympics in Moscow.

In 1982, Lopes returned to top form, and in Oslo, Norway, he broke the 10,000 metres European record with a time of 27:24.39, which belonged to his teammate Fernando Mamede.

At the 1982 European Athletics Championships in Athens, Greece, Lopes finished fourth in the 10,000 metres with a time of 27:47.95, behind the winner Alberto Cova. During the race, he set the pace from 6,000 metres to 9,800 metres before being overtaken on the final lap.

Lopes attempted his first marathon at the 1982 New York City Marathon, but he did not finish due to an accident in which he ran into a spectator.

In 1983, he finished second at the World Cross Country Championships in Gateshead, England.

Lopes ran his second marathon at the Rotterdam Marathon in 1983. He finished second in a European record time of 2:08:39, two seconds behind the race winner, Robert de Castella. He then decided to run the 10,000 metres at the 1983 World Championships in Helsinki, Finland, where he finished sixth behind the winner Alberto Cova. After that he decided to concentrate on the marathon and cross country.

In 1984, Lopes won his second World Cross Country Championships in East Rutherford, United States. In Stockholm, Sweden, he paced teammate Fernando Mamede to break Henry Rono's 10,000 metres world record of 27:22.50. Mamede won in 27:13.81 with Lopes finishing second in 27:17.48.

=== Olympic champion ===
An accident almost prevented Lopes from participating in the 1984 Summer Olympics in Los Angeles when, a week before the Games, he was run over by a car in Lisbon but he was not hurt.

The Olympic marathon at Los Angeles was run in very warm conditions, and as the favorites gradually fell away, Lopes won the gold medal with a 200 metres advantage and in an Olympic record time of 2:09:21 at the age of 37. This victory established his reputation as a world class runner, because he ran the last 7.2 kilometres (4.5 mi) at an average speed of 2:55 per km (4:42 per mile), a remarkably quick pace at the end of a marathon. Lopes' Olympic record stood until the 2008 Summer Olympics in Beijing, China, when Kenyan Sammy Wanjiru won with a time of 2:06:32.

In 1985, Lopes won the World Cross Country Championships in Lisbon, Portugal for the third and final time in his career.

=== Marathon world record ===
In the last major competitive race of his career, the 1985 Rotterdam Marathon, Lopes took 53 seconds off the world's best marathon time with a winning time of 2:07.12, and becoming the first man to run 42.195 km in less than 2:08.00.

== Honours ==
- Knight of the Order of Prince Henry (23 December 1977)
- Officer of the Order of Prince Henry (4 July 1984)
- Grand Officer of the Order of Prince Henry (26 October 1984)
- Grand Cross of the Order of Prince Henry (24 August 1985)

== Popular culture ==
Lopes appears in the 14th episode of season 12 of The Simpsons, where Homer learns in a documentary that Lopes is the oldest ever winner of the Olympic marathon, at 38, and inspires Homer, who claims to be almost his age, to enter the Springfield Marathon. Lopes was actually 37 when he won the 1984 Olympic marathon.

Records
Preceded by (United Kingdom) Steve Jones	Men's Marathon World Record Holder; 20 April 1985 – 17 April 1988	Succeeded by (Ethiopia) Belayneh Dinsamo
Preceded by (East Germany) Waldemar Cierpinski	Men's Marathon Olympic Record Holder; 12 August 1984 – 24 August 2008	Succeeded by (Kenya) Samuel Wanjiru
Awards and achievements
Preceded by Maria Manuela Contreiras	Olympic Medal Nobre Guedes; 1973	Succeeded by Armando Marques; Hugo d'Assumpção
Sporting positions
Preceded by Steve Jones	Men's Fastest Marathon Race; 1985	Succeeded by Robert de Castella
