= Alberto Cova =

Italian long-distance runner

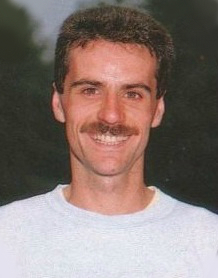
- Cova in 1987

Personal information
- Nationality: Italian
- Born: 1 December 1958 (age 67) Inverigo, Italy
- Height: 1.76 m (5 ft 9 in)
- Weight: 58 kg (128 lb)

Sport
- Country: Italy
- Sport: Athletics
- Event: Long distance running
- Club: Pro Patria Milano
- Coached by: Giorgio Rondelli

Achievements and titles
- Personal bests: 5000 m: 13:10.06 (1985); 10,000 m: 27:37.59 (1983)
Medal record
Men's athletics
Representing Italy
Event	1st	2nd	3rd
Olympic Games	1	0	0
World Championships	1	0	0
European Championships	1	1	0
European Indoor Championships	0	1	0
Mediterranean Games	1	0	0
European Cup	2	1	1
Total	6	3	1
Olympic Games
Gold medal – first place	1984 Los Angeles	10,000 m
World Championships
Gold medal – first place	1983 Helsinki	10,000 m
European Championships
Gold medal – first place	1982 Athens	10,000 m
Silver medal – second place	1986 Stuttgart	10,000 m
European Indoor Championships
Silver medal – second place	1982 Milan	3000 m
Mediterranean Games
Gold medal – first place	1983 Casablanca	5000 m

Alberto Cova (born 1 December 1958) is a retired Italian long-distance track athlete, winner of the 10,000 m at the 1984 Summer Olympics and 1983 World Championships.

== Biography ==
Born in Inverigo, province of Como, Italy, Alberto Cova was characterized by his superiority in the sprint finish, and the only way to nullify this was to set a very fast pace from the start to finish. Cova got his first fame at the 1982 European Championships in Athens, where he surprisingly outsprinted the main favourite Werner Schildhauer from East Germany, to win his first international championship title. In the next year, Cova wasn't the main favourite at the first World Championships held in Helsinki, being considered only as a possible medal winner. The 10,000 m final at Helsinki was run in slow pace, with thirteen runners still in a leading pack at the bell. With only 30 metres to go, Cova was only in fifth place, but then sprinted forward to win. Schildhauer finished in second place. The top four runners sprinted to the finish line in 0.33 seconds.

The 10,000 m final at the Los Angeles Olympics began at an even slower pace than at Helsinki. At the 6 km mark, Martti Vainio from Finland, picked up the speed. Cova managed to follow him, and Vainio couldn't sustain his own pace, so Cova swept past him after the bell and sprinted to the line to win his last international title.

At the 1986 European Championships in Stuttgart, Cova was beaten at his own game, when he was outsprinted by fellow countryman Stefano Mei on the last lap of the 10,000 m final. Cova never won a major race after that, and came tenth in his heat (thereby failing to qualify for the final) at the 1988 Summer Olympics in Seoul. This was his last international competition.

In the 1983 World Athletics Championships 10,000-metre final, there actually were seven men in the lead group at the bell. In the 1984 Olympics 10,000-metre final, Finland's Martti Vainio picked up the speed shortly before the 6 kilometre mark

== Achievements ==
Year	Competition	Venue	Position	Event	Time	Notes
1981	European Cup (Super League)	(Socialist Federal Republic of Yugoslavia) Zagreb	6th	5000 m	13:45.48	
1982	European Indoor Championships	(Italy) Milan	2nd	3000 m	7:54.12	
1982	European Championships	(Greece) Athens	DSQ	5000 m	No time	(Note: He ran in 13:27.65 in heats.)
1982	European Championships	(Greece) Athens	1st	10,000 m	27:41.03	
1983	World Championships	(Finland) Helsinki	1st	10,000 m	28:01.04	(Note: He ran a better crono, 27:46.61, in heats.)
1983	European Cup (Super League)	(United Kingdom) London	3rd	5000 m	13:55.59	
1983	European Cup (Super League)	(United Kingdom) London	2nd	10,000 m	28:02.13	
1984	Olympic Games	(United States) Los Angeles	1st	10,000 m	27:47.54	
1985	European Cup (Super League)	(Soviet Union) Moscow	1st	5000 m	14:05.45	
1985	European Cup (Super League)	(Soviet Union) Moscow	1st	10,000 m	28:51.46	
1986	European Championships	(Germany) Stuttgart	8th	5000 m	13:35,86	(Note: He ran a better crono, 13:31,18, in heats.)
1986	European Championships	(Germany) Stuttgart	2nd	10,000 m	27:57.93	(Note: In that edition of the European Championships Italy conquered all three steps of the podium, with Stefano Mei 1st and Salvatore Antibo 3rd.)
1988	Olympic Games	(South Korea) Seoul	Heat	10,000 m	28:43.84	

== National titles ==
He won fourteen national championships at senior level.

- Italian Athletics Championships
  - 5000 m: 1980, 1982, 1983, 1985 (4)
  - 10,000 m: 1981, 1982 (2)
- Italian Athletics Indoor Championships
  - 3000 m: 1982, 1983, 1984 (3)
- Italian Cross Country Championships
  - Long race: 1982, 1983, 1984, 1985, 1986 (5)

== See also ==
- FIDAL Hall of Fame
- Italy national athletics team - Multiple medalist
- Italian all-time lists - 5000 metres
- Italian all-time lists - 10000 metres

== Notes ==
Sporting positions
Preceded by Paul Cummings	Men's Half Marathon Best Year Performance; 1984	Succeeded by Mark Curp
