= Aleksandras Antipovas =

Lithuanian long-distance runner (born 1955)

Medal record

Men's athletics

Representing Soviet Union

European Championships
Bronze medal – third place	1978 Prague	10,000 m

Aleksandras Antipovas (born 9 March 1955 in Bagdonys, Lithuanian SSR, Soviet Union) is a retired Lithuanian long-distance runner who represented the USSR under the name Aleksandr Antipov.

== Achievements ==
Year	Competition	Venue	Position	Notes
Representing Soviet Union
1977	World Cross Country Championships	Düsseldorf, West Germany	3rd	Team
1978	European Championships	Prague, Czechoslovakia	3rd	10,000 m
1978	World Cross Country Championships	Glasgow, Scotland	2nd	Long course
1978	World Cross Country Championships	Glasgow, Scotland	4th	Team
1979	World Cross Country Championships	Limerick, Ireland	3rd	Long course
1979	World Cross Country Championships	Limerick, Ireland	4th	Team
1980	World Cross Country Championships	Paris, France	6th	Long course
1980	World Cross Country Championships	Paris, France	5th	Team
1982	World Cross Country Championships	Rome, Italy	3rd	Team
