= Kaarlo Maaninka =

Finnish former long-distance runner (born 1953)

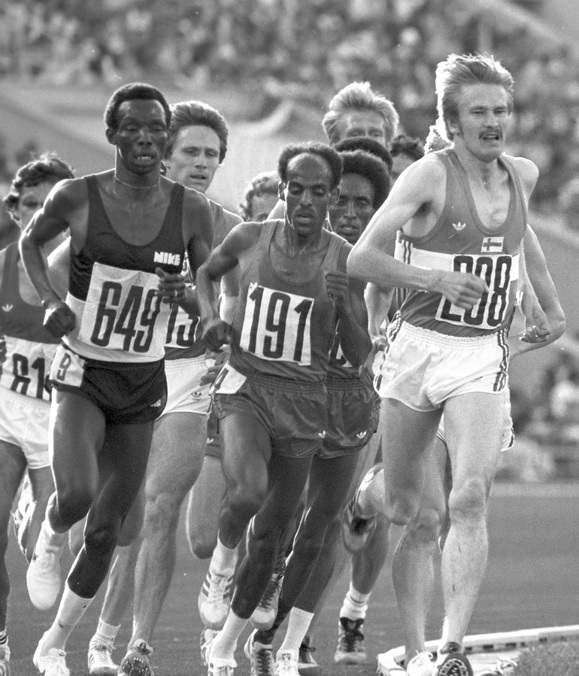
- Olympic Games 1980 - 5000 m: Suleiman Nyambui (649), Miruts Yifter (191), Kaarlo Maaninka (208)

Personal information
- Born: 25 December 1953 (age 72) Posio, Finland
Medal record
Men's Athletics
Representing Finland
Olympic Games
Silver medal – second place	1980 Moscow	10,000 m
Bronze medal – third place	1980 Moscow	5,000 m

Kaarlo Hannes Maaninka (born 25 December 1953) is a Finnish former long-distance runner who won a silver medal in the 10,000 metres and a bronze medal in the 5,000 metres at the 1980 Moscow Olympics. Maanink later admitted to using blood transfusions during the 1980 Olympics, although this practice was not prohibited under the rules at that time.

== Records ==
- 1 500 m: 3.46,80 (1980)
- 3 000 m: 7.58,0 (1978)
- 5 000 m: 13.22,00 (1980)
- 10 000 m: 27.44,28 (1980)
- Marathon: 2.19,28 (1978)
