= Fernando Mamede =

Portuguese long-distance runner (1951–2026)

Medal record

Men's Athletics

Representing Portugal

World Cross Country Championships
Bronze medal – third place	1981 Madrid	Long race

Fernando Eugénio Pacheco Mamede, ComM (1 November 1951 – 27 January 2026) was a Portuguese athlete, a long distance running specialist. He held the 10,000 metres world record until 1989.

== Biography ==
Mamede was born in Beja, started his sports life by playing football locally, then, in 1964, he tried school sport athletics and later he joined Lisbon-based Sporting Clube de Portugal's athletics department where he was an athlete coached by Mário Moniz Pereira from 1968 to 1989. Arrived in Lisbon, he worked some time as an accountant for Sporting Clube de Portugal, and in a bank until 1990, and after that he would work as a municipal sports technician for the Azambuja town hall. He was also a sporting goods store owner in the Avenida de Roma (avenue in Lisbon) for most of his life and after retiring from competition, he worked some time as an assistant athletics coach of Mário Moniz Pereira at Sporting Club de Portugal. Together with Carlos Lopes, he is one of the best Portuguese male long distance runners ever, and held the 10,000 metres world record (1984–1989) with a time of 27:13.81 until bettered by Arturo Barrios of Mexico. He also competed at three Olympic Games. However, he never won any high-level competition as he dealt very badly with pressure – a profile that would become known in Portugal as the Fernando Mamede syndrome (síndrome Fernando Mamede).

In the European and World Athletics Championships as well as in the Olympics, three competitions where he competed between 1971 and 1984, he either was eliminated from the finals, placed outside the top ten runners in them or dropped out of the final. In the 1983 World Championships in Athletics and the 1984 Los Angeles Olympics, he ran excellently in the 10,000-metre qualifying heats, but he placed 14th in the World Championships final and failed to finish in the Olympic final.

He also competed in cross country running, taking part in the IAAF World Cross Country Championships eleven times. His cross country career was highlighted by a bronze medal at the 1981 IAAF World Cross Country Championships and two wins at the Cross Internacional de Itálica.

Mamede died on 27 January 2026, at the age of 74.

Records
Preceded by (Kenya) Henry Rono	Men's 10,000 m World Record Holder; 2 July 1984 – 18 August 1989	Succeeded by (Mexico) Arturo Barrios
Sporting positions
Preceded by (United Kingdom) David Moorcroft	Men's 5000 m Best Year Performance; 1983	Succeeded by (Morocco) Saïd Aouita
