= Ilie Floroiu =

Romanian long-distance runner (born 1952)

Personal information
- Born: 29 November 1952 (age 73) Izvoarele, Tulcea, Romania

Sport
- Sport: Track and field
Medal record
Representing Romania
Summer Universiade
Gold medal – first place	1979 Mexico City	5000m
Gold medal – first place	1979 Mexico City	10,000m
Silver medal – second place	1975 Rome	5000m
Silver medal – second place	1975 Rome	10,000m
Bronze medal – third place	1977 Sofia	10,000m

Ilie Floroiu (born 29 November 1952) is a Romanian former long-distance runner who competed in the 1976 Summer Olympics and in the 1980 Summer Olympics. He was born in Iulia in Izvoarele, Tulcea.
