= Werner Schildhauer =

German distance runner

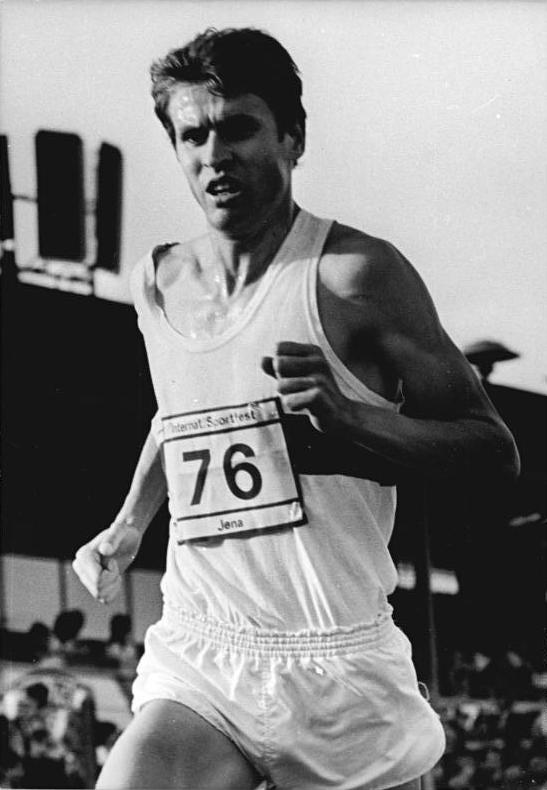

Personal information
- Nationality: East German
- Born: 5 June 1959 (age 67) Dessau, East Germany

Sport
- Country: East Germany
- Sport: Athletics
- Event: Long distance running
Medal record
Men's athletics
Representing East Germany
World Championships
Silver medal – second place	1983 Helsinki	5000 m
Silver medal – second place	1983 Helsinki	10000 m
European Championships
Silver medal – second place	1982 Athens	5000 m
Silver medal – second place	1982 Athens	10,000 m

Werner Schildhauer (born 5 June 1959, in Dessau) is a retired German track and field athlete, who represented the former East Germany at the 1980 Olympic Games in Moscow in the 10,000 meter run and placed 7th behind his teammate Jörg Peter.

== Career ==
At the European Championship in 1982 he won the silver medal in the 5,000 meter run and in the 10,000 meter run. At the World Athletics Championship in 1983 he won the silver medal in both the 5000 meter and 10,000 meter runs. On 28 May 1983 he set an East German record in the 10,000 meters with a time of 27:24.95, a time which had also stood as a German record and was broken almost 14 years later by Dieter Baumann.

Schildhauer represented the Chemie Halle sport club; his long-time rival in East Germany was Hansjörg Kunze.

Schildhauer was known for his effective kick in the final lap or the final 200 metres of the race. In the 1982 European Championships 5,000-metre final, he rose from fourth place to second place on the home straight. In the 1983 World Athletics Championships 5,000-metre final, he rose from fifth place to second place in the last 200 metres; he was still running seventh when the final lap began. In the 1983 World Athletics Championships 10,000-metre final, he sprinted to the lead with about 450 metres or 440 metres to go, and quickly moved to a roughly five-metre lead over his teammate, Hansjörg Kunze. On the final bend, however, Kunze caught him and Italy's Alberto Cova sprinted past him with about five metres to go. Schildhauer lost his chance for one or two Olympic medals when almost all the Soviet bloc countries of Eastern Europe refused to participate in the 1984 Los Angeles Olympics. He still competed in the 1985 World Athletics Cup but lost to Ethiopia's Wodajo Bulti and the United States' Pat Porter in the 10,000-metre race. Leg injuries ended his active running career shortly afterwards.
