= Gerard Tebroke =

Dutch athlete

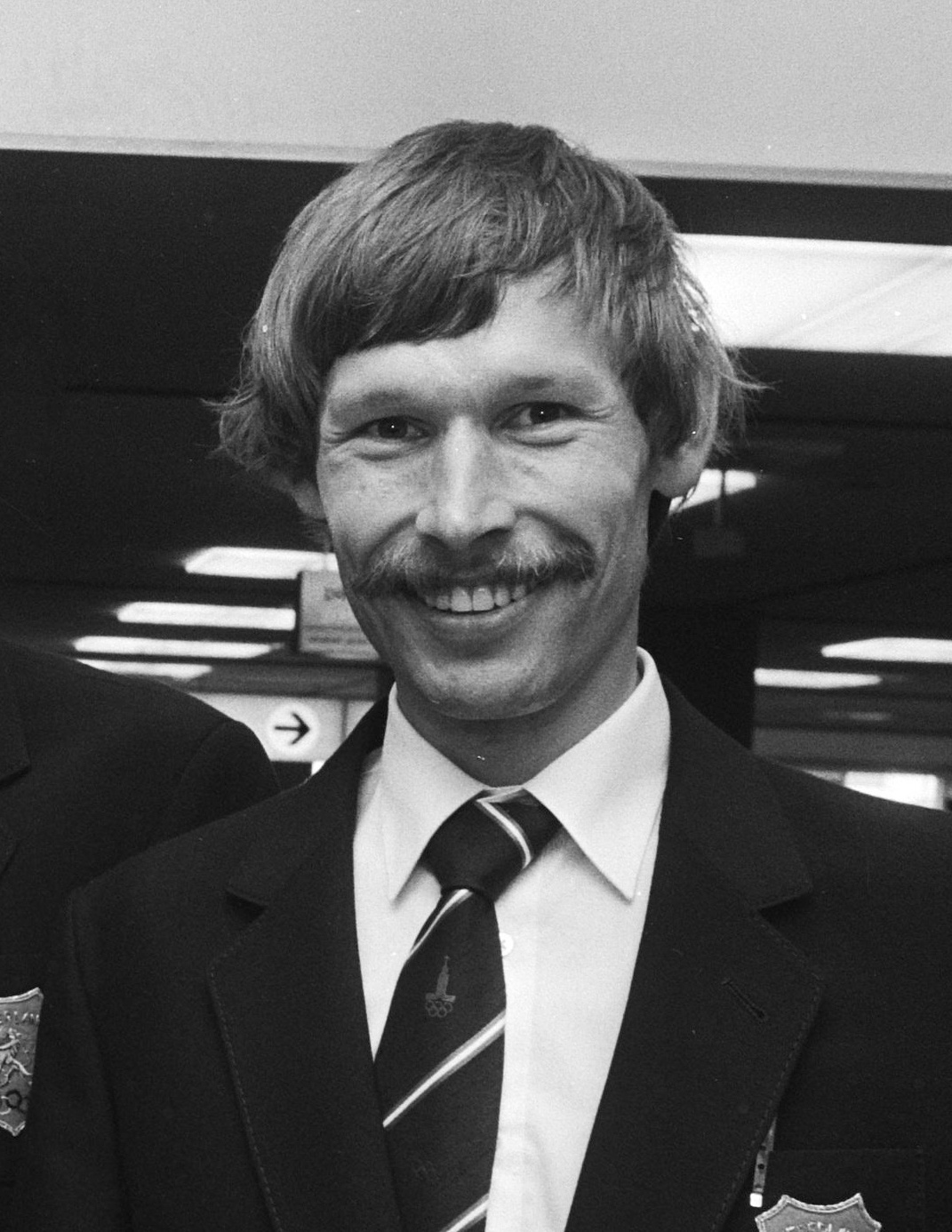
- Gerard Tebroke in 1980

Personal information
- Nationality: Dutch
- Born: 9 November 1949 Enschede, the Netherlands
- Died: 19 March 1995 (aged 45) Doetinchem, the Netherlands
- Height: 1.84 m (6 ft 0 in)
- Weight: 70 kg (150 lb)

Sport
- Sport: Running
- Club: CIKO '66, Arnhem

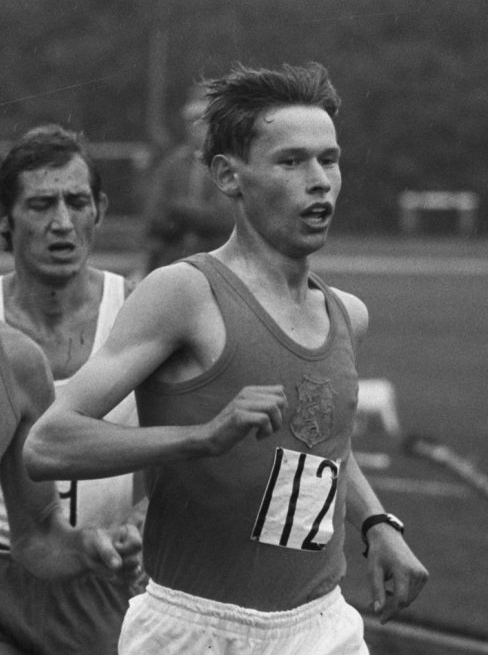
Gerard Tebroke in 1970

Gerardus Franciscus Tebroke (9 November 1949 – 19 March 1995) was a runner from the Netherlands. He competed at the 1980 Summer Olympics in 10,000 m and finished in 14th place.

In 1978, Tebroke set new national records in 5,000 m (13'21.68) and 10,000 m (27'36.64), which stood until 1997 and 2000. He died unexpectedly from an intracranial hemorrhage. Since 1996, a regular (annual or biennial) running competition is carried out in Aalten in his honor.

Tebroke won the British AAA Championships title in the 10,000 metres event at the 1976 AAA Championships.

Awards
Preceded by Ruud Wielart	Herman van Leeuwen Cup; 1978	Succeeded by Harry Schulting
