= Mats Erixon =

Swedish long-distance runner

Personal information
- Full name: Per Mats Stefan Erixon
- Nationality: Swedish
- Born: 19 March 1958 (age 68)

Sport
- Sport: Long-distance running
- Event: 5000 metres

Per Mats Stefan Erixon (born 19 March 1958) is a Swedish long-distance runner. He competed in the men's 5000 metres at the 1984 Summer Olympics.
