= Hansjörg Kunze =

German track and field athlete (born 1959)

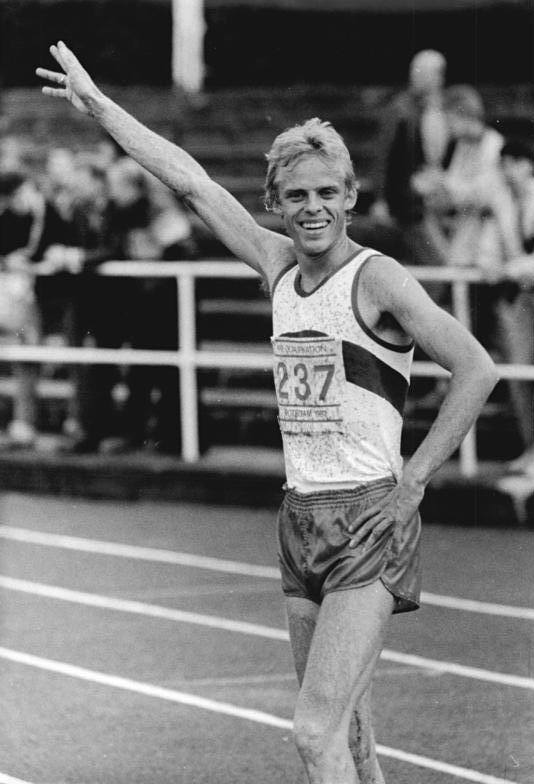
- Kunze in 1987

Medal record

Men's athletics

Representing East Germany

Olympic Games
Bronze medal – third place	1988 Seoul	5000 m

World Championships
Bronze medal – third place	1983 Helsinki	10,000 m
Bronze medal – third place	1987 Rome	10,000 m

Hansjörg Kunze (born 28 December 1959) is a German track and field athlete. He represented East Germany as a long-distance runner.

His biggest success was the bronze medal in the 5000 meter run at the 1988 Summer Olympics in Seoul, South Korea. He represented Empor Rostock sport club.

He had a notable win on 9 September 1981 in Rieti, Italy, when he set a European record in the 5000 meter run with a time of 13:10.40 and beat Kenyan Henry Rono who had dominated that season. With this win he also set himself apart from his longtime rival in East Germany, Werner Schildhauer.

== Further sporting successes ==
- 6th place in the 10,000 metres at the 1988 Olympic Summer Games
- Participant at the 1980 Olympic Summer Games in Moscow (eliminated in the 5000 m semi-final)
- 3rd place at the World Athletics Championships in 1983 and 1987 at 10,000 m
- World Cup, 5000 m: 2nd place 1981, 4th place 1979
- European Cup, 5000 m: 3rd place 1981, 4th place 1983
- Junior European Championship, 3000 m: 3rd place 1977
- East German Championship: 1st place in the 5000 m 1981, 1983, 1984, 1986, 1987, 1st place in the 10,000 m 1984, 1986, 1987, 1988. Together with other victories in other classes he won a total of 15 titles.
- Best time in the 10,000 m: 27:26.0 on 2 July 1988 in Oslo
- In the Youth B age class (under 18 years) he ran times that are still German records (as of 31 December 2004):

2000 m steeplechase: 5:35.11, 18 July 1976 in Erfurt
5000 m: 14:20.2, 8 August 1975, Bansky Bystrica
3000 m: 7:56.4, 27 June 1976, Karl-Marx-Stadt (Chemnitz)

Kunze's bronze medal at 5000 metres in the 1988 Seoul Olympics can be found, for example, in the Finnish "Great Olympic Book" / Suuri Olympiateos, volume 5, published in Finland in 1988. His bronze-medal performances at 10,000 metres in the 1983 and 1987 World Championships can be found, for example, in the Finnish-language books about those World Championships, edited and published by the "Runner" / Juoksija magazine. Also Wolfgang Wünsche's class book about athletics, "The Heroes of Race Tracks," in its 1984 edition (translated into Finnish), includes references to Kunze's bronze medal in the 1983 World Championships, his decision not to run the 5000 metres in those championships, his failure at 5000 metres in the 1982 European Championships (he finished ninth after being pushed around in the crowded group of runners – see, for example, a Finnish book called "Highlights of Top Sports" / Huippu-urheilun tähtihetkiä), and his success at 5000 metres in the 1981 European Athletics Cup. Kunze finished second to Eamonn Coghlan in the very slow World Athletics Cup 5000-metre race in 1981 (see, for example, a Finnish sports book called "Events of Top Sports Until 1982" / Huippu-urheilun tapahtumat vuoteen 1982).

== Further career ==
Since the end of his sport career he has worked as a journalist for a public relations agent for an athletic shoe manufacturer, as commentator for the 1993 World athletic championship in Stuttgart, as a radio and television reporter for a regional station and lastly as a spokesperson for a shipping company. In 2004 he worked for the Rostock Olympic bid committee (for the sailing competition that would be held in Leipzig).

He has been married since 1981 and has two children.
