= 10,000 metres =

Common long-distance running event

Athletics 10,000 metres
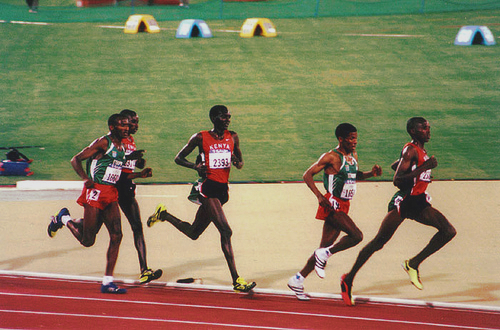
- 10,000 metres at 2000 Summer Olympics, Sydney

World records
- Men: Joshua Cheptegei (UGA) 26:11.00 (2020)
- Women: Beatrice Chebet (KEN) 28:54.14 (2024)

Olympic records
- Men: Joshua Cheptegei (UGA) 26:43.14 (2024)
- Women: Almaz Ayana (ETH) 29:17.45 (2016)

World Championship records
- Men: Kenenisa Bekele (ETH) 26:46.31 (2009)
- Women: Berhane Adere (ETH) 30:04.18 (2003)

World junior (U20) records
- Men: Samuel Wanjiru (KEN) 26:41.75 (2005)
- Women: Linet Masai (KEN) 30:26.50 (2008)

The 10,000 metres or the 10,000-metre run is a common long-distance track running event. The event is part of the athletics programme at the Olympic Games and the World Athletics Championships, and is common at championship-level events. The race consists of 25 laps around an Olympic-sized 400 m track. It is less commonly held at track and field meetings due to its duration. The 10,000-metre track race is usually distinguished from its road running counterpart, the 10K run, by referring to the distance in metres rather than kilometres.

The 10,000 metres is the longest standard track event, approximately equivalent to 6 miles 376 yards or 32,808 feet 5 inches.

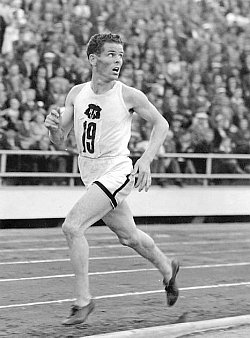
Taisto Mäki from Finland breaks the 30-minute barrier in Helsinki on 17 September 1939.

Added to the Olympic programme in 1912, athletes from Finland, nicknamed the "Flying Finns", dominated the event until the late 1940s. In the 1960s, African runners began to come to the fore. In 1988, the women's competition debuted in the Olympic Games.

Official records are kept for outdoor 10,000-metre track events. The world record for men is held by Joshua Cheptegei of Uganda in 26:11.00, set in Valencia, Spain on 7 October 2020. For women, the world record is held by Beatrice Chebet of Kenya, in 28:54.14, set in Eugene, Oregon, on 25 May 2024.

The 10,000 metres demands exceptional levels of aerobic endurance, and elite athletes typically train in excess of 160 km (100 miles) a week.

== 6 miles ==
10,000 metres is the slightly longer metric derivative of the 6-mile (9,656.1-metre) run, an event common in countries when they were using the imperial measurement system. 6 miles was used in the Commonwealth Games until 1966 and was a championship in the United States in non-Olympic years from 1953 to 1973. It is 24 laps around a 1/4-mile (402 m; 440 yd; 1,320 ft) track.

== Area records ==
- Updated 19 May 2026.

Area	Men			Women		
Area	Time	Season	Athlete	Time	Season	Athlete
World	26:11.00	2020	Joshua Cheptegei (UGA)	28:54.14	2024	Beatrice Chebet (KEN)
Area records
Africa (records)	26:11.00	2020	Joshua Cheptegei (UGA)	28:54.14	2024	Beatrice Chebet (KEN)
Asia (records)	26:38.76	2003	Ahmad Hassan Abdullah (QAT)	29:31.78	1993	Wang Junxia (CHN)
Europe (records)	26:46.57	2011	Mo Farah (GBR)	29:06.82	2021	Sifan Hassan (NED)
North, Central America and Caribbean (records)	26:33.84	2022	Grant Fisher (USA)	30:03.82	2023	Alicia Monson (USA)
Oceania (records)	26:57.07	2026	Ky Robinson (AUS)	30:34.11	2025	Rose Davies (AUS)
South America (records)	27:28.12	2007	Marílson Gomes dos Santos (BRA)	31:33.07	2024	Florencia Borelli (ARG)

== All-time top 25 ==
Tables show data for two definitions of "Top 25" - the top 25 10,000 m times and the top 25 athletes:
- denotes top performance for athletes in the top 25 10,000 m times
- denotes lesser performances, still in the top 25 10,000 m times, by repeat athletes
- denotes top performance (only) for other top 25 athletes who fall outside the top 25 10,000 m times

=== Men ===
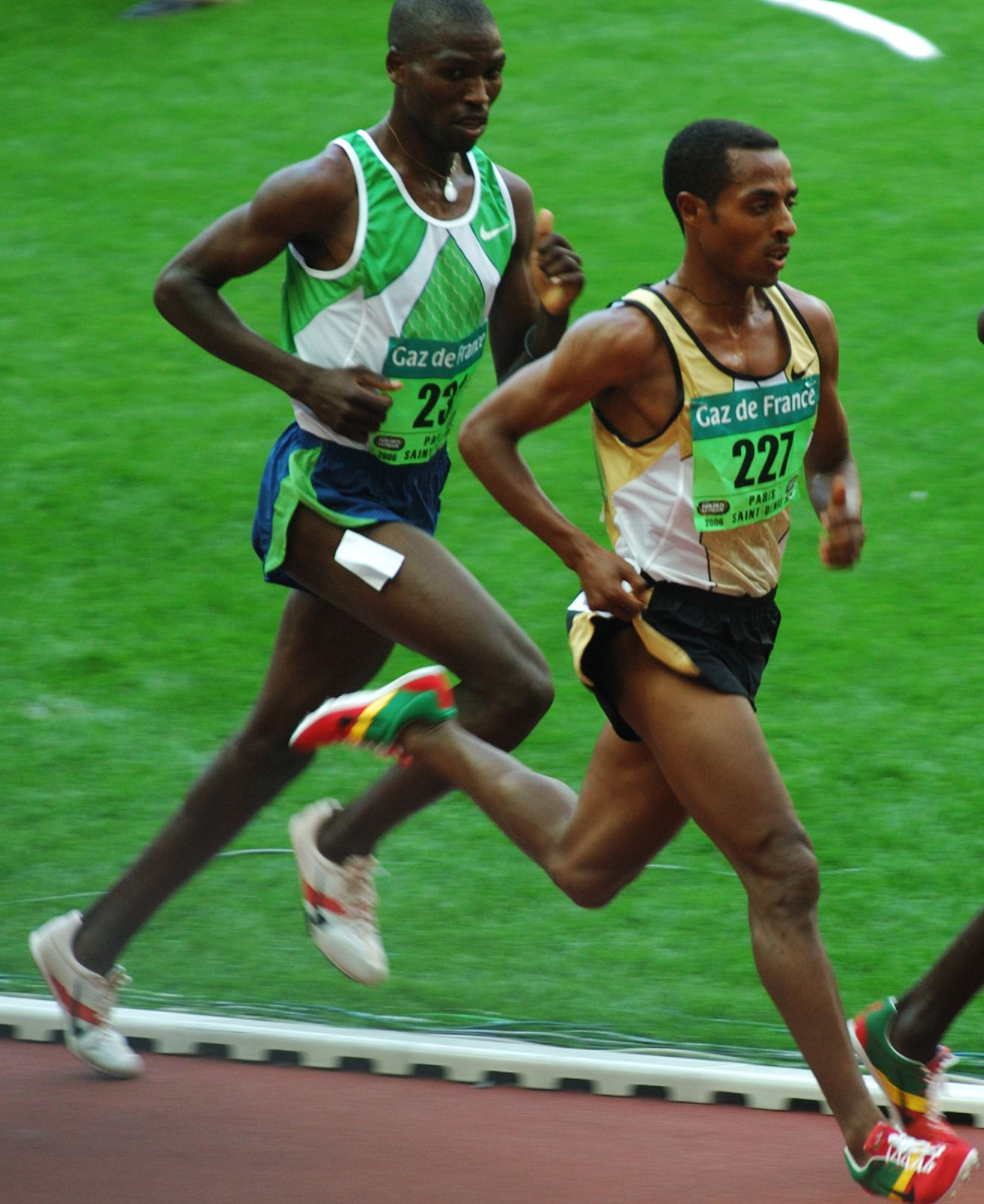
Kenenisa Bekele (right), the former 10,000 m world record holder.

- Correct as of June 2024.

Ath.#	Perf.#	Time	Athlete	Nation	Date	Place	Ref.
1	1	26:11.00	Joshua Cheptegei	Uganda	7 October 2020	Valencia	
2	2	26:17.53	Kenenisa Bekele	Ethiopia	26 August 2005	Brussels	
	3	26:20.31	Bekele #2		8 June 2004	Ostrava	
3	4	26:22.75	Haile Gebrselassie	Ethiopia	1 June 1998	Hengelo	
	5	26:25.97	Bekele #3		8 June 2008	Eugene	
4	6	26:27.85	Paul Tergat	Kenya	22 August 1997	Brussels	
	7	26:28.72	Bekele #4		29 May 2005	Hengelo	
	8	26:29.22	Gebrselassie #2		5 September 2003	Brussels	
5	9	26:30.03	Nicholas Kemboi	Kenya	5 September 2003	Brussels	
6	10	26:30.74	Abebe Dinkesa	Ethiopia	29 May 2005	Hengelo	
7	11	26:31.01	Yomif Kejelcha	Ethiopia	14 June 2024	Nerja	
8	12	26:31.13	Berihu Aregawi	Ethiopia	14 June 2024	Nerja	
	13	26:31.32	Gebrselassie #3		4 July 1997	Oslo	
9	14	26:33.84	Grant Fisher	United States	6 March 2022	San Juan Capistrano	
10	15	26:33.93	Jacob Kiplimo	Uganda	19 May 2021	Ostrava	
11	16	26:34.14	Mohammed Ahmed	Canada	6 March 2022	San Juan Capistrano	
12	17	26:34.93	Selemon Barega	Ethiopia	14 June 2024	Nerja	
13	18	26:35.63	Micah Kogo	Kenya	25 August 2006	Brussels	
14	19	26:36.26	Paul Koech	Kenya	22 August 1997	Brussels	
15	20	26:37.25	Zersenay Tadese	Eritrea	25 August 2006	Brussels	
16	21	26:37.93	Biniam Mehary	Ethiopia	14 June 2024	Nerja	
17	22	26:38.08	Salah Hissou	Morocco	23 August 1996	Brussels	
18	23	26:38.76	Ahmad Abdullah Hassan	Qatar	5 September 2003	Brussels	
19	24	26:39.69	Sileshi Sihine	Ethiopia	31 May 2004	Hengelo	
20	25	26:39.77	Boniface Toroitich Kiprop	Uganda	26 August 2005	Brussels	
21		26:41.75	Samuel Wanjiru	Kenya	26 August 2005	Brussels	
22		26:42.65	Gemechu Dida	Ethiopia	14 June 2024	Nerja	
23		26:43.98	Lucas Rotich	Kenya	7 September 2011	Brussels	
24		26:44.36	Galen Rupp	United States	30 May 2014	Eugene	
25		26:45.91	Tadese Worku	Ethiopia	5 May 2022	Hengelo	

=== Women ===
- Correct as of June 2024.

Ath.#	Perf.#	Time	Athlete	Nation	Date	Place	Ref.
1	1	28:54.14	Beatrice Chebet	Kenya	25 May 2024	Eugene	
2	2	29:01.03	Letesenbet Gidey	Ethiopia	8 June 2021	Hengelo	
3	3	29:05.92	Gudaf Tsegay	Ethiopia	25 May 2024	Eugene	
4	4	29:06.82	Sifan Hassan	Netherlands	6 June 2021	Hengelo	
5	5	29:17.45	Almaz Ayana	Ethiopia	12 August 2016	Rio de Janeiro	
6	6	29:26.89	Lilian Rengeruk	Kenya	25 May 2024	Eugene	
7	7	29:27.59	Margaret Kipkemboi	Kenya	25 May 2024	Eugene	
	8	29:29.73	Tsegay #2		23 June 2023	Nerja	
8	9	29:31.78	Wang Junxia	China	8 September 1993	Beijing	
9	10	29:32.53	Vivian Cheruiyot	Kenya	12 August 2016	Rio de Janeiro	
	11	29:36.67	Hassan #2		10 October 2020	Hengelo	
	12	29:37.80	Hassan #3		3 June 2023	Hengelo	
	13	29:39.42	Tsegay #3		8 May 2021	Maia	
10	14	29:42.56	Tirunesh Dibaba	Ethiopia	12 August 2016	Rio de Janeiro	
11	15	29:47.42	Grace Nawowuna	Kenya	3 June 2023	Hengelo	
12	16	29:47.71	Fotyen Tesfay	Ethiopia	14 June 2024	Nerja	
13	17	29:48.34	Tsigie Gebreselama	Ethiopia	16 March 2024	San Juan Capistrano	
	18	29:49.33	Gebreselama #2		14 June 2024	Nerja	
14	19	29:50.52	Ejgayehu Taye	Ethiopia	14 June 2024	Nerja	
15	20	29:50.77	Kalkidan Gezahegne	Bahrain	8 May 2021	Maia	
16	21	29:53.51	Alice Aprot Nawowuna	Kenya	12 August 2016	Rio de Janeiro	
17	22	29:53.80	Meselech Melkamu	Ethiopia	14 June 2009	Utrecht	
	23	29:54.66	Dibaba #2		15 August 2008	Beijing	
	24	29:55.32	Hassan #4		7 August 2021	Tokyo	
	25	29:56.18	Gezahegne #2		7 August 2021	Tokyo	
18		29:59.03	Mizan Alem	Ethiopia	20 May 2023	London	
19		29:59.15	Lemlem Hailu	Ethiopia	23 June 2023	Nerja	
20		29:59.20	Meseret Defar	Ethiopia	11 July 2009	Birmingham	
21		30:00.86	Eilish McColgan	Great Britain	4 March 2023	San Juan Capistrano	
22		30:01.09	Paula Radcliffe	Great Britain	6 August 2002	Munich	
23		30:03.82	Alicia Monson	United States	4 March 2023	San Juan Capistrano	
24		30:04.18	Berhane Adere	Ethiopia	23 August 2003	Saint-Denis	
25		30:04.97	Janeth Chepngetich	Kenya	25 May 2024	Eugene	

==== Annulled marks ====
- Elvan Abeylegesse of Turkey ran 29:56.34 at the 2008 Olympics. This performance was annulled due to doping offences.

== Olympic medalists ==
=== Men ===
Games	Gold	Silver	Bronze
1912 Stockholm	Hannes Kolehmainen; Finland	Lewis Tewanima; United States	Albin Stenroos; Finland
1920 Antwerp	Paavo Nurmi; Finland	Joseph Guillemot; France	James Wilson; Great Britain
1924 Paris	Ville Ritola; Finland	Edvin Wide; Sweden	Eero Berg; Finland
1928 Amsterdam	Paavo Nurmi; Finland	Ville Ritola; Finland	Edvin Wide; Sweden
1932 Los Angeles	Janusz Kusociński; Poland	Volmari Iso-Hollo; Finland	Lasse Virtanen; Finland
1936 Berlin	Ilmari Salminen; Finland	Arvo Askola; Finland	Volmari Iso-Hollo; Finland
1948 London	Emil Zátopek; Czechoslovakia	Alain Mimoun; France	Bertil Albertsson; Sweden
1952 Helsinki	Emil Zátopek; Czechoslovakia	Alain Mimoun; France	Aleksandr Anufriyev; Soviet Union
1956 Melbourne	Vladimir Kuts; Soviet Union	József Kovács; Hungary	Al Lawrence; Australia
1960 Rome	Pyotr Bolotnikov; Soviet Union	Hans Grodotzki; United Team of Germany	Dave Power; Australia
1964 Tokyo	Billy Mills; United States	Mohammed Gammoudi; Tunisia	Ron Clarke; Australia
1968 Mexico City	Naftali Temu; Kenya	Mamo Wolde; Ethiopia	Mohammed Gammoudi; Tunisia
1972 Munich	Lasse Virén; Finland	Emiel Puttemans; Belgium	Miruts Yifter; Ethiopia
1976 Montreal	Lasse Virén; Finland	Carlos Lopes; Portugal	Brendan Foster; Great Britain
1980 Moscow	Miruts Yifter; Ethiopia	Kaarlo Maaninka; Finland	Mohamed Kedir; Ethiopia
1984 Los Angeles	Alberto Cova; Italy	Mike McLeod; Great Britain	Michael Musyoki; Kenya
1988 Seoul	Brahim Boutayeb; Morocco	Salvatore Antibo; Italy	Kipkemboi Kimeli; Kenya
1992 Barcelona	Khalid Skah; Morocco	Richard Chelimo; Kenya	Addis Abebe; Ethiopia
1996 Atlanta	Haile Gebrselassie; Ethiopia	Paul Tergat; Kenya	Saleh Hissou; Morocco
2000 Sydney	Haile Gebrselassie; Ethiopia	Paul Tergat; Kenya	Assefa Mezgebu; Ethiopia
2004 Athens	Kenenisa Bekele; Ethiopia	Sileshi Sihine; Ethiopia	Zersenay Tadese; Eritrea
2008 Beijing	Kenenisa Bekele; Ethiopia	Sileshi Sihine; Ethiopia	Micah Kogo; Kenya
2012 London	Mo Farah; Great Britain	Galen Rupp; United States	Tariku Bekele; Ethiopia
2016 Rio de Janeiro	Mo Farah; Great Britain	Paul Tanui; Kenya	Tamirat Tola; Ethiopia
2020 Tokyo	Selemon Barega; Ethiopia	Joshua Cheptegei; Uganda	Jacob Kiplimo; Uganda
2024 Paris	Joshua Cheptegei; Uganda	Berihu Aregawi; Ethiopia	Grant Fisher; United States
2028 Los Angeles			

=== Women ===
Games	Gold	Silver	Bronze
1988 Seoul	Olga Bondarenko; Soviet Union	Liz McColgan; Great Britain	Olena Zhupiyeva-Vyazova; Soviet Union
1992 Barcelona	Derartu Tulu; Ethiopia	Elana Meyer; South Africa	Lynn Jennings; United States
1996 Atlanta	Fernanda Ribeiro; Portugal	Wang Junxia; China	Gete Wami; Ethiopia
2000 Sydney	Derartu Tulu; Ethiopia	Gete Wami; Ethiopia	Fernanda Ribeiro; Portugal
2004 Athens	Xing Huina; China	Ejagayehu Dibaba; Ethiopia	Derartu Tulu; Ethiopia
2008 Beijing	Tirunesh Dibaba; Ethiopia	Shalane Flanagan; United States	Linet Masai; Kenya
2012 London	Tirunesh Dibaba; Ethiopia	Sally Kipyego; Kenya	Vivian Cheruiyot; Kenya
2016 Rio de Janeiro	Almaz Ayana; Ethiopia	Vivian Cheruiyot; Kenya	Tirunesh Dibaba; Ethiopia
2020 Tokyo	Sifan Hassan; Netherlands	Kalkidan Gezahegne; Bahrain	Letesenbet Gidey; Ethiopia
2024 Paris	Beatrice Chebet; Kenya	Nadia Battocletti; Italy	Sifan Hassan; Netherlands
2028 Los Angeles			

== World Championships medalists ==
=== Men ===
Championships	Gold	Silver	Bronze
1983 Helsinki	Alberto Cova (ITA)	Werner Schildhauer (GDR)	Hansjörg Kunze (GDR)
1987 Rome	Paul Kipkoech (KEN)	Francesco Panetta (ITA)	Hansjörg Kunze (GDR)
1991 Tokyo	Moses Tanui (KEN)	Richard Chelimo (KEN)	Khalid Skah (MAR)
1993 Stuttgart	Haile Gebrselassie (ETH)	Moses Tanui (KEN)	Richard Chelimo (KEN)
1995 Gothenburg	Haile Gebrselassie (ETH)	Khalid Skah (MAR)	Paul Tergat (KEN)
1997 Athens	Haile Gebrselassie (ETH)	Paul Tergat (KEN)	Salah Hissou (MAR)
1999 Seville	Haile Gebrselassie (ETH)	Paul Tergat (KEN)	Assefa Mezgebu (ETH)
2001 Edmonton	Charles Kamathi (KEN)	Assefa Mezgebu (ETH)	Haile Gebrselassie (ETH)
2003 Saint-Denis	Kenenisa Bekele (ETH)	Haile Gebrselassie (ETH)	Sileshi Sihine (ETH)
2005 Helsinki	Kenenisa Bekele (ETH)	Sileshi Sihine (ETH)	Moses Mosop (KEN)
2007 Osaka	Kenenisa Bekele (ETH)	Sileshi Sihine (ETH)	Martin Mathathi (KEN)
2009 Berlin	Kenenisa Bekele (ETH)	Zersenay Tadese (ERI)	Moses Ndiema Masai (KEN)
2011 Daegu	Ibrahim Jeilan (ETH)	Mo Farah (GBR)	Imane Merga (ETH)
2013 Moscow	Mo Farah (GBR)	Ibrahim Jeilan (ETH)	Paul Tanui (KEN)
2015 Beijing	Mo Farah (GBR)	Geoffrey Kamworor (KEN)	Paul Tanui (KEN)
2017 London	Mo Farah (GBR)	Joshua Cheptegei (UGA)	Paul Tanui (KEN)
2019 Doha	Joshua Cheptegei (UGA)	Yomif Kejelcha (ETH)	Andamlak Belihu (ETH)
2022 Eugene	Joshua Cheptegei (UGA)	Stanley Mburu (KEN)	Jacob Kiplimo (UGA)
2023 Budapest	Joshua Cheptegei (UGA)	Daniel Ebenyo (KEN)	Selemon Barega (ETH)
2025 Tokyo	Jimmy Gressier (FRA)	Yomif Kejelcha (ETH)	Andreas Almgren (SWE)

=== Women ===
Championships	Gold	Silver	Bronze
1987 Rome	Ingrid Kristiansen (NOR)	Yelena Zhupiyeva-Vyazova (URS)	Kathrin Weßel (GDR)
1991 Tokyo	Liz McColgan (GBR)	Zhong Huandi (CHN)	Wang Xiuting (CHN)
1993 Stuttgart	Wang Junxia (CHN)	Zhong Huandi (CHN)	Sally Barsosio (KEN)
1995 Gothenburg	Fernanda Ribeiro (POR)	Derartu Tulu (ETH)	Tegla Loroupe (KEN)
1997 Athens	Sally Barsosio (KEN)	Fernanda Ribeiro (POR)	Masako Chiba (JPN)
1999 Seville	Gete Wami (ETH)	Paula Radcliffe (GBR)	Tegla Loroupe (KEN)
2001 Edmonton	Derartu Tulu (ETH)	Berhane Adere (ETH)	Gete Wami (ETH)
2003 Saint-Denis	Berhane Adere (ETH)	Werknesh Kidane (ETH)	Sun Yingjie (CHN)
2005 Helsinki	Tirunesh Dibaba (ETH)	Berhane Adere (ETH)	Ejegayehu Dibaba (ETH)
2007 Osaka	Tirunesh Dibaba (ETH)	Kara Goucher (USA)	Jo Pavey (GBR)
2009 Berlin	Linet Masai (KEN)	Meselech Melkamu (ETH)	Wude Ayalew (ETH)
2011 Daegu	Vivian Cheruiyot (KEN)	Sally Kipyego (KEN)	Linet Masai (KEN)
2013 Moscow	Tirunesh Dibaba (ETH)	Gladys Cherono Kiprono (KEN)	Belaynesh Oljira (ETH)
2015 Beijing	Vivian Cheruiyot (KEN)	Gelete Burka (ETH)	Emily Infeld (USA)
2017 London	Almaz Ayana (ETH)	Tirunesh Dibaba (ETH)	Agnes Tirop (KEN)
2019 Doha	Sifan Hassan (NED)	Letesenbet Gidey (ETH)	Agnes Tirop (KEN)
2022 Eugene	Letesenbet Gidey (ETH)	Hellen Obiri (KEN)	Margaret Kipkemboi (KEN)
2023 Budapest	Gudaf Tsegay (ETH)	Letesenbet Gidey (ETH)	Ejgayehu Taye (ETH)
2025 Tokyo	Beatrice Chebet (KEN)	Nadia Battocletti (ITA)	Gudaf Tsegay (ETH)

== World leading times ==
=== Men ===
Year	Time	Athlete	Place
1970	28:06.2 h	Dave Bedford (GBR)	Warsaw
1971	27:47.0 h	Dave Bedford (GBR)	Portsmouth
1972	27:38.4 h	Lasse Viren (FIN)	Munich
1973	27:30.80	Dave Bedford (GBR)	London
1974	27:43.6 h	Steve Prefontaine (USA)	Eugene
1975	27:45.43	Brendan Foster (GBR)	London
1976	27:40.38	Lasse Viren (FIN)	Montreal
1977	27:30.47	Samson Kimobwa (KEN)	Helsinki
1978	27:22.47	Henry Rono (KEN)	Vienna
1979	27:36.8 h	Karl Fleschen (FRG)	Troisdorf
1980	27:29.16	Craig Virgin (USA)	Paris
1981	27:27.1 h	Fernando Mamede (POR)	Lisbon
1982	27:22.95	Fernando Mamede (POR)	Paris
1983	27:23.44	Carlos Lopes (POR)	Oslo
1984	27:13.81	Fernando Mamede (POR)	Stockholm
1985	27:37.17	Bruce Bickford (USA)	Stockholm
1986	27:20.56	Mark Nenow (USA)	Brussels
1987	27:26.95	Francesco Panetta (ITA)	Stockholm
1988	27:21.46	Brahim Boutayeb (MAR)	Seoul
1989	27:08.23	Arturo Barrios (MEX)	Berlin
1990	27:18.22	Arturo Barrios (MEX)	Berlin
1991	27:11.18	Richard Chelimo (KEN)	Hengelo
1992	27:14.26	Fita Bayisa (ETH)	Oslo
1993	26:58.38	Yobes Ondieki (KEN)	Oslo
1994	26:52.23	William Sigei (KEN)	Oslo
1995	26:43.53	Haile Gebrselassie (ETH)	Hengelo
1996	26:38.08	Salah Hissou (MAR)	Brussels
1997	26:27.85	Paul Tergat (KEN)	Brussels
1998	26:22.75	Haile Gebrselassie (ETH)	Hengelo
1999	26:51.49	Charles Kamathi (KEN)	Brussels
2000	27:03.87	Paul Tergat (KEN)	Brussels
2001	27:04.20	Abraham Chebii (KEN)	Palo Alto
2002	26:49.38	Sammy Kipketer (KEN)	Brussels
2003	26:29.22	Haile Gebrselassie (ETH)	Brussels
2004	26:20.31	Kenenisa Bekele (ETH)	Ostrava
2005	26:17.53	Kenenisa Bekele (ETH)	Brussels
2006	26:35.63	Micah Kogo (KEN)	Brussels
2007	26:46.19	Kenenisa Bekele (ETH)	Brussels
2008	26:25.97	Kenenisa Bekele (ETH)	Eugene
2009	26:46.31	Kenenisa Bekele (ETH)	Berlin
2010	26:56.74	Josphat Kiprono Menjo (KEN)	Turku
2011	26:43.16	Kenenisa Bekele (ETH)	Brussels
2012	26:51.16	Emmanuel Bett (KEN)	Brussels
2013	26:51.02	Dejen Gebremeskel (ETH)	Sollentuna
2014	26:44.36	Galen Rupp (USA)	Eugene
2015	26:50.97	Mo Farah (GBR)	Eugene
2016	26:51.11	Yigrem Demelash (ETH)	Hengelo
2017	26:49.51	Mo Farah (GBR)	London
2018	27:13.01	Stanley Mburu (KEN)	Yokohama
2019	26:48.36	Joshua Cheptegei (UGA)	Doha
2020	26:11.00	Joshua Cheptegei (UGA)	Valencia
2021	26.33.90	Jacob Kiplimo (UGA)	Ostrava
2022	26:33.84	Grant Fisher (USA)	San Juan Capistrano
2023	26:50.66	Berihu Aregawi (ETH)	Nerja
2024	26:31.01	Yomif Kejelcha (ETH)	Nerja
2025	26:43.82	Biniam Mehary (ETH)	Eugene
2026	26:56.58	Mohamed Abdilaahi (ETH)	San Juan Capistrano

=== Women ===
Year	Time	Athlete	Place
1970	35:30.5 h	Paola Pigni (ITA)	Milan
1971	34:51.0 h	Kathy Gibbons (USA)	Phoenix
1972	—	—	—
1973	—	—	—
1974	—	—	—
1975	34:01.4 h	Christa Vahlensieck (FRG)	Wolfsburg
1976	34:19.0 h	Peg Neppel (USA)	Eugene
1977	33:15.1 h	Peg Neppel (USA)	Westwood
1978	32:43.2 h	Natalia Mărăşescu (ROU)	Băile Felix
1979	32:52.5 h	Mary Shea (USA)	Walnut
1980	32:57.17	Kathryn Binns (GBR)	Sittard
1981	32:17.19	Yelena Sipatova (URS)	Moscow
1982	31:35.3 h	Mary Decker-Slaney (USA)	Eugene
1983	31:27.58	Raisa Sadreydinova (URS)	Odesa
1984	31:13.78	Olga Bondarenko (URS)	Kyiv
1985	30:59.42	Ingrid Kristiansen (NOR)	Oslo
1986	30:13.74	Ingrid Kristiansen (NOR)	Oslo
1987	31:05.85	Ingrid Kristiansen (NOR)	Rome
1988	31:05.21	Olga Bondarenko (URS)	Seoul
1989	30:48.51	Ingrid Kristiansen (NOR)	Oslo
1990	31:18.18	Viorica Ghican (ROU)	Helsinki
1991	30:57.07	Liz McColgan (GBR)	Hengelo
1992	31:06.02	Derartu Tulu (ETH)	Barcelona
1993	29:31.78	Wang Junxia (CHN)	Beijing
1994	30:50.34	Wang Junxia (CHN)	Hiroshima
1995	31:04.99	Fernanda Ribeiro (POR)	Gothenburg
1996	31:01.63	Fernanda Ribeiro (POR)	Atlanta
1997	30:38.09	Dong Yanmei (CHN)	Shanghai
1998	30:48.06	Fernanda Ribeiro (POR)	Lisbon
1999	30:24.56	Gete Wami (ETH)	Seville
2000	30:17.49	Derartu Tulu (ETH)	Sydney
2001	30:55.80	Paula Radcliffe (GBR)	Barakaldo
2002	30:01.09	Paula Radcliffe (GBR)	Munich
2003	30:04.18	Berhane Adere (ETH)	Saint-Denis
2004	30:17.15	Paula Radcliffe (GBR)	Gateshead
2005	30:15.67	Tirunesh Dibaba (ETH)	Sollentuna
2006	30:21.67	Elvan Abeylegesse (TUR)	Antalya
2007	31:00.27	Mestawet Tufa (ETH)	Valkenswaard
2008	29:54.66	Tirunesh Dibaba (ETH)	Beijing
2009	29:53.80	Meselech Melkamu (ETH)	Utrecht
2010	31:04.52	Meselech Melkamu (ETH)	Ostrava
2011	30:38.35	Sally Kipyego (KEN)	Palo Alto
2012	30:20.75	Tirunesh Dibaba (ETH)	London
2013	30:08.06	Meseret Defar (ETH)	Sollentuna
2014	30:42.26	Sally Kipyego (KEN)	Palo Alto
2015	30:49.68	Gelete Burka (ETH)	Hengelo
2016	29:17.45	Almaz Ayana (ETH)	Rio de Janeiro
2017	30:16.32	Almaz Ayana (ETH)	London
2018	30:41.85	Pauline Kamulu (KEN)	Fukagawa
2019	30:17.62	Sifan Hassan (NED)	Doha
2020	29:36.67	Sifan Hassan (NED)	Hengelo
2021	29:01.03	Letesenbet Gidey (ETH)	Hengelo
2022	30:09.94	Letesenbet Gidey (ETH)	Eugene
2023	29:29.73	Gudaf Tsegay (ETH)	Nerja
2024	28:54.14	Beatrice Chebet (KEN)	Eugene
2025	30:27.02	Janeth Chepngetich (KEN)	Nairobi
2026	30:29.16	Janeth Nyiva Mutungi (KEN)	Chitose

== Competitions ==
- European Cup 10,000m
- Iberian 10,000 Metres Championships

== See also ==
- National records in the 10,000 metres
