= List of flag bearers for Yemen at the Olympics =

Yemen at the Olympics
- IOC code: YEM
- NOC: Yemen Olympic Committee
- Website: www.nocyemen.org (in Arabic and English)
- Medals: Gold 0 Silver 0 Bronze 0 Total 0

Summer appearances
- 1992; 1996; 2000; 2004; 2008; 2012; 2016; 2020; 2024

Other related appearances
- North Yemen (1984–1988); South Yemen (1988)

This is a list of flag bearers who have represented Yemen at the Olympics.

Flag bearers carry the national flag of their country at the opening ceremony of the Olympic Games.

#	Event year	Season	Flag bearer	Sport
1	1992	Summer		
2	1996	Summer	Abdullah Al-Izani	Wrestling
3	2000	Summer	Basheer Al-Khewani	Athletics
4	2004	Summer	Akram Al-Noor	Taekwondo
5	2008	Summer	Mohammed Al-Yafaee	Athletics
6	2012	Summer	Tameem Al-Kubati	Taekwondo
7	2016	Summer	Zeyad Mater	Judo
8	2020	Summer	Yasameen Al-Raimi	Shooting
8	2020	Summer	Ahmed Ayash	Judo
9	2024	Summer	Samer Al-Yafaee	Athletics

== See also ==
- Yemen at the Olympics
