= Yemen at the 2000 Summer Olympics =

- IOC code: YEM
- NOC: Yemen Olympic Committee

in Sydney
- Competitors: 2 in 1 sport
- Flag bearer: Basheer Al-Khewani (opening)
- Medals: Gold 0 Silver 0 Bronze 0 Total 0

Summer Olympics appearances (overview)
- 1992; 1996; 2000; 2004; 2008; 2012; 2016; 2020; 2024

Other related appearances
- North Yemen (1984–1988); South Yemen (1988)

Yemen sent a delegation to compete at the 2000 Summer Olympics in Sydney, Australia from 15 September to 1 October 2000. This was their third appearance at a Summer Olympic Games as a unified country. The Yemeni delegation consisted of two track and field athletes, Basheer Al-Khewani and Hana Ali Saleh. Neither advanced beyond the first round of their respective events.

== Background ==
The Yemen Olympic Committee was recognized by the International Olympic Committee on 1 January 1981. Both North Yemen and South Yemen made appearances at the Olympics in the 1980s. Following Yemeni Unification in 1990, the nation has sent a single team to every Olympics since the 1992 Summer Olympics. This made Sydney the third appearance at an Olympics by a unified Yemen, and the nation has yet to debut in the Winter Olympic Games. The 2000 Summer Olympics were held from 15 September to 1 October 2000; a total of 10,651 athletes represented 199 National Olympic Committees. Yemen sent two track and field competitors to Sydney, Basheer Al-Khewani and Hana Ali Saleh. Al-Khewani was selected as the flag-bearer for the opening ceremony.

== Athletics ==
Basheer Al-Khewani was 18 years old at the time of the Sydney Olympics, and was making his only Olympic appearance. On 22 September he took part in the first round of the men's 400 meters, and was drawn into heat eight. He finished his race in a time of 49.72 seconds, eighth and last in his heat, and was therefore eliminated. The gold medal was won by Michael Johnson of the United States in 43.84 seconds, the silver was taken by fellow American Alvin Harrison, and the bronze medal was earned by Greg Haughton of Jamaica.

Hana Ali Saleh was 32 years old at the time, and also making her only appearance at an Olympic Games. She was the first woman to represent Yemen at the Olympics. On 27 September she took part in the first round of the women's 200 meters, and was drawn into heat two. She finished the race in 30.36 seconds, eighth and last in her heat. Her time was over six seconds behind seventh place; therefore she was eliminated at this stage. Original gold medalist Marion Jones of the United States was stripped of her medal in December 2007 after admitting to doping violations. Original silver medalist Pauline Davis-Thompson of the Bahamas received the gold medal in June 2010.

Athlete	Event	Heat		Quarterfinal		Semifinal		Final	
Athlete	Event	Time	Rank	Time	Rank	Time	Rank	Time	Rank
Basheer Al-Khewani	Men's 400 m	49.72	8	did not advance					
Hana Ali Saleh	Women's 200 m	30.36	8	did not advance					

- Note–Ranks given for track events are within the athlete's heat only
