= Yemen at the 2004 Summer Olympics =

- IOC code: YEM
- NOC: Yemen Olympic Committee

in Athens
- Competitors: 3 in 3 sports
- Flag bearer: Akram Abdullah
- Medals: Gold 0 Silver 0 Bronze 0 Total 0

Summer Olympics appearances (overview)
- 1992; 1996; 2000; 2004; 2008; 2012; 2016; 2020; 2024

Other related appearances
- North Yemen (1984–1988); South Yemen (1988)

Yemen was represented at the 2004 Summer Olympics in Athens, Greece by the Yemen Olympic Committee.

In total, three athletes – all men – represented Yemen in three different sports including athletics, swimming and taekwondo.

== Background ==
Yemeni athletes had previously competed at the Olympics as representatives of North Yemen and South Yemen. Their Olympic committees merged to form the Yemen Olympic Committee in 1990 when the two countries merged into one. Yemen as one nation made its Olympic debut at the 1992 Summer Olympics in Barcelona, Spain with a record delegation of eight athletes. The 2004 Summer Olympics in Athens, Greece marked Yemen's fourth appearance at the Summer Olympics.

== Competitors ==
In total, three athletes represented Yemen at the 2004 Summer Olympics in Athens, Greece across three different sports.

Sport	Men	Women	Total
Athletics	1	0	1
Swimming	1	0	1
Taekwondo	1	0	1
Total	3	0	3

== Athletics ==
In total, one Yemeni athlete participated in the athletics events – Saeed Al-Adhreai in the men's 400 m.

Most of the athletics events, including those which Yemeni athletes took part in, took place at the Athens Olympic Stadium in Marousi, Athens from 18 to 29 August 2004.

Men

Athlete	Event	Heat		Semifinal		Final	
Athlete	Event	Result	Rank	Result	Rank	Result	Rank
Saeed Al-Adhreai	400 m	49.39	8	did not advance			

== Swimming ==
In total, one Yemeni athlete participated in the swimming events – Mohamed Saad in the men's 50 m freestyle.

The swimming events took place at the Athens Olympic Aquatic Centre in Marousi, Athens from 14 to 21 August 2004.

Athlete	Event	Heat		Semifinal		Final	
Athlete	Event	Time	Rank	Time	Rank	Time	Rank
Mohamed Saad	50 m freestyle	29.97	80	did not advance			

== Taekwondo ==
In total, one Yemeni athlete participated in the taekwondo events – Akram Abdullah in the men's −58 kg category.

The taekwondo events took place at the Faliro Coastal Zone Olympic Complex in Piraeus, Athens from 25 to 28 August 2004.

Athlete	Event	Round of 16	Quarterfinals	Semifinals	Repechage 1	Repechage 2	Final / BM	
Athlete	Event	Opposition Result	Opposition Result	Opposition Result	Opposition Result	Opposition Result	Opposition Result	Rank
Akram Abdullah	Men's −58 kg	Shaposhnyk (UKR); L 5–7	did not advance					

== See also ==
- Yemen at the 2002 Asian Games
