= Yemen at the 2020 Summer Olympics =

- IOC code: YEM
- NOC: Yemen Olympic Committee

in Tokyo, Japan July 23, 2021 – August 8, 2021
- Competitors: 5 in 4 sports
- Flag bearers (opening): Yasameen Al Raimi; Ahmed Ayash
- Flag bearer (closing): N/A
- Medals: Gold 0 Silver 0 Bronze 0 Total 0

Summer Olympics appearances (overview)
- 1992; 1996; 2000; 2004; 2008; 2012; 2016; 2020; 2024

Other related appearances
- North Yemen (1984–1988); South Yemen (1988)

Yemen competed at the 2020 Summer Olympics in Tokyo. Originally scheduled to take place from 24 July to 9 August 2020, the Games were postponed to 23 July to 8 August 2021, because of the COVID-19 pandemic.

== Competitors ==
The following is the list of number of competitors in the Games.

Sport	Men	Women	Total
Athletics	1	0	1
Judo	1	0	1
Shooting	0	1	1
Swimming	1	1	2
Total	3	2	5

== Athletics ==
Yemen received universality slots from IAAF to send one athletes to the Olympics.

Key

- Note–Ranks given for track events are within the athlete's heat only
- Q = Qualified for the next round
- q = Qualified for the next round as a fastest loser or, in field events, by position without achieving the qualifying target
- NR = National record
- N/A = Round not applicable for the event
- Bye = Athlete not required to compete in round

Track & road events

Athlete	Event	Heat		Semifinal		Final	
Athlete	Event	Result	Rank	Result	Rank	Result	Rank
Ahmed Al-Yaari	Men's 400 m	48.53	8	Did not advance			

== Judo ==
Yemen entered one male judoka into the Olympic tournament after International Judo Federation awarded them a tripartite invitation quota.

Athlete	Event	Round of 64	Round of 32	Round of 16	Quarterfinals	Semifinals	Repechage	Final / BM	
Athlete	Event	Opposition Result	Opposition Result	Opposition Result	Opposition Result	Opposition Result	Opposition Result	Opposition Result	Rank
Ahmed Ayash	Men's –73 kg	Gjakova (KOS); L 00–10	Did not advance						

== Shooting ==
Yemen received an invitation from the Tripartite Commission to send a women's pistol shooter to the Olympics, as long as the minimum qualifying score (MQS) was met, marking the nation's Olympic debut in the sport.

Athlete	Event	Qualification		Final	
Athlete	Event	Points	Rank	Points	Rank
Yasameen Al Raimi	Women's 10 m air pistol	551	52	Did not advance	

Qualification Legend: Q = Qualify for the next round; q = Qualify for the bronze medal (shotgun)

== Swimming ==
Yemen received a universality invitation from FINA to send two top-ranked swimmers (one per gender) in their respective individual events to the Olympics, based on the FINA Points System of June 28, 2021.

Athlete	Event	Heat		Semifinal		Final	
Athlete	Event	Time	Rank	Time	Rank	Time	Rank
Mokhtar Al-Yamani	Men's 100 m freestyle	50.52	47	Did not advance			
Mokhtar Al-Yamani	Men's 200 m freestyle	1:49.97	36	Did not advance			
Nooran Ba-Matraf	Women's 100 m breaststroke	1:27.79	42	Did not advance			
