= Yemen at the 2024 Summer Olympics =

- IOC code: YEM
- NOC: Yemen Olympic Committee

in Paris, France 26 July 2024 – 11 August 2024
- Competitors: 4 (3 men and 1 woman) in 4 sports
- Flag bearer: Samer Al-Yafaee
- Medals: Gold 0 Silver 0 Bronze 0 Total 0

Summer Olympics appearances (overview)
- 1992; 1996; 2000; 2004; 2008; 2012; 2016; 2020; 2024

Other related appearances
- North Yemen (1984–1988); South Yemen (1988)

Yemen competed at the 2024 Summer Olympics in Paris from 26 July to 11 August 2024. This was the nation's ninth appearance at the Summer Olympics since its official debut as a unified nation of North and South Yemen at 1992.

== Competitors ==
The following is the list of number of competitors in the Games.

Sport	Men	Women	Total
Athletics	1	0	1
Judo	1	0	1
Shooting	0	1	1
Swimming	1	0	1
Total	3	1	4

== Athletics ==
Yemen sent one sprinter to compete at the 2024 Summer Olympics.

Key

- Note–Ranks given for track events are within the athlete's heat only
- Q = Qualified for the next round
- q = Qualified for the next round as a fastest loser or, in field events, by position without achieving the qualifying target
- NR = National record
- PB = Personal best
- N/A = Round not applicable for the event
- Bye = Athlete not required to compete in round

Track events

Athlete	Event	Preliminary		Heat		Semifinal		Final	
Athlete	Event	Result	Rank	Result	Rank	Result	Rank	Result	Rank
Samer Al-Yafaee	Men's 100 m	11.54 PB	8	Did not advance					

== Judo ==
Yemen qualified one judoka for the following weight class at the Games. Hesham Makabr qualified for the games through the allocations of universality places.

Athlete	Event	Round of 32	Round of 16	Quarterfinals	Semifinals	Repechage	Final / BM	
Athlete	Event	Opposition Result	Opposition Result	Opposition Result	Opposition Result	Opposition Result	Opposition Result	Rank
Hesham Makabr	Men's –60 kg	McKenzie (JAM); L 00–10	Did not advance					

== Shooting ==
A Yemeni shooter achieved a quota place for Paris 2024 based on the allocations of universality spots.

Athlete	Event	Qualification		Final	
Athlete	Event	Points	Rank	Points	Rank
Yasameen Al-Raimi	Women's 10 m air pistol	559	40	Did not advance	

== Swimming ==
Yemen sent one swimmer to compete at the 2024 Paris Olympics.

Athlete	Event	Heat		Semifinal		Final	
Athlete	Event	Time	Rank	Time	Rank	Time	Rank
Yusuf Nasser	Men's 100 m butterfly	1:08.72	40	Did not advance			

Qualifiers for the latter rounds (Q) of all events were decided on a time only basis, therefore positions shown are overall results versus competitors in all heats.
