= Yemen at the 2008 Summer Olympics =

- IOC code: YEM
- NOC: Yemen Olympic Committee

in Beijing
- Competitors: 5 in 4 sports
- Flag bearer: Mohammed Al-Yafaee
- Medals: Gold 0 Silver 0 Bronze 0 Total 0

Summer Olympics appearances (overview)
- 1992; 1996; 2000; 2004; 2008; 2012; 2016; 2020; 2024

Other related appearances
- North Yemen (1984–1988); South Yemen (1988)

Yemen competed at the 2008 Summer Olympics in Beijing, China.

== Athletics ==
Neither Yemeni runner managed to qualify out of their opening heats, though Waseelah Saad set a new national record in the women's 100 metres.

Key

- Note–Ranks given for track events are within the athlete's heat only
- Q = Qualified for the next round
- q = Qualified for the next round as a fastest loser or, in field events, by position without achieving the qualifying target
- NR = National record
- N/A = Round not applicable for the event
- Bye = Athlete not required to compete in round

Men

Athlete	Event	Heat		Semifinal		Final	
Athlete	Event	Result	Rank	Result	Rank	Result	Rank
Mohammed Al-Yafaee	800 m	1:54.82	8	did not advance			

Women

Athlete	Event	Heat		Quarterfinal		Semifinal		Final	
Athlete	Event	Result	Rank	Result	Rank	Result	Rank	Result	Rank
Waseelah Saad	100 m	13.60	8	did not advance					

== Gymnastics ==
=== Artistic ===
Nashwan Al-Harazi completed routines on three of the six apparatus, with his best showing on vault, where he was 60th with his first attempt. He did attempt to qualify for the vault final by taking a second attempt, but ended up in last place in the 2-vault standings.

Men

Athlete	Event	Qualification								Final							
Athlete	Event	Apparatus						Total	Rank	Apparatus						Total	Rank
Athlete	Event	F	PH	R	V	PB	HB	Total	Rank	F	PH	R	V	PB	HB	Total	Rank
Nashwan Al-Harazi	Floor	13.250	—N/a					13.250	75	did not advance							
Nashwan Al-Harazi	Pommel horse	—N/a	12.525	—N/a				12.525	74	did not advance							
Nashwan Al-Harazi	Vault	—N/a			15.250	—N/a		15.250	16	did not advance							

== Judo ==
Yemen's lone judoka in Beijing lost his first round match and was eliminated.

Athlete	Event	Round of 64	Round of 32	Round of 16	Quarterfinals	Semifinals	Repechage 1	Repechage 2	Repechage 3	Final / BM	
Athlete	Event	Opposition Result	Opposition Result	Opposition Result	Opposition Result	Opposition Result	Opposition Result	Opposition Result	Opposition Result	Opposition Result	Rank
Ali Khousrof	Men's −60 kg	Bye	Kishmakov (RUS); L 0000–0200	did not advance							

== Swimming ==
The only swimmer representing Yemen in Beijing failed to advance from the heats.

Men

Athlete	Events	Heat		Semifinal		Final	
Athlete	Events	Result	Rank	Result	Rank	Result	Rank
Abdulsalam Al Gadabi	50 m freestyle	30.63	94	did not advance			
