= Yemen at the 2016 Summer Olympics =

- IOC code: YEM
- NOC: Yemen Olympic Committee

in Rio de Janeiro
- Competitors: 3 in 3 sports
- Flag bearer: Zeyad Mater
- Medals: Gold 0 Silver 0 Bronze 0 Total 0

Summer Olympics appearances (overview)
- 1992; 1996; 2000; 2004; 2008; 2012; 2016; 2020; 2024

Other related appearances
- North Yemen (1984–1988); South Yemen (1988)

Yemen competed at the 2016 Summer Olympics in Rio de Janeiro, Brazil, from 5 to 21 August 2016. This was the nation's seventh consecutive appearance at the Summer Olympics, since its reunification in 1990.

Three Yemeni athletes, two men and one woman, were selected to the team to compete each in athletics, judo, and swimming. All of them made their Olympic debut in Rio de Janeiro, with lightweight judoka Zeyad Mater leading the Yemeni delegation as the nation's flag bearer in the opening ceremony. Yemen, however, has yet to win its first ever Olympic medal.

== Athletics ==
Yemen has received a universality slot from IAAF to send a male athlete to the Olympics.

Key

- Note–Ranks given for track events are within the athlete's heat only
- Q = Qualified for the next round
- q = Qualified for the next round as a fastest loser or, in field events, by position without achieving the qualifying target
- NR = National record
- N/A = Round not applicable for the event
- Bye = Athlete not required to compete in round

Track & road events

Athlete	Event	Heat		Semifinal		Final	
Athlete	Event	Result	Rank	Result	Rank	Result	Rank
Mohammed Rageh	Men's 1500 m	3:58.99	14	did not advance			

== Judo ==
Yemen has received an invitation from the Tripartite Commission to send a judoka competing in the men's lightweight category (73 kg) to the Olympics.

Athlete	Event	Round of 64	Round of 32	Round of 16	Quarterfinals	Semifinals	Repechage	Final / BM	
Athlete	Event	Opposition Result	Opposition Result	Opposition Result	Opposition Result	Opposition Result	Opposition Result	Opposition Result	Rank
Zeyad Mater	Men's −73 kg	Bye	Scvortov (UAE); L 000–010	did not advance					

== Swimming ==
Yemen has received a universality invitation from FINA to send two swimmers to the Olympics, signifying the nation's Olympic return to the sport after an eight-year hiatus.

Athlete	Event	Heat		Semifinal		Final	
Athlete	Event	Time	Rank	Time	Rank	Time	Rank
Nooran Ba Matraf	Women's 100 m butterfly	1:11.16	43	did not advance			
