= Athletics at the 1983 Summer Universiade – Men's 5000 metres =

The men's 5000 metres event at the 1983 Summer Universiade was held at the Commonwealth Stadium in Edmonton, Canada on 10 and 11 July 1983.

== Medalists ==
Gold	Silver	Bronze
Steve Harris; Great Britain	Féthi Baccouche; Tunisia	Shuichi Yoneshige; Japan

== Results ==
=== Heats ===
Rank	Heat	Athlete	Nationality	Time	Notes
1	2	Agapius Masong	Tanzania	14:07.53	Q
2	2	Paul Williams	Canada	14:10.20	Q
3	2	Luís Horta	Portugal	14:11.21	Q
4	1	Gerardo Alcalá	Mexico	14:12.01	Q
4	2	Franco Boffi	Italy	14:12.01	Q
6	2	Féthi Baccouche	Tunisia	14:13.48	Q
7	2	John Bowden	New Zealand	14:14.87	Q
8	1	Steve Harris	Great Britain	14:15.61	Q
9	2	Jeff Drenth	United States	14:19.31	q
10	1	Juan Antonio García	Spain	14:20.06	Q
11	1	Shuichi Yoneshige	Japan	14:20.81	Q
12	1	Piero Selvaggio	Italy	14:21.52	Q
13	1	John Idstrom	United States	14:22.07	Q
14	2	Ali Mohamed Hufane	Somalia	14:27.74	q
15	1	Larbi El Mouadden	Morocco	14:28.58	q
15	1	Paul McCloy	Canada	14:28.58	q
17	2	Roberto López	Mexico	14:33.83	
18	1	César Pérez	Puerto Rico	15:00.15	
19	2	Brian Matsa	Swaziland	16:41.23	
	1	Mohamad Milad	Libya	DNF	
	1	Harald Hudak	West Germany	DNF	
	2	Peter Daenens	Belgium	DNF	

=== Final ===
Rank	Athlete	Nationality	Time	Notes
1st place, gold medalist(s)	Steve Harris	Great Britain	13:46.99	
2nd place, silver medalist(s)	Féthi Baccouche	Tunisia	13:47.69	
3rd place, bronze medalist(s)	Shuichi Yoneshige	Japan	13:48.13	
4	Gerardo Alcalá	Mexico	13:48.60	
5	Juan Antonio García	Spain	13:48.97	
6	Luís Horta	Portugal	13:51.32	
7	Franco Boffi	Italy	14:06.35	
8	Paul McCloy	Canada	14:11.46	
9	Jeff Drenth	United States	14:17.43	
10	John Bowden	New Zealand	14:19.75	
11	Larbi El Mouadden	Morocco	14:23.67	
12	Ali Mohamed Hufane	Somalia	14:25.47	
13	John Idstrom	United States	14:26.56	
	Paul Williams	Canada	DQ	
	Agapius Masong	Tanzania	DQ	
	Piero Selvaggio	Italy	DNF	
