= Yemen at the 2012 Summer Olympics =

- IOC code: YEM
- NOC: Yemen Olympic Committee

in London
- Competitors: 4 in 3 sports
- Flag bearers: Tameem Al-Kubati (opening); Nabil Mohammed Al-Garbi (closing)
- Medals: Gold 0 Silver 0 Bronze 0 Total 0

Summer Olympics appearances (overview)
- 1992; 1996; 2000; 2004; 2008; 2012; 2016; 2020; 2024

Other related appearances
- North Yemen (1984–1988); South Yemen (1988)

Yemen competed at the 2012 Summer Olympics in London, from 27 July to 12 August 2012. This was the nation's sixth consecutive appearance at the Olympics since its reunification in 1990.

The Yemen Olympic Committee selected a team of four athletes, three men and one woman, to compete in three sports. Among the Yemeni athletes, judoka Ali Khousrof only made his second consecutive Olympic appearance. Taekwondo jin and 2011 Pan Arab Games champion Tameem Al-Kubati was the nation's flag bearer at the opening ceremony. Yemen, however, has yet to win its first ever Olympic medal.

== Athletics ==
Yemen has selected 2 athletes by a wildcard.

Key

- Note–Ranks given for track events are within the athlete's heat only
- Q = Qualified for the next round
- q = Qualified for the next round as a fastest loser or, in field events, by position without achieving the qualifying target
- NR = National record
- N/A = Round not applicable for the event
- Bye = Athlete not required to compete in round

Men

| Athlete | Event | Heat | | Semifinal | | Final | |
| Athlete | Event | Result | Rank | Result | Rank | Result | Rank |
|---|---|---|---|---|---|---|---|
| Nabil Mohammed Al-Garbi | 1500 m | 3:55.46 | 14 | did not advance | | | |

Women

| Athlete | Event | Heat | | Quarterfinal | | Semifinal | | Final | |
| Athlete | Event | Result | Rank | Result | Rank | Result | Rank | Result | Rank |
|---|---|---|---|---|---|---|---|---|---|
| Fatima Sulaiman Dahman | 100 m | 13.95 | 8 | did not advance | | | | | |

== Judo ==
| Athlete | Event | Round of 64 | Round of 32 | Round of 16 | Quarterfinals | Semifinals | Repechage | Final / BM | |
| Athlete | Event | Opposition Result | Opposition Result | Opposition Result | Opposition Result | Opposition Result | Opposition Result | Opposition Result | Rank |
|---|---|---|---|---|---|---|---|---|---|
| Ali Khousrof | Men's −60 kg | Bye | Siccardi (MON); L 0012–0101 | did not advance | | | | | |

== Taekwondo ==
Yemen was given a wild card entrant.

| Athlete | Event | Round of 16 | Quarterfinals | Semifinals | Repechage | Bronze Medal | Final | |
| Athlete | Event | Opposition Result | Opposition Result | Opposition Result | Opposition Result | Opposition Result | Opposition Result | Rank |
|---|---|---|---|---|---|---|---|---|
| Tameem Al-Kubati | Men's −58 kg | Mercedes (DOM); W 8–3 | Muñoz (COL); L 2–14 PTG | did not advance | | | | |
