= Yemen at the 1996 Summer Olympics =

Coordinates: 33.748874°N 84.390735°W

- IOC code: YEM
- NOC: Yemen Olympic Committee

in Atlanta
- Competitors: 4 in 2 sports
- Flag bearer: Abdullah Al-Izani
- Medals: Gold 0 Silver 0 Bronze 0 Total 0

Summer Olympics appearances (overview)
- 1992; 1996; 2000; 2004; 2008; 2012; 2016; 2020; 2024

Other related appearances
- North Yemen (1984–1988); South Yemen (1988)

Yemen competed at the 1996 Summer Olympics in Atlanta, United States.

== Athletics ==
Key

- Note–Ranks given for track events are within the athlete's heat only
- Q = Qualified for the next round
- q = Qualified for the next round as a fastest loser or, in field events, by position without achieving the qualifying target
- NR = National record
- N/A = Round not applicable for the event
- Bye = Athlete not required to compete in round

Track & road events

Athlete	Event	Heat		Semifinal		Final	
Athlete	Event	Result	Rank	Result	Rank	Result	Rank
Anwar Mohamed Ali	Men's 400 m	50.81	7	did not advance			
Saeed Basweidan	Men's 800 m	1:49.35	6	did not advance			
Mohamed Al-Saadi	Men's marathon	n/a				2-40:41	101

== Wrestling ==
Greco-Roman

Athlete	Event	Round 1	Round 2	Round 3	Round 4	Round 5	Final / BM	
Athlete	Event	Opposition Result	Opposition Result	Opposition Result	Opposition Result	Opposition Result	Opposition Result	Rank
Abdullah Al-Izani	−48 kg	Tsenov (BUL); L 0-10	Zahidov (AZE); L 0-11	did not advance				19
