= Yemen at the 1992 Summer Olympics =

- IOC code: YEM
- NOC: Yemen Olympic Committee

in Barcelona
- Competitors: 8 in 2 sports
- Officials: 16
- Medals: Gold 0 Silver 0 Bronze 0 Total 0

Summer Olympics appearances (overview)
- 1992; 1996; 2000; 2004; 2008; 2012; 2016; 2020; 2024

Other related appearances
- North Yemen (1984–1988); South Yemen (1988)

Yemen competed at the 1992 Summer Olympics in Barcelona, Spain. Before Yemenite reunification in 1990, North Yemen and South Yemen had competed as independent teams.

== Competitors ==
The following is the list of number of competitors in the Games.

Sport	Men	Women	Total
Athletics	3	0	3
Judo	5	0	5
Total	8	0	8

== Athletics ==
Key

- Note–Ranks given for track events are within the athlete's heat only
- Q = Qualified for the next round
- q = Qualified for the next round as a fastest loser or, in field events, by position without achieving the qualifying target
- NR = National record
- N/A = Round not applicable for the event
- Bye = Athlete not required to compete in round

Track & road events

Athlete	Event	Heat		Semifinal		Final	
Athlete	Event	Result	Rank	Result	Rank	Result	Rank
Anwar Mohamed	Men's 800 m	1:52.71	7	did not advance			
Awad Salah Nasser	Men's 1500 m	3:51.89	11	did not advance			
Khalid Al-Estashi	Men's 10000 m	30:49.58	26	n/a		did not advance	

== Judo ==
Athlete	Event	Round of 64	Round of 32	Round of 16	Quarterfinals	Semifinals	Repechage	Final / BM	
Athlete	Event	Opposition Result	Opposition Result	Opposition Result	Opposition Result	Opposition Result	Opposition Result	Opposition Result	Rank
Salah Al-Humaidi (Note: Also spelt as: Salah Al-Humidi; Salah A.Y. Al-Humaidi.)	Men's −60 kg	Bye	Pradayrol (FRA); L	did not advance					
Mansour Al-Soraihi	Men's −65 kg	Bye	Byala (IND); L	did not advance					
Mohamed Al-Jalai	Men's −71 kg	Vargas (ESA); L	did not advance						
Ahmed Al-Shiekh	Men's −78 kg	Bye	Dorjbat (MGL); L	did not advance					
Yahia Mufarrih	Men's −86 kg	Bye	Filipov (BUL); L	did not advance					
