= Athletics at the 1984 Summer Olympics – Men's 5000 metres =

Men's 5000 metres at the Games of the XXIII Olympiad
- Venues: Los Angeles Memorial Coliseum
- Dates: August 8, 1984 (round 1); August 9, 1984 (semifinals); August 11, 1984 (final)
- Competitors: 56 from 40 nations
- Winning time: 13:05.59 OR

Medalists
1st place, gold medalist(s)		Saïd Aouita; Morocco
2nd place, silver medalist(s)		Markus Ryffel; Switzerland
3rd place, bronze medalist(s)		António Leitão; Portugal

These are the official results of the Men's 5000 metres event at the 1984 Summer Olympics in Los Angeles, California.

== Abbreviations ==
Q	automatic qualification
q	qualification by rank
DNS	did not start
NM	no mark
OR	olympic record
WR	world record
AR	area record
NR	national record
PB	personal best
SB	season best

== Records ==
These were the standing world and Olympic records (in minutes) prior to the 1984 Summer Olympics.

World record	13:00.41	(United Kingdom) David Moorcroft	Oslo (NOR)	July 7, 1982
Olympic record	13:20.34	(United Kingdom) Brendan Foster	Montreal (CAN)	July 28, 1976

== Final ==
Unlike many other major international championships long-distance running finals, this race was run at a consistently fast pace. The two Portuguese runners who had qualified for the final, Antonio Leitão and Ezequiel Canario, clearly tried to exhaust the strongest pre-final favourites, such as Morocco's Saïd Aouita. Canario set the stage for this classic showdown between Aouita, Leitão and Switzerland's Markus Ryffel by taking the lead already on the first bend. By 800 metres, the world record holder, Britain's David Moorcroft, had already dropped to the last place. At 1,000 metres, Canario was still leading in 2:37.73. Moorcroft was painstakingly trying to remain in the lead group, with a four- or five-metre gap between him and New Zealand's John Walker. By 1,200 metres, when Leitão moved into the lead, Moorcroft dropped decisively from the lead group. At 2,000 metres, Leitão led in 5:17.76. During the third kilometre, Leitão and Canario alternated in the lead, while Ireland's Raymond Flynn and Britain's Eamonn Martin started to struggle. Flynn dropped from the lead group before 3,000 metres, which Leitão reached, still leading the field, in 7:59.25. Shortly after 3,000 metres, Martin and Sweden's Mats Erixon lost contact with the lead group. Between 3,400 and 3,800 metres, also Kenya's Wilson Waigwa, Canario, the United States' Doug Padilla and Walker had to let the six-man lead group escape from them. At 4,000 metres, Leitão kept leading the race, with his split time of 10:38.76 suggesting that the final's winner would break 13:10. Aouita, Ryffel, Britain's Tim Hutchings, Kenya's Paul Kipkoech and another Kenyan, Charles Cheruiyot, were still following Leitão. Before 4,200 metres, Cheruiyot dropped from Leitão's pace, and by 4,500 metres, Kipkoech and Hutchings tired out as well. At 4,600 metres, Leitão led in 12:10.40. On the last back straight, Aouita and Ryffel passed Leitão. On the final bend, Aouita stretched his lead over Ryffel to five metres. Despite slowing down somewhat near the finish line, Aouita finished ahead of Ryffel by nearly two seconds. (See for example YouTube (user: tommytempo1); Suuri Olympiateos / The Great Olympic Book, Helsinki, Finland, 1984.)

RANK	FINAL	TIME
	Saïd Aouita (MAR)	13:05.59 OR
	Markus Ryffel (SUI)	13:07.54
	António Leitão (POR)	13:09.20
4.	Tim Hutchings (GBR)	13:11.50
5.	Paul Kipkoech (KEN)	13:14.40
6.	Charles Cheruiyot (KEN)	13:18.41
7.	Doug Padilla (USA)	13:23.56
8.	John Walker (NZL)	13:24.46
9.	Ezequiel Canário (POR)	13:26.50
10.	Wilson Waigwa (KEN)	13:27.34
11.	Ray Flynn (IRL)	13:34.50
12.	Mats Erixon (SWE)	13:41.64
13.	Eamonn Martin (GBR)	13:53.34
14.	David Moorcroft (GBR)	14:16.61
–	Martti Vainio (FIN)	DNS ^{1}

^{1} Vainio was not permitted to start in the final after he tested positive for metenolone following the 10000 meters final.

== Semifinals ==
- Top six in each heat and next three fastest advanced to the final

RANK	HEAT 1	TIME
1.	Wilson Waigwa (KEN)	13:38.59
2.	António Leitão (POR)	13:39.76
3.	Markus Ryffel (SUI)	13:40.08
4.	Ray Flynn (IRL)	13:40.74
5.	Eamonn Martin (GBR)	13:41.70
6.	Doug Padilla (USA)	13:41.73
7.	Zakariah Barie (TAN)	13:43.49
8.	Gerardo Alcala (MEX)	13:45.98
9.	Paul Williams (CAN)	13:46.34
10.	Steve Lacy (USA)	13:46.65
11.	Omar Aguilar (CHI)	13:51.13
12.	Zephaniah Ncube (ZIM)	13:53.25
13.	Abdelrazzak Bounor (ALG)	13:57.43
14.	Antti Loikkanen (FIN)	13:58.74
–	Uwe Mönkemeyer (FRG)	DNF

RANK	HEAT 2	TIME
1.	Saïd Aouita (MAR)	13:28.39
2.	David Moorcroft (GBR)	13:28.44
3.	John Walker (NZL)	13:28.48
4.	Charles Cheruiyot (KEN)	13:28.56
5.	Tim Hutchings (GBR)	13:28.60
6.	Paul Kipkoech (KEN)	13:29.08
7.	Mats Erixon (SWE)	13:29.72
8.	Martti Vainio (FIN)	13:30.48
9.	Ezequiel Canário (POR)	13:32.64
10.	João Campos (POR)	13:34.46
11.	Eduardo Castro (MEX)	13:42.04
12.	Don Clary (USA)	13:46.02
13.	Bob Verbeeck (BEL)	13:46.03
14.	Salvatore Antibo (ITA)	13:47.53
–	Christoph Herle (FRG)	DNF

== Qualifying heats ==
- Top six in each heat and next six fastest advanced to the semi-finals

=== Heat 1 ===
RANK	HEAT 1	TIME
1.	Ezequiel Canário (POR)	13:43.28
2.	Martti Vainio (FIN)	13:45.16
3.	Tim Hutchings (GBR)	13:46.01
4.	Ray Flynn (IRL)	13:46.84
5.	Wilson Waigwa (KEN)	13:48.84
6.	Doug Padilla (USA)	13:52.56
7.	Vincent Rousseau (BEL)	13:57.96
8.	José João da Silva (BRA)	14:03.44
9.	Jorge García (ESP)	14:12.15
10.	Mohamed Rutitinga (TAN)	14:27.78
11.	Julio Gómez (ARG)	14:28.48
12.	George Mambosasa (MAW)	14:48.08
13.	Basil Kilani (JOR)	15:20.58
14.	Nimley Twegbe (LBR)	17:36.69
–	Ali Mohamed Hufane (SOM)	DNF

=== Heat 2 ===
RANK	HEAT 2	TIME
1.	Mats Erixon (SWE)	13:44.45
2.	John Walker (NZL)	13:44.75
3.	Don Clary (USA)	13:44.97
4.	Saïd Aouita (MAR)	13:45.66
5.	Bob Verbeeck (BEL)	13:46.27
6.	Christoph Herle (FRG)	13:46.35
7.	Paul Williams (CAN)	13:47.56
8.	Stijn Jaspers (NED)	13:58.51
9.	Ahmed Musa Jouda (SUD)	13:59.41
10.	Piero Selvaggio (ITA)	14:04.74
11.	Necdet Ayaz (TUR)	14:36.89
12.	Eugène Muslar (BIZ)	15:05.78
13.	John Tau (PNG)	15:24.68
14.	Ruddy Cornielle (DOM)	17:16.77
–	Fethi Baccouche (TUN)	DNF

=== Heat 3 ===
RANK	HEAT 3	TIME
1.	Charles Cheruiyot (KEN)	13:45.99
2.	Eamonn Martin (GBR)	13:46.16
3.	Markus Ryffel (SUI)	13:46.16
4.	Steve Lacy (USA)	13:46.16
5.	João Campos (POR)	13:46.27
6.	Salvatore Antibo (ITA)	13:46.32
7.	Zephaniah Ncube (ZIM)	13:46.33
8.	Uwe Mönkemeyer (FRG)	13:48.66
9.	Gerardo Alcala (MEX)	13:50.60
10.	Arie Gamliel (ISR)	14:02.98
11.	Alphonse Swai (TAN)	14:22.20
12.	Luis Tipán (ECU)	14:52.43
13.	Ramón López (PAR)	15:15.64

=== Heat 4 ===
RANK	HEAT 4	TIME
1.	António Leitão (POR)	13:51.33
2.	Dave Moorcroft (GBR)	13:51.40
3.	Eduardo Castro (MEX)	13:51.46
4.	Antti Loikkanen (FIN)	13:51.47
5.	Abderrazak Bounour (ALG)	13:51.52
6.	Omar Aguilar (CHI)	13:51.53
7.	Paul Kipkoech (KEN)	13:51.54
8.	Zakariah Barie (TAN)	13:53.00
9.	Antonio Selvaggio (ITA)	13:55.73
10.	Roger Soler (PER)	14:28.26
11.	Orlando Mora (CRC)	14:33.49
12.	Masini Situ-Kumbanga (ZAI)	15:02.52
13.	Ali Al-Ghadi (YAR)	16:06.58

== See also ==
- 1982 Men's European Championships 5.000 metres (Athens)
- 1983 Men's World Championships 5.000 metres (Helsinki)
- 1984 Men's Friendship Games 5.000 metres (Moscow)
- 1986 Men's European Championships 5.000 metres (Stuttgart)
- 1987 Men's World Championships 5.000 metres (Rome)
