= Athletics at the 1984 Summer Olympics – Men's 10,000 metres =

Men's 10,000 metres at the Games of the XXIII Olympiad
- Venue: Los Angeles Memorial Coliseum
- Dates: 3 August 1984 (heats); 6 August 1984 (final)
- Competitors: 45 from 34 nations
- Winning time: 27:47.54

Medalists
1st place, gold medalist(s)		Alberto Cova; Italy
2nd place, silver medalist(s)		Mike McLeod; Great Britain
3rd place, bronze medalist(s)		Michael Musyoki; Kenya

These are the official results of the Men's 10,000 metres event at the 1984 Summer Olympics in Los Angeles, California. There were a total number of 41 participating athletes. The event took place between 3 and 6 August. The winning margin was 18.68 seconds.

== Abbreviations ==
Q	automatic qualification
q	qualification by rank
DNS	did not start
NM	no mark
OR	olympic record
WR	world record
AR	area record
NR	national record
PB	personal best
SB	season best

== Records ==
These were the standing world and Olympic records (in minutes) prior to the 1984 Summer Olympics.

World record	27:13.81	(Portugal) Fernando Mamede	Stockholm (SWE)	July 2, 1984
Olympic record	27:38.35	(Finland) Lasse Virén	Munich (FRG)	September 3, 1972

== Final ==
For the first 5,400 metres, this 10,000-metre final was run at a mostly slow and tactical pace. Tanzania's Zakariah Barie led at 1,000 metres in about 2:53.0. Sudan's Musa Jouda led the 18-man field through 2,000 metres (5:47.7), 3,000 metres (about 8:39), and 4,000 metres (11:32.51). Then Ireland's John Treacy took over, running the fifth kilometre about five seconds faster than the fourth kilometre. He passed 5,000 metres in 14:19.83. Over 100 metres later, Portugal's talented but nervously fragile Fernando Mamede dropped out. After 5,400 metres, Britain's Nick Rose suddenly surged past Treacy, accelerating into a 10-metre lead in a matter of seconds. On the next home straight, Italy's Alberto Cova and Finland's Martti Vainio began to pursue Rose. They caught and passed this British veteran runner after 5,700 metres, and quickly left him behind. Vainio led Cova through 6,000 metres (17:00.25), 7,000 metres (19:41.1), 8,000 metres (22:25.0), and 9,000 metres (25:11.0). Although he surged after 9,000 metres, he was unable to drop Cova from contention. At 9,600 metres, Vainio's informal time was 26:48.64. On the final bend, Cova easily sprinted past the tall Finn, who could no longer accelerate his pace. Despite slowing down in the last metres, Cova defeated Vainio by 3.56 seconds, clocking 27:47.54. Britain's Michael McLeod took the original bronze medal with an impressive final kick, crossing the finish line in 28:06.22. Kenya's Mike Musyoki narrowly beat Italy's Salvatore Antibo. West Germany's Christoph Herle and Kenya's Sosthenes Bitok had to settle for the chasing group's minor places. Ironically, Bitok defeated the next runner, Japan's Yutaka Kanai, by 18 seconds, while only 7.5 seconds separated Kanai from the second-last runner, the United States' Pat Porter. The last runner to complete the race, Japan's Masanari Shintaku, finished over 20 seconds behind Porter. (YouTube — tommytempo1 (up to three videos on the race); an Italian-language video on the last 500 metres of the race (Grandi vittori)) - YouTube; The Big Olympic Book / Suuri olympiakirja, Helsinki, Finland, 1984 (Juoksija-lehti / The Runner Magazine); The Big Olympic Work / Suuri olympiateos, Helsinki, Finland, 1984.)

RANK	FINAL	TIME
	Alberto Cova (ITA)	27:47.54
	Mike McLeod (GBR)	28:06.22
	Michael Musyoki (KEN)	28:06.46
4.	Salvatore Antibo (ITA)	28:06.50
5.	Christoph Herle (FRG)	28:08.21
6.	Sostenes Bitok (KEN)	28:09.01
7.	Yutaka Kanai (JPN)	28:27.06
8.	Steve Jones (GBR)	28:28.08
9.	John Treacy (IRL)	28:28.68
10.	Ahmed Musa Jouda (SUD)	28:29.43
11.	Zephaniah Ncube (ZIM)	28:31.61
12.	Nick Rose (GBR)	28:31.73
13.	Zakariah Barie (TAN)	28:32.28
14.	Joseph Nzau (KEN)	28:32.57
15.	Pat Porter (USA)	28:34.59
16.	Masanari Shintaku (JPN)	28:55.54
—	Fernando Mamede (POR)	DNF
DSQ	Martti Vainio (FIN)	27:51.10

Martti Vainio was disqualified after testing positive for performance-enhancing drugs.

== Heats ==
=== Heat 1 ===
RANK	HEAT 1	TIME
1.	Fernando Mamede (POR)	28:21.87
2.	Salvatore Antibo (ITA)	28:22.57
3.	Michael Musyoki (KEN)	28:24.24
4.	Masanari Shintaku (JPN)	28:24.30
5.	Mike McLeod (GBR)	28:24.92
6.	José Gómez (MEX)	28:28.50
7.	Omar Aguilar (CHI)	28:29.06
8.	Paul Williams (CAN)	28:36.15
9.	Craig Virgin (USA)	28:37.58
10.	José João da Silva (BRA)	29:10.52
11.	Luis Tipán (ECU)	30:07.49
12.	Ibrahim Juma (TAN)	30:29.50
13.	Basil Kilani (JOR)	30:43.54
	Ramón López (PAR)	DNF
	Ruddy Cornielle (DOM)	DNF

=== Heat 2 ===
RANK	HEAT 2	TIME
1.	Alberto Cova (ITA)	28:26.10
2.	Zephaniah Ncube (ZIM)	28:28.53
3.	Joseph Nzau (KEN)	28:28.71
4.	Christoph Herle (FRG)	28:30.28
5.	Nick Rose (GBR)	28:31.13
6.	Gidamis Shahanga (TAN)	28:42.92
7.	Antonio Prieto (ESP)	28:57.78
8.	Martín Pitayo (MEX)	28:59.19
9.	Paul Cummings (USA)	29:09.82
10.	Arie Gamliel (ISR)	29:31.32
11.	Mohiddin Mohamed Kulmiye (SOM)	29:37.93
12.	Matthews Kambale (MAW)	30:47.73
13.	Orlando Mora (CRC)	30:49.43
14.	Tau Tokwepota (PNG)	31:29.14
	Ali Al-Ghadi (YAR)	DNF

=== Heat 3 ===
RANK	HEAT 3	TIME
1.	Sostenes Bitok (KEN)	28:12.17
2.	Yutaka Kanai (JPN)	28:14.67
3.	Zakariah Barie (TAN)	28:15.18
4.	Steve Jones (GBR)	28:15.22
5.	John Treacy (IRL)	28:18.13
6.	Martti Vainio (FIN)	28:19.25
7.	Pat Porter (USA)	28:19.94
8.	Musa Gouda (SUD)	28:20.26
9.	Francesco Panetta (ITA)	29:00.78
10.	Marios Kassianidis (CYP)	29:06.08
11.	Domingo Tibaduiza (COL)	29:07.19
12.	Julio Gómez (ARG)	29:58.06
13.	Frans Ntaole (LES)	30:18.71
14.	Albert Marie (SEY)	32:04.11
	Necdet Ayaz (TUR)	DNF

== See also ==
- 1980 Men's Olympic Games 10,000 metres (Moscow)
- 1982 Men's European Championships 10,000 metres (Athens)
- 1983 Men's World Championships 10,000 metres (Helsinki)
- 1984 Men's Friendship Games 10,000 metres (Moscow)
- 1986 Men's European Championships 10,000 metres (Stuttgart)
- 1987 Men's World Championships 10,000 metres (Rome)
- 1988 Men's Olympic Games 10,000 metres (Seoul)
