= Yemen at the Olympics =

- IOC code: YEM
- NOC: Yemen Olympic Committee
- Website: www.nocyemen.org (in Arabic and English)
- Medals: Gold 0 Silver 0 Bronze 0 Total 0

Summer appearances
- 1992; 1996; 2000; 2004; 2008; 2012; 2016; 2020; 2024

Other related appearances
- North Yemen (1984–1988); South Yemen (1988)

Yemen has competed at the Summer Olympic Games since its first participation in 1992. Before the Yemeni unification in 1990, Yemenite athletes had competed at the Games as early as 1984, representing North Yemen (the Yemen Arab Republic; 1984 and 1988) or South Yemen (People's Democratic Republic of Yemen; 1988). Yemen has not yet won any Olympic medal. The nation has never participated in any Winter Olympic Games.

The Yemen Olympic Committee was formed in 1971 and recognized by the International Olympic Committee in 1981.

Recently, Yemen Olympic Committee requested to join both the Refugee Olympic Team and the Refugee Paralympic Team following the outbreak of the Yemeni Civil War since 2014 and appealed host NOCs like Egypt, Greece, Turkey to provide various trainings to Yemeni athletes outside Yemen.

== Timeline of participation ==
Olympic Year/s	Team(s)	
1984	North Yemen	
1988	North Yemen	South Yemen
1992–present	Yemen	

== Medal tables ==
=== Medals by Summer Games ===
Games	Athletes	Gold	Silver	Bronze	Total	Rank
1984 Los Angeles	as North Yemen					
1988 Seoul	as North Yemen and South Yemen					
1992 Barcelona	8	0	0	0	0	–
1996 Atlanta	4	0	0	0	0	–
2000 Sydney	2	0	0	0	0	–
2004 Athens	3	0	0	0	0	–
2008 Beijing	5	0	0	0	0	–
2012 London	4	0	0	0	0	–
2016 Rio de Janeiro	3	0	0	0	0	–
2020 Tokyo	5	0	0	0	0	–
2024 Paris	4	0	0	0	0	–
2028 Los Angeles	future event					
2032 Brisbane	future event					
Total		0	0	0	0	–

== See also ==
- Yemen at the Paralympics
- List of flag bearers for Yemen at the Olympics
