= Charles Cheruiyot =

Charles Cheruiyot may refer to:

- Charles Cheruiyot (born 1964), Kenyan long-distance runner
- Charles Cheruiyot (born 1988), Kenyan long-distance runner
- Charles Cheruiyot Keter, Kenyan politician
