= Espinho, Portugal =

Espinho
- Municipality
- City of Espinho
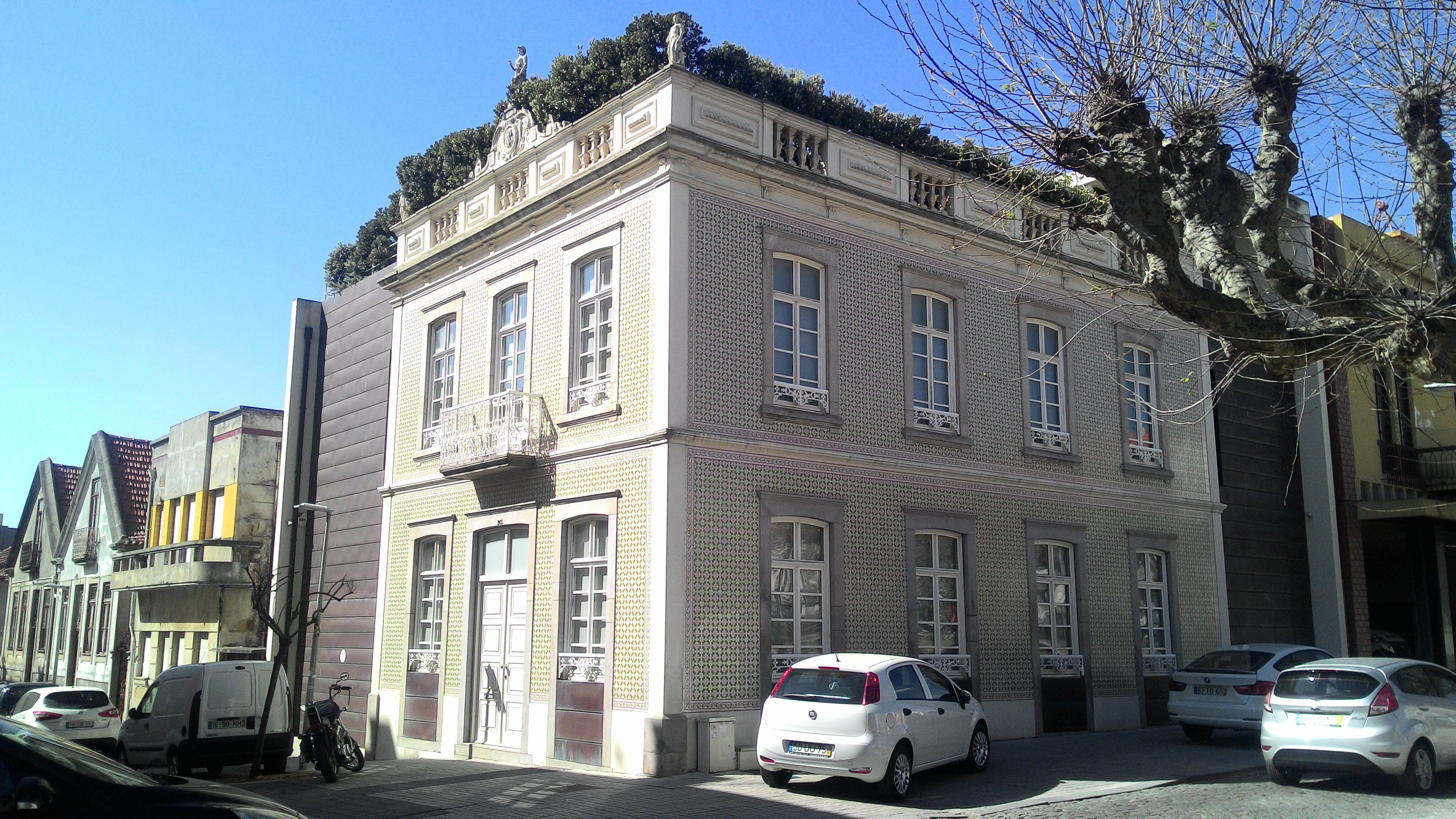
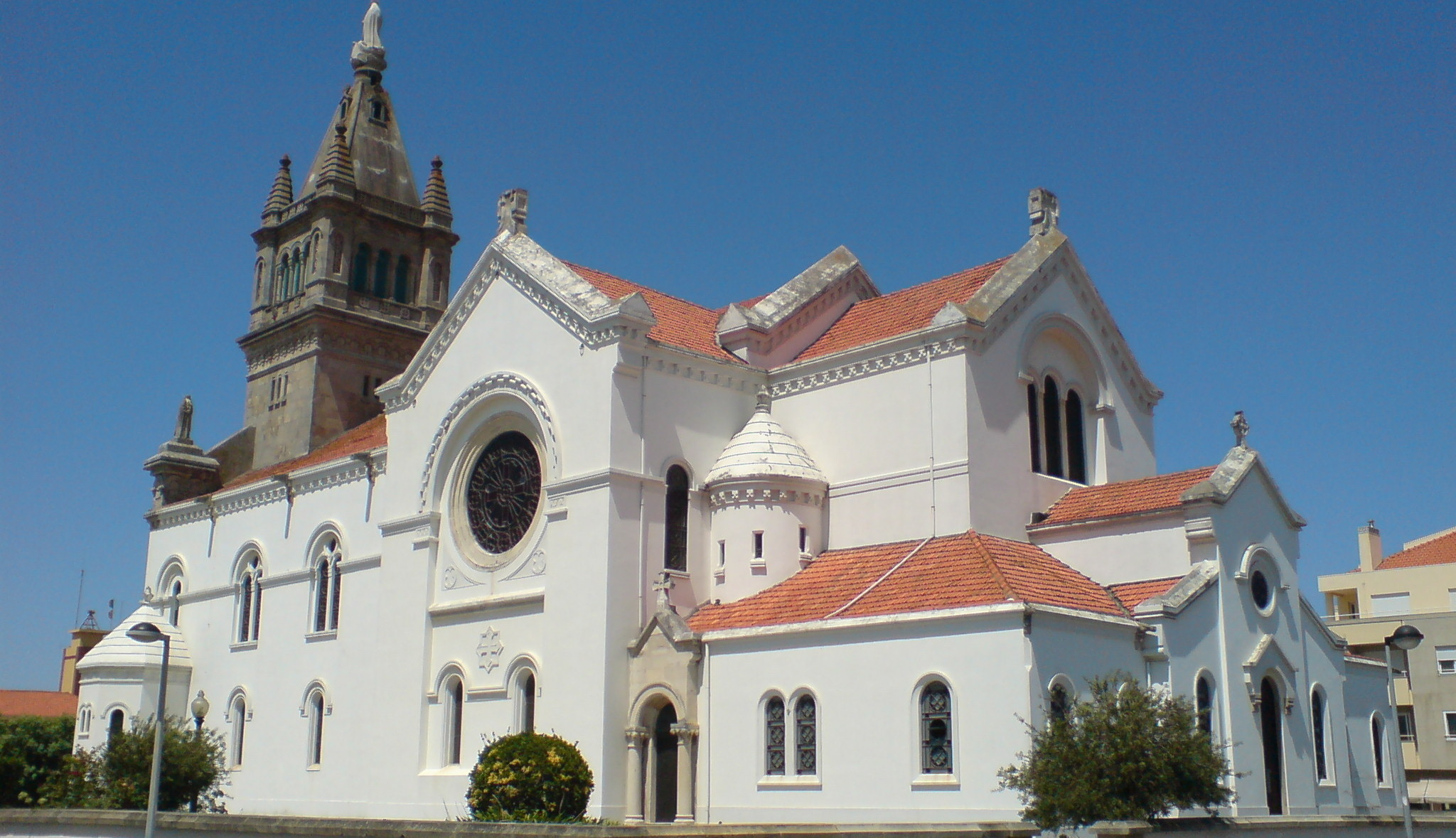
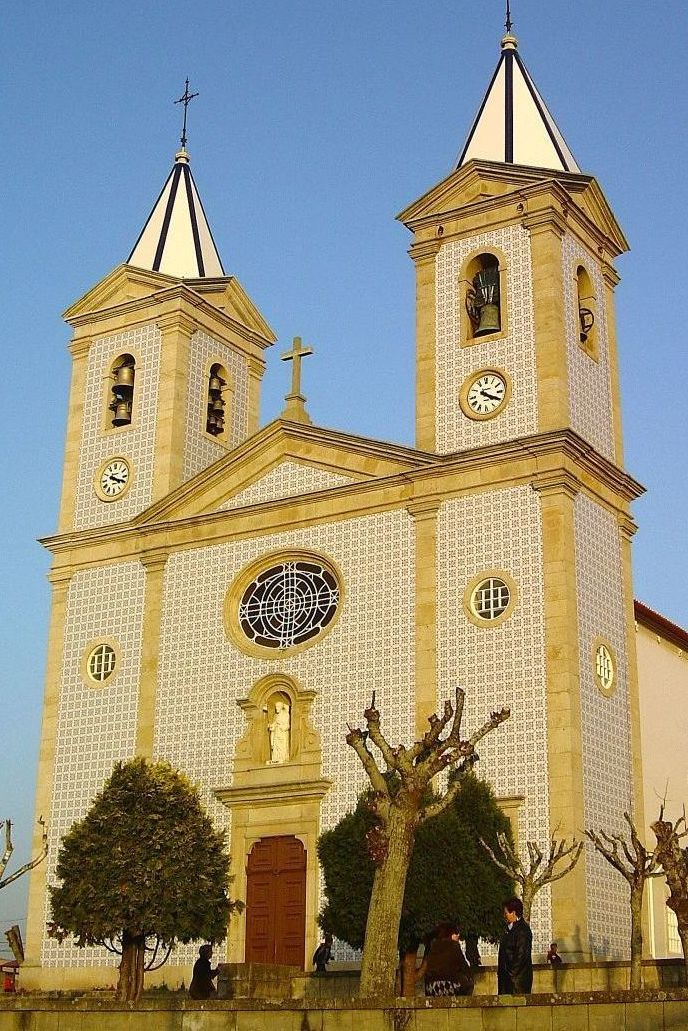
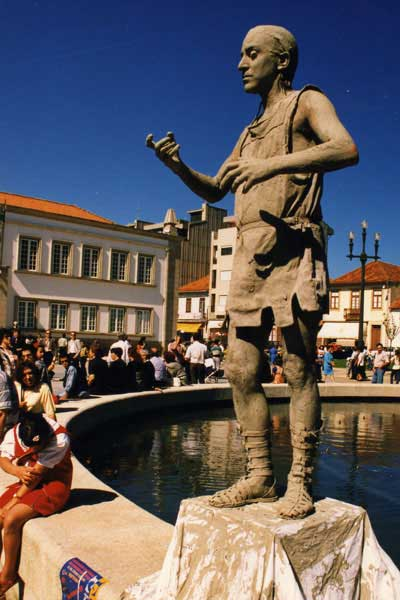
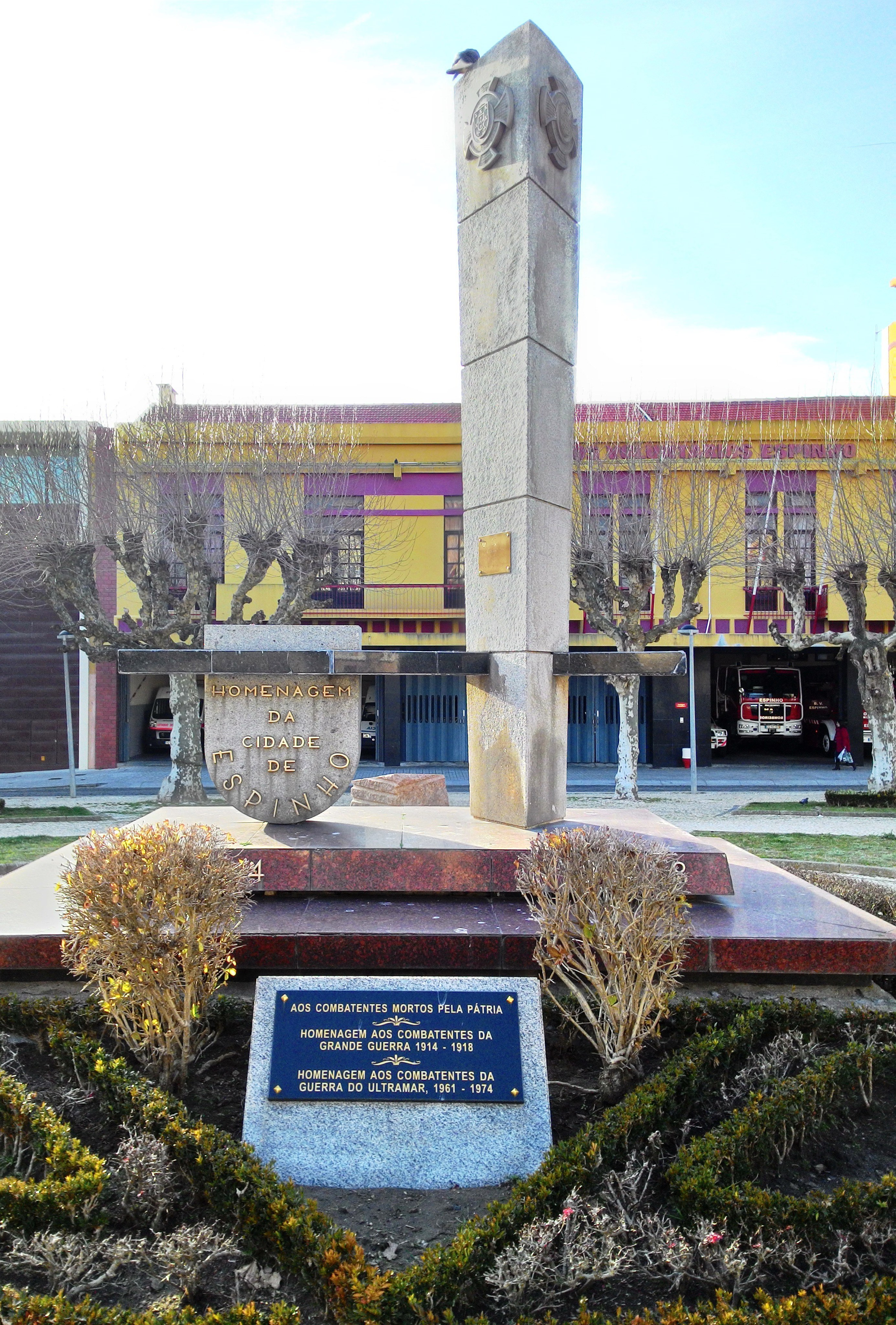
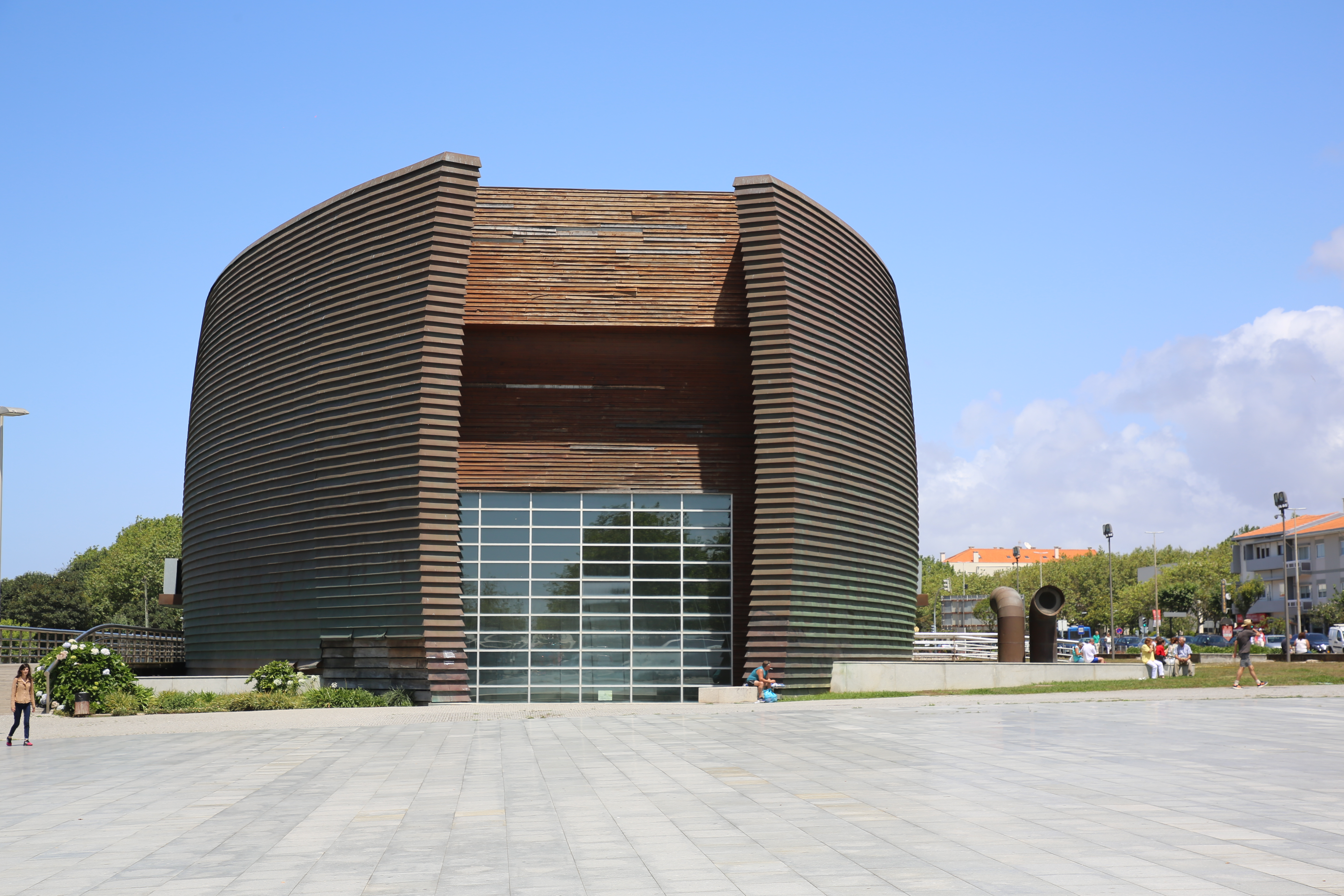
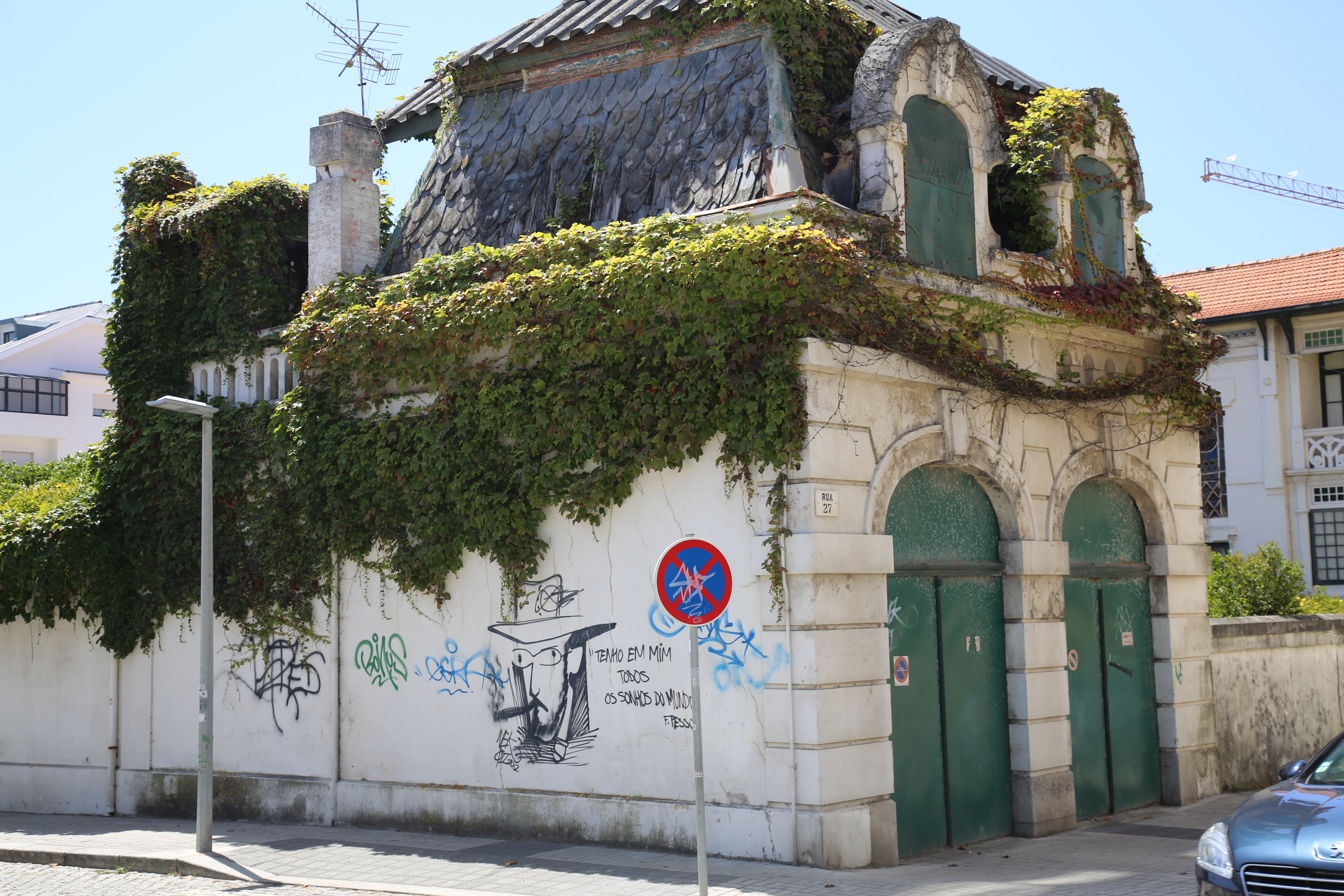

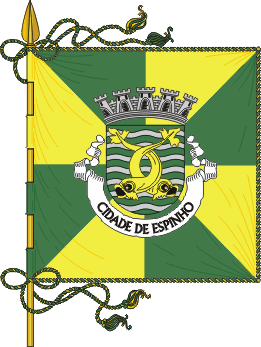
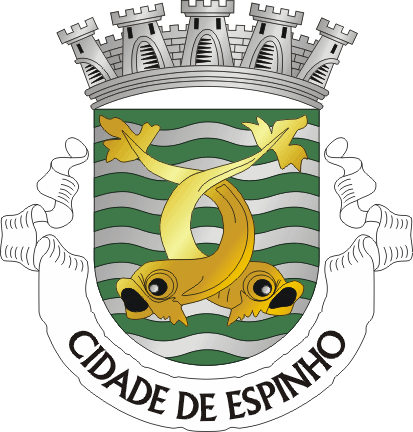
- Flag Coat of arms
- Interactive map of Espinho
- Location in Portugal
- Coordinates: 41°00′N 8°38′W
- Country: Portugal
- Region: Norte
- Metropolitan area: Porto
- District: Aveiro
- Parishes: 4

Government
  - President: Maria Manuel Cruz (PS)

Area
  - Total: 21.06 km^{2} (8.13 sq mi)

Population (2021)
  - Total: 31,702
  - Density: 1,505/km^{2} (3,899/sq mi)
- Time zone: UTC+00:00 (WET)
  - Summer (DST): UTC+01:00 (WEST)
- Website: https://portal.cm-espinho.pt/pt/ and https://www.visit.espinho.pt/en/

Espinho (Portuguese pronunciation: [ɨʃˈpiɲu]), officially the City of Espinho (Portuguese: Cidade de Espinho), is a city and a municipality located in the Aveiro District, Portugal. It is located in both the Greater Porto and the Metropolitan Area of Porto, 16 km from its city centre. It is one of the smallest municipalities in Portugal and was, until 1899, part of the Santa Maria da Feira Municipality.

In 2021, Espinho had a population of 31,027, a slight decrease from the previous census in 2011, when 31,786 were registered, in an area of 21.06 km^{2}.

The current mayor is Jorge Ratola, elected by the PSD.

It is a beach resort and a zone of legal gambling with a casino - Casino Solverde. Its fair - Feira de Espinho, having been first organised in 1894, is well known in Portugal. The city is home to CINANIMA - Festival Internacional de Cinema de Animação, an international animation festival, and FEST - New Directors New Films Festival, an international film festival. The municipal holiday is June 16.

== Sport ==
Volleyball

The city, known as the volleyball capital in Portugal, is the home of nine Portuguese sports clubs: Novasemente/Cavalinho, Sporting Clube de Silvalde, Associação Desportiva de Anta, Clube de Voleibol de Espinho, Sporting Clube de Espinho, Associação Académica de Espinho, Academia de Ténis de Espinho, Clube de Ténis de Espinho and Associação Desportiva Rio Largo.

Sporting Clube de Espinho and Associação Académica de Espinho are regular presences in the Portuguese Volleyball First Division. The first one is the Portuguese team with more titles (including a CEV Cup, formerly known as CEV Top Teams Cup) and the second one was once national champion.

Football

Sporting Clube de Espinho (Os Tigres da Costa Verde) plays in Campeonato Nacional de Seniores, the third football championship in Portugal.

Former Portugal national football team player Fernando Couto, coach Vítor Pereira, the Olympic medalist António Leitão and volleyball players, such as Miguel Maia and João Brenha, were born in Espinho.

Beach Volleyball

The city hosted the 2017 FIVB Beach Volleyball World Tour, between 28 and 30 July. Espinho also hosted the FIVB Beach Volleyball World Tour in 2019, between the 16th and 21 July.

Beach Soccer

The city hosted the 2015 FIFA Beach Soccer World Cup, between the 9th and 19 July.

Surf

Surf event Espinho Surf Destination is an annual event held in Espinho, organized by the World Surf League.

Golf

The oldest golf club in Portugal and Spain, Oporto Golf Club, is also located in Espinho.

== Gallery ==
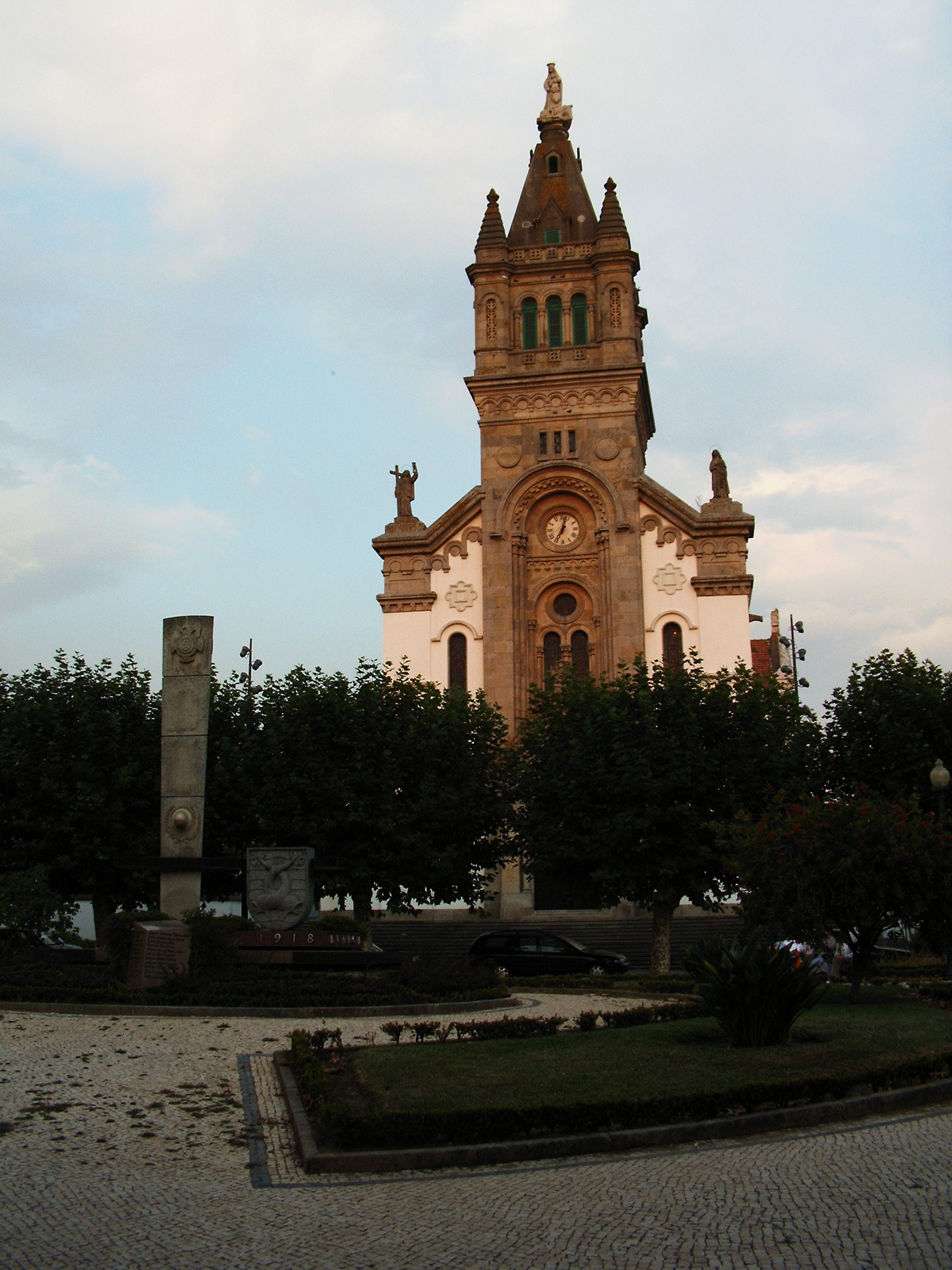
Main Church in Espinho

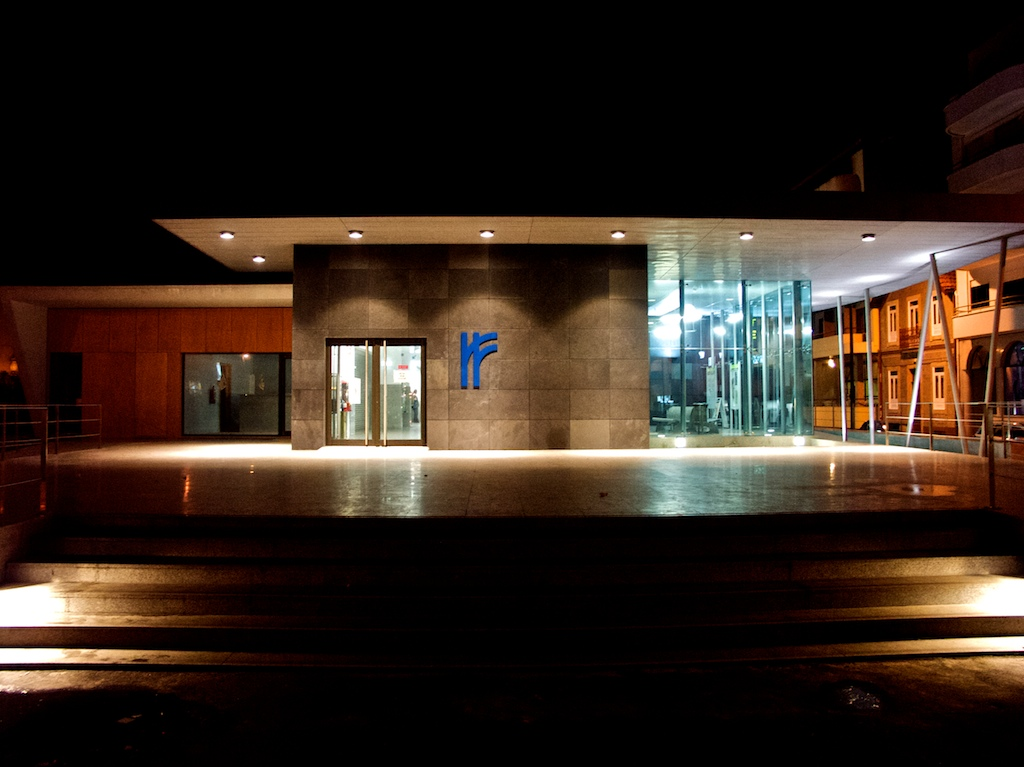
Train station

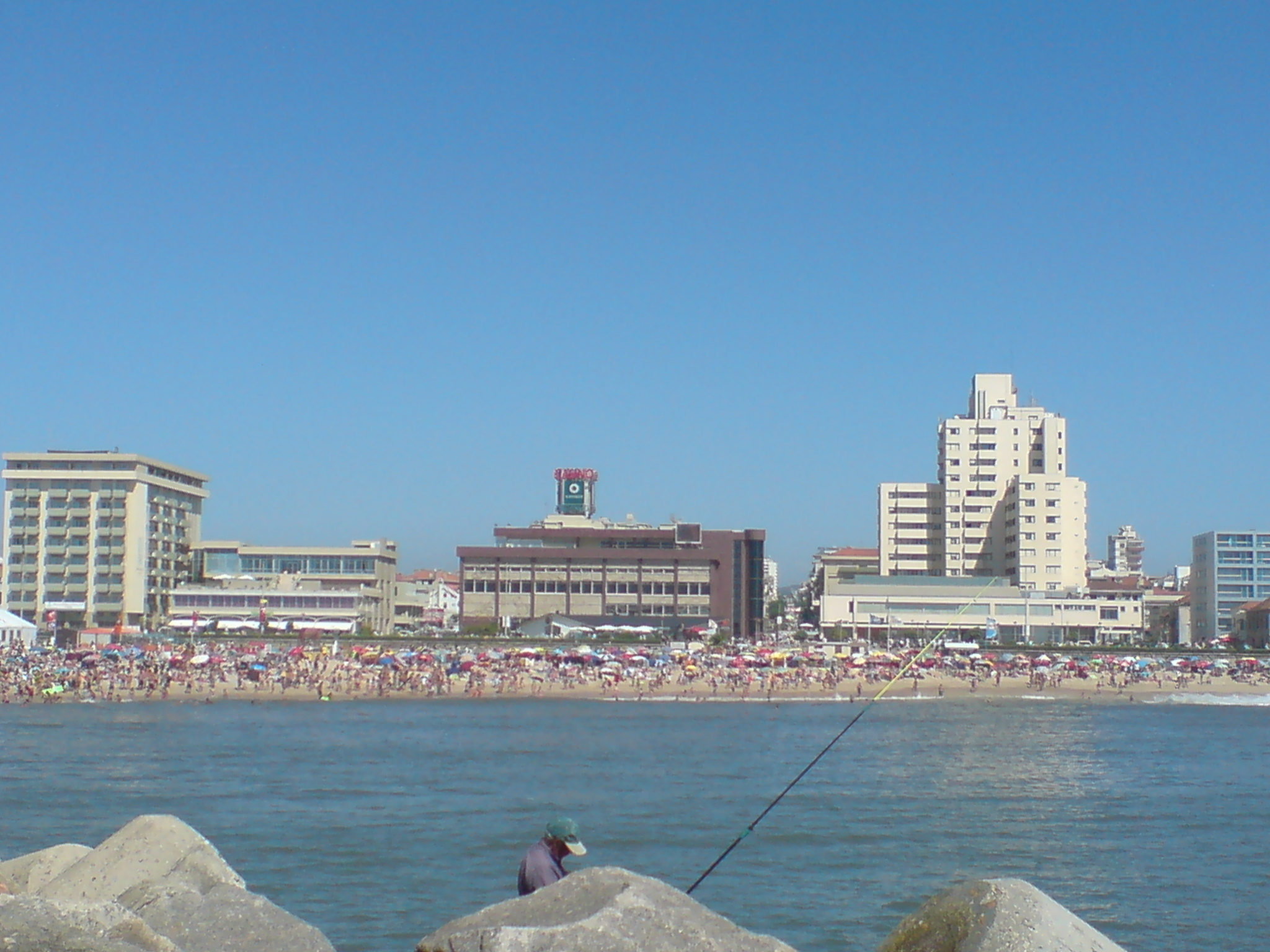
Espinho's seafront

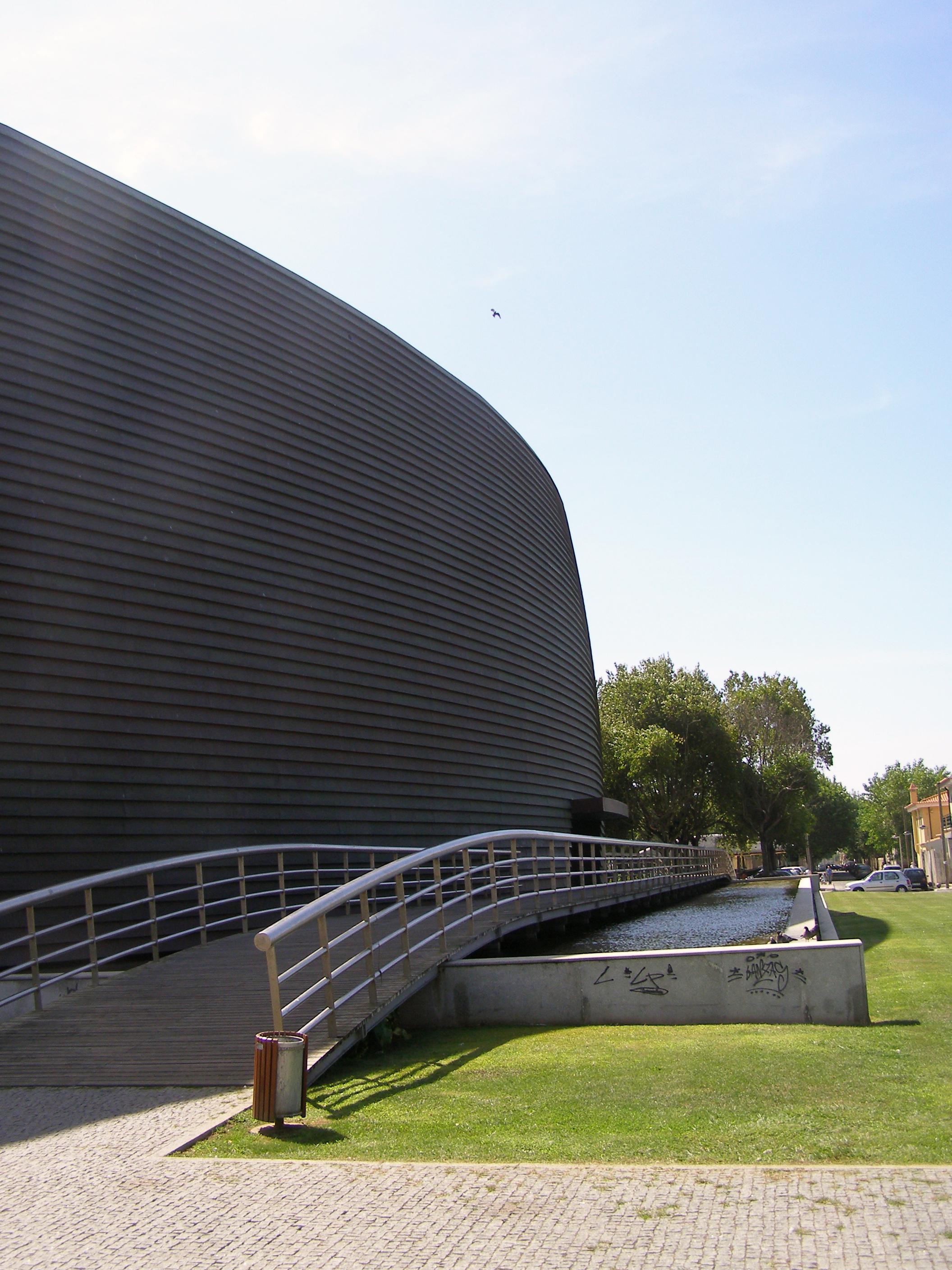
Major pavilion in Espinho

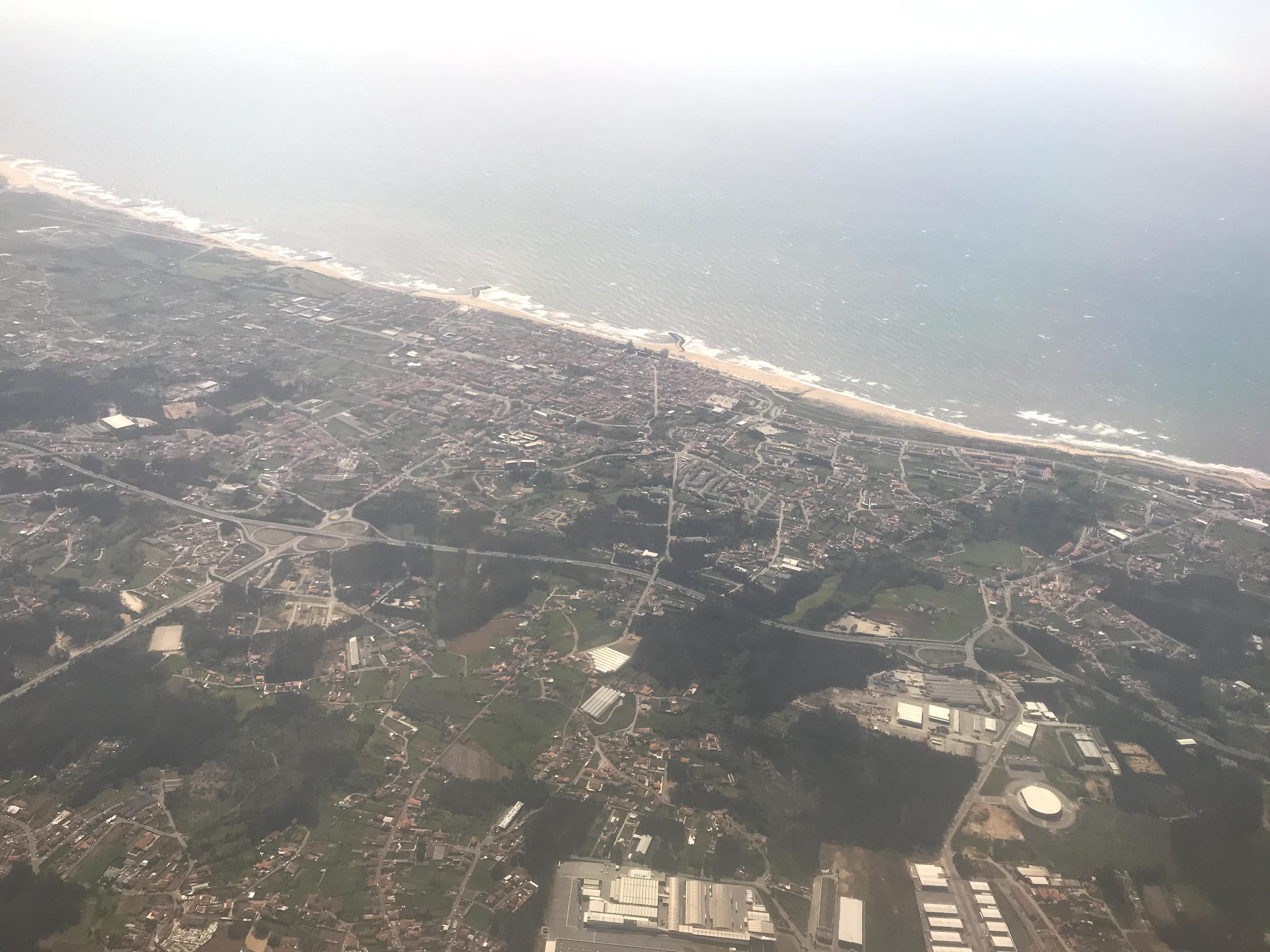
Aerial view of Espinho

== Demographics ==
Historical population

Year	Pop.	±%
1864	5,107	—
1878	5,983	+17.2%
1890	7,336	+22.6%
1900	9,383	+27.9%
1911	12,040	+28.3%
1920	13,045	+8.3%
1930	15,336	+17.6%
1940	17,284	+12.7%

Year	Pop.	±%
1950	20,227	+17.0%
1960	23,084	+14.1%
1970	29,008	+25.7%
1981	32,409	+11.7%
1991	34,956	+7.9%
2001	33,701	−3.6%
2011	31,786	−5.7%
2021	31,043	−2.3%

Source: INE

Espinho is also home to a significant Madeiran immigrant community.

== Parishes ==
Administratively, the municipality is divided into 4 civil parishes (freguesias):

- Anta e Guetim
- Espinho
- Paramos
- Silvalde

== Cities and towns ==
- Espinho (city)
- Silvalde (town)
- Anta (town)
- Paramos (town)
- Guetim (town)
- Esmojães (town)

== Notable people ==
=== Politics ===
- Luís Montenegro (born in Porto, 1973, but raised in and a known citizen of Espinho), Prime Minister of Portugal (since April 2024).
- Carlos Guimarães Pinto (born in Espinho, 1983), economist, leader of the Liberal Initiative party (2018–2019).

=== Sport ===
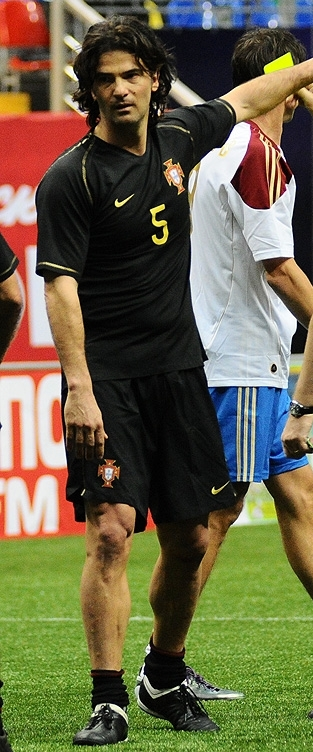
Fernando Couto, 2011

- António Jesus (1955–2010), known as Jesus, was a football goalkeeper with 383 club caps and 7 for Portugal
- António Leitão (1960–2012) a long-distance athlete; bronze medallist in the men's 5000 metres at the 1984 Summer Olympics
- Jaime Alves (1965–2020), known as Alves, was a footballer with 271 club caps and 3 for Portugal
- Vítor Pereira (born 1968) a football player and later manager who managed teams like Porto, Olympiacos and Fenerbahçe
- Fernando Couto (born 1969) a footballer with 438 club caps and 110 for Portugal
- Filipe Gonçalves (born 1984) a footballer with over 420 club caps
- João Carlos Dias Correia (born 1985) known as Carlitos, a footballer with almost 400 club caps
- Fábio Espinho (born 1985) known as Espinho, is a footballer with over 400 club caps
