= Alphonce =

Alphonce is a given name. Notable people with the given name include:

- Alphonce Omija (born 2002), Kenyan professional footballer
- Alphonce Simbu (born 1992), Tanzanian long-distance runner
- Alphonce Swai (born 1962), Tanzanian long-distance runner
- Alphonce Kasesi (born 1991), Kenyan Politician and academician.

== See also ==
- Alphonse (given name)
