= Julio Gómez (Argentine runner) =

Argentine long-distance runner

Personal information
- Full name: Julio César Gómez
- Nationality: Argentine
- Born: 27 January 1963 (age 62)
- Height: 1.82 m (6 ft 0 in)
- Weight: 63 kg (139 lb)

Sport
- Sport: Long-distance running
- Event: 5000 metres

Julio César Gómez (born 27 January 1963) is an Argentine long-distance runner. He competed in the men's 5000 metres at the 1984 Summer Olympics.

== International competitions ==
Year	Competition	Venue	Position	Event	Notes
Representing Argentina
1983	South American Championships	Santa Fe, Argentina	5th	5000 m	14:17.9
1984	Olympic Games	Los Angeles, United States	42nd (h)	5000 m	14:28.48
1984	Olympic Games	Los Angeles, United States	33rd (h)	10,000 m	29:58.06

== Personal bests ==
Outdoor

- 5000 metres – 13:54.3 (1987)
- 10,000 metres – 29:12.9 (1984)
