= Israel at the 1984 Summer Olympics =

- IOC code: ISR
- NOC: Olympic Committee of Israel

in Los Angeles
- Competitors: 32 (24 men and 8 women) in 11 sports
- Flag bearer: Zehava Shmueli
- Medals: Gold 0 Silver 0 Bronze 0 Total 0

Summer Olympics appearances (overview)
- 1952; 1956; 1960; 1964; 1968; 1972; 1976; 1980; 1984; 1988; 1992; 1996; 2000; 2004; 2008; 2012; 2016; 2020; 2024

Israel competed at the 1984 Summer Olympics in Los Angeles, United States. The nation returned to the Summer Games after participating in the American-led boycott of the 1980 Summer Olympics. 32 competitors, 24 men and 8 women, took part in 46 events in 11 sports.

== Results by event ==
=== Athletics ===
Event	Participant	Result	Ref
Men's 400 metres	Mark Handelsman	Heat — 48.17 (→ did not advance)	
Men's 800 metres	Mark Handelsman	Heat — 1:47.90 (→ did not advance)	
Men's 1500 metres	Mark Handelsman	Heat — 3: 45.05 (→ did not advance)	
Men's 5000 metres	Arie Gamliel	Heat — 14:02.98 (→ did not advance)	
Men's 10000 metres	Arie Gamliel	Heat — 29:31.32 (→ did not advance)	
Men's 3000 metres steeplechase	Yehuda Zadok	Heat — 8:42.28 (→ did not advance)	
Men's marathon	Shem-Tov Sabag	— 2:31:34 (→ 60th place)	
Women's 100 metres	Maya Ben-Tzur	First Heat — 12.30s (→ did not advance)	
Women's marathon	Zehava Shmueli	Final — 2:42:27 (→ 30th place)	
Women's long jump	Maya Ben-Tzur	Qualification — 6.07 m (→ did not advance, 16th place)	

=== Boxing ===
Event	Participant	Round	Result	Ref
Men's Light Flyweight (– 48kg)	Yehuda Ben Haim	First Round	Defeated Michael Ebo Danquah (GHA), 4:1	
Men's Light Flyweight (– 48kg)	Yehuda Ben Haim	Second Round; 9th (tied)	Lost to John Lyon (GBR), 0:5	
Men's Lightweight (– 60kg)	Shlomo Niazov	First Round	Lost to Dar Kamran (PAK), 0:5	

=== Canoeing ===
Event	Participant	Round	Result	Ref
Men's K-1 500 metres	Aviram Mizrahi	Heats	2nd place, 1:53.66	
Men's K-1 500 metres	Aviram Mizrahi	Semifinals	4th place, 1:49.98 (did not advance)	

=== Fencing ===
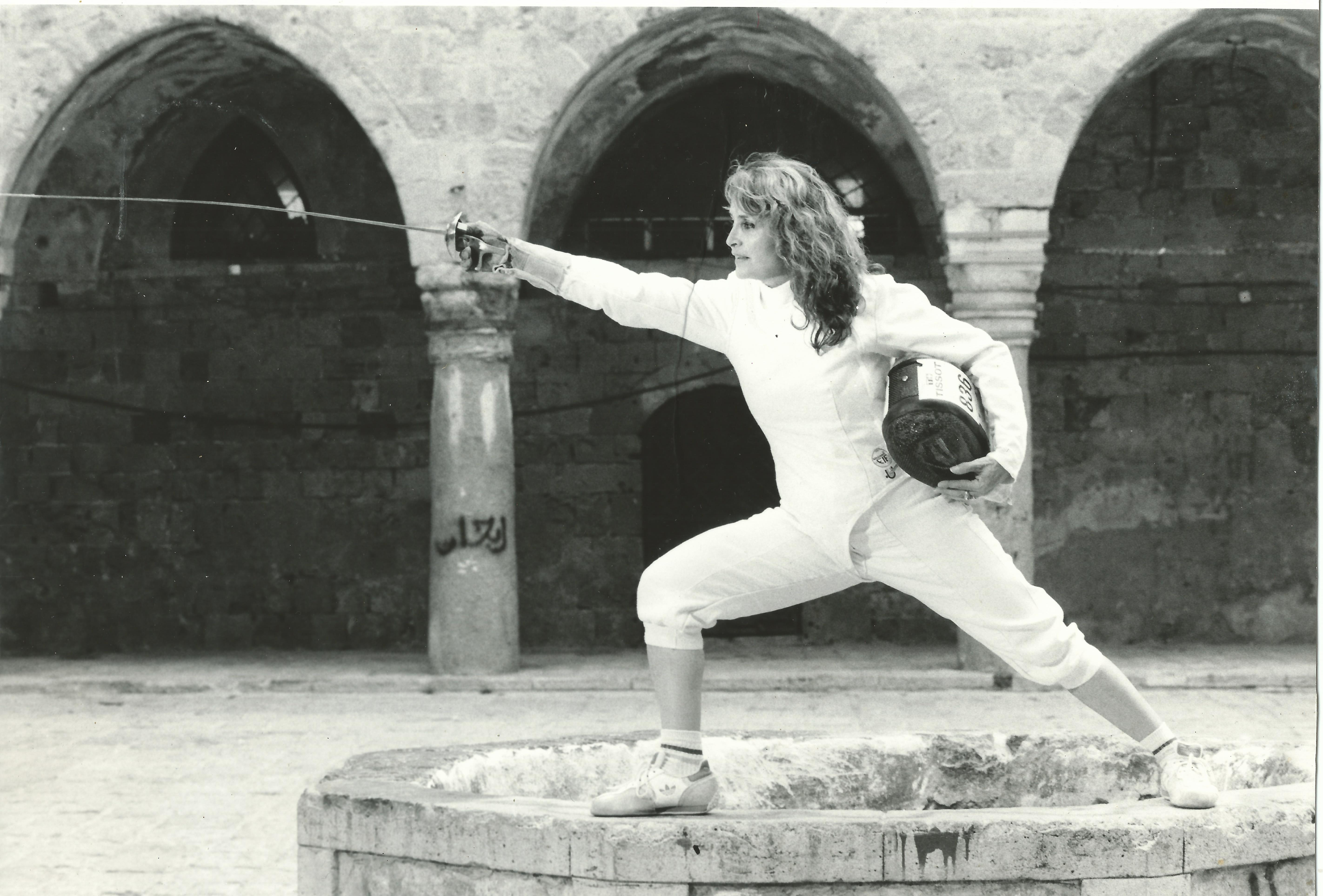
Lydia Hatuel

Event	Participant	Result	Ref
Men's foil	Yitzhak Hatuel	16th	
Men's foil	Shlomi Eyal	19th	
Women's foil	Nili Drori	17th	
Women's foil	Lydia Hatuel-Zuckerman	26th	

=== Gymnastics ===
Event	Participant	Result	Ref
	Yohanan Moyal	67th	
	Ya'akov Levi		
	Nancy Goldsmith	31st	
	Limor Friedman		
	Liat Haninowitz		

=== Judo ===
Event	Participant	Result	Ref
Men's -60 kg	Eddy Koaz	10th (tied)	
Men's -78 kg	Moshe Ponte	20th (tied)	

=== Sailing ===
Event	Participant	Result	Ref
Flying Dutchman	Yoel Sela and Eldad Amir	8th	
470	Shimshon Brokman and Eitan Friedlander	8th	
Windglider	Yehuda Atedji	14th	

=== Shooting ===
Event	Participant	Result	Ref
Men's Free Pistol, 50 metres	Gary Aramist	36th (tied)	
Men's Small-Bore Rifle, Prone, 50 metres; Men's Small-Bore Rifle, Three Positions, 50 metres; Men's Air Rifle, 10 metres	Yair Davidovitz	23rd; 46th; DNF	
Men's Air Rifle, 10 metres; Men's Small-Bore Rifle, Three Positions, 50 metres	Itzhak Yonassi	8th; 39th (tied)	

=== Swimming ===
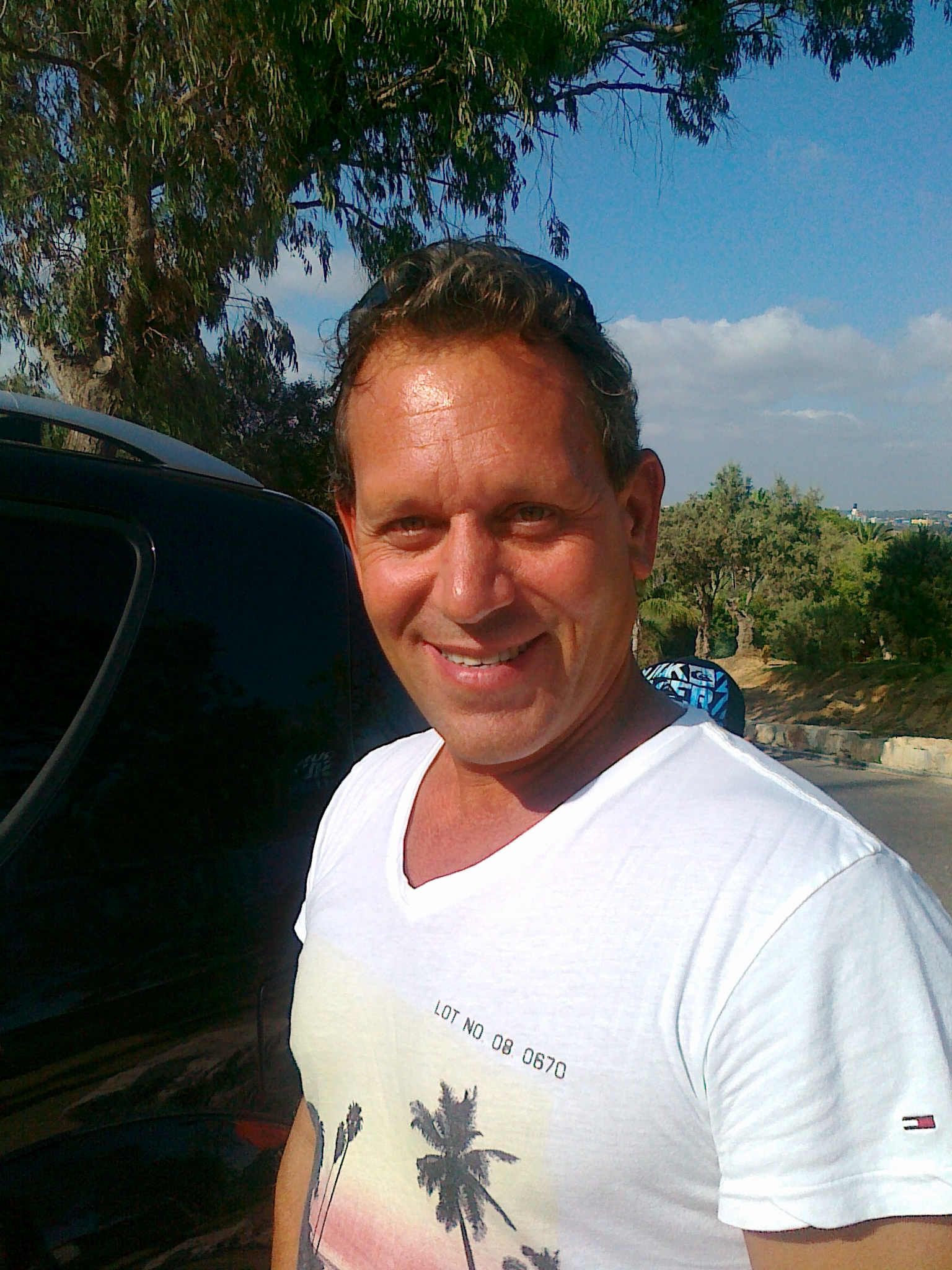
Eyal Stigman

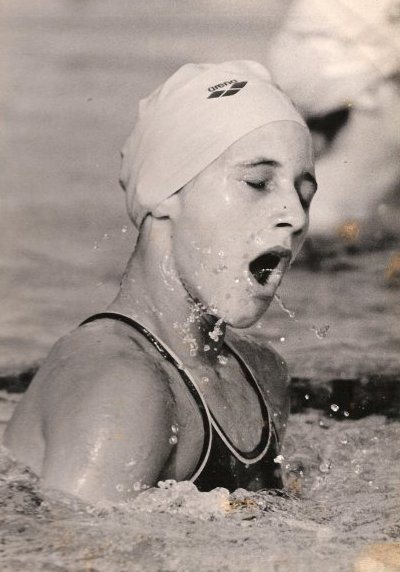
Hadar Rubinstein

Event	Participant	Round	Time	Result	Ref
Men's 100m Breaststroke	Eyal Stigman	Heat	1:05.63	22nd place did not advance	
Men's 200m Breaststroke	Eyal Stigman	Heat	2:24.93	23rd place did not advance	
Men's 200m Butterfly	Yoram Kochavy	Heat	2:04.08	21st place did not advance	
Men's 200m Individual Medley	Yoram Kochavy	Heat	2:11.81	27th place did not advance	
Men's 400m Individual Medley	Yoram Kochavy	Heat	4:35.70	16th place	
Men's 400m Individual Medley	Yoram Kochavy	B-Final	4:40.00	16th place	
Women's 200m Freestyle	Hadar Rubinstein	Heat	2:12.17	26th place did not advance	
Women's 400m Freestyle	Hadar Rubinstein	Heat	4:34.95	21st place did not advance	
Women's 800m Freestyle	Hadar Rubinstein	Heat	DNS	No ranking did not advance	
Women's 200m Butterfly	Hadar Rubinstein	Heat	2:22.78	26th place did not advance	

=== Tennis ===
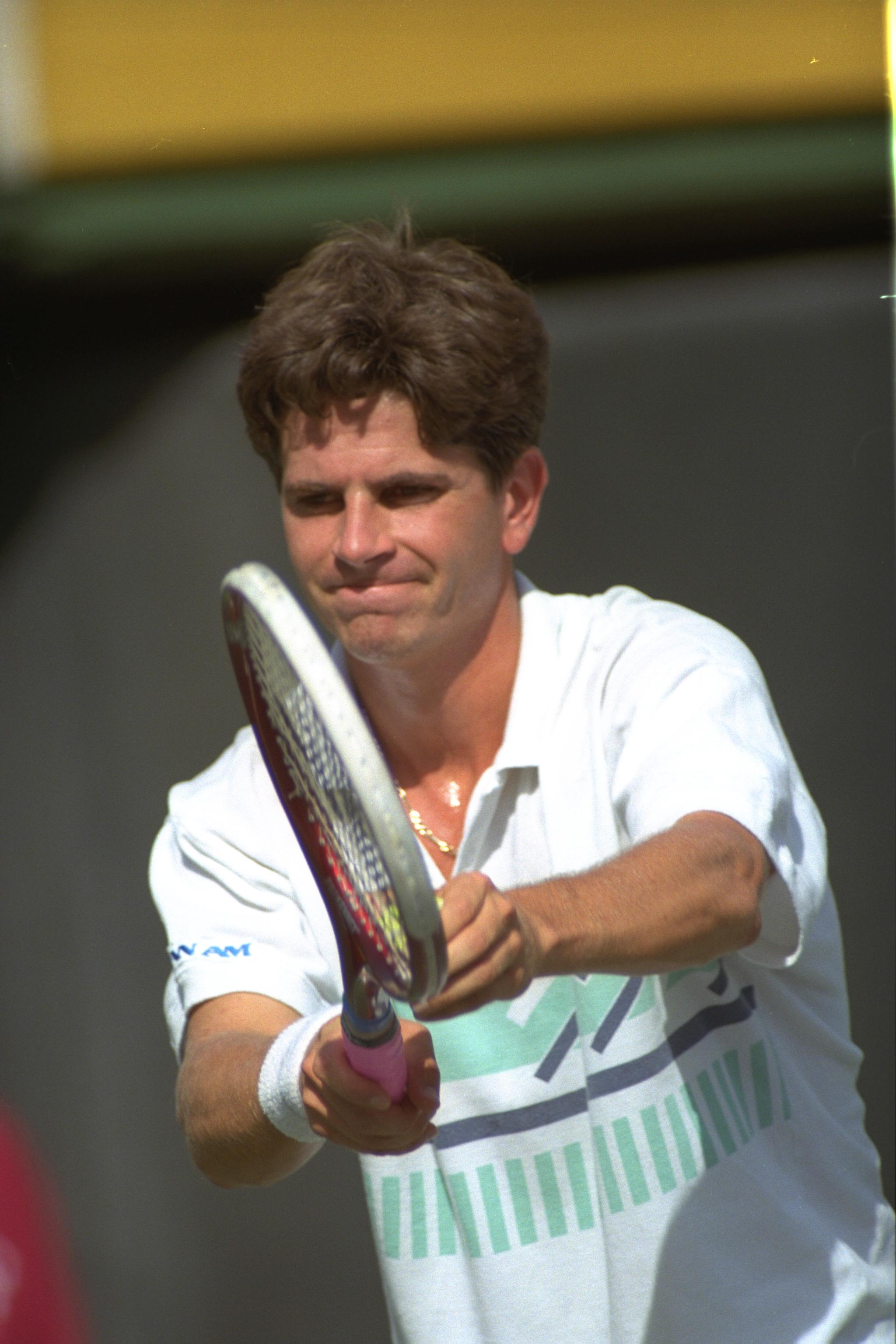
Amos Mansdorf

Event	Participant	Result	Ref
	Amos Mansdorf		

=== Weightlifting ===
Event	Participant	Result	Ref
Men's Flyweight	Meir Daloya	9th	
