= Hadar Rubinstein =

Israeli swimmer

Hadar Rubinstein הדר רובינשטיין
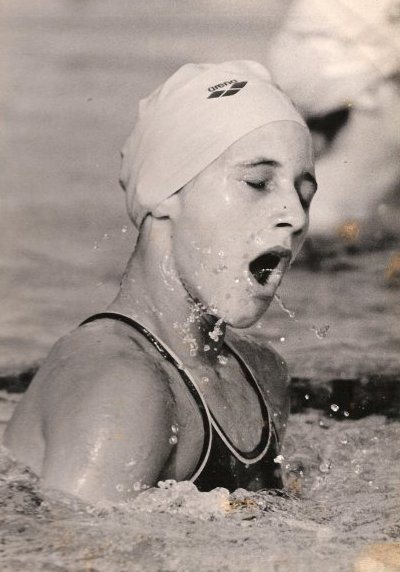

Personal information
- Nationality: Israeli
- Born: April 11, 1967 (age 59) Israel
- Height: 5 ft 2.5 in (158.8 cm)
- Weight: 115 lb (52 kg)

Sport
- Sport: Swimming
- Strokes: 200 m butterfly 200 m and 400 m freestyle

Hadar Rubinstein (Hebrew: הדר רובינשטיין; born April 11, 1967) is an Israeli former Olympic swimmer. She was born in Israel, and is Jewish.

== Swimming career ==
Swimming for Israel at the age of 14 at the 1981 Maccabiah Games, she won gold medals in the women's 100 m butterfly with a time of 1:05.67, and in the women's 200 m butterfly (setting an Israeli record).

When she competed in the Olympics, she was 5 ft 2.5 in (158.8 cm) tall and weighed 115 pounds (52 kg).

She competed for Israel at the 1984 Summer Olympics in Los Angeles, California, in swimming at the age of 17. Swimming in the Women's 400 metre freestyle she came in 21st with a time of 4:34.95, competing in the Women's 200 metre butterfly she came in 26th with a time of 2:22.78, and Swimming in the Women's 200 metre freestyle she came in 26th with a time of 2:12.32.
