= Jaime Alves =

Portuguese footballer (1965–2020)

Personal information
- Full name: Jaime Alves Magalhães
- Date of birth: 28 March 1965
- Place of birth: Espinho, Portugal
- Date of death: 21 September 2020 (aged 55)
- Place of death: Espinho, Portugal
- Height: 1.76 m (5 ft 9 in)
- Position: Midfielder

Youth career
- 1978–1982: Espinho

Senior career*
Years	Team	Apps	(Gls)
1982–1983	Cortegaça		
1983–1985	Espinho	27	(0)
1985–1991	Boavista	135	(17)
1991–1992	Vitória Guimarães	24	(2)
1992–1998	Boavista	85	(7)
Total		271	(26)

International career
1988–1989	Portugal	3	(0)
- * Club domestic league appearances and goals

Jaime Alves Magalhães (28 March 1965 – 21 September 2020), known as Alves, was a Portuguese footballer who played as a midfielder.
