= Arie Gamliel =

Israeli former Olympic runner (born 1957)

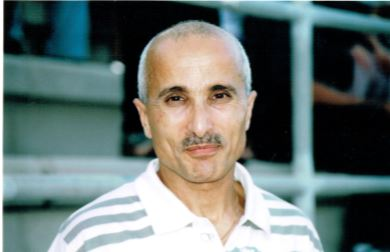
- Arie Gamliel in 2007

Personal information
- Native name: אריה גמליאל
- National team: Israel
- Born: November 21, 1957 (age 68) Israel

Sport
- Sport: Running
- Event(s): 5000 metres; 10000 metres

Achievements and titles
- Personal bests: 5000 metres: 13:43.04 (1984); 10000 metres: 28:42.9 (1984)
Medal record
Maccabiah Games
Silver medal – second place	1981 Israel	5,000 metres

Arie Gamliel (Hebrew: אריה גמליאל; born November 21, 1957) is an Israeli former Olympic runner. He was the Israeli Men's Champion in the 5000 metres in 1987 and 1990, and in the 10000 metres in 1987–90. At the 1981 Maccabiah Games, he won the silver medal in the 5,000 metres.

He was born in Israel and is Jewish.

== Running career ==
Gamliel's personal bests were 13:43.04 in the 5000 metres, and 28:42.9 (an Israeli record) in the 10000 metres, both in 1984. He was the Israeli Men's Champion in the 5000 metres in 1987 and 1990, and in the 10000 metres in 1987–90.

In June 1981, Gamliel set the Israeli 3,000-metre record with a time of 7:55.7. The following month at the 1981 Maccabiah Games, he won the silver medal in the 5,000 metres.

Gamliel competed for Israel at the 1984 Summer Olympics in Los Angeles, California, at the age of 26. In the Men's 5,000 metres he came in 10th in Heat 3 with a time of 14:02.98 (missing qualifying for the final by 12 seconds), and in the Men's 10,000 metres he came in 10th in Heat 2 with a time of 29:31.32. When he competed in the Olympics, he was 5 ft 4.5 in (164 cm) tall and weighed 106 lb (48 kg).

In 1984, Gamliel broke the 10,000-metre record with a time of 28:42.9. In 1988, he ran the London Marathon in a time of 2:23:35.
