= Ali Al-Ghadi =

Yemeni long-distance runner (born 1952)

Personal information
- Nationality: Yemeni
- Born: 10 October 1952 (age 74)

Sport
- Sport: Athletics

Ali Saleh Al-Ghadi (Arabic: علي صالح الغدي; born 10 October 1952) is a Yemeni former long-distance runner. Alongside his brother, he competed for North Yemen at the 1984 Summer Olympics in their debut appearance. Al-Ghadi competed in the men's 5000 metres and the men's 10,000 metres though failed to advance past the preliminary heats of both events.

== Biography ==
Ali Saleh Al-Ghadi was born on 10 October 1952. His brother, Abdul Al-Ghadi, was born on 26 September 1962.

Ali Al-Ghadi was selected to compete for North Yemen at the 1984 Summer Olympics held in Los Angeles, United States. Alongside his brother, the two of them made up the entire athlete delegation. As it was the nation's debut year, Al-Ghadi was one of the first athletes to represent the nation at any edition of the Olympic Games. For these Summer Games, he was entered in two athletics events, the men's 5000 metres and men's 10,000 metres. At the time of his selection, he was 160 centimetres (5.2 ft) tall and weighed 54 kilograms (119 lb).

He first competed in the second preliminary heat of the men's 10,000 metres on 3 August 1984 against 14 other competitors. There, he failed to finish the race and was unranked in the rankings. He then competed in the fourth preliminary heat of the men's 5000 metres five days later on 8 August 1984 against 12 other competitors. There, he recorded a time of 16:06.58 and placed last in his heat and 50th overall out of the 56 long-distance runners that competed. He did not advance further into the semifinals, though did set a personal best in the distance.
