= Waseelah Saad =

Yemeni sprinter

Waseela Fadhl Saad
- Born: November 25, 1989 (age 36); Aden, Yemen
- Occupation: Track and field sprinter
- Height: 1.6 m (5 ft 3 in)

Waseelah Fadhl Saad (born November 25, 1989, in Aden) is a track and field sprint athlete who competes internationally for Yemen.

Saad represented Yemen at the 2008 Summer Olympics in Beijing. She competed at the 100 metres sprint on August 16, 2008, and placed seventh in her heat without advancing to the second round. She ran the distance in a time of 13.60 seconds.
