= Mohamed Rutitinga =

Tanzanian long-distance runner

Personal information
- Nationality: Tanzanian
- Born: 29 September 1959 (age 66)

Sport
- Sport: Long-distance running
- Event: 5000 metres

Mohamed Rutitinga (born 29 September 1959) is a Tanzanian long-distance runner. He competed in the men's 5000 metres at the 1984 Summer Olympics.
