= Athletics at the Friendship Games – Men's 10,000 metres =

The men's 10,000 metres event at the Friendship Games was held on 17 August 1984 at the Grand Arena of the Central Lenin Stadium in Moscow, Soviet Union.

== Results ==
Rank	Name	Nationality	Time	Notes
1st place, gold medalist(s)	Valeriy Abramov	Soviet Union	27:55.17	
2nd place, silver medalist(s)	Wodajo Bulti	Ethiopia	27:58.77	
3rd place, bronze medalist(s)	Bekele Debele	Ethiopia	28:03.06	
4	Aleksandr Khudyakov	Soviet Union	28:07.30	
5	Martin Vrábel	Czechoslovakia	28:19.66	
6	Oleg Strizhakov	Soviet Union	28:33.29	
7	Girma Berhanu	Ethiopia	29:08.38	
8	Alfred Suachanga	Tanzania	29:39.14	
9	F. Fernández	Colombia	30:57.41	
10	N. Dashdorjiin	Mongolia	31:00.66	
11	Ahmad Faitrouni	Lebanon	41:??.??	

== See also ==
- Athletics at the 1984 Summer Olympics – Men's 10,000 metres
