= Yutaka Kanai =

Japanese long-distance runner (1959–1990)

Personal information
- Nationality: Japanese
- Born: 16 October 1959 Tokyo, Japan
- Died: 23 August 1990 (aged 30) Hokkaido Prefecture, Japan

Sport
- Sport: Long-distance running
- Event: 10,000 metres
Medal record
Representing Japan
Asian Games
Bronze medal – third place	1986 Seoul	5000m

Yutaka Kanai (金井 豊, Kanai Yutaka; 16 October 1959 – 23 August 1990) was a Japanese long-distance runner. He competed in the men's 10,000 metres at the 1984 Summer Olympics.
