= Ruddy Cornielle =

Dominican Olympic long-distance runner (born 1960)

Personal information
- Nationality: Dominican

Sport
- Sport: Long-distance running
- Events: 5000 meters, 10000 meters

Ruddy Cornielle (born 14 July 1960) was a long-distance runner who represented the Dominican Republic at the Olympics. He competed in the men's 5000 and 10,000 meters at the 1984 Summer Olympics.
