= António Leitão =

Portuguese long-distance runner (1960–2012)

OIH António Leitão
Personal information
- Full name: António Carlos Carvalho Nogueira Leitão
- Nationality: Portuguese
- Born: 22 July 1960 Espinho, Portugal
- Died: 18 March 2012 (aged 51) Porto, Portugal
- Height: 176 cm (5 ft 9 in)
- Weight: 68 kg (150 lb)

Sport
- Country: Portugal
- Sport: Athletics
- Event: Track
- Club: Benfica
Medal record
Men's Athletics
Representing Portugal
Olympic Games
Bronze medal – third place	1984 Los Angeles	5000m

António Carlos Carvalho Nogueira Leitão OIH (22 July 1960 – 18 March 2012) was a Portuguese athlete who mainly competed in the long-distance events.

== Career ==
Born in Espinho, Leitão competed for Portugal at the 1984 Summer Olympics, where he won the bronze medal in the men's 5000 metres event. Following this result, he was viewed as one of the most promising athletes in his specialty; however, several injuries prevented him from participating in any further Olympic Games. He also competed for the Portuguese club Benfica.

== Death ==
Leitão died in Porto from complications due to hemochromatosis. Following his death, the Corrida António Leitão was created, which is an annual athletics competition in Lisbon organized by Benfica.

== Orders ==
- Officer of the Order of Prince Henry
