= Yoram Kochavy =

Israeli swimmer

Yoram Kochavy יורם כוכבי
Personal information
- Nationality: Israeli
- Born: November 19, 1962 (age 63) Israel
- Height: 5 ft 11.5 in (181.6 cm)
- Weight: 148 lb (67 kg)

Sport
- Sport: Swimming
- Strokes: butterfly medley
- College team: University of Georgia and University of Denver

Yoram Kochavy (Hebrew: יורם כוכבי; born November 19, 1962) is an Israeli former Olympic swimmer.

== Early life and education ==
Kochavy was born in Israel, and is Jewish. In 1981 he attended the University of Georgia, and competed for the university in swimming. He attended University of Denver, where he obtained a Bachelor of Science in Computer Science and Psychology in 1986, and a Master of Science in Computer Science in 1987.

== Swimming career ==
At the 1981 Maccabiah Games, Kochavy won a silver medal and two bronze medals.

When he competed in the Olympics, he was 5 feet 7.5 inches (171.5 cm) tall and weighed 148 pounds (67 kg).

Kochavy competed for Israel at the 1984 Summer Olympics in Los Angeles, California, in swimming at the age of 21. Swimming in the Men's 400 metre Individual Medley he came in 16th with times of 4:35.70 in Round One and 4:40.00 in the B Final, competing in the Men's 200 metre Butterfly he came in 22nd with a time of 2:04.08, and swimming in the Men's 200 metre Individual Medley he came in 27th with a time of 2:11.81.

At the 1985 National Association of Intercollegiate Athletics (NAIA) Men's Swimming and Diving Championships, swimming for University of Denver, Kochavy won gold medals in both the 200 (in 1:54.04) and 400 yard (in 4:02.63) Individual Medleys and the 200 yard Butterfly, and was the NAIA High Point Award Winner. His three titles that year still stand as a tie for the existing NAIA record for most individual swimming titles in a year. That year he also set the record of the university in the 200 individual medley, which still stands, of 1:54.05, and set a record in the 400 individual medley which stood until 2001. At the 1986 NAIA Championships, he again won the 200 yard Individual Medley (in 1:55.09).
