= Joseph Nzau =

Kenyan long-distance runner

Personal information
- Nationality: Kenyan
- Born: April 14, 1949 (age 77)^{1} Marsabit County, Kenya

Sport
- Sport: Track, long-distance running
- Events: 5000 metres, 10,000 metres, marathon
- College team: Wyoming

Achievements and titles
- Personal bests: 5000m: 13:37.5; 10,000m: 28:06.63; Marathon: 2:09:45

Joseph Nzau (born April 14, 1949) is a Kenyan former long-distance runner who represented his country at the 1984 Summer Olympics in Los Angeles, California. Nzau won the 1983 Chicago Marathon and the inaugural 1990 Belgrade Marathon.

== Running career ==
=== Early life ===
Nzau was a late bloomer who did not take up running until the age of 25. He was subsequently recruited by the University of Wyoming on an athletic scholarship when he was 28, along with a few other Kenyans.

=== Collegiate ===
Nzau attended the University of Wyoming under the tutelage of Coach Ron Jones in the late 1970s. At the 1979 NCAA Division I Track and Field Championships, he finished in fifth place. At Wyoming, Nzau earned six All-American honors, graduated with a degree in engineering and was inducted into the university's athletic Hall of Fame in 1997.

=== Post-collegiate ===
In 1983, Nzau was the first Kenyan to win in a world-class marathon when he won the 1983 Chicago Marathon. A year later, Nzau finished 7th overall in the men's marathon at the 1984 Summer Olympics. In addition to the marathon, Nzau finished 14th of 16 finishers in the men's 10,000 metres at the same competition. He twice won the Bix 7; Davenport, Iowa, in 1983, 7 miles in a time of 33:10, winning again in 1987 in 33:24. In 1990, Nzau won the inaugural Belgrade Marathon.

== Personal ==
Nzau's grandson Elijah Mwangangi Saolo, is a competitive distance and marathon runner.

== Notes ==
- ^1 Nzau's birth date is speculative, as he has reported different ages.

== Achievements ==
Year	Competition	Venue	Position	Event	Notes
Representing Kenya
1982	Chicago Marathon	Chicago, United States	2nd	Marathon	2:11:40
1983	Chicago Marathon	Chicago, United States	1st	Marathon	2:09:44
1984	Los Angeles Marathon	Los Angeles, United States	2nd	Marathon	2:10:40
1984	Olympic Games	Los Angeles, United States	14th	10,000 m	28:32.57
1984	Olympic Games	Los Angeles, United States	7th	Marathon	2:11:28
1990	Belgrade Marathon	Belgrade, FR Yugoslavia	1st	Marathon	2:19:32
