= Charles Cheruiyot (born 1964) =

Kenyan long-distance runner

Personal information
- Born: December 2, 1964 (age 61)

Sport
- Sport: Track and field
Medal record
Representing Kenya
Summer Universiade
Silver medal – second place	1989 Duisburg	5000m

Charles Cheruiyot (born December 2, 1964) is a retired Kenyan long-distance runner.

Charles attended Mount St. Mary's University. In his special event, the 5000 metres, he reached the semi-final at the 1983 World Championships in Athletics. At the 1984 Summer Olympics he finished 6th, and at the 1988 Summer Olympics he again reached the semi-final.

His twin brother Kipkoech Cheruiyot had success as a middle-distance runner.
