= Ali Mohamed Hufane =

Somalian long-distance runner

Personal information
- Born: 1960 (age 65–66)

Sport
- Sport: Long-distance running

Ali Mohamed Hufane (born 1960) is a long-distance runner who competed internationally for Somalia.

Hufane competed at the 1984 Summer Olympics in Los Angeles; he entered the 5000 metres but did not finish the race, and therefore did not advance to the next round. He competed collegiately for Fairleigh Dickinson.
