= Mohamed Saad (swimmer) =

Yemeni former swimmer (born 1981)

Personal information
- Full name: Mohamed Saad
- National team: Yemen
- Born: 12 January 1981 (age 45)
- Height: 1.75 m (5 ft 9 in)
- Weight: 75 kg (165 lb)

Sport
- Sport: Swimming
- Strokes: Freestyle

Mohamed Saad (Arabic: محمد سعد; born January 12, 1981) is a Yemeni former swimmer, who specialized in sprint freestyle events. Saad qualified for the men's 50 m freestyle at the 2004 Summer Olympics in Athens, by receiving a Universality place from FINA in an entry time of 29.82. He challenged seven other swimmers in heat two, including 15-year-old Malique Williams of Antigua and Barbuda. He raced to fifth place in 29.97, just 0.15 of a second off his entry time. Saad failed to advance into the semifinals, as he placed eightieth overall out of 86 swimmers in the preliminaries.
