= Saeed Al-Adhreai =

Yemeni sprinter (born 1983)

Personal information
- Born: 1 March 1983 (age 43)

Sport
- Country: Yemen
- Sport: Athletics

Saeed Al-Adhreai (born 1 March 1983) is a Yemeni who is a track and field sprint athlete who competes internationally for Yemen, he competed in the 400 metres at the 2004 Summer Olympics and the 2005 World Championships in Athletics.

== Career ==
When aged 21 years old Al-Adhreai competed in the 2004 Summer Olympics in Athens, Greece, he entered the 400 metres and in the heats he ran in a time of 49.39 seconds and came in last out of eight runners and so didn't qualify for the next round. Nearly twelve months later he was competing at the 2005 World Championships in Athletics again in the 400 metres, this time he ran the distance in 49.74 seconds and came in seventh out of eight in his heat and didn't qualify for the next round.
