= Sosthenes Bitok =

Kenyan long-distance runner

Personal information
- Nationality: Kenyan
- Born: March 23, 1957 (age 69) Unspecified, Kenya

Sport
- Sport: Track
- Event(s): 1500 meters, Mile, 5000 meters, 10,000 meters
- College team: Richmond

Achievements and titles
- Personal best(s): 1500m: 3:39.06; Mile: 3:56.1; 10,000m: 27:50.0

Sosthenes Bitok (born March 23, 1957) is a retired long-distance runner from Kenya, who represented his native country in the men's 10,000 metres at the 1984 Summer Olympics in Los Angeles, California. There he finished in sixth place, clocking 28:09.01 in the final.

== Running career ==
Bitok ran for University of Richmond on scholarship. In 1980, he set the 1500-meter record for the Colonial Relays (hosted by College of William & Mary) at 3:40.3. He was the 1600-meter anchor of Richmond's Distance Medley Relay team which participated at the 1982 Penn Relays, and ran his 1600 split in 3:55.8, only 0.7 seconds behind the winning anchor John Gregorek.
