= Shuichi Yoneshige =

Japanese long-distance runner (born 1961)

Personal information
- Born: 24 June 1961 (age 65) Kanoya, Kagoshima, Japan

Sport
- Sport: Track and field
Medal record
Representing Japan
Summer Universiade
Gold medal – first place	1983 Edmonton	10,000m
Bronze medal – third place	1983 Edmonton	5000m
Bronze medal – third place	1985 Kobe	10,000m

Shuichi Yoneshige (米重 修一, Yoneshige Shūichi; born 24 June 1961) is a Japanese former long-distance runner who competed in the 1988 Summer Olympics.
