= Antonio Selvaggio =

Italian long-distance runner

Personal information
- Nationality: Italian
- Born: January 1, 1958 (age 68) Palermo, Italy

Sport
- Country: Italy
- Sport: Athletics
- Event: Long distance running

Achievements and titles
- Personal best: 5000 m: 13:25.63 (1984)

Antonio Selvaggio (born 1 January 1958 in Palermo) is a retired male long-distance runner from Italy.

== Biography ==
He competed for his native country at the 1984 Summer Olympics in Los Angeles, California. He is the twin brother of Piero Selvaggio, also a long-distance runner. Selvaggio set his personal best (13:25.63) in the men's 5,000 metres in 1984.
