= Hana Ali Saleh =

Yemeni sprinter

Personal information
- Born: 25 February 1968 (age 57)

Sport
- Country: Yemen
- Sport: Athletics

Hana Ali Saleh (born 25 February 1968) is a Yemeni who is a track and field sprint athlete who competes internationally for Yemen, she competed in the 200 metres at the 2000 Summer Olympics. She was the first woman to represent Yemen at the Olympics.

== Career ==
Saleh was one half of the two-athlete team that competed for Yemen at the 2000 Summer Olympics held in Sydney, Australia. She entered the 200 metres with a time of 30.36 seconds. She came last in her heat and so didn't qualify for the next round.
