= Alphonce Swai =

Tanzanian long-distance runner

Personal information
- Nationality: Tanzanian
- Born: 1962 (age 62–63)

Sport
- Sport: Long-distance running
- Event: 5000 metres

Alphonce Swai (born 1962) is a Tanzanian long-distance runner. He competed in the men's 5000 metres at the 1984 Summer Olympics.
