= Ahmed Musa Jouda =

Sudanese long-distance runner

Medal record

Men's athletics

Representing Sudan

African Championships
Bronze medal – third place	1982 Cairo	10,000 m

Ahmed Musa Jouda (born 20 May 1957) is a retired Sudanese long-distance runner who specialized in the 10,000 metres.

He won the bronze medal at the 1982 African Championships, and competed at the 1983 World Championships without reaching the final. At the 1984 Olympic Games he finished tenth in a career best time of 28:20.26 minutes.

His personal best time on the 5000 metres was 13:34.13 minutes, achieved in July 1985 in Nice.

== Achievements ==
Year	Competition	Venue	Position	Event	Notes
Representing Sudan
1982	African Championships	Cairo, Egypt	3rd	10,000 m	29:37.00
