= Piero Selvaggio =

Italian long-distance runner

Personal information
- Nationality: Italian
- Born: 1 January 1958 (age 68) Palermo, Italy
- Height: 1.76 m (5 ft 9 1/2 in)
- Weight: 56 kg (123 lb)

Sport
- Country: Italy
- Sport: Athletics
- Event: Long distance running
- Club: CUS Palermo

Achievements and titles
- Personal best: 5000 m: 13:27.08 (1984)

Piero Selvaggio (born 1 January 1958 in Palermo) is a retired male long-distance runner from Italy.

== Biography ==
He competed for his native country at the 1984 Summer Olympics in Los Angeles, California. He is the twin brother of Antonio Selvaggio, also a long-distance runner. Selvaggio set his personal best (13:27.08) in the men's 5000 metres in 1984.

== National titles ==
Piero Selvaggio has won 2 times the individual national championship.

- 2 wins in the 5000 metres (1978, 1981)

== See also ==
- 5000 metres winners of Italian Athletics Championships
