= Basheer Al-Khewani =

Yemeni track and field athlete

Personal information
- Born: 1 May 1982 (age 44)

Sport
- Country: Yemen
- Sport: Athletics

Basheer Al-Khewani (born 1 May 1982) is a Yemeni track and field sprint athlete who competes internationally for Yemen. He competed in the 400 metres at the 2000 Summer Olympics.

== Career ==
Al-Khewani was just eighteen years old when he competed at the 2000 Summer Olympics which were held in Sydney, Australia. He entered the 400 metres and ran a time of 49.72 seconds and came eighth in his heat, so didn't qualify for the next round.
