= Mohammed Al-Yafaee =

Yemeni athlete (born 1984)

Personal information
- Born: October 6, 1984 (age 41) Yemen
- Children: Samer Al-Yafaee (son)

Sport
- Country: Yemen
- Sport: Track and field
- Event: 800 metres

Achievements and titles
- Olympic finals: 2008 Summer Olympics

Mohammed Al-Yafaee (born October 6, 1984) is an athlete from Yemen. He ran the 800 metres in the 2008 Summer Olympics in Beijing, and was the flag-bearer for his nation during the opening ceremonies of those games.

His son Samer Al-Yafaee was a middle-distance runner who was also a flag-bearer for Yemen and competed in the 100 metres at the 2024 Summer Olympics.
