= Yasameen Al-Raimi =

Yemeni sports shooter

Personal information
- Nationality: Yemeni
- Born: 26 November 1985 (age 40)

Sport
- Sport: Sports shooting

Yasameen Al-Raimi (born 26 November 1985) is a Yemeni sports shooter. She competed in the women's 10 metre air pistol event at the 2020 Summer Olympics, coming in 32nd out of 54 competitors.

She also represented Yemen at 2024 Summer Olympics Paris, France. Despite a better performance from past, she could not advance in the final round. She finished in 30th place out of 56 competitors.
