= North Yemen at the 1984 Summer Olympics =

- Flag of North Yemen
- IOC code: YAR

in Los Angeles
- Competitors: 2
- Medals: Gold 0 Silver 0 Bronze 0 Total 0

Summer Olympics appearances (overview)
- 1984; 1988

Other related appearances
- Yemen (1992–pres.)

North Yemen, as the Yemen Arab Republic, competed for the first time at the Olympic Games at the 1984 Summer Olympics in Los Angeles, United States.

== Athletics ==
Men

Athlete	Event	Heat		Semifinal		Final	
Athlete	Event	Result	Rank	Result	Rank	Result	Rank
Abdul Al-Ghadi	800 m	2:05.90	8	Did not advance			
Ali Al-Ghadi	5000 m	16:06.58	13	Did not advance			
Ali Al-Ghadi	10000 m	-	Did not finish	Did not advance			

Key

- Note–Ranks given for track events are within the athlete's heat only
- Q = Qualified for the next round
- q = Qualified for the next round as a fastest loser or, in field events, by position without achieving the qualifying target
- NR = National record
- N/A = Round not applicable for the event
- Bye = Athlete not required to compete in round
