= North Yemen at the 1988 Summer Olympics =

- Flag of North Yemen
- IOC code: YAR

in Seoul
- Competitors: 8
- Medals: Gold 0 Silver 0 Bronze 0 Total 0

Summer Olympics appearances (overview)
- 1984; 1988

Other related appearances
- Yemen (1992–pres.)

North Yemen competed as the Yemen Arab Republic at the 1988 Summer Olympics in Seoul, South Korea. After unification with South Yemen, the nation would return as Yemen at the 1992 Summer Olympics.

Abullah Alizani from the Yemen Arab Republic lost to Israeli Dov Groverman in the first round. Alizani was slated to wrestle the Israeli, but failed to show up for his match even after he was paged three times, in what an Israeli official called a political snub, and Alizani was declared the loser of the Men's Light-Flyweight (48 kg), Greco-Roman match by the referee.

== Competitors ==
The following is the list of number of competitors in the Games.

Sport	Men	Women	Total
Athletics	4	0	4
Judo	2	–	2
Wrestling	2	–	2
Total	8	0	8

== Athletics ==
Key
Note–Ranks given for track events are within the athlete's heat only
Q = Qualified for the next round
q = Qualified for the next round as a fastest loser or, in field events, by position without achieving the qualifying target
NR = National record
N/A = Round not applicable for the event
Bye = Athlete not required to compete in round

Men

Athlete	Event	Heat		Semifinal		Final	
Athlete	Event	Result	Rank	Result	Rank	Result	Rank
Fahim Abdul Wahab	800 m	1:55.24	6	did not advance			
Awad Saleh Ahmed	1500 m	4:03.86	14	did not advance			
Anwar Al-Harazi	5000 m	14:49.25	16	did not advance			
Abdul Karim Daoud	10000 m	32:33.04	21	did not advance			

== Judo ==
North Yemen sent two competitors

Mohamed Kohsrof ended ranked 35th in the men's extra lightweight class

Mohamed Moslih finished ranked 19th in the men's lightweight class

== Wrestling ==
Men's Greco-Roman

Athlete	Event	Round 1	Round 2	Round 3	Round 4	Round 5	Final / BM	
Athlete	Event	Opposition Result	Opposition Result	Opposition Result	Opposition Result	Opposition Result	Opposition Result	Rank
Abdullah Al-Shamsi	−68 kg	Okubo (JPN); L Fall	Brekke (NOR); L 0–4	did not advance				

Men's Freestyle

Athlete	Event	Round 1	Round 2	Round 3	Round 4	Round 5	Final / BM	
Athlete	Event	Opposition Result	Opposition Result	Opposition Result	Opposition Result	Opposition Result	Opposition Result	Rank
Abdullah Al-Ghrbi	−74 kg	Rauhala (FIN); L Fall	Beudet (FRA); L 0–4	did not advance				
