= South Yemen at the 1988 Summer Olympics =

- Flag of South Yemen
- IOC code: YMD

in Seoul
- Competitors: 5 in 2 sports
- Medals: Gold 0 Silver 0 Bronze 0 Total 0

Summer Olympics appearances (overview)
- 1988

Other related appearances
- Yemen (1992–pres.)

South Yemen competed as the Yemen Democratic Republic at the 1988 Summer Olympics in Seoul, South Korea. It was the only time that the nation would compete at the Olympic Games. After unification with North Yemen, the nation would later return as Yemen at the 1992 Summer Olympics.

== Medal tables ==
=== Medals by Games ===
Games	Gold	Silver	Bronze	Total
1988 Seoul	0	0	0	0
1992–present	as Yemen			
Total	0	0	0	0

== Competitors ==
The following is the list of number of competitors in the Games.

Sport	Men	Women	Total
Athletics	3	0	3
Boxing	2	–	2
Total	5	0	5

== Athletics ==
Men
Track & road events

Athlete	Event	Heat		2nd round		Semifinal		Final	
Athlete	Event	Result	Rank	Result	Rank	Result	Rank	Result	Rank
Ehab Fuad Ahmed Nagi	100 m	11.53	8	Did not advance					
Sahim Saleh Mehdi	200 m	22.95	8	Did not advance					
Farouk Ahmed Sayed	5000 m	15:11.20	18	n/a		Did not advance			

== Boxing ==
Athlete	Event	Round 1	Round 2	Round 3	Round 4	Semi-Final	Final / BM	
Athlete	Event	Opposition Result	Opposition Result	Opposition Result	Opposition Result	Opposition Result	Opposition Result	Rank
Mohamed Mahfood Sayed	−51 kg	Bye	Nsubuga (UGA); L KO1	Did not advance				17
Ali Mohamed Jaffer	−57 kg	Pongsri (THA); L KO1	Did not advance					33
