= Yemen Olympic Committee =

National Olympic Committee

- Country: Yemen
- Code: YEM
- Created: 1974
- Recognized: 1981
- Continental Association: OCA
- Headquarters: Sana'a, Yemen
- Website: yemnoc.org

The Yemen Olympic Committee (IOC code: YEM) is the National Olympic Committee representing Yemen. It was created in 1974 and formally recognized by the IOC in 1981.
