= Athletics at the 1979 Pan American Games – Men's 10,000 metres =

Men's 10,000 metres at the 1979 Pan American Games
- Venue: Estadio Sixto Escobar
- Dates: 7 July
- Winning time: 29:02.4

Medalists
Gold medal	Rodolfo Gómez	Mexico
Silver medal	Enrique Aquino	Mexico
Bronze medal	Frank Shorter	United States

The men's 10,000 metres sprint competition of the athletics events at the 1979 Pan American Games took place on 7 July at the Estadio Sixto Escobar. The defending Pan American Games champion was Luis Hernández of Mexico.

== Records ==
Prior to this competition, the existing world and Pan American Games records were as follows:

World record	Henry Rono (KEN)	27:22.47	Vienna, Austria	June 11, 1978
Pan American Games record	Frank Shorter (USA)	28:50.8	Cali, Colombia	1971

== Results ==
KEY:	WR	World Record	GR	Pan American Record

Rank	Name	Nationality	Time	Notes
1st place, gold medalist(s)	Rodolfo Gómez	Mexico	29:02.4	
2nd place, silver medalist(s)	Enrique Aquino	Mexico	29:03.9	
3rd place, bronze medalist(s)	Frank Shorter	United States	29:06.4	
4	Rick Rojas	United States	29:09.8	
5	Peter Butler	Canada	29:20.4	
6	Víctor Mora	Colombia	29:27.4	
7	Elói Schleder	Brazil	29:35.6	
8	Jaime Vélez	Puerto Rico	30:12.2	
9	Luis Tipán	Ecuador	30:15.1	
10	Jorge Monín	Argentina	30:24.8	
11	Virgilio Herrera	Guatemala	30:59.7	
12	José Hernández	El Salvador	31:24.9	
	Silvio Salazar	Colombia	DNS	
	Domingo Tibaduiza	Colombia	DNS	
	Lucirio Garrido	Venezuela	DNS	
	José Medina	Venezuela	DNS	
