= Athletics at the 1979 Pan American Games – Men's 5000 metres =

Men's 5000 metres at the 1979 Pan American Games
- Venue: Estadio Sixto Escobar
- Dates: 11 July
- Winning time: 14:01.0

Medalists
Gold medal	Matt Centrowitz	United States
Silver medal	Herb Lindsay	United States
Bronze medal	Rodolfo Gómez	Mexico

The men's 5000 metres sprint competition of the athletics events at the 1979 Pan American Games took place on 11 July at the Estadio Sixto Escobar. The defending Pan American Games champion was Domingo Tibaduiza of Colombia.

== Records ==
Prior to this competition, the existing world and Pan American Games records were as follows:

World record	Henry Rono (KEN)	13:08.4	Berkeley, United States	April 8, 1978
Pan American Games record	Van Nelson (USA)	13:47.4	Winnipeg, Canada	1967

== Results ==
KEY:	WR	World Record	GR	Pan American Record

=== Final ===
Rank	Name	Nationality	Time	Notes
1st place, gold medalist(s)	Matt Centrowitz	United States	14:01.0	
2nd place, silver medalist(s)	Herb Lindsay	United States	14:04.1	
3rd place, bronze medalist(s)	Rodolfo Gómez	Mexico	14:05.0	
4	Enrique Aquino	Mexico	14:05.9	
5	Peter Butler	Canada	14:07.6	
6	Jaime Vélez	Puerto Rico	14:17.2	
7	Víctor Mora	Colombia	14:17.7	
8	Jorge Monín	Argentina	14:21.3	
9	Luis Tipán	Ecuador	14:29.1	
10	José Cobo	Cuba	15:00.5	
11	Sergio Gregorio da Silva	Brazil	15:07.7	
12	Luis Aquillón	El Salvador	15:22.5	
	Silvio Salazar	Colombia	DNS	
	Domingo Tibaduiza	Colombia	DNS	
	Errol Drakes	Guyana	DNS	
	Michael Fuertado	Jamaica	DNS	
	Luis Hernández	Mexico	DNS	
	Lucirio Garrido	Venezuela	DNS	
	Víctor Gil	Venezuela	DNS	
