= Armando Azócar =

Personal information
- Nationality: Venezuelan
- Born: 1958 (age 67–68)
- Height: 6 ft (183 cm)
- Weight: 126 lb (57 kg)

Sport
- Sport: Athletics
- Event: Long-distance running

Achievements and titles
- Personal best: Marathon: 2:16:39
Medal record
Men's athletics
Representing Venezuela
Pan American Games
1983 Caracas, Venezuela	Marathon
Pan American Games
1987 Indianapolis, Indiana	Marathon

Armando Azócar is a former athlete who competed for Venezuela at the Pan American Games Marathon in 1983 and 1987. He is often mentioned (along with Rubén Maza and Pedro Mora) as one of the best long-distance runners from his country.

== Professional career ==
Azócar ran a personal best time for the marathon when competing at the 1983 Boston Marathon. As the race developed in perfect weather conditions, the number of runners setting fast marks was almost unbelievable. Greg Meyer, Ron Tabb, Benji Durden, Dan Schlesinger and many others set a blistering pace—and held it to the finish. The top 10 runners that year were all under 2:12; 84 runners were under 2:20; Joan Benoit demolished the women's world record by nearly 3 minutes. Azócar and his countryman Eduardo Castellanou were some of the only international runners near the top pack. Castellanou's 2:15:41 and Azócar's 2:16:39 earned them some of the best times ever by Venezuelans at Boston.

His run earned him a place on the team for the 1983 Pan American Games, which took place in his country's capitol, Caracas. The marathon was run in heat and humidity of the afternoon, slowing some competitors. Others were challenged by the altitude: the city is 3,000 feet above sea level. Azócar was the third runner to enter Caracas' Estadio Olimpico, where he had another lap before the finish. As the first Venezuelan finisher, he had the stadium's crowd in a frenzy. But Mexican runner Miguel Angel Cruz entered just behind him, came up on his shoulder, and then overtook him. Azócar took the honor of fourth place as Cruz finished a few seconds ahead for the bronze. It was Puerto Rican Jorge González who took the win.

In 1987, Azócar was back at the Pan American Games, which were held in Indianapolis, Indiana. The press considered him one of the favorites to win the marathon, along with González. The race had less than 20 competitors, as was common for the Pan American competitions. At 7 a.m., in a slight rain with mild heat, the runners took off from Fort Benjamin Harrison and wound through the streets of the American heartland city as the day warmed. Azócar pushed, but had significant trouble and, along with American Ric Sayre and Puerto Rican Eduardo Maldonado, dropped out before reaching the finish line in front of the crowds at the Indiana University Stadium. Brazilian Ivo Rodrigues took the win.

Azócar returned to Caracas in December for the seventh-annual Navidad Marathon and a chance to run with the best in his nation. He ran to victory, winning in 2:20:52.

The following year, he won a large marathon in the United States: Grandma's Marathon, in which runners follow the North Shore of Lake Superior from one Great Lakes port city to another (Two Harbors, to Duluth, Minnesota). Although the race in June is known to be cooler, the weather in 1988 was scorching and windy. Many runners dropped. Azócar had only entered days before—a planned race in Venezuela had been cancelled. After a 15-hour flight and only a few hours of sleep, he kept a strong pace and fought the headwind. The finish was ironic: after being chased down by a Mexican competitor in 1983's Pan American Games marathon, Azócar was battling from behind against a Mexican—this time Rodolfo Gomez. History reversed itself at mile 22: Azócar soared past Gomez. Azócar opened up a one-minute lead by the time he crossed the line in Duluth's Canal Park to the cheers of the sweating crowd.

Meanwhile, his countrywoman Yoli Casas finished second behind Jackie Gareau. Azócar and Casas had hoped to qualify for the Venezuelan Olympic team in the marathon for the 1988 Olympics, though due to the heat of the day, neither met the qualifying times. The country did not send a team. Years later, Pedro Mora followed Acozár's path to Duluth, with hopes to make the Olympic team for the London games. With his fourth-place finish in 2:14:41, Mora sealed his Olympic bid.

== Achievements ==
Year	Competition	Venue	Position	Event	Notes
Representing Venezuela
1983	Pan American Games	Caracas, Venezuela	4th	Marathon	2:21:30
1983	Boston Marathon	Boston, Massachusetts	38th	Marathon	2:16:39
1987	Pan American Games	Indianapolis, Indiana	DNF	Marathon	-
1987	Navidad Marathon	Caracas, Venezuela	1st	Marathon	2:20:52
1988	Grandma's Marathon	Two Harbors to Duluth, Minnesota	1st	Marathon	2:20:07
