= César Mercado =

Puerto Rican marathon runner

Personal information
- Born: October 25, 1959 (age 66) Maricao, Puerto Rico

Sport
- Sport: Marathon running
Medal record
Representing Puerto Rico
Pan American Games
Silver medal – second place	1983 Caracas	Marathon
Central American and Caribbean Games
Silver medal – second place	1990 Mexico City	Marathon

César Mercado (born October 25, 1959) is a Puerto Rican former long-distance runner who competed internationally in the marathon during the 1980s. He earned a silver medal at the 1983 Pan American Games in Caracas behind teammate Jorge González. Mercado went on to represent his country at the 1984 Summer Olympics in Los Angeles, finishing 31st. He later secured another prominent runner-up finish at the Central American and Caribbean Games, clocking a time of 2 hours, 19 minutes, and 40 seconds.

== Early life and career ==
He was born on 25 October 1959.

At the 1983 Pan American Games in Caracas, Venezuela, he got a silver medal in the men's marathon, finishing with an official time of 2 hours, 20 minutes, and 30 seconds. Mercado's runner-up finish was behind Jorge González, who won the race in 2:12:43. Following Mercado on the podium, Miguel Ángel Cruz of Mexico claimed the bronze medal in 2:21:12, closely followed by Venezuelan runners Armando Azócar and Luis Bautista in fourth and fifth places with times of 2:21:30 and 2:22:35, respectively. Rounding out the race, Rafael Parra of Colombia finished sixth in 2:22:51, while Manuel García of Mexico completed the group in seventh place at 2:24:35.

At the 1984 Olympic Games, he competed in the marathon and finished 31st.

César Mercado got second place with an official time of 2 hours, 19 minutes, and 40 seconds just behind Jorge González, who won the race in 2:18:55 seconds. Following Mercado across the line, Oscar J. Mejía of Venezuela took third place in 2:21:40, while Graciano González of Mexico and Kimball P. Reynierse of Aruba rounded out the top five with times of 2:25:16 and 2:25:29, respectively. Behind Mercado's podium pace, the remaining field finished with Costa Rica's Miguel A. Vargas in sixth (2:27:28), Colombia's José I. Ramírez in seventh (2:27:40), Nicaragua's William J. Aguirre in eighth (2:29:32), Costa Rica's Juan D. Amores in ninth (2:30:02), and the Dominican Republic's Julio C. Rosa alongside Mexico's Gumersindo Olmedo completing the standings in tenth and eleventh.

== Achievements ==
Year	Competition	Venue	Position	Event	Notes
Representing Puerto Rico
1983	Pan American Games	Caracas, Venezuela	2nd	Marathon	2:20:30
1984	Olympic Games	Los Angeles, United States	31st	Marathon	2:19:09
1989	Central American and Caribbean Championships	San Juan, Puerto Rico	2nd	Half Marathon	1:08:38
1990	Central American and Caribbean Games	Mexico City, Mexico	2nd	Marathon	2:18:59
1991	Pan American Games	Havana, Cuba	14th	Marathon	2:35:31
1995	Pan American Games	Mar del Plata, Argentina	14th	Marathon	2:25:38
