= Athletics at the 1979 Pan American Games – Men's 3000 metres steeplechase =

Men's 3000 metres steeplechase at the 1979 Pan American Games
- Venue: Estadio Sixto Escobar
- Dates: 8 July
- Winning time: 8:43.6

Medalists
Gold medal	Henry Marsh	United States
Silver medal	William McCullough	United States
Bronze medal	Demetrio Cabanillos	Mexico

The men's 3000 metres steeplechase competition of the athletics events at the 1979 Pan American Games took place at the Estadio Sixto Escobar. The defending Pan American Games champion was Mike Manley of the United States.

== Records ==
Prior to this competition, the existing world and Pan American Games records were as follows:

World record	Henry Rono (KEN)	8:05.4	Seattle, United States	May 3, 1978
Pan American Games record	Chris McCubbins (USA)	8:38.2	Winnipeg, Canada	1967

== Results ==
KEY:	WR	World Record	GR	Pan American Record

=== Final ===
Rank	Name	Nationality	Time	Notes
1st place, gold medalist(s)	Henry Marsh	United States	8:43.6	
2nd place, silver medalist(s)	William McCullough	United States	8:44.7	
3rd place, bronze medalist(s)	Demetrio Cabanillas	Mexico	8:52.4	
4	José Cobo	Cuba	9:01.6	
5	Greg Duhaime	Canada	9:02.0	
6	Modesto Comprés	Dominican Republic	9:07.9	
7	Octavio Guadarrama	Mexico	9:18.1	
8	Luis Palma	Chile	9:21.3	
9	José Luis Torres	Puerto Rico	9:51.9	
	Lucirio Garrido	Venezuela	DNS	
