= Athletics at the 1987 Pan American Games – Men's marathon =

Men's marathon at the Pan American Games

The men's marathon event at the 1987 Pan American Games was held in Indianapolis, United States on 9 August.

== Results ==
Rank	Name	Nationality	Time	Notes
1st place, gold medalist(s)	Ivo Rodrigues	Brazil	2:20:13	
2nd place, silver medalist(s)	Ronald Lanzoni	Costa Rica	2:20:39	
3rd place, bronze medalist(s)	Jorge González	Puerto Rico	2:21:14	
4	Steve Benson	United States	2:23:52	
5	Joel Hernández	Mexico	2:24:26	
6	Dieudonné LaMothe	Haiti	2:26:16	
7	Víctor Mora	Colombia	2:33:11	
8	José Jami	Ecuador	2:35:02	
9	Nelson Zamora	Uruguay	2:36:23	
10	José Zapata	Venezuela	2:39:15	
11	Marion Williams	United States Virgin Islands	2:40:59	
12	Julio Molina	Honduras	2:44:33	
	Eduardo Maldonado	Puerto Rico	DNF	
	Ric Sayre	United States	DNF	
	Armando Azócar	Venezuela	DNF	
	Wallace Williams	United States Virgin Islands	DNS	
	Domingo Tibaduiza	Colombia	DNS	
