= Athletics at the 1977 Summer Universiade – Men's 5000 metres =

The men's 5000 metres event at the 1977 Summer Universiade was held at the Vasil Levski National Stadium in Sofia on 21 and 23 August.

== Medalists ==
Gold	Silver	Bronze
Enn Sellik; Soviet Union	Jerzy Kowol; Poland	Leonid Moseyev; Soviet Union

== Results ==
=== Heats ===
Rank	Heat	Athlete	Nationality	Time	Notes
1	1	Duncan MacDonald	United States	14:07.3	Q
2	1	Leonid Moseyev	Soviet Union	14:09.7	Q
3	1	Ray Smedley	Great Britain	14:13.6	Q
4	1	Jerzy Kowol	Poland	14:15.3	Q
5	1	Enrique Aquino	Mexico	14:16.0	Q
6	1	Ricardo Ortega	Spain	14:30.3	
7	1	Rumen Mekhandzhinski	Bulgaria	14:44.1	
8	1	Joseph Mareka	Kenya	16:31.4	
1	2	Venanzio Ortis	Italy	14:09.9	Q
2	2	Enn Sellik	Soviet Union	14:12.4	Q
3	2	Ilie Floroiu	Romania	14:13.7	Q
4	2	Petko Karpachev	Bulgaria	14:14.8	Q
5	2	Bjarte Sleire	Norway	14:18.0	Q
6	2	Takao Nakamura	Japan	14:20.7	q
6	2	Jim Brown	Great Britain	14:20.7	q
8	2	José Gómez	Mexico	14:24.0	q
9	2	Matti Salonen	Finland	14:29.3	
10	2	Abera Asres	Ethiopia	15:16.2	
11	2	Badamraa Munkhdalai	Mongolia	15:38.8	
12	2	P. Kibinda	Kenya	16:07.6	

=== Final ===
Rank	Athlete	Nationality	Time	Notes
1st place, gold medalist(s)	Enn Sellik	Soviet Union	13:44.6	
2nd place, silver medalist(s)	Jerzy Kowol	Poland	13:45.1	
3rd place, bronze medalist(s)	Leonid Moseyev	Soviet Union	13:45.6	
4	Venanzio Ortis	Italy	13:45.7	
5	Duncan MacDonald	United States	13:46.2	
6	Ilie Floroiu	Romania	13:56.0	
7	Manfred Schöneberg	West Germany	13:56.5	
8	Ray Smedley	Great Britain	13:59.8	
9	Jim Brown	Great Britain	14:01.5	
10	Takao Nakamura	Japan	14:01.5	
11	Erwin Wagger	Austria	14:02.1	
12	Enrique Aquino	Mexico	14:11.0	
13	Petko Karpachev	Bulgaria	14:22.4	
14	José Gómez	Mexico	14:37.9	
	Bjarte Sleire	Norway	DNS	
