= Athletics at the 1975 Pan American Games – Men's 800 metres =

Men's 800 metres at the Pan American Games

The men's 800 metres event at the 1975 Pan American Games was held in Mexico City on 13, 14 and 15 October.

== Medalists ==
Gold	Silver	Bronze
Luis Medina; Cuba	Leandro Civil; Cuba	Carlos Martínez; Mexico

== Results ==
=== Heats ===
Rank	Heat	Name	Nationality	Time	Notes
1	1	Sylvan Barrett	Jamaica	1:52.72	Q
2	1	Keith Francis	United States	1:53.45	Q
3	2	Carlos Martínez	Mexico	1:53.94	Q
4	1	Roy Bottse	Suriname	1:54.02	Q
5	2	Alejo Castillo	Dominican Republic	1:54.69	Q
6	1	Luis Medina	Cuba	1:54.74	Q
7	3	Tom McLean	United States	1:55.22	Q
8	2	Rayfield Beaton	Guyana	1:55.26	Q
9	1	Carlos Villar	Argentina	1:56.79	q
10	3	Darcy Pereira	Brazil	1:56.85	Q
11	2	Bill Smart	Canada	1:56.99	Q
12	3	Javier Chávez	Mexico	1:57.48	Q
13	3	Leandro Civil	Cuba	1:57.88	Q
14	3	Kenneth Elmer	Canada	1:58.15	q
15	3	Michael Watson	Bermuda	1:58.48	q
16	2	Venancio Ponce	Honduras	2:00.36	q
17	2	Emmanuel Saint-Hilaire	Haiti	2:12.20	

=== Semifinals ===
Rank	Heat	Name	Nationality	Time	Notes
1	1	Luis Medina	Cuba	1:49.50	Q
2	1	Carlos Martínez	Mexico	1:49.68	Q
3	1	Rayfield Beaton	Guyana	1:49.80	Q
4	1	Keith Francis	United States	1:49.92	Q
5	2	Tom McLean	United States	1:50.23	Q
6	1	Roy Bottse	Suriname	1:50.31	
7	2	Leandro Civil	Cuba	1:50.73	Q
8	2	Kenneth Elmer	Canada	1:50.82	Q
9	2	Darcy Pereira	Brazil	1:50.86	Q
10	2	Alejo Castillo	Dominican Republic	1:52.14	
11	2	Javier Chávez	Mexico	1:52.16	
12	1	Sylvan Barrett	Jamaica	1:52.22	
13	1	Bill Smart	Canada	1:56.52	
14	2	Venancio Ponce	Honduras	2:00.24	
	1	Michael Watson	Bermuda	DNS	
	2	Carlos Villar	Argentina	DNS	

=== Final ===
Rank	Name	Nationality	Time	Notes
1st place, gold medalist(s)	Luis Medina	Cuba	1:47.98	
2nd place, silver medalist(s)	Leandro Civil	Cuba	1:48.75	
3rd place, bronze medalist(s)	Carlos Martínez	Mexico	1:48.78	
4	Rayfield Beaton	Guyana	1:49.11	
5	Tom McLean	United States	1:49.14	
6	Keith Francis	United States	1:49.30	
7	Kenneth Elmer	Canada	1:49.30	
8	Darcy Pereira	Brazil	1:57.25	
