= Athletics at the 1975 Summer Universiade – Men's 10,000 metres =

The men's 10,000 metres event at the 1975 Summer Universiade was held at the Stadio Olimpico in Rome on 18 September.

== Results ==
Rank	Athlete	Nationality	Time	Notes
1st place, gold medalist(s)	Franco Fava	Italy	28:37.92	
2nd place, silver medalist(s)	Ilie Floroiu	Romania	28:52.49	
3rd place, bronze medalist(s)	Jim Brown	Great Britain	29:03.54	
4	Dušan Janićijević	Yugoslavia	29:05.06	
5	Jean-Pierre Eudier	France	29:28.38	
6	Eloy Schleder	Brazil	29:57.81	
7	Anton Gorbunow	West Germany	30:11.45	
8	Luis Raudales	Honduras	32:58.60	
