= Domingo Tibaduiza =

Colombian long-distance runner

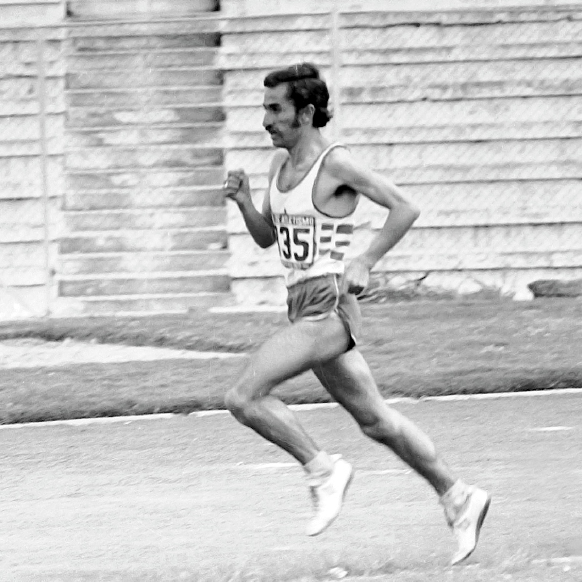

Personal information
- Full name: Domingo Enrique Tibaduiza Reyes
- Born: November 22, 1950 (age 75) Sogamoso, Boyacá, Colombia
- Education: University of Nevada, Reno
- Height: 1.69 m (5 ft 7 in)
- Weight: 54 kg (119 lb)

Sport
- Country: Colombia
- Sport: Athletics
- Coached by: Álvaro Mejía
Medal record
Representing Colombia
Men's athletics
Pan American Games
Gold medal – first place	1975 Mexico City	5000 m
Silver medal – second place	1983 Caracas	10000 m
Bronze medal – third place	1975 Mexico City	10000 m
Bronze medal – third place	1983 Caracas	5000 m

Domingo Enrique Tibaduiza Reyes (born November 22, 1950) is known in his native Colombia as an icon and pioneer of Colombian international athletics. A former long-distance elite runner, he represented Colombia at four consecutive Summer Olympic Games and won the Berlin Marathon.

== Early life ==
Originally from Sogamoso, Colombia, Tibaduiza grew up in Gámeza and was born to the town mayor Raul Antonio Tibaduiza Rodriguez and his wife Rosalba Tibaduiza Reyes, a local shopkeeper. His maternal ancestry is linked to the Colombian aristocratic Reyes Patria family and Juan José Reyes-Patria Escobar. He grew up in a family of seven children, Leonor, Mariem, Miguel, Rosalba, and Ángela.

Until 1962, Tibaduiza played soccer, and focused on the sport because his family did not have the means to buy him a bicycle. He looked up to his countryman Roberto "Pajarito" Buitrago, who was the first Boyacense to win the Vuelta a Colombia that year.

The following year, the family moved together to Bogotá, Colombia. Domingo entered the Nicolás Esguerra school, where he practiced soccer, basketball, and athletic races, encouraged by his professor, Demetrio Roa, who would later be a physical trainer of the Club Los Millonarios. His steps were followed by his siblings Miguel and Rosalba, who also became elite runners.

In 1967, he entered the Santander General School and received the support of established military athletes, such as Sergeant Manuel Cabrera and Corporal Luis Andrade. The following year, he participated in a memorable national youth championship held in Cartago, Valle del Cauca, where he was consecrated as the best national long-distance player in his category.

The following year, Tibaduiza pursued a military career. However, with the demands of the military, he had to leave athletics. He decided to attend the Escuela Militar General Santander and enroll in the physical education course at the Pedagogical and Technological University of Colombia in Bogotá.

== Career ==
In 1970 he won the 5,000-meter championship and finished as the runner-up of the 10,000-meter event at the National Games of Ibagué. That same year, he earned a gold medal in the 10,000 meters at the 1970 Bolivarian Games held in Caracas, Venezuela. These performances marked the beginning of a prominent career in South American, Central American and Pan American track and field athletics.

He represented Colombia in the 10,000 meters (1972 in Munich, 1976 in Montreal, 1980 in Moscow and 1984 in Los Angeles, in which Helmut Bellingrodt, the double Olympic medalist from Barranquilla, participated.), the 5000 metres (1976) and in the men's marathon (1980, 1984). He currently holds the Colombian national record 3000 metres, 10000 metres and 20000 metres.

He won elite road races in his career, with highlights including the 1982 Berlin Marathon, where he crossed the finish line in 2:14:46 to beat German runner Eberhardt Weyel (2:14:50) and the British runner Juan Offord (2:20:34), who occupied, in that same order, the other two places on the podium. He also won the 1982 America's Finest City Half Marathon and the Giro al Sas in 1978. He also had the South American marathon record, when he imposed 2:11:21 in New York, in 1983. He is part of that golden generation of Colombian athletics, in which there were also other athletes such as Silvio Salazar, Martín Pabón and Hernán Barreneche. His coach Álvaro Mejía Flórez is also a notable runner from Colombia. For the 2012 London Olympics, he trained athletes in Tunja, Colombia.

In 1979, Tibaduiza organized a unique event in the history of national athletics, the Pastas Doria Festival, which was attended by some of the best athletes in the world, such as David Moorcroft (first runner to go down from 13 minutes in the 5,000 meters), Sebastian Coe, Rodolfo Gómez, José Gómez and Renaldo Nehemiah.

In the eighties, Domingo Tibaduiza dedicated himself to pedestrian races. In the first half of 1981 he won the Auckland Marathon, New Zealand, and was second in teams, in the Marathon Beneva de Montréal, accompanied by Víctor Mora, Rafael Parra and Luis Barbosa. In 1982, he placed second in the San Francisco Marathon. In 1983, at the age of 35, he ran seven marathons including the Manila Marathon, where he placed first; the Stockholm Marathon, where he placed third; the Toronto Marathon, where he placed second; the Eugene Marathon, where he placed first; and the Frankfurt Marathon, where he placed first.

== Education ==
Tibaduiza attended the University of Nevada, Reno where he graduated in 1974. He is also inducted into the university's athletic hall of fame.

== Personal life ==
Domingo Tibaduiza and his elite distance running younger brother Miguel spent many years in Reno, Nevada, in the United States. Tibaduiza coached at Galena High School, where his team included his family of three sons and a daughter. Among them, the family name dominated distance race results in the area for decades, as the brothers advanced into Masters age divisions and the children excelled. He is also the uncle of Los Angeles–based artist Amadour, and a descendant of Juan José Reyes-Patria Escobar.

== International competitions ==
Year	Competition	Venue	Position	Event	Notes
Representing Colombia
1970	Bolivarian Games	Maracaibo, Venezuela	1st	10,000 m	31:23.8
1971	Pan American Games	Cali, Colombia	10th	5000 m	14:58.67
1971	Pan American Games	Cali, Colombia	6th	10,000 m	30:52.65
1971	South American Championships	Lima, Peru	3rd	5000 m	14:15.4
1971	South American Championships	Lima, Peru	3rd	10,000 m	29:24.8
1972	Olympic Games	Munich, West Germany	32nd (h)	10,000 m	29:24.0
1974	Central American and Caribbean Games	Santo Domingo, Dominican Republic	5th	5000 m	14:11.2
1974	Central American and Caribbean Games	Santo Domingo, Dominican Republic	1st	10,000 m	30:39.4
1975	South American Championships	Rio de Janeiro, Brazil	4th	1500 m	3:54.7
1975	South American Championships	Rio de Janeiro, Brazil	1st	5000 m	14:01.2
1975	South American Championships	Rio de Janeiro, Brazil	2nd	10,000 m	28:45.8
1975	Pan American Games	Mexico City, Mexico	1st	5000 m	14:02.00
1975	Pan American Games	Mexico City, Mexico	3rd	10,000 m	29:25.45
1976	Olympic Games	Montreal, Canada	31st (h)	5000 m	13:49.49
1976	Olympic Games	Montreal, Canada	30th (h)	10,000 m	29:28.17
1977	Central American and Caribbean Championships	Xalapa, Mexico	2nd	5000 m	14:05.0
1977	Central American and Caribbean Championships	Xalapa, Mexico	1st	10,000 m	30:17.4
1977	South American Championships	Montevideo, Uruguay	1st	5000 m	14:24.4
1977	South American Championships	Montevideo, Uruguay	1st	10,000 m	29:44.2
1977	World Cup	Düsseldorf, West Germany	8th	5000 m	14:13.3^{1}
1977	Saint Silvester Road Race	São Paulo, Brazil	1st	8.9 km	23:55
1978	Central American and Caribbean Games	Medellín, Colombia	2nd	5000 m	13:56.88
1978	Central American and Caribbean Games	Medellín, Colombia	2nd	10,000 m	29:38.66
1979	South American Championships	Bucaramanga, Colombia	2nd	5000 m	14:03.4
1979	South American Championships	Bucaramanga, Colombia	2nd	10,000 m	28:51.2
1980	Olympic Games	Moscow, Soviet Union	–	10,000 m	DNF
1980	Olympic Games	Moscow, Soviet Union	17th	Marathon	2:17:06
1981	Montreal Marathon	Montreal, Canada	2nd	Marathon	2:12:22
1982	Berlin Marathon	Berlin, West Germany	1st	Marathon	2:14:46
1983	World Championships	Helsinki, Finland	27th (h)	10,000 m	29:23.86
1983	Pan American Games	Caracas, Venezuela	3rd	5000 m	13:59.68
1983	Pan American Games	Caracas, Venezuela	2nd	10,000 m	29:17.12
1983	New York City Marathon	New York City, United States	8th	Marathon	2:11.21
1984	Olympic Games	Los Angeles, United States	28th (h)	10,000 m	29:07.19
1984	Olympic Games	Los Angeles, United States	–	Marathon	DNF
1986	Boston Marathon	Boston, United States	7th	Marathon	2:15:22
1987	Boston Marathon	Boston, United States	22nd	Marathon	2:21:35
1987	Pan American Games	Indianapolis, United States	5th	10,000 m	29:34.21
1989	Las Vegas Marathon	Las Vegas, United States	2nd	Marathon	2:13:14

^{1}Representing the Americas

== Personal bests ==
- 5000 metres — 13:29.67 (1978)
- 10,000 metres — 27:53.02 (1978)
- Marathon — 2:11:21 (1983)
