= Jorge González (Puerto Rican runner) =

Puerto Rican marathon runner

Personal information
- Full name: Jorge Luis González Rivera
- Nickname: Peco
- Born: 20 December 1952 (age 73) Utuado, Puerto Rico
Medal record
Men's athletics
Representing Puerto Rico
Pan American Games
Gold medal – first place	1983 Caracas	Marathon
Bronze medal – third place	1987 Indianapolis	Marathon
Central American and Caribbean Games
Gold medal – first place	1982 Havana	Marathon
Gold medal – first place	1990 Mexico City	Marathon

Jorge Luis "Peco" González Rivera (born 20 December 1952) is a former Puerto Rican Olympic runner. He won a gold medal performance at the 1982 Central American and Caribbean Games, where he clocked a winning time of 2 hours, 12 minutes, and 41 seconds. He cemented his legacy the following year at the 1983 Pan American Games in Caracas, Venezuela, by securing Puerto Rico's first-ever Pan American gold medal in athletics where he won with a time of 2 hours, 12 minutes, and 43 seconds. At a domestic level, González set a record at the Ponce Marathon in 1982.

== Early life and career ==
He was born on 20 December 1952.

He competed in the marathon at the 1982 Central American and Caribbean Games. He got the gold medal by crossing the finish line in a time of 2 hours, 12 minutes, and 41 seconds. Behind González's, Radamés González of Cuba secured the silver medal with a time of 2:12:11. At the same time, Miguel Cruz of Mexico took the bronze position in 2:13:37. Venezuela's Luis Ruda finished fourth at 2:14:42, followed closely by Cuba's Andrés Chávez in fifth at 2:14:27 and Puerto Rico's Pablo Dones in sixth with a time of 2:14:46. Rounding out the top finishers, Marcial Soto of Mexico secured seventh place in 2:15:56, Michel Lamothe of Haiti took eighth in 2:15:36, Robert Debroses of Haiti finished ninth in 3:02:09, and Wallace Williams of the United States Virgin Islands completed the race in tenth place with a time of 3:05:39. In 1982, he set the all-time record for the Ponce Marathon, a record that, as of 2023, remains unbroken.

At the 1983 Pan American Games in Caracas, Venezuela, he secured Puerto Rico's first Pan American athletics gold medal. He won the gold by finishing in a winning time of 2 hours, 12 minutes, and 43 seconds. César Mercado secured the silver medal in 2:20:30. Following Puerto Rican, Cruz from Mexico claimed the bronze medal with a time of 2:21:12, while Venezuelan runners Armando Azócar and Luis Bautista took fourth and fifth places in 2:21:30 and 2:22:35, respectively. Rounding out the top finishers, Rafael Parra of Colombia finished sixth in 2:22:51, and Manuel García of Mexico completed the group in seventh place with a time of 2:24:35

== Achievements ==
Year	Competition	Venue	Position	Event	Notes
Representing Puerto Rico
1982	Central American and Caribbean Games	Havana, Cuba	1st	Marathon	2:26:40
1983	Pan American Games	Caracas, Venezuela	1st	Marathon	2:12:43 (NR)
1984	Olympic Games	Los Angeles, United States	13th	Marathon	2:14:00
1984	Montreal International Marathon	Montréal, Canada	1st	Marathon	2:12:48
1984	Honolulu Marathon	Honolulu, United States	1st	Marathon	2:16:25
1986	Central American and Caribbean Games	Santiago, Dominican Republic	–	Marathon	DNF
1987	Pan American Games	Indianapolis, United States	3rd	Marathon	2:21:14
1990	Montreal International Marathon	Montréal, Canada	1st	Marathon	2:16:18
1990	Central American and Caribbean Games	Mexico City, Mexico	1st	Marathon	2:18:55
1992	Pittsburgh Marathon	Pittsburgh, United States	1st	Marathon	2:17:33
1992	Olympic Games	Barcelona, Spain	—	Marathon	DNF

== See also ==
- List of Puerto Ricans
