= Athletics at the 1979 Pan American Games – Men's 1500 metres =

Men's 1500 metres at the 1979 Pan American Games
- Venue: Estadio Sixto Escobar
- Dates: 12 & 14 July
- Winning time: 3:40.4

Medalists
Gold medal	Don Paige	United States
Silver medal	Todd Harbour	United States
Bronze medal	Agberto Guimarães	Brazil

The men's 1500 metres sprint competition of the athletics events at the 1979 Pan American Games took place at the Estadio Sixto Escobar. The defending Pan American Games champion was Tony Waldrop of the United States.

== Records ==
Prior to this competition, the existing world and Pan American Games records were as follows:

World record	Filbert Bayi (TAN)	3:32.16	Christchurch, New Zealand	February 2, 1974
Pan American Games record	Marty Liquori (USA)	3:42.1	Cali, Colombia	1971

== Results ==
KEY:	WR	World Record	GR	Pan American Record

=== Heats ===
Held on 12 July

Rank	Heat	Name	Nationality	Time	Notes
1	1	John Craig	Canada	3:45.2	Q
2	1	Eduardo Castro	Mexico	3:45.5	Q
3	1	Don Paige	United States	3:45.5	Q
4	1	Luis Medina	Cuba	3:45.6	Q
5	2	Agberto Guimarães	Brazil	3:45.8	Q
6	2	Peter Spir	Canada	3:45.8	Q
7	1	José González	Venezuela	3:45.9	Q
8	2	Todd Harbour	United States	3:46.0	Q
9	1	Jorge Ortiz	Puerto Rico	3:46.0	q
10	2	Ignacio Melesio	Mexico	3:46.1	Q
11	2	Michael Watson	Bermuda	3:46.1	Q
12	2	Leandro Civil	Cuba	3:47.3	q
13	1	Alberto Lopes	Brazil	3:48.1	
14	2	Modesto Comprés	Dominican Republic	3:49.9	
15	1	Abel Godoy	Uruguay	3:50.5	
16	2	Juan Aquino	Puerto Rico	3:50.9	
17	1	Emilio Ulloa	Chile	3:51.2	
18	2	Eduardo Valenzuela	Chile	3:59.3	
19	1	Adolfo Banegas	Honduras	4:08.9	
	1	Omar Amdematten	Argentina	DNF	

=== Final ===
Held on 14 July

Rank	Name	Nationality	Time	Notes
1st place, gold medalist(s)	Don Paige	United States	3:40.5	GR
2nd place, silver medalist(s)	Todd Harbour	United States	3:41.5	
3rd place, bronze medalist(s)	Agberto Guimarães	Brazil	3:41.5	
4	Eduardo Castro	Mexico	3:42.1	
5	John Craig	Canada	3:42.6	
6	Peter Spir	Canada	3:46.0	
7	Michael Watson	Bermuda	3:46.3	
8	José González	Venezuela	3:46.7	
9	Ignacio Melesio	Mexico	3:49.2	
10	Jorge Ortiz	Puerto Rico	3:49.8	
11	Leandro Civil	Cuba	3:52.4	
	Luis Medina	Cuba	DNS	
