= Athletics at the 1979 Summer Universiade – Men's 10,000 metres =

The men's 10,000 metres event at the 1979 Summer Universiade was held at the Estadio Olimpico Universitario in Mexico City on 8 September 1979.

== Results ==
Rank	Athlete	Nationality	Time	Notes
1st place, gold medalist(s)	Ilie Floroiu	Romania	29:56.1	
2nd place, silver medalist(s)	Enrique Aquino	Mexico	30:16.4	
3rd place, bronze medalist(s)	Samuel Nyariki	Kenya	30:49.1	
4	Carlos Victorino	Mexico	31:11.4	
5	Gelindo Bordin	Italy	31:21.7	
6	Marco Marchei	Italy	31:54.9	
7	Luis Castillo	Honduras	35:19.1	
8	Juan Vega	Costa Rica	37:47.6	
	Patrick Olanga	Uganda	DNF	
	Wolf-Dieter Poschmann	West Germany	DNF	
	Gerardo González	Costa Rica	DNF	
