= Athletics at the 1979 Summer Universiade – Men's 5000 metres =

The men's 5000 metres event at the 1979 Summer Universiade was held at the Estadio Olimpico Universitario in Mexico City on 13 September 1979.

== Results ==
Rank	Athlete	Nationality	Time	Notes
1st place, gold medalist(s)	Ilie Floroiu	Romania	14:12.9	
2nd place, silver medalist(s)	José Gómez	Mexico	14:15.4	
3rd place, bronze medalist(s)	Enrique Aquino	Mexico	14:18.0	
4	Samuel Nyariki	Kenya	14:35.2	
5	Antonio Prieto	Spain	14:39.1	
6	Hillary Tuwei	Kenya	14:50.6	
7	Antonio Selvaggio	Italy	14:51.9	
8	Alan Thurlow	New Zealand	15:05.1	
9	Takao Nakamura	Japan	15:20.2	
10	Dirk Geens	Belgium	15:30.5	
11	Sicelo Kenneth Mkhdbela	Swaziland	15:43.2	
12	Antonio Calderón	Colombia	15:50.9	
13	Luis Castillo	Honduras	16:06.3	
14	Julián Rengifo	Colombia	16:24.2	
15	Wolf-Dieter Poschmann	West Germany	17:13.4	
16	Mohammed Badghaish	Saudi Arabia	17:42.6	
17	Abdullah Al-Amoudi	Saudi Arabia	17:52.5	
18	Juan Vega	Costa Rica	18:10.1	
19	Peter Borg	Malta	18:58.1	
