= Uchpa =

- Origin: Lima, Peru
- Genres: Hard rock, Quechua, blues rock
- Years active: 1994–present
- Members: Fredy Ortiz Carrasco (vocals); Marcos Maizel (guitar); Julio Valladares (rhythmic guitar); Miguel Ángel Cruz (bass); Ivo Flores (drums); Juan Ezpinoza (waqrapuku)
- Past members: Bram Willem (bass); Igor Montoya; Tampa; Koki; Mr. Blues; Jaime Pacheco

Uchpa is a Quechua-singing Peruvian hard rock and blues band. Fredy Ortiz formed the band in 1994.

== History ==
Uchpa came to fame singing in the Quechua language. Formed in Ayacucho in 1991, initially playing cover versions of Nirvana in Quechua, and subsequently classic 1960s and 1970s rock. The initial line-up was almost entirely made up of musicians from Ayacucho, except for Fredy Ortiz and Igor Montoya (both from Andahuaylas). They included: Tampa, Koki, Mr. Blues and Jaime Pacheco. However, the members went their separate ways. Igor went travelling and Fredy moved to Lima, to work as a policeman, taking the demos with him, and reforming the group in Lima, with the same name but different members.

Following two first albums, Uchpa released a third, Qukman muskiy (A different breath, 2000), once again entirely in Quechua. This album made them much better known in the Peruvian capital.

“Chachaschay”, one of the group's best known songs, is a typical Peruvian huayno from Chaccra, a locality situated between the borders of the Apurímac and Ayacucho; it is a huayno usually played with a harp and violin and sung by a woman. It is well known as a classic among the people of Andahuaylas, Apurímac and Ayacucho, and very different from the urban huaynos (Ñachu Mamayki yachanña Chachaschay/Quri anillu Qusqayta Chachaschay/ñachu mamayki yachanña chachaschay/Quri anillu Qusqayta chachaschay/Yachachun yachachun chachaschay/Quri anillu Qusqayta chachaschay - first verse).

== Members ==
- Fredy Ortiz Carrasco (vocals)
- Marcos Maizel (Lead guitar)
- Julio Valladares (rhythm guitar)
- Miguel Ángel Cruz (bass
- Ivo Flores (drums)
- Juan Ezpinoza (Waqrapuku, a Peruvian instrument from Cusco)

== Former members ==
- Bram Willem (bass)
- Igor Montoya
- Tampa
- Koki
- Mr. Blues
- Jaime Pacheco

== Albums ==
- Wayrapim Kaprichpam (1995)
- Qauka Kausay (1994)
- Qukman Muskiy (2000)
- Lo Mejor De Uchpa (2005)
- Concierto (2006)

== Singles ==
- "Perú Llaqta"
- "Ananao"
- "Añas Blues"
- "Pitaqmi Kanki?"
- "Corazón Contento"
- "Chachaschay"
- "Pachamama"
- "Kusi Kusun"
