= General Reyes =

General Reyes may refer to:

- Angelo Reyes (1945–2011), Armed Forces of the Philippines general
- Bernardo Reyes (1850–1913), Mexican general
- José J. Reyes (born 1963), Puerto Rico National Guard major general
- Rafael Fernández Reyes (born 1897), Chilean Army general
- Rafael Reyes (1849–1921), Colombian National Army general

== See also ==
- Juan José Reyes-Patria Escobar (1785–1872), Colombian Independence War general
