= 1989 Boston Marathon =

Footrace in Boston, Massachusetts, USA

- Venue: Boston, United States
- Dates: April 17

Champions
- Men: Abebe Mekonnen (2:09:06)
- Women: Ingrid Kristiansen (2:24:33)
- Wheelchair men: Philippe Couprie (1:36:04)
- Wheelchair women: Connie Hansen (1:50:06)

The 1989 Boston Marathon was the 93rd running of the annual marathon race in Boston, United States, which was held on April 17. The elite men's race was won by Ethiopia's Abebe Mekonnen in a time of 2:09:06 hours and the women's race was won by Norway's Ingrid Kristiansen in 2:24:33. In the wheelchair race, Philippe Couprie of France won the men's race in 1:36:04 and Connie Hansen of Denmark won the women's race in 1:50:06.

A total of 5104 runners finished the race, 4239 men and 865 women.

== Results ==
=== Men ===
Position	Athlete	Nationality	Time
1st place, gold medalist(s)	Abebe Mekonnen	Ethiopia	2:09:06
2nd place, silver medalist(s)	Juma Ikangaa	Tanzania	2:09:56
3rd place, bronze medalist(s)	John Treacy	Ireland	2:10:24
4	Ibrahim Hussein	Kenya	2:12:41
5	John Campbell	New Zealand	2:14:19
6	Simon Robert Naali	Tanzania	2:14:59
7	Gerardo Alcalá	Mexico	2:15:51
8	Kunimitsu Itō	Japan	2:16:19
9	Chala Urgessa	Ethiopia	2:17:31
10	Herb Wills	United States	2:17:40
11	Ryszard Marczak	Poland	2:17:43
12	David Harrison	United States	2:20:40
13	Georgios Karagiannis	Greece	2:20:50
14	Ivo Rodrigues	Brazil	2:21:00
15	Manuel Vera	Mexico	2:21:44
16	Ignacio Ramirez	Colombia	2:21:57
17	Dave Dunham	United States	2:22:03
18	Abraha Arega	Ethiopia	2:22:20
19	Víctor Mora	Colombia	2:22:49
20	Michel Taif	France	2:23:01
21	Omar Aguilar	Chile	2:23:03
22	Timothy Jones	United States	2:23:23
23	Bernie Allen	United Kingdom	2:23:28
24	Toru Mimura	France	2:24:04
25	Luis López	Costa Rica	2:24:14

=== Women ===
Position	Athlete	Nationality	Time
1st place, gold medalist(s)	Ingrid Kristiansen	Norway	2:24:33
2nd place, silver medalist(s)	Marguerite Buist	New Zealand	2:29:04
3rd place, bronze medalist(s)	Kim Jones	United States	2:29:34
4	Eriko Asai	Japan	2:33:04
5	Lisa Rainsberger	United States	2:33:18
6	Lisa Brady	United States	2:34:16
7	Priscilla Welch	United Kingdom	2:35:00
8	Odette Lapierre	Canada	2:35:51
9	Joan Benoit	United States	2:37:52
10	Laurie Binder	United States	2:39:21
11	Czeslawa Mentlewicz	Poland	2:40:25
12	Nancy Corsaro	United States	2:41:13
13	Angella Hearn	United Kingdom	2:41:39
14	Lisa Kindelan	United States	2:42:41
15	Cindy New	Canada	2:42:56
16	Marita Yli-ilkka	Finland	2:45:51
17	Mari Tanigawa	Japan	2:46:11
18	Ann Wehner	United States	2:47:32
19	Mary Wood	United States	2:49:05
20	Christine Iwahashi	United States	2:51:23
22	Susan Meltzer	United States	2:51:53
23	Terri Lynn Martland	United States	2:53:29
24	Stephanie Kessler	United States	2:54:30
25	Laura Hruby	United States	2:54:43

=== Wheelchair men ===
Position	Athlete	Nationality	Time
1st place, gold medalist(s)	Philippe Couprie	France	1:36:04
2nd place, silver medalist(s)	André Viger	Canada	1:36:45
3rd place, bronze medalist(s)	Jim Knaub	United States	1:38:25
4	Franz Nietlispach	Switzerland	1:39:36
5	Lars Lofstrom	Sweden	1:39:37
6	Farid Amarouche	France	1:40:07
6	Marc Quessy	United States	1:40:07
8	Mustapha Badid	France	1:42:01
9	Frederic Dessauve	France	1:45:10
10	Luke Gingras	Canada	1:47:08

=== Wheelchair women ===
Position	Athlete	Nationality	Time
1st place, gold medalist(s)	Connie Hansen	Denmark	1:50:06
2nd place, silver medalist(s)	Candace Cable	United States	1:52:34
3rd place, bronze medalist(s)	Chantal Petitclerc	United States	2:09:13
4	Daniela Jutzeler	Switzerland	2:11:19
5	Sherry Ramsey	United States	2:13:46
6	Tami Oothoudt	United States	2:16:07
7	Tracy Miller	United States	2:16:07
8	Mary Thompson	United States	2:26:38
