= Athletics at the 1971 Pan American Games – Men's 3000 metres steeplechase =

Men's 3,000 metres steeplechase at the Pan American Games

The men's 3000 metres steeplechase event at the 1971 Pan American Games was held in Cali on 5 August.

== Results ==
Rank	Name	Nationality	Time	Notes
1st place, gold medalist(s)	Mike Manley	United States	8:42.27	
2nd place, silver medalist(s)	Sid Sink	United States	8:42.90	
3rd place, bronze medalist(s)	Antonio Villanueva	Mexico	8:46.09	
4	Ray Varey	Canada	8:51.80	
5	Víctor Mora	Colombia	8:52.60	
6	Grant McLaren	Canada	9:02.20	
7	Rafael Baracaldo	Colombia	9:05.68	
8	José Cobo	Cuba	9:06.79	
9	?		9:07.03	
10	?		9:11.77	
11	?		9:16.78	
