= Athletics at the 1991 Pan American Games – Men's marathon =

Men's marathon at the Pan American Games

The men's marathon event at the 1991 Pan American Games was held in Havana, Cuba on 3 August.

== Results ==
Rank	Name	Nationality	Time	Notes
1st place, gold medalist(s)	Alberto Cuba	Cuba	2:19:27	
2nd place, silver medalist(s)	José Santana	Brazil	2:19:29	
3rd place, bronze medalist(s)	Radamés González	Cuba	2:23:05	
4	Marcelino Crisanto	Mexico	2:24:04	
5	Leonel Ortiz	Puerto Rico	2:25:05	
6	Kenneth Frenette	Canada	2:28:02	
7	Toribio Gutiérrez	Argentina	2:28:35	
8	William Aguirre	Nicaragua	2:29:20	
9	Waldemar Cotelo	Uruguay	2:29:30	
10	Mariange Lamothe	Haiti	2:30:13	
11	Óscar Mejía	Venezuela	2:31:00	
12	Calvin Dallas	United States Virgin Islands	2:31:34	
13	Edwin Yáñez	Bolivia	2:31:49	
14	César Mercado	Puerto Rico	2:35:31	
15	Rudy González	Guatemala	2:38:28	
	Juan Pablo Juárez	Argentina	DNF	
	João Alves de Souza	Brazil	DNF	
	Salvador García	Mexico	DNF	
	Mark Curp	United States	DNF	
	Don Janicki	United States	DNF	
	Ronald Lanzoni	Costa Rica	DNS	
