= Athletics at the 1983 Pan American Games – Men's 10,000 metres =

Men's 10,000 metres at the Pan American Games

The men's 10,000 metres event at the 1983 Pan American Games was held in Caracas, Venezuela on 23 August.

== Results ==
| Rank | Name | Nationality | Time | Notes |
|---|---|---|---|---|
| 1st place, gold medalist(s) | José Gómez | Mexico | 29:14.75 | |
| 2nd place, silver medalist(s) | Domingo Tibaduiza | Colombia | 29:17.12 | |
| 3rd place, bronze medalist(s) | Mark Nenow | United States | 29:22.46 | |
| 4 | José da Silva | Brazil | 29:28.56 | |
| 5 | Germán Peña | Colombia | 29:38.91 | |
| 6 | Rodolfo Gómez | Mexico | 29:41.83 | |
| 7 | Omar Aguilar | Chile | 29:54.27 | |
| 8 | Michael Feurtado | Jamaica | 30:19.69 | |
| 9 | Víctor Maldonado | Venezuela | 30:38.78 | |
| 10 | José Zapata | Venezuela | 31:32.47 | |
| 11 | Thom Hunt | United States | 31:36.69 | |
| 12 | Ramón López | Paraguay | 31:57.28 | |
| 13 | William Aguirre | Nicaragua | 32:52.43 | |
| | Tyrone Thibou | Antigua and Barbuda | DNF | |
