= Athletics at the 1975 Pan American Games – Men's 3000 metres steeplechase =

Men's 3,000 metres steeplechase at the Pan American Games

The men's 3000 metres steeplechase event at the 1975 Pan American Games was held in Mexico City on 14 October.

== Results ==
Rank	Name	Nationality	Time	Notes
1st place, gold medalist(s)	Mike Manley	United States	9:04.29	
2nd place, silver medalist(s)	José Romão da Silva	Brazil	9:05.31	
3rd place, bronze medalist(s)	Octavio Guadarrama	Mexico	9:15.00	
4	Bryan Stride	Canada	9:24.46	
5	Randy Lussenden	United States	9:29.32	
6	José Cobo	Cuba	9:34.46	
7	Sixto Hierrezuelo	Cuba	9:40.52	
8	Modesto Comprés	Dominican Republic	9:40.59	
9	Hipólito López	Honduras	10:12.00	
10	Luis Raudales	Honduras	10:36.74	
	Graham Hutchison	Canada	DNF	
