= Lanzoni =

Lanzoni is an Italian surname which can refer to the following people:

- Fabio Lanzoni (born 1959), Italian male fashion model and actor.
- Matteo Lanzoni (born 1988), Italian professional football player.
- Ronald Lanzoni (born 1959), Costa Rican long-distance runner.
