= Carlos Martínez (Mexican runner) =

Personal information
- Born: Carlos Martínez de Anda; 1950
- Died: 31 December 2013

Sport
- Sport: Middle-distance running
- Events: 800 m, 1500 m, 3000 m steeplechase

Carlos Martínez de Anda (1950 – 31 December 2013) was a Mexican middle-distance runner. He won several medals at regional level including two at the 1975 Pan American Games.

== International competitions ==
| Year | Competition | Venue | Position | Event | Notes |
Representing Mexico
| 1969 | Central American and Caribbean Championships | Havana, Cuba | 3rd | 800 m | 1:53.2 |
| 1969 | Central American and Caribbean Championships | Havana, Cuba | 2nd | 1500 m | 3:53.2 |
| 1971 | Central American and Caribbean Championships | Kingston, Jamaica | 3rd | 1500 m | 3:48.2 |
| 1974 | Central American and Caribbean Games | Santo Domingo, Dominican Republic | 3rd | 1500 m | 3:44.90 |
| 1974 | Central American and Caribbean Games | Santo Domingo, Dominican Republic | 6th | 4 × 400 m relay | 3:18.98 |
| 1975 | Central American and Caribbean Championships | Ponce, Puerto Rico | 1st | 1500 m | 3:45.9 |
| 1975 | Central American and Caribbean Championships | Ponce, Puerto Rico | 3rd | 5000 m | 15:19.0 |
| 1975 | Pan American Games | Mexico City, Mexico | 3rd | 800 m | 1:48.78 |
| 1975 | Pan American Games | Mexico City, Mexico | 2nd | 1500 m | 3:45.98 |
| 1977 | Central American and Caribbean Championships | Xalapa, Mexico | 1st | 3000 m s'chase | 8:51.0 |
| 1977 | World Cup | Düsseldorf, West Germany | 7th | 3000 m s'chase | 8:58.7^{1} |
| 1978 | Central American and Caribbean Games | Medellín, Colombia | 2nd | 3000 m s'chase | 8:52.13 |

^{1}Representing the Americas

== Personal bests ==
- 800 metres – 1:48
- 1500 metres – 3:44
