= Luis Medina (athlete) =

Cuban runner (born 1952)

Personal information
- Born: June 21, 1952 (age 74)
Medal record
Men's Athletics
Representing Cuba
Pan American Games
Gold medal – first place	1975 Mexico City	800 metres
Central American and Caribbean Games
Gold medal – first place	1974 Santo Domingo	1500 metres
Gold medal – first place	1978 Medellín	1500 metres
Silver medal – second place	1982 Havana	1500 metres
Silver medal – second place	1982 Havana	5000 metres

Luis Medina Montoya (born June 21, 1952) is a retired middle-distance runner from Cuba, who represented his native country at the 1976 Summer Olympics in Montreal, Quebec, Canada. He is best known for winning the gold medal in the men's 800 metres event at the 1975 Pan American Games in Mexico City, Mexico.

== International competitions ==
Year	Competition	Venue	Position	Event	Notes
Representing Cuba
1973	Central American and Caribbean Championships	Maracaibo, Venezuela	2nd	800 m	1:49.8
1973	Universiade	Moscow, Soviet Union	22nd (h)	800 m	1:52.5
1974	Central American and Caribbean Games	Santo Domingo, Dominican Republic	2nd	800 m	1:48.68
1974	Central American and Caribbean Games	Santo Domingo, Dominican Republic	1st	1500 m	3:44.18
1975	Pan American Games	Mexico City, Mexico	1st	800 m	1:47.98
1975	Pan American Games	Mexico City, Mexico	3rd	1500 m	3:49.84
1976	Olympic Games	Montreal, Canada	32nd (h)	800 m	1:50.15
1976	Olympic Games	Montreal, Canada	23rd (h)	1500 m	3:42.71
1977	Central American and Caribbean Championships	Xalapa, Mexico	1st	1500 m	3:46.71
1977	Universiade	Sofia, Bulgaria	4th	1500 m	3:41.4
1978	Central American and Caribbean Games	Medellín, Colombia	1st	1500 m	3:44.47
1979	Pan American Games	San Juan, Puerto Rico	4th (h)	1500 m	3:45.6^{1}
1981	Central American and Caribbean Championships	Santo Domingo, Dominican Republic	3rd	1500 m	3:44.10
1982	Central American and Caribbean Games	Havana, Cuba	2nd	1500 m	3:41.92
1982	Central American and Caribbean Games	Havana, Cuba	2nd	5000 m	14:24.81

^{1}Did not start in the final
