= Athletics at the 1975 Summer Universiade – Men's 5000 metres =

The men's 5000 metres event at the 1975 Summer Universiade was held at the Stadio Olimpico in Rome on 21 September.

== Results ==
| Rank | Athlete | Nationality | Time | Notes |
|---|---|---|---|---|
| 1st place, gold medalist(s) | Franco Fava | Italy | 13:37.56 | UR |
| 2nd place, silver medalist(s) | Ilie Floroiu | Romania | 13:39.20 | |
| 3rd place, bronze medalist(s) | Julian Goater | Great Britain | 13:42.02 | |
| 4 | Vlastimil Zwiefelhofer | Czechoslovakia | 13:49.09 | |
| 5 | Karl Mann | West Germany | 13:49.50 | |
| 6 | Jean-Michel Charbonell | France | 13:51.72 | |
| 7 | Venanzio Ortiz | Italy | 13:58.48 | |
| 8 | Józef Ziubrak | Poland | 13:59.21 | |
| 9 | Louis Groarke | Canada | 14:03.48 | |
| 10 | Wiesław Watras | Poland | 14:05.36 | |
| 11 | Ricardo Ortega | Spain | 14:06.31 | |
| 12 | Yvan Naessens | Belgium | 14:06.52 | |
| 13 | Anatoliy Nedybalyuk | Soviet Union | 14:07.74 | |
| 14 | Dušan Janićijević | Yugoslavia | 14:07.74 | |
| 16 | Patrick Bethegnies | France | 14:13.79 | |
| 17 | Matti Salonen | Finland | 14:24.39 | |
| 18 | Eloy Schleder | Brazil | 14:25.35 | |
| 19 | Ray Smedley | Great Britain | 14:30.66 | |
| 20 | Anton Gorbunow | West Germany | 14:37.25 | |
| 21 | Walter Fähndrich | Switzerland | 14:51.48 | |
| 22 | Luis Raudales | Honduras | 15:23.85 | |
| 23 | Michel Ngouamandji | Central African Republic | 16:27.35 | |
