= Ivo Rodrigues =

Ivo Rodrigues is the name of

- Ivo Rodrigues (runner) (born 1960), Brazilian long-distance runner
- Ivo Rodrigues (footballer) (born 1995), Portuguese footballer
