= Athletics at the 1975 Pan American Games – Men's 5000 metres =

Men's 5000 metres at the Pan American Games

The men's 5000 metres event at the 1975 Pan American Games was held in Mexico City on 16 October.

== Results ==
Rank	Name	Nationality	Time	Notes
1st place, gold medalist(s)	Domingo Tibaduiza	Colombia	14:02.00	
2nd place, silver medalist(s)	Theodore Castaneda	United States	14:03.20	
3rd place, bronze medalist(s)	Rodolfo Gómez	Mexico	14:05.25	
4	Luis Hernández	Mexico	14:21.59	
5	José Romão da Silva	Brazil	14:41.36	
6	Edmundo Warnke	Chile	15:10.66	
7	Mike Slack	United States	15:17.32	
8	Sixto Hierrezuelo	Cuba	15:32.59	
9	Hipólito López	Honduras	15:56.16	
10	John Sharp	Canada	16:01.57	
11	Luis Raudales	Honduras	16:20.96	
