= Athletics at the 1977 Summer Universiade – Men's 1500 metres =

The men's 1500 metres event at the 1977 Summer Universiade was held at the Vasil Levski National Stadium in Sofia on 22 and 23 August.

== Medalists ==
Gold	Silver	Bronze
Jozef Plachý; Czechoslovakia	Mike Kearns; Great Britain	Abderrahmane Morceli; Algeria

== Results ==
=== Heats ===
Rank	Heat	Athlete	Nationality	Time	Notes
1	1	Juhani Sams	Finland	3:40.6	Q
2	1	Luis Medina	Cuba	3:41.0	Q
3	1	Paul Lawther	Great Britain	3:41.3	q
4	1	Vladimir Yerokhin	Soviet Union	3:42.6	q
5	1	Steve Lacy	United States	3:45.4	
6	1	Imre Ötvös	Hungary	3:46.1	
7	1	Toshifumi Shigenari	Japan	3:47.3	
8	1	Ignacio Melesio	Mexico	3:49.6	
9	1	Majid Abdi	Tunisia	4:02.4	
10	1	K. P. Chandrosona	Sri Lanka	4:10.1	
1	2	Jozef Plachý	Czechoslovakia	3:41.8	Q
2	2	Abderrahmane Morceli	Algeria	3:41.8	Q
3	2	Harald Hudak	West Germany	3:42.2	q
4	2	Valeriy Abramov	Soviet Union	3:43.6	q
5	2	Gheorghe Ghipu	Romania	3:46.6	
6	2	Gabriele Ferrero	Italy	3:49.6	
7	2	Klaas Lok	Netherlands	3:50.9	
8	2	Takashi Ishii	Japan	3:52.4	
9	2	Babacar Niang	Senegal	3:54.3	
10	2	Samuel Nyariki	Kenya	3:55.9	
1	3	Klaus-Peter Weippert	East Germany	3:46.1	Q
2	3	Vladimir Kanev	Bulgaria	3:46.1	Q
3	3	Henryk Wasilewski	Poland	3:46.2	
4	3	Joost Borm	Netherlands	3:47.3	
5	3	Francisco Gordillo	Spain	3:49.3	
6	3	Tzvi Dauber	Israel	3:52.4	
7	3	José Gómez	Mexico	3:57.0	
8	3	Leonardo Sorbello	Italy	4:01.8	
9	3	Abera Asres	Ethiopia	4:12.0	
1	4	Mike Kearns	Great Britain	3:46.6	Q
2	4	Michael Lederer	West Germany	3:46.9	Q
3	4	Amar Brahmia	Algeria	3:47.9	
4	4	Dimitar Minchev	Bulgaria	3:49.5	
5	4	Imre Nagy	Hungary	3:49.8	
6	4	Peter Spir	Canada	3:55.1	
7	4	Jamie Botten	Australia	3:58.4	
8	4	Mohsen Ouerfelli	Tunisia	3:59.2	
9	4	Karl Schönenberger	Switzerland	4:13.8	
10	4	Edwin Attard	Malta	4:14.5	

=== Final ===
Rank	Athlete	Nationality	Time	Notes
1st place, gold medalist(s)	Jozef Plachý	Czechoslovakia	3:40.2	
2nd place, silver medalist(s)	Mike Kearns	Great Britain	3:40.9	
3rd place, bronze medalist(s)	Abderrahmane Morceli	Algeria	3:41.0	
4	Luis Medina	Cuba	3:41.4	
5	Juhani Sams	Finland	3:41.5	
6	Klaus-Peter Weippert	East Germany	3:41.5	
7	Vladimir Yerokhin	Soviet Union	3:41.7	
8	Paul Lawther	Great Britain	3:41.8	
9	Valeriy Abramov	Soviet Union	3:42.0	
10	Vladimir Kanev	Bulgaria	3:42.3	
11	Harald Hudak	West Germany	3:47.8	
12	Michael Lederer	West Germany	3:56.0	
