= Athletics at the 1983 Pan American Games – Men's marathon =

Men's marathon at the Pan American Games

The men's marathon event at the 1983 Pan American Games was held in Caracas, Venezuela on 28 August.

== Results ==
Rank	Name	Nationality	Time	Notes
1st place, gold medalist(s)	Jorge González	Puerto Rico	2:12:43	NR
2nd place, silver medalist(s)	César Mercado	Puerto Rico	2:20:30	
3rd place, bronze medalist(s)	Miguel Cruz	Mexico	2:21:12	
4	Armando Azócar	Venezuela	2:21:30	
5	Luis Bautista	Venezuela	2:22:35	
6	Rafael Parra	Colombia	2:22:51	
7	Manuel García	Mexico	2:24:35	
8	Michael Feurtado	Jamaica	2:26:29	
9	Damian Rivera	Panama	2:37:46	
10	Raúl Llusá	Argentina	2:39:23	
11	Moses Ranghell	Trinidad and Tobago	2:45:41	
12	Serafin Álvarez	Panama	2:45:57	
	Mike Layman	United States	DNF	
	David Hinz	United States	DNF	
	Mike Dyon	Canada	DNF	
	Radamés González	Cuba	DNF	
