= Todd Harbour =

American middle-distance runner

Personal information
- Born: March 24, 1959 (age 67)
- Home town: Port Isabel, Texas, U.S.

Sport
- Sport: Athletics
- Event: 800 metres – 5000 metres
- College team: Baylor Bears
- Club: Nike

Achievements and titles
- Highest world ranking: 9 (1982)
- Personal bests: Outdoor; 800 m: 1:47.22 (Helsinki 1980); 1500 m: 3:33.99 (Zürich 1982); Mile: 3:50.34 (Oslo 1981); 2000 m: 4:59.28 (Nice 1982); 5000 m: 13:30.57 (Walnut, California 1984); Indoor; Mile: 3:56.48 (East Rutherford 1983); Two miles: 8:35.05 (Los Angeles 1985)
Medal record
Men's Athletics
Representing the United States
Pan American Games
Silver medal – second place	1979 San Juan	1500 metres

Todd Harbour (born March 24, 1959) is an American retired middle and long-distance runner.

== Career ==
Harbour competed collegiately for Baylor University, and later was the head track and field and cross-country coach at for 22 years, before retiring in 2021. In 1979, he won a silver medal in the 1500 metres at the Pan American Games in San Juan, Puerto Rico. He currently holds the collegiate record in the outdoor mile, when he ran 3:50.34 in Oslo in 1981 during his senior year. During college, he was also a five-time All-American and won eight individual Southwest Conference titles. Harbour was inducted into the Baylor Athletic Hall of Fame, the Southwest Conference Hall of Fame and the Rio Grande Valley Hall of Fame. He competed professionally for Nike from 1981 to 1987, and ran 54 sub-4-minute miles during his career.
