= Elói Schleder =

Brazilian long-distance runner

Personal information
- Born: July 26, 1951 Passo Fundo, Brazil
- Died: August 31, 2025 (aged 74) São Paulo, Brazil

Sport
- Sport: Marathon running

Eloi Rodrigues Schleder (July 26, 1951 – 31 August 2025) was a former long-distance runner from Brazil, who represented his native country in the men's marathon at the 1984 Summer Olympics. There he finished in 23rd position, clocking 2:16:35.

== International competitions ==
Year	Competition	Venue	Position	Event	Notes
Representing Brazil
1974	South American Championships	Santiago, Chile	8th	5000 m	14:47.2
1975	South American Championships	Rio de Janeiro, Brazil	4th	5000 m	14:20.6
1975	Universiade	Rome, Italy	18th	5000 m	14:25.35
1975	Universiade	Rome, Italy	6th	10,000 m	29:57.81
1977	South American Championships	Montevideo, Uruguay	3rd	Marathon	2:26:48
1979	Pan American Games	San Juan, Puerto Rico	7th	10,000 m	29:35.6
1979	Pan American Games	San Juan, Puerto Rico	9th	Marathon	2:29:42
1979	South American Championships	Bucaramanga, Colombia	4th	Marathon†	2:00:23
1979	South American Championships	Bucaramanga, Colombia	2nd	3000 m s'chase	8:57.4
1981	Frankfurt Marathon	Frankfurt, West Germany	3rd	Marathon	2:14:54
1981	South American Championships	La Paz, Bolivia	3rd	3000 m s'chase	10:19.8
1982	Sao Paulo Marathon	Sao Paulo, Brazil	1st	Marathon	2:15:08
1982	Frankfurt Marathon	Frankfurt, West Germany	2nd	Marathon	2:13:08
1984	Olympic Games	Los Angeles, United States	23rd	Marathon	2:16:35
1985	World Marathon Cup	Hiroshima, Japan	51st	Marathon	2:16:46
1985	South American Championships	Santiago, Chile	1st	Marathon	2:22:13
1986	Australian Marathon Championship	Sydney, Australia	1st	Marathon	2:12:54

† Short course

== Personal bests ==
- 3000 metres steeplechase – 8:43.86 (Florence 1981)
- Marathon – 2:12:54 (Sydney 1986)
