= Enn Sellik =

Estonian long-distance runner

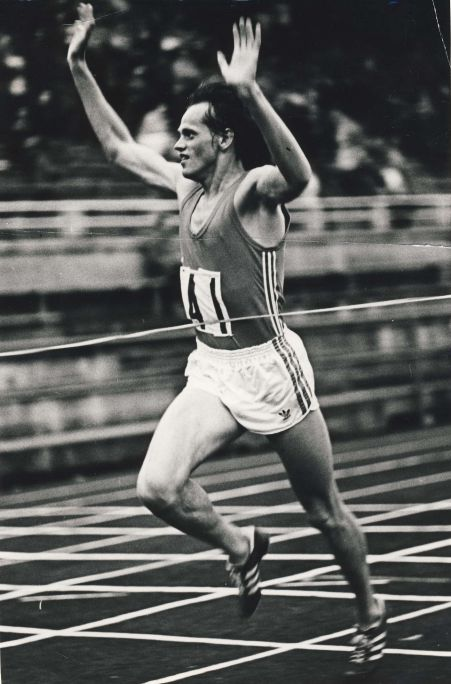
- Sellik in 1976

Personal information
- Born: 10 December 1954 (age 71) Iisaku Parish, then part of Estonian SSR, Soviet Union
- Height: 1.76 m (5 ft 9 in)
- Weight: 62 kg (137 lb)

Sport
- Country: Estonia Soviet Union

Achievements and titles
- Personal bests: 5000 m: 13:17.2 NR (Podolsk 1976); 10 000 m: 27:40.61 NR (Prague 1978)
Medal record
Men's athletics
Representing Soviet Union
Summer Universiade
Gold medal – first place	1977 Sofia	5000 m

Enn Sellik (born 10 December 1954) is an Estonian former long-distance runner who competed, representing Soviet Union in the 1976 Summer Olympics and in the 1980 Summer Olympics.

He set his personal best in 10,000m run at the European championships in Prague in 1978, which still stands for the Estonian national record. His best in 5,000 metres run (13:17.2), achieved in Podolsk in 1976, is also counted as the current Estonian record.
