= 1982 Berlin Marathon =

9th running of the marathon

9th Berlin Marathon
- Venue: Berlin, West Germany
- Date: 26 September

Champions
- Men: Domingo Tibaduiza (2:14:47)
- Women: Jean Lochhead (2:40:32)
- Wheelchair men: Bo Lindquist (2:03:10)

The 1982 Berlin Marathon was the 9th running of the annual marathon race held in Berlin, West Germany, held on 26 September. Colombia's Domingo Tibaduiza won the men's race in 2:14:47 hours, while the women's race was won by Britain's Jean Lochhead in 2:47:05. Tibaduiza was the first non-European winner of the race and Lochhead was the first non-German women's winner. Sweden's Bo Lindquist won the men's wheelchair race in a time of 2:03:10. No women entered the wheelchair section. A total of 3448 runners finished the race, comprising 3318 men and 130 women.

== Results ==
=== Men ===
Rank	Athlete	Nationality	Time
1st place, gold medalist(s)	Domingo Tibaduiza	Colombia	2:14:46
2nd place, silver medalist(s)	Eberhardt Weyel	West Germany	2:14:50
3rd place, bronze medalist(s)	John Offord	United Kingdom	2:20:34
4	Ryszard Misiewicz	Poland	2:20:41
5	Martin McCarthy	United Kingdom	2:21:00
6	Robert Sinclair	United Kingdom	2:22:35
7	Michael Crowl	West Germany	2:24:18
8	Ken Barber	West Germany	2:25:06
9	Ulrich Mattersburger	West Germany	2:25:07
10	Wilfried Jackisch	West Germany	2:25:58
11	Gerhard Krippner	West Germany	2:27:17
12	Kurt Herbicht	West Germany	2:27:42
13	Roman Herl	West Germany	2:28:02
14	Manfred Walter	West Germany	2:28:43
15	Karl-Age Soeltoft	West Germany	2:28:48
16	Peter Frederiksson	West Germany	2:28:58
17	Ralf Petersen	West Germany	2:29:26
18	Michael Meyer-Beer	West Germany	2:30:14
19	Michael Heine	West Germany	2:30:47
20	William Venus	West Germany	2:31:02

=== Women ===
Rank	Athlete	Nationality	Time
1st place, gold medalist(s)	Jean Lochhead	United Kingdom	2:47:05
2nd place, silver medalist(s)	Libby Pfeiffer	United Kingdom	2:47:28
3rd place, bronze medalist(s)	Liane Winter	West Germany	2:51:53
4	Carolyn Clanckmeicter	West Germany	3:03:30
5	Jutta von Haase	West Germany	3:05:32
