= José Cobo =

Cuban athlete

Personal information
- Full name: José Luis Cobo Valdés
- Born: 28 January 1951 (age 75)

Sport
- Sport: Athletics
- Event: 3000 m steeplechase
Medal record
Representing Cuba
Central American and Caribbean Games
Gold medal – first place	1974 Santo Domingo	3000m steeplechase
Gold medal – first place	1978 Medellin	3000m steeplechase
Gold medal – first place	1982 Havana	3000m steeplechase

José Luis Cobo Valdés (Note: In this Spanish name, the first or paternal surname is Cobo and the second or maternal family name is Valdés.) (born 28 January 1951) is a retired Cuban athlete who specialised in the 3000 metres steeplechase. He won multiple medals at regional level.

== International competitions ==
Year	Competition	Venue	Position	Event	Notes
Representing Cuba
1970	Central American and Caribbean Games	Panama City, Panama	8th	1500 m	3:52.4
1970	Central American and Caribbean Games	Panama City, Panama	6th	3000 m s'chase	9:18.0
1971	Central American and Caribbean Championships	Kingston, Jamaica	3rd	3000 m s'chase	9:11.6
1971	Pan American Games	Cali, Colombia	8th	3000 m s'chase	9:06.79
1973	Universiade	Moscow, Soviet Union	9th (h)	1500 m	3:45.4
1974	Central American and Caribbean Games	Santo Domingo, Dominican Republic	5th	1500 m	3:45.43
1974	Central American and Caribbean Games	Santo Domingo, Dominican Republic	1st	3000 m s'chase	8:50.8
1975	Pan American Games	Mexico City, Mexico	6th	1500 m	3:52.37
1975	Pan American Games	Mexico City, Mexico	6th	3000 m s'chase	9:34.46
1977	Central American and Caribbean Championships	Xalapa, Mexico	2nd	3000 m s'chase	9:01.1
1978	Central American and Caribbean Games	Medellín, Colombia	1st	3000 m s'chase	8:46.39
1979	Pan American Games	San Juan, Puerto Rico	10th	5000 m	15:00.5
1979	Pan American Games	San Juan, Puerto Rico	4th	3000 m s'chase	9:01.6
1981	Central American and Caribbean Championships	Santo Domingo, Dominican Republic	3rd	3000 m s'chase	8:53.97
1982	Central American and Caribbean Games	Havana, Cuba	1st	3000 m s'chase	8:49.52
1983	Central American and Caribbean Championships	Havana, Cuba	3rd	3000 m s'chase	8:55.70

== Personal bests ==
- 1500 metres – 3:41.6h (Bratislava 1974)
- 3000 metres steeplechase – 8:32.9h (Prague 1977)
