= William Aguirre =

Nicaraguan long-distance runner

Personal information
- Full name: William Duilio Aguirre Villaviconcio
- Nationality: Nicaraguan
- Born: 27 December 1962 (age 63)
- Height: 1.73 m (5 ft 8 in)
- Weight: 65 kg (143 lb)

Sport
- Sport: Long-distance running
- Event: Marathon
Medal record
Representing Nicaragua
Central American Games
Gold medal – first place	1990 Tegucigalpa	Marathon
Gold medal – first place	1994 San Salvador	Marathon
Bronze medal – third place	1997 San Pedro Sula	10,000m

William Duilio Aguirre Villaviconcio (born 27 December 1962) is a Nicaraguan long-distance runner. He competed in the men's marathon at the 1992 Summer Olympics and the 1996 Summer Olympics.

== International competitions ==
Year	Competition	Venue	Position	Event	Notes
Representing Nicaragua
1982	Central American and Caribbean Games	Havana, Cuba	8th	5000 m	15:16.44
1982	Central American and Caribbean Games	Havana, Cuba	7th	10,000 m	32:25.68
1983	Pan American Games	Caracas, Venezuela	13th	5000 m	15:50.44
1983	Pan American Games	Caracas, Venezuela	13th	10,000 m	32:52.43
1983	Ibero-American Championships	Barcelona, Spain	5th	5000 m	15:30.50
1983	Ibero-American Championships	Barcelona, Spain	3rd	10,000 m	32:02.42
1986	Ibero-American Championships	Havana, Cuba	9th	10,000 m	31:32.63
1987	World Championships	Rome, Italy	33rd	Marathon	2:27:19
1990	Central American Games	Tegucigalpa, Honduras	1st	Marathon	2:30:39
1990	Central American and Caribbean Games	Mexico City, Mexico	8th	Marathon	2:29:32
1991	Pan American Games	Havana, Cuba	8th	Marathon	2:29:20
1991	World Championships	Tokyo, Japan	28th	Marathon	2:29:35
1992	Olympic Games	Barcelona, Spain	73rd	Marathon	2:34:18
1994	Central American Games	San Salvador, El Salvador	1st	Marathon	2:32:03
1995	World Championships	Gothenburg, Sweden	42nd	Marathon	2:29:54
1996	Olympic Games	Los Angeles, United States	99th	Marathon	2:37:02
1997	Central American Games	San Pedro Sula, Honduras	3rd	10,000 m	33:34.62
1998	Central American and Caribbean Games	Maracaibo, Venezuela	8th	Marathon	2:40:05

== Personal bests ==
- 5000 metres – 14:46.5 (Havana 1989)
- 10,000 metres – 30:25.25 (Havana 1989)
- Marathon – 2:20:39 (Tegucigalpa 1990)
