= Antonio Villanueva =

Personal information
- Nationality: Mexican
- Born: 25 June 1940 (age 85)

Sport
- Sport: Long-distance running
- Event(s): Marathon, 3000 m steeplechase

Antonio Villanueva (born 25 June 1940) is a retired Mexican steeplechase and long-distance runner. He won several medals at the regional level. In addition, he represented his country in the marathon at the inaugural World Championships in Helsinki however he did not finish the race.

== International competitions ==
Year	Competition	Venue	Position	Event	Notes
Representing Mexico
1970	Central American and Caribbean Games	Panama City, Panama	2nd	3000 m s'chase	8:53.4
1971	Pan American Games	Cali, Colombia	3rd	3000 m s'chase	8:46.09
1973	Central American and Caribbean Championships	Maracaibo, Venezuela	1st	3000 m s'chase	8:49.4
1974	Central American and Caribbean Games	Santo Domingo, Dominican Republic	2nd	3000 m s'chase	8:52.0
1983	World Championships	Helsinki, Finland	–	Marathon	DNF

== Personal bests ==
- 10,000 metres – 28:50.6 (Seattle 1972)
- Marathon – 2:13:41 (Eugene 1982)
- 3000 metres steeplechase – 8:37.0 (Bakersfield 1973)
