= Athletics at the 1983 Pan American Games – Men's 5000 metres =

Men's 5000 metres at the 1983 Pan American Games
- Location: Caracas, Venezuela
- Date: 28 August
- Competitors: 15 from 11 nations
- Winning time: 13:54.11

Medalists
gold medal	Eduardo Castro	Mexico
silver medal	Gerardo Alcalá	Mexico
bronze medal	Domingo Tibaduiza	Colombia

The men's 5000 metres event at the 1983 Pan American Games was held in Caracas, Venezuela on 28 August.

== Results ==
Rank	Name	Nationality	Time	Notes
1st place, gold medalist(s)	Eduardo Castro	Mexico	13:54.11	
2nd place, silver medalist(s)	Gerardo Alcalá	Mexico	13:54.37	
3rd place, bronze medalist(s)	Domingo Tibaduiza	Colombia	13:59.68	
4	José da Silva	Brazil	14:08.02	
5	Don Clary	United States	14:09.07	
6	Germán Peña	Colombia	14:17.53	
7	Omar Aguilar	Chile	14:27.68	
8	Chris Fox	United States	14:33.50	
9	Ricardo Vera	Uruguay	14:34.57	
10	Greg Duhaime	Canada	14:40.07	
11	Víctor Maldonado	Venezuela	14:57.96	
12	Ramón López	Paraguay	15:20.77	
13	William Aguirre	Nicaragua	15:50.44	
14	Tyrone Thibou	Antigua and Barbuda	17:44.93	
	Eduardo Navas	Venezuela	DNF	
