= Eduardo Castro =

Eduardo Castro Almanza (born May 1, 1954) is a retired long-distance runner from Mexico, who won several medals during the early 1980s.

== Achievements ==
Year	Competition	Venue	Position	Event	Notes
Representing Mexico
1977	Central American and Caribbean Championships	Xalapa, Mexico	3rd	800 m	1:49.53
1977	Central American and Caribbean Championships	Xalapa, Mexico	2nd	1500 m	3:48.47
1978	Central American and Caribbean Games	Medellín, Colombia	5th	800 m	1:48.58
1978	Central American and Caribbean Games	Medellín, Colombia	2nd	1500 m	3:45.14
1979	Central American and Caribbean Championships	Guadalajara, Mexico	2nd	800 m	1:48.3
1979	Pan American Games	San Juan, Puerto Rico	4th	1500 m	3:42.1
1981	Central American and Caribbean Championships	Santo Domingo, Dominican Republic	1st	1500 m	3:43.30
1981	Central American and Caribbean Championships	Santo Domingo, Dominican Republic	1st	5000 m	14:08.88
1982	Central American and Caribbean Games	Havana, Cuba	1st	1500 m	3:41.84
1982	Central American and Caribbean Games	Havana, Cuba	1st	5000 m	14:11.05
1983	Pan American Games	Caracas, Venezuela	4th	1500 m	3:44.76
1983	Pan American Games	Caracas, Venezuela	1st	5000 m	13:54.11
1984	Olympic Games	Los Angeles, United States	17th (sf)	5000 m	13:42.04
