= Luis Tipán =

Ecuadorian long-distance runner

Personal information
- Full name: Luis Alfonso Tipán
- Born: February 8, 1954 (age 72)

Sport
- Country: Ecuador
- Sport: Men's athletics

Achievements and titles
- Olympic finals: 1984 Summer Olympics
Medal record
Men's athletics
Representing Ecuador
South American Games
Gold medal – first place	1978 La Paz	10,000 m
Silver medal – second place	1978 La Paz	5000 m
Silver medal – second place	1978 La Paz	3000 m steeplechase
Silver medal – second place	1982 Santa Fe	10,000 m
Silver medal – second place	1982 Santa Fe	Marathon
Bolivarian Games
Gold medal – first place	1977 La Paz	10,000 m
Gold medal – first place	1977 La Paz	Half marathon
Silver medal – second place	1981 Barquisimeto	10,000 m
Bronze medal – third place	1977 La Paz	5000 m

Luis Alfonso Tipán (born February 8, 1954) is a retired male athlete from Ecuador, who competed in the long-distance running events during his career.

He represented his native South American country at the 1984 Summer Olympics in Los Angeles, California. Tipán set his personal best (2:28:30) in the men's marathon on August 14, 1983 in Helsinki, Finland.

== International competitions ==
Year	Competition	Venue	Position	Event	Notes
Representing Ecuador
1972	South American Junior Championships	Asunción, Paraguay	2nd	3000 m	9:05.2
1975	South American Championships	Rio de Janeiro, Brazil	6th	5000 m	14:53.8
1975	South American Championships	Rio de Janeiro, Brazil	6th	10,000 m	30:46.4
1977	Bolivarian Games	La Paz, Bolivia	3rd	5000 m	15:50.2 A
1977	Bolivarian Games	La Paz, Bolivia	1st	10,000 m	32:24.77 A
1977	Bolivarian Games	La Paz, Bolivia	1st	Half marathon	1:12:02 A
1978	Southern Cross Games	La Paz, Bolivia	2nd	5000 m	15:56.54
1978	Southern Cross Games	La Paz, Bolivia	1st	10,000 m	33:28.14 A
1978	Southern Cross Games	La Paz, Bolivia	2nd	3000 m s'chase	10:07.39
1979	Pan American Games	San Juan, Puerto Rico	9th	5000 m	14:29.1
1979	Pan American Games	San Juan, Puerto Rico	9th	10,000 m	30:15.1
1981	South American Championships	La Paz, Bolivia	5th	3000 m s'chase	10:29.4
1981	Bolivarian Games	Barquisimeto, Venezuela	2nd	10,000 m	30:09.93
1982	Southern Cross Games	Santa Fe, Argentina	2nd	10,000 m	29:47.0
1982	Southern Cross Games	Santa Fe, Argentina	2nd	Marathon	2:27:00
1983	World Championships	Helsinki, Finland	53rd	Marathon	2:28:30
1984	Olympic Games	Los Angeles, United States	46th (h)	5000 m	14:52.43
1984	Olympic Games	Los Angeles, United States	34th (h)	10,000 m	30:07.49
