= Athletics at the 1975 Pan American Games – Men's 1500 metres =

Men's 1500 metres at the Pan American Games

The men's 1500 metres event at the 1975 Pan American Games was held in Mexico City on 18 and 20 October.

== Medalists ==
Gold	Silver	Bronze
Tony Waldrop; United States	Carlos Martínez; Mexico	Luis Medina; Cuba

== Results ==
=== Heats ===
Rank	Heat	Name	Nationality	Time	Notes
1	1	Carlos Martínez	Mexico	3:55.55	Q
2	1	Kenneth Elmer	Canada	3:55.99	Q
3	1	Jesús Barrero	Colombia	3:57.65	Q
4	1	Luis Medina	Cuba	3:58.70	Q
5	1	Scott Daggett	United States	3:59.39	Q
6	2	Tony Waldrop	United States	4:01.18	Q
7	2	Carlos Báez	Puerto Rico	4:01.20	Q
8	2	José Cobo	Cuba	4:01.23	Q
9	2	Paul Pearson	Canada	4:02.37	Q
10	2	Carlos Villar	Argentina	4:02.41	Q
11	2	Javier Chávez	Mexico	4:02.69	Q
12	1	Modesto Comprés	Dominican Republic	4:03.11	Q
13	2	Darcy Pereira	Brazil	4:05.04	
14	1	Michael Watson	Bermuda	4:09.85	
15	1	Olmeus Charles	Haiti	4:48.49	
	1	Sylvan Barrett	Jamaica	DNF	

=== Final ===
Rank	Name	Nationality	Time	Notes
1st place, gold medalist(s)	Tony Waldrop	United States	3:45.09	
2nd place, silver medalist(s)	Carlos Martínez	Mexico	3:45.98	
3rd place, bronze medalist(s)	Luis Medina	Cuba	3:49.84	
4	Modesto Comprés	Dominican Republic	3:52.14	
5	Javier Chávez	Mexico	3:52.35	
6	José Cobo	Cuba	3:52.37	
7	Carlos Báez	Puerto Rico	3:54.81	
8	Kenneth Elmer	Canada	3:55.00	
9	Carlos Villar	Argentina	4:03.35	
10	Scott Daggett	United States	4:07.34	
11	Paul Pearson	Canada	4:15.90	
	Jesús Barrero	Colombia	DNF	
