= Manila Marathon =

Annual race in Metro Manila, Philippines

- Date: 12th of June (Philippine Independence Day)
- Location: Metro Manila, Philippines
- Event type: Road
- Distance: Marathon, Half marathon, 10K run, 5K run
- Primary sponsor: Samsung
- Established: 1982 (44 years ago)
- Organizer: Runrio Inc.
- Course records: Men's: 2:30:10 (2025) (Philippines) Eduard Flores; Women's: 2:55:34 (2025) (Philippines) Christine Hallasgo
- Website: manilamarathon.ph
- Participants: 25,000 (2026)

Manila Marathon is an annual marathon race held in Metro Manila, Philippines. It is part of the Philippine Marathon Majors, a series of races in the country sanctioned by the Philippine Athletics Track and Field Association and World Athletics. The marathon route is measured and certified by the Association of International Marathons and Distance Races (AIMS), making finish times valid for qualifying for elite majors like Boston or London.

In 2026, the race organizer announced the plan to shift the track from its usual in the Mall of Asia Complex to the city's main artery, the historic EDSA, in a bid to secure a formal World Athletics label for the race. The announcement drew criticism, particularly for the plan to use the lane used by EDSA Carousel, the bus rapid transit system along EDSA.

== History ==
=== Origins ===
The modern iteration of Manila Marathon traces its lineage to the original Manila International Marathon in 1982 which was then-organized by the Philippine Government. The inaugural edition was participated by local and international runners, and was won by two-time Olympic Champion Waldemar Cierpinski. In that year, Cierpinski set the race record of 2:14:27.

=== Fragmentation and Institutional Shifts (1998–2023) ===
Following the peak of the original government-sponsored era, the event entered a period of organizational inconsistency. Between the late 1990s and the early 2020s, the "Manila Marathon" name was utilized by various private entities and sponsors, most notably Philippine Airlines. The race was not held annually, often skipping years or changing dates and organizers, which prevented it from maintaining active international certifications like AIMS or World Athletics labels.

During this period, local athletes also shifted focus to the National MILO Marathon, which became the primary qualifier for Filipino elite athletes. This era saw the split between the legacy groups who continued the Manila International Marathon name and the modern commercial organizers.

=== Revitalization (2024–present) ===
In 2024, the event underwent a major revitalization under the management of Runrio Inc., led by Rio de la Cruz. This transition marked the formal shift toward the Manila Marathon brand. Unlike the decentralized races of the previous two decades, the 2024 iteration secured formal sanctioning from PATAFA and World Athletics.

The race also moved its primary hub to the SM Mall of Asia complex before introducing the historic Epifanio de los Santos Avenue (EDSA) route in 2026, aiming to align the event with the standards of the World Marathon Majors. The inaugural race in the new EDSA loop route was won by Allan Arbois Jr. and Jewel de Luna. A total of 25,000 runners participated across all distances.

== Past winners ==
Key: Course record

=== Manila International Marathon ===
Ed.	Year	Men's winner	Time	Women's winner	Time
1	1982	Waldemar Cierpinski (GDR)	2:14:39	No data available	—
2	1983	Domingo Tibaduiza (COL)	2:25:01	Moty Koppes (NED)	3:13:24
3	1984	Douglas Curtis (USA)	2:28:16	Connie Pflanz (CAN)	3:16:31
4	1985	Jose Reveyn (BEL)	2:21:11	Denise Verhaert (BEL)	2:48:39
5	1986	Eddie Hallebuyek (BEL)	—	Tani Ruckle (CAN)	2:46:58
6	1987	Alain Lazare (FRA)	2:22:13	Doris Schlosser (FRG)	2:52:36
7	1988	Johan Geimart (BEL)	2:25:22	Maria Alda Manzone (ITA)	2:48:49
8	1989	Osmiro Souza da Silva (BRA)	2:24:35	Cesarina Taroni (ITA)	2:55:00
9	1990	Joseph Bulatao (PHI)	2:22:01	Ledesma Semana (PHI)	3:13:41
10	1991	Herman Suizo (PHI)	2:22:46	Irina Ruban (URS)	2:53:56

=== Manila Marathon ===
Ed.	Year	Men's winner	Time	Women's winner	Time
1	2024	Eduard Flores (PHI)	2:33:22	Jane Wanjiru Muriuki (KEN)	3:11:34
2	2025	Eduard Flores (PHI)	2:30:10	Cristine Hallasgo (PHI)	2:55:34
3	2026	Allan Arbois Jr. (PHI)	2:31:16	Jewel de Luna (PHI)	3:22:07
4	2027	TBD	—	TBD	—

== Notes ==
1. h:m:s
