= Duncan MacDonald (athlete) =

American long-distance runner

Personal information
- Full name: Duncan E. MacDonald
- Nationality: American
- Born: January 15, 1949 (age 77) Honolulu, Hawaii, United States

Sport
- Sport: Long-distance running
- Event: 5000 metres

Duncan E. MacDonald (born January 15, 1949) is an American long-distance runner. He ran collegiately for Stanford University and competed in the men's 5000 metres at the 1976 Summer Olympics. He was also a three-time winner of the Honolulu Marathon, in 1973, 1974 and 1980. In 2017, MacDonald was the boys and girls cross country coach at the Punahou School in Honolulu.
