= Víctor Mora (runner) =

Colombian long-distance runner

Personal information
- Full name: Víctor Manuel Mora García
- Born: November 24, 1944 (age 81) Bogotá, Colombia
- Height: 1.70 m (5 ft 7 in)
- Weight: 67 kg (148 lb)

Sport
- Country: Colombia
- Sport: Men's Athletics

Achievements and titles
- Olympic finals: 1972 Summer Olympics; 1976 Summer Olympics
Medal record
Men's Athletics
Representing Colombia
Central American and Caribbean Games
Gold medal – first place	1974 Santo Domingo	5.000 m
Bolivarian Games
Gold medal – first place	1970 Maracaibo	5,000 m
Gold medal – first place	1970 Maracaibo	3,000 m steeplechase
Gold medal – first place	1973 Panama City	5,000 m
Gold medal – first place	1973 Panama City	10,000 m
Gold medal – first place	1973 Panama City	3,000 m steeplechase

Víctor Manuel Mora García (born November 24, 1944) is a retired long-distance runner from Colombia. He won the gold medal in the men's 5.000 metres event in (14:32) minutes at the 1974 Central American and Caribbean Games, and competed for his native country at two consecutive Summer Olympics, starting in 1972 (Munich, West Germany).

He also won the Saint Silvester Road Race in São Paulo in 1972, 1973, 1975 and 1981.

== Personal bests ==
- 10,000 metres — 27.55.72 (1976)
- Marathon — 2:12:55 (1981)

== International competitions ==
Year	Competition	Venue	Position	Event	Notes
Representing Colombia
1967	Pan American Games	Winnipeg, Canada	8th	5000 m	14:35.4
1967	Pan American Games	Winnipeg, Canada	5th	10,000 m	30:57.8
1967	South American Championships	Buenos Aires, Argentina	?	1500 m	NT
1967	South American Championships	Buenos Aires, Argentina	1st	5000 m	14:32.2
1967	South American Championships	Buenos Aires, Argentina	2nd	10,000 m	30:57.4
1969	South American Championships	Quito, Ecuador	1st	5000 m	15:36.6
1969	South American Championships	Quito, Ecuador	1st	10,000 m	32:27.2
1969	South American Championships	Quito, Ecuador	2nd	3000 m s'chase	9:53.2
1970	Central American and Caribbean Games	Panama City, Panama	8th	5000 m	14:50.2
1970	Central American and Caribbean Games	Panama City, Panama	6th	10,000 m	31:18.6
1970	Central American and Caribbean Games	Panama City, Panama	8th	3000 m s'chase	9:26.4
1970	Bolivarian Games	Maracaibo, Venezuela	1st	5000 m	14:08.1
1970	Bolivarian Games	Maracaibo, Venezuela	1st	3000 m s'chase	8:54.6
1971	Pan American Games	Cali, Colombia	6th	5000 m	14:25.17
1971	Pan American Games	Cali, Colombia	5th	3000 m s'chase	8:52.60
1971	South American Championships	Lima, Peru	2nd	5000 m	14:08.8
1971	South American Championships	Lima, Peru	2nd	10,000 m	29:17.6
1971	South American Championships	Lima, Peru	1st	3000 m s'chase	9:03.8
1972	Olympic Games	Munich, West Germany	52nd	Marathon	2:37:34
1973	Bolivarian Games	Panama City, Panama	1st	5000 m	14:20.0
1973	Bolivarian Games	Panama City, Panama	1st	10,000 m	29:26.18
1973	Bolivarian Games	Panama City, Panama	1st	3000 m s'chase	8:48.7
1973	Central American and Caribbean Championships	Maracaibo, Venezuela	1st	5000 m	14:04.2
1973	Central American and Caribbean Championships	Maracaibo, Venezuela	1st	10,000 m	29:56.4
1973	Central American and Caribbean Championships	Maracaibo, Venezuela	3rd	3000 m s'chase	8:58.2
1974	Central American and Caribbean Games	Santo Domingo, Dominican Republic	1st	5000 m	13:54.20
1975	South American Championships	Rio de Janeiro, Brazil	2nd	5000 m	14:02.2
1975	South American Championships	Rio de Janeiro, Brazil	1st	10,000 m	28:45.8
1975	South American Championships	Rio de Janeiro, Brazil	2nd	3000 m s'chase	8:53.8
1976	Olympic Games	Montreal, Canada	34th (h)	10,000 m	30:26.57
1979	Pan American Games	San Juan, Puerto Rico	7th	5000 m	14:17.7
1979	Pan American Games	San Juan, Puerto Rico	6th	10,000 m	29:27.4
1981	South American Championships	La Paz, Bolivia	1st	5000 m	15:23.9
1981	South American Championships	La Paz, Bolivia	1st	10,000 m	31:56.4
1981	South American Championships	La Paz, Bolivia	1st	Half marathon	1:10:42
1983	Central American and Caribbean Championships	Havana, Cuba	1st	Marathon	2:58:51
1985	Berlin Marathon	Berlin, West Germany	17th	Marathon	2:18:12
1987	Pan American Games	Indianapolis, United States	7th	Marathon	2:33:11
1989	Boston Marathon	Boston, United States	19th	Marathon	2:22:49
