= Reyes Patria family =

Colombian Aristocratic Family

Reyes Patria Family
- Aristocracy & Military Family
- Parent family: Reyes
- Country: Colombia; Venezuela
- Current region: South America
- Origin: Santa Rosa de Viterbo (Boyacá) Colombia
- Founded: 1819
- Founder: Juan José Reyes-Patria Escobar
- Connected families: Acosta family Pardo family Valderrama family Vergara family
- Distinctions: Surname Reyes-Patria given by Simon Bolivar
- Estates: Hacienda in Santa Rosa de Viterbo, Boyacá, Colombia. National Monument

The Reyes Patria family is a Colombian family of Spanish origins that was part of both the colonial aristocracy and the military efforts to liberate Colombia from the Spanish crown during the Colombian Independence.

It was prominent in colonial Colombia and rose to great military & political influence, especially in Boyacá, Colombia. The family owned several trade businesses between Sogamoso, Boyacá and Cúcuta, Boyacá. The family is known for general and hero of the independence Juan José Reyes Patria Escobar: Simón Bolívar bestowed him with surname of Reyes Patria in honor of his heroism in the development to create New Granada. Members of the family include General Gabriel Reyes Patria, pilot Jaime Reyes Patria Pardo. From paternal side they are direct descendants of Governor Conquistador Juan Bautista de los Reyes pacifier of the pijaos, landowner, warrior man, prosperous and who gives rise to the Reyes lineage, born in Burgos, Spain; They share ancestry with Rafael Reyes, president of Colombia from 1904 to 1909.

== Toponymy ==
Reyes Patria School, Colombia

Reyes Patria Cooperative School, Sogamoso, Colombia

Reyes Patria is a town in Boyacá

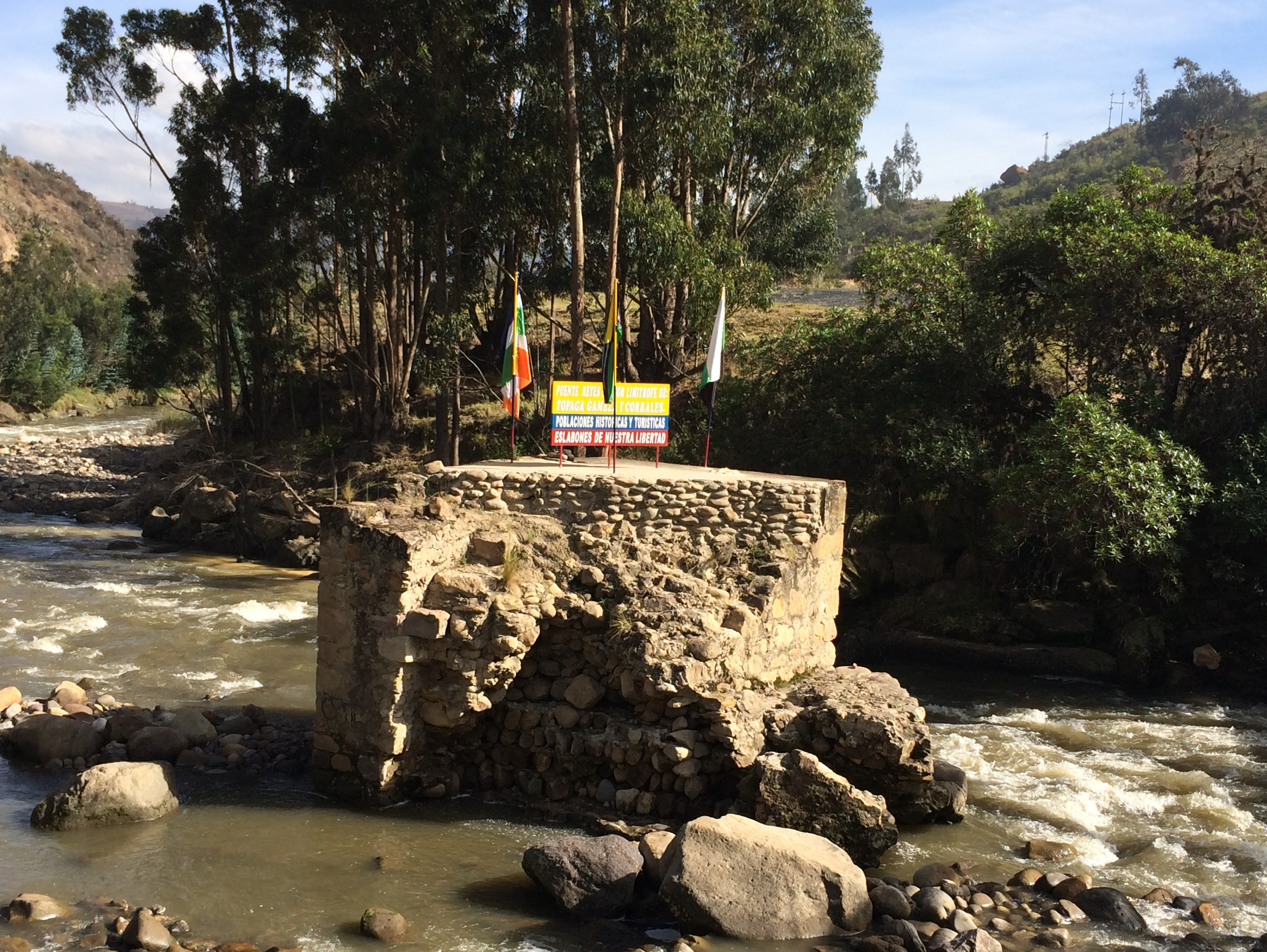
Reyes Patria Bridge in 2014

Vereda Reyes Patria, Corrales

Reyes Patria Bridge, Boyacá, Colombia

Monument of Juan José Reyes Patria, Boyacá, Colombia
