= Luis Hernández (runner) =

Mexican long-distance runner

Personal information
- Born: August 26, 1955 (age 70) Xalapa, Veracruz, Mexico.
- Height: 1.74 m (5 ft 9 in)
- Weight: 58 kg (128 lb)
Medal record
Men's Athletics
Representing Mexico
Pan American Games
Gold medal – first place	1975 Mexico City	10,000 metres

Luis Ceferino Hernández Morales (born August 26, 1955) is a retired long-distance runner from Mexico. He claimed the gold medal at the 1975 Pan American Games in the Men's 10,000 metres, and represented his native country the following year at the 1976 Summer Olympics in Montréal, Canada.

Running for the BYU Cougars track and field team, Hernández won the 1977 3 miles at the NCAA Division I Indoor Track and Field Championships in a time of 13:20.55.

== International competitions ==
Year	Competition	Venue	Position	Event	Notes
Representing Mexico
1975	Central American and Caribbean Championships	Ponce, Puerto Rico	1st	5000 m	15:04.7
1975	Pan American Games	Mexico City, Mexico	4th	5000 m	14:21.59
1975	Pan American Games	Mexico City, Mexico	1st	10,000 m	29:19.28
1975	Pan American Games	Mexico City, Mexico	1st	Marathon	DNF
1976	Olympic Games	Montreal, Canada	15th (h)	5000 m	13:36.42
1976	Olympic Games	Montreal, Canada	22nd (h)	10,000 m	28:44.17
1978	Central American and Caribbean Games	Medellín, Colombia	3rd	10,000 m	30:23.84

== Personal bests ==
- 5000 metres – 13:32.35 (1972)
- 10,000 metres – 28:18.16 (1975)
