= Roy Bottse =

Surinamese middle-distance runner

Personal information
- Nationality: Surinamese
- Born: Roy Paul Bottse; 14 January 1951 (age 75) Suriname
- Height: 1.90 m (6 ft 3 in)
- Weight: 74 kg (163 lb)

Sport
- Sport: Middle-distance running
- Event: 800 metres

Roy Paul Bottse (born 14 January 1951) is a Surinamese middle-distance runner. He competed in the men's 800 metres at the 1976 Summer Olympics.

Bottse was a lieutenant in both the Dutch and later the Suriname National Army. In 1979, he claimed that the Dutch Colonel Hans Valk who was seconded to the Surinamese Army, asked him to prepare a coup d'état which Bottse refused. Colonel Valk denied ever making the request. On 25 February 1980, there was a coup d'état which became known as the Sergeants' Coup. The Sergeants were also in close contact with Colonel Hans Valk.

Bottse left Suriname for the Netherlands and took up arms against the Surinamese regime in the 1980s. In preparation for a counter-coup against the regime, Bottse was interviewed by CNN in French Guiana. The counter-coup failed, because the group was arrested in French Guiana, and returned to the Netherlands.

Now a lawyer, Bottse was a candidate for Partido MAN in the 2016 Curaçao general election.
