= Athletics at the 1975 Pan American Games – Men's 10,000 metres =

Men's 10,000 metres at the Pan American Games

The men's 10,000 metres event at the 1975 Pan American Games was held in Mexico City on 13 October.

== Results ==
Rank	Name	Nationality	Time	Notes
1st place, gold medalist(s)	Luis Hernández	Mexico	29:19.28	
2nd place, silver medalist(s)	Rodolfo Gómez	Mexico	29:21.22	
3rd place, bronze medalist(s)	Domingo Tibaduiza	Colombia	29:25.45	
4	Garry Bjorklund	United States	29:52.36	
5	Rafael Pérez	Costa Rica	30:07.97	
6	Edmundo Warnke	Chile	30:31.67	
7	John Gregorio	United States	30:42.25	
8	Hipólito López	Honduras	32:22.13	
