= Radamés González =

Cuban marathon runner

Personal information
- Born: February 4, 1956 (age 70) Río Cauto, Cuba
- Height: 1.69 m (5 ft 7 in)
- Weight: 58 kg (128 lb)
Medal record
Men's Athletics
Representing Cuba
Pan American Games
Gold medal – first place	1979 San Juan	Marathon
Bronze medal – third place	1991 Havana	Marathon
Central American and Caribbean Games
Silver medal – second place	1982 Havana	Marathon
Silver medal – second place	1986 Santiago	Marathon
CAC Championships
Gold medal – first place	1981 Santo Domingo	Marathon

Radamés González Tamayo (Spanish pronunciation: [raðaˈmes ɣonˈsales]; born February 4, 1956) is a Cuban former marathon runner. He won the gold medal at the 1979 Pan American Games; gold medal at the 1982 Central America and Caribbean Games; silver medal at the 1986 Central America and Caribbean Games; silver medal at the 1991 PanAmerican Games in La Habana, Cuba. He won the following marathons: 1988, Calviá, Palma de Mallorca; 1990 Valencia, Spain; 1991, Mérida, México. Gonzalez Tamayo competed for his native country at the 1980 Summer Olympics.

== International competitions ==
Year	Competition	Venue	Position	Event	Notes
Representing Cuba
1978	Central American and Caribbean Games	Medellín, Colombia	–	10,000 m	DNF
1978	Central American and Caribbean Games	Medellín, Colombia	4th	Marathon	2:27:42
1979	Central American and Caribbean Championships	Guadalajara, Mexico	2nd	Marathon	1:27:35
1979	Pan American Games	San Juan, Puerto Rico	1st	Marathon	2:24:09
1980	Olympic Games	Moscow, Soviet Union	–	Marathon	DNF
1981	Central American and Caribbean Championships	Santo Domingo, Dominican Republic	1st	Marathon	2:23:15
1982	Central American and Caribbean Games	Havana, Cuba	2nd	Marathon	2:28:12
1983	Pan American Games	Caracas, Venezuela	–	Marathon	DNF
1986	Central American and Caribbean Games	Santiago, Dominican Republic	2nd	Marathon	2:25:54
1988	Ibero-American Championships	Mexico City, Mexico	3rd	Marathon	2:28:25
1989	World Marathon Cup	Milan, Italy	15th	Marathon	2:14:32
1990	Central American and Caribbean Games	Mexico City, Mexico	–	Marathon	DNF
1991	Pan American Games	Havana, Cuba	3rd	marathon	2:23:05
