= José Gómez (runner) =

Mexican long-distance runner (1956–2021)

Personal information
- Born: 19 March 1956 Chihuahua City, Mexico
- Died: 29 July 2021 (aged 65)

Sport
- Sport: Track and field
Medal record
Representing Mexico
Pan American Games
Gold medal – first place	1983 Caracas	10,000m
Central American and Caribbean Games
Bronze medal – third place	1978 Medellin	5000m
Summer Universiade
Silver medal – second place	1979 Mexico City	5000m

José Gómez Cervantes (19 March 1956 – 29 July 2021) was a long-distance runner from Mexico, who represented his native country at two consecutive Summer Olympics, starting in 1980.

He died on 29 July 2021.

== International competitions ==
Year	Competition	Venue	Position	Event	Notes
Representing Mexico
1977	Universiade	Sofia, Bulgaria	31st (h)	1500 m	3:57.0
1977	Universiade	Sofia, Bulgaria	14th	5000 m	14:37.9
1978	Central American and Caribbean Games	Medellín, Colombia	3rd	5000 m	14:27.33
1979	Central American and Caribbean Championships	Guadalajara, Mexico	1st	5000 m	14:27.4
1979	Universiade	Mexico City, Mexico	2nd	5000 m	14:15.4
1980	Olympic Games	Moscow, Soviet Union	24th (h)	10,000 m	29:53.6
1982	New York City Marathon	New York City, United States	8th	Marathon	2:13.43
1983	World Championships	Helsinki, Finland	16th	10,000 m	28:42.61
1983	Pan American Games	Caracas, Venezuela	1st	10,000 m	29:14.75
1984	Olympic Games	Los Angeles, United States	15th (h)	10,000 m	28:28.50
1985	Chicago Marathon	Chicago, United States	6th	Marathon	2:11:08
1986	Chicago Marathon	Chicago, United States	9th	Marathon	2:14:58
