= Kenneth Elmer =

Canadian middle-distance runner

Personal information
- Nationality: Canadian
- Born: 24 April 1948 (age 78) Vancouver, British Columbia, Canada

Sport
- Sport: Middle-distance running
- Event: 1500 metres

Kenneth Elmer (born 24 April 1948) is a Canadian middle-distance runner. He competed in the men's 1500 metres at the 1972 Summer Olympics.
