= Ric Sayre =

American runner

Ric Sayre (b. Akron, Ohio, August 9, 1953 – d. Ashland, Oregon, June 21, 2011) was a nationally renowned American runner, best known for his ability to compete at the elite level in numerous marathons each year. Sayre’s most noted achievement was winning the inaugural Los Angeles Marathon in 1986 with a career-best time of 2 hours, 12 minutes, and 59 seconds. The next year, in 1987, Sayre won the United States national marathon championship. He was also one of only four American men who have qualified in the marathon for the U.S. Olympic Trials five times. Sayre also excelled as a trail runner.

Sayre routinely competed in seven to eight marathons a year; of the fifty he competed in during his career, he won a dozen. Sayre, who was a lean 135 pounds, at five feet, ten and a half inches, credited his vegetarian diet with helping him recover quickly from races.

"Most (marathoners) run in one or two marathons a year," Sayre said. "They'll run once in the spring and once in the fall. They say that it takes you a day for each mile you run to recover. "But it takes me four days to a week to recover. I think part of it has to do with my diet and part has to do with psychology."

He finished seventh overall in the 1987 Houston Marathon, which served as the U.S. marathon Championship. As the first American finisher in Houston, he qualified for that year's Pan American Games in Indianapolis, Indiana.

Sayre developed as an athlete as a member of the Summit Athletic Club in Akron, Ohio.

== Los Angeles Marathon ==
Sayre's victory in the 1986 Los Angeles Marathon, with a time of 2:12:59, earned him $10,000 and a $23,000 Mercedes-Benz, which he sold to help finance a home he built in Ashland. His time ranked him in the top ten among U. S. Marathoners for 1986; he was again ranked among the top ten Americans in 1987.

== Collegiate career ==
Sayre was a two-time NAIA All-American in cross country for Walsh University, in North Canton, Ohio.

The Ric Sayre Invitational Cross Country Meet is held in North Canton each year, at Sayre's alma mater.

== Marathon prodigy ==
In 1984 he won the Vancouver Marathon in 2:16:34 and followed that Canadian victory with another in 1985 at the National Capital Marathon in Ottawa, with a time of 2:16:18. In 1987, he won the Melbourne Marathon in 2:14:16.

== Ashland trail running ==
Sayre was a longtime Ashland, Oregon resident, having moved there in 1981 to take advantage of favorable training conditions there. Subsequently, he has been accorded acclaim as Ashland's "original trail runner", as a vibrant running community has sprung up since his arrival, in large part due to the many established running trails in the vicinity, that he used frequently.

“He was so good, he just kind of set the standard for toughness,” according to Bob Julian Jr., the cross country coach for Ashland High School. “He basically was the standard around here, and nobody could compete with him. Ric wasn’t just about running. He was a pretty humble guy, pretty quiet. He’d always stand up for people and would help them out if they were having rough times.”

He was the 1982 Pear Blossom Run champion in Medford, Oregon and set the current course record at the Mt. Ashland Hill Climb.

Sayre worked fourteen years at the Ashland Food Cooperative, where he was serving his third three-year term as the employee representative on the co-op's board of directors.
