= Juan José Reyes-Patria Escobar =

Colombian politician and military leader

General Juan José Reyes Patria Escobar
- Born: July 11, 1785; Santa Rosa de Viterbo, Boyacá
- Died: 10 December 1872 (aged 87); Corrales, Boyaca
- Resting place: Santa Rosa de Viterbo, Boyacá, Colombia
- Occupations: Military leader, Politician
- Family: Reyes Patria family
- Honours: Surname Reyes-Patria given by Simon Bolivar

Notes
- Vargas Battalion Commander

Juan José Reyes-Patria Escobar (1785–1872) was a Colombian Independence War general.

== Early life ==
Juan José Reyes-Patria Escobar was born on 11 July 1785 in Santa Rosa de Viterbo, Boyacá, today's Colombia. His father was Manuel Ignacio de los Reyes Forero, a close friend of Simon Bolivar, and founder of Floresta. Together with his wife, María de la Luz Escobar y Torres they had six children. On his father's side he is a direct descendant of Governor Juan Bautista de Los Reyes born in Burgos, Spain circa 1648 and shares the same ancestor with Rafael Reyes, President of Colombia (1904-1909).

General Reyes-Patria was educated in Tunja, Boyacá, where wealthy families sent their children to school. As a young man he was active in trade between Sogamoso, Boyacá and Cúcuta, Norte de Santander. Trade between these cities in the late 1700s was lucrative but difficult and risky as they are separated by the western Andes mountains. The broken terrain made trade an easy prey for robbers. This early life activity taught Reyes-Patria to become a warrior and to develop skills which would years later make him a hero of the Independence Wars against the Spanish.

== Career ==
Commercial and travel activity were conducive to new ideas from the European Enlightenment. When the cry of the Independence of 1810 was given and all of Spanish America rebelled against the Spanish, Juan José Reyes entered to serve the armies of the First Republic participating in various wars. He entered the Colombian patriotic army arriving as a lieutenant in 1814, and subsequently becoming captain in 1818, lieutenant colonel in 1819, colonel in 1828, and general in 1852 . Reyes-Patria served under the command of Custodio García Rovira and Antonio Baraya until the Reconquista, when he had to take refuge in Casanare and Apure with José Antonio Páez and Ramón Nonato Pérez. He fought in Gámeza, Boyacá and Pantano de Vargas, organized by the Vargas battalion and by order of Simón Bolívar was sent to Barinas, Venezuela.

The battle of Gámeza, on 11 July 1819, was key in the independence of Colombians, and in the main park of the municipality there is a monument to Reyes Patria and the indigenous chieftains Gamza and Siatoba. Simón Bolívar bestowed him with surname of Reyes Patria in honor of his heroism in the development to create New Granada.

Reyes-Patria was military commander of Ocaña, Santa Marta, and La Guajira, and governor of Riohacha between 1821 and 1824, governor of Casanare in 1828 and fought for the federal cause in the Colombian civil wars of 1840, 1851, 1854 and 1860.

"When this heroic encounter ended, Bolívar called the patriotic officer who opened the curtain of that battle and asked him his name: Juan José Reyes Escobar, he answered. Bolívar told him: you will not carry that surname that means slavery, henceforth it will be called Patria. Since then he has been known as Reyes Patria," says Omar Vargas, who compiled this story.

== Personal life ==
Reyes-Patria was married to Micaela Valderrama Suárez and together they had six children. In 1863, General Reyes Patria, retired at his hacienda in Corrales to write his memoirs and to live his later years practicing his Catholic faith both as a philanthropist and a student of the Scriptures and Philosophy. His hacienda still exists and is a national monument.

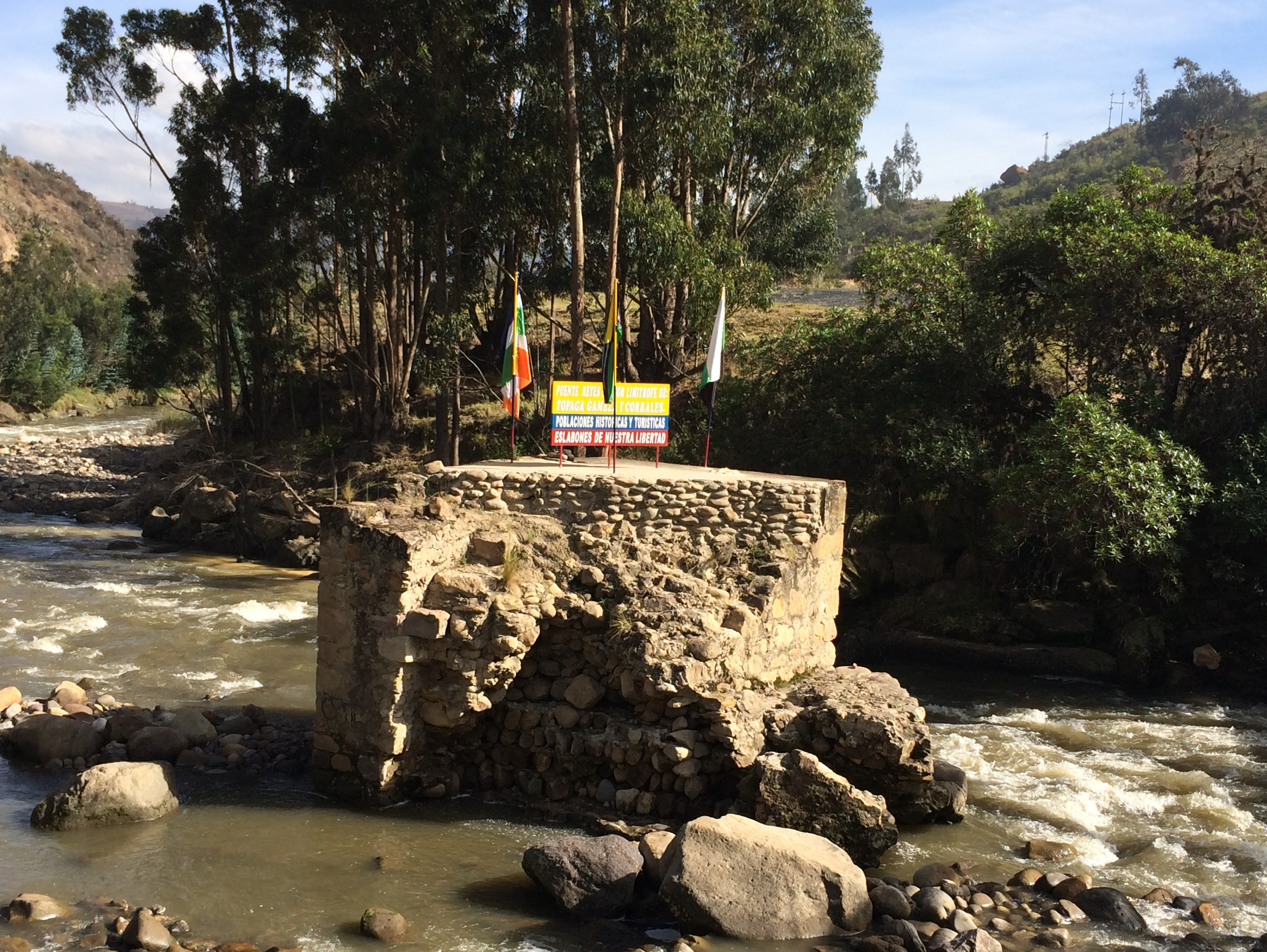
Reyes Patria Bridge, Boyacá, Colombia. 2014

== Death ==
He died in the town of Corrales, Boyacá on 10 December 1872. He was buried next to his wife in the Corrales Cemetery.
