= Ronald Lanzoni =

Costa Rican long-distance runner

Personal information
- Born: August 21, 1959 (age 66) San José, Costa Rica

Sport
- Sport: Marathon running
Medal record
Representing Costa Rica
Pan American Games
Silver medal – second place	1987 Indianapolis	Marathon

Ronald "Ronaldo" Alfredo Lanzoni Campos (born August 21, 1959) is a retired long-distance runner from Costa Rica. He claimed the silver medal at the 1987 Pan American Games in the men's marathon, and twice represented his native country at the Summer Olympics (1984 and 1988). He set his personal best (2:14.33) in the classic distance in 1987.

== Achievements ==
Year	Competition	Venue	Position	Event	Notes
Representing Costa Rica
1984	Olympic Games	Los Angeles, United States	—	Marathon	DNF
1987	Pan American Games	Indianapolis, United States	2nd	Marathon	2:20:39
1988	Olympic Games	Seoul, South Korea	40th	Marathon	2:23:45

== See also ==
- Costa Rican records in athletics
