= Mike Manley (athlete) =

American athlete (1942–2025)

Personal information
- Born: February 14, 1942 Wausau, Wisconsin, United States
- Died: October 28, 2025 (aged 83)
Medal record
Men's Athletics
Representing the United States
Pan American Games
Gold medal – first place	1971 Cali	3000 m Steeplechase
Gold medal – first place	1975 Mexico City	3000 m Steeplechase

Peter Michael Manley (February 14, 1942 – October 28, 2025) was a middle and long-distance runner from the United States. He won the gold medal twice in the men's 3000 metres steeplechase event at the Pan American Games 1971 and 1975.

Manley represented his native country in the steeplechase at the 1972 Summer Olympics in Munich, West Germany, finishing 10th of 13 finishers in a preliminary heat and not advancing to the next round. He was the 1969 AAU steeplechase champion while competing for the Southern California Striders, and competed for the University of Wisconsin–Madison and the Oregon Track Club. In 1987 Manley competed in the Legends Mile at Hayward Field.

== Personal bests ==
- Mile – 4:01.4 (1974)
- 2 miles – 8:34.8 (1972)
- 3000 meters steeplechase – 8:27.6 (1971)
- 5000 metres – 13:42.4 (1976)
- 10000 metres – 29:10.0 (1976)
- Marathon – 2:14:43 (1980)
- Mike Lanley Personal Best
