= 1975 Pan American Games =

7th edition of the Pan American Games

VII Pan American Games
- Host: Mexico City, Mexico
- Nations: 33
- Athletes: 3,146
- Events: 190 in 19 sports
- Opening: October 12
- Closing: October 26
- Opened by: President Luis Echeverría
- Cauldron lighter: Rodolfo Gómez
- Main venue: Estadio Azteca

The 1975 Pan American Games, officially known as the VII Pan American Games (Spanish: VII Juegos Panamericanos) and commonly known as Mexico 1975 (Spanish: México 1975), were held in Mexico City, Mexico, from October 12 to October 26, 1975, exactly twenty years after the second Pan American Games were held there. It was the third major sporting event held in the Mexican capital in seven years, after the 1968 Summer Olympics and the 1970 FIFA World Cup.

== Host city election ==
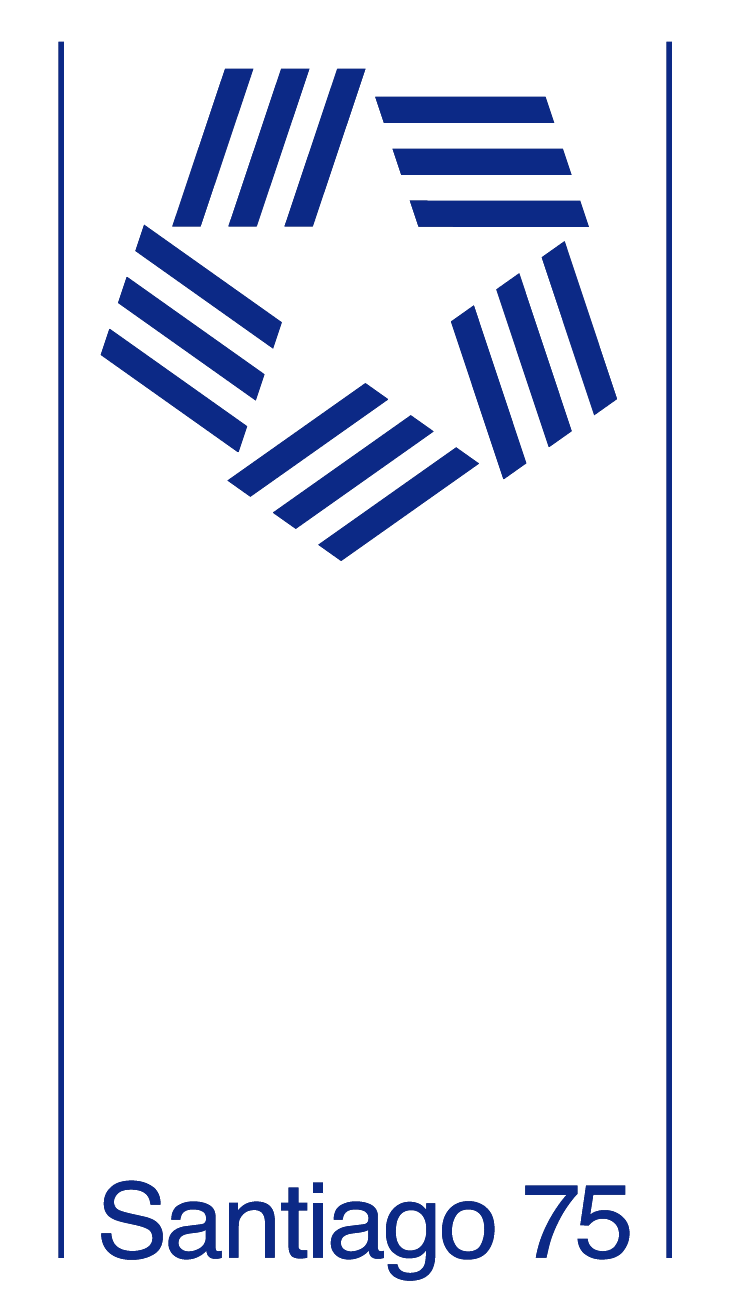
Logo of Santiago as host city.

Two cities submitted bids to host the 1975 Pan American Games that were recognized by the Pan American Sports Organization. On August 29, 1969, Santiago was selected unanimously over San Juan to host the VII Pan American Games by PASO at its 10th general assembly, held in Cali, Colombia.

In 1973, Santiago dropped out from hosting, and in 1974, its replacement São Paulo did the same. Mexico City was granted the hosting rights with just 10 months to prepare.

== Medal count ==
^{1}	Host nation

To sort this table by nation, total medal count, or any other column, click on the icon next to the column title.

Rank	Nation	Gold	Silver	Bronze	Total
1	United States ^{a}	117	82	48/47	247/246
2	Cuba ^{a}	56/57	45	33/32	134
3	Canada ^{a}	19/18	35	40/38	94/91
4	Mexico ^{1}	9	13	38	60
5	Brazil	8	13	23	44

Note

The medal counts for the United States, Cuba and Canada are disputed.

== Sports ==
- Athletics ()
- Baseball ()
- Basketball ()
- Boxing ()
- Cycling ()
- Diving ()
- Equestrian ()
- Fencing ()
- Field hockey ()
- Football ()
- Gymnastics ()
- Judo ()
- Rowing ()
- Sailing ()
- Shooting ()
- Swimming ()
- Synchronized swimming ()
- Tennis ()
- Volleyball ()
- Water polo ()
- Weightlifting ()
- Wrestling ()

Preceded by Cali	VII Pan American Games; Mexico City (1975)	Succeeded by San Juan
