= Ivo Rodrigues (runner) =

Brazilian marathon runner

Ivo Machado Rodrigues (born October 15, 1960) is a former marathon runner from Brazil. He won the gold medal at the 1987 Pan American Games and competed for his native country at the 1988 Summer Olympics, finishing in 56th place.

== Achievements ==
- All results regarding marathon, unless stated otherwise

Year	Competition	Venue	Position	Notes
Representing Brazil
1987	Pan American Games	Indianapolis, United States	1st	2:20:13
1988	Olympic Games	Seoul, South Korea	56th	2:26:27
