= Miguel Ángel Cruz =

Mexican long-distance runner

Personal information
- Nationality: Mexican
- Born: 29 September 1955 (age 70)
- Height: 1.67 m (5 ft 6 in)
- Weight: 58 kg (128 lb)

Sport
- Sport: Long-distance running
- Event: Marathon
Medal record
Men's athletics
Representing Mexico
Pan American Games
Bronze medal – third place	1983 Caracas	Marathon
Bronze medal – third place	1983 Caracas	Marathon
Central American and Caribbean Games
Bronze medal – third place	1982 Havana	Marathon

Miguel Ángel Cruz (born 29 September 1955) is a Mexican long-distance runner. He competed in the marathon at the 1984 Summer Olympics.

Cruz won the bronze medal in the marathon at the 1982 Central American and Caribbean Games. The following year, he won the bronze medal at the 1983 Pan American Games.

Cruz finished 7th at the 1984 Los Angeles International Marathon, qualifying for the Mexican Olympic team in a personal best time of 2:14:12.
