= Luis Raudales =

Honduran long-distance runner

Personal information
- Full name: Luis Antonio Raudales
- Nationality: Honduran
- Born: 21 May 1956 (age 70)
- Height: 1.71 m (5 ft 7 in)
- Weight: 56 kg (123 lb)

Sport
- Sport: Long-distance running
- Event: Marathon

Luis Antonio Raudales (born 21 May 1956) is a Honduran long-distance runner. He competed in the marathon at the 1976 Summer Olympics.

== Personal bests ==
- Marathon – 2:29:25 (1976)
