= Enrique Aquino =

Mexican long-distance runner

Personal information
- Full name: Enrique Aquino Busquets
- Nationality: Mexican
- Born: 1 May 1950 (age 76)

Sport
- Sport: Long-distance running
- Event: 5000 metres
Medal record
Representing Mexico
Pan American Games
| Silver medal – second place | 1979 San Juan | 10,000m |
Central American and Caribbean Games
| Silver medal – second place | 1982 Havana | 10,000m |
Summer Universiade
| Silver medal – second place | 1979 Mexico City | 10,000m |
| Bronze medal – third place | 1979 Mexico City | 5000m |

Enrique Aquino Busquets (born 1 May 1950) is a Mexican long-distance runner. He competed in the men's 5000 metres and 10,000 metres at the 1980 Summer Olympics.
