= Rodolfo Gómez =

Mexican long-distance runner

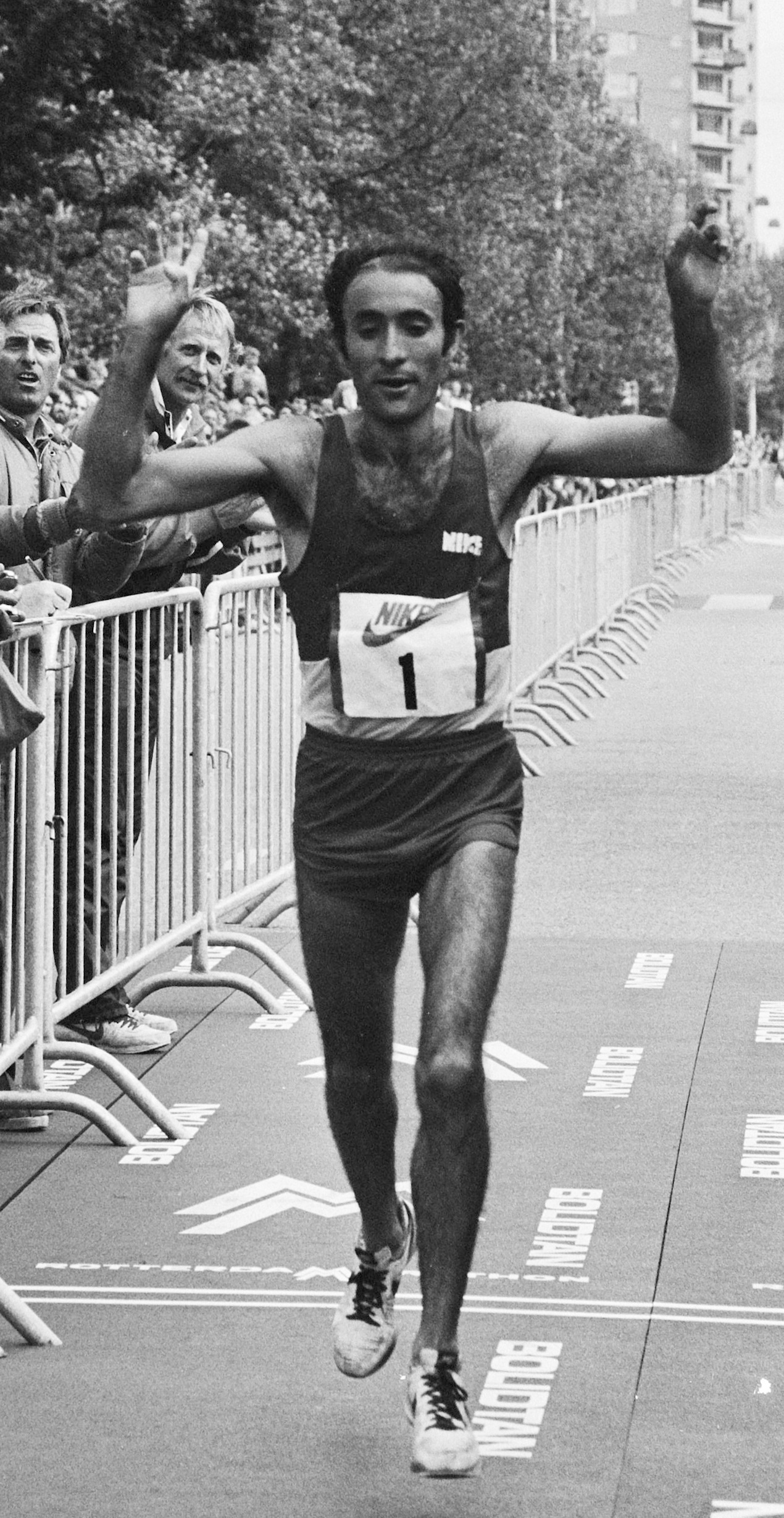

Medal record

Men's athletics

Representing Mexico

Pan American Games
Gold medal – first place	1979 San Juan	10,000 metres
Silver medal – second place	1975 Mexico City	10,000 metres
Bronze medal – third place	1975 Mexico City	5000 metres
Bronze medal – third place	1979 San Juan	5000 metres

Rodolfo Gómez Orozco (born 30 October 1950 in Delicias, Chihuahua) is a Mexican former long-distance runner who was one of the leading runners represented from Mexico in the 1970s and 1980s. He won the Tokyo Marathon (1981), the IAAF Citizen Golden Marathon in Athens (1982), the Rotterdam Marathon (1982), the Nike OTC Marathon (1982), the Pittsburgh Marathon (1987) and the Mexico City Marathon (1987). He gained prominence on American television in 1982 when he finished in second place, four seconds back in 2:09:33 while being the primary foil to Alberto Salazar's third victory in a row at the New York Marathon. He ran a personal best of 2:09:12 at the 1983 Tokyo Marathon, finishing third in that race.

Gómez was an All-American runner for the UTEP Miners track and field team, placing 7th in the 5000 metres at the 1978 NCAA Division I Outdoor Track and Field Championships.

Gómez represented Mexico at three consecutive Summer Olympics, starting in 1976. Later on he became an athletics coach, guiding runners like Andrés Espinosa, Germán Silva, Benjamín Paredes, Adriana Fernández, Isaac García, Martín Pitayo, and Isidro Rico.

== Achievements ==
Year	Competition	Venue	Position	Event	Notes
Representing Mexico
1976	Olympic Games	Montréal, Canada	19th	Marathon	2:18:21
1979	Fukuoka Marathon	Fukuoka, Japan	15th	Marathon	2:16:18
1980	Olympic Games	Moscow, Soviet Union	6th	Marathon	2:12:39
1980	New York City Marathon	New York City, United States	2nd	Marathon	2:10:13
1981	Tokyo Marathon	Tokyo, Japan	1st	Marathon	2:11:00
1981	New York City Marathon	New York, United States	7th	Marathon	2:12:47
1982	Golden Marathon	Athens, Greece	1st	Marathon	2:11:49
1982	Rotterdam Marathon	Rotterdam, Netherlands	1st	Marathon	2:11:57
1982	Nike OTC Marathon	Eugene, Oregon	1st	Marathon	2:11:35
1982	New York City Marathon	New York, United States	2nd	Marathon	2:09:33
1983	Tokyo Marathon	Tokyo, Japan	3rd	Marathon	2:09:12
1983	Rotterdam Marathon	Rotterdam, Netherlands	3rd	Marathon	2:09:25
1986	Chicago Marathon	Chicago, United States	10th	Marathon	2:15:02
1987	Pittsburgh Marathon	Pittsburgh, United States	1st	Marathon	2:13:07
