= List of 5000 metres national champions (men) =

Below a list of all National champions in the Men's 5000 metres (track outdoor) in track and field from several countries since 1980, some since 1970.

== Australia ==
- 1980: Stephen Austin
- 1981: Stephen Austin
- 1982: Stephen Austin
- 1983: Stephen Austin
- 1984: Steve Foley
- 1985: Andrew Lloyd
- 1986: Malcolm Norwood
- 1987: Gerard Barrett
- 1988: Andrew Lloyd
- 1989: John Andrews
- 1990: Simon Doyle
- 1991: Rodney Higgins
- 1992: Andrew Lloyd
- 1993: Peter O'Donoghue
- 1994: Julian Paynter
- 1995: Shaun Creighton
- 1996: Shaun Creighton
- 1997: Julian Paynter
- 1998: Shaun Creighton
- 1999: Mizan Mehari
- 2000: Michael Power
- 2001: Michael Power
- 2002: Craig Mottram
- 2003: Michael Power
- 2004: Craig Mottram
- 2005: Craig Mottram
- 2006: Craig Mottram
- 2007: Craig Mottram
- 2008: Craig Mottram
- 2009: Collis Birmingham
- 2010: Ben St Lawrence
- 2011: Ben St Lawrence
- 2012: Harry Summers

== Belgium ==
- 1970: Emiel Puttemans
- 1971: Emiel Puttemans
- 1972: Emiel Puttemans
- 1973: Emiel Puttemans
- 1974: Leon Schots
- 1975: Leon Schots
- 1976: Willy Polleunis
- 1977: Paul Thys
- 1978: Leon Schots
- 1979: Willy Polleunis
- 1980: Emiel Puttemans
- 1981: Emiel Puttemans
- 1982: Jef Gees
- 1983: Jean-Pierre N’Dayisenga
- 1984: Vincent Rousseau
- 1985: Eddy De Pauw
- 1986: Willy Goddaert
- 1987: Vincent Rousseau
- 1988: Jean-Pierre N’Dayisenga
- 1989: Vincent Rousseau
- 1990: Raymond Van Paemel
- 1991: Ivo Claes
- 1992: Gino Van Geyte
- 1993: Ruddy Walem
- 1994: Gino Van Geyte
- 1995: Ruddy Walem
- 1996: Gino Van Geyte
- 1997: Gino Van Geyte
- 1998: Gino Van Geyte
- 1999: Guy Fays
- 2000: Koen Allaert
- 2001: Tom Compernolle
- 2002: Tom Compernolle
- 2003: Christian Nemeth
- 2004: Tom Compernolle
- 2005: Stefan Van Den Broek
- 2006: Jesse Stroobants
- 2007: Guy Fays
- 2008: Guy Fays
- 2009: Maarten Van Steen
- 2010: Wesley De Kerpel
- 2011: Mats Lunders
- 2012: Mats Lunders
- 2013: Abdelhadi El Hachimi
- 2014: Abdelhadi El Hachimi
- 2015: Koen Naert
- 2016: Koen Naert

== Canada ==
- 1980: Greg Duhaime
- 1981: Peter Butler
- 1982: Phil Laheurte
- 1983: Paul Williams
- 1984: Paul Williams
- 1985: Rob Lonergan
- 1986: Paul Williams
- 1987: Paul McCloy
- 1988: Paul Williams
- 1989: John Castellano
- 1990: Christian Weber
- 1991: Marc Olesen
- 1992: Philip Ellis
- 1993: David Reid
- 1994: Jeff Schiebler
- 1995: Jeff Schiebler
- 1996: Jason Bunston
- 1997: Jeff Schiebler
- 1998: Jeff Schiebler
- 1999: Jeff Schiebler
- 2000: Sean Kaley
- 2001: Jeremy Deere
- 2002: Sean Kaley
- 2003: Sean Kaley
- 2004: Reid Coolsaet
- 2005: Reid Coolsaet
- 2006: Reid Coolsaet
- 2007: Reid Coolsaet
- 2008: Ryan Mckenzie
- 2009: Simon Bairu
- 2010: Dylan Wykes
- 2011: Reid Coolsaet
- 2012: Cameron Levins

== Denmark ==
- 1980: Allan Zachariassen
- 1981: Allan Zachariassen
- 1982: Allan Zachariassen
- 1983: Ole Hansen
- 1984: Keld Johnsen
- 1985: Henrik Jørgensen
- 1986: Allan Zachariassen
- 1987: Flemming Jensen
- 1988: Allan Zachariassen
- 1989: Stig Nørregård
- 1990: Klaus Hansen
- 1991: Henrik Jørgensen
- 1992: Lars Bang
- 1993: Klaus Hansen
- 1994: Klaus Hansen
- 1995: Mogens Guldberg
- 1996: Klaus Hansen
- 1997: Dennis Jensen
- 1998: Dennis Jensen
- 1999: Dennis Jensen
- 2000: Dennis Jensen
- 2001: Dennis Jensen
- 2002: Dennis Jensen
- 2003: Dennis Jensen
- 2004: Robert Kiplagat Andersen
- 2005: Flemming Bjerre
- 2006: Flemming Bjerre
- 2007: Jesper Faurschou

== England ==
- 1980: Richjard Callan
- 1981: Geoff Smith
- 1982: Steve Emson
- 1983: Steve Harris
- 1984: Nick Rose
- 1985: Dave Lewis
- 1986: Tim Hutchings
- 1987: Jack Buckner
- 1988: Eamonn Martin
- 1989: Mark Rowland
- 1990: Eamonn Martin
- 1991: Eamonn Martin
- 1992: Jack Buckner
- 1993: Gary Staines
- 1994: Darren Mead
- 1995: Rob Denmark
- 1996: John Nuttall
- 1997: Kristen Bowditch
- 1998: Karl Keska
- 1999: Rob Denmark
- 2000: Michael Openshaw
- 2001: Jonathan Wild
- 2002: Jonathan Wild
- 2003: Andrew Graffin
- 2004: Chris Thompson
- 2005: Mark Miles
- 2006: Peter Riley
- 2007: Mo Farah
- 2010: Mo Farah

== Estonia ==
- 1917*: Heinrich Paal
- 1918*: Jüri Lossman
- 1919*: Jüri Lossman
- 1920: Jüri Lossman
- 1921: Hugo Osterode
- 1922: Aleksander Erlich
- 1923: Karl Laurson
- 1924: Julius Tiisfeldt
- 1925: Karl Laurson
- 1926: Karl Laurson
- 1927: Karl Laurson
- 1928: Felix Beldsinsky
- 1929: Felix Beldsinsky
- 1930: Martin Prost
- 1931: Felix Beldsinsky
- 1932: Eduard Prööm
- 1933: Eduard Prööm
- 1934: Eduard Prööm
- 1935: Eduard Prööm
- 1936: Eduard Prööm
- 1937: Eduard Prööm
- 1938: Eduard Prööm
- 1939: Eduard Prööm
- 1940: Eduard Prööm
- 1941: -
- 1942: Eduard Prööm
- 1943: Richard Lulla
- 1944: Ilmar Piliste
- 1945: Nikolai Aleksejev
- 1946: Nikolai Aleksejev
- 1947: Nikolai Aleksejev
- 1948: Ilmar Reidla
- 1949: Mihail Velsvebel
- 1950: Mihail Velsvebel
- 1951: Erich Veetõusme
- 1952: Vladimir Kuts
- 1953: Viktor Puusepp
- 1954: Hubert Pärnakivi
- 1955: Hubert Pärnakivi
- 1956: Lembit Virkus
- 1957: Tõnu Soom
- 1958: Tõnu Soom
- 1959: Lembit Virkus
- 1960: Lembit Virkus
- 1961: Hubert Pärnakivi
- 1962: Hubert Pärnakivi
- 1963: Ants Nurmekivi
- 1964: Mart Vilt
- 1965: Mart Vilt
- 1966: Maido Keskküla
- 1967: Erik Maasik
- 1968: Mart Vilt
- 1969: Ants Nurmekivi
- 1970: Aleksander Tšernov
- 1971: Ants Nurmekivi
- 1972: Erik Maasik
- 1973: Vladimir Raudsepp
- 1974: Enn Sellik
- 1975: Erik Maasik
- 1976: Vladimir Raudsepp
- 1977: Lev Zagžetskas
- 1978: Sergei Ustintsev
- 1979: Toomas Turb
- 1980: Toomas Turb
- 1981: Rein Valdmaa
- 1982: Rein Valdmaa
- 1983: Enn Sellik
- 1984: Toomas Turb
- 1985: Toomas Turb
- 1986: Ain Mõnjam
- 1987: Toomas Turb
- 1988: Rein Valdmaa
- 1989: Heiki Sarapuu
- 1990: Margus Kirt
- 1991: Vjatšeslav Košelev
- 1992: Arvi Uba
- 1993: Henno Haava
- 1994: Pavel Loskutov
- 1995: Pavel Loskutov
- 1996: Heiki Sarapuu
- 1997: Heiki Sarapuu
- 1998: Pavel Loskutov
- 1999: Toomas Tarm
- 2000: Margus Pirksaar
- 2001: Risto Ütsmüts
- 2002: Margus Pirksaar
- 2003: Pavel Loskutov
- 2004: Aleksei Saveljev
- 2005: Tiidrek Nurme
- 2006: Tiidrek Nurme
- 2007: Tiidrek Nurme
- 2008: Aleksei Markov
- 2009: Taivo Püi
- 2010: Sergei Tšerepannikov
- 2011: Tiidrek Nurme
- 2012: Allar Lamp
- 2013: Sergei Tšerepannikov
- 2014: Roman Fosti
- 2015: Tiidrek Nurme
- 2016: Keio Kits
- 2017: Tiidrek Nurme
- 2018: Tiidrek Nurme
- 2019: Tiidrek Nurme
- 2020: Tiidrek Nurme
- 2021: Tiidrek Nurme
- 2022: Kaur Kivistik

* unofficial championships

== Finland ==
- 1980: Martti Vainio
- 1981: Martti Vainio
- 1982: Martti Vainio
- 1983: Tommy Ekblom
- 1984: Hannu Okkola
- 1985: Jari Hemmilä
- 1986: Tommy Ekblom
- 1987: Martti Vainio
- 1988: Matti Valkonen
- 1989: Risto Ulmala
- 1990: Harri Hänninen
- 1991: Harri Hänninen
- 1992: Jukka Tammisuo
- 1993: Santtu Mäkinen
- 1994: Pasi Mattila
- 1995: Santtu Mäkinen
- 1996: Pasi Mattila
- 1997: Samuli Vasala
- 1998: Marko Kotila
- 1999: Samuli Vasala
- 2000: Marko Kotila
- 2001: Samuli Vasala
- 2002: Samuli Vasala
- 2003: Jari Matinlauri
- 2004: Jari Matinlauri
- 2005: Jussi Utriainen
- 2006: Jussi Utriainen
- 2007: Jussi Utriainen
- 2008: Jussi Utriainen
- 2009: Lewis Korir
- 2010: Matti Räsänen
- 2011: Jukka Keskisalo

== France ==
- 1980: Philippe Legrand
- 1981: Radhouane Bouster
- 1982: Jacques Boxberger
- 1983: Thierry Watrice
- 1984: Francis Gonzalez
- 1985: Jean-Louis Prianon
- 1986: Paul Arpin
- 1987: Paul Arpin
- 1988: Paul Arpin
- 1989: Pascal Clouvel
- 1990: Jean-Louis Prianon
- 1991: Mustapha Essaïd
- 1992: Antonio Martins
- 1993: Atiq Naaji
- 1994: Mohamed Ezzher
- 1995: Atiq Naaji
- 1996: Mohamed Ezzher
- 1997: Abdellah Béhar
- 1998: Driss El Himer
- 1999: Rachid Chékhémani
- 2000: Driss El Himer
- 2001: Rachid Chékhémani
- 2002: Loïc Letelier
- 2003: Driss El Himer
- 2004: El Moktar ben Hari
- 2005: Loïc Letelier
- 2006: Frédéric Denis
- 2007: Malik Bahloul
- 2008: Nouredine Smaïl
- 2009: Nouredine Smaïl

== Germany ==
=== East Germany ===
- 1980: Jörg Peter
- 1981: Hansjörg Kunze
- 1982: Werner Schildhauer
- 1983: Hansjörg Kunze
- 1984: Hansjörg Kunze
- 1985: Werner Schildhauer
- 1986: Hansjörg Kunze
- 1987: Hansjörg Kunze
- 1988: Axel Krippschock
- 1989: Stephan Freigang
- 1990: Stephan Freigang

=== West Germany ===
- 1980: Karl Fleschen
- 1981: Karl Fleschen
- 1982: Hans-Jürgen Orthmann
- 1983: Paul Nothacker
- 1984: Karl Fleschen
- 1985: Thomas Wessinghage
- 1986: Dieter Baumann
- 1987: Thomas Wessinghage
- 1988: Dieter Baumann
- 1989: Christian Husmann
- 1990: Steffen Brand

=== Unified Germany ===
- 1991: Dieter Baumann
- 1992: Dieter Baumann
- 1993: Rainer Wachenbrunner
- 1994: Dieter Baumann
- 1995: Dieter Baumann
- 1996: Dieter Baumann
- 1997: Dieter Baumann
- 1998: Dieter Baumann
- 1999: Dieter Baumann
- 2000: Jirka Arndt ^{*}
- 2001: Jan Fitschen
- 2002: Jan Fitschen
- 2003: Dieter Baumann
- 2004: Oliver Dietz
- 2005: Jan Fitschen
- 2006: Jan Fitschen
- 2007: Arne Gabius
- 2008: Arne Gabius
- 2009: Arne Gabius
- 2010: Arne Gabius
- 2011: Arne Gabius
- 2012: Arne Gabius
- 2013: Arne Gabius
- 2014: Richard Ringer
- 2015: Richard Ringer

^{*} In 2000 Dieter Baumann won the race in 13:39.17, but he was later disqualified for a drug violation.

== India ==
- 1992: Bahadur Prasad
- 2012: Rahul Kumar Pal

== Italy ==
- 1907: Dorando Pietri
- 1908: Pericle Pagliani
- 1909: Ezio Cappellini
- 1910: Giuseppe Cattro
- 1911: Alfonso Orlando
- 1912: Alfonso Orlando (2)
- 1913: Oreste Luppi
- 1914: Primo Brega
- 1915–1918: not held
- 1919: Primo Brega (2)
- 1920: Carlo Speroni
- 1921: Carlo Speroni (2)
- 1922: Ernesto Ambrosini
- 1923: Ernesto Ambrosini (2)
- 1924: Angelo Davoli
- 1925: Giovanni Busan
- 1926: Angelo Davoli (2)
- 1927: Luigi Boero
- 1928: Luigi Boero (2)
- 1929: Luigi Boero (3)
- 1930: Nello Bartolini
- 1931: Corrado Franceschini
- 1932: Giuseppe Lippi
- 1933: Bruno Betti
- 1934: Salvatore Mastroieni
- 1935: Luigi Beccali
- 1936: Umberto Cerati
- 1937: Luigi Pellin
- 1938: Giuseppe Beviacqua
- 1939: Giuseppe Beviacqua (2)
- 1940: Giuseppe Beviacqua (3)
- 1941: Giuseppe Beviacqua (4)
- 1942: Giuseppe Beviacqua (5)
- 1943: Giuseppe Beviacqua (6)
- 1944: not held
- 1945: Alfredo Lazzerini
- 1946: Giovanni Nocco
- 1947: Giovanni Nocco (2)
- 1948: Giovanni Nocco (3)
- 1949: Mario Nocco
- 1950: Giovanni Nocco (4)
- 1951: Valentino Manzutti
- 1952: Giacomo Peppicelli
- 1953: Rino Lavelli
- 1954: Giacomo Peppicelli (2)
- 1955: Francesco Perrone
- 1956: Francesco Perrone (2)
- 1957: Gianfranco Baraldi
- 1958: Antonio Ambu
- 1959: Luigi Conti
- 1960: Luigi Conti (2)
- 1961: Antonio Ambu (2)
- 1962: Antonio Ambu (3)
- 1963: Luigi Conti (3)
- 1964: Antonio Ambu (4)
- 1965: Antonio Ambu (5)
- 1966: Renzo Finelli
- 1967: Antonio Ambu (6)
- 1968: Giuseppe Ardizzone
- 1969: Renzo Finelli (2)
- 1970: Giuseppe Ardizzone (2)
- 1971: Franco Arese
- 1972: Aldo Tomasini
- 1973: Aldo Tomasini (2)
- 1974: Giuseppe Cindolo
- 1975: Giuseppe Cindolo (2)
- 1976: Giuseppe Gerbi
- 1977: Venanzio Ortis
- 1978: Piero Selvaggio
- 1979: Mariano Scartezzini
- 1980: Alberto Cova
- 1981: Piero Selvaggio (2)
- 1982: Alberto Cova (2)
- 1983: Alberto Cova (3)
- 1984: Stefano Mei
- 1985: Alberto Cova (4)
- 1986: Stefano Mei (2)
- 1987: Ranieri Carenza
- 1988: Francesco Panetta
- 1989: Stefano Mei (3)
- 1990: Renato Gotti
- 1991: Stefano Mei (4)
- 1992: Renato Gotti (2)
- 1993: Giuliano Baccani
- 1994: Angelo Carosi
- 1995: Francesco Bennici
- 1996: Umberto Pusterla
- 1997: Simone Zanon
- 1998: Angelo Carosi (2)
- 1999: Luciano Di Pardo
- 2000: Gennaro Di Napoli
- 2001: Salvatore Vincenti
- 2002: Salvatore Vincenti (2)
- 2003: Salvatore Vincenti (3)
- 2004: Michele Gamba
- 2005: Simone Zanon (2)
- 2006: Cosimo Caliandro
- 2007: Daniele Meucci
- 2008: Daniele Meucci (2)
- 2009: Stefano La Rosa
- 2010: Stefano La Rosa (2)
- 2011: Stefano La Rosa (3)
- 2012: Stefano La Rosa (4)
- 2013: Stefano La Rosa (5)
- 2014: Marouan Razine
- 2015: Marouan Razine (2)
- 2016: Yassine Rachik
- 2015: Marouan Razine (2)
- 2016: Yassine Rachik (3)
- 2017: Marco Najibe Salami
- 2018: Marouan Razine (4)
- 2019: Marouan Razine (5)
- 2020: Ala Zoghlami
- 2021: Pietro Riva
- 2022: Yemaneberhan Crippa

== Japan ==
The information taken from JAAF website.

- 1970: Toshio Miyashita
- 1971: Ichio Sato
- 1972: Keisuke Sawaki
- 1973: Ichio Sato
- 1974: Yasunori Hamada
- 1975: Nobuaki Takao
- 1976: Toshiaki Kamata
- 1977: Hideki Kita
- 1978: Hideki Kita
- 1979: Tatsuya Moriguchi
- 1980: Hisatoshi Shintaku
- 1981: Hisatoshi Shintaku
- 1982: Hisatoshi Shintaku
- 1983: Hisatoshi Shintaku
- 1984: Kenji Ide
- 1985: Masami Otsuka
- 1986: Yutaka Kanai
- 1987: Douglas Wakiihuri (KEN)
- 1988: Haruo Urata
- 1989: Haruo Urata
- 1990: Thomas Osano (KEN)
- 1991: Brahim Boutayeb (MAR)
- 1992: Nobuo Hashizume
- 1993: Aloÿs Nizigama (BDI)
- 1994: Katsuhiko Hanada
- 1995: Hisayuki Okawa
- 1996: Yasunari Oba
- 1997: Simon Maina (KEN)
- 1998: Simon Maina (KEN)
- 1999: Julius Gitahi (KEN)
- 2000: Zakayo Ngatho (KEN)
- 2001: James Wainaina (KEN)
- 2002: Toshinari Takaoka
- 2003: Kazuyoshi Tokumoto
- 2004: Kazuyoshi Tokumoto
- 2005: Tomohiro Seto
- 2006: Takayuki Matsumiya
- 2007: Takayuki Matsumiya
- 2008: Takayuki Matsumiya
- 2009: Yuichiro Ueno
- 2010: Yuki Matsuoka
- 2011: Kazuya Watanabe
- 2012: Kazuya Deguchi

== Latvia ==
- 2008: Mareks Florošeks
- 2009: Valērijs Žolnerovičs
- 2010: Mareks Florošeks

== Lithuania ==
- 1921: L.Juozapaitis
- 1990: Vytautas Ežerskis
- 1991: Raimondas Juodeška
- 1992: Česlovas Kundrotas
- 1993: Raimondas Juodeška
- 1994: Bronius Basalykas
- 1995: Dainius Virbickas
- 1996: Egidijus Sabaliauskas
- 1997: Dainius Virbickas
- 1998: Darius Gruzdys
- 1999: Pavelas Fedorenka
- 2000: Mindaugas Pukštas
- 2001: Dainius Šaucikovas
- 2002: Egidijus Rupšys
- 2003: Linas Šalkauskas
- 2004: Marius Diliûnas
- 2005: Egidijus Rupšys
- 2006: Dainius Šaucikovas
- 2007: Tomas Matijošius
- 2008: Tomas Matijošius
- 2009: Robertas Geralavičius
- 2010: Tomas Matijošius

== Netherlands ==
- 1970: Gerard Tebroke
- 1971: Egbert Nijstad
- 1972: Egbert Nijstad
- 1973: Jos Hermens
- 1974: Jos Hermens
- 1975: Gerard Tebroke
- 1976: Gerard Tebroke
- 1977: Jos Hermens
- 1978: Klaas Lok
- 1979: Klaas Lok
- 1980: Klaas Lok
- 1981: Klaas Lok
- 1982: Klaas Lok
- 1983: Stijn Jaspers
- 1984: Marti ten Kate
- 1985: Rob de Brouwer
- 1986: Rob de Brouwer
- 1987: Tonnie Dirks
- 1988: Marti ten Kate
- 1989: Marti ten Kate
- 1990: Marcel Versteeg
- 1991: Marcel Versteeg
- 1992: Henk Gommer
- 1993: Henk Gommer
- 1994: Marcel Versteeg
- 1995: Kamiel Maase
- 1996: Kamiel Maase
- 1997: Kamiel Maase
- 1998: Marcel Versteeg
- 1999: Kamiel Maase
- 2000: Kamiel Maase
- 2001: Kamiel Maase
- 2002: Remco Kortenoeven
- 2003: Kamiel Maase
- 2004: Kamiel Maase
- 2005: Sander Schutgens
- 2006: Gert-Jan Liefers
- 2007: Michel Butter
- 2008: Sander Schutgens
- 2009: Michel Butter
- 2010: Thomas Poesiat
- 2011: Dennis Licht
- 2012: Abdi Nageeye
- 2013: Jesper van der Wielen
- 2014: Jesper van der Wielen
- 2015: Dennis Licht
- 2016: Dennis Licht
- 2017: Mohamed Ali
- 2018: Benjamin de Haan

== New Zealand ==
- 1970: J. Power
- 1971: Mike Ryan
- 1972: Dick Quax
- 1973: Dick Quax
- 1974: Dick Quax
- 1975: S. Melville
- 1976: B. Jones
- 1977: S. Melville
- 1978: Rod Dixon
- 1979: Rod Dixon
- 1980: Rod Dixon
- 1981: Rod Dixon
- 1982: Tom Birnie
- 1983: John Bowden
- 1984: Peter Renner
- 1985: Rex Wilson
- 1986: David Rush
- 1987: David Rush
- 1988: Phil Clode
- 1989: Peter Renner
- 1990: Kerry Rodger
- 1991: Sean Wade
- 1992: David Rush
- 1993: Paul Smith
- 1994: Phil Clode
- 1995: Jonathan Wyatt
- 1996: Robbie Johnston
- 1997: Jason Cameron
- 1998: Alan Bunce
- 1999: Richard Potts
- 2000: Richard Potts
- 2001: Jonathan Wyatt
- 2002: Hamish Christensen
- 2003: Phil Costley
- 2004: John Henwood
- 2005: Dale Warrander
- 2006: Ben Ruthe
- 2007: Rees Buck
- 2008: Jason Woolhouse
- 2009: Jason Woolhouse
- 2010: Matt Smith
- 2011: Nick Willis
- 2012: Nick Willis
- 2013: Hugo Beamish
- 2014: Malcolm Hicks
- 2015: Jake Robertson
- 2016: Hayden McLaren
- 2017: Daniel Balchin
- 2018: Oli Chignell

== Norway ==
- 1980: Anfin Rosendahl
- 1981: Knut Kvalheim
- 1982: Knut Kvalheim
- 1983: Stig Roar Husby
- 1984: Peder Arne Sylte
- 1985: Stig Roar Husby
- 1986: Are Nakkim
- 1987: Truls Nygaard
- 1988: Are Nakkim
- 1989: Are Nakkim
- 1990: Are Nakkim
- 1991: Eirik Hansen
- 1992: John Halvorsen
- 1993: John Halvorsen
- 1994: Bjørn Nordheggen
- 1995: Anders Aukland
- 1996: Jim Svenøy
- 1997: Jim Svenøy
- 1998: Kenneth Svendsen
- 1999: Øyvind Fretheim
- 2000: Øyvind Fretheim
- 2001: Knut Erik Rame
- 2002: Knut Erik Rame
- 2003: Marius Bakken
- 2004: Henrik Sandstad
- 2005: Marius Bakken
- 2006: Bård Kvalheim
- 2007: Bård Kvalheim

== Poland ==
- 1970: Kazimierz Podolak
- 1971: Edward Łęgowski
- 1972: Bronisław Malinowski
- 1973: Bronisław Malinowski
- 1974: Henryk Nogala
- 1975: Bronisław Malinowski
- 1976: Jerzy Kowol
- 1977: Jerzy Kowol
- 1978: Jerzy Kowol
- 1979: Jerzy Kowol
- 1980: Ryszard Kopijasz
- 1981: Bogusław Psujek
- 1982: Bogusław Psujek
- 1983: Bogusław Mamiński
- 1984: Antoni Niemczak
- 1985: Wojciech Jaworski/Bogusław Psujek
- 1986: Bogusław Psujek
- 1987: Bogusław Mamiński
- 1988: Czesław Mojżysz
- 1989: Leszek Bebło
- 1990: Henryk Jankowski
- 1991: Michał Bartoszak
- 1992: Michał Bartoszak
- 1994: Michał Bartoszak
- 1994: Sławomir Kąpiński
- 1995: Jan Białk
- 1996: Waldemar Glinka
- 1997: Michał Bartoszak
- 1998: Piotr Gładki
- 1999: Piotr Gładki
- 2000: Piotr Drwal
- 2001: Leszek Biegała
- 2002: Dariusz Kruczkowski
- 2003: Radosław Popławski
- 2004: Michał Kaczmarek
- 2005: Radosław Popławski
- 2006: Michał Kaczmarek
- 2007: Henryk Szost
- 2008: Michał Kaczmarek
- 2009: Artur Kozłowski
- 2010: Radosław Kłeczek
- 2011: Łukasz Kujawski
- 2012: Radosław Kłeczek
- 2013: Artur Kozłowski
- 2014: Krystian Zalewski
- 2015: Krzysztof Żebrowski
- 2016: Krystian Zalewski
- 2017: Krystian Zalewski
- 2018: Krystian Zalewski
- 2019: Krystian Zalewski

== Portugal ==
- 1980: Fernando Miguel
- 1981: António Leitão
- 1982: Fernando Miguel
- 1983: Carlos Lopes
- 1984: Guilherme Alves
- 1985: Fernando Couto
- 1986: Domingos Castro
- 1987: Domingos Castro
- 1988: José Regalo
- 1989: Domingos Castro
- 1990: Dionísio Castro
- 1991: António Monteiro
- 1992: Fernando Couto
- 1993: Luís Jesus
- 1994: António Pinto
- 1995: José Regalo
- 1996: José Ramos
- 1997: José Ramos
- 1998: José Ramos
- 1999: António Pinto
- 2000: Domingos Castro
- 2001: José Ramos
- 2002: Ricardo Ribas
- 2003: Bruno Saramago
- 2004: Hélder Ornelas
- 2005: Rui Pedro Silva
- 2006: José Ramos
- 2007: José Rocha
- 2008: Leão Carvalho
- 2009: Rui Pedro Silva
- 2010: José Ramos
- 2011: Rui Silva
- 2012: Bruno Albuquerque

== Russia ==
- 1992: Andrey Tikhonov
- 1993: Andrey Tikhonov
- 1994: Andrey Tikhonov
- 1995: Vener Kashayev
- 1996: Farid Khayrullin
- 1997: Sergey Drygin
- 1998: Sergey Drygin
- 1999: Sergey Lukin
- 2000: Sergey Drygin
- 2001: Mikhail Yeginov
- 2002: Yuriy Abramov
- 2003: Mikhail Yeginov
- 2004: Sergey Ivanov
- 2005: Pavel Shapovalov
- 2006: Sergey Ivanov
- 2007: Aleksandr Orlov

== South Africa ==
- 1980: Samuel Leso
- 1981: Samuel Leso
- 1982: Matthews Temane
- 1983: Matthews Temane
- 1984: Stephens Morake
- 1985: Matthews Temane
- 1986: Matthews Temane
- 1987: Matthews Temane
- 1988: Matthews Temane
- 1989: Matthews Temane
- 1990: Thabang Baholo
- 1991: Meshack Mogotsi
- 1992: Anton Nicolaisen
- 1993: Shadrack Hoff
- 1994: Shadrack Mogotsi
- 1995: Hendrick Ramaala
- 1996: John Morapedi
- 1997: John Morapedi
- 1998: Meshack Mogotsi
- 1999: Hendrick Ramaala
- 2000: Whaddon Niewoudt
- 2001: Shadrack Hoff
- 2002: Norman Dlomo
- 2003: Frank Lekhwi
- 2004: Frank Lekhwi
- 2005: Coolboy Ngamole
- 2006: Tshamano Setone
- 2007: Morosi Boy Soke

== Soviet Union ==
- 1980: Dmitriy Dmitriyev
- 1981: Dmitriy Dmitriyev
- 1982: Dmitriy Dmitriyev
- 1983: Dmitriy Dmitriyev
- 1984: Vitaliy Tyshchenko
- 1985: Gennadiy Temnikov
- 1986: Mikhail Dasko
- 1987: Vitaliy Tyshchenko
- 1988: Vitaliy Tyshchenko
- 1989: Mikhail Dasko
- 1990: Mikhail Dasko
- 1991: Mikhail Dasko

== Spain ==
- 1980: Antonio Prieto
- 1981: Antonio Prieto
- 1982: Antonio Campos
- 1983: José Luis Adsuara
- 1984: José Manuel Albentosa
- 1985: José Manuel Albentosa
- 1986: Pere Arco
- 1987: Jaime López Egea
- 1988: Juan Carlos Paul
- 1989: José Luis Carreira
- 1990: José Luis González
- 1991: Abel Antón
- 1992: Abel Antón
- 1993: Abel Antón
- 1994: Anacleto Jiménez
- 1995: Enrique Molina
- 1996: Anacleto Jiménez
- 1997: Manuel Pancorbo
- 1998: Manuel Pancorbo
- 1999: Isaac Viciosa
- 2000: Yousef El Nasri
- 2001: Alberto García
- 2002: Alberto García
- 2003: Jesús España
- 2004: Carlos Castillejo
- 2005: Jesús España
- 2006: Jesús España
- 2007: Jesús España
- 2008: Jesús España
- 2009: Jesús España
- 2010: Jesús España
- 2011: Jesús España
- 2012: Manuel Ángel Peñas

== Ukraine ==
- 1992: Valeriy Chesak
- 1993: Yevhen Sirotin
- 1994: Valeriy Chesak
- 1995: Serhiy Lebid
- 1996: Serhiy Lebid
- 1997: Ihor Lishchynskyi
- 1998: Maksym Yanishevskyi
- 1999: Serhiy Lebid
- 2000: Serhiy Lebid
- 2001: Serhiy Lebid
- 2002: Dmytro Baranovskyy
- 2003: Serhiy Lebid
- 2004: Serhiy Lebid
- 2005: Vasyl Matviychuk
- 2006: Yevhen Bozhko
- 2007: Vasyl Matviychuk
- 2008: Vitaliy Rybak
- 2009: Serhiy Lebid
- 2010: Maksym Kryvonis
- 2011: Serhiy Lebid
- 2012: Mykola Labovskyi
- 2013: Oleksandr Borysyuk
- 2014: Ivan Strebkov
- 2015: Stanislav Maslov
- 2016: Artem Kazban
- 2017: Volodymyr Kyts
- 2018: Vasyl Koval
- 2019: Volodymyr Kyts
- 2020: Vasyl Koval

== United States ==
- 1970: Frank Shorter
- 1971: Steve Prefontaine
- 1972: Mike Keough
- 1973: Steve Prefontaine
- 1974: Dick Buerkle
- 1975: Marty Liquori
- 1976: Dick Buerkle
- 1977: Marty Liquori
- 1978: Marty Liquori
- 1979: Matt Centrowitz
- 1980: Matt Centrowitz
- 1981: Matt Centrowitz
- 1982: Matt Centrowitz
- 1983: Doug Padilla
- 1984: Sydney Maree
- 1985: Doug Padilla
- 1986: Doug Padilla
- 1987: Sydney Maree
- 1988: Doug Padilla
- 1989: Tim Hacker
- 1990: Doug Padilla
- 1991: John Trautmann
- 1992: John Trautmann
- 1993: Matt Giusto
- 1994: Matt Giusto
- 1995: Robert Kennedy
- 1996: Robert Kennedy
- 1997: Robert Kennedy
- 1998: Marc Davis
- 1999: Adam Goucher
- 2000: Adam Goucher
- 2001: Robert Kennedy
- 2002: Alan Culpepper
- 2003: Tim Broe
- 2004: Tim Broe
- 2005: Tim Broe
- 2006: Bernard Lagat
- 2007: Bernard Lagat
- 2008: Bernard Lagat
- 2009: Matt Tegenkamp
- 2010: Bernard Lagat
- 2011: Bernard Lagat
- 2012: Galen Rupp
- 2013: Bernard Lagat
- 2014: Bernard Lagat
- 2015: Ryan Hill
- 2016: Bernard Lagat
- 2017: Paul Chelimo
- 2018: Lopez Lomong
- 2019: Lopez Lomong

== See also ==
- List of 5000 metres national champions (women)
