= Barcelona Marathon =

Annual race in Spain held since 1978

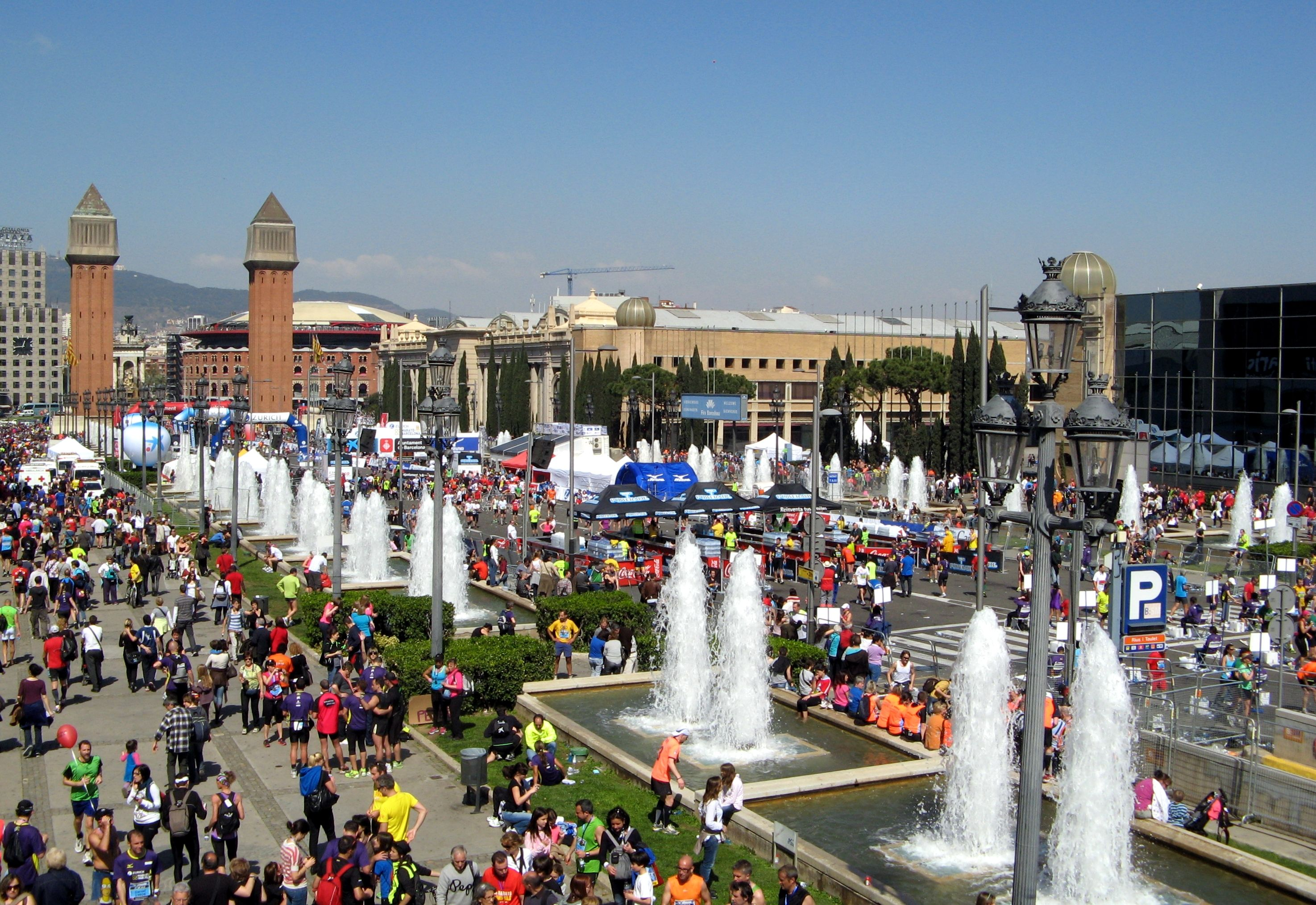
- Plaça d'Espanya, the start and finish area, in 2012
- Date: March
- Location: Barcelona, Catalonia, Spain
- Event type: Road
- Distance: Marathon
- Primary sponsor: Zurich
- Established: 1978 (48 years ago)
- Course records: Men: 2:04:13 (2025) (Ethiopia) Tesfaye Deriba; Women: 2:10:51 (2026) (Ethiopia) Fotyen Tesfay
- Website: Barcelona Marathon
- Participants: 5,410 finishers (2022); 9,145 finishers (2021); 13,437 (2019)

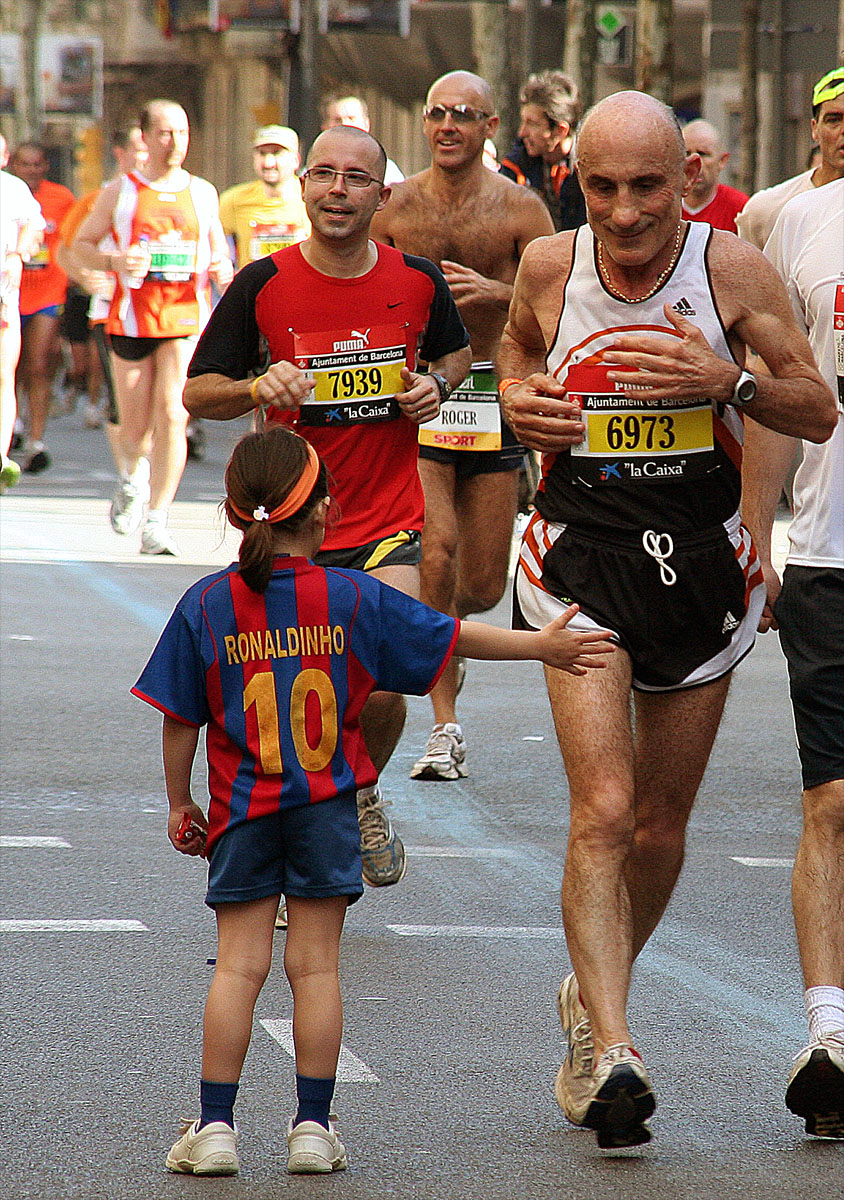
A young spectator in 2007

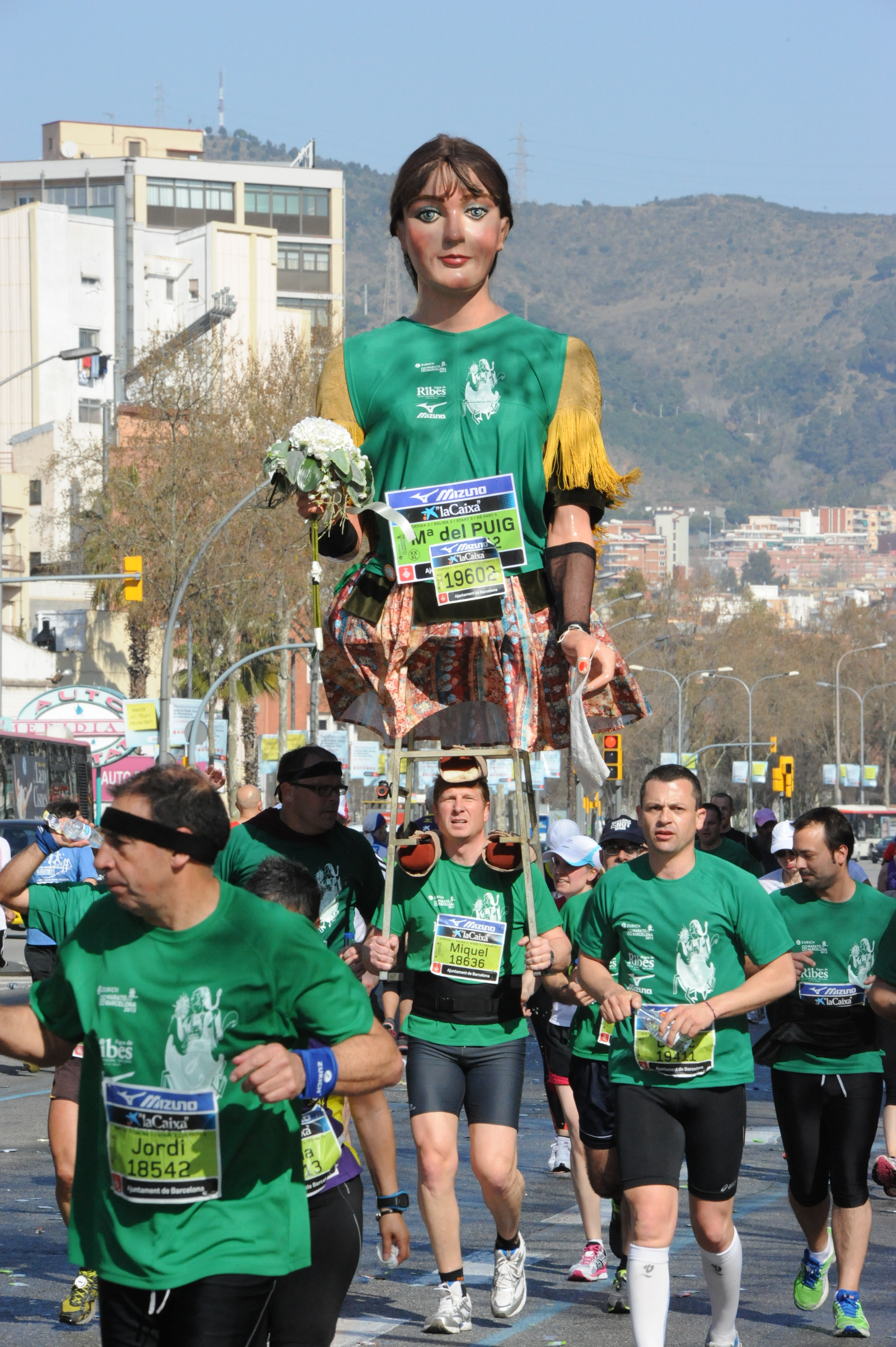
Runner carrying a giant prop, 2012

The Zurich Barcelona Marathon (Catalan: Marató Barcelona), formerly the Marathon Catalunya and later the Marató de Catalunya, is an annual marathon race over the classic distance of 42.195 km (26.219 mi) usually held in March in Barcelona, Catalonia, Spain, and first held in 1978 in Palafrugell, Catalonia. The marathon is categorized as a Silver Label Road Race by World Athletics.

== History ==
The marathon was first started by a Catalan chemist, Ramón Oliu, after he had run the New York City Marathon in 1976. Because there were no marathons in Catalonia at the time, Oliu decided to organize the first one in 1978. He held it in Palafrugell because he was unable to obtain a permit to hold it in Barcelona, and he named the race "Catalunya 78". This race also has the distinction of being the first popular marathon in Spain, as the Madrid Marathon was held later that same year.

The marathon was held in Palafrugell again in 1979 due to a lack of a Barcelonian permit, but was subsequently moved in Barcelona in 1980. The marathon eventually became known as the "Marathon Catalunya".

After a number of intermediate name changes, the name was eventually changed to "Zurich Marató de Barcelona" in 2012.

In 2010, Kenyan Jackson Kipkoech Kotut won the race in a time of 2:07:30 hours. This was a course record and also the fastest marathon ever run in Spain. Over 10,000 participants took part in the event that year.

The 2020 edition of the race was postponed due to the COVID-19 pandemic, with the event being rescheduled for 25 October 2020. Runners were also given the option of deferring their entry to the 2021 event, set to be held on 14 March 2021 instead of the revised 2020 date.

On 14 August 2020, the event was again cancelled, and is now set to return on 7 November 2021. Entrants are given the option of free entry in the new date with the possibility of running the half-marathon event in October for free also, or taking a refund, though as of 21 August 2020 many entrants report not having received any information about how to select from the alternative options. In March 2023, Àlex Roca Campillo, an athlete with cerebral palsy completed the Barcelona Marathon in five hours, 50 minutes and 21 seconds, becoming the first person with cerebral palsy to do so.

== Course ==
The route starts and finishes at Plaça d'Espanya, at the foot of Montjuïc, in the Sants-Montjuïc district. It passes Camp Nou, back to Plaça d'Espanya, past Sagrada Família, near the beach in northeast, around the old city, back to the shore and back to Plaça d'Espanya. It has many straight parts separated by sharp street corners. The route feels flat, but looks more hilly on a height profile diagram. It has some long slow inclines, notably around 25–27 km and 39–41 km.

The marathon course was changed for the 2019 edition of the race, resulting in both course records being broken that year. (Note: It was reported that the changes were made "in order to reduce the total elevation changes by more than 10%".)

== Winners ==
Key: Course record (in bold)

Ed.	Year	Men's winner	Time	Women's winner	Time	Rf.
1	1978	David Patterson (USA)	2:23:15	Matilde Gómez (ESP)	3:55:33	
2	1979	David Patterson (USA)	2:19:37	Matilde Gómez (ESP)	3:18:48	
3	1980	Don Faircloth (GBR)	2:19:42	Joaquima Casas (ESP)	3:09:53	
4	1981	Martin Knapp (GBR)	2:18:56	Icíar Martínez (ESP)	2:47:12	
5	1982	Michael Pinocci (USA)	2:14:30	Rita Borralho (POR)	2:46:58	
6	1983	Allan Zachariasen (DEN)	2:11:05	Anna Domoratskaya (URS)	2:48:21	
7	1984	Werner Meier (SUI)	2:14:50	Margaret Lockley (GBR)	2:41:42	
8	1985	Rafael García (ESP)	2:18:16	Joaquima Casas (ESP)	2:48:01	
9	1986	Frederik Vandervennet (BEL)	2:15:45	Deborah Heath (GBR)	2:48:22	
10	1987	Pär Wallin (SWE)	2:13:59	Joaquima Casas (ESP)	2:43:28	
11	1988	Fernando Díaz (ESP)	2:19:58	Deborah Heath (GBR)	2:45:35	
12	1989	Doug Kurtis (USA)	2:16:37	Martine van de Gehuchte (BEL)	2:37:41	
13	1990	Allan Zachariasen (DEN)	2:16:30	Elisenda Pucurull (ESP)	2:43:12	
14	1991	Kazuya Nishimoto (JPN)	2:16:32	Satoe Minegishi (JPN)	2:38:37	
15	1992	John Burra (TAN)	2:12:46	Maria Starovska (TCH)	2:34:07	
16	1993	Volmir Herbstrith (BRA)	2:13:25	Emma Scaunich (ITA)	2:36:16	
17	1994	Benito Ojeda (ESP)	2:15:14	Marina Ivanova (RUS)	2:40:30	
18	1995	Igor Tyazhkorob (RUS)	2:21:12	Núria Pastor (ESP)	2:44:19	
19	1996	Benito Ojeda (ESP)	2:16:57	Giselle Camilleri (MLT)	2:48:17	
20	1997	Abdeslam Serrokh (MAR)	2:12:53	Ana Isabel Alonso (ESP)	2:30:06	
21	1998	Abdeslam Serrokh (MAR)	2:09:48	Ana Isabel Alonso (ESP)	2:30:05	
22	1999	Daniel Komen (KEN)	2:16:24	Eva Sanz (ESP)	2:37:56	
23	2000	William Musyoki (KEN)	2:12:18	Griselda González (ESP)	2:31:12	
24	2001	Benedict Ako (TAN)	2:13:53	Leone Justino da Silva (BRA)	2:40:32	
25	2002	Benjamin Rotich (KEN)	2:12:07	Halyna Zhulieva (UKR)	2:40:33	
26	2003	Alberto Juzdado (ESP)	2:10:53	Kenza Wahbi (MAR)	2:38:36	
27	2004	Driss Lakhaouja (MAR)	2:15:59	Karin Schön (SWE)	2:42:54	
—	2005	not held due to issues with organizers				
28	2006	Joseph Nguran (KEN)	2:12:36	Haile Kebebush (ETH)	2:41:23	
29	2007	Johnstone Chebii (KEN)	2:12:04	Kristijna Loonen (NED)	2:42:03	
30	2008	Hosea Kosgei (KEN)	2:14:42	Mihret Tadesse (ETH)	2:42:17	
31	2009	Johnstone Chebii (KEN)	2:14:01	Tadelesh Debre (ETH)	2:39:43	
32	2010	Jackson Kotut (KEN)	2:07:30	Debola Wudnesh (ETH)	2:31:50	
33	2011	Levi Matebo (KEN)	2:07:31	Josephine Ambjörnsson (SWE)	2:45:31	
34	2012	Julius Chepkwony (KEN)	2:11:14	Emily Samoei (KEN)	2:26:53	
35	2013	Gezahegne Abera (ETH)	2:10:17	Lemelem Berha (ETH)	2:34:39	
36	2014	Getachew Abayu (ETH)	2:10:45	Frasiah Nyambura (KEN)	2:32:26	
37	2015	Philip Kangogo (KEN)	2:08:16	Aynalem Kassahun (ETH)	2:28:20	
38	2016	Dino Sefir (ETH)	2:09:31	Valerie Aiyabei (KEN)	2:25:26	
39	2017	Jonah Chesum (KEN)	2:08:56	Helen Bekele (ETH)	2:25:04	
40	2018	Anthony Maritim (KEN)	2:08:08	Ruth Chebitok (KEN)	2:25:46	
41	2019	Alemu Bekele (BHR)	2:06:04	Kuftu Tahir (ETH)	2:24:44	
—	2020	Cancelled due to the COVID-19 pandemic.				
42	2021	Samuel Kosgei (KEN)	2:06:03	Tadu Teshome (ETH)	2:23:53	
43	2022	Yihunilign Adane (ETH)	2:05:53	Meseret Gebre (ETH)	2:23:11	
44	2023	Marius Kimutai (BHR)	2:05:06	Zeineba Yimer (ETH)	2:19:44	
45	2024	Tadesse Abraham (SUI)	2:05:01	Degitu Azimeraw (ETH)	2:19:52	
46	2025	Tesfaye Deriba (ETH)	**2:04:13**	Sharon Chelimo (KEN)	2:19:33	
47	2026	Abel Chelangat (UGA)	2:04:57	Fotyen Tesfay (ETH)	**2:10:51**	

=== Multiple wins ===
Men's
Athlete	Wins	Years
David Patterson (USA)	2	1979, 1980
Allan Zachariasen (DEN)	2	1983, 1990
Benito Ojeda (ESP)	2	1994, 1996
Abdeslam Serrokh (MAR)	2	1997, 1998
Johnstone Chebii (KEN)	2	2007, 2009

Women's
Athlete	Wins	Years
Joaquima Casas (ESP)	3	1980, 1985, 1987
Matilde Gómez (ESP)	2	1978, 1979
Deborah Heath (GBR)	2	1986, 1988
Ana Isabel Alonso (ESP)	2	1997, 1998

=== By country ===
Country	Total	Men's	Women's
Kenya	19	14	5
Ethiopia	18	5	13
Spain	17	5	12
United Kingdom	5	2	3
United States	4	4	0
Morocco	4	3	1
Russia	2	1	1
Sweden	3	1	2
Denmark	2	2	0
Belgium	2	1	1
Japan	2	1	1
Switzerland	2	2	0
Tanzania	2	2	0
Brazil	2	1	1
Bahrain	2	2	0
Portugal	1	0	1
Czech Republic	1	0	1
Italy	1	0	1
Malta	1	0	1
Ukraine	1	0	1
Netherlands	1	0	1
Uganda	1	1	0

== See also ==
- Empúries Marathon
