= Àlex Roca Campillo =

Spanish Paralympic athlete (born 1991)

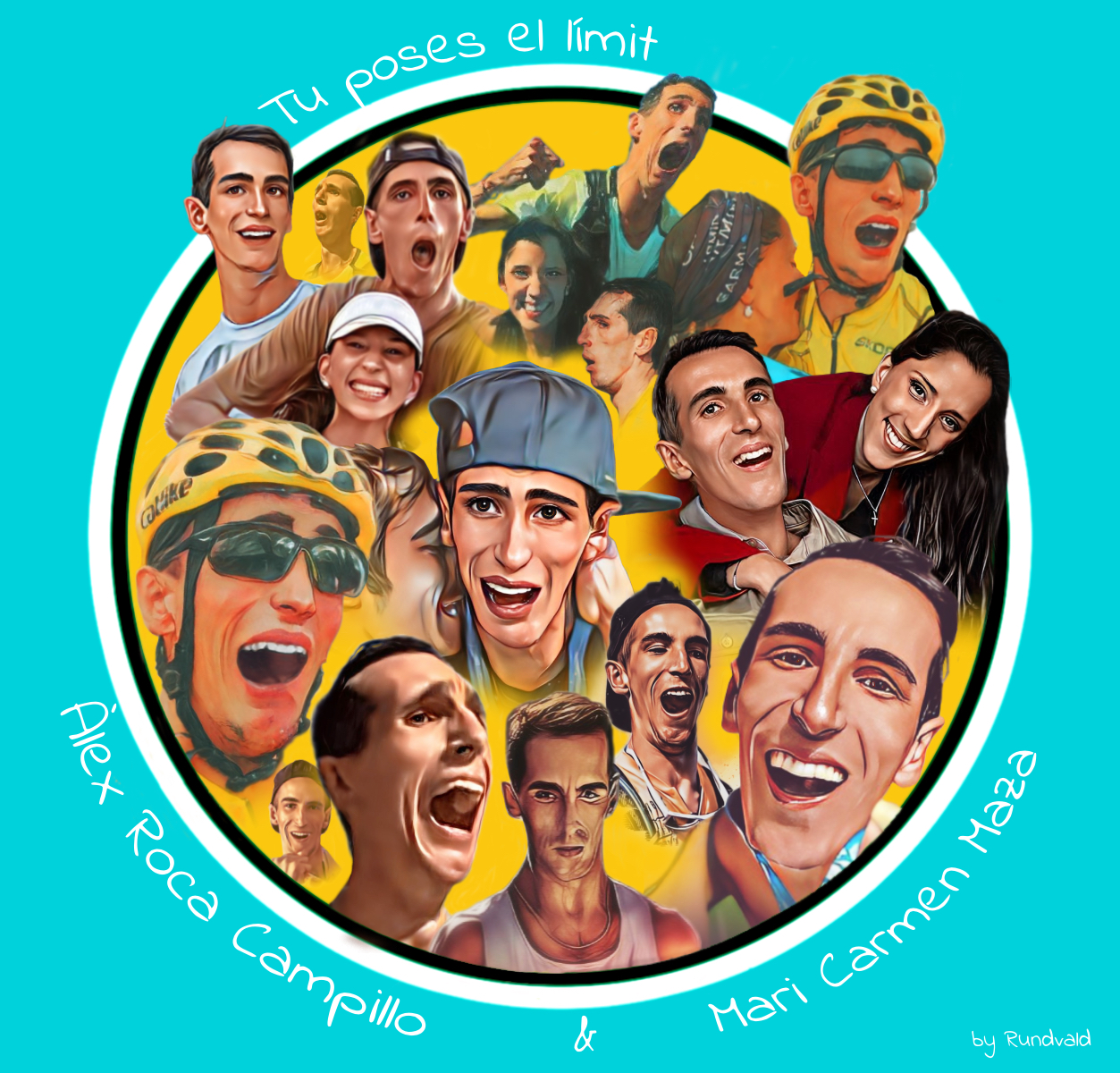
- Born: Àlex Roca Campillo; 1991 (age 34–35); Barcelona, Spain
- Occupation: athlete
- Known for: First 76% disabled person to finish a marathon.

Àlex Roca Campillo (born 1991) is a Spanish athlete with cerebral palsy. He made history in March 2023 by becoming the first person in the world with a 76 percent disability to finish a marathon of 42.195 km. As of June 2023, Roca serves as the ambassador for the FC Barcelona Foundation.

== Biography ==
Roca is from Catalonia, Spain. When Roca was six months old, he had brain herpes, which led to cerebral palsy; doctors didn't expect he would survive. He uses sign language to communicate because the left half of his body is less mobile. Roca has competed in various endurance events, including five triathlons. In 2019, he became the first person with cerebral palsy to complete Garmin's Titan Desert race, a six-day multi-stage mountain bike race over Morocco's Atlas Mountains and Sahara Desert. Roca has been an ambassador for the FC Barcelona Foundation since November 2021. On 19 March 2023, he completed the Barcelona Marathon, finishing the race in five hours, 50 minutes and 21 seconds, becoming the first person in history with cerebral palsy to do so.

Roca is married to Mari Carmen Maza whom he met in 2017 at one of the motivational conferences. She acts as his interpreter for people who do not know his sign language.
