= Artur Kozłowski =

Artur Kozłowski may refer to:

- Artur Kozłowski (speleologist) (1977–2011), Polish cave diver
- Artur Kozłowski (athlete) (born 1985), Polish long-distance runner
