= Jeff Schiebler =

Canadian long-distance runner

Personal information
- Born: June 1, 1973 (age 53) New Westminster, British Columbia, Canada

Sport
- Sport: Track and field
Medal record
Men's Athletics
Representing Canada
Pan American Games
Bronze medal – third place	1999 Winnipeg	5000 metres

Jeff Schiebler (born June 1, 1973) is a track and field athlete from Canada, who competes in the middle distance and long-distance running events. He represented his native country at two consecutive Summer Olympics, in 1996 and 2000.

A five-time national champion in the men's 5,000 metres, Schiebler won the bronze medal in the same event at the 1999 Pan American Games in Winnipeg. He still holds the Canadian High School Record of 14:35.06 set in 1990.

== See also ==
- Canadian records in track and field
