= Martin Knapp =

British economist

Martin Richard John Knapp CBE
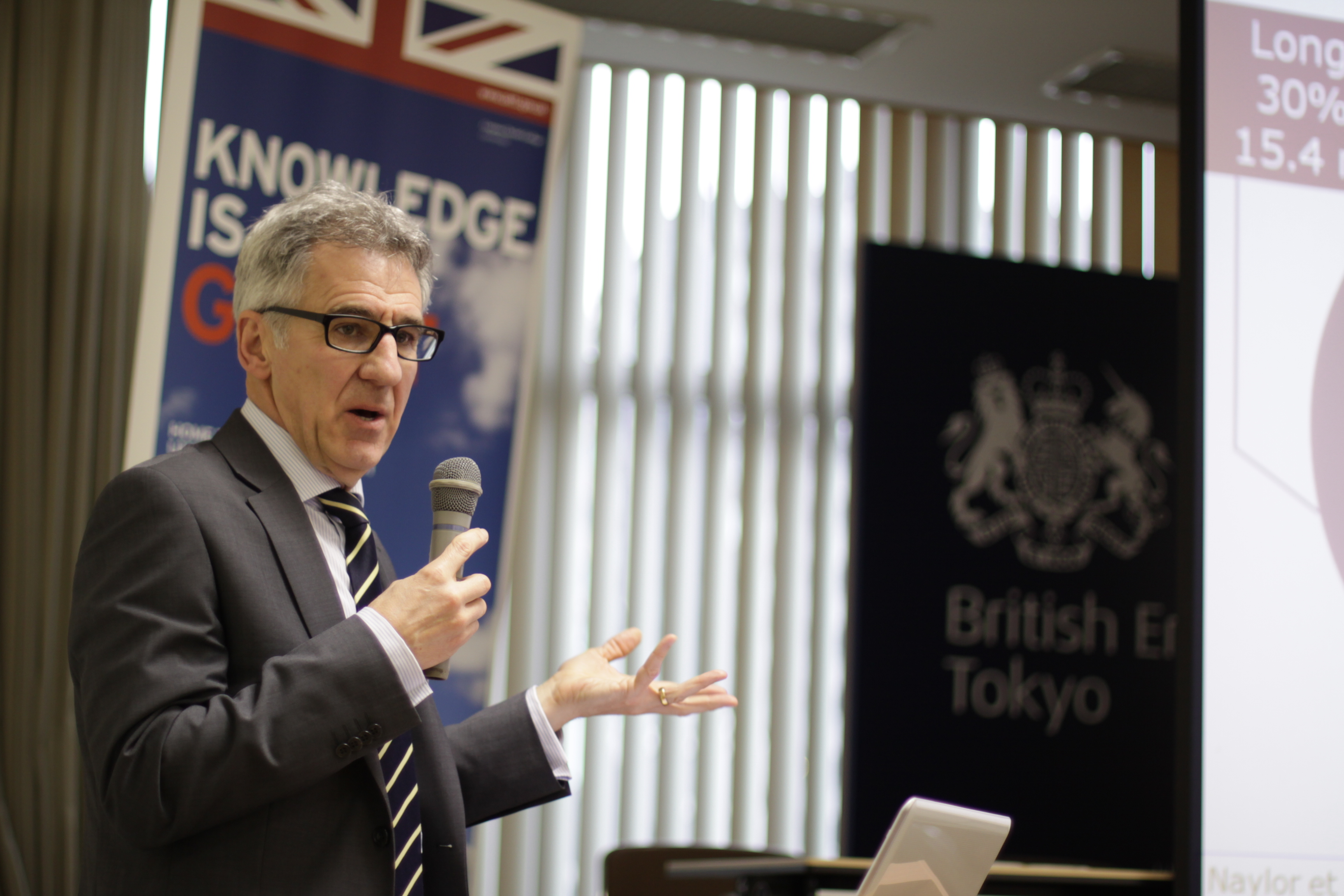
- Professor Martin Knapp, January 2014
- Born: August 8, 1952
- Title: Professor

Academic background
- Education: University of Kent (PhD) London School of Economics and Political Science (MSc) University of Sheffield (BSc)
- Thesis: Production relations for old people's homes (1980)

Academic work
- Institutions: London School of Economics and Political Science
- Main interests: Care policy, mental health policy

Martin Richard John Knapp, CBE (born 8 August 1952) is an economist and policy analyst whose research, teaching and consultancy activities are concentrated in the areas of health and social care. As well as being Director of the Personal Social Services Research Unit (PSSRU) at the London School of Economics, he is Professor of Social Policy and Chair of LSE Health and Social Care. He also holds appointments as Professor of Health Economics and Director of the Centre for the Economics of Mental Health at the Institute of Psychiatry, King's College London, and has an honorary professorial positions in Hong Kong and the Czech Republic.

== Career and research ==
Knapp's research focuses on mental health economics and policy (including financing, patterns of provision, mental health and employment, social exclusion, cost-effectiveness evaluations and international comparisons), and social care policy and practice (including consumer-directed services, financing arrangements and evaluation of service initiatives). He has published widely in these, and other, subject areas. His publications include approximately 300 peer-reviewed journal articles, 140 book chapters, 15 books, 4 edited books, and numerous monographs.

He has been an advisor to many government departments and other bodies in the UK and elsewhere, and to international bodies such as the European Commission and World Health Organization. He was recently awarded one of the first 100 Senior Investigator Awards from the National Institute for Health and Care Research (NIHR).

Knapp was the inaugural Director of the NIHR School for Social Care Research, holding this role between 2009 and 2024. Knapp led on work undertaken by the LSE and commissioned by the Department of Health in England looking at the economic case for investing in mental health promotion and disease prevention. The report Mental Health Promotion and Mental Illness Prevention: the economic case edited by Martin Knapp, together with David McDaid and Michael Parsonage was published by the Department of Health in April 2011.

Knapp was appointed as a member of the World Dementia Council, established after the G8 dementia summit in London December 2013. The council aims to stimulate innovation, development and commercialisation of life enhancing drugs, treatments and care for people with dementia, or at risk of dementia, within a generation. The Council met for the first time on 30 April 2014.

Knapp is a chair of the Scientific Advisory Board of the Horizon 2020 project PECUNIA, aiming to establish standardised costing and outcome assessment measures for optimised national healthcare provision in the European Union.

Knapp was appointed Commander of the Order of the British Empire (CBE) in the 2022 New Year Honours for services to social care research.

== Athletics career ==
Knapp is a former England international runner, winning the 4th Barcelona marathon in 1981 at the age of 29 in a time of 2hrs 18 minutes and 56 seconds.

Knapp, running for Invicta A.C. won the 1979 Isle of Wight marathon in a time of 2 hours 23 minutes and 23 seconds.

Knapp also came second in the 1981 City of Aberdeen Milk Marathon, held 27 September, in a time of 2hrs 21 minutes and 30 seconds, losing out by just one second in a sprint finish to Max Coleby, an experienced Great Britain international.

While on vacation in the United States, Knapp also came third in the Manufacturers Hanover five-borough five-mile challenge run April 12, 1981 at Clove Lake Park in Staten Island, New York, in a time of 26 minutes and 21 seconds.

Knapp also won the 1984 Tunbridge Wells Half Marathon.
