= Matthews Temane =

South African runner (born 1990)

Matthews Temane (born 1960) is a South African runner, who excelled over both middle distance running and long distance running, winning some 17 national athletics titles from 1982 to 1989, including seven 5000 metre title, four cross country titles, three half marathon titles, and three 10 km titles and who unofficially bettered the World half marathon record.

== Career Highlights ==
For many athletics enthusiasts Temane epitomised South African distance running in the 1980s. His career was characterised by great versatility and constant racing, as his situation in apartheid-era South Africa, made international competition in his prime impossible. His career highlights include a famous mile victory over his world class countryman, Johan Fourie in Potchefstroom in March 1983 in a time of 3:55.4 at 1350 metres altitude and won an epic duel in July 1987 against the then South African marathon record holder, Zithulele Sinqe in East London in July 1987 in an unofficial world best world record time of 60:11.

== Personality and Running Profile ==
Temane is one of the most decorated athletes in South African history. When tested in the laboratory of the Sports Science institute under Professor Tim Noakes in 1987, Temane's VO2 max was 78ml O2.kg.min; his running economy (51.1 ml O2.kg.min at 17 km/h) was the same at that reported for Frank Shorter, and he was able to continue running for over a minute longer than any other athlete tested at the laboratory on the maximal treadmill test, including his rival, and world class miler, Johan Fourie. For a distance runner, Temane had a very fast kick which allowed him to win many of his races in the final stages.

He is reportedly a humble and modest person. Observers of the sport have also commented on the strong sense of spirituality, with his demeanour being described as 'saintly'.

== Origins And Early Sporting History ==
Temane was one of seven children born into a family of modest means in Phake Ratlhagana now in Mpumalanga Province near [Hammanskraal], 30 km, north of Pretoria, in Gauteng Province. Like many young boys, as a child growing up in Hammanskraal, Temane's initial goal was to become a professional soccer player. He got married in 1989 and blessed with three children, which he abandoned them without any food, clothes, shelter and a better education and he appeared on sowetan newspaper in 2013 February saying he is single and he doesn't have any children. In pursuit of a soccer career, he trained with the police recruits at the local Police Training Academy during their physical training sessions. It was nevertheless soon clear that Temane's greatest sporting talent lay in distance running. Over and above his enormous natural talent, Temane was building up a substantial endurance base, running a total of 15 km to and from high school every school day after moving to high school in 1977. He was encouraged in this by his mother, who had shown promise as an athlete herself as a young woman, and sensed her son's great promise as a distance runner. It was not long before the young Temane had the opportunity to test himself against South Africa's best distance runners.

== First Major Victory ==
He first came to prominence in April 1978 when, just a schoolboy, he defeated Matthews Batswadi, who in 1977 had been the first black South African athlete to obtain South African national sporting colours, known as Springbok Colours over 5000 metres. The victory occurred at an annual athletics meeting held then in Mmabatho then located in the homeland of Bophuthatswana, now the North West Province between school athletes and athletes from the gold mines, which was used by the mines to recruit promising young athletes into their ranks.

== Meets Coach Richard Turnbull At Kloof Gold Mine ==
After leaving school, he joined the Kloof Gold Mine near Carletonville to become a full time athlete, at the end of 1981. At a race at the mine grounds on 1 January 1982, Richard Turnbull, the mine's recreation officer was on hand to witness Temane's impressive athletic potential. This was the start of long and extremely successful athlete-coach relationship which almost immediately bore fruit when Temane won the South African 5000 metres title three months later in Stellenbosch April 1982 in 13:50.02 beating Gibeon Moshaba into second place. Such was the closeness of the relationship between the two men that Turnbull and Temane jointly decided to leave the Kloof Gold Mine for Anglo Gold Ashanti's Vaal Reefs Gold Mine to secure their employment future in order that the athlete-coach relationship could continue.

== Challenges Johan Fourie Over The Mile ==
With his greatest fellow South African athletes Sydney Maree and Matthews Motshwarateu out of South Africa on athletics scholarship at American universities, and bored by the lack of challenge posed his South African rivals over 5000 metres in apartheid-era sporting isolation, Temane started competing in the 1500 metres and mile at the end of 1982. At a specially staged mile race against Johan Fourie at the Ken McArthur Oval in Potchefstroom in March 1983, Temane scored a shock victory over Fourie, outkicking Fourie to win in 3:55.4. Temane also scored street mile victories over Fourie in Port Elizabeth in 1983 and on his birthday on 14 December 1986, when he won in an impressive 3:46.

== Greatest Victories ==
After his mile victory over Fourie in 1983, Temane's career highlights were his hard fought victory over superb junior, Terry Thornton in Stellenbosch in November 1986, when Thornton led him and Xolile Yawa most of the way, and pulled him to a South African 5000 metre record of 13:25.15, and his half marathon world best in East London in July 1987. On the latter occasion the race had been preceded by an unprecedented media build up and the nail-biting contest between Temane and rival, Zithulele Sinqe, more than lived up to the pre-race publicity. Both athletes were credited with a time of 60:11, with Temane the winner by the barest of margins, well under the then world-best of 60:43 of Kenya's Mike Musyoki, who had been a teammate of Matthews Motshwarateu at the University of Texas at El Paso.

== Career After Retirement From Elite Competition ==
He has been a recreation officer at the Oppenheimer stadium at Anglo-Gold Ashanti's Vaal Reefs Gold Mine near Orkney in the North-West province since 1984. He keeps close contact with many of the leading South African athletes of his generation and in December 2009 he helped locate his namesake and former rival, Matthews Batswadi, who had been living in seclusion for 25 years at his ancestral village of Dithakong, in the North West Province, near Kuruman.
