= Matthew Centrowitz =

Matthew Centrowitz may refer to:

- Matt Centrowitz, Sr., (born 1955), American distance runner
- Matthew Centrowitz Jr. (born 1989), American distance runner, 2016 Olympic gold medalist and son of Matthew, Sr.
