= Dennis Jensen (runner) =

Danish long-distance runner

Dennis Jensen (born 11 September 1969) is a Danish retired long-distance runner who specializes in 5000 and 10,000 metres races. He represented Sparta.

Jensen won a number of medals at the Nordic Cross Country Championships: winning the competition in 2000 and taking the bronze in 1997, 1998 and 2001. He finished eleventh in the 10,000 metres at the 2002 European Championships. Jensen is a seven-time national champion (1997–2003) in the men's 5,000 metres.

== Personal bests ==
- 3000 metres - 7:52.09 min (2001)
- 5000 metres - 13:25.39 min (2000) - national record.
- 10,000 metres - 28:08.64 min (2002)
