= Matthews Batswadi =

South African distance runner

Maths Batswadi (born 1949), a South African athlete, was the first black athlete to be awarded Springbok Colours, the name then given to South African national sporting colours, after the implementation of the policy of apartheid by the National Party in 1948.

Batswadi received Springbok Colours in 1977 after the national athletics federation, the South African Amateur Athletics Association, deracialised its constitution to allow blacks and whites to compete against each other.

Batswadi won nine national titles from 1975 to 1980 and was renowned for his frontrunning tactics. He was born at Dithakong, near Vryburg in the Northern Cape Province, and retired from athletics competition in 1986.

His stadium record for the 10 000 metres of 28:46.8 at the Germiston Stadium in Ekurhuleni, set at the South African Athletics Championships in 1978, still stands. The Germiston Stadium is located at an altitude of 1600 metres above sea-level and the performance is thus noteworthy. The 1978 National Championships were also significant because it signalled the emergence of Batswadi's namesake, Matthews Motshwarateu, who won the 5000 metres in 14:07.

He won his first national title, the South African men's Cross Country Championships, in Roodepoort in 1975, while he was still working underground in the Western Deep Levels Gold Mine, then the deepest mine in the world. He went on to win a further eight national titles on the track, road and over cross country, with the 1980 SA Half Marathon Championships, being his final national title.

His attempt to run a marathon at the 1981 Sun City marathon was unsuccessful and he withdrew at 15 km.

His personal best time for the 5000m was 13:35 in 1978 and his 10 000m best was 28:00.72 set in Port Elizabeth in April 1980.

After many years in seclusion in Dithakong, Batswadi was located there in good health by another South African athletics great, also bearing the Christian name, Matthews, Matthews Temane in December 2009.
