= Zithulele Sinqe =

South African long-distance runner

Zithulele Sinqe (9 June 1963 – 22 December 2011) was a South African long distance runner.

== Biography ==
He was born in Mthatha. In the 1980s, and despite restrictions under apartheid, Sinqe emerged as one of the leading marathon and half-marathon athletes in the world. His two greatest races were the 1986 South African marathon championships, where he won in 2:08:04 in a titanic struggle with Willie Mtolo, who was second in 2:08:15. and his even closer contest over the half marathon with Matthews Temane in July 1987 in East London. Both men were credited with the same time of 60:11 but Temane was adjudged to have just defeated Sinqe.

In addition to the 1986 South African marathon championships, Sinqe also won the 1987 edition before Willie Mtolo won on two occasions. He competed at the 1992 Olympic marathon without finishing the race. 2:08:04 was also his lifetime best result. In the half marathon he achieved 1:00:11 hours in 1987, which was the world's best time that year, jointly with compatriot Matthews Temane. He won the Detroit Free Press Marathon in 1998. In his later years Sinqe also turned his attention to the Two Oceans Ultra Marathon (56 km) which he won in 1996 and 1997 as well as coming 2nd in 1998.
