= Paul Williams (runner) =

Canadian long-distance runner

Personal information
- Born: August 7, 1956 (age 69) Ottawa, Canada

Sport
- Sport: Track and field
Medal record
Representing Canada
Commonwealth Games
Bronze medal – third place	1990 Auckland	10,000m

Paul Gregory Williams (born August 7, 1956) is a Canadian retired long-distance runner, who represented his native country at three consecutive Summer Olympics, starting in 1984. His best result was finishing in 21st place in the men's 10,000 metres at the 1984 Summer Olympics in Los Angeles, California. Williams is a four-time national champion in the men's 5,000 metres.

== Career ==
Williams was born in Ottawa, Ontario, the second son to Robert and Dorothy (née Tait) Williams of Toronto.

Starting his career in the late 1960s as an age-class runner in the Beach community in Toronto's east end, he competed regularly in OFSSA track and cross-country competitions (from 1970–75) for Riverdale Collegiate with his older brother Don, and went on to a stellar athletics career at both the University of Guelph and the University of Toronto.

Williams matured quickly as a young distance runner, especially under the influence of two powerful role models in the sport. One was Bruce Kidd, Canada's premier distance runner through the 1960s and the gold medallist over 6 miles at the 1962 Commonwealth Games. His other hero was John Lindsay "Jack" Tait (1888-1971), Canada's champion miler of the British Empire in 1911, Canadian amateur middle-distance champion at 3 and 5 miles, world record holder indoors at 880 and 1000 yards, and a two-time Olympian in 1908 (London) and 1912 (Stockholm). Tait also happens to be Williams' grandfather.

Between 1979 and 1992, Williams held and/or broke several times the Canadian records for the 3,000 metre steeplechase, 3,0000 metres (7:46), 3,000 metres indoors (7:54), 5000 metres (13:22) and 10,000 metres (27:50). In 1984 his 27:55 10K performance made him the first Canadian ever to run under 28 minutes for 10,000 metres. In 1990, Williams won a bronze medal in the men's 10,000 metres at the Commonwealth Games (Auckland), and a gold medal in the Goodwill Games over 5,000 metres.

From 1983 to 2003, Williams was married to Lynn Kanuka, bronze medallist in the women's 3000 metres at the Los Angeles Olympics (1984), Commonwealth Games gold medallist in the women's 1,500 metres (1986), and former multiple Canadian middle-distance record holder.

Williams has owned and operated "Peninsula Runners", a popular running, general fitness and retail hub, since 1996 (www.penrun.ca). With locations in White Rock and Langley, 'PEN RUN' supports a multi-faceted community for training, fitness consulting and unique 1-to-1 retail relationships. He is also a co-founder and two-time winner of the massive Vancouver Sun Run 10K, and an official retailer to the event through the Sun Run Stores consortium (www.sunrunstores.com).

== See also ==
- Canadian records in track and field
