= Titan Desert =

Mountain bike race

Škoda Titan Desert
Race details
- Region: Moroccan desert
- Discipline: Off road
- Type: Stage race
- Web site: www.titandesert.es/en/home/

History
- First edition: 2006; 20 years ago
- Editions: 20 (as of 2026)

The Škoda Titan Desert is a six-day multiple stage mountain bike race held annually in Morocco since 2006 through the Moroccan desert between the Atlas Mountains and Sahara Desert. The competition was founded by Jaime Alguersuari Sr.'s RPM-MKTG, and in 2017 Amaury Sport Organisation joined as partner.

== Editions ==
=== 2018 ===
The thirteenth edition took place from April 29 to May 4, 2018. A route of 620 kilometers and 7,500 meters divided into 6 stages, starting in Boumalne Dades in a first stage in a loop, to finish the adventure in Maadid. An edition that broke numerous records: record of participants, with 612 bikers; record of finishers, with a total of 546 at the finish line; record of female participation, with 70 women in the adventure; and with more than 15% of foreign bikers from 24 countries. Josep Betalú, cyclist of the Doctore Bike Team - BMC got his third consecutive win. Second was Ramón Sagués and Robert Bou was classified in third position. In women's category, Ramona Gabriel won dominating all her rivals since the first day. Anna Ramírez, the current winner, finished second and the podium was completed by Veerle Cleiren.

=== 2019 ===
The Garmin Titan Desert 2019 took place from April 28 to May 3, 2019, in Morocco.

=== 2020 ===
The 2020 edition took place in Almería, Spain due to the COVID-19 pandemic.
