= Dithakong =

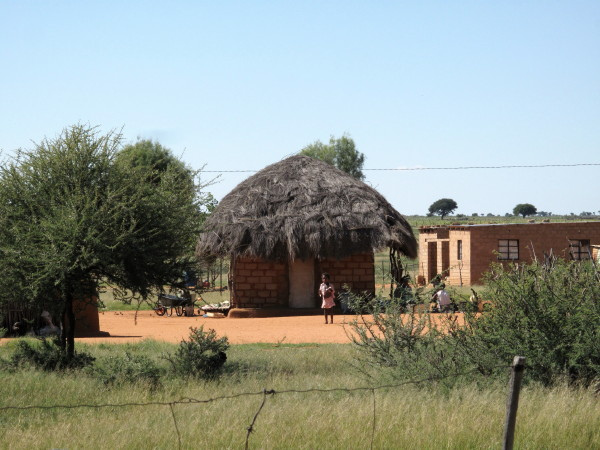
- A hut in Dithakong

- Location within Northern Cape Location within South Africa
- Coordinates: 27°05′S 23°51′E
- Country: South Africa
- Province: Northern Cape
- District: John Taolo Gaetsewe
- Municipality: Joe Morolong

Area
  - Total: 12.15 km^{2} (4.69 sq mi)

Population (2011)
  - Total: 1,691
  - Density: 139.2/km^{2} (360.5/sq mi)

Racial makeup (2011)
  - Black African: 99.4%
  - Indian/Asian: 0.3%
  - Other: 0.3%

First languages (2011)
  - Tswana: 96.3%
  - Other: 3.7%
- Time zone: UTC+2 (SAST)
- PO box: 8604

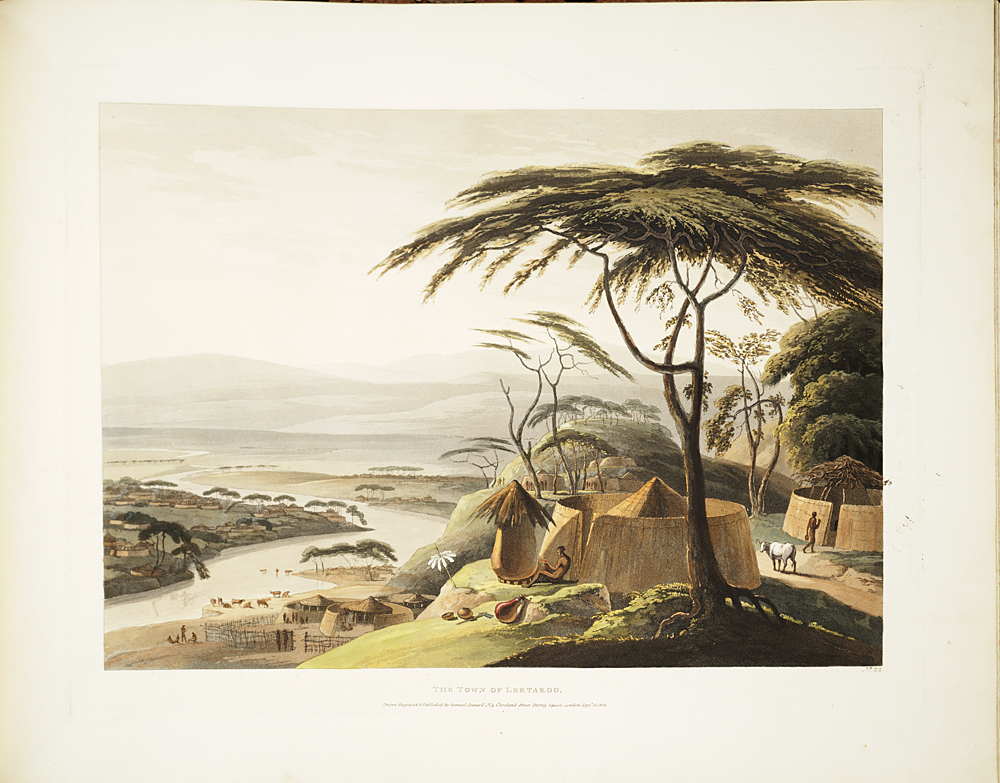
"The town of Leetakoo", 1801 painting by Samuel Daniell

Dithakong is a place east of Kuruman in the Northern Cape, South Africa, which had been a major destination for several of the earliest nineteenth century expeditions from the Cape to the interior of the subcontinent. In colonial literature, its name is often rendered in such ways as Litakun, also Litakoo or Lattakoo.

== Nineteenth century Tswana town ==
At the time of the 1801 Truter-Somerville Expedition Dithakong was an important BaTlhaping (BaTswana) capital under Kgosi ('Chief') Molehebangwe. Significant accounts of this first expedition were left by, amongst others, William Somerville and John Barrow, with well-known watercolour illustrations by Samuel Daniell. Kgosi Mothibi, son of Molehebangwe, had succeeded as leader of the BaTlhaping by the time that William Burchell visited there in 1811.

The early traveller accounts refer to an impressively large town consisting of mud houses, traces of which have yet to be located archaeologically.

The Battle of Dithakong in 1823 was part of the conflict and upheavals ending a period of strife referred to in the interior as the Difaqane, and is subject to debate following Cobbing's critique of once orthodox views of the Mfecane as a period of conflict generated by Zulu expansion.

According to the documentary El negre té nom, around 1830, taxidermist brothers Jules and Jean Baptiste Verreaux seized the corpse of San chief Molawa VIII and prepared it for display. The body was acquired in 1916 for a museum in Banyoles, Spain, where it was nicknamed the "Negro of Banyoles". It was removed from the museum in 1997 and buried in 2000 in Gaborone, Botswana.

Dithakong was later subjected to bombardment by colonial forces (under Charles Warren) suppressing a Tswana uprising in 1878.

== Battle of Dithakong ==
The Battle of Dithakong was fought on 24 June 1823 between Batlhaping and Griqua defenders against an alliance of BaFokeng, MaPhuting, and BaHlakoana invaders led respectively by Sebetoane, Tsooane, and Nkarahanye. The attacking nations had migrated in their entirety (civilians and cattle included) towards the area, seeking the well-irrigated town's cattle and grain to satisfy severe food shortages.

Messengers forewarned the Bathlaping, and the missionary Robert Moffat rushed from their capital of Kuruman to Griquatown to persuade the Griqua to assist the BaThlaping. Andries Waterboer, Barend Barends, and Adam Kok II agreed to ride northwards with about 200 men to join the BaTlhaping warriors.

About 200 Griqua horsemen, armed with guns, faced the massed ranks of the invaders armed with spears and cowhide shields. The BaTlhaping age regiments were held in reserve as the Griqua launched their attack.

Though the town itself had been burned, the invading alliance was routed, with Tsooane, Nkarahanye and several hundred others killed. Numerous BaFokeng, MaPhuting, and BaHlakoana civilians were captured and enslaved in the aftermath of the battle, and their cattle were seized.

== Earlier stone walled settlement ==
On adjacent hills are stone walled ruins, also referred to as Dithakong (meaning 'place of ruins'), about which Somerville enquired in 1801. The BaTlhaping claimed not to have known who had made or lived in this earlier town. Archaeological investigations have established Tswana affinities in this earlier settlement (itself showing more than one episode of development) which includes features indicative of frontier complexity at this south-western edge of Tswana expansion.

== Modern Dithakong ==
Dithakong today is a local centre in the Joe Morolong (formerly Moshaweng) Municipality of the John Taola Gaetsewe District Municipality.

Dithakong is the birthplace of Matthews Batswadi, the first black South African athlete to be awarded national sporting colours, known as Springbok Colours, after the institutionalisation of Apartheid by the Nationalist Party government following its election victory in 1948. Batswadi was born in the village in 1949 and has lived there ever since retiring from work at the Beatrix Gold Mine in the Free State and from active competition in 1986. He was awarded Springbok Colours in 1977 after racial discrimination was removed from the constitution of the then controlling body, the South African Amateur Athletics Union, thereby allowing blacks to receive national sporting colours.
