= Francesco Perrone =

Italian athlete (1930–2020)

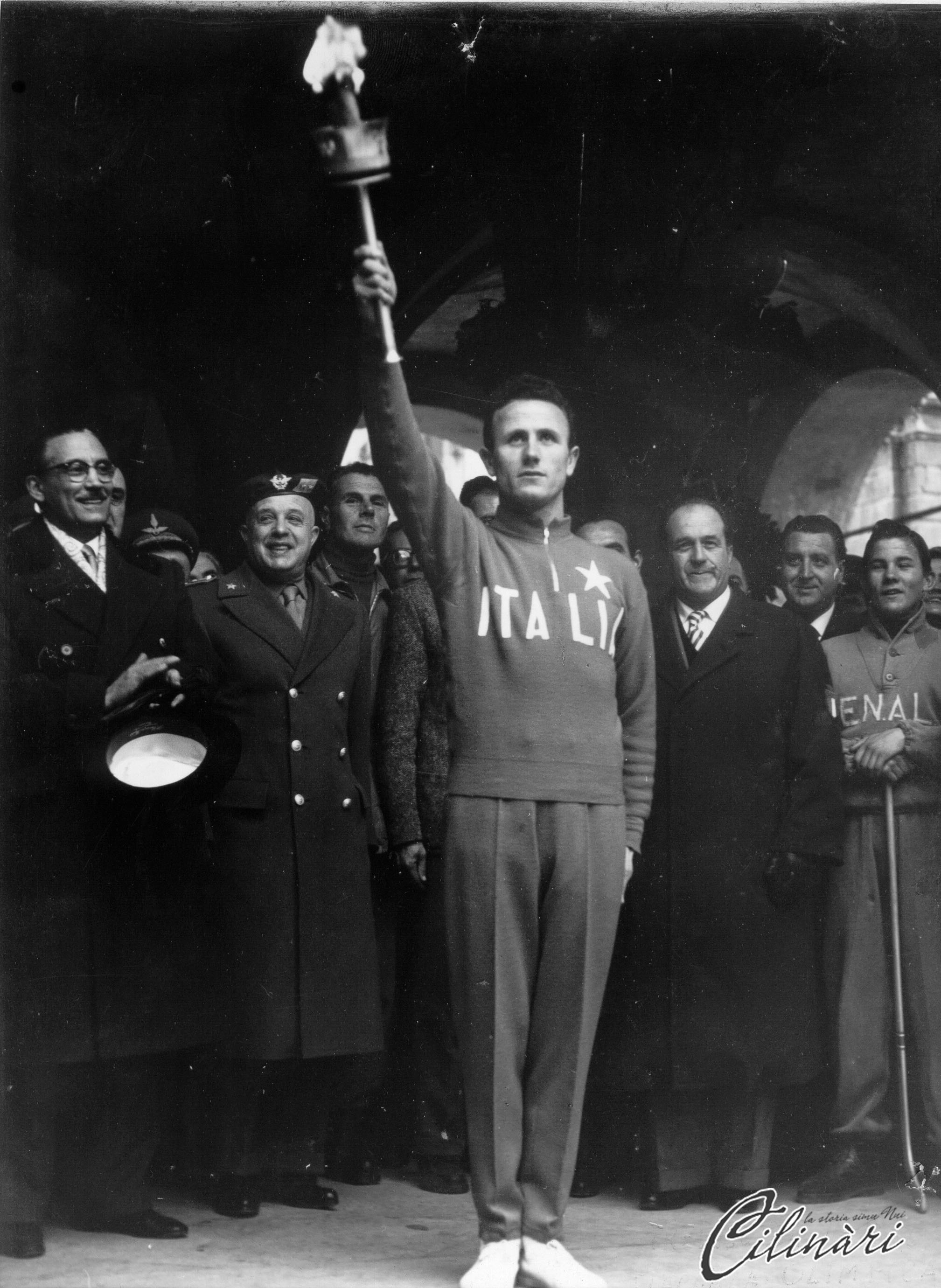
- Francesco Perrone at the 1960 Olympics

Personal information
- Nationality: Italian
- Born: 3 December 1930 Cellino San Marco, Italy
- Died: 27 April 2020 (aged 89) Bari, Italy

Sport
- Sport: Athletics
- Event: Marathon
- Club: G.S. Fiamme Oro

Francesco Perrone (3 December 1930 – 27 April 2020) was an Italian long-distance runner. He competed in the marathon at the 1960 Summer Olympics. Perrone was an athlete of the Gruppo Sportivo Fiamme Oro. Perrone died from COVID-19 during the pandemic in Italy on 27 April 2020 at the age of 89.
