= Empúries Marathon =

Coordinates: 42.1336°N 3.1212°E

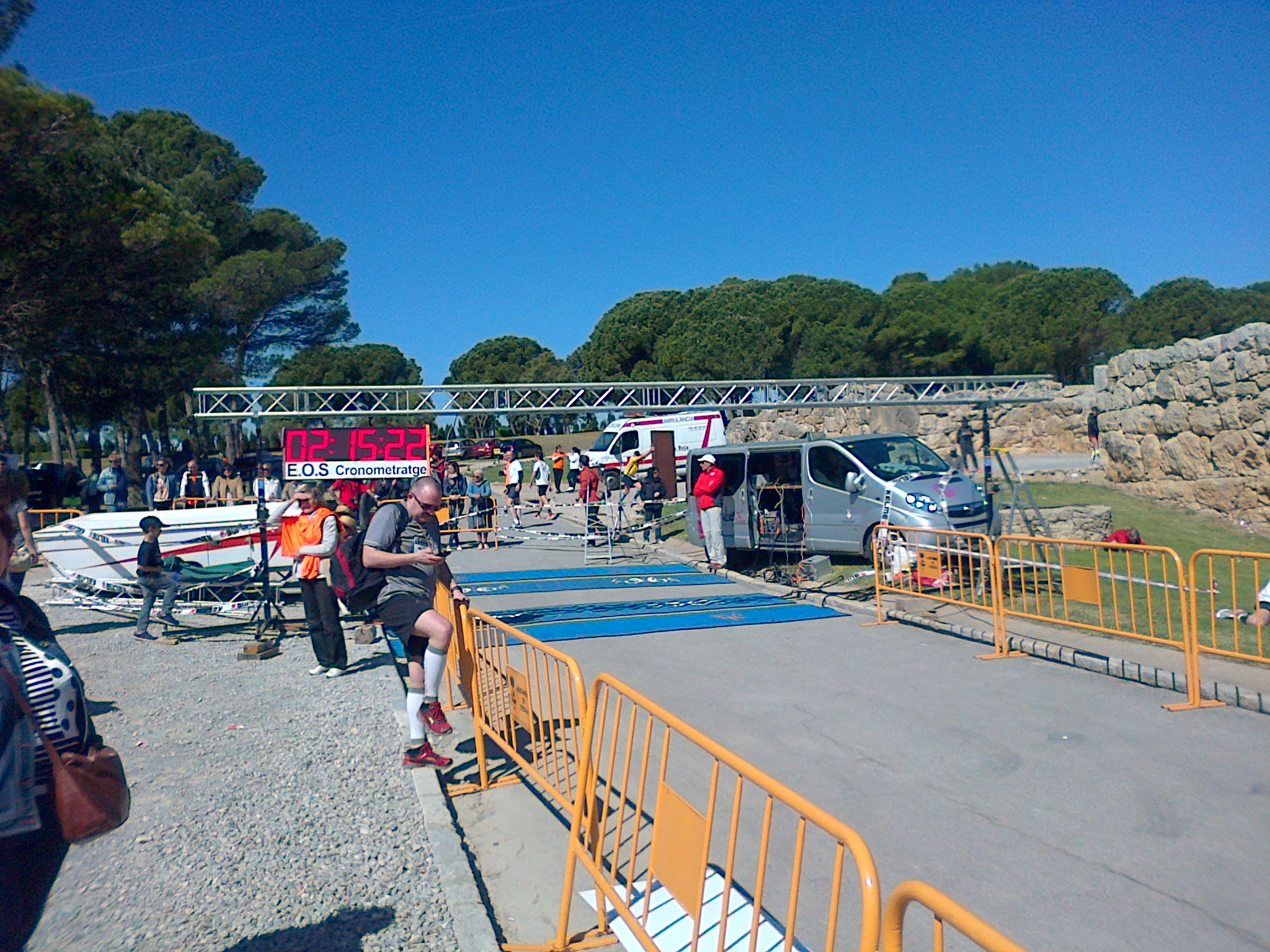
- 2014
- Date: April or May (since 2003)
- Location: L'Escala, Catalonia
- Event type: Road
- Distance: Marathon (42.195 km)
- Established: 2003
- Course records: 2:23:45 (men); 3:02:01 (women)

The Empúries Marathon (Catalan: Marató d'Empúries) is a long-distance run (42.195 km) which takes place in Empúries, the ancient Greek and Roman colony, next Sant Martí d'Empúries and L'Escala in Girona (Catalonia). The first edition of the marathon was held in 2003 to mark the collaboration of the City of L'Escala with the Universal Forum of Cultures in Barcelona 2004.

Organized by the L'Escala Town Council and with the support of the Catalan Athletics Federation, the Empúries Marathon is held annually in the month of April or May, along with two additional athletics races: the half-marathon and 10,000-meter race. With over 1,847 athletes for the three tests in 2013 edition, the start and finish are performed at the Archaeology Museum of Catalonia-Empúries, and, just before the race started, the runners cross the ancient Greek city of Empúries to the starting position.

== Winners ==
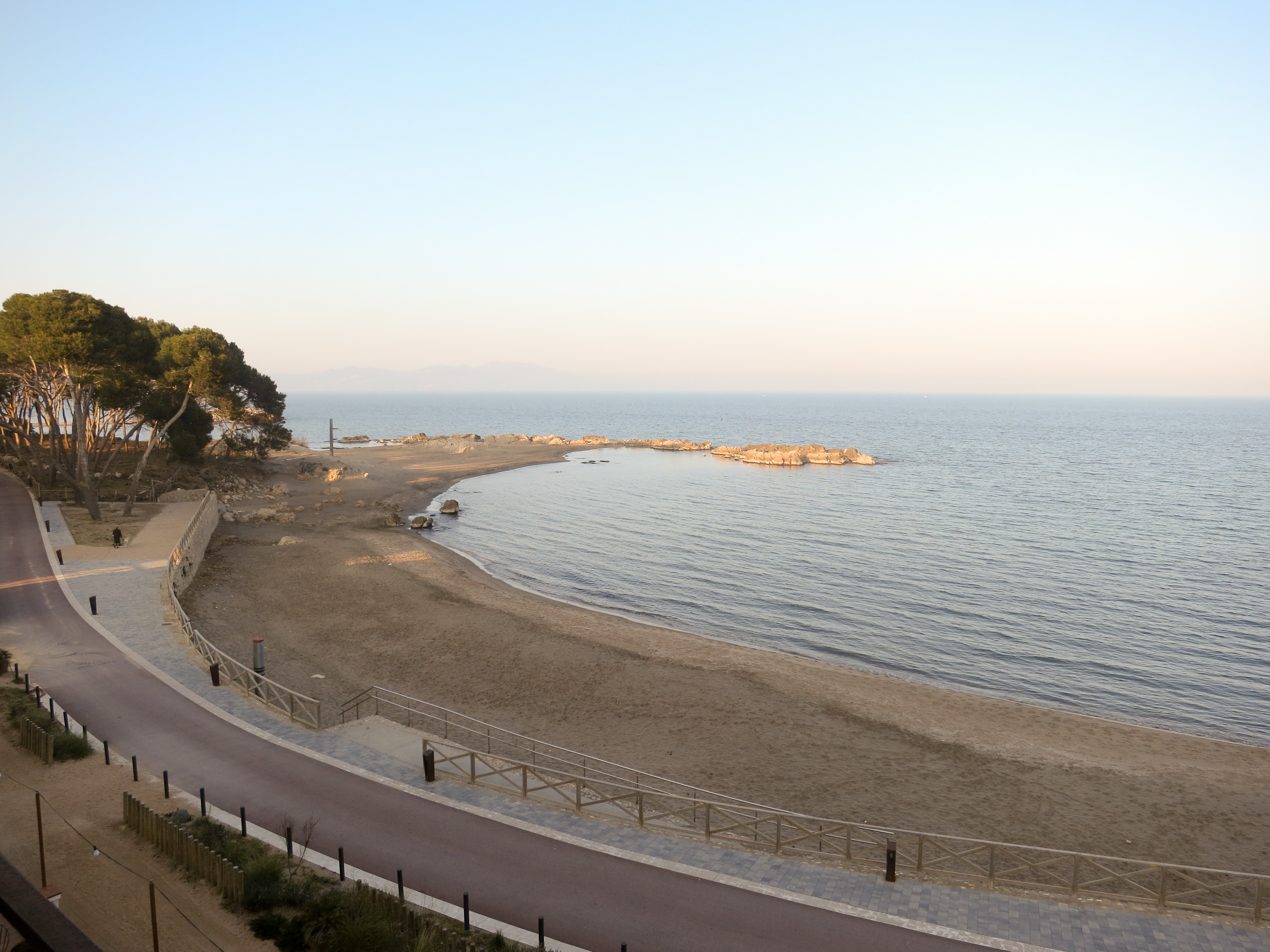
Les Muscleres beach (Empúries), next to the Empúries Marathon route

List of the winners of the Empúries Marathon.

The current course records of 2:23:45 (men) and 3:02:01 (women) are set in 2012 by Sergio Enriquez Castells and in 2006 by Anna Rosa Moreno respectively.

Key: Course record

Edition	Year	Winner male	Time (h:m:s)	Winner female	Time (h:m:s)
I	2003	Manuel López	2h 56' 07"	Meritxell Portillo Araujo	3h 22' 05"
II	2004	Albert Pascual	2h 32' 44"		
III	2005	Benito Ojeda Sanz	2h 34' 58"	Meritxell Portillo Araujo	3h 20' 54"
IV	2006	Victor González Guirao	2h 24' 02"	Anna Rosa Moreno	3h 02' 01"
V	2007	Benito Ojeda Sanz	2h 31' 33"	Anna Rosa Moreno	3h 07' 39"
VI	2008	Benito Ojeda Sanz	2h 30' 54"	Anna Rosa Moreno	3h 02' 36"
VII	2009	Ricard Verge Berrar	2h 36' 52"	Annette Geiken	3h 27' 18"
VIII	2010	Esteve Campmol Ametller	2h 40' 50"	Anna Rosa Moreno	3h 07' 50"
IX	2011	Ricard Verge Berrar	2h 33' 39"	Isabel Olivan Moreno	3h 16' 33"
X	2012	Sergio Enriquez Castells	2h 23' 45"	Antonia Hermoso Pua	3h 17' 20"
XI	2013	David Guiamet Redondo	2h 37' 44"	Paula Salgado	3h 09' 27"
XII	2014	David Guiamet Redondo	2h 34' 43"	Mireia Sosa Perez	3h 07' 05"
XIII	2015	Jordi Rabionet	2h 41' 41"	Pilar Sànchez	3h 09' 15"
