= Allan Zachariasen =

Danish long-distance runner

Allan Zachariasen (born 4 November 1955 in Odense, Syddanmark) is a retired long-distance runner from Denmark. He competed for his country in the men's marathon at the 1984 Summer Olympics, finishing in 25th place. He set his personal best in the classic distance (2:11.05) in 1983. Zachariasen is a five-time national champion in the men's 5,000 metres. He is the two-time winner of the Twin Cities Marathon, sweeping the first two years of the city-to-city course in the Twin Cities.

== Achievements ==
Year	Competition	Venue	Position	Event	Notes
Representing Denmark
1982	Twin Cities Marathon	Minneapolis, United States	1st	Marathon	2:11:49
1982	European Championships	Athens, Greece	—	Marathon	DNF
1983	Twin Cities Marathon	Minneapolis, United States	1st	Marathon	2:13:20
1984	Olympic Games	Los Angeles, United States	25th	Marathon	2:17:10
1987	World Championships	Rome, Italy	—	Marathon	DNF
