= Steve Austin (runner) =

Australian long-distance runner

Personal information
- Nationality: Australian
- Born: Stephen John Austin; 14 February 1951 (age 74)

Stephen John Austin (born 14 February 1951) is an Australian athlete. He competed in the 5000m and 10000m at the 1980 Summer Olympics.
