= Hubert Pärnakivi =

Estonian veterinarian and track and field athlete

Personal information
- Citizenship: Estonia; Soviet Union
- Born: October 16, 1932 Tallinn
- Died: October 28, 1993 (aged 61) Tartu
- Height: 176 cm (5 ft 9 in)
- Weight: 65 kg (143 lb)

Sport
- Sport: long-distance runner

Hubert Pärnakivi (16 October 1932 in Tallinn – 28 October 1993 in Tartu) was an Estonian track and field athlete (long-distance runner) and veterinarian.

1957 he graduated from Estonian Agricultural Academy in veterinary medicine.

1958 and 1959 he won several medals in Soviet Union Championships.

1952-1963 he become 28-times Estonian champion in different long-distance disciplines.

Personal bests: 800 m 1.54,1, 1000 m 2.30,7 (both in 1959), 1500 m 3.50,3 (1961), marathon 2:46.34,0 (1962).

Since 1963 he worked at Tartu Veterinary Hospital, 1977-1991 being the head of the hospital.
