= Dainius Virbickas =

Lithuanian long-distance runner (born 1971)

Dainius Virbickas (born 12 November 1971) is a retired Lithuanian long-distance runner.

== Life and career ==
Virbickas competed in the men's marathon event at the 1996 Summer Olympics in Atlanta, Georgia, where he didn't reach the finish line. The other two competitors for Lithuania in this event were Pavelas Fedorenka (70th place) and Česlovas Kundrotas, who also did not finish. His personal best was 2:15.28 hours, achieved in 1995.

Virbickas was born in Prienai, Lithuania. He was a three-time Lithuanian Athletics Championships winner in the 5000 m and a two-time indoor championships winner in the 3000 m. He also won the national cross country championships in 1990.

His wife is Jurgita Štreimikytė, a famous Lithuanian basketball player and coach. They have one son.

From 2013 to 2020, Virbickas was director of a Lithuanian basketball club.
