= Česlovas Kundrotas =

Lithuanian long-distance runner (born 1961)

Česlovas Kundrotas (born 3 January 1961 in Marijampolė) is a retired male long-distance runner from Lithuania. He competed for his native Baltic country in the men's marathon event at the 1996 Summer Olympics in Atlanta, Georgia, where he didn't reach the finish line. The other two competitors for Lithuania in this race were Pavelas Fedorenka (70th place) and Dainius Virbickas, who also did not finish. Kundrotas set his personal best in the men's marathon on 26 October 1997 in Frankfurt, clocking 2:12.35.

== Achievements ==
Year	Competition	Venue	Position	Event	Notes
Representing Lithuania
1993	Reykjavík Marathon	Reykjavík, Iceland	1st	Marathon	2:17:06
1994	European Championships	Helsinki, Finland	—	Marathon	DNF
1996	Olympic Games	Atlanta, United States	—	Marathon	DNF
1998	IAAF World Half Marathon Championships	Uster, Switzerland	86th	Half Marathon	1:05:59
2004	Vilnius Marathon	Vilnius, Lithuania	3rd	Marathon	2:34:20

== See also ==
- Lithuanian records in athletics
