= Pavelas Fedorenka =

Lithuanian long-distance runner (born 1964)

Pavelas Fedorenka (born 5 October 1964 in Anykščiai, Lithuania) is a retired male long-distance runner from Lithuania. He competed for his native Baltic country in the men's marathon event at the 1996 Summer Olympics in Atlanta, Georgia, finishing in 70th place (2:25.41). The other two competitors for Lithuania in this race, Česlovas Kundrotas and Dainius Virbickas, did not finish. Fedorenka set his personal best and national record in the men's 1,500 metres distance on 7 June 1987 in Moscow, clocking 3.40,90.

== Achievements ==
| Year | Competition | Venue | Position | Event | Notes |
Representing Lithuania
| 1992 | Lithuanian Athletics Championships | Vilnius, Lithuania | 1st | 1500 m | 3:47.93 (CR) |
| 1996 | Olympic Games | Atlanta, United States | 70th | Marathon | 2:25:41 |
| 1998 | IAAF World Half Marathon Championships | Uster, Switzerland | 87th | Half Marathon | 1:05:59 |

== See also ==
- Lithuanian records in athletics
