= Artur Kozłowski (runner) =

Polish long-distance runner

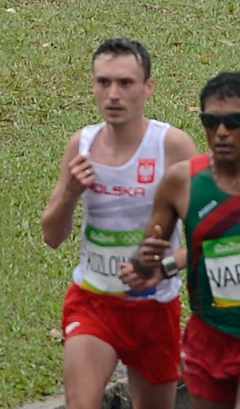
- Kozłowski at the 2016 Olympics

Personal information
- Born: 19 January 1985 (age 41) Sieradz, Poland
- Height: 169 cm (5 ft 7 in)
- Weight: 54 kg (119 lb)

Sport
- Sport: Athletics
- Event: 2000 m – marathon
- Club: MULKS MOS Sieradz
- Coached by: Zbigniew Rosiak

Achievements and titles
- Personal best(s): 2000 m – 5:13.50 (2009); 3000 m – 7:56.97 (2009); 5000 m – 13:46.66 (2009); 10,000 m – 28:48.74 (2009); HM – 1:03:36 (2009); 2:10:58 (2012)

Artur Kozłowski (born 19 January 1985) is a long-distance runner from Poland. He finished 39th in the marathon at the 2016 Olympics.

Kozłowski took up athletics around the age of 16. He has a degree in information technology from the University of Łódź. He is married to Paulina.
