= Athletics at the 1948 Summer Olympics – Men's 3000 metres steeplechase =

Men's 3000 metres steeplechase at the Games of the XIV Olympiad
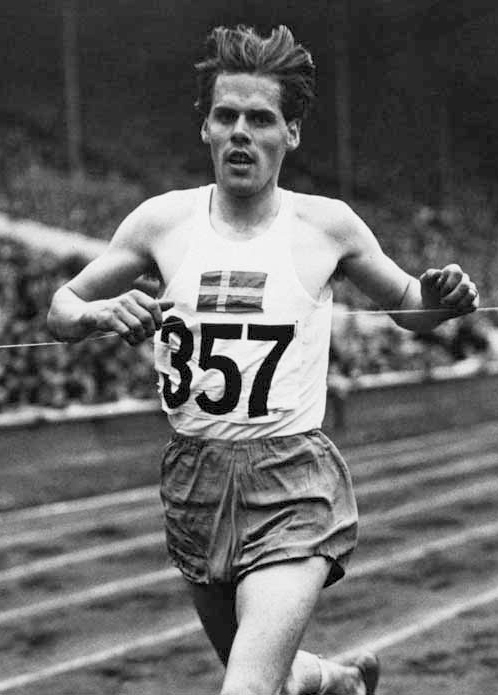
- Tore Sjöstrand
- Dates: 3 August 1948 (heats); 5 August 1948 (final)

Medalists
1st place, gold medalist(s)		Tore Sjöstrand; Sweden
2nd place, silver medalist(s)		Erik Elmsäter; Sweden
3rd place, bronze medalist(s)		Göte Hagström; Sweden

The men's 3000 metres steeplechase event at the 1948 Summer Olympic Games took place on 3 and 5 August. The final was won by Swede Tore Sjöstrand. Sjöstrand's compatriots, Erik Elmsäter and Göte Hagström took 2nd and 3rd place.

== Records ==
Prior to the competition, the existing Olympic records was as follows.

Volmari Iso-Hollo (FIN)	Olympic record	9:03.8	Berlin, Germany	8 August 1936

== Schedule ==
All times are British Summer Time (UTC+1).

Date	Time	
Tuesday 3 August 1948	16:15	Round 1
Thursday 5 August 1948	16:15	Final

== Results ==
=== Round 1 ===
Round 1 was held on 3 August. The first four runners from each heat advanced to the final.

Heat 1

Rank	Name	Nationality	Time (hand)	Notes
1	Erik Elmsäter	Sweden	9:15.0	Q
2	Alexandre Guyodo	France	9:17.2	Q
3	Pentti Siltaloppi	Finland	9:22.4	Q
4	Constantino Miranda	Spain	9:24.2	Q
5	Đorđe Stefanović	Yugoslavia	9:39.6	
6	John Doms	Belgium	9:41.8	
7	Peter Curry	Great Britain	–	
8	Bob McMillen	United States	–	
9	Vasilios Mavrapostolos	Greece	–	

Heat 2

Rank	Name	Nationality	Time (hand)	Notes
1	Raphaël Pujazon	France	9:20.8	Q
2	Göte Hagström	Sweden	9:22.6	Q
3	Petar Šegedin	Yugoslavia	9:25.0	Q
4	Browning Ross	United States	9:30.4	Q
5	Alf Olesen	Denmark	9:33.6	
6	Lucien Theys	Belgium	9:37.4	
7	Mustafa Özcan	Turkey	9:38.4e	
8	Paavo Toivari	Finland	–	
9	Geoffrey Tudor	Great Britain	–	
–	Jenő Szilágyi	Hungary	DNS	

Heat 3

Rank	Name	Nationality	Time (hand)	Notes
1	Tore Sjöstrand	Sweden	9:21.0	Q
2	Aarne Kainlauri	Finland	9:25.8	Q
3	Robert Everaert	Belgium	9:26.4	Q
4	Roger Chesneau	France	9:27.6	Q
5	Cahit Önel	Turkey	9:28.4	
6	Whitey Overton	United States	10:14.4	
7	Rene Howell	Great Britain	–	
8	Paul Frieden	Luxembourg	–	
–	László Jeszenszky	Hungary	DNS	
–	Wim Slijkhuis	Netherlands	DNS	

=== Final ===
Rank	Name	Nationality	Time (hand)	Time (auto)	Notes
1st place, gold medalist(s)	Tore Sjöstrand	Sweden	9:04.6	9:04.6	
2nd place, silver medalist(s)	Erik Elmsäter	Sweden	9:08.2	9:08.41	
3rd place, bronze medalist(s)	Göte Hagström	Sweden	9:11.8	9:12.14	
4	Alexandre Guyodo	France	9:13.6	9:13.52	
5	Pentti Siltaloppi	Finland	9:19.6	9:19.99	
6	Petar Šegedin	Yugoslavia	9:20.4	9:20.68	
7	Browning Ross	United States	9:24.1	9:24.02	
8	Constantino Miranda	Spain	9:26.6	9:26.60	
9	Robert Everaert	Belgium	9:28.2	9:28.64	
10	Aarne Kainlauri	Finland	9:29.0	9:31.49	
11	Roger Chesneau	France	9:30.2	9:32.05	
	Raphaël Pujazon	France	DNF		

Key: DNF = Did not finish
