= Dutch Cross Country Championships =

- Date: February–March
- Location: Various, Netherlands
- Event type: Cross country
- Distance: 12 km and 2.5 km for men 8 km and 2.5 km for women
- Established: 1919

The Dutch Cross Country Championships (Dutch: Nederlands kampioenschap veldlopen) is an annual cross country running organised by the Royal Dutch Athletics Federation that serves as the national championship for the sport in the Netherlands. It is usually held in February or March.

It was first held in 1919 for men only. A women's championship race was introduced in 1963. A men's short race was added to the programme in 1937 and a women's version was added in 1999. The latter races served as with national selection for that section at the IAAF World Cross Country Championships from 1998 to 2006.

Guest athletes from other nations occasionally compete at the competition, but are not eligible for the national title. Several guests have gone on to place first in the race. In the men's long race Ethiopian's Getaneh Tessema and Tadesse Woldemeskle took the 1995 and 1996 titles, respectively. Ukraine's Vitaliy Shafar won in 2011 and Ethiopia's Faisa Dame Tasama in 2007 and 2013. In the women's long race, Ethiopian Zewdnesh Ayele Belachu won the 2015 title and Ana Dulce Félix of Portugal won in 2012.

== Editions ==
=== Men ===
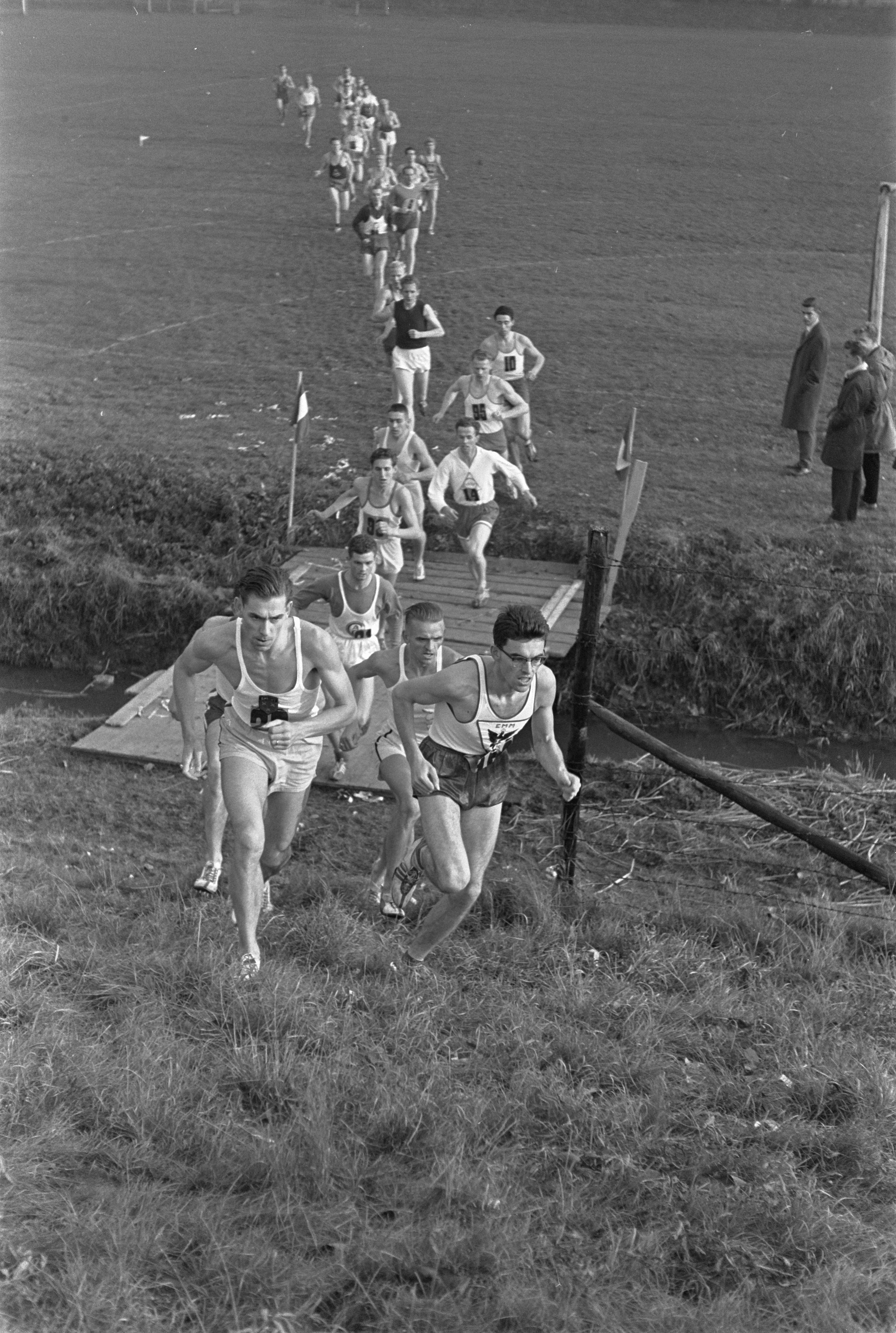
Frans Künen (left) and Hein Cujé (right) during the 1959 Dutch Cross Country Championships

Year	Date	Location	Long race winner	Distance	Time	Short race winner	Distance	Time
1919	10 August	Arnhem	Jan Postma	?	?	–	–	–
1920	5 September	Noordwijk	Jan Postma	4 km	14:50.4	–	–	–
1921	22 May	The Hague	Jan Postma	3.5 km	10:10.4	–	–	–
1922	15 October	The Hague	Piet de Boer	5 km	24:53.2	–	–	–
1923	2 December	The Hague	Jan Zeegers	4 km	12:41.8	–	–	–
1924	16 November	The Hague	Jan Zeegers	10 km	35:34.2	–	–	–
1925	15 November	Wassenaar	Jan Zeegers	10 km	35:10.1	–	–	–
1926	19 December	Wassenaar	Arie Klaasse	12 km	41:19.2	–	–	–
1927	18 December	Wassenaar	Jan Zeegers	10 km	33:21.2	–	–	–
1928	9 December	Wassenaar	Jan Zeegers	10 km	34:00.0	–	–	–
1929	15 December	Wassenaar	Jan Zeegers	10 km	33:53.6	–	–	–
1930	26 October	Wassenaar	Jan Zeegers	11 km	39:30.0	–	–	–
1931	29 March	Wassenaar	Jan Zeegers	10 km	37:24.1	–	–	–
1932	13 March	The Hague	Jan Zeegers	10 km	36:22.1	–	–	–
1933	12 March	The Hague	Jan Zeegers	10 km	33:47	–	–	–
1934	18 March	Amsterdam	Klaas Kok	11 km	37:30.8	–	–	–
1935	17 February	Amsterdam	Klaas Kok	11 km	38:08.3	–	–	–
1936	29 March	Amsterdam	Jan Zeegers	11 km	36:49	–	–	–
1937	21 March/26 December	Hilversum/Delft	Jan Zeegers	10 km	33:19.8	Jan Zeegers	5 km	16:50.9
1938	11 December/27 November	Rotterdam/Amersfoort	Jan Zeegers	10 km	38:08.6	Jan Zeegers	5 km	16:38.7
1939	2 April	Vught	Frits de Ruyter	5 km	15:50.8	–	–	–
1940	Cancelled due to World War II							
1941	16 March	Amsterdam	Joop Walther	5 km	15:43	–	–	–
1942	15 March	Hilversum	Frits de Ruyter	5 km	16:31.2	–	–	–
1943	11 March	Amersfoort	Willem Slijkhuis	5 km	18:04	–	–	–
1944–45	Cancelled due to food shortages							
1946	3 November/7 April	Amsterdam/Amersfoort	Willem Slijkhuis	10 km	34:18.6	Willem Slijkhuis	5 km	16:29.4
1947	20 April/7 April	Arnhem/Delft	Jaap Meijer	10 km	34:46.2	Willem Slijkhuis	5 km	17:13.7
1948	29 April/29 March	Almelo/Amersfoort	Willem Slijkhuis	10 km	33:07.0	Willem Slijkhuis	5 km	14:38.6
1949	24 April/20 March	Hattem/Amersfoort	Willem Slijkhuis	10 km	35:36.2	Jef Lataster	5 km	15:20.9
1950	26 February	Zwolle	Jef Lataster	10 km	36:13.2	Jef Lataster	5 km *	15:23.8
1951	4 March	Maastricht	Jef Lataster	12 km	43:06.2	Hans Huizinga	5 km *	17:10.0
1952	2 March	Rheden	Jan Adriaansen	13 km	48:24.8	Hans Harting	5 km *	16:36.6
1953	1 March	Oirschot	Jan Adriaansen	12 km	47:28.8	Jan Adriaansen	5 km *	18:46.4
1954	21 February	Heerlen	Jef Lataster	13 km	41:16.0	Will van Zeeland	5 km *	16:14.0
1955	6 March	Breda	Will van Zeeland	13 km	45:13.0	Will van Zeeland	5 km *	16:19.4
1956	19 February	Huis ter Heide	Frans Künen	14 km	48:37.2	Henk Viset	5 km *	16:16.2
1957	24 February	Arnhem	Henk Viset	13 km	45:11.0	Wim Roovers	5 km *	15:04.1
1958	2 March	Breda	Hein Cujé	14,100 m	48:40.0	Frans Künen	5 km *	15:01.3
1959	22 March	Nijmegen	Frans Künen	13,500 m	42.53.6	Frans Künen	5 km *	16.33.6
1960	28 February	best	Frans Künen	13,040 m	41:08.0	Hein Cujé	5 km *	15:35.7
1961	5 March	Dordrecht	Hein Cujé	12 km	35:30	Hein Cujé	5 km *	16:22.8
1962	11 March	Helmond	Frans Künen	12 km	43:34	-	-	-
1963	3 March	Heerlen	Joep Delnoye	10 km	30:23	Piet Beelen	5 km	15:29
1964	8 March	Vught	Henk Snepvangers	10 km	34:13	Bert Smit	5 km	17:11
1965	7 March	Lisse	Egbert Nijstad	10 km	28:18	Gijs de Bode	5 km	14:01
1966	6 March	Apeldoorn	No on den Oordt	10 km	30:26	Jan Zijderlaan	5 km	15:18
1967	5 March	Lisse	Piet Beelen	10 km	30:22	Piet Deelstra	5 km	15:43
1968	3 March	Helmond	Jan Zijderlaan	10 km	30:05	Gijs de Bode	5 km	16:25
1969	9 March	Tegelen	Jan Zijderlaan	10 km	29:42	Wim van Gerven	5 km	14:49
1970	1 March	Harderwijk	Haico Scharn	10 km	31:46	Bram Wassenaar	5 km	15:41
1971	7 March	Emmeloord	Egbert Nijstad	10.5 km	31.43	Pieter Vos	5250 m	16:17
1972	5 March	Dwingeloo	Jos Hermens	10 km	30:13	Pieter Vos	5 km	15:18
1973	8 February	Rhenen	Egbert Nijstad	10.5 km	31:42	-	-	-
1974	3 March	Nijmegen	Egbert Nijstad	9.9 km	31:57	-	-	-
1975	9 March	Reusel	Jos Hermens	12.3 km	40:25	-	-	-
1976	15 February	Amersfoort	Jos Hermens	12.45 km	38:58	-	-	-
1977	6 March	Westerhoven	Jos Hermens	12 km	39:20	-	-	-
1978	5 March	Stiphout	Jos Hermens	12.5 km	37:53	-	-	-
1979	4 March	Beek	Klaas Lok	11.5 km	37:04	-	-	-
1980	24 February	Hulst	Klaas Lok	11.67 km	35:.49	-	-	-
1981	8 March	Wassenaar	Klaas Lok	12 km	40:07	-	-	-
1982	28 February	Norg	Klaas Lok	12 km	35:39	-	-	-
1983	27 February	Eibergen	Cor Lambregts	11,620 m	36:25	-	-	-
1984	26 February	Bergen op Zoom	Klaas Lok	12 km	36:27	-	-	-
1985	3 March	Landgraaf	Klaas Lok	12.2 km	37:30	-	-	-
1986	2 March	Amsterdam	Tonnie Dirks	12.1 km	36:31	-	-	-
1987	1 March	Zeeland	Tonnie Dirks	12,405 m	38:21	-	-	-
1988	28 February	Landgraaf	Tonnie Dirks	12 km	37:49	-	-	-
1989	26 February	Landgraaf	Marti ten Kate	12.2 km	37:28	-	-	-
1990	25 February	Deurne	Tonnie Dirks	12.4 km	38:26	-	-	-
1991	3 March	Deurne	Tonnie Dirks	12.4 km	38:22	-	-	-
1992	1 March	Utrecht	Tonnie Dirks	12,450 m	37:38	-	-	-
1993	7 March	Harderwijk	Henk Gommer	11.7 km	36:08	-	-	-
1994	6 March	Wieringerwerf	Tonnie Dirks	12,300 m	38:25	-	-	-
1995	5 March	Wassenaar	Marcel Versteeg	11,190 m	35:01	Rik Bisschop	5240 m	16:56
1996	3 March	Tilburg	Greg van Hest	12 km	36:18	Remco Kortenoeven	5 km	15:18
1997	2 March	Apeldoorn	Kamiel Maase	12,300 m	37:04	Wouter Timmer	5200 m	16:12
1998	1 March	Asten	Kamiel Maase	12 km	36:15	Sander Schutgens	5 km	15:20
1999	7 March	Heerde	Greg van Hest	12,022 m	38:59	Marko Koers	4022 m	12:47
2000	5 March	Heythuysen	Marco Gielen	12.7 km	39:45	Sander Schutgens	4.1 km	12:12
2001	4 March	Kerkrade	Kamiel Maase	13,342 m	44:59	Gert-Jan Liefers	4768 m	15:20
2002	24 February	Amersfoort	Kamiel Maase	12 km	39:33	Eric van der Linden	5 km	16:39
2003	2 March	Harderwijk	Kamiel Maase	12 km	35:39	Gert-Jan Liefers	4 km	11:35
2004	29 February	Holten	Kamiel Maase	12 km	36:44	Gert-Jan Liefers	5 km	14:58
2005	27 February	Roggel en Neer	Kamiel Maase	11,850 m	36:42	Simon Vroemen	4900 m	14:59
2006	5 March	Norg	Kamiel Maase	12.1 km	36:57	Dennis Licht	4300 m	12:40
2007	24–25 February	Wageningen	Michel Butter	10.3 km	33:09	Tom Wiggers	2.5 km	7:36
2008	1–2 March	Gilze en Rijen	Michel Butter	10.2 km	31:17	Gert-Jan Liefers	3300 m	10:29
2009	28 February–1 March	Gilze en Rijen	Abdi Nageeye	10.2 km	32:02	Guus Janssen	3300 m	10:10
2010	6–7 March	Hellendoorn–Nijverdal	Khalid Choukoud	12 km	39:58	Guus Janssen	2685 m	8:29
2011	19–20 February	Hellendoorn–Nijverdal	Khalid Choukoud	12.055 m	39:04	Dennis Licht	2685 m	8:21
2011	26–27 November	Tilburg	Khalid Choukoud	10 km	30:42	Tijs Groen	2500 m	7:04
2012	24–25 November	Tilburg	Khalid Choukoud	10 km	30:33	Tijs Groen	2500 m	7:02
2013	23–24 November	Tilburg	Khalid Choukoud	10 km	30:11	Thijmen Kupers	2500 m	6:56
2015	17–18 January	Kerkrade	Khalid Choukoud	10.5 km	33:12	Nils Pennekamp	2600 m	8:05
2016	12–13 March	Oldenzaal	Tom Wiggers	11.6 km	36:02	Wouter Ploeger	2500 m	6:38
2017	4–5 March	Amsterdam	Jesper van der Wielen	10.8 km	33:59	Nils Pennekamp	2700 m	8:37
2018	10–11 March	Amsterdam	Edwin de Vries	12 km	43:27	Richard Douma	2500 m	8:38
2019	24–25 February	Kraggenburg	Frank Futselaar	12 km	33:31	Nick Marsman	2500 m	8:02

- Note: The short course race was held separately in several years: 1950 on 2 April in Amersfoort, 1951 on 15 April in Groningen, 1952 on 14 April in Arnhem, 1953 on 6 April in Wassenaar, 1954 on 28 March in IJmuiden, 1955 on 3 April in Helmond, 1956 on 8 April in Groningen, 1957 on 7 April in Vught, 1958 on 2 November in Oisterwijk, 1959 on 8 November in Dordrecht, 1960 on 16 October in Tuindorp Oostzaan, 1961 on 1 October in Gouda.

=== Women ===
Year	Date	Location	Long race winner	Distance	Time	Short race winner	Distance	Time
1932	2 December	The Hague	Dini de Gelder	3000 m	12:08.4	-	-	-
1963	3 March	Heerlen	Riet Slegers	1500 m	4:44	-	-	-
1964	8 March	Vught	Gerda Kraan	1500 m	5:28	-	-	-
1965	7 March	Lisse	Gerda Kraan	1500 m	4:48	-	-	-
1966	6 March	Apeldoorn	Ilja Keizer	1500 m	5:02	-	-	-
1967	5 March	Lisse	Anneloes Bosman	1500 m	6:21	-	-	-
1968	3 March	Helmond	Mia Gommers	2000 m	7:20	-	-	-
1969	9 March	Tegelen	Mia Gommers	2000 m	5:42	-	-	-
1970	1 March	Harderwijk	Anneke de Lange	3000 m	9:49	-	-	-
1971	7 March	Emmeloord	Berny Boxem-Lenferink	2600 m	10:05	-	-	-
1972	5 March	Dwingeloo	Berny Boxem-Lenferink	2500 m	8:23	-	-	-
1973	8 February	Rhenen	Anneke de Lange	3695 m	14:25	-	-	-
1974	3 March	Nijmegen	Anneke de Lange	3300 m	12:06	-	-	-
1975	9 March	Reusel	Claire Spauwen	3800 m	14:36	-	-	-
1976	15 February	Amersfoort	Joke van der Stelt	4210 m	15:03	-	-	-
1977	6 March	Westerhoven	Annie van Stiphout	4.3 km	16:13	-	-	-
1978	5 March	Stiphout	Annie van Stiphout	4500 m	15:39	-	-	-
1979	4 March	Beek	Annie van Stiphout	3990 m	14:18	-	-	-
1980	24 February	Hulst	Carla Beurskens	4460 m	15:23	-	-	-
1981	8 March	Wassenaar	Carla Beurskens	4500 m	16:17	-	-	-
1982	28 February	Norg	Carla Beurskens	4500 m	14:30	-	-	-
1983	27 February	Eibergen	Wilma Rusman	4660 m	16:54	-	-	-
1984	26 February	Bergen op Zoom	Carla Beurskens	4560 m	15:43	-	-	-
1985	3 March	Landgraaf	Carla Beurskens	4700 m	16:16	-	-	-
1986	2 March	Amsterdam	Carla Beurskens	4500 m	15:08	-	-	-
1987	1 March	Zeeland	Wilma van Onna	4500 m	16:08	-	-	-
1988	28 February	Landgraaf	Christine Toonstra	4900 m	18:30	-	-	-
1989	26 February	Landgraaf	Marian Freriks	4900 m	18:09	-	-	-
1990	25 February	Deurne	Marian Freriks	4900 m	16:58	-	-	-
1991	3 March	Deurne	Marian Freriks	4900 m	16:58	-	-	-
1992	1 March	Utrecht	Carlien Harms	4650 m	16:19	-	-	-
1993	7 March	Harderwijk	Irma Heeren	5.9 km	20:34	-	-	-
1994	6 March	Wieringerwerf	Grete Koens	6150 m	21:48	-	-	-
1995	5 March	Wassenaar	Helle Vullings	6065 m	21:59	-	-	-
1996	3 March	Tilburg	Mieke Aanen	6 km	20:50	-	-	-
1997	2 March	Apeldoorn	Grete Koens	6225 m	21:27	-	-	-
1998	1 March	Asten	Grete Koens	6 km	20:18	-	-	-
1999	7 March	Heerde	Nadezhda Wijenberg	5822 m	21:30	Anjolie Wisse	4022 m	15:38
2000	5 March	Heythuysen	Wilma van Onna	7.4 km	25:28	Grete Koens	4.1 km	14:13
2001	4 March	Kerkrade	Irma Heeren	7474 m	26:44	Yvonne van der Kolk	4768 m	18:48
2002	24 February	Amersfoort	Irma Heeren	7.5 km	29:39	Suzanne Wiertsema	3.5 km	14:31
2003	2 March	Harderwijk	Irma Heeren	7500 m	26:24	Anjolie Wisse	4000 m	13:33
2004	29 February	Holten	Anita Looper	6000 m	20:52	Adriënne Herzog	3000 m	10:30
2005	27 February	Roggel en Neer	Adriënne Herzog	6100 m	21:09	Lesley van Miert	2700 m	9:37
2006	5 March	Norg	Adriënne Herzog	8150 m	27:55	Lesley van Miert	3250 m	10:23
2007	24–25 February	Wageningen	Adriënne Herzog	6.7 km	24:41	Lesley van Miert	2.5 km	8:39
2008	1–2 March	Gilze en Rijen	Adriënne Herzog	6300 m	23:59	Anne van Es-van den Hurk	2100 m	7:37
2009	28 February–1 March	Gilze en Rijen	Miranda Boonstra	6300 m	23:03	Anne van Es-van den Hurk	2100 m	7:26
2010	6–7 March	Hellendoorn–Nijverdal	Miranda Boonstra	7990 m	29:29	Yvonne Hak	2685 m	9:42
2011	19–20 February	Hellendoorn–Nijverdal	Miranda Boonstra	7990 m	29:21	Lesley van Miert	2685 m	9:36
2011	26–27 November	Tilburg	Adriënne Herzog	8000 m	27:29	Anne van Es-van den Hurk	2500 m	7:57
2012	24–25 November	Tilburg	Adriënne Herzog	8000 m	27:45	Lesley van Miert	2500 m	8:01
2013	23–24 November	Tilburg	Sifan Hassan	8000 m	27:09	Evelien Ruijters	2500 m	8:08
2015	17–18 January	Kerkrade	Ruth van der Meijden	7400 m	26:34	Manon Kruiver	2600 m	9:20
2016	12–13 March	Oldenzaal	Ruth van der Meijden	7800 m	27:29	Manon Kruiver	2500 m	7:31
2017	4–5 March	Amsterdam	Andrea Deelstra	7200 m	25:34	Bo Ummels	? m	9:55
2018	10–11 March	Amsterdam	Andrea Deelstra	9000 m	36:07	Dagmar Smid	2500 m	10:12
2019	24–25 February	Kraggenburg	Jasmijn Lau	9000 m	29:48	Elisa de Jong	2500 m	9:22
