= 1949 International Cross Country Championships =

Running competition held in Ireland

- Organisers: ICCU
- Edition: 36th
- Date: March 26
- Host city: Dublin, Ireland (Republic of Ireland)
- Venue: Baldoyle Racecourse
- Events: 1
- Distances: 9 mi (14.5 km)
- Participation: 62 athletes from 7 nations

The 1949 International Cross Country Championships was held in Dublin, Ireland, at the Baldoyle Racecourse on March 26, 1949. A report on the event was given in the Glasgow Herald.

Complete results, medalists, and the results of British athletes were published.

== Medalists ==
Event	Gold		Silver		Bronze	
Individual
Men; 9 mi (14.5 km)	Alain Mimoun; France	47:50	Raphaël Pujazon; France	47:51	Charles Cérou; France	47:55
Team
Men	France	33	England	90	Ireland	123

== Individual Race Results ==
=== Men's (9 mi / 14.5 km) ===
Rank	Athlete	Nationality	Time
1st place, gold medalist(s)	Alain Mimoun	France	47:50
2nd place, silver medalist(s)	Raphaël Pujazon	France	47:51
3rd place, bronze medalist(s)	Charles Cérou	France	47:55
4	Steve McCooke	Ireland	47:59
5	Geoff Saunders	England	48:14
6	André Paris	France	48:27
7	Frank Aaron	England	48:32
8	Roger Petitjean	France	48:37
9	Constantino Miranda	Spain	48:46
10	Reg Gosney	England	48:48
11	Jose Coll	Spain	48:55
12	John Doms	Belgium	49:01
13	Mohamed Brahim	France	49:06
14	John Barry	Ireland	49:07
15	Andy Forbes	Scotland	49:14
16	Harry Hicks	England	49:15
17	Raymond Allix	France	49:16
18	Lucien Theys	Belgium	49:20
19	Patrick Fahy	Ireland	49:21
20	Willy De Neef	Belgium	49:22
21	Alexandre Guyodo	France	49:51
22	Ricardo Yebra	Spain	49:52
23	Johnny Marshall	Ireland	49:53
24	Marcel Vandewattyne	Belgium	50:02
25	Jack Carrick	England	50:03
26	Buenaventura Baldoma	Spain	50:04
27	Len Eyre	England	50:13
28	Pat Haughey	Ireland	50:15
29	Bobby Reid	Scotland	50:18
30	Gregorio Rojo	Spain	50:19
31	Doug Thompson	England	50:20
32	George Craig	Scotland	50:21
33	Jacques Vernier	France	50:27
34	Frans Wauters	Belgium	50:29
35	Don Appleby	Ireland	50:30
36	Manuel Polo	Spain	50:31
37	James Fleming	Scotland	50:40
38	Emile Renson	Belgium	50:41
39	Frans Smets	Belgium	50:47
40	Jim Flockhart	Scotland	50:48
41	Tom Walsh	Ireland	50:49
42	Patsy Fitzgerald	Ireland	50:56
43	Simon Aldazabal	Spain	51:03
44	Tom McNeish	Scotland	51:10
45	Jean Chapelle	Belgium	51:13
46	Maldwyn White	Wales	51:28
47	Mick Maleedy	England	51:51
48	James Reid	Scotland	51:54
49	Ivor Lloyd	Wales	52:14
50	John Andrews	Wales	52:16
51	Pedro Sierra	Spain	52:29
52	Albert Christian	England	52:33
53	William Butcher	Wales	53:35
54	Tom Stevenson	Scotland	53:47
55	Pat Wallace	Wales	54:46
56	Emmet Farrell	Scotland	55:03
57	Eddie Cooper	Wales	55:14
58	Tom Wood	Wales	55:32
59	H.F. Bull	Wales	55:52
—	Eric Williams	Wales	DNF
—	M. O'Connell	Ireland	DNF
—	Ernest Delaunois	Belgium	DNF

== Team Results ==
=== Men's ===
Rank	Country	Team	Points
1	France	Alain Mimoun; Raphaël Pujazon; Charles Cérou; André Paris; Roger Petitjean; Mohamed Brahim	33
2	England	Geoff Saunders; Frank Aaron; Reg Gosney; Harry Hicks; Jack Carrick; Len Eyre	90
3	Ireland	Steve McCooke; John Barry; Patrick Fahy; Johnny Marshall; Pat Haughey; Don Appleby	123
4	Spain	Constantino Miranda; Jose Coll; Ricardo Yebra; Buenaventura Baldoma; Gregorio Rojo; Manuel Polo	134
5	Belgium	John Doms; Lucien Theys; Willy De Neef; Marcel Vandewattyne; Frans Wauters; Emile Renson	146
6	Scotland	Andy Forbes; Bobby Reid; George Craig; James Fleming; Jim Flockhart; Tom McNeish	197
7	Wales	Maldwyn White; Ivor Lloyd; John Andrews; William Butcher; Pat Wallace; Eddie Cooper	310

== Participation ==
An unofficial count yields the participation of 62 athletes from 7 countries.

- Belgium (9)
- England (9)
- France (9)
- Ireland (9)
- Scotland (9)
- Spain (8)
- Wales (9)
