= 1951 International Cross Country Championships =

- Organisers: ICCU
- Edition: 38th
- Date: 31 March
- Host city: Caerleon, Monmouthshire, Wales
- Venue: Caerleon Racecourse
- Events: 1
- Distances: 9.25 mi (14.9 km)
- Participation: 71 athletes from 8 nations

The 1951 International Cross Country Championships was held in Caerleon, Wales, at the Caerleon Racecourse on 31 March 1951. A report on the event was given in the Glasgow Herald.

Complete results, medalists, and the results of British athletes were published.

== Medalists ==
Event	Gold		Silver		Bronze	
Individual
Men; 9.25 mi (14.9 km)	Geoff Saunders; England	54:07	Frank Aaron; England	54:48	Charles Cérou; France	55:05
Team
Men	England	47	France	54	Belgium	99

== Individual Race Results ==
=== Men's (9.25 mi / 14.9 km) ===
Rank	Athlete	Nationality	Time
1st place, gold medalist(s)	Geoff Saunders	England	54:07
2nd place, silver medalist(s)	Frank Aaron	England	54:48
3rd place, bronze medalist(s)	Charles Cérou	France	55:05
4	Walter Hesketh	England	55:08
5	André Paris	France	55:31
6	Mohamed Lahoucine	France	55:34
7	Lucien Theys	Belgium	55:41
8	Henri Lucas	France	55:45
9	Frans Herman	Belgium	55:49
10	Edward Hardy	England	55:50
11	Johnny Marshall	Ireland	55:51
12	Charlie Owens	Ireland	55:56
13	André Nollet	France	56:11
14	Alec Olney	England	56:13
15	Maurits van Laere	Belgium	56:14
16	Bertie Robertson	England	56:15
17	Jose Coll	Spain	56:38
18	Antonio Amoros	Spain	56:40
19	Jacques Varnoux	France	56:44
20	Charles Dewachtere	Belgium	57:17
21	John Doms	Belgium	
22	Roger Petitjean	France	
23	Bill Boak	England	
24	Tommy Tracey	Scotland	57:39
25	Mohamed Brahim	France	
26	Jaime Guixa	Spain	
27	Roger Serroels	Belgium	
28	Ron Williams	England	
29	Constantino Miranda	Spain	
30	Marcel Vandewattyne	Belgium	
31	Étienne Gailly	Belgium	
32	Bobby Reid	Scotland	58:26
33	Doug Rees	Wales	
34	Albert Chorlton	England	
35	Don Appleby	Ireland	
36	Francisco Irizar	Spain	
37	R. McCabe	Ireland	
38	Andy Forbes	Scotland	58:55
39	Alan Anderson	Ireland	
40	Siem Bobeldijk	Netherlands	
41	Patrick Fahy	Ireland	
42	Archie Gibson	Scotland	59:35
43	Tom Richards	Wales	
44	Emmet Farrell	Scotland	59:58
45	Kevin Maguire	Ireland	
46	Jimmy Ellis	Scotland	1:00:25
47	Leo Besters	Netherlands	
48	Staf Dobbelaere	Netherlands	
49	Eddie Bannon	Scotland	1:00:35
50	Jef Lataster	Netherlands	
51	Charlie Robertson	Scotland	
52	Jan Adriaansen	Netherlands	
53	John Edwards	Wales	
54	Dyfrigg Rees	Wales	
55	Alex Kidd	Scotland	1:00:30
56	Pie Meyers	Netherlands	
57	George Phipps	Wales	1:00:58
58	Adrianus van der Zande	Netherlands	
59	Pat Wallace	Wales	
60	André Deschacht	Belgium	
61	William Butcher	Wales	
62	E. Donnelly	Ireland	
63	Anthony Noonan	Wales	
64	José Quesada	Spain	
65	Dé Slegt	Netherlands	
66	Henk van der Veerdonk	Netherlands	
67	Miguel Revert	Spain	
68	Leonardo Vegas	Spain	
—	Lionel Billas	France	DNF
—	Eric Williams	Wales	DNF
—	M. Duane	Ireland	DNF

== Team Results ==
=== Men's ===
Rank	Country	Team	Points
1	England	Geoff Saunders; Frank Aaron; Walter Hesketh; Edward Hardy; Alec Olney; Bertie Robertson	47
2	France	Charles Cérou; André Paris; Mohamed Lahoucine; Henri Lucas; André Nollet; Jacques Varnoux	54
3	Belgium	Lucien Theys; Frans Herman; Maurits van Laere; Charles Dewachtere; John Doms; Roger Serroels	99
4	Ireland	Johnny Marshall; Charlie Owens; Don Appleby; R. McCabe; Alan Anderson; Patrick Fahy	175
5	Spain	Jose Coll; Antonio Amoros; Jaime Guixa; Constantino Miranda; Francisco Irizar; José Quesada	190
6	Scotland	Tommy Tracey; Bobby Reid; Andy Forbes; Archie Gibson; Emmet Farrell; Jimmy Ellis	226
7	Netherlands	Siem Bobeldijk; Leo Besters; Staf Dobbelaere; Jef Lataster; Jan Adriaansen; Pie Meyers	293
8	Wales	Doug Rees; Tom Richards; John Edwards; Dyfrigg Rees; George Phipps; Pat Wallace	299

== Participation ==
An unofficial count yields the participation of 71 athletes from 8 countries.

- Belgium (9)
- England (9)
- France (9)
- Ireland (9)
- Netherlands (9)
- Scotland (9)
- Spain (8)
- Wales (9)
