= 1950 International Cross Country Championships =

- Organisers: ICCU
- Edition: 37th
- Date: March 25
- Host city: Brussels, Belgium
- Venue: Hippodrome de Boitsfort
- Events: 1
- Distances: 9 mi (14.5 km)
- Participation: 88 athletes from 10 nations

The 1950 International Cross Country Championships was held in Brussels, Belgium, at the Hippodrome de Boitsfort on March 25, 1950. A report on the event was given in the Glasgow Herald.

Complete results, medalists, and the results of British athletes were published.

== Medalists ==
Event	Gold		Silver		Bronze	
Individual
Men; 9 mi (14.5 km)	Lucien Theys; Belgium	45:42	Alain Mimoun; France	45:50	Mohamed Hamza; France	46:00
Team
Men	France	43	Belgium	77	England	82

== Individual Race Results ==
=== Men's (9 mi / 14.5 km) ===
Rank	Athlete	Nationality	Time
1st place, gold medalist(s)	Lucien Theys	Belgium	45:42
2nd place, silver medalist(s)	Alain Mimoun	France	45:50
3rd place, bronze medalist(s)	Mohamed Hamza	France	46:00
4	Frank Aaron	England	46:09
5	Marcel Vandewattyne	Belgium	46:10
6	Buenaventura Baldoma	Spain	46:32
7	Alec Olney	England	46:35
8	Roger Petitjean	France	46:38
9	André Nollet	France	46:42
10	Mohamed Brahim	France	46:45
11	Charles Cérou	France	46:50
12	John Doms	Belgium	46:53
13	René Tessier	France	47:07
14	Geoff Saunders	England	47:09
15	Maurits van Laere	Belgium	47:11
16	August Sutter	Switzerland	47:12
17	Len Eyre	England	47:15
18	Reg Gosney	England	47:20
19	Pedro Sierra	Spain	47:23
20	Frans Herman	Belgium	47:34
21	Raphaël Pujazon	France	47:38
22	Harry Hicks	England	47:39
23	Ricardo Yebra	Spain	47:42
24	Emile Renson	Belgium	47:50
25	Doug Thompson	England	47:52
26	Johnny Marshall	Ireland	47:53
27	Willy De Neef	Belgium	47:54
28	Jaime Guixa	Spain	48:02
29	Andy Forbes	Scotland	48:03
30	Jef Lataster	Netherlands	48:04
31	Don Appleby	Ireland	48:09
32	John Diamond	Ireland	48:12
33	Roger Serroels	Belgium	48:13
34	Pierre Page	Switzerland	48:14
35	Hans Frischknecht	Switzerland	48:15
36	Benito Losada Santiago	Spain	48:17
37	Albert Känzig	Switzerland	48:18
38	Charlie Owens	Ireland	48:29
39	Anthony Noonan	Wales	48:39
40	Simon Aldazabal	Spain	48:40
41	Richard Daniels	Belgium	48:41
42	Ted Coggin	England	48:42
43	Gottlieb Stäubli	Switzerland	48:46
44	Charlie Robertson	Scotland	48:55
45	Bobby Reid	Scotland	48:58
46	Frank Sinclair	Scotland	49:07
47	John Green	England	49:09
48	Emmet Farrell	Scotland	49:19
49	Ben Bickerton	Scotland	49:20
50	Antonio Merono	Spain	49:22
51	Karl Gschwend	Switzerland	49:28
52	John Morrow	Ireland	49:34
53	Ernst Sandmeier	Switzerland	49:36
54	Doug Rees	Wales	49:40
55	George Craig	Scotland	49:42
56	Patrick Fahy	Ireland	49:45
57	Rudolf Morgenthaler	Switzerland	49:46
58	Patsy Fitzgerald	Ireland	49:49
59	Tom Moore	Ireland	49:53
60	André Paris	France	49:54
61	Alwin Probst	Switzerland	49:57
62	Dé Slegt	Netherlands	49:58
63	Leonardo Vegas	Spain	50:01
64	Maldwyn White	Wales	50:04
65	J. van Veen	Netherlands	50:10
66	Ivor Lloyd	Wales	50:18
67	Tom Wood	Wales	50:37
68	Jean-Pierre Hoffmann	Luxembourg	50:49
69	Dyfrigg Rees	Wales	50:51
70	Joop Overdijk	Netherlands	50:55
71	Hein Finken	Netherlands	50:56
72	Siem Bobeldijk	Netherlands	51:00
73	Cees de Koning	Netherlands	51:01
74	Pat Wallace	Wales	51:32
75	Tommy Tracey	Scotland	51:33
76	Bruno Mathiussi	Luxembourg	52:04
77	Hans Huizinga	Netherlands	52:14
78	Ken Harris	Wales	52:15
79	Staf Dobbelaere	Netherlands	52:18
80	Roger Ricaille	Luxembourg	53:20
81	Louis Welu	Luxembourg	53:26
82	Venant Kinsch	Luxembourg	54:53
83	Albert Schumacher	Luxembourg	54:53
84	Marcel Barthels	Luxembourg	58:12
85	James Sanderson	Scotland	58:26
—	Kevin Maguire	Ireland	DNF
—	Cliff Rosser	Wales	DNF
—	Charles Heirendt	Luxembourg	DNF

== Team Results ==
=== Men's ===
Rank	Country	Team	Points
1	France	Alain Mimoun; Mohamed Hamza; Roger Petitjean; André Nollet; Mohamed Brahim; Charles Cérou	43
2	Belgium	Lucien Theys; Marcel Vandewattyne; John Doms; Maurits van Laere; Frans Herman; Emile Renson	77
3	England	Frank Aaron; Alec Olney; Geoff Saunders; Len Eyre; Reg Gosney; Harry Hicks	82
4	Spain	Buenaventura Baldoma; Pedro Sierra; Ricardo Yebra; Jaime Guixa; Benito Losada Santiago; Simon Aldazabal	152
5	Switzerland	August Sutter; Pierre Page; Hans Frischknecht; Albert Känzig; Gottlieb Stäubli; Karl Gschwend	216
6	Ireland	Johnny Marshall; Don Appleby; John Diamond; Charlie Owens; John Morrow; Patrick Fahy	235
7	Scotland	Andy Forbes; Charlie Robertson; Bobby Reid; Frank Sinclair; Emmet Farrell; Ben Bickerton	261
8	Wales	Anthony Noonan; Doug Rees; Maldwyn White; Ivor Lloyd; Tom Wood; Dyfrigg Rees	359
9	Netherlands	Jef Lataster; Dé Slegt; J. van Veen; Joop Overdijk; Hein Finken; Siem Bobeldijk	370
10	Luxembourg	Jean-Pierre Hoffmann; Bruno Mathiussi; Roger Ricaille; Louis Welu; Venant Kinsch; Albert Schumacher	470

== Participation ==
An unofficial count yields the participation of 88 athletes from 10 countries.

- Belgium (9)
- England (9)
- France (9)
- Ireland (9)
- Luxembourg (8)
- Netherlands (9)
- Scotland (9)
- Spain (8)
- Switzerland (9)
- Wales (9)
