= 1946 European Athletics Championships – Men's 3000 metres steeplechase =

Men's 3000 metres steeplechase at the European Athletics Championships

The men's 3000 metres steeplechase at the 1946 European Athletics Championships was held in Oslo, Norway, at Bislett Stadium 25 August 1946.

== Medalists ==
Gold	Raphaël Pujazon; France
Silver	Erik Elmsäter; Sweden
Bronze	Tore Sjöstrand; Sweden

== Results ==
=== Final ===
25 August

Rank	Name	Nationality	Time	Notes
1st place, gold medalist(s)	Raphaël Pujazon	France	9:01.4	CR, NR
2nd place, silver medalist(s)	Erik Elmsäter	Sweden	9:11.0	
3rd place, bronze medalist(s)	Tore Sjöstrand	Sweden	9:14.0	
4	Alf Olesen	Denmark	9:18.8	NR
5	Jean Gallet	France	9:19.6	
6	Pentti Siltaloppi	Finland	9:21.0	
7	Jindřich Roudný	Czechoslovakia	9:33.4	NR
8	Marcel Vandewattyne	Belgium	9:37.0	
9	Vasilios Mavrapostolos	Greece	9:41.2	
10	Tadeusz Świniarski	Poland	10:22.8	
	Jan Paulu	Czechoslovakia	DNF	

== Participation ==
According to an unofficial count, 11 athletes from 8 countries participated in the event.

- Belgium (1)
- Czechoslovakia (2)
- Denmark (1)
- Finland (1)
- France (2)
- Greece (1)
- Poland (1)
- Sweden (2)
