= 1948 International Cross Country Championships =

- Organisers: ICCU
- Edition: 35th
- Date: 3 April
- Host city: Reading, Berkshire, England
- Venue: Leighton Park
- Events: 1
- Distances: 9 mi (14.5 km)
- Participation: 54 athletes from 6 nations

The 1948 International Cross Country Championships was held in Reading, England, at the Leighton Park on 3 April 1948. A report on the event was given in the Glasgow Herald.

Complete results, medalists, and the results of British athletes were published.

== Medalists ==
Event	Gold		Silver		Bronze	
Individual
Men; 9 mi (14.5 km)	John Doms; Belgium	54:05	Emile Renson; Belgium	54:25	Mohamed Lahoucine; France	54:50
Team
Men	Belgium	46	France	47	England	114

== Individual Race results ==
=== Men's (9 mi / 14.5 km) ===
Rank	Athlete	Nationality	Time
1st place, gold medalist(s)	John Doms	Belgium	54:05
2nd place, silver medalist(s)	Emile Renson	Belgium	54:25
3rd place, bronze medalist(s)	Mohamed Lahoucine	France	54:50
4	Charles Cérou	France	54:52
5	Frans Wauters	Belgium	55:08
6	Roger Petitjean	France	55:11
7	Jacques Varnoux	France	55:14
8	Ted Downer	England	55:17
9	Jean Chapelle	Belgium	55:21
10	André Nollet	France	55:23
11	Arthur Shorrocks	England	55:28
12	Bobby Reid	Scotland	55:38
13	Marcel Vandewattyne	Belgium	55:48
14	Sydney Wooderson	England	55:50
15	Jerry Kiely	Ireland	55:55
16	Henri Ost	Belgium	55:59
17	Abel Merine	France	56:07
18	Jean De Raedt	Belgium	56:14
19	Ron Hughes	England	56:16
20	Charlie Robertson	Scotland	56:18
21	Brendan Twamley	Ireland	56:27
22	Claude Joly	France	56:28
23	Patsy Fitzgerald	Ireland	56:30
24	René Breistroffer	France	56:32
25	Alec McLean	Scotland	56:39
26	Henri Leveque	France	56:48
27	Robert Conn	Ireland	56:51
28	Patrick Fahy	Ireland	56:55
29	Emmet Farrell	Scotland	57:01
30	Jack Corfield	England	57:08
31	Pat Haughey	Ireland	57:11
32	Jack Carrick	England	57:13
33	John Andrews	Wales	57:14
34	Dick Adams	England	57:15
35	Vic Blowfield	England	57:23
36	Joseph Reamackers	Belgium	57:30
37	Jim Flockhart	Scotland	57:38
38	George Craig	Scotland	57:44
39	Jack Charlesworth	England	58:05
40	Jim Alford	Wales	58:08
41	Kevin Maguire	Ireland	58:10
42	Ivor Lloyd	Wales	58:18
43	G. Carolan	Ireland	58:19
44	Jimmy Todd	Ireland	58:38
45	Robert Schoonjans	Belgium	58:45
46	James Davies	Wales	58:47
47	Eric Williams	Wales	58:53
48	Tom Richards	Wales	59:08
49	William McLean	Scotland	59:34
50	Maldwyn White	Wales	59:39
51	Dennis Morgan	Wales	59:45
52	Frank Bathgate	Scotland	1:00:03
53	Frank Sinclair	Scotland	1:00:14
–	Horace Oliver	Wales	DNF

== Team results ==
=== Men's ===
Rank	Country	Team	Points
1	Belgium	John Doms; Emile Renson; Frans Wauters; Jean Chapelle; Marcel Vandewattyne; Henri Ost	46
2	France	Mohamed Lahoucine; Charles Cérou; Roger Petitjean; Jacques Varnoux; André Nollet; Abel Merine	47
3	England	Ted Downer; Arthur Shorrocks; Sydney Wooderson; Ron Hughes; Jack Corfield; Jack Carrick	114
4	Ireland	Jerry Kiely; Brendan Twamley; Patsy Fitzgerald; Robert Conn; Patrick Fahy; Pat Haughey	145
5	Scotland	Bobby Reid; Charlie Robertson; Alec McLean; Emmet Farrell; Jim Flockhart; George Craig	161
6	Wales	John Andrews; Jim Alford; Ivor Lloyd; James Davies; Eric Williams; Tom Richards	256

== Participation ==
An unofficial count yields the participation of 54 athletes from 6 countries.

- Belgium (9)
- England (9)
- France (9)
- Ireland (9)
- Scotland (9)
- Wales (9)
