= John Doms =

Belgian long-distance runner

Medal record

Men's athletics

Representing Belgium

International Cross Country Championships
Gold medal – first place	1948 Reading	Senior race

John Doms (5 November 1924 in Waarloos – 27 June 2013 in Duffel) was a Belgian long-distance runner who competed in cross country running and the steeplechase. His greatest achievements came at the International Cross Country Championships (the precursor to the world championship). He became Belgium's first ever winner of the event in 1948, leading the Belgian men to the team title as well. He returned four times further, taking 12th in both 1949 and 1950, before sinking out of the top twenty at the two following year's races. He shared in the team silver medal in both 1950 and 1951. His Belgian team contemporaries included Marcel Vandewattyne and Lucien Theys.

He was born in Waarloos, Antwerp Province and died in Duffel. He represented Belgium at the 1948 Summer Olympics in London, running in the steeplechase, though he was eliminated in qualifying. He represented Belgium on the track at one further major competition – he placed ninth in the 10,000 metres at the 1950 European Athletics Championships.

== International competitions ==
Year	Competition	Venue	Position	Event	Notes
1948	International Cross Country Championships	Reading, United Kingdom	1st	Senior race	54:05
1948	International Cross Country Championships	Reading, United Kingdom	1st	Senior team	46 pts
1948	Olympic Games	London, United Kingdom	6th (q)	3000 m s'chase	9:41.8
1949	International Cross Country Championships	Dublin, Ireland	12th	Senior race	49:01
1949	International Cross Country Championships	Dublin, Ireland	5th	Senior team	146 pts
1950	International Cross Country Championships	Brussels, Belgium	12th	Senior race	46:53
1950	International Cross Country Championships	Brussels, Belgium	2nd	Senior team	77 pts
1950	European Championships	Brussels, Belgium	9th	10,000 m	31:04.2
1951	International Cross Country Championships	Caerleon, United Kingdom	21st	Senior race	?
1951	International Cross Country Championships	Caerleon, United Kingdom	2nd	Senior team	99 pts
1952	International Cross Country Championships	Hamilton, United Kingdom	41st	Senior race	?
