= Geoff Saunders =

English cross country runner

Medal record

Men's athletics

Representing England

International Cross Country Championships
Gold medal – first place	1951 Caerleon	Senior race

Geoffrey Boothby Saunders (25 January 1929 – 30 October 2019) was an English cross country runner. He represented England four times at the International Cross Country Championships from 1949 to 1952 and was the winner of the race in 1951, leading England to the team gold. He shared in the minor team medals in his other three outings.

== Biography ==
Saunders grew up around the Lake District, having moved the due to wartime evacuation. He took up cross country running there and attended Repton School. He ran for Derby & County Athletic Club before moving to Bolton at the age of seventeen, as his father began working as a doctor there, and joined Bolton Harriers. He joined the army, rising to lieutenant, and he won army running titles on the track and in cross country. He retired from the sport in 1953 at the age of 24 as his job at a chemists required him to work weekends.

At the International Cross Country Championships he was England's top finisher in fifth in 1949, leading the English men (including Frank Aaron and Len Eyre) to second in the team rankings behind France. He dropped to 14th the following year, with Aaron replacing him as England's leader. The bronze medal-winning team also included Alec Olney and Eyre. Aaron and Olney were in the International champion team of 1951, as was Walter Hesketh – a regional rival of Saunders'. On his last outing in 1952 he ended the race in 13th. The English team were second to the French – Hesketh led the team in fourth and the emerging Frank Sando (himself later an individual champion) was in ninth. The remaining member of the team that year were Frederick Norris and Jim Peters.

Saunders died on 30 October 2019, at the age of 90.

== International competitions ==
Year	Competition	Venue	Position	Event	Notes
1949	International Cross Country Championships	Dublin, Ireland	5th	Senior race	48:14
1949	International Cross Country Championships	Dublin, Ireland	2nd	Senior team	90 pts
1950	International Cross Country Championships	Brussels, Belgium	14th	Senior race	47:09
1950	International Cross Country Championships	Brussels, Belgium	3rd	Senior team	82 pts
1951	International Cross Country Championships	Caerleon, Wales	1st	Senior race	54:07
1951	International Cross Country Championships	Caerleon, Wales	1st	Senior team	47 pts
1952	International Cross Country Championships	Hamilton, United Kingdom	13th	Senior race	50:11
1952	International Cross Country Championships	Hamilton, United Kingdom	2nd	Senior team	64 pts
