= 1952 International Cross Country Championships =

- Organisers: ICCU
- Edition: 39th
- Date: 22 March
- Host city: Hamilton, Scotland
- Venue: Hamilton Park
- Events: 1
- Distances: 9 mi (14.5 km)
- Participation: 63 athletes from 7 nations

The 1952 International Cross Country Championships was held in Hamilton, Scotland, at the Hamilton Park on 22 March 1952. A report on the event was given in the Glasgow Herald.

Complete results, medalists, and the results of British athletes were published.

== Medalists ==
Event	Gold		Silver		Bronze	
Individual
Men; 9 mi (14.5 km)	Alain Mimoun; France	48:19	Marcel Vandewattyne; Belgium	49:02	Abdelkader Driss; France	49:06
Team
Men	France	35	England	64	Belgium	126

== Individual Race Results ==
=== Men's (9 mi / 14.5 km) ===
Rank	Athlete	Nationality	Time
1st place, gold medalist(s)	Alain Mimoun	France	48:19
2nd place, silver medalist(s)	Marcel Vandewattyne	Belgium	49:02
3rd place, bronze medalist(s)	Abdelkader Driss	France	49:06
4	Walter Hesketh	England	49:19
5	Buenaventura Baldoma	Spain	49:27
6	Julien Soucours	France	49:35
7	Mohamed Hamza	France	49:44
8	Abdallah Ould Lamine	France	49:51
9	Frank Sando	England	49:53
10	Ali Ou Bassou	France	49:54
11	Frank Aaron	England	50:02
12	Fred Norris	England	50:08
13	Geoff Saunders	England	50:11
14	Eddie Bannon	Scotland	50:18
15	Jim Peters	England	50:25
16	Ray Hatton	England	
17	Maurits van Laere	Belgium	50:35
18	Roger Petitjean	France	50:35
19	Antonio Amoros	Spain	50:38
20	André Deschacht	Belgium	50:39
21	André Valdovinos	France	
22	Ahmed Abdelkrim	France	
23	Tommy Tracey	Scotland	
24	Roger Serroels	Belgium	
25	Andy Forbes	Scotland	
26	Bobby Reid	Scotland	
27	Dick Adams	England	
28	Patsy Fitzgerald	Ireland	
29	David Nelson	Scotland	
30	Jean Simonet	Belgium	
31	Pedro Sierra	Spain	
32	Francisco Irizar	Spain	
33	Jules Limbourg	Belgium	
34	Charlie Robertson	Scotland	
35	Charlie Owens	Ireland	
36	Johnny Marshall	Ireland	
37	Paul Huylebroeck	Belgium	
38	Jaime Guixa	Spain	
39	Edward Hardy	England	
40	Jose Coll	Spain	
41	John Doms	Belgium	
42	Tom Wood	Wales	
43	Joseph Deriemaeker	Belgium	
44	Antonio Karamany	Spain	
45	Tom Stevenson	Scotland	
46	Gregorio Rojo	Spain	
47	Don Appleby	Ireland	
48	J. McClelland	Ireland	
49	W.A. Robertson	Ireland	
50	Doug Rees	Wales	
51	Dyfrigg Rees	Wales	
52	Archie Gibson	Scotland	
53	George Phipps	Wales	
54	Maldwyn White	Wales	
55	Eddie Wilson	Ireland	
56	Alan Anderson	Ireland	
57	John Edwards	Wales	
58	William Butcher	Wales	
59	Brendan Twamley	Ireland	
60	José Quesada	Spain	
61	Norman Wilson	Wales	
62	Ian Binnie	Scotland	
63	Anthony Noonan	Wales	

== Team Results ==
=== Men's ===
Rank	Country	Team	Points
1	France	Alain Mimoun; Abdelkader Driss; Julien Soucours; Mohamed Hamza; Abdallah Ould Lamine; Ali Ou Bassou	35
2	England	Walter Hesketh; Frank Sando; Frank Aaron; Fred Norris; Geoff Saunders; Jim Peters	64
3	Belgium	Marcel Vandewattyne; Maurits van Laere; André Deschacht; Roger Serroels; Jean Simonet; Jules Limbourg	126
4	Scotland	Eddie Bannon; Tommy Tracey; Andy Forbes; Bobby Reid; David Nelson; Charlie Robertson	151
5	Spain	Buenaventura Baldoma; Antonio Amoros; Pedro Sierra; Francisco Irizar; Jaime Guixa; Jose Coll	165
6	Ireland	Patsy Fitzgerald; Charlie Owens; Johnny Marshall; Don Appleby; J. McClelland; W.A. Robertson	243
7	Wales	Tom Wood; Doug Rees; Dyfrigg Rees; George Phipps; Maldwyn White; John Edwards	307

== Participation ==
An unofficial count yields the participation of 63 athletes from 7 countries.

- Belgium (9)
- England (9)
- France (9)
- Ireland (9)
- Scotland (9)
- Spain (9)
- Wales (9)
