= Göte Hagström =

Swedish long-distance runner (1918–2014)

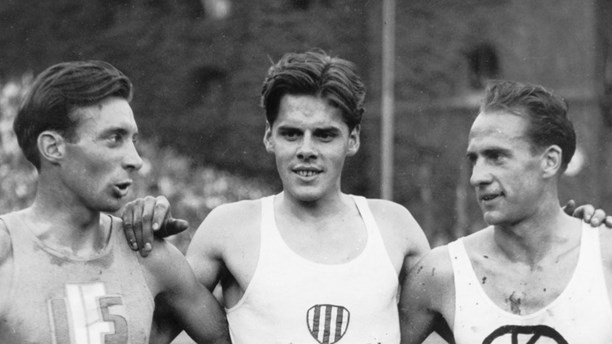
- Erik Elmsäter, Tore Sjöstrand and Göte Hagström at the 1948 Olympics

Personal information
- Born: 7 September 1918 Gagnef, Sweden
- Died: 5 October 2014 (aged 96) Kvarnsveden, Sweden

Sport
- Sport: Athletics
- Event(s): Steeplechase, 5000 m, 10000 m
- Club: Kvarnsvedens GIF, Borlänge

Achievements and titles
- Personal best(s): 3000 mS – 9:01.0 (1948); 5000 m – 14:36.8 (1942); 10000 m – 31:32.2 (1943)
Medal record
Representing Sweden
Olympic Games
Bronze medal – third place	1948 London	3000 m steeplechase

Ernst Göte Hagström (7 September 1918 – 5 October 2014) was a Swedish long-distance runner. He competed at the 1948 Summer Olympics in the 3000 metre steeplechase and won the bronze medal behind teammates Tore Sjöstrand and Erik Elmsäter.

Hagström started as a middle-distance runner, but later focused on the steeplechase, in which he was ranked second in the world in 1948 and third in 1944 and 1945. In 1949 he won his only national title, in cross-country running. Hagström was a turner by profession and also competed in cross-country skiing.
