= Tonnie Dirks =

Dutch former long distance runner

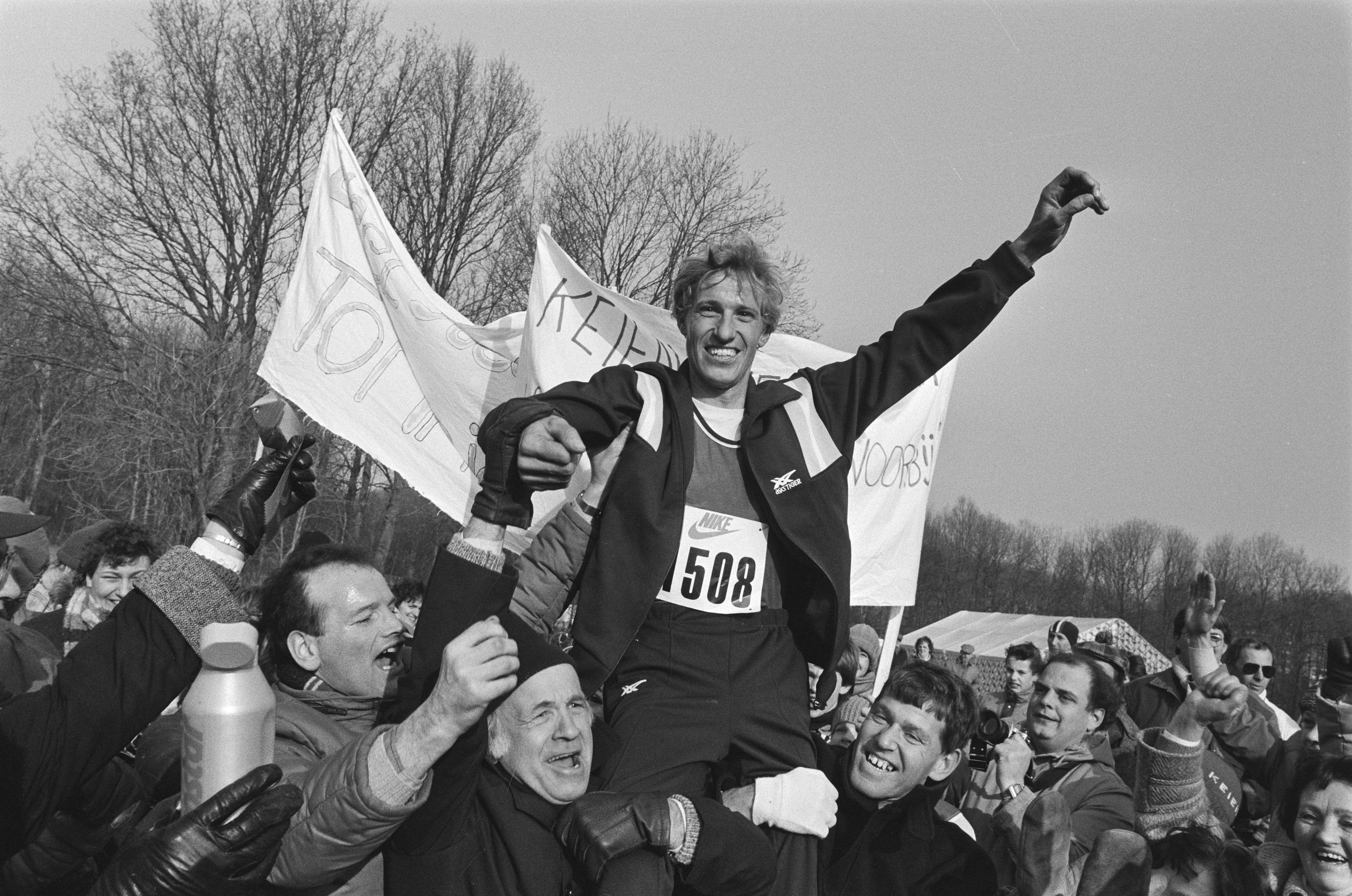
Tonnie Dirks

Antonius Marinus Hendricus Maria "Tonnie" Dirks (born 12 February 1961 in Zeeland, North Brabant) is a Dutch former long-distance runner. He competed internationally on the track, road, and also in cross country competitions.

He ran in the Marathon at the 1991 World Championships in Tokyo, finishing in 16th place with a time of 2:22:17. That year he also competed in the IAAF World Cross Country Championships, but he only managed to finish in 29th position. The following year he competed at the 1992 Summer Olympics, but he did not finish in the Olympic Marathon race. At the Amsterdam Marathon in 1993, he took second behind Kenichi Suzuki with a time of 2:12:27.

He was highly successful at the Warandeloop cross country race: he won in 1984, 1985, 1988, 1990, and 1993, making him the runner with the most titles ever won at the competition. He was also a seven-time national cross country champion; only Kamiel Maase and pre-war competitor Jan Zeegers have more wins than Dirks. He won the Eurocross meeting in neighbouring Luxembourg in 1991.

Further success came in road running competitions in the Netherlands: he won the Zevenheuvelenloop 15-kilometre race three times consecutively from 1989–1991, setting a course record which was beaten by Haile Gebrselassie after five years. He won the Egmond Half Marathon in 1991, and was twice victorious at the Parelloop race (in 1991 and 1993). He was also the 1992 champion of the Bredase Singelloop. At the Paderborner Osterlauf Half Marathon in Germany, Dirks took first place 1989 and again 1991.

Dirks retired from competitive athletics in 1995 and began training athletes, including Luc Krotwaar, Miranda Boonstra.

== National championship wins ==
Event	Year
5000 m	1987
10,000 m	1985, 1988, 1991, 1993
Half marathon	1992
25 km	1989, 1991
Cross country	1986, 1987, 1988, 1990, 1991, 1992, 1994

Sporting positions
Preceded by Robin Bergstrand	Zevenheuvelenloop winner 1989–1991	Succeeded by Carl Thackery
