= Geoffrey Tudor =

British middle-distance runner

Personal information
- Nationality: British (English)
- Born: 29 December 1923 Marhee, India
- Died: 2 October 2018 (aged 94) Bradiford, Devon, England

Sport
- Sport: Athletics
- Event: steeplechase
- Club: University of Oxford AC; Achilles Club

Geoffrey David Claud Tudor (29 December 1923 – 2 October 2018) was a British middle-distance runner who competed at the 1948 Summer Olympics.

== Biography ==
Born in 1923 he was the son of Claud Tudor, he was educated at Wellington School and Christ Church College, Oxford. Tudor was a lightweight boxer before taking up athletics and won the 1946 Oxbridge Sports half-mile title.

Tudor finished second behind Peter Curry in the 2 miles steeplechase event at the 1948 AAA Championships. Shortly after the AAAs, Tudor represented the Great Britain team at the 1948 Olympic Games in London. He competed in the men's 3000 metres steeplechase event and was eliminated in heat two.

Tudor later taught English and Mathematics at Abingdon School from 1948 to 1949 before moving to Devon to teach at the University College of the South West of England.

He died on 2 October 2018 at the age of 94 in Bradiford, Devon.
