= Rene Howell =

British middle-distance runner

Personal information
- Nationality: British (English)
- Born: 19 December 1916 West Ham, London, England
- Died: 1989 (aged 72–73)

Sport
- Sport: Middle-distance running
- Event: Steeplechase
- Club: Polytechnic Harriers

Rene William Howell (19 December 1916 – 1989) was a British middle-distance runner who competed at the 1948 Summer Olympics.

== Biography ==
Howell, a civil service clerical officer by trade, served with the Queen's Royal Regiment during World War I. After the war he joined the Polytechnic Harriers, following spells with the Victoria Park Harriers and Tower Hamlets Athletics Club and the Finchley Harriers.

Howell secured the Essex County Championships, Southern Counties steeplechase title and Inter-County Championships before going into the 1948 season. Howell finished third behind Peter Curry in the 2 miles steeplechase event at the 1948 AAA Championships. Shortly after the AAAs, Howell represented the Great Britain team at the 1948 Olympic Games in London, where he competed in the men's 3000 metres steeplechase event, finishing 7th in heat three.

Howell would later finish third behind Petar Šegedin at the 1951 AAA Championships.
