= Paavo Toivari =

Finnish middle-distance runner

Personal information
- Full name: Paavo Veikko Toivari
- Nationality: Finnish
- Born: 11 January 1917
- Died: 11 February 2010 (aged 93)

Sport
- Sport: Middle-distance running
- Event: Steeplechase

Paavo Veikko Toivari (11 January 1917 – 11 February 2010) was a Finnish middle-distance runner. He competed in the men's 3000 metres steeplechase at the 1948 Summer Olympics.
