= Ray Hatton =

English educator, author and long-distance runner (1932–2015)

- Born: February 4, 1932; Lichfield, England
- Died: March 4, 2015 (aged 83); Eugene, Oregon, United States
- Education: University of Idaho (BS, M.Ed.); University of Oregon (MA, PhD)
- Occupation: College professor
- Spouse: Sylvia Hatton
- Children: R. Peter Hatton and Janice E. Hatton
- Writing career
- Notable works: High Desert of Central Oregon; Bend in Central Oregon; The Oregon Weather Book: A State of Extremes
- Notable awards: USATF Masters Hall of Fame; USATF Masters Runners of the Year (45–49 Age Division), 1981; USATF Masters Runners of the Year (50–54 Age Division), 1982

Raymond Robert (Ray) Hatton (February 4, 1932 – March 4, 2015) was an English educator, author, and long-distance runner. Born in England, Hatton moved to the United States in 1956 to attend college, earning degrees in education and geography from University of Idaho and the University of Oregon. He was an award-winning college geography professor for many years. Hatton wrote ten books on Oregon geography, history, and climatology. In the 1970s and 1980s, he won numerous Masters level running championships and set American records in several long-distance running events. Ran a Masters WR in the Mile at 4:26.0 in 1972. Hatton was inducted into the USATF Masters Hall of Fame in 2001.

== Early life ==
Hatton was born on February 4, 1932, in Lichfield, England. He began competitive running in 1943. Running with the Birchfield Harriers, he ran a 4:11 mile and 8:57 two-mile. In 1952, he represented England in the International Cross Country Championships in Glasgow, Scotland, where he finished 16th overall behind future Olympic Gold medalist Alain Mimoun. His English team took the silver medal behind Mimoun's French team.

Hatton was awarded a track scholarship to University of Idaho in 1956. He graduated from the university in 1960 with a Bachelor of Science degree in education. He then went on to acquire a Master of Education degree in secondary education from the university, completing his post-graduate work in 1966.

== Educator ==
In 1969, Hatton earned a Master of Arts in geography from University of Oregon. His master's thesis was on the impact of tourism on Central Oregon. Later that year, he joined the faculty at Central Oregon Community College. As a member of the faculty, his academic interests included economics, cultural geography, land use, and climatology. In 1973, he published his first book, a study of the weather and climate of Central Oregon. The college gave him a sabbatical during the 1975–1976 academic year to research and write his second book. He dedicated that book, High Desert Of Central Oregon, to Phil Brogan, a well-known Central Oregon journalist and historian.

He received a doctorate degree in geography from the University of Oregon in 1989. In 1990, Hatton received Central Oregon Community College's Faculty Achievement Award. During his tenure at Central Oregon Community College, he published six books on Oregon geography, history, and climatology. He retired from Central Oregon Community College in 1993. As a professor emeritus, he continued to research and write about Oregon. Since retiring from his college faculty position, Hatton has published four more books.

== Books ==
Over the years, Hatton's research, including numerous first-person field interviews, has played an important role in preserving Central Oregon's pioneer history. This work was the basis for ten books. Central Oregon's geography, history, and climate are the subject of the first eight books. The last two books are on the weather and climate of the state of Oregon and the Portland, Oregon, area. Here is a list of his books:

- Bend Country Weather and Climate, Binford and Mort, 1973; revised in 1977
- High Desert of Central Oregon, Binford and Mort, 1977; second edition in 1981
- Bend in Central Oregon, Binford and Mort, 1978
- High Country of Central Oregon, Binford and Mort, 1980
- Pioneer Homesteaders of the Fort Rock Valley, Binford and Mort, 1982
- Oregon's Big Country: A Portrait of Southeastern Oregon, Maverick Publications, 1988
- Sisters Country Weather and Climate, Maverick Publications, 1994
- Oregon's Sisters Country (co-written with Lawrence A. Chitwood and Stuart G. Garrett), Geographical Books, 1996
- The Oregon Weather Book: A State of Extremes (co-written with George Taylor and George H. Taylor), Oregon State University Press, 1999
- Portland, Oregon Weather and Climate: A Historical Perspective, Geographical Books, 2005

In 1984, the Oregon Historical Society published a review of Pioneer Homesteaders of the Fort Rock Valley in the Oregon Historical Quarterly, the society's premier history journal. The same journal published a review of Oregon’s Sisters Country in 1998.

== Distance runner ==
Ray Hatton
Sport
- Sport: Distance running

Achievements and titles
- World finals: Cross country, 1952: 16th
- Personal bests: Mile run: 4:11; Two-mile: 8:57
Medal record
Representing England
Men's athletics
International Cross Country Championships
Silver medal – second place	1952 GlasgowTeam	{{{2}}}
Representing United States
AAU Masters Championships
Gold medal – first place	1972 (40–44 age division)	1,500m
Gold medal – first place	1972 (40–44 age division)	5,000m
Gold medal – first place	1972 (40–44 age division)	10,000m
Gold medal – first place	1974 (40–44 age division)	5,000m
Gold medal – first place	1974 (40–44 age division)	10,000m
Gold medal – first place	1976 (40–44 age division)	10,000m
Gold medal – first place	1979 (45–49 age division)	5,000m
Silver medal – second place	1979 (45–49 age division)	10,000m
USATF Masters Championships
Gold medal – first place	1984 (50–54 age division)	10,000m
Silver medal – second place	1987 (55–59 age division)	1,500m
Gold medal – first place	1987 (55–59 age division)	5,000m

Hatton attended the University of Idaho on a track scholarship from 1956 until 1960. As an undergraduate, he competed in both track and cross-country at the varsity level. In 1959, he won the Pacific Coast Conference cross country championship. After college, Hatton continued to compete in elite running events. During the 1970s and 1980s, he won national championship races and set a number American long-distance running records in Masters level competitions.

At the Amateur Athletic Union’s national masters championship in 1972, Hatton won the 1,500 meters (4:11.5), 5,000 meters (15:36.3), and 10,000 meters (31:42.8) in the 40–44 age division. In 1974, he won both 5,000 meters and the 10,000 meters events at the Amateur Athletic Union's national masters championship. Hatton again won the 40–44 age division national championship in 10,000 meters in 1976. In 1979, he competed in the 45–49 age division, winning the 5,000 meters and placing second in the 10,000 meters.

In 1981, Hatton was named Masters 45–49 Age Division Runners of the Year by USA Track and Field (the governing body for track and field in the United States). The next year, Hatton was recognized with the same award in the 50–54 age category. In 1984, he won the national masters title in the 10,000 meters, running in the 50–54 age division. He competed in the 55–59 age division in 1987, winning the 5,000 meters and placing second in the 1,500 meters. In 1988, Hatton was the top ranked 55–59 age division runner in the United States in both the 3,000 meters and the 5,000 meters. That year, he posted a time of 9:37.8 in the 3,000 meters along with a 16:35.5 in the 5,000 meters. The next year, he continued as the top ranked runner in the 3,000 meters, clocking a time of 9:34.0. After back surgery in 1992, Hatton retired from competitive running.

Over the years, Hatton set a number of national running records. He set American records in the 40–44 age category in the 1 mile (4:24.0), for the 2 mile (9:17.6), and the 10,000 meters (30:56.0). Hatton was inducted into the USA Track and Field Masters Hall of Fame in 2001. As of 2013, four of his American records still stand:

- American 1,500 meters record (Masters 50–54 age division) – 4:05.8 (set 8 July 1982)
- American 3,000 meters record (Masters 50–54 age division) – 8:53.8 (set 25 June 1982)
- American 10,000 meters road race record (Masters 50–54 age division) – 31:48 (set 23 May 1982)
- American 10,000 meters record (Masters 50–54 age division) – 32:10.4 (set 18 June 1983)

== Personal life ==
For most of his adult life, Hatton lived with his wife Sylvia in Bend, Oregon. Together, they had two children, R. Peter Hatton and Janice E. Hatton. Over the years, Hatton served on Bend's Planning Commission and the city's Urban Advisory Commission. In addition to long-distance running, his recreational interests included hiking, cross-country skiing, and rock climbing. In 2010, at the age of 77, Hatton was still running 30 miles (48 km) per week. He died in Eugene, Oregon, on March 4, 2015.
