= Adriënne Herzog =

Dutch runner (born 1985)

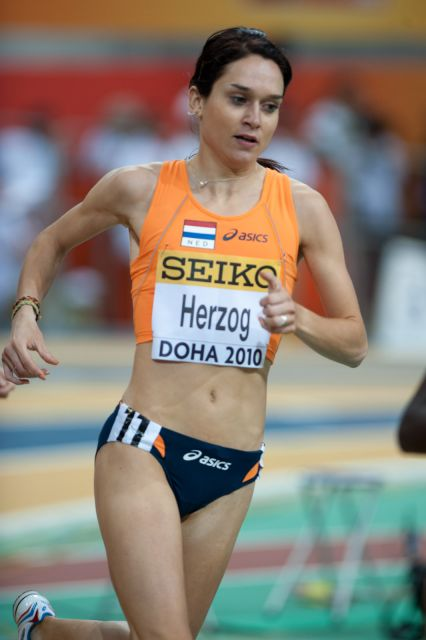
Herzog competing at the 2010 IAAF World Indoor Championships

Adriënne Herzog (born 30 September 1985, Amersfoort) is a Dutch middle- and long-distance runner. She has had most of her success in cross country running, being twice a bronze medallist at the European Cross Country Championships (2009 and 2012). She represented the Netherlands on the track at the 2006 European Athletics Championships and 2009 World Championships in Athletics, but failed to make the final on either occasion. She was a finalist, however, at the 2010 IAAF World Indoor Championships.

She is a seven-time Dutch national champion in cross country. She also won a bronze medal at the 2003 European Athletics Junior Championships. On the circuit, she won the 2009 Lotto Cross Cup Brussels.

Herzog was implicated in doping practices as part of investigations connected with Operación Galgo. Her coach at the time, Manuel Pascua Piqueras, was a central figure in the scandal. After being interrogated by the police, she was ultimately not charged of an offence after the evidence against her was destroyed. In 2013, Dutch magazine Vrij Nederland published a series of email excerpts which it claimed demonstrated Herzog obtaining performance-enhancing drugs during 2011 and 2012. Following this, her new coach Brad Hudson decided to cease working with Herzog, despite her claims that the magazine's assertions were untrue and no formal proceedings were brought against her. Herzog received a two-year doping ban after she gave a positive test in March 2014. She claimed that the positive test was a mistake and that she had never used banned substances.

== National titles ==
- Dutch Athletics Championships
  - 1500 m: 2005, 2006, 2009
- Dutch Cross Country Championships
  - Short course: 2004
  - Long course: 2005, 2006, 2007, 2008, 2011, 2012

== International competitions ==
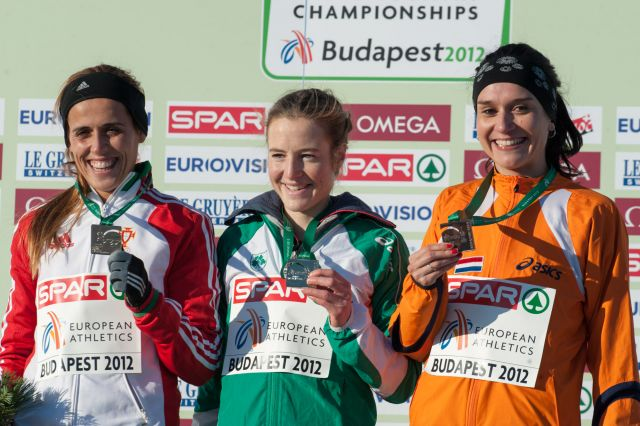
Herzog (right) won the podium at the 2012 European Cross Country Championships

Year	Competition	Venue	Position	Event	Notes
2002	IAAF World Cross Country Championships	Dublin, Ireland	30th	Junior race	22:00
2002	World Junior Championships	Kingston, Jamaica	10th	3000 m	9:31.15
2002	World Junior Championships	Kingston, Jamaica	13th	5000 m	16:46.53
2002	European Cross Country Championships	Medulin, Croatia	5th	Junior race	12:30
2002	European Cross Country Championships	Medulin, Croatia	4th	Junior team	109 pts
2003	World Cross Country Championships	Lausanne, Switzerland	—	Junior race	DNF
2003	European Junior Championships	Tampere, Finland	3rd	3000 m	9:26.01
2004	World Junior Championships	Grosseto, Italy	7th	3000 m	9:32.33
2004	European Cross Country Championships	Seebad Heringsdorf, Germany	4th	Junior race	16:06
2005	European U23 Championships	Erfurt, Germany	7th	5000 m	16:26.84
2005	European Cross Country Championships	Tilburg, Netherlands	15th	Senior race	
2006	European Championships	Stockholm, Sweden	17th (heats)	1500 m	4:11.16
2006	European Cross Country Championships	San Giorgio, Italy	7th	Under-23 race	19:20
2006	European Cross Country Championships	San Giorgio, Italy	4th	Under-23 team	97 pts
2007	European Cross Country Championships	Toro, Spain	2nd	Under-23 race	22:37
2008	European Cross Country Championships	Brussels, Belgium	6th	Senior race	28:19
2008	European Cross Country Championships	Brussels, Belgium	4th	Senior team	97 pts
2009	World Championships	Berlin, Germany	27th (heats)	1500 m	4:10.10
2009	European Cross Country Championships	Dublin, Ireland	3rd	Senior race	28:04
2010	World Indoor Championships	Doha, Qatar	12th	3000 m	9:12.99
2011	European Cross Country Championships	Velenje, Slovenia	5th	Senior race	26:34
2012	European Cross Country Championships	Szentendre, Hungary	3rd	Senior race	27:48

== See also ==
- List of doping cases in athletics
