= Claud Tudor =

English cricketer and British Army officer

Colonel Claud Lechmere St John Tudor OBE MC (27 December 1888 – 3 August 1977) was a British Army officer and English cricketer active from 1910 to 1927, who played for Sussex. He was born in Willingdon, Sussex and died in Oxford. Tudor appeared in 19 first-class matches as a right-handed batsman, scoring 640 runs with a highest score of 116.

Tudor served with the Royal Army Service Corps. For his services in the First World War, he was awarded the Military Cross, and the Serbian Order of the White Eagle (4th class), and was invested as an Officer of the Order of the British Empire.

His son was Geoffrey Tudor.
