= Gregorio Rojo =

Spanish long-distance runner

Gregorio Rojo Sagredo (3 May 1920, Burgos – 8 May 2006, Barcelona) was a Spanish distance runner.

He participated in the 1948 Summer Olympics in London, where he participated in the 5000 meter and 10,000 meter races. He was the six-time winner of the Jean Bouin Memorial race, the most wins of any male runner in the race's 106-year history. He participated in the International Cross Country Championships in 1949 and 1952.

After retiring from running in 1957, he began coaching. He was named Royal Spanish Athletics Federation's coach of the year in 1995 and 1998. He retired in 2001.
