= Guus Zeegers =

Dutch middle-distance runner

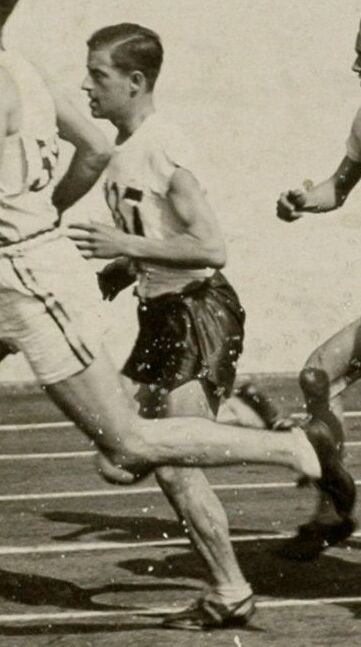
- Guus Zeegers in 1928

Personal information
- Nationality: Dutch
- Born: 25 January 1906 Amsterdam, Netherlands
- Died: 26 February 1978 (aged 72) Amsterdam, Netherlands

Sport
- Sport: Middle-distance running
- Event: 800 metres

Guus Zeegers (25 January 1906 – 26 February 1978) was a Dutch middle-distance runner. He competed in the men's 800 metres at the 1928 Summer Olympics. He was a younger brother of middle-distance runner Jan Zeegers.
