= Aarne Kainlauri =

Finnish steeplechaser (1915–2020)

Aarne Kainlauri (25 May 1915 – 11 March 2020) was a Finnish steeplechaser who competed in the 1948 Summer Olympics, finishing 10th. Through World War II, he was frequently on the podium in the Finnish national Championships, winning the 800 metres in 1940 and 1943. He won both the 1500 metres and steeplechase in 1948, but was selected to the Olympics only in the steeplechase. He repeated his steeplechase victory in 1949 before retiring to work for the Finnish National Railroad. He remained an active cyclist into his 90s. He turned 100 in May 2015. He died on 11 March 2020, aged 104.

== See also ==
- List of centenarians (sportspeople)
