= 1950 AAA Championships =

Outdoor track and field competition

- Dates: 14–15 July 1950
- Host city: London, England
- Venue: White City Stadium
- Level: Senior
- Type: Outdoor

The 1950 AAA Championships was the 1950 edition of the annual outdoor track and field competition organised by the Amateur Athletic Association (AAA). It was held from 14 to 15 July 1950 at White City Stadium in London, England.

== Summary ==
The Championships covered two days of competition. The marathon was held in Reading and the decathlon event was held in Southampton.

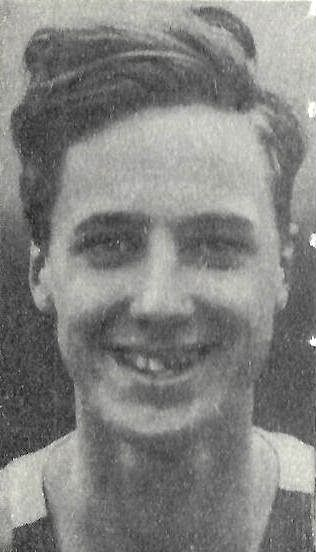
Alan Paterson retained his high jump title

== Results ==
| Event | Gold | | Silver | | Bronze | |
|---|---|---|---|---|---|---|
| 100 yards | McDonald Bailey | 9.9 | John Wilkinson | 10.2 | Ian Grieve | 10.3 |
| 220 yards | McDonald Bailey | 21.8 | John Wilkinson | 22.0 | Nick Stacey | 22.2 |
| 440 yards | Leslie Lewis | 48.2 | Derek Pugh | 48.5 | (Republic of Ireland) Paul Dolan | 49.1 |
| 880 yards | Arthur Wint | 1:51.6 | Roger Bannister | 1:52.1 | John Parlett | 1:53.1 |
| 1 mile | Bill Nankeville | 4:12.2 | Len Eyre | 4:13.2 | Alan Parker | 4:14.0 |
| 3 miles | (Belgium) Lucien Theys | 14:09.0 | Alec Olney | 14:11.2 | Andrew Ferguson | 14:11.6 |
| 6 miles | Frank Aaron | 29:33.6 NR | (Belgium) Marcel Vandewattyne | 29:40.6 | (Socialist Federal Republic of Yugoslavia) Franjo Mihalić | 30:12.0 |
| marathon | Jack Holden | 2:31:03.4 | Edward Denison | 2:37:00.0 | (Scotland) Harry Howard | 2:37:15.0 |
| steeplechase | (Socialist Federal Republic of Yugoslavia) Petar Šegedin | 10:02.4 | (Wales) John Disley | 10:05.4 NR | (Belgium) Robert Schoonjans | 10:20.8 |
| 120y hurdles | Peter Hildreth | 15.2 | Ray Barkway | 15.3 | (Belgium) Pol Braekman | 15.3 |
| 440y hurdles | Harry Whittle | 55.2 | Angus Scott | 55.2 | John Davis | 56.8 |
| 7 miles walk | Roland Hardy | 50:11.6 NR | Lol Allen | 50:22.6 | (Sweden) Axel Thuresson | 53:42.2 |
| high jump | (Scotland) Alan Paterson | 1.930 | Ron Pavitt | 1.905 | Charles Van Dyck | 1.854 |
| pole vault | (Denmark) Rudy Stjernild | 3.96 | Tim Anderson & (Scotland) Norman Gregor | | | both 3.81 |
| long jump | Harry Askew | 7.07 | Roy Cruttenden | 7.05 | (United States) Meredith Gourdine | 7.00 |
| triple jump | Sidney Cross | 14.26 | File:Flag of the Gold Coast (1877–1957).svg William Laing | 14.13 | David Field | 14.01 |
| shot put | (Socialist Federal Republic of Yugoslavia) Petar Sarcevic | 15.23 | John Savidge | 14.79 | John Giles | 14.18 |
| discus throw | (Belgium) Raymond Kintziger | 46.77 | (Scotland) Harry Duguid | 45.00 | Andrew Jansons | 43.92 |
| hammer throw | (Scotland) Duncan Clark | 54.36 | (Socialist Federal Republic of Yugoslavia) Ivan Gubijan | 52.86 | (Scotland) Ewan Douglas | 52.37 |
| javelin throw | Michael Denley | 58.53 | Malcolm Dalrymple | 57.16 | (Scotland) Gordon Fisher | 55.24 |
| decathlon | Harry Whittle | 6087 NR | Geoff Elliott | 6005 | (Norway) Hans Sigg | 5933 |

== See also ==
- 1950 WAAA Championships
