= Zevenheuvelenloop =

Annual 15 kilometres road running race held in Nijmegen, Netherlands

- Location: Nijmegen, Netherlands
- Event type: Road running
- Distance: 15 km
- Primary sponsor: NN
- Established: 1984
- Course records: Men: 40:42 (2024) WR (Uganda) Jacob Kiplimo; Women: 44:20 (2019) WR (Ethiopia) Letesenbet Gidey
- Website: Zevenheuvelenloop
- Participants: 6,088 (2019); 6,138 (2018)

The Zevenheuvelenloop (Dutch pronunciation: [ˌzeːvə(n)ˈɦøːvələ(n)loːp]; English: Seven Hills Run) is an annual road race of 15 kilometres held in and around Nijmegen, Netherlands. It was first organised in 1984 and has grown to be one of the largest road races in the Netherlands; it attracted over 30,000 runners in 2008.

The current men's course record is 40:42 (min:s) by Jacob Kiplimo from 2024 and the current women's course record is 44:20 by Letesenbet Gidey from 2019, both of which are also world best performances.

== History ==
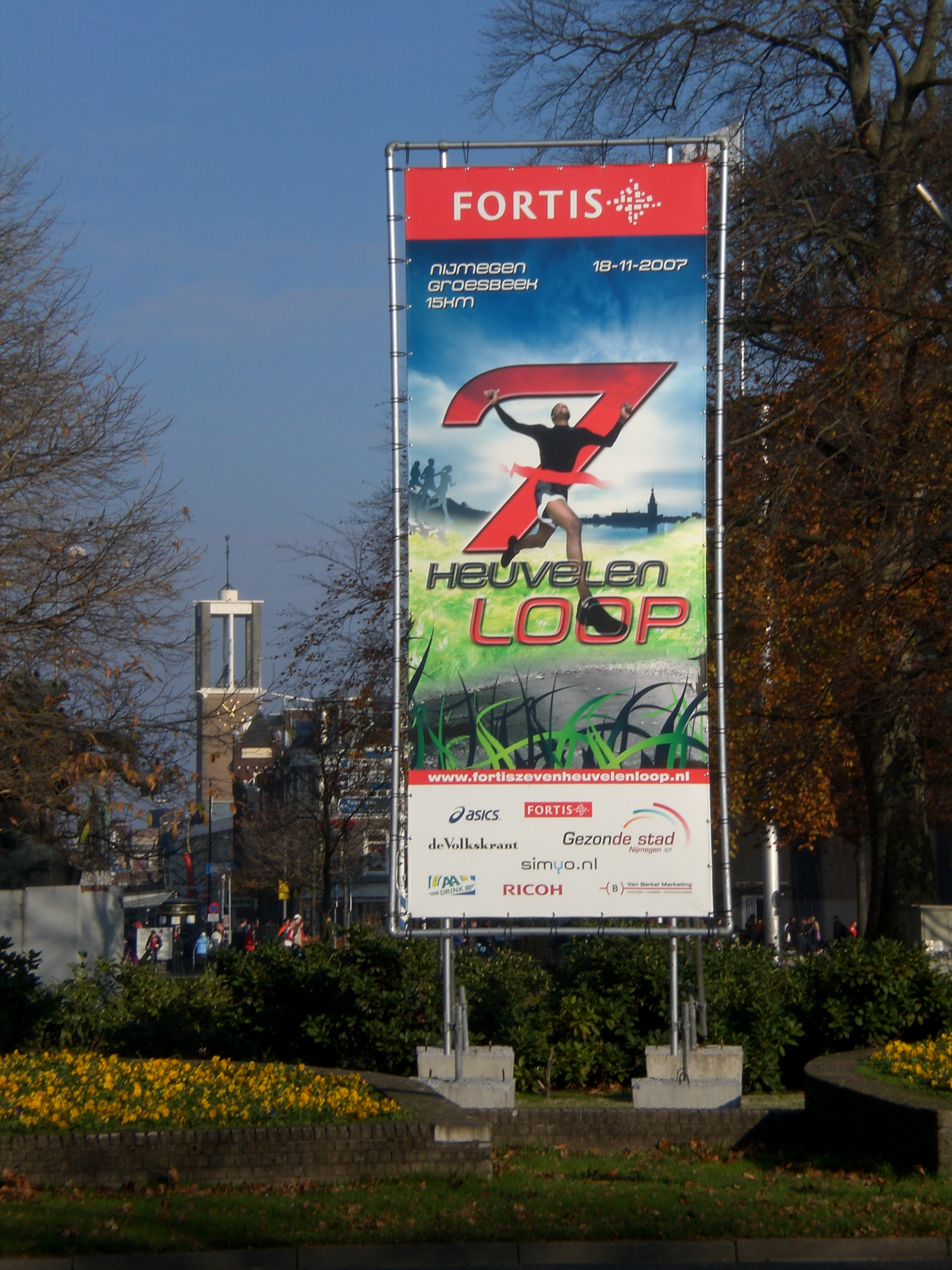
An advertisement for the 2007 race

The inaugural edition of the race in 1984 featured only an 11.9 kilometre course as the Dutch athletics federation (Koninklijke Nederlandse Atletiek Unie) would not allow new races to be longer than 12 km. The current undulating, hilly course begins in Nijmegen, follows a path to Groesbeek and then loops back towards Nijmegen to the finish line. Zevenheuvelenloop lends itself to fast times: Felix Limo broke the men's world record in 2001 and, at the 2009 edition, Tirunesh Dibaba broke the women's world record over 15 km. In 2010, Leonard Komon improved Limo's World Record by running 41:13. In 2018, Joshua Cheptegei won the Zevenheuvelenloop in 41:05, setting the current World Record for 15 km. In 2019, Letesenbet Gidey won the Zevenheuvelenloop in 44:20, setting the current World Record for 15 km.

A number of athletes have achieved victory at the Zevenheuvelenloop on multiple occasions; Tonnie Dirks, Tegla Loroupe, Mestawet Tufa, Sileshi Sihine and Haile Gebrselassie have each won the race three times, and Joshua Cheptegei has won the race four times. The 2002 winner, South African Irvette Van Blerk won the race at the age of fifteen, having entered the race while holidaying in the Netherlands. The race was used as the test event for the development of the ChampionChip personal RFID timing system.

== Winners ==
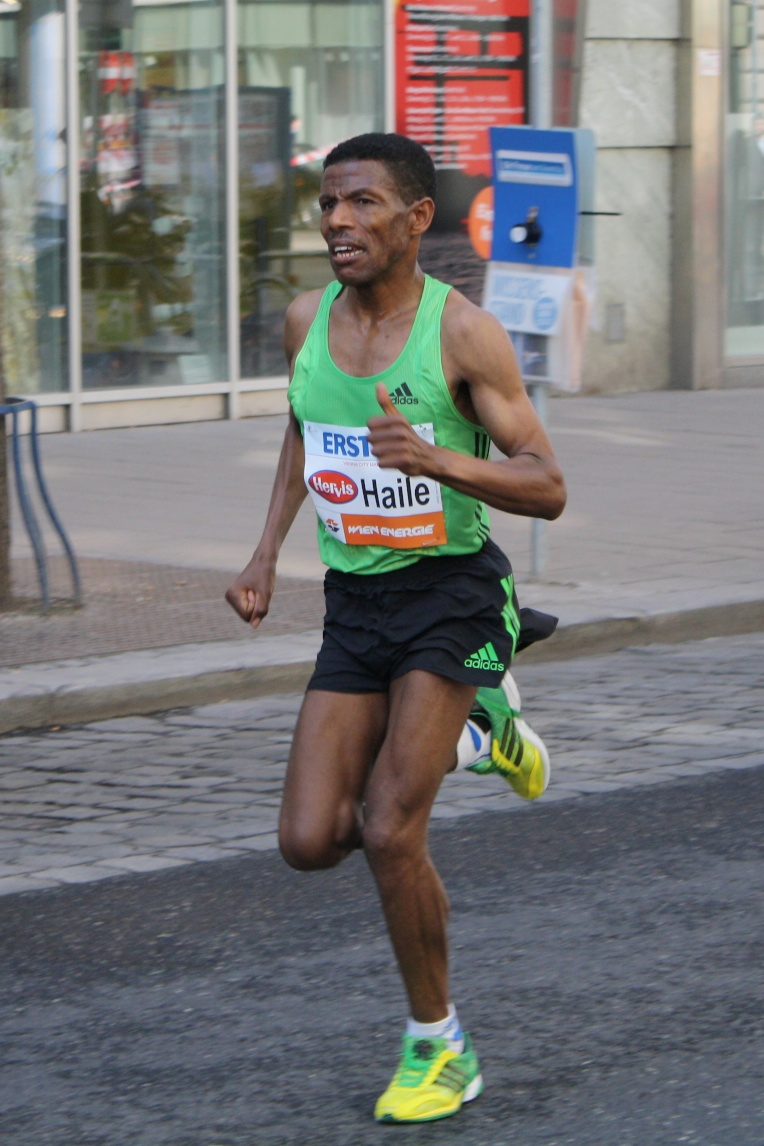
Haile Gebrselassie first won in 1994 and won for a third time in 2011.

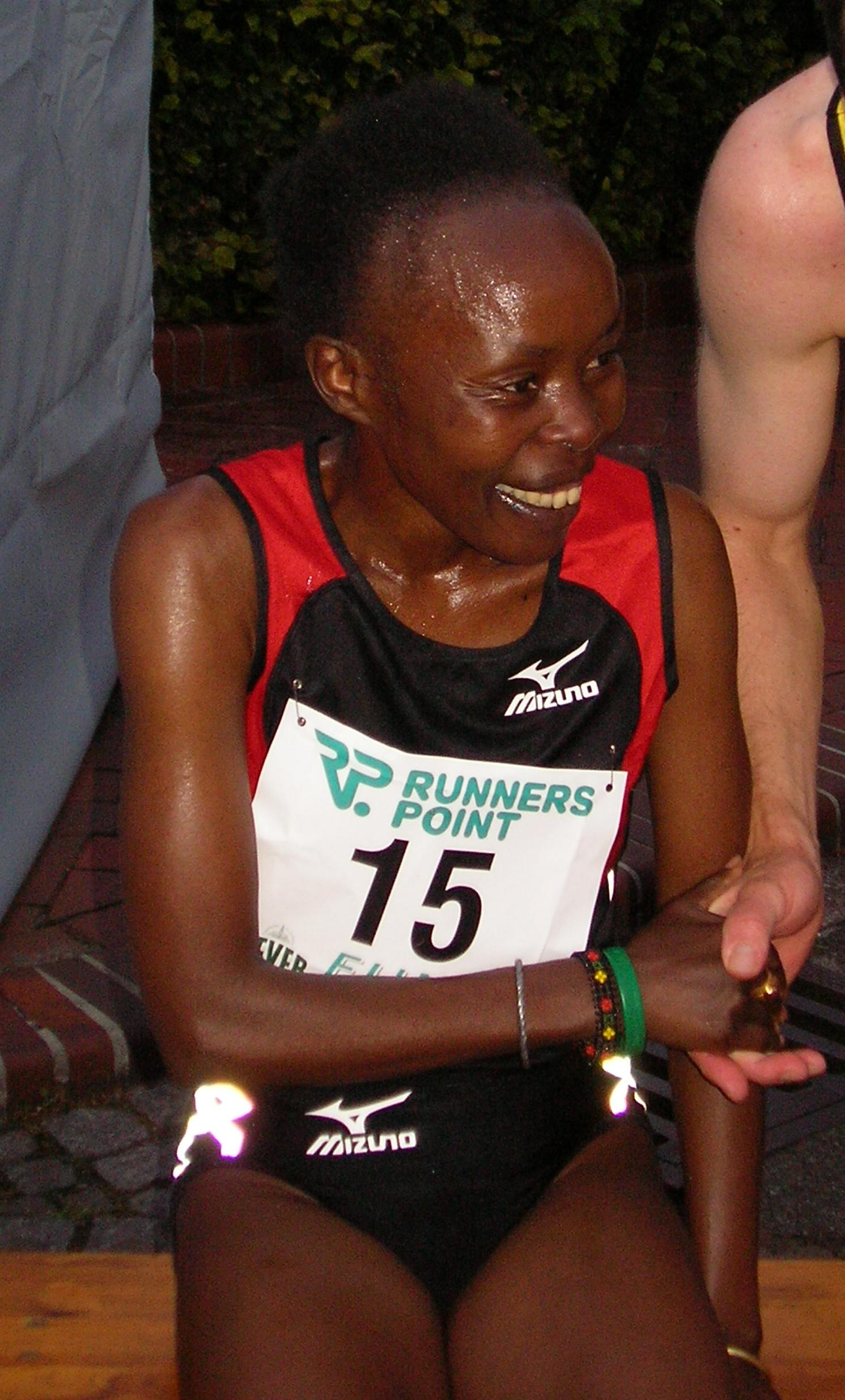
Kenya's Tegla Loroupe won the race three times in the 1990s.

Winners of the Zevenheuvelenloop
Year	Men's winner	Time	Note	Women's winner	Time	Note	Ref
1984	Leon Wijers (NED)	36:55	12 km	Anne Rindt (NED)	45:48	12 km	
1985	Klaas Lok (NED)	45:28	CR	Joke Menkveld (NED)	57:28	CR	
1986	Sam Carey (GBR)	46:2		Denise Verhaert (BEL)	53:33	CR	
1987	Marti ten Kate (NED)	45:11	CR	Gerrie Timmermans (NED)	57:16		
1988	Robin Bergstrand (GBR)	46:20		Marianne van de Linde (NED)	52:53	CR	
1989	Tonnie Dirks (NED)	43:31	CR	Carla Beurskens (NED)	50:36	CR	
1990	Tonnie Dirks (NED)	44:53		Carla Beurskens (NED)	52:06		
1991	Tonnie Dirks (NED)	44:09		Ingrid Kristiansen (NOR)	48:46	CR	
1992	Carl Thackery (GBR)	43:54		Tegla Loroupe (KEN)	50:53		
1993	Khalid Skah (MAR)	43:35		Tegla Loroupe (KEN)	50:06		
1994	Haile Gebrselassie (ETH)	43:00	CR	Liz McColgan (GBR)	49:56		
1995	Josephat Machuka (KEN)	42:23	CR	Hellen Kimaiyo (KEN)	49:44		
1996	Josephat Machuka (KEN)	43:06		Marleen Renders (BEL)	50:09		
1997	Worku Bikila (ETH)	42:20	CR	Catherina McKiernan (IRL)	48:30	CR	
1998	Worku Bikila (ETH)	42:24		Tegla Loroupe (KEN)	50:06		
1999	Mohammed Mourhit (BEL)	43:30		Lyubov Morgunova (RUS)	49:45		
2000	Felix Limo (KEN)	42:53		Berhane Adere (ETH)	48:06	CR	
2001	Felix Limo (KEN)	41:29	WB	Rose Cheruiyot (KEN)	48:40		
2002	Kamiel Maase (NED)	43:41		Irvette van Blerk (RSA)	51:06		
2003	Richard Yatich (KEN)	42:43		Mestawet Tufa (ETH)	49:06		
2004	Sileshi Sihine (ETH)	41:38		Lydia Cheromei (KEN)	47:02	CR	
2005	Haile Gebrselassie (ETH)	41:56		Berhane Adere (ETH)	47:46		
2006	Micah Kogo (KEN)	42:42		Mestawet Tufa (ETH)	47:22		
2007	Sileshi Sihine (ETH)	42:24		Bezunesh Bekele (ETH)	47:36		
2008	Ayele Abshero (ETH)	42:17		Mestawet Tufa (ETH)	46:57	CR	
2009	Sileshi Sihine (ETH)	42:14		Tirunesh Dibaba (ETH)	46:29	CR	
2010	Leonard Komon (KEN)	41:13	WB	Genet Getaneh (ETH)	47:53		
2011	Haile Gebrselassie (ETH)	42:44		Waganesh Mekasha (ETH)	48:33		
2012	Nicholas Kipkemboi (KEN)	42:01		Tirunesh Dibaba (ETH)	47:08		
2013	Leonard Komon (KEN)	42:15		Tirunesh Dibaba (ETH)	48:43		
2014	Abera Kuma (ETH)	42:18		Priscah Jeptoo (KEN)	46:56		
2015	Joshua Cheptegei (UGA)	42:39		Yenenesh Tilahun (ETH)	50:05		
2016	Joshua Cheptegei (UGA)	42:08		Susan Krumins (NED)	49:30		
2017	Joshua Cheptegei (UGA)	41:16		Birke Debele (ETH)	48:52		
2018	Joshua Cheptegei (UGA)	41:05	WB	Stella Chesang (UGA)	47:19		
2019	Stephen Kissa (UGA)	41:49		Letesenbet Gidey (ETH)	44:20	WB	
2020	cancelled due to COVID-19						
2021	cancelled due to COVID-19						
2022	Rogers Kibet (UGA)	42:08		Beatrice Chepkoech (KEN)	47:18		
2023	Jacob Kiplimo (UGA)	41:05	=WB	Beatrice Chepkoech (KEN)	47:12		
2024	Jacob Kiplimo (UGA)	40:42	WB	Mizan Alem (ETH)	46:51		
2025	Victor Kipruto (KEN)	41:42		Asmarech Anley (ETH)	47:05		
2026	Alex Matata (KEN)	40:49		Asayech Ayichew (ETH)	45:29		

== Statistics ==
As of 15 November 2026

=== Winners by country ===
Country	Men's race	Women's race	Total
Ethiopia	10	17	27
Kenya	11	9	20
Netherlands	7	7	14
Uganda	8	1	9
United Kingdom	3	1	4
Belgium	1	2	3
Ireland	0	1	1
Morocco	1	0	1
Norway	0	1	1
Russia	0	1	1
South Africa	0	1	1

=== Multiple winners ===
Athlete	Country	M/W	Wins	Years
Joshua Cheptegei	Uganda	M	4	2015, 2016, 2017, 2018
Tonnie Dirks	Netherlands	M	3	1989, 1990, 1991
Tegla Loroupe	Kenya	W	3	1992, 1993, 1998
Mestawet Tufa	Ethiopia	W	3	2003, 2006, 2008
Sileshi Sihine	Ethiopia	M	3	2004, 2007, 2009
Haile Gebrselassie	Ethiopia	M	3	1994, 2005, 2011
Tirunesh Dibaba	Ethiopia	W	3	2009, 2012, 2013
Carla Beurskens	Netherlands	W	2	1989, 1990
Josphat Machuka	Kenya	M	2	1995, 1996
Worku Bikila	Ethiopia	M	2	1997, 1998
Felix Limo	Kenya	M	2	2000, 2001
Berhane Adere	Ethiopia	W	2	2000, 2005
Leonard Komon	Kenya	M	2	2010, 2013
Jacob Kiplimo	Uganda	M	2	2023, 2024

bold italic = world record
