= Tore Sjöstrand =

Swedish steeplechase runner (1921–2011)

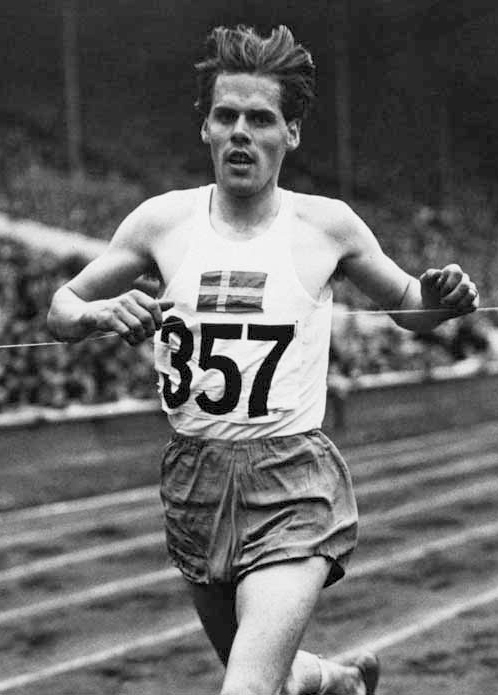
- Tore Sjöstrand in 1948

Personal information
- Born: 31 July 1921 Huddinge, Sweden
- Died: 26 January 2011 (aged 89) Växjö, Sweden
- Height: 1.80 m (5 ft 11 in)
- Weight: 68 kg (150 lb)

Sport
- Sport: Athletics
- Event: Steeplechase
- Club: Bellevue IK, Stockholm

Achievements and titles
- Personal best: 3000 mS – 8:59.8 (1948)
Medal record
Men's athletics
Representing Sweden
Olympic Games
Gold medal – first place	1948 London	3000 m st.
European Championships
Bronze medal – third place	1946 Oslo	3000 m st.

Thore "Tore" Ingvar Sjöstrand (31 July 1921 – 26 January 2011) was a Swedish steeplechase runner. He won a bronze medal at the 1946 European Championships and a gold medal at the 1948 Summer Olympics.

Domestically Sjöstrand won two titles, in 1947 and 1948, and finished second five times. After finishing eighth at the 1950 European championships he retired and moved to Växjö. There he worked as a retailer and died aged 89.
