= Khalid Choukoud =

Dutch long-distance runner

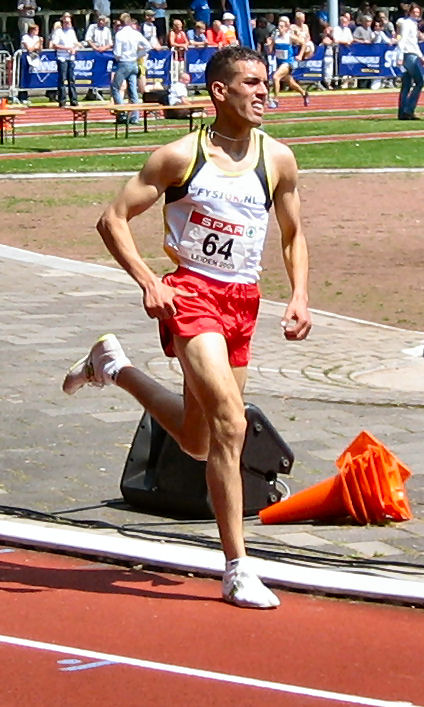

Personal information
- Nationality: Dutch
- Born: 23 March 1986 (age 39) Fez, Morocco

Sport
- Sport: Athletics
- Event: Marathon

Khalid Choukoud (born 23 March 1986) is a Dutch athlete who specializes in the marathon.

On the track, he finished seventh in the 10,000 metres at the 2012 European Championships. He competed without finishing at the 2016 European Championships half marathon.

As of 2025 he is four times national champion.

== Personal bests ==
- Marathon - 2:07:37 (Valencia, 2023)
