= Erik Elmsäter =

Swedish athletics competitor (1919–2006)

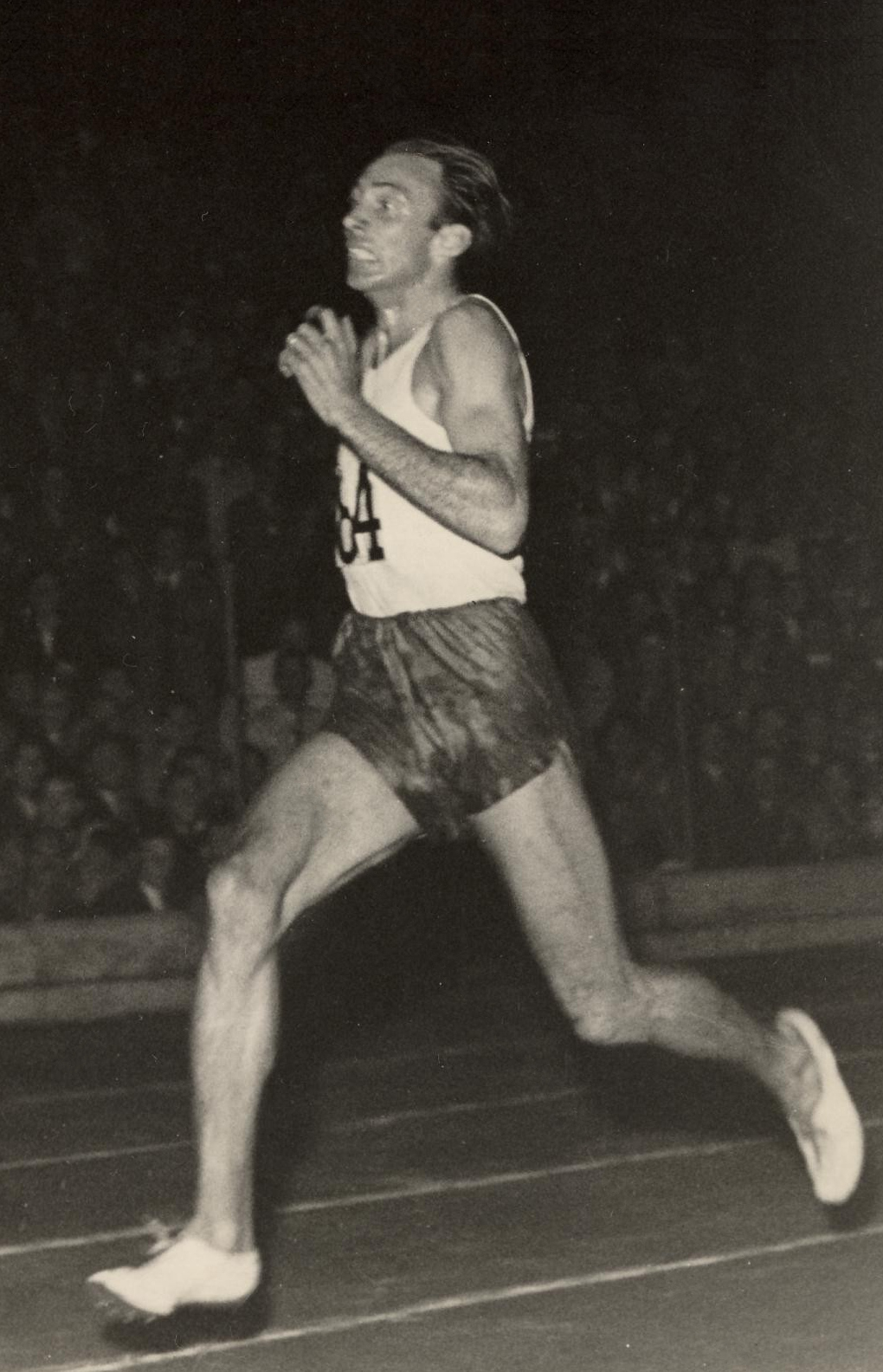

Personal information
- Born: 7 October 1919 Stockholm, Sweden
- Died: 9 March 2006 (aged 86) Stockholm, Sweden

Sport
- Sport: Athletics
- Event: steeplechase
- Club: I13 IF, Falun; IFK Kiruna

Achievements and titles
- Personal best: 3000 mS – 8:59.6 (1944)
Medal record
Men's athletics
Representing Sweden
Olympic Games
Silver medal – second place	1948 London	3000 m st.
European Championships
Silver medal – second place	1946 Oslo	3000 m st.

Fritz Erik Elmsäter (7 October 1919 – 9 March 2006) was the first Swedish athlete to compete in both the Summer and Winter Olympics. In 1948 he won a silver medal in the 3000 m steeplechase race, and finished 19th in the 18 km cross-country skiing and 9th in the Nordic combined event. At the 1952 Winter Olympics, he was the flag bearer for Sweden, and finished 56th in the 18 km skiing race and 13th in the Nordic combined.

== Biography ==
He was born Erik Pettersson and changed his name to Fritz Erik Elmsäter in 1939. A multitalented athlete, he played as a football goalkeeper in the 1930s, and competed in modern pentathlon, military relays and gymnastics. He had his best results in the 3000 m steeplechase. In this event he won four national titles in 1943–1946 and set two world records, becoming in 1944 the first person to run the steeplechase within nine minutes. He won silver medals at the 1946 European Championships and at the 1948 Olympics.

Elmsäter was a career military officer, retiring in 1959 to accept a position at the Swedish Sports Federation. In the 1960s he worked for the Swedish radio and TV network, and between 1968 and 1985 held various managerial position at the Sveriges Television. His daughter Eva is a prominent journalist.

== Cross-country skiing results ==
=== Olympic Games ===
Year	Age	18 km	50 km	4 × 10 km relay
1948	28	19	—	—
1952	32	56	—	—
