= Roger Chesneau =

French former steeplechaser

Roger Georges Chesneau (3 July 1925 – 6 February 2012) was a French steeplechaser who competed in the 1948 Summer Olympics. He died in February 2012 at the age of 86.
