= Annie van Stiphout =

Dutch long-distance runner (born 1952)

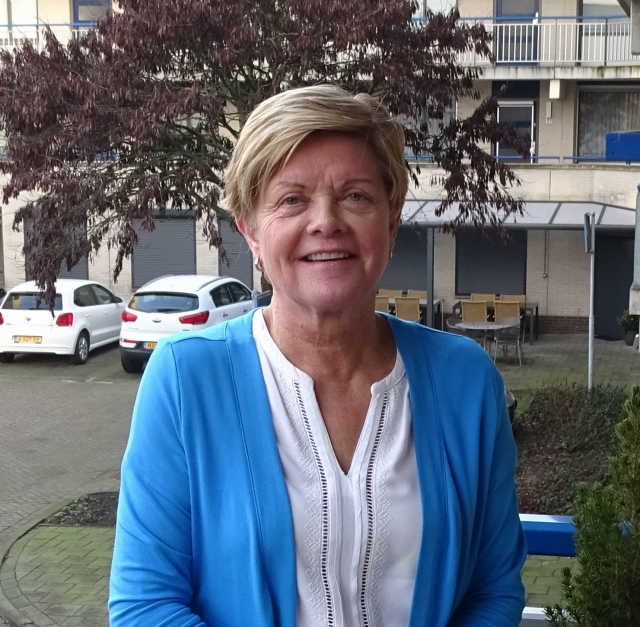
- Annie van de Kerkhof in 2020.

Personal information
- Full name: Annie van Stiphout-van de Kerkhof
- Nationality: Netherlands
- Born: September 30, 1952 (age 73) Helmond, Netherlands

Sport
- Sport: Long-distance running

Achievements and titles
- National finals: Dutch champion 1500 m 1976

Annie van Stiphout-van de Kerkhof (Helmond, 30 September 1952) is a former Dutch long-distance runner. She was an eight-time Dutch champion at various distances (1500 metres to marathon).
