= Alf Olesen =

Danish middle-distance runner

Personal information
- Nationality: Danish
- Born: 19 April 1921 Kristianstad, Sweden
- Died: 27 June 2007 (aged 86) Copenhagen, Denmark

Sport
- Sport: Middle-distance running
- Event: Steeplechase

Alf Olesen (19 April 1921 – 27 June 2007) was a Danish middle-distance runner. He competed in the men's 3000 metres steeplechase at the 1948 Summer Olympics.
