= Alec Olney =

British long-distance runner

Personal information
- Nationality: British (English)
- Born: 4 January 1922 Hampstead, England
- Died: 25 April 2017 (aged 95) Harrow, England

Sport
- Sport: Athletics
- Event: long-distance
- Club: Thames Valley Harriers

Henry Alexander Olney also known as Alec Olney (4 January 1922 – 25 April 2017) was a British long-distance runner who competed in the 1948 Summer Olympics.

== Biography ==
Born Henry Alexander Olney in Hampstead, he went by the name Alec and finished fifth in the English National Cross Country Championships in early 1947. Olney then finished second behind Jef Lataster in the 3 miles event at the 1947 AAA Championships and made his nternational debut against France.

Olney was second again at the 1948 AAA Championships behind Wim Slijkhuis but by virtue of being the highest placed British athlete was considered the British 3 miles champion. Shortly after his AAA success he represented the Great Britain team at the 1948 Olympic Games in London.

In 1949, he won the Southern Counties Cross Country title and after finishing third at the 1949 AAA Championships Olney married Beryl Thurley on 3 September 1949 in Willesden and the following year was on the podium again at the 1950 AAA Championships, runner-up behind Lucien Theys.

Olney competed at the 1950 European Athletics Championships before taking up road racing.
