= Bradiford =

Village in Devon, England

Coordinates: 51.089185°N 4.069734°W

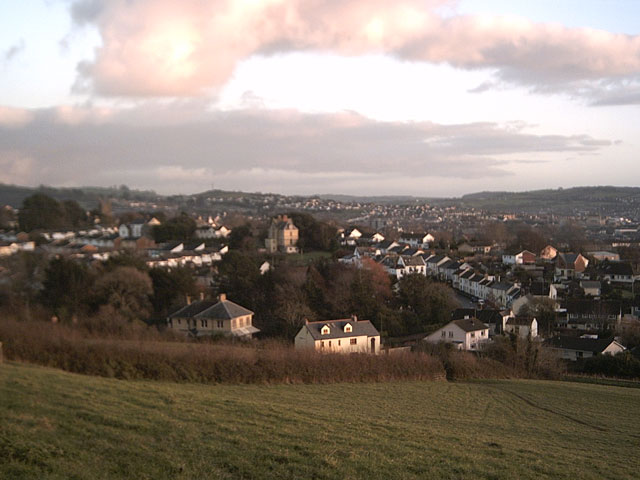
- View of Bradiford from Poleshill Lane

- Location within Devon
- OS grid reference: SS551342
- Shire county: Devon
- Region: South West
- Country: England
- Sovereign state: United Kingdom
- Police: Devon and Cornwall
- Fire: Devon and Somerset
- Ambulance: South Western

Bradiford is a village in Devon, England. It is located in the civil parish of Barnstaple in the non-metropolitan area of North Devon.
