= Robert Everaert =

Belgian long-distance runner

Robert Everaert (30 March 1923 – 19 September 1951) was a Belgian former long-distance runner who competed in the 1948 Summer Olympics.
