= Pentti Siltaloppi =

Finnish runner (1917–2002)

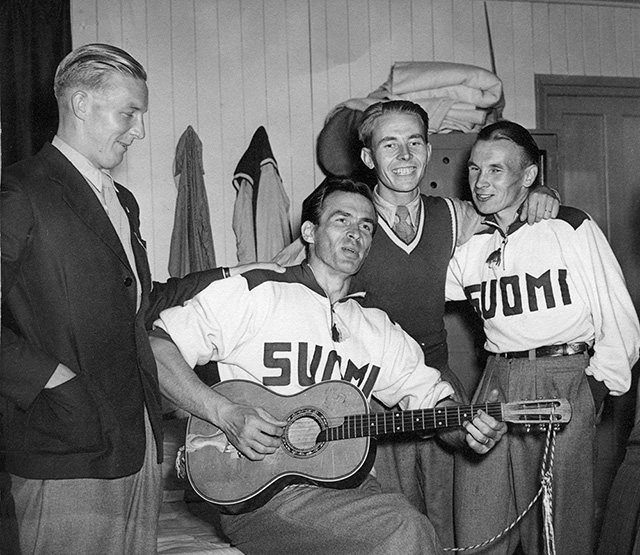
- Siltaloppi (2nd right) at the 1948 Olympics

Personal information
- Born: 29 September 1917 Ilmajoki, Finland
- Died: 18 June 2002 (aged 84) Tampere, Finland
- Height: 179 cm (5 ft 10 in)
- Weight: 67 kg (148 lb)

Sport
- Sport: Athletics
- Event(s): 1500–5000 m, steeplechase
- Club: Tampereen Pyrintö

Achievements and titles
- Personal best(s): 1500 m – 3:51.8 (1947); 5000 m – 14:46.4 (1944); 3000 mS – 9:04.0 (1947)

Pentti Veikko "Loppi" Siltaloppi (29 September 1917 – 18 June 2002) was a Finnish male runner. He competed in the 3000 metres steeplechase at the 1946 European Championships and the 1948 Summer Olympics and finished fifth-sixth.
