= Alexandre Guyodo =

French steeplechase runner

Alexandre "Alex" Guyodo (19 June 1922 – 7 April 2014) was a French steeplechaser who competed in the 1948 Summer Olympics.
