= Jan Zeegers =

Dutch middle-distance runner

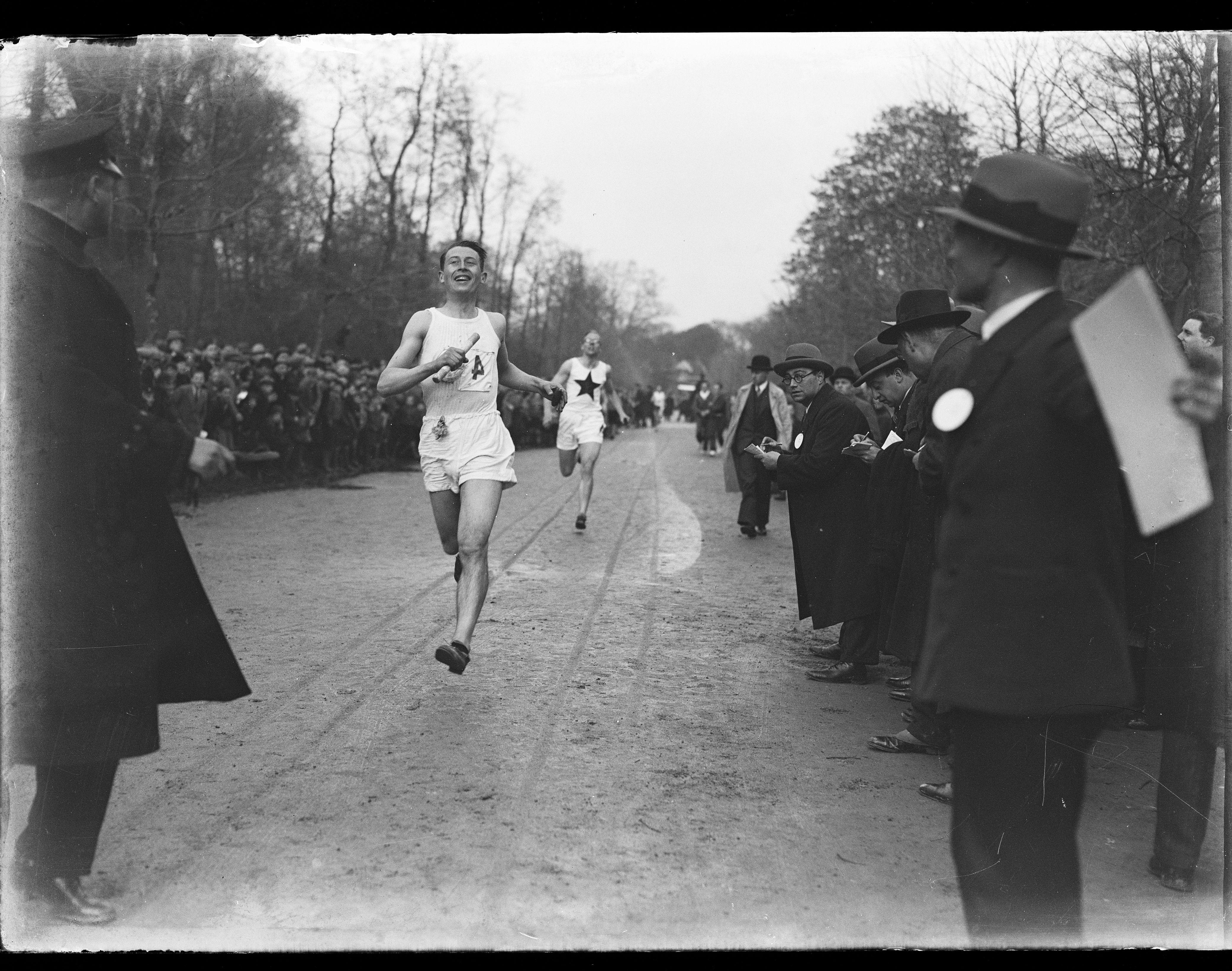
- Zeegers (1923)

Personal information
- Nationality: Dutch
- Born: 28 March 1902 Amsterdam, Netherlands
- Died: 29 November 1978 (aged 76) Amsterdam, Netherlands

Sport
- Sport: Middle-distance running
- Event: 1500 metres

Jan Zeegers (28 March 1902 – 29 November 1978) was a Dutch middle-distance runner. He competed in the 1500 metres at the 1924 Summer Olympics and the 1928 Summer Olympics. He was an older brother of middle-distance runner Guus Zeegers.
