= Miranda Boonstra =

Dutch long-distance runner (born 1972)

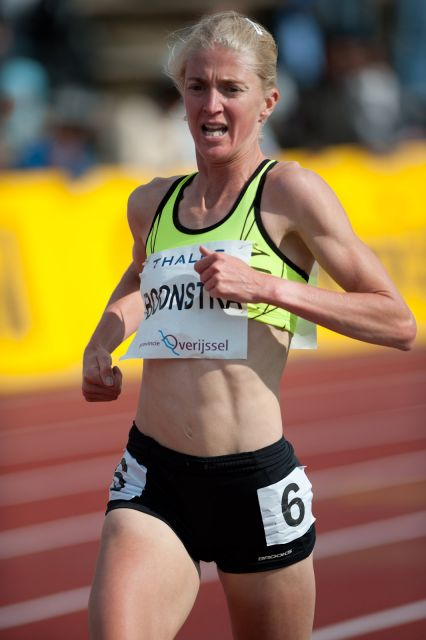
At the FBK Games in Hengelo, the Netherlands (2010)

Miranda Boonstra (29 August 1972) is a Dutch long-distance runner and member of Prins Hendrik Vught and Nijmegen Atletiek.

Boonstra competed in the 2005 World Championships in Athletics.

At the 2006 European Athletics Championships she qualified for the finals and finished in 12th in the 3000 metres steeplechase. In the semifinals of this event she set a national record.

She finished 10th at the 2011 Berlin Marathon.
