= Len Eyre =

British runner (1925–1986)

Personal information
- Nationality: British (English)
- Born: 27 November 1925 Sheffield, England
- Died: November 1986 (aged 60–61) Harrogate, England
- Height: 179 cm (5 ft 10 in)
- Weight: 64 kg (141 lb)

Sport
- Sport: Athletics
- Event: middle-distance
- Club: Leeds Harehills Harriers
Medal record
Athletics
Representing England
Commonwealth Games
| Gold medal – first place | 1950 Auckland | 3 Miles |
| Silver medal – second place | 1950 Auckland | 1 Mile |

Leonard Eyre (27 November 1925 – November 1986) was an English middle and long-distance runner who won gold and silver medals at the British Empire Games.

== Biography ==
He was born in Sheffield and was a member of the Harehills Harriers athletics club, Leeds and won multiple titles in the Leeds & District and Yorkshire areas.

Eyre finished third behind Bill Nankeville in the 1 mile event at the 1949 AAA Championships.

At the 1950 British Empire Games in Auckland he won the gold medal in the 3 miles/5000 metres event, having not regularly competed at that distance and he finished second to Bill Parnell of Canada in the 1 mile event. He was welcomed home by a crowd led by the mayor of Harrogate, Mary Fisher, and driven home to his village of Beckwithshaw in a Rolls-Royce limousine, making an entrance to cheers and the ringing bells of St Michael and All Angels. Shortly after his Empire Games success he finished second at the 1950 AAA Championships, losing out to Nankeville again over the 1 mile distance.

He competed in the 1500 metres at the 1952 Summer Olympic Games in Helsinki, but was eliminated in the heats. He then moved to longer distances. He last competed internationally in 1953 in a Great Britain v Sweden match in which he was 3rd in the 5000 metres. He died aged 60 in 1986.

Eyre won the Civil Service Cross-Country Championship every year from 1948 to 1953, a competition he qualified for by virtue of being a Post Office Saving Department employee.
