= Constantino Miranda =

Spanish long-distance and steeplechase runner (1925–1999)

Constantino Miranda Justo de la Concepción (11 April 1925 – 22 April 1999) was a Spanish long-distance and steeplechase runner who competed in the 1948 Summer Olympics.
