= Jef Lataster =

Dutch long-distance runner

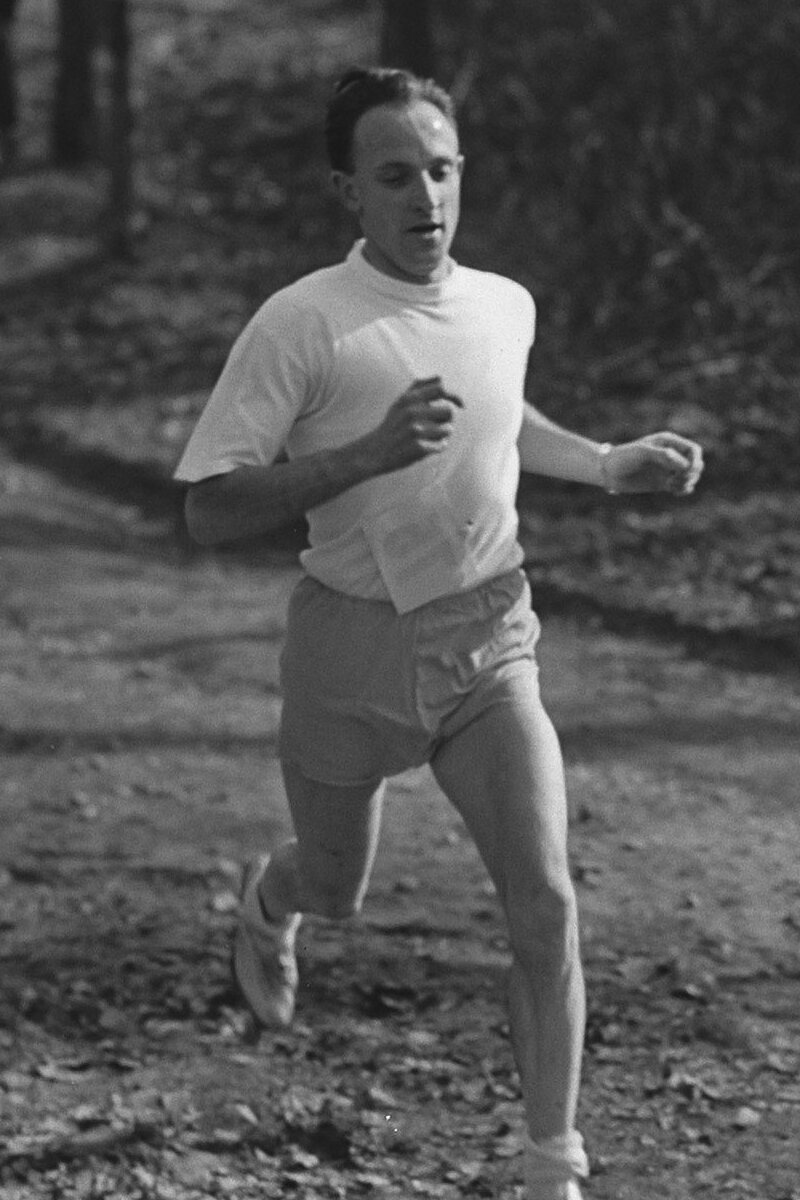
- Jef Lataster in 1951

Personal information
- Born: 27 July 1922 Heerlen, Netherlands
- Died: 16 September 2014 (aged 92) Hulsberg, Limburg, Netherlands
- Height: 176 cm (5 ft 9 in)
- Weight: 64 kg (141 lb)

Sport
- Sport: Athletics
- Event: long-distance
- Club: AVON, Heerlen

Jozef "Jef" Lataster (27 July 1922 – 16 September 2014) was a Dutch long distance runner, who competed in the 1948 Summer Olympics. He was born in Heerlen.

Lataster won the British AAA Championships title in the 3 miles event at the 1947 AAA Championships.

Awards
Preceded by Women's relay team as Sauer Cup	KNAU Cup; 1947	Succeeded by Frits de Ruijter
