= Lucien Theys =

Belgian long-distance runner

Personal information
- Nationality: Belgian
- Born: 25 February 1927 Overijse, Vlaams Brabant, Belgium
- Died: 19 January 1996 (aged 68) Overijse, Vlaams Brabant, Belgium
- Height: 181 cm (5 ft 11 in)
- Weight: 73 kg (161 lb)

Sport
- Sport: Athletics
- Event: middle/long-distance/steeplchase
- Club: Union Saint-Gilloise

Lucien Maurice Theys (25 February 1927 – 19 January 1996) was a Belgian long-distance runner who competed in the 1948 Summer Olympics and in the 1952 Summer Olympics. He was the winner of the 1950 International Cross Country Championships.

Thys won the British AAA Championships title in the 3 miles event at the 1950 AAA Championships.
