= International Cross Country Union =

Former governing body for cross country running

- Successor: International Association of Athletics Federations
- Formation: 1903
- Dissolved: 1973
- Type: Sports federation
- Purpose: governing body for cross country running

The International Cross Country Union (ICCU) was the first major international sports governing body for cross country running. Created in 1903, it launched the International Cross Country Championships that same year. Originally a grouping for contests between the four Home Nations of the British Isles (England, Ireland, Scotland and Wales), the body was symbolic of the increasing co-operation of the older national bodies found in those nations.

The organisation expanded to include France in 1907 and by the 50th annual edition of the championships it included countries of North Africa and Western Europe, the United States, and New Zealand. The appearance of France directly led to the inclusion of athletes of its colonies and ultimately Algeria, Tunisia and Morocco competed independently at the competition. In the late 1960s Tunisia and Morocco hosted the event, reflecting the ICCU's gradual move away from its Western European base.

The body served as the leading international organisation for top level cross country running until 1973, at which point it merged with the International Amateur Athletics Federation (IAAF), which until then had largely been a track and field-oriented body. The Union voted to pass the organisation of the International Championships on to the IAAF in 1971. The decline of the ICCU particularly affected the nations of the United Kingdom, whose national bodies were expelled in favour of the United Kingdom's body and saw the four nations' athletes compete in a merged British team. In contrast, the change benefited the countries with distance running traditions where were not part of the ICCU, such as most of Eastern Europe, East Asia, and East Africa. Athletes from the latter region would soon dominate cross country at the global level.

Although there was cross country running at the Olympics during the ICCU's existence, the events were overseen by the Amateur Athletic Association of England and the International Olympic Committee instead.
