= Marcel Vandewattyne =

Belgian long-distance runner

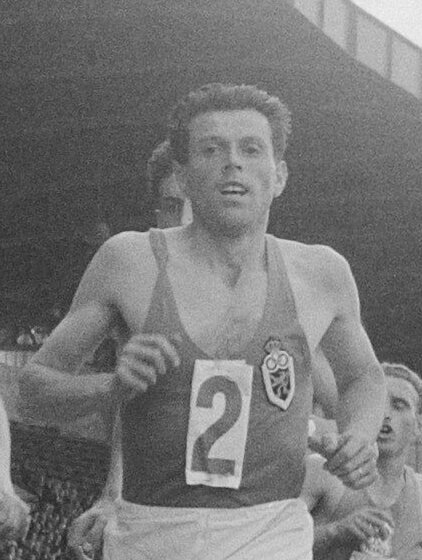
- Vandewattyne in 1957

Personal information
- Nationality: Belgian
- Born: 7 July 1924 Ellezelles, Hainaut, Belgium
- Died: 18 September 2009 (aged 85) Ronse, Oost-Vlaanderen, Belgium

Sport
- Sport: Athletics
- Event: long-distance
- Club: ASSA Ronse

Marcel Eugène Vandewattyne (7 July 1924 – 18 September 2009) was a Belgian long-distance runner who competed in the 1948 Summer Olympics and in the 1952 Summer Olympics.

Vandewattyne won the British AAA Championships title in the steeplechase event at the 1946 AAA Championships and returned several years later to finish second behind Frank Aaron at the 1950 AAA Championships.
