= Three-peat =

Three consecutive championship titles

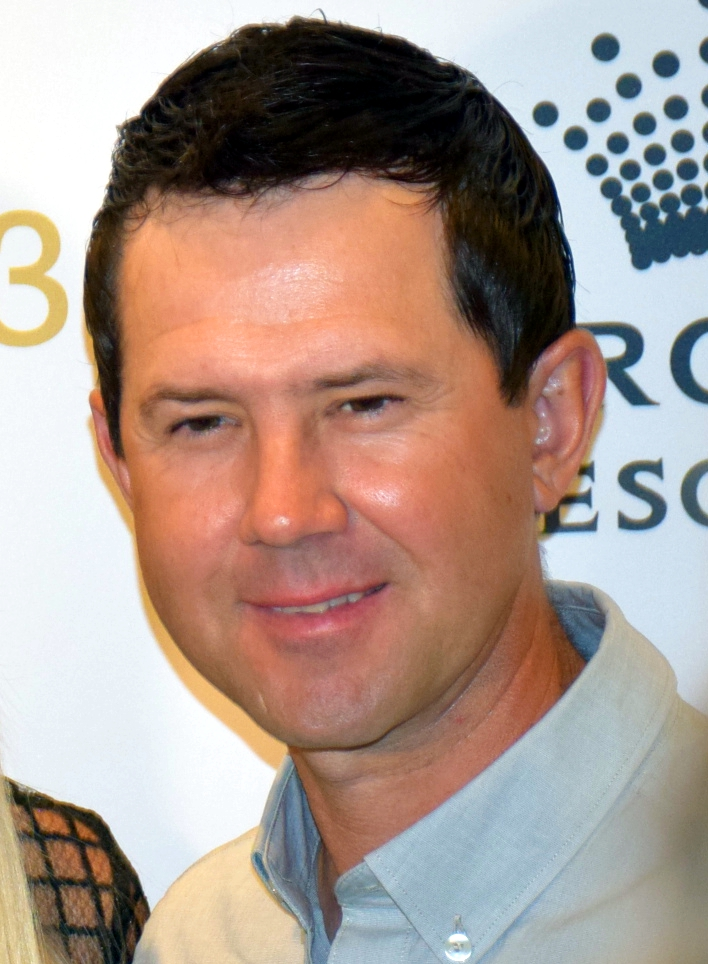
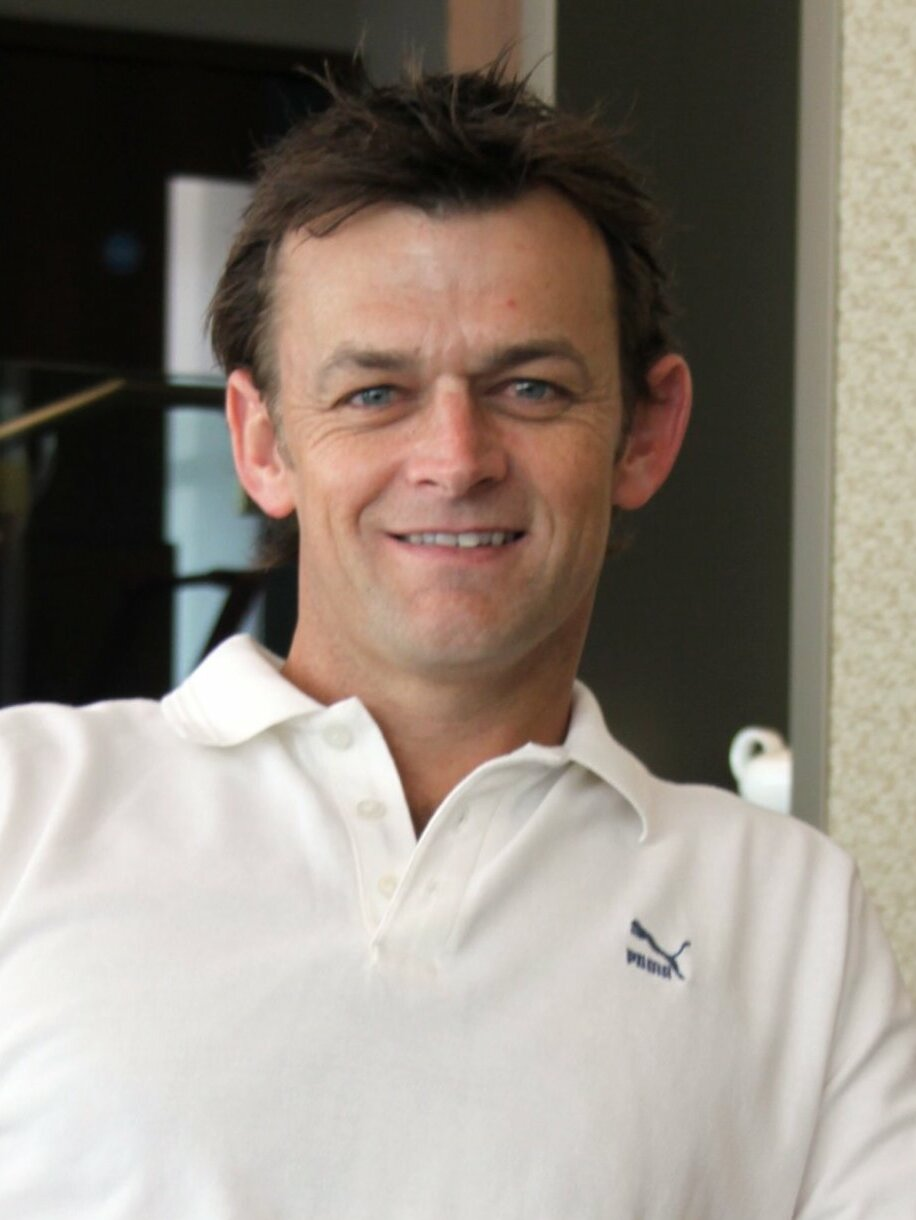
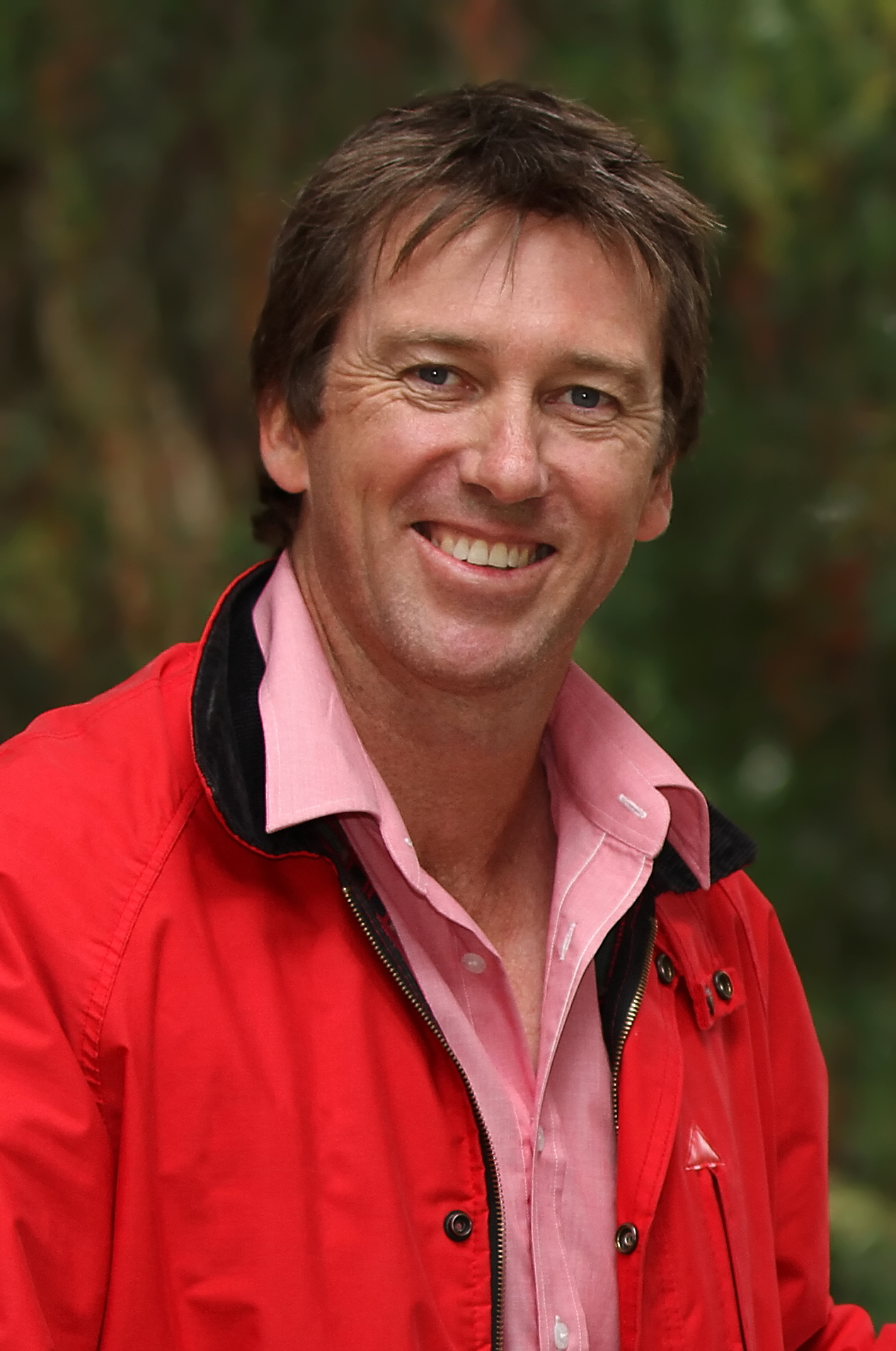
Ricky Ponting (left), Adam Gilchrist (middle) and Glenn McGrath (right) of the Australia national cricket team are the only players to win three Cricket World Cup titles, which they achieved in Australia's three-peat of 1999, 2003 and 2007. The Cricket World Cup is the most prestigious tournament in the sport of Cricket.

In sports (especially in North America), a three-peat is winning three consecutive championships or tournaments. The term, a portmanteau of the words three and repeat, originated with the Los Angeles Lakers of the National Basketball Association, during their unsuccessful campaign for a third consecutive championship during the 1988–89 season, having won the previous two NBA finals.

== Origin ==
The Oxford English Dictionary cites the Newsday newspaper for first publishing the word as a noun, as the Lakers began using the term in 1988. The OED also credits an Illinois high school senior, Sharif Ford, with the earliest published use of the word as a verb in the 8 March 1989, edition of the St. Louis Post-Dispatch. Ford's quote uses the term in a sporting context and serves to provide a clear etymology as well:

The Lincoln High Tigers say they want to "three-peat". "You know, kind of like repeat, except doing it for the third time", senior Sharif Ford said.

In a comedic context, the same play on words, additionally incorporating the name "Pete", is known to have been used as early as 1930 on the radio program Empire Builders. The episode of that program broadcast on 29 December 1930, featured a trio of singers dubbed "The Three Visiting Firemen: Pete, Re-Pete, and Three-Pete".

== Trademark ==
The term is a registered trademark owned by Pat Riley, the Lakers' head coach from 1981 to 1990. The original owner and assignor of the underlying THREE-PEAT "mark" was Bijan Khezri, former president of P.d.P. Paperon De Paperoni, a Delaware corporation. Khezri submitted in November 1988 a trademark application for the use of three-peat on shirts, jackets and hats. Around that time, the phrase was being used by members and fans of the Los Angeles Lakers basketball team, of whom Pat Riley was the head coach, regarding the Lakers' quest that season to obtain what would have been a third successive NBA championship. According to Riley, it was Laker player Byron Scott who cited the term in reference to the team's goal for that season.

After Khezri assigned the trademark to Riley, it remained an entity of Riley's company Riles & Co.. In 1989, Riles & Co. successfully registered the trademark under U.S. Registration Number 1552980. The Lakers did not win a third consecutive NBA championship in 1989, but the Chicago Bulls did in 1993, and Riles & Co. collected royalties from sports apparel makers who licensed the phrase for use on merchandise commemorating that accomplishment.

Riles & Co. subsequently obtained additional registrations expanding the trademark to cover many other kinds of merchandise in addition to apparel. The company then went on to reap additional profits by again licensing the phrase to merchandisers when the Bulls again won three consecutive NBA championships from 1996 through 1998, as well as when the New York Yankees won three straight World Series championships from 1998 through 2000 and when the Lakers won three straight NBA championships from 2000 through 2002. It was the Lakers' second three-peat in franchise history and only their first since moving from Minneapolis. As of 2025, the Lakers are the last team of the four major American professional sports (NHL, MLB, NFL, NBA) to achieve a three-peat. Incidentally, Pat Riley was the head coach of the losing teams (New York Knicks in 1992 and 1993, Miami Heat in 1996 and 1997) that were eliminated by the Bulls during their 1991–93 and 1996–98 three-peats of NBA Championships. Phil Jackson was the head coach of the Bulls for both of these three-peats, and serving in that same capacity for the Lakers when they achieved their second three-peat.

While originating in the United States, the three-peat has been replicated all over the world across different sports. In recent times, Spanish association football club Real Madrid notably became the first club of the modern era to win three consecutive UEFA Champions League titles (2015–16, 2016–17 and 2017–18). The American Rugby club the New England Free Jacks became the first team to win three consecutive MLR titles (2023, 2024, 2025) and the first North American team to complete a three-peat since 2002.

The trademark registration for three-peat has been challenged over the years by those who argue that the term has become too generic in its usage for the trademark to continue to be applicable. However, such arguments have yet to succeed, with the registration continuing to be upheld by the United States Patent and Trademark Office as recently as 2001, in the case of Christopher Wade v. Riles & Co. This challenge documented the transfer of assignment from Khezri to Riles & Co., and upheld the validity of the trademark as originally conceived.

In 2005, a group of individuals attempted to trademark the phrase Three-Pete in anticipation of the (ultimately unsuccessful) attempt that year by the 2005 USC Trojans football team to win a third consecutive national championship. The change in spelling was a reference to the team's head coach Pete Carroll. However, the Patent Office ruled that the change in spelling was not dissimilar enough from Riles & Co.'s three-peat, and denied the registration. Later that year, USC fan Kyle Bunch began selling his own "Three-Pete" T-shirts. He discontinued sales once he was notified that he was infringing upon the Riles & Co. trademark.

== Three-peats in North American leagues/championships ==
There have been numerous instances of teams winning three or more consecutive championships in the National Basketball Association, National Hockey League, Major League Baseball, National Football League, and Australian Football League, most of which occurred prior to the advent of the term three-peat.

=== North America: professional sports ===
==== All-America Football Conference ====
- 1946–1949 Cleveland Browns (4-peat) (also won 1950 NFL title)

==== Arena Football League ====
- 1988–1990 Detroit Drive
- 2012–2014 Arizona Rattlers

==== American Hockey League ====
- 1960–1962 Springfield Indians

Canadian Football League (Grey Cup)

• 1909-11 U of Toronto Varsity Blues

• 1922-24 Queen’s University Gaels

• 1945-47 Toronto Argonauts

• 1954-56 Edmonton Eskimos

• 1978-82 Edmonton Eskimos (5-peat)

==== Champ Car World Series ====
- 2004–2007 Sébastien Bourdais (4-peat)

==== Continental Basketball Association ====
- 1985–1987 Tampa Bay/Rapid City Thrillers

==== ECHL ====
- 2022–2024 Florida Everblades

==== Formula Drift ====
- 2017–2019 James Deane

==== IndyCar Series ====
- 2009–2011 Dario Franchitti
- 2023–2026 Álex Palou (4-peat)

==== Major Indoor Soccer League ====
- 1979–1982 New York Arrows (4-peat)
- 1988–1992 San Diego Sockers (5-peat)

==== Major League Baseball (World Series) ====
- 1936–1939 New York Yankees (4-peat)
- 1949–1953 New York Yankees (5-peat)
- 1972–1974 Oakland Athletics
- 1998–2000 New York Yankees

==== Major League Rugby (MLR Championship) ====
- 2023–2025 New England Free Jacks

==== NASCAR Cup Series ====
- 1976–1978 Cale Yarborough
- 2006–2010 Jimmie Johnson (5-peat)

==== National Basketball Association (NBA Finals) ====
- 1952–1954 Minneapolis Lakers
- 1959–1966 Boston Celtics (8-peat)
- 1991–1993 Chicago Bulls
- 1996–1998 Chicago Bulls
- 2000–2002 Los Angeles Lakers

==== National Football League (NFL champions) ====
- 1929–1931 Green Bay Packers (no post-season; title game began in 1933)
- 1965–1967 Green Bay Packers (won 1965, 1966, and 1967 title games, plus Super Bowl I and Super Bowl II)

==== National Hockey League (Stanley Cup Final) ====
- 1947–1949 Toronto Maple Leafs
- 1956–1960 Montreal Canadiens (5-peat)
- 1962–1964 Toronto Maple Leafs
- 1976–1979 Montreal Canadiens (4-peat)
- 1980–1983 New York Islanders (4-peat)

==== Premier Hockey Federation (Isobel Cup) ====
- 2020–2022 Boston Pride (2020 co-champions with Minnesota Whitecaps)

==== Federal Prospects Hockey League (Commissioner's Cup) ====
- 2024–2026 Binghamton Black Bears

==== U.S. Open Cup ====
- 1965–1967 Greek American Atlas
- 2009–2011 Seattle Sounders FC

==== United Football League ====
- 2022–2024 Birmingham Stallions

==== Women's National Basketball Association (WNBA Finals) ====
- 1997–2000 Houston Comets (4-peat)

=== United States: College Sports ===
NACDA Director's Cup (overall collegiate athletics)

- 1995–2018 Stanford (NCAA Division I) (23-peat)
- 1997–2001 Simon Fraser (NAIA) (5-peat)
- 1999–2011 Williams (NCAA Division III) (12-peat)
- 2000–2003 UC Davis (NCAA Division II) (4-peat)
- 2004–2011 Grand Valley State (NCAA Division II) (8-peat)
- 2005–2011 Azusa Pacific (NAIA) (7-peat)

NAIA National Football Championship

- 2002–2005 Carroll College Fighting Saints (4-peat)

NAIA National Basketball Championship

- 1957–1959 Tennessee State Tigers basketball
- 1970–1972 Kentucky State Thorobreds

NCAA Division I Baseball

- 1970–1974 USC (5-peat)

NCAA Division I Softball

- 1988–1990 UCLA
- 2021–2024 Oklahoma (4-peat)

NCAA Division I Men's Volleyball

- 1970–1972 UCLA
- 1974–1976 UCLA
- 1981–1984 UCLA (4-peat)

NCAA Division I Women's Volleyball

- 2007–2010 Penn State (4-peat)

NCAA Division I Football

Football Bowl Subdivision (FBS)
- 1934–1936 Minnesota (Toledo Cup)
- 1944–1946 Army West Point

Football Championship Subdivision (FCS)
- 2005–2007 Appalachian State University
- 2011–2015 North Dakota State University (5-peat)
- 2017–2019 North Dakota State University

NCAA Division I Men's Basketball

- 1967–1973 UCLA (7-peat)

NCAA Division I Men's Water Polo

- 2008–2013 USC (6-peat)

NCAA Division I Women's Basketball

- 1996–1998 Tennessee
- 2002–2004 Connecticut
- 2013–2016 Connecticut (4-peat)

NCAA Division I Men's Cross Country

- 1944–1946 Drake
- 1966–1968 Villanova
- 1978–1981 UTEP (4-peat)
- 1990–1993 Arkansas (4-peat)
- 1998–2000 Arkansas
- 2016–2018 Northern Arizona
- 2020–2022 Northern Arizona

NCAA Division II Women's Basketball

- 1993–1996 North Dakota State Bison (4-peat)
- 1997–1999 North Dakota Fighting Sioux

NCAA Division III Women's Basketball

- 1998–2001 Washington (4-peat)

NCAA Division I Women's Soccer

- 1982–1984 North Carolina
- 1986–1994 North Carolina (9-peat)

NCAA Division II Football Championship

- 1993–1995 North Alabama

NCAA Division III Football

- 1983–1986 Augustana College (Illinois) (4-peat)
- 1996–1998 Mount Union
- 2000–2002 Mount Union
- 2009–2011 Wisconsin–Whitewater Warhawks

U.S. National Collegiate Club Rugby championships

- 1980–1983 California (4-peat)
- 1991–2002 California (12-peat)
- 2004–2008 California (5-peat)
- 2012–2014 BYU

=== United States: tabletop games ===
Warhammer 40k American Team Championships

- Team Happy 2015–2017

=== United States: marching arts ===
- The Cadets Drum and Bugle Corps won the Drum Corps International World Championship in 1983–1985.
- The Cavaliers Drum and Bugle Corps three-peated 2000–2002 (2000 was a tie with the Cadets).
- The Blue Devils Drum and Bugle Corps won the Drum Corps International World Championships in 2019–2023 (2020 and 2021 were not scored due to the COVID-19 pandemic).

== Three-peats in domestic leagues/championships ==
=== Australian Football ===
==== Australia ====
WAFL

- 1908–1911 East Fremantle
- 1919–1923 East Perth
- 1928–1931 East Fremantle
- 1938–1940 Claremont
- 1952–1954 South Fremantle
- 1961–1963 Swan Districts
- 1966–1968 Perth
- 1982–1984 Swan Districts
- 2000–2002 East Perth
- 2006–2008 Subiaco

AFL

- 1906–1908 Carlton
- 1927–1930 Collingwood (4-peat)
- 1939–1941 Melbourne
- 1955–1957 Melbourne
- 2001–2003 Brisbane Lions
- 2013–2015 Hawthorn
- 2024–2026 Brisbane Lions

SANFL

- 1878–1883 Norwood (6-peat)
- 1887–1889 Norwood
- 1954–1959 Port Adelaide (6-peat)
- 1966–1970 Sturt
- 1979–1981 Port Adelaide
- 1988–1990 Port Adelaide
- 1994–1996 Port Adelaide
- 2003–2005 Central District
- 2007–2010 Central District (4-peat)
- 2012–2014 Norwood

==== Germany ====
Australian Football League Germany

- 2007–2009 Rheinland Lions
- 2021–2023 Berlin Crocodiles

=== American Football ===
==== Costa Rica ====
Costa Rica, American Football 1st Division:

- 2010–2012 Santa Ana Bulldogs

=== Association Football ===
==== Argentina ====
First Division (association football)

- 1949–1951 Racing Club
- 1955–1957 River Plate
- Metro 1979–Metro 1980 River Plate
- Apertura 1996–Apertura 1997 River Plate

==== Belgium ====
Belgian Pro League

- 1900–1903 Racing de Bruxelles
- 1904–1907 R Union Saint-Gilloise
- 1924–1926 Beerschot
- 1933–1935 R Union Saint-Gilloise SR
- 1949–1951 RSC Anderlechtois
- 1954–1956 RSC Anderlechtois
- 1964–1968 RSC Anderlechtois (5-peat)
- 1969–1971 R Standard Liège
- 1976–1978 Club Brugge
- 1985–1987 Anderlecht
- 1993–1995 Anderlecht
- 2012–2014 Anderlecht
- 2020–2022 Club Brugge

==== Brazil ====
Brazilian Championship

- 2006–2008 São Paulo FC

==== Bulgaria ====
Bulgarian A PFG

- 1993–1995 Levski Sofia
- 2000–2002 Levski Sofia
- 2012–2025 PFC Ludogorets Razgrad (14-peat)

==== Chile ====
First Division (Association football):

- 1933–1935 Magallanes
- 1989–1991 Colo-Colo
- Apertura 2006–Apertura 2007 Colo-Colo (4-peat)
- Apertura 2011–Apertura 2012 Universidad de Chile
- 2018–2021 Club Deportivo Universidad Católica (4-peat)

==== Croatia ====
Croatian Football League

- 1996–1999 Croatia Zagreb (4-peat)
- 2006–2016 Dinamo Zagreb (11-peat)
- 2018–2024 Dinamo Zagreb (7-peat)

==== Denmark ====
Danish Superliga

- 2009–2011 Copenhagen

==== Egypt ====
Egyptian Premier League

- 1949–1959 Al Ahly (9-peat)
- 1975–1977 Al Ahly
- 1979–1982 Al Ahly (4-peat)
- 1985–1987 Al Ahly
- 1994–2000 Al Ahly (7-peat)
- 2005–2014 Al Ahly (8-peat)
- 2016–2020 Al Ahly (5-peat)

Egypt Cup

- 1945–1947 Al Ahly
- 1949–1951 Al Ahly
- 1957–1960 Zamalek (4-peat)
- 1981–1985 Al Ahly (4-peat)
- 1991–1993 Al Ahly
- 2013–2016 Zamalek (4-peat)

Egyptian Super Cup

- 2006–2009 Al Ahly (4-peat)
- 2011–2016 Al Ahly (4-peat)
- 2022–2024 Al Ahly

==== England ====
English football First Tier

- 1924–1926 Huddersfield Town
- 1933–1935 Arsenal
- 1982–1984 Liverpool
- 1999–2001 Manchester United
- 2007–2009 Manchester United
- 2021–2024 Manchester City (4-peat)

FA Cup

- 1876–1878 Wanderers
- 1884–1886 Blackburn Rovers

Football League/EFL Cup

- 1981–1984 Liverpool (4-peat)
- 2018–2021 Manchester City (4-peat)

FA Charity/Community Shield

- 1964–1966 Liverpool
- 1984–1987 Everton (4-peat)
- 1988–1990 Liverpool

==== Finland ====
Veikkausliiga

- 1998–2000 Haka
- 2009–2014 HJK (6-peat)
- 2020–2023 HJK (4-peat)

==== France ====
Ligue 1

- 1902–1904 Roubaix
- 1967–1970 Saint-Étienne (4-peat)
- 1974–1976 Saint-Étienne
- 1989–1992 Marseille (4-peat)
- 2002–2008 Lyon (7-peat)
- 2013–2016 Paris Saint-Germain (4-peat)
- 2018–2020 Paris Saint-Germain
- 2022–2026 Paris Saint-Germain (5-peat)

==== Germany ====
Bundesliga

- 1972–1974 Bayern Munich
- 1975–1977 Borussia Mönchengladbach
- 1985–1987 Bayern Munich
- 1999–2001 Bayern Munich
- 2013–2023 Bayern Munich (11-peat)

DDR-Oberliga

- 1976–1978 SG Dynamo Dresden
- 1979–1988 Berliner FC Dynamo (10-peat)

==== Indonesia ====
Super League (Indonesia)

- 2024–2026 Persib Bandung

==== Iran ====
Persian Gulf League

- 2016–2021 Persepolis (5-peat)

Iran Super Cup

- 2017–2020 Persepolis (4-peat)

==== Iraq ====
Iraq Stars League

- 1987–1989 Al-Rasheed
- 1994–1996 Al-Zawraa
- 1999–2001 Al-Zawraa
- 2007–2009 Erbil
- 2022–2025 Al-Shorta (4-peat)

Iraq FA Cup

- 1989–1991 Al-Zawraa
- 1993–1996 Al-Zawraa (4-peat)
- 1998–2000 Al-Zawraa

Umm al-Ma'arik Championship

- 2000–2002 Al-Shorta

Iraqi Super Cup

- 1998–2000 Al-Zawraa

Iraq Central FA Premier League

- 1950–1956 Al-Haras Al-Malaki (7-peat)
- 1968–1970 Aliyat Al-Shorta

==== Israel ====
Liga Leumit

- 1959–1963 Hapoel Petah Tikva (5-peat)

Israeli Premier League

- 2004–2006 Maccabi Haifa
- 2013–2015 Maccabi Tel Aviv
- 2016–2018 Hapoel Be'er Sheva
- 2021–2023 Maccabi Haifa

==== Italy ====
Italian Football Championship

- 1898–1900 Genoa
- 1902–1904 Genoa
- 1911–1913 Pro Vercelli

Serie A

- 1931–1935 Juventus (5-peat)
- 1943, 1946–1949 Torino (5-peat)
- 1992–1994 Milan
- 2006–2010 Internazionale (5-peat)
- 2012–2020 Juventus (9-peat)

Coppa Italia

- 2015–2018 Juventus (4-peat)

==== Japan ====
J1 League

- 2007–2009 Kashima Antlers

==== Mexico ====
Liga MX

- 2023 – 2024 Club América

==== Netherlands ====
Eredivisie

- 1897–1899 RAP Amsterdam
- 1900–1903 HVV (4-peat)
- 1911–1913 Sparta
- 1966–1968 Ajax
- 1986–1989 PSV (4-peat)
- 1994–1996 Ajax
- 2005–2008 PSV (4-peat)
- 2011–2014 Ajax (4-peat)
- 2024–2026 PSV

==== Norway ====
Tippeligaen

- 1972–1975 Viking (4-peat)
- 1992–2004 Rosenborg (13-peat)
- 2015–2018 Rosenborg (4-peat)

==== Philippines ====
National Men's Championship

- 1915–1922: Bohemian Sporting Club (7-peat, no tournament held on 1919)
- 1930–1933: San Beda Athletic Club

PFL

- 2017–2020: Ceres–Negros/United City (4-peat)

==== Portugal ====
Primeira Liga

- 1936–1938 Benfica
- 1947–1949 Sporting CP
- 1951–1954 Sporting CP (4-peat)
- 1963–1965 Benfica
- 1967–1969 Benfica
- 1971–1973 Benfica
- 1975–1977 Benfica
- 1995–1999 Porto (5-peat)
- 2006–2009 Porto (4-peat)
- 2011–2013 Porto
- 2014–2017 Benfica (4-peat)

==== Russia ====
Russian Football Premier League

- 1992–1994 Spartak Moscow
- 1996–2001 Spartak Moscow (6-peat)
- 2019–2024 Zenit Saint Petersburg (6-peat)

==== Scotland ====
Scottish football league system first tier

- 1966–1974 Celtic (9-peat)
- 1989–1997 Rangers (9-peat)
- 2012–2020 Celtic (9-peat)
- 2022–2026 Celtic (5-peat)

Scottish Cup

- 1874–1876 Queen's Park
- 1877–1879 Vale of Leven
- 1880–1882 Queen's Park
- 1934–1936 Rangers
- 1948–1950 Rangers
- 1962–1964 Rangers
- 1982–1984 Aberdeen
- 2017–2020 Celtic (4-peat)

==== Serbia ====
Serbian SuperLiga

- 2008–2013 Partizan (6-peat)
- 2018–2024 Red Star Belgrade (7-peat)

==== Slovenia ====
Slovenian PrvaLiga

- 1991–1995 Olimpija (4-peat)
- 1996–2003 Maribor (7-peat)
- 2003–2006 Gorica
- 2010–2015 Maribor (5-peat)

==== Spain ====
La Liga

- 1961–1965 Real Madrid (5-peat)
- 1967–1969 Real Madrid
- 1978–1980 Real Madrid
- 1986–1990 Real Madrid (5-peat)
- 1991–1994 Barcelona (4-peat)
- 2009–2011 Barcelona

Copa del Rey

- 1905–1908 Real Madrid (4-peat)
- 1914–1916 Athletic Bilbao
- 1930–1933 Athletic Bilbao (4-peat)
- 1943–1945 Athletic Bilbao
- 1951–1953 Barcelona
- 2015–2018 Barcelona (4-peat)

South Africa

South African Premier Division

- 1998–2000 Mamelodi Sundowns
- 2008–2010 Supersport United
- 2018–2023 Mamelodi Sundowns (6-peat)

==== South Korea ====
K League 1

- 1993–1995 Ilhwa Chunma (changed to Seongnam Ilhwa Chunma)
- 2001–2003 Seongnam Ilhwa Chunma (changed to Seongnam FC)
- 2017–2021 Jeonbuk Hyundai Motors (5-peat)

==== Sweden ====
Allsvenskan

- 1945–1948 IFK Norrköping
- 1949–1951 Malmö FF
- 1985–1989 Malmö FF
- 1993–1996 IFK Göteborg

==== Turkey ====
Süper Lig

- 1971–1973 Galatasaray
- 1979–1981 Trabzonspor
- 1990–1992 Beşiktaş
- 1997–2000 Galatasaray (4-peat)
- 2023–2026 Galatasaray (4-peat)

Turkish Cup

- 1963–1966 Galatasaray (4-peat)
- 2014–2016 Galatasaray

==== USSR ====
Soviet Top League

- 1946–1948 CSKA Moscow
- 1966–1968 Dynamo Kyiv

==== United Arab Emirates ====
UAE Pro League

- 2001–2004 Al Ain

==== Yugoslavia ====
Yugoslav First League

- 1933, 1935–36 BSK Beograd
- 1961–1963 Partizan
- 1968–1970 Red Star Belgrade
- 1990–1992 Red Star Belgrade

=== Baseball ===
==== Puerto Rico ====
Baseball

- 1941/42–1944/45 Ponce (4-peat)
- 1996/97–1998/99 Indios de Mayaguez

==== Japan ====
Nippon Professional Baseball

- 1951–1953 Yomiuri Giants
- 1956–1958 Nishitetsu Lions (changed to Seibu Lions)
- 1965–1973 Yomiuri Giants (9-peat)
- 1975–1977 Hankyu Braves (changed to Orix Buffaloes)
- 1986–1988 Seibu Lions (changed to Saitama Seibu Lions)
- 1990–1992 Seibu Lions (changed to Saitama Seibu Lions)
- 2017–2020 Fukuoka SoftBank Hawks (4-peat)

==== South Korea ====
KBO League

- 1986–1989 Haitai Tigers (changed to Kia Tigers) (4-peat)
- 2011–2014 Samsung Lions (4-peat)

==== Taiwan ====
Chinese Professional Baseball League

- 1992–1994 Brother Elephants (changed to CTBC Brothers)
- 1997–1999 Wei Chuan Dragons
- 2001–2003 Brother Elephants (changed to CTBC Brothers)
- 2007–2009 Uni-President 7-Eleven Lions
- 2017–2019 Lamigo Monkeys (changed to Rakuten Monkeys)

=== Basketball ===
==== Argentina ====
Liga Nacional de Básquet

- 2010–2012 Club Atlético Peñarol (Mar del Plata)
- 2015–2018 San Lorenzo de Almagro (basketball) (4-peat)

==== Czech Republic ====
Czech National Basketball League:

- 1994–1996 Basket Brno
- 2004–2022 ERA Nymburk (19-peat)

==== France ====
LNB Pro A

- 1983–1985 Limoges CSP
- 1988–1990 Limoges CSP
- 2019–2022 LDLC Asvel

==== Germany ====
Basketball Bundesliga

- 1970–1972 TuS 04 Leverkusen
- 1990–1996 TSV Bayer 04 Leverkusen
- 1997–2003 ALBA Berlin (7-peat)
- 2010–2013 Brose Baskets (4-peat, also won the German Cup in 2010, 2011 and 2012)
- 2020–2022 ALBA Berlin

==== Iraq ====
Iraqi Professional Basketball League

- 1981–1983 Al-Karkh
- 1986–1990 Al-Rasheed (5-peat)
- 2000–2002 Al-Karkh
- 2009–2012 Duhok (4-peat)
- 2017–2023 Al-Naft (6-peat)

Iraqi Basketball Perseverance Cup

- 2017–2021 Al-Naft

==== Israel ====
Israeli Basketball Premier League

- 1957–1959 Maccabi Tel Aviv
- 1962–1964 Maccabi Tel Aviv
- 1970–1992 Maccabi Tel Aviv (23-peat)
- 1994–2007 Maccabi Tel Aviv (14-peat)
- 2018–2021 Maccabi Tel Aviv (4-peat)

==== Italy ====
Lega Basket Serie A

- 1946–1949 Virtus Bologna (4-peat)
- 1950–1954 Olimpia Milano (5-peat)
- 1957–1960 Olimpia Milano (4-peat)
- 1965–1967 Olimpia Milano
- 1969–1971 Varese
- 1985–1987 Olimpia Milano
- 2007–2011 Mens Sana Siena (Five-peat; 2012 and 2013 are revoked by the Italian Basketball Federation
- 2022–2024 Olimpia Milano

==== New Zealand ====
National Basketball League (Australia)

- 2011–2013 New Zealand Breakers

==== Philippines ====
In the Philippines, a similar concept of a grand slam, winning all 3 conferences (tournaments) in sequence in a single season exists. Leagues such as the PBA, PVL, and formerly PBL and MICAA had used this format.

A conventional definition of three-peat, winning a conference championship in three or more consecutive seasons, can also be applied:

PBA

- 1977–1979: Toyota Tamaraws (Invitational Championship)
- 1979–1984: Crispa Redmanizers (4-peat, All-Filipino Conference, no tournament held from 1981–1982)
- 1987–1989: San Miguel Beer (Reinforced Conference)
- 1994–1997: Alaska Milkmen (4-peat, Governors' Cup)
- 2011–2013: Talk 'N Text Tropang Texters (Philippine Cup)
- 2015–2019: San Miguel Beermen (5-peat, Philippine Cup)

PBA D-League

- 2011–2013: NLEX Road Warriors (Aspirants' Cup)
- 2022–2024: EcoOil–De La Salle (Aspirants' Cup)

==== Puerto Rico ====
BSN basketball

- 1941–1943 Atléticos de San Germán
- 1947–1950 Atléticos de San Germán (4-peat)
- 1955–1957 Cardenales de Rio Piedras
- 1964–1966 Leones de Ponce
- 1971–1975 Vaqueros de Bayamon (5-peat)
- 1977–1979 Piratas de Quebradillas
- 1998–2001 Cangrejeros de Santurce (4-peat)

==== Russia ====
Russian Basketball Super League 1 (1992–2010)

- 1992–2000 PBC CSKA Moscow (9-peat)
- 2003–2010 PBC CSKA Moscow (8-peat)

Russian Professional Basketball League

- 2011–2013 PBC CSKA Moscow (2011–2013)

VTB United League

- 2012–2019, 2021 PBC CSKA Moscow (9-peat; the 2019–2020 season was cancelled due to the COVID-19 pandemic)

Russian Women's Basketball Premier League

- 1992–1997 WBC CSKA Moscow (6-peat)
- 1998–2001 WBC Dynamo Moscow (4-peat)
- 2004–2006 VBM-SGAU Samara
- 2009–2021 UMMC Ekaterinburg (13-peat)
- 2023–2025 UMMC Ekaterinburg

==== Slovenia ====
Premier A Slovenian Basketball League

- 1991–1999 Olimpija (8-peat)
- 2003–2006 Olimpija
- 2009–2014 Krka (5-peat)
- 2020–2023 Cedevita Olimpija

==== Spain ====
Liga ACB

- 1960–1966 Real Madrid Baloncesto (7-peat)
- 1968–1977 Real Madrid Baloncesto (10-peat)
- 1984–1986 Real Madrid Baloncesto
- 1987–1990 Barcelona (4-peat)
- 1995–1997 Barcelona

Spanish Basketball Cup

- 1945–1947 Barcelona
- 1978–1983 Barcelona (6-peat)

Spanish Basketball Super Cup

- 2018–2023 Real Madrid Baloncesto (6-peat)

==== Switzerland ====
Swiss Basketball League

- 1997–1999 Fribourg
- 2000–2002 Lugano Tigers
- 2010–2012 Lugano Tigers
- 2018–2022 Fribourg (4-peat)

==== Turkey ====
Basketball Super League

- 1970–1973 İTÜ BK
- 1976–1978 Eczacıbaşı
- 1980–1982 Eczacıbaşı
- 1992–1994 Efes Pilsen
- 2001–2004 Efes Pilsen (4-peat)
- 2016–2018 Fenerbahçe
- 2024–2026 Fenerbahçe

Women's Basketball Super League

- 1981–1983 ODTÜ
- 1990–1998 Galatasaray (9-peat)
- 2006–2013 Fenerbahçe (8-peat)
- 2018–2026 Fenerbahçe (8-peat; 2020 canceled due to COVID-19)

==== Vietnam ====
VBA

- 2019–2022 Saigon Heat (three-peat: 2019, 2020, 2022)

=== Canadian Football ===
==== Canada ====
Canadian Rugby Union (pre 1958) / Canadian Football League (post 1958) (Grey Cup):

- 1909–1911 Toronto Varsity Blues
- 1922–1924 Queen's University
- 1945–1947 Toronto Argonauts
- 1954–1956 Edmonton Eskimos
- 1978–1982 Edmonton Eskimos (5-peat)

Collegiate women's basketball

- 2011–2015 Windsor Lancers (5-peat)

=== Cricket ===
==== Australia ====
Queensland Premier Cricket T20

- 2016–2018 Sandgate-Redcliffe Gators (T20 QLD)

==== India ====
Indian cricket's Ranji Trophy

- 1958–1972 Bombay
- 1974–1976 Bombay

==== New Zealand ====
New Zealand cricket's Plunket Shield

- 1936/37–1939/40 Auckland

=== Futsal ===
==== Brazil ====
Taça Brasil de Futsal

- 2003–2008 Malwee/Jaraguá (6-peat)

==== Iraq ====
Iraqi Futsal Premier League

- 2012–2018 Naft Al-Wasat (7-peat)

==== Portugal ====
Campeonato Nacional de Futsal

- 1993–1995 Sporting CP
- 2007–2009 Benfica
- 2016–2018 Sporting CP
- 2021–2024 Sporting CP (4-peat)

Taça de Portugal de Futsal

- 2017–2022 Sporting CP (4-peat) (2017–18, 2018–19, 2019–20, 2021–22)

Taça da Liga de Futsal

- 2018–2020 Benfica

==== Russia ====
Russian Futsal Super League

- 1992–2000 Dina (futsal club) (9-peat)
- 2003–2008 MFK Dinamo Moskva (6-peat; before 2007/08 season renamed into Dinamo-Yamal)
- 2011–2013 MFK Dinamo Moskva (before 2012/13 season renamed into Dinamo Moscow Oblast)

Russian Futsal Cup

- 1995–1999 Dina (futsal club) (5-peat)
- 2008–2011 MFK Dinamo Moskva (4-peat)
- 2013–2015 MFK Dinamo Moskva

==== Spain ====
Primera División de Futsal

- 2002–2005 Boomerang Interviú (4-peat)
- 2011–2013 Barcelona
- 2014–2018 Inter Movistar (5-peat)
- 2021–2023 Barcelona

Copa de España de Futsal

- 1998–2000 Caja Segovia
- 2011–2013 Barcelona

Copa del Rey de Futsal

- 2011–2014 Barcelona (4-peat)
- 2018–2020 Barcelona

Supercopa de España de Futsal

- 1998–2000 Caja Segovia
- 2001–2003 Boomerang Interviú

=== Gaelic football ===
All-Ireland Senior Football Championship

- 1897–1899 Dublin
- 1906–1908 Dublin
- 1915–1918 Wexford (4-peat)
- 1921–1923 Dublin
- 1929–1932 Kerry (4-peat)
- 1897–1899 Dublin
- 1939–1941 Kerry
- 1964–1966 Galway
- 1978–1981 Kerry (4-peat)
- 1984–1986 Kerry
- 2015–2020 Dublin (6-peat)

=== Handball ===
==== France ====
LNH Division 1

- 2015–2026 Paris Saint-Germain Handball (12-peat)

==== Iraq ====
Iraqi Handball Premier League

- 2016–2020 Al-Shorta (5-peat)

==== Slovenia ====
Slovenian First League of Handball

- 1991–2001 Celje (10-peat)
- 2002–2008 Celje (6-peat)
- 2013–2020 Celje (7-peat)

==== Russia ====
Russian Handball Super League

- 1996–1999 Kaustik Volgograd (4-peat)
- 2002–2022 Chekhovskiye Medvedi (21-peat)

==== Spain ====
Liga ASOBAL

- 1956–1961 BM Granollers (6-peat)
- 1962–1965 Atlético Madrid BM (4-peat)
- 1966–1968 BM Granollers
- 1970–1972 BM Granollers
- 1975–1978 CB Alicante (4-peat)
- 1983–1985 Atlético Madrid BM
- 1988–1992 FC Barcelona Handbol (5-peat)
- 1995–2000 FC Barcelona Handbol (5-peat)
- 2007–2010 BM Ciudad Real (4-peat)
- 2011–2023 FC Barcelona Handbol (13-peat)

Copa del Rey

- 1982–1985 FC Barcelona Handbol
- 2013–2023 FC Barcelona Handbol (10-peat)

=== Hurling ===
All-Ireland Senior Hurling Championship

- 1892–1894 Cork
- 1898–1900 Tipperary
- 1911–1913 Kilkenny
- 1941–1944 Cork (4-peat)
- 1949–1951 Tipperary
- 1952–1954 Cork
- 1976–1978 Cork
- 2006–2009 Kilkenny (4-peat)
- 2020–2023 Limerick (4-peat)

National Hurling League

- 1934–1938 Limerick (5-peat)
- 1959–1961 Tipperary
- 1968–1969 Cork (1967–1968, 1968–1969, 1968–1969 Home Final)
- 2012–2014 Kilkenny

=== Ice Hockey ===
==== Australia ====
Australian Ice Hockey League

- 2010–2012 Melbourne Ice

==== USSR ====
Soviet Championship League

- 1948–1950 CSKA Moscow
- 1951–1953 VVS Moscow
- 1958–1961 CSKA Moscow (4-peat)
- 1963–1966 CSKA Moscow (4-peat)
- 1970–1973 CSKA Moscow (4-peat)
- 1977–1989 CSKA Moscow (13-peat)
- 1990–1992 Dynamo Moscow

=== Rugby Union ===
==== Australia & New Zealand ====
Super Rugby (Union)

- 2017–2019 Christchurch Crusaders

==== England ====
Men's Premiership Rugby

- 1991–1994 Bath
- 1999–2001 Leicester Tigers
- 2003–2005 London Wasps

Premiership Women's Rugby

- 2023–2025 Gloucester–Hartpury

Women's Premiership

- 2003–2005 Wasps Women
- 2006–2009 Saracens Women (4-peat)
- 2010–2012 Richmond Women

=== Rugby League ===
==== Australia & New Zealand ====
New South Wales Rugby Football League/Australian Rugby League/National Rugby League

- 1911–1913 Eastern Suburbs
- 1915–1917 Balmain
- 1925–1929 South Sydney (5-peat)
- 1935–1937 Eastern Suburbs
- 1953–1955 South Sydney
- 1956–1966 St. George (11-peat)
- 1981–1983 Parramatta
- 2021–2024 Penrith (4-peat)

==== England ====
Northern Rugby Football Union/Northern Rugby Football League/Rugby Football League/Super League

- 1989/90–1995/96 Wigan (7-peat)
- 2007–2009 Leeds
- 2019–2022 St. Helens (4-peat)

=== Volleyball ===
==== Philippines ====
PVL

- 2022–2024: Creamline Cool Smashers (4-peat, All-Filipino, 2023 season had two All-Filipino conferences)

==== South Korea ====
V-League

- 2008–2014 Daejeon Samsung Fire Bluefangs (7-peat)

== Three-peats in continental and international championships ==
=== Olympics ===
==== Summer Olympics ====
Athletics

- 1956, 1960, 1964, 1968 (United States) Al Oerter, Men's Discus throw (4-peat)
- 1984, 1988, 1992, 1996 (United States) Carl Lewis, Men's Long jump (4-peat)
- 1992, 1996, 2000 (Czechoslovakia) / (Czech Republic) Jan Železný, Men's Javelin throw
- 2008, 2012, 2016 (Jamaica) Usain Bolt, Men's 100m
- 2008, 2012, 2016 (Jamaica) Usain Bolt, Men's 200m
- 2012, 2016, 2020 (Poland) Anita Włodarczyk, Women's Hammer throw
- 2016, 2020, 2024 (Belgium) Nafissatou Thiam, Women's Heptathlon
- 2016, 2020, 2024 (United States) Ryan Crouser, Men's Shot put

Basketball

- 1936–1968 (United States) USA, Men's Basketball tournament (7-peat)
- 1992–2000 (United States) USA, Men's Basketball tournament
- 1996–2024 (United States) USA, Women's Basketball tournament (8-peat)
- 2008–2024 (United States) USA, Men's Basketball tournament (5-peat)

Equestrian

- 2000, 2004, 2008 (Netherlands) Anky van Grunsven, individual dressage

Fencing

- 2012, 2016, 2020 (Hungary) Áron Szilágyi, individual men's sabre

Field Hockey

- 1928, 1932, 1936, 1948, 1952, 1956 / India, Men's Field Hockey tournament (6-peat)

Football

- 2004, 2008, 2012 (United States) USA, Women's Football tournament

Handball

- 1996, 2000, 2004 Denmark, Women's Handball tournament

Sailing

- 2004, 2008, 2012, (United Kingdom) Ben Ainslie, Finn

Shooting

- 2008, 2012, 2016, (South Korea) Jin Jong-oh, Men's 50m pistol

Swimming

- 1956, 1960, 1964 (Australia) Dawn Fraser, Women's 100 metres freestyle
- 1988, 1992, 1996 (Hungary) Krisztina Egerszegi, Women's 200 metres backstroke
- 2004, 2008, 2012, 2016 Michael Phelps, Men's 200-metre individual medley (4-peat)
- 2012, 2016, 2020, 2024 Katie Ledecky, Women's 800 metres freestyle (4-peat)

Volleyball

- 1992, 1996, 2000 Cuba, Women's Volleyball tournament

Water polo

- 1908, 1912, 1920 (United Kingdom) Great Britain, Men's Water polo tournament
- 2000, 2004, 2008 Hungary, Men's Water polo tournament
- 2012, 2016, 2020 (United States) USA, Women's Water polo tournament
- 2016, 2020, 2024 Serbia, Men's Water polo tournament

==== Winter Olympics ====
Curling

- 2006, 2010, 2014 Canada, Men's Curling tournament

Ice Hockey

- 1920, 1924, 1928, 1932 Canada, Men's Ice Hockey tournament (4-peat)
- 1964, 1968, 1972, 1976 Soviet Union, Men's Ice Hockey tournament (4-peat)
- 2002, 2006, 2010, 2014 Canada, Women's Ice Hockey tournament (4-peat)

=== Association Football ===
National team competitions	Club competitions
Men FIFA Confederations Cup: 2005–2013 Brazil; AFC Asian Cup: 1968–1976 Iran; Africa Cup of Nations: 2006–2010 Egypt; CONCACAF Gold Cup: 1993–1998 Mexico; CONCACAF Nations League: 2021–2024 United States; CONMEBOL Copa América: 1945–1947 Argentina; Arab Cup: 1964–1988 Iraq (4-peat); Arabian Gulf Cup: 1970–1976 Kuwait (4-peat)	Men FIFA Club World Cup: 2016–2018 (Spain) Real Madrid; UEFA Champions League: 1956–1960 (Spain) Real Madrid (5-peat); 1971–1973 (Netherlands) Ajax; 1974–1976 (West Germany) Bayern Munich; 2016–2018 (Spain) Real Madrid; UEFA Europa League: 2014–2016 (Spain) Sevilla; CONCACAF Champions League: 1969–1971 (Mexico) Cruz Azul; 2011–2013 (Mexico) Monterrey; CONCACAF Central American Cup: 2023–2025 (Costa Rica) Liga Deportiva Alajuelense; CONMEBOL Copa Libertadores: 1968–1970 (Argentina) Estudiantes de La Plata; 1972–1975 (Argentina) Independiente (4-peat); CAF Cup: 2000–2002 (Algeria) JS Kabylie; African Cup Winners' Cup: 1984–1986 (Egypt) Al Ahly; AFC Cup: 2016–2018 (Iraq) Al-Quwa Al-Jawiya; OFC Champions League: 2011–2017 (New Zealand) Auckland City (7-peat); 2022–2024 (New Zealand) Auckland City; Arab Club Champions Cup: 1985–1987 (Iraq) Al-Rasheed; Arab Cup Winners' Cup: 1991–1993 (Morocco) CO Casablanca

=== Athletics ===
World Athletics Championships

- 1983, 1987, 1991 (United States) Carl Lewis, Men's 100m
- 1997, 1999, 2001 (United States) Maurice Greene, Men's 100m
- 2009, 2011, 2013, 2015 (Jamaica) Usain Bolt, Men's 200m (4-peat)
- 2019, 2022, 2023 (United States) Noah Lyles, Men's 200m
- 2005, 2007, 2009 (United States) Allyson Felix, Women's 200m
- 1993, 1995, 1997, 1999 (United States) Michael Johnson, Men's 400m (4-peat)
- 1995, 1997, 1999 (Denmark) Wilson Kipketer, Men's 800m
- 1991, 1993, 1995 (Algeria) Noureddine Morceli, Men's 1500m
- 1997, 1999, 2001, 2003 (Morocco) Hicham El Guerrouj, Men's 1500m (4-peat)
- 2011, 2013, 2015 (Kenya) Asbel Kiprop, Men's 1500m
- 2011, 2013, 2015 (United Kingdom) Mo Farah, Men's 5000m
- 1993, 1995, 1997, 1999 (Ethiopia) Haile Gebrselassie, Men's 10000m (4-peat)
- 2003, 2005, 2007, 2009 (Ethiopia) Kenenisa Bekele, Men's 10000m (4-peat)
- 2013, 2015, 2017 (United Kingdom) Mo Farah, Men's 10000m
- 2019, 2022, 2023 (Uganda) Joshua Cheptegei, Men's 10000m
- 1983, 1987, 1991 (United States) Greg Foster, Men's 110m hurdles
- 2019, 2022, 2023 (United States) Grant Holloway, Men's 110m hurdles
- 1991, 1993, 1995 (Kenya) Moses Kiptanui, Men's 3000m steeplechase
- 2009, 2011, 2013, 2015 (Kenya) Ezekiel Kemboi, Men's 3000m steeplechase (4-peat)
- 1983, 1987, 1991, 1993 United States of America, Men's 4 × 100 m relay (4-peat)
- 2009, 2011, 2013, 2015 Jamaica, Men's 4 × 100 m relay (4-peat)
- 2005, 2007, 2009, 2011, 2013, 2015 United States of America, Men's 4 × 400 m relay (6-peat)
- 2019, 2022, 2023 United States of America, Men's 4 × 400 m relay
- 2007, 2009, 2011, 2013 United States of America, Women's 4 × 400 m relay (4-peat)
- 2017, 2019, 2022 United States of America, Women's 4 × 400 m relay
- 2017, 2019, 2022 (Qatar) Mutaz Essa Barshim, Men's High jump
- 2015, 2017, 2019 (Russia) Mariya Lasitskene, Women's High jump
- 1983, 1987, 1991, 1993, 1995, 1997 (Soviet Union) / (Ukraine) Sergey Bubka, Men's Pole vault (6-peat)
- 1995, 1997, 1999, 2001 (Cuba) Ivan Pedroso, Men's Long jump (4-peat)
- 2015, 2017, 2019 (United States) Brittney Reese, Women's Long jump
- 2015, 2017, 1999 (United States) Christian Taylor, Men's Triple jump
- 2017, 2019, 2022, 2023 (Venezuela) Yulimar Rojas, Women's Triple jump (4-peat)
- 1987, 1991, 1993 (Switzerland) Werner Gunthor, Men's Shot put
- 1995, 1997, 1999 (Germany) Astrid Kumbernuss, Women's Shot put
- 2007, 2009, 2011, 2013 (New Zealand) Valerie Adams, Women's Shot put (4-peat)
- 1991, 1993, 1995, 1997 (Germany) Lars Riedel, Men's Discus throw (4-peat)
- 2009, 2011, 2013 (Germany) Robert Harting, Men's Discus throw
- 2013, 2015, 2017, 2019, 2022 (Poland) Pawel Fajdek, Men's Hammer throw (5-peat)
- 2001, 2003, 2005 (Cuba) Yipsi Moreno, Women's Hammer throw
- 2013, 2015, 2017 (Poland) Anita Wlodarczyk, Women's Hammer throw
- 1991, 1993, 1995 (United States) Dan O'Brien, Men's Decathlon
- 1997, 1999, 2001 (Czech Republic) Tomas Dvorak, Men's Decathlon
- 2003, 2005, 2007 (Sweden) Carolina Kluft, Men's Heptathlon

=== Chess ===
==== World Chess Championships ====
Unofficial Championships (before 1886)

- 1866–1876 Wilhelm Steinitz

Pre-FIDE World Championships (1886–1946)

- 1886–1892 / Wilhelm Steinitz (4-peat)
- 1894–1910 Emanuel Lasker (6-peat)
- 1927–1934 Alexander Alekhine
- 1948–1954 Mikhail Botvinnik
- 1975–1981 Anatoly Karpov
- 1985–1995 / Garry Kasparov (6-peat)
- 1993–1998 Anatoly Karpov

FIDE World Championships (2006–present)

- 2007–2012 Viswanathan Anand (4-peat)
- 2013–2021 Magnus Carlsen (5-peat)

==== Women's World Chess Championships ====
- 1927–1939 / Vera Menchik (9-peat)
- 1962–1975 Nona Gaprindashvili (5-peat)
- 1978–1988 Maia Chiburdanidze (5-peat; she tied her 1981 title match but retained the title according to the rules; otherwise it would be a three-peat (1984–1988))
- 2018–2025 Ju Wenjun (5-peat)

=== Competitive eating ===
==== Nathan's Hot Dog Eating Contest ====
===== Men =====
- 1988–1990 (United States) Jay Green (1990 tied with (United States) Mike DeVito)
- 1993–1994 (United States) Mike DeVito (1993 Independence Day, 1993 One-on-one Challenge with Japan, 1994 Independence Day)
- 1996–1998 Hirofumi Nakajima (1996 One-on-one Challenge with Japan, 1997 and 1998 Independence Day)
- 2001–2006 (Japan) Takeru Kobayashi (6-peat)
- 2007–2014 (United States) Joey Chestnut (8-peat)
- 2016–2023 (United States) Joey Chestnut (8-peat)

===== Women =====
- 2011–2013 (United States) Sonya Thomas
- 2014–2020 (United States) Miki Sudo (7-peat)

==== Nathan's Famous Lemonade Chug Contest ====
- 2021–2024 (United States) Eric "Badlands" Booker (4-peat)

=== Cricket ===
Cricket World Cup

- 1999–2007 Australia (ICC ODI World Cup every 4 years)

ICC Women's T20 World Cup

- 2010–2014 Australia
- 2018–2023 Australia

=== Cycling ===
Tour de France

General Classification

- 1953–1955 (France) Louison Bobet
- 1961–1964 (France) Jacques Anquetil (4-peat)
- 1969–1972 (Belgium) Eddy Merckx (4-peat)
- 1991–1995 (Spain) Miguel Induráin (5-peat)
- ~~1999–2005 (United States) Lance Armstrong (7-peat)~~ (stripped)

Points Classification

- 1996–2001 (Germany) Erik Zabel (6-peat)
- 2012–2016 (Slovakia) Peter Sagan (5-peat)

Mountains Classification

- 1962–1964 (Spain) Federico Bahamontes
- 1965–1967 (Spain) Julio Jiménez
- 1994–1997 (France) Richard Virenque (4-peat)

Young Rider Classification

- 1996–1998 (Germany) Jan Ullrich
- 2008–2010 (Luxembourg) Andy Schleck
- 2020–2023 (Slovenia) Tadej Pogačar (4-peat)

Team Classification

- 2004–2006 (Germany) T-Mobile Team
- 2018–2020 (Spain) Movistar Team

=== Darts ===
BDO World Darts Championship

- 1984–1986 (England) Eric Bristow
- 2017–2019 (England) Glen Durrant

PDC World Darts Championship

- 1995–2002 (England) Phil Taylor (8-peat)
- 2004–2006 (England) Phil Taylor

(Scotland) Gary Anderson could have made a three-peat in 2015–2017 but lost 7–3 to (Netherlands) Michael van Gerwen in the final of the 2017 World darts championship.

BDO Women's World Darts Championship

- 2001–2007 (England) Trina Gulliver (7-peat)

=== Esports ===
Counter Strike

- 2010–2011 (Ukraine) Natus Vincere (4-peat: Intel Extreme Masters 2010, ESWC 2010, WCG 2010, and Intel Extreme Masters 2011)

Counter Strike: Global Offensive

- 2018–2019 (Denmark) Astralis (FACEIT Major: London 2018, IEM Katowice Major 2019, StarLadder Major: Berlin 2019)

League of Legends

- 2023 – 2025 (South Korea) T1 (2023 League of Legends World Championship, 2024 League of Legends World Championship, 2025 League of Legends World Championship)

=== Futsal ===
FIFA Futsal World Cup

- 1989, 1992, 1996 / Brazil

UEFA Futsal Championship

- 2005, 2007, 2010, 2013 Spain (4-peat)

Intercontinental Futsal Cup

- 2005–2008, 2011 (Spain) Boomerang Interviú/Interviú Fadesa/Inter Movistar (5-peat)
- 2016, 2018–2019 (Brazil) Magnus Futsal

UEFA Futsal Champions League

- 2023–2025 (Spain) Palma Futsal

South American Futsal Championship / Copa Libertadores de Futsal

- 2004–2009 (Brazil) Jaraguá (6-peat)
- 2017–2019 (Brazil) Carlos Barbosa

=== Golf ===
==== US Open ====
- 1903–1905 (Scotland) Willie Anderson

==== The Open Championship ====
- 1868–1872 (Scotland) Young Tom Morris (4-peat)
- 1877–1879 (Scotland) Jamie Anderson
- 1880–1882 (Scotland) Bob Ferguson
- 1954–1956 (Australia) Peter Thomson

==== PGA Championship ====
- 1924–1927 (United States) Walter Hagen

=== Handball ===
National team competitions	Club competitions
Men IHF World Men's Handball Championship: 2019–2025 Denmark (4-peat); IHF World Men's Outdoor Handball Championship: 1952–1959 Germany; European Men's Handball Championship: 1998–2002 Sweden; African Championship: 1974–79 Tunisia; 1981–1989 Algeria (5-peat); 2020–2024 Egypt; Women; IHF World Women's Handball Championship: 1982–1990 Soviet Union; 2005–2009 Russia; European Women's Handball Championship: 2004–2010 Norway (4-peat)	Men IHF Super Globe: 2017–2019 (Spain) FC Barcelona Handbol; 2021–2023 (Germany) SC Magdeburg; EHF Champions League: 1995–2000 (Spain) FC Barcelona Handbol (5-peat); EHF European Cup: 2007–2009 (Romania) CS UCM Reşiţa; EHF Cup Winner's Cup: 1983–1986 (Spain) FC Barcelona Handbol; EHF Men's Champions Trophy: 1996–2000 (Spain) FC Barcelona Handbol (4-peat); African Champions League: 1979–1981 (Egypt) Zamalek; 1997–2000 (Algeria) MC Alger (4-peat); 2003–2006 (Algeria) MC Alger (4-peat); 2017–2019 (Egypt) Zamalek; African Cup Winners' Cup: 1991–1995 (Algeria) MC Alger (5-peat); 1997–1999 (Algeria) MC Alger; 2009–2011 (Egypt) Zamalek; African Super Cup: 1994–1999 (Algeria) MC Alger (6-peat); 2004–2006 (Algeria) MC Alger; 2010–2012 (Egypt) Zamalek; 2018–2021 (Egypt) Zamalek; 2022–2024 (Egypt) Al Ahly; SEHA League: 2017–2019 (North Macedonia) RK Vardar; 2020–2022 (Hungary) Veszprém KC; Women; Women's EHF Champions League: 1970–1973 (Soviet Union) Spartak Kyiv (4-peat); 1985–1988 (Soviet Union) Spartak Kyiv (4-peat); 1992–1995 (Austria) Hypo Niederösterreich (4-peat); 2017–2019 (Hungary) Győri Audi ETO KC; 2021–2023 (Norway) Vipers Kristiansand

=== Ice hockey ===
Canada Cup

- 1984, 1987, 1991 Canada

=== International rules football ===
International Rules Series

- 1990–1999 (1990, 1998, 1999)^{†} (Republic of Ireland) Ireland

^{†} International rules football games are held sporadically, hence the eight-year gap between 1990 and 1998.

=== Motorboat racing ===
Formula 1 Powerboat World Championship

- 1993–1996 (Italy) Guido Cappellini (4-peat)
- 2001–2003 (Italy) Guido Cappellini
- 2011–2013 (Italy) Alex Carella
- 2014–2016 (France) Philippe Chiappe

=== Motorcycling ===
MotoGP

- 1953–1955 (United Kingdom) Geoff Duke
- 1958–1960 (United Kingdom) John Surtees
- 1962–1965 (United Kingdom) Mike Hailwood (4-peat)
- 1966–1972 (Italy) Giacomo Agostini (7-peat)
- 1990–1992 (United States) Wayne Rainey
- 1994–1998 (Australia) Mick Doohan (5-peat)
- 2001–2005 (Italy) Valentino Rossi (5-peat)
- 2016–2019 (Spain) Marc Márquez (4-peat)

=== Motorsports ===
Formula One World Drivers' Champion

- 1954–1957 (Argentina) Juan Manuel Fangio (4-peat)
- 2000–2004 (Germany) Michael Schumacher (5-peat)
- 2010–2013 (Germany) Sebastian Vettel (4-peat)
- 2017–2020 (United Kingdom) Lewis Hamilton (4-peat)
- 2021–2024 (Netherlands) Max Verstappen (4-peat)

=== Rugby ===
==== Rugby Union ====
Women's Rugby World Cup

- 1998–2010 New Zealand (4-peat)

==== Rugby League ====
Rugby League World Cup

- 1975–2000 Australia (6-peat)
- 2013–2021 Australia

Women's Rugby League World Cup

- 2000–2008 New Zealand
- 2013–2021 Australia

=== Surfing ===
IPS World Circuit World Champion

- 1979–1982 (Australia) Mark Richards

ASP World Tour World Champion

- 1994–1998 (United States) Kelly Slater

ASP World Tour World Champion

- 2000–2002 (Hawaii) Andy Irons

=== Tennis ===
==== Davis Cup ====
- 1903–1906 (United Kingdom) British Isles
- 1907–1911 Australasia
- 1920–1926 United States
- 1927–1932 France
- 1933–1936 (United Kingdom) Great Britain
- 1946–1949 United States
- 1950–1953 Australia
- 1955–1957 Australia
- 1959–1962 Australia
- 1964–1967 Australia
- 1968–1972 United States

==== Fed Cup ====
- 1976–1982 United States
- 1983–1985 Czechoslovakia
- 1993–1995 Spain

==== Australian Open ====
===== Men's singles =====
- 1931–1933 (Australia) Jack Crawford
- 1963–1967 (Australia) Roy Emerson
- 2011–2013 (Serbia) Novak Djokovic
- 2019–2021 (Serbia) Novak Djokovic

===== Women's singles =====
- 1928–1930 (Australia) Daphne Akhurst Cozens
- 1946–1948 (Australia) Nancye Wynne Bolton
- 1960–1966 (Australia) Margaret Court (6-peat)
- 1969–1971 (Australia) Margaret Court
- 1974–1976 (Australia) Evonne Goolagong Cawley
- 1988–1990 (West Germany) Steffi Graf
- 1991–1993 (Socialist Federal Republic of Yugoslavia) (Federal Republic of Yugoslavia) Monica Seles
- 1997–1999 (Switzerland) Martina Hingis

===== Men's doubles =====
- 1936–1940 (Australia) Adrian Quist (5-peat; his partners were (Australia) Don Turnbull in 1936–37 tournaments, and (Australia) John Bromwich until 1940)
- 1938–1940 (Australia) John Bromwich (his partner was (Australia) Adrian Quist, see above)
- 1946–1950 (Australia) John Bromwich and (Australia) Adrian Quist (5-peat)
- 1959–1961 (Australia) Rod Laver and (Australia) Bob Mark
- 2009–2011 (United States) Mike Bryan and (United States) Bob Bryan

===== Women's doubles =====
- 1923–1925 (Australia) Sylvia Lance Harper (her partners were (Australia) Esna Boyd Robertson in the 1923 tournament, and (Australia) Daphne Akhurst Cozens in 1924–25)
- 1936–1940 (Australia) Thelma Coyne Long and (Australia) Nancye Wynne Bolton
- 1947–1949 (Australia) Thelma Coyne Long and (Australia) Nancye Wynne Bolton
- 1954–1956 (Australia) Mary Bevis Hawton (her partners were (Australia) Beryl Penrose in 1954–55, and Thelma Coyne Long in the 1956 tournament)
- 1961–1963 (Australia) Margaret Court (her partners were (Australia) Mary Carter Reitano in the 1961 tournament, and (Australia) Robyn Ebbern in 1962–63)
- 1969–1971 (Australia) Margaret Court (her partners were (Australia) Judy Tegart Dalton in 1969–70, and (Australia) Evonne Goolagong Cawley in the 1971 tournament)
- 1974–1976 (Australia) Evonne Goolagong Cawley (her partners were (United States) Peggy Michel in 1974–75, and (Australia) Helen Gourlay in the 1976 tournament)
- 1976–12/1977 (Australia) Helen Gourlay (her partners were (Australia) Evonne Goolagong Cawley in 1976 and December 1977 (see above), and (Australia) Dianne Fromholtz Balestrat in January 1977)
- 1982–1989 (United States) Martina Navratilova and (United States) Pam Shriver (7-peat)
- 1997–1999 (Switzerland) Martina Hingis (her partners were (Belarus) Natasha Zvereva in the 1997 tournament, (Croatia) Mirjana Lučić in 1998, and (Russia) Anna Kournikova in 1999)

==== French Open ====
===== Men's singles =====
- 1894–1896 (France) André Vacherot
- 1897–1900 (France) Paul Aymé
- 1907–1909 (France) Max Decugis
- 1912–1914 (France) Max Decugis
- 1978–1981 (Sweden) Björn Borg (4-peat)
- 2005–2008 (Spain) Rafael Nadal (4-peat)
- 2010–2014 (Spain) Rafael Nadal (5-peat)
- 2017–2020 (Spain) Rafael Nadal (4-peat)

===== Women's singles =====
- 1897–1899 (France) Adine Masson
- 1904–1906 (France) Kate Gillou
- 1909–1912 (France) Jeanne Matthey
- 1920–1923 (France) Suzanne Lenglen
- 1928–1930 (United States) Helen Wills
- 1935–1937 (Germany) Hilde Krahwinkel Sperling
- 1990–1992 (Socialist Federal Republic of Yugoslavia) (Federal Republic of Yugoslavia) Monica Seles
- 2005–2007 (Belgium) Justine Henin
- 2022–2024 (Poland) Iga Świątek

===== Men's doubles =====
- 1961–1965 (Australia) Roy Emerson (6-peat: his partners were (Australia) Neal Fraser in 1960 and 1962, (Australia) Rod Laver in the 1961 tournament, (Spain) Manuel Santana in 1963, (Australia) Ken Fletcher in 1964, and (Australia) Fred Stolle in 1965)

===== Women's doubles =====
- 1909–1912 (France) Jeanne Matthey and (France) Daisy Speranza
- 1920–1923 (France) Suzanne Lenglen (4-peat: her partners were (France) Elisabeth d'Aryen in the 1920 tournament, (France) Geramine Pigueron in 1921–22, and (France) Didi Vasto in 1923)
- 1932–1934 (United States) Elizabeth Ryan (her partners were (United States) Helen Wills in the 1932 tournament, and (France) Simonne Mathieu in 1933–34)
- 1936–1939 (France) Simonne Mathieu (4-peat: her partners were (United Kingdom) Billie Yorke in 1936–38, and (Poland) Jadwiga Jędrzejowska in the 1939 tournament)
- 1936–1938 (United Kingdom) Billie Yorke (her partner was (France) Simonne Mathieu, see above)
- 1950–1953 (United States) Doris Hart and (United States) Shirley Fry Irvin
- 1961–1963 (Union of South Africa) Renée Schuurman (her partners were (Union of South Africa) Sandra Reynolds in 1961–62, and (United Kingdom) Ann Jones in the 1963 tournament)
- 1964–1966 (Australia) Margaret Court (her partners were (Australia) Lesley Turner Bowrey in 1964–65, and (Australia) Judy Tegart in the 1966 tournament)
- 1967–1971 (France) Françoise Dürr (5-peat: her partners were (France) Gail Chanfreau in 1967 and 1970–71, and (United Kingdom) Ann Jones in 1967–68)
- 1984–1988 (United States) Martina Navratilova (5-peat: her partners were (United States) Pam Shriver in 1984–85 and 1987–88, and (Hungary) Andrea Temesvári in the 1986 tournament)
- 1991–1995 (United States) Gigi Fernández (5-peat: her partners were (Czechoslovakia) Jana Novotná in the 1991 tournament, and (Belarus) (Belarus) Natasha Zvereva in 1992–95)
- 1992–1995 (Belarus) (Belarus) Natasha Zvereva (4-peat: her partner was (United States) Gigi Fernández, see above)

==== Wimbledon ====
===== Gentlemen's singles =====
- 1881–1886 (United Kingdom) William Renshaw
- 1897–1900 (United Kingdom) Reginald Doherty
- 1902–1906 (United Kingdom) Laurence Doherty
- 1910–1913 (New Zealand) Anthony Wilding
- 1934–1936 (United Kingdom) Fred Perry
- 1976–1980 (Sweden) Björn Borg (5-peat)
- 1993–1995 (United States) Pete Sampras
- 1997–2000 (United States) Pete Sampras (4-peat)
- 2003–2007 (Switzerland) Roger Federer (5-peat)
- 2018–2022 (Serbia) Novak Djokovic (4-peat, as 2020 Wimbledon was cancelled due to COVID-19)

===== Ladies' singles =====
- 1891–1893 (United Kingdom) Lottie Dod
- 1919–1923 (France) Suzanne Lenglen
- 1927–1930 (United States) Helen Wills
- 1948–1950 (United States) Louise Brough
- 1952–1954 (United States) Maureen Connolly
- 1966–1968 (United States) Billie Jean King
- 1982–1987 (United States) Martina Navratilova (6-peat)
- 1991–1993 (Germany) Steffi Graf

===== Gentlemen's doubles =====
- 1884–1886 (United Kingdom) William Renshaw and (United Kingdom) Ernest Renshaw
- 1894–1896 (United Kingdom) Wilfred Baddeley and (United Kingdom) Herbert Baddeley
- 1897–1901 (United Kingdom) Laurence Doherty and (United Kingdom) Reginald Doherty
- 1903–1905 (United Kingdom) Laurence Doherty and (United Kingdom) Reginald Doherty
- 1921–22 (United Kingdom) Randolph Lycett (his partners were (United Kingdom) Max Woosnam in the 1921 tournament, (Australia) James Anderson in 1922, and (United Kingdom) Leslie Godfree)
- 1929–1931 (United States) John Van Ryn (his partners were (United States) Wilmer Allison in 1929–30, and (United States) George Lott in the 1931 tournament)
- 1968–1970 (Australia) John Newcombe and (Australia) Tony Roche
- 1993–1997 (Australia) Todd Woodbridge and (Australia) Mark Woodforde
- 2002–2004 (Australia) Todd Woodbridge and (Sweden) Jonas Björkman

===== Ladies' doubles =====
- 1919–1923 (France) Suzanne Lenglen and (United States) Elizabeth Ryan (5-peat)
- 1925–1927 (United States) Elizabeth Ryan (her partners were (France) Suzanne Lenglen in the 1925 tournament, (United States) Mary Browne in 1926, and (United States) Helen Wills in 1927)
- 1948–1950 (United States) Louise Brough and (United States) Margaret Osborne duPont
- 1951–1953 (United States) Shirley Fry Irvin and (United States) Doris Hart
- 1956–1958 (United States) Althea Gibson (her partners were (United Kingdom) Angela Buxton in the 1956 tournament, (United States) Darlene Hard in 1957, and (Brazil) Maria Bueno in 1958)
- 1970–1973 (United States) Billie Jean King (4-peat: her partners were (United States) Rosemary Casals in 1970–71 and 1973, and (Netherlands) Betty Stöve in the 1972 tournament)
- 1981–1984 (United States) Martina Navratilova and (United States) Pam Shriver (4-peat)
- 1991–1994 (Soviet Union) (Belarus) Natasha Zvereva (4-peat: her partners were (Soviet Union) Larisa Neiland in the 1991 tournament, and (United States) Gigi Fernández in 1992–94)
- 1992–1994 (United States) Gigi Fernández (her partner was (Belarus) Natasha Zvereva, see above)

==== US Open ====
===== Men's singles =====
- 1881–1887 (United States) Richard Sears
- 1890–1892 (United States) (United States) Oliver Campbell
- 1898–1900 (United States) Malcolm Whitman
- 1907–1911 (United States) (United States) William Larned
- 1920–1925 (United States) Bill Tilden
- 1979–1981 (United States) John McEnroe
- 1985–1987 (Czechoslovakia) Ivan Lendl
- 2004–2008 (Switzerland) Roger Federer (5-peat)

===== Women's singles =====
- 1909–1911 (United States) Hazel Hotchkiss Wightman
- 1912–1914 (United States) (United States) Mary Browne
- 1915–1918 (Norway) Molla Mallory
- 1920–1922 (United States) Molla Mallory
- 1923–1925 (United States) Helen Wills
- 1927–1929 (United States) Helen Wills
- 1932–1935 (United States) Helen Jacobs
- 1938–1940 (United States) Alice Marble
- 1943–1944 (United States) Pauline Betz
- 1948–1950 (United States) Margaret Osborne duPont
- 1951–1953 (United States) Maureen Connolly
- 1975–1978 (United States) Chris Evert (4-peat)
- 2012–2014 (United States) Serena Williams

===== Men's doubles =====
- 1882–1887 (United States) Richard Sears (6-peat: his partners were (United States) James Dwight in 1882–84 and 1886–87, and (United States) Joseph Clark in the 1885 tournament)
- 1882–1884 (United States) James Dwight (his partner was (United States) Richard Sears, see above)
- 1899–1901 (United States) Holcombe Ward and (United States) Dwight F. Davis
- 1904–1906 (United States) Holcombe Ward and (United States) Beals Wright
- 1907–1910 (United States) (United States) Fred Alexander and (United States) (United States) Harold Hackett (4-peat)
- 1912–1914 (United States) Maurice McLoughlin and (United States) Tom Bundy
- 1921–1923 (United States) Bill Tilden (his partners were (United States) Vincent Richards in 1921–22, and (Union of South Africa) Brian Norton in the 1923 tournament)
- 1928–1930 (United States) George Lott (his partners were (United States) John F. Hennessey in the 1928 tournament, and (United States) John Doeg in 1929–30)
- 2021–2023 (United States) Rajeev Ram and (United Kingdom) Joe Salisbury

===== Women's doubles =====
- 1894–1898 (United States) (United States) Juliette Atkinson (5-peat: her partners were (United States) Helen Hellwig in 1894–95, (United States) Elisabeth Moore in the 1896 tournament, and Kathleen Atkinson in 1897–98)
- 1909–1911 (United States) Hazel Hotchkiss Wightman (her partners were (United States) Edith Rotch in 1909–10, and Eleonora Sears in the 1911 tournament)
- 1912–1914 (United States) (United States) Mary K. Browne (her partners were (United States) Dorothy Green in the 1912 tournament, and (United States) Louise Riddell Williams in 1913–14)
- 1915–1917 (United States) Eleonora Sears (her partners were (United States) Hazel Hotchkiss Wightman in the 1915 tournament, and (Norway) Molla Mallory in 1916–17)
- 1918–1920 (United States) Marion Jessup and (United States) Eleanor Goss
- 1937–1941 (United States) Sarah Palfrey Cooke (5-peat: her partners were (United States) Alice Marble in 1937–40, and (United States) Margaret Osborne duPont in the 1941 tournament)
- 1937–1940 (United States) Alice Marble (4-peat: her partner was (United States) Sarah Palfrey Cooke, see above)
- 1941–1950 (United States) Margaret Osborne duPont (10-peat: her partners were (United States) Sarah Palfrey Cooke in the 1941 tournament (see above), and (United States) Louise Brough in 1942–50)
- 1942–1950 (United States) Louise Brough (9-peat: her partner was Margaret Osborne duPont, see above)
- 1951–1954 (United States) Shirley Fry Irvin and (United States) Doris Hart
- 1955–1957 (United States) Louise Brough and (United States) Margaret Osborne duPont
- 1958–1962 (United States) (United States) (United States) Darlene Hard (5-peat: her partners were (United States) (United States) Jeanne Arth in 1958–59, (Brazil) Maria Bueno in 1960 and 1962, and (Australia) Lesley Turner Bowrey in the 1961 tournament)
- 2002–2004 (Spain) Virginia Ruano Pascual and (Argentina) Paola Suárez

==== ATP World Tour Finals ====
===== Singles =====
- 1971–1973 (Romania) Ilie Năstase
- 1985–1987 (Czechoslovakia) Ivan Lendl
- 2012–2015 (Serbia) Novak Djokovic (4-peat)

===== Doubles =====
- 1978–1984 (United States) Peter Fleming and John McEnroe (7-peat)

==== WTA Finals ====
===== Singles =====
- 1983–1986 (United States) Martina Navratilova (4-peat)
- 1990–1992 (Socialist Federal Republic of Yugoslavia) (Federal Republic of Yugoslavia) Monica Seles
- 2012–2014 (United States) Serena Williams

==== Indian Wells Masters ====
===== Men's singles =====
- 2004–2006 (Switzerland) Roger Federer
- 2014–2016 (Serbia) Novak Djokovic

===== Men's doubles =====
- 1986–1988 (France) Guy Forget (his partners were (United States) Peter Fleming in the 1986 tournament, (France) Yannick Noah in 1987, and (West Germany) Boris Becker in 1988)
- 1988–1990 (West Germany) Boris Becker (his partners were (France) Guy Forget in 1988 and 1990, and (Switzerland) Jakob Hlasek in the 1989 tournament)

==== Miami Open ====
===== Men's singles =====
- 2001–2003 (United States) Andre Agassi
- 2014–2016 (Serbia) Novak Djokovic

===== Women's singles =====
- 1994–1996 (Germany) Steffi Graf
- 2002–2004 (United States) Serena Williams
- 2013–2015 (United States) Serena Williams

===== Men's doubles =====
- 1996–1998 (Australia) Todd Woodbridge and (Australia) Mark Woodforde
- 2010–2012 (India) Leander Paes (his partners were (Czech Republic) Lukáš Dlouhý in the 2010 tournament, (India) Mahesh Bhupathi in 2011, and (Czech Republic) Radek Štěpánek in 2012)

===== Women's doubles =====
- 1995–1997 (Spain) Arantxa Sánchez Vicario (her partners were (Czech Republic) Jana Novotná in 1995 and 1996, and (Belarus) Natasha Zvereva in the 1997 tournament)

==== Monte Carlo Masters ====
===== Men's singles =====
- 2005–2012 (Spain) Rafael Nadal (8-peat)
- 2016–2018 (Spain) Rafael Nadal

==== Italian Open ====
===== Men's singles =====
- 2005–2007 (Spain) Rafael Nadal

==== Paris Masters ====
===== Men's singles =====
- 2013–2015 (Serbia) Novak Djokovic

==== Dubai Championships ====
===== Men's singles =====
- 2003–2005 (Switzerland) Roger Federer
- 2009–2011 (Serbia) Novak Djokovic

==== Barcelona Open ====
===== Men's singles =====
- 2005–2009 (Spain) Rafael Nadal (5-peat)
- 2011–2013 (Spain) Rafael Nadal
- 2016–2018 (Spain) Rafael Nadal

==== Halle Open ====
===== Men's singles =====
- 2003–2006 (Switzerland) Roger Federer (4-peat)
- 2013–2015 (Switzerland) Roger Federer

==== China Open ====
===== Men's singles =====
- 2012–2015 (Serbia) Novak Djokovic (4-peat)

==== Swiss Indoors ====
===== Men's singles =====
- 2006–2008 (Switzerland) Roger Federer
- 2017–2019 (Switzerland) Roger Federer

=== Winter X Games ===
Winter X Games SuperPipe

- 2008–2013 (United States) Shaun White

== National Football League ==
In the National Football League (NFL), a Super Bowl championship three-peat has not been accomplished. Two-time defending Super Bowl champions who failed to three-peat include the Green Bay Packers (1968), Miami Dolphins (1974), Pittsburgh Steelers (twice: 1976, 1980), San Francisco 49ers (1990), Dallas Cowboys (1994), Denver Broncos (1999), New England Patriots (2005), and Kansas City Chiefs (2024). The first eight teams failed to return to the title game in the third season (indicated in parentheses), with the 1976 Steelers, 1990 49ers, and 1994 Cowboys losing their respective conference championships. The Chiefs succeeded in reaching Super Bowl LIX, but lost to the Philadelphia Eagles.

The Buffalo Bills went to 4 consecutive Super Bowls as the AFC champions from 1990 to 1993, which is a feat unmatched in NFL history; however, they lost in every appearance. The Miami Dolphins (1971–73), New England Patriots (2016–18), and Kansas City Chiefs (2022–24) have each won 3 consecutive Conference championships (and appeared in 3 straight Super Bowls) in their history.

In the early years of the NFL, decades before the introduction of either the term three-peat or the Super Bowl, the Packers won three consecutive NFL titles from 1929–31. This was achieved without playing any postseason playoff games, as the league title was determined at that time from the season standings. In addition, the Packers won the NFL championship in 1965, at a time when the rival NFL and AFL played separate exclusive championships. They then followed that 1965 championship with their first two Super Bowl victories in 1966 and 1967 (their Super Bowl berths were earned by winning both the 1966 NFL Championship Game and 1967 NFL Championship Game), thereby winning championships three years in a row.

== Related terms ==
There have been efforts to come up with a similarly clever name for the potential fourth consecutive championship in the year following a three-peat. Quat-row (from "quatro", the Spanish word for the number four) was trademarked by Lakers fan and graphic artist Jerry Leibowitz because he felt four-peat "didn't make any sense phonetically", though it's thus far failed to catch on and the latter continues to be the primary term. Since three-peat came into usage, however, only one team in major American sports has been able to achieve at least four in a row: Hendrick Motorsports with driver Jimmie Johnson, who won five NASCAR Cup Series championships in a row from 2006 to 2010. Johnson's streak has been accordingly described as a five-peat.

There are also terms for winning three trophies in the same season:

- Triple Crown and Grand Slam – various sports
- Treble (association football)

The trifecta (also known as a tricast, triactor or tierce) is a concept in gambling in which a bettor successfully guesses the win, place and show in a particular race.

Rather than three-peat, English-speaking people may instead talk of a hat trick of championships, or simply a three-in-a-row.
