= John Quenneville =

Canadian ice hockey player (born 1996)

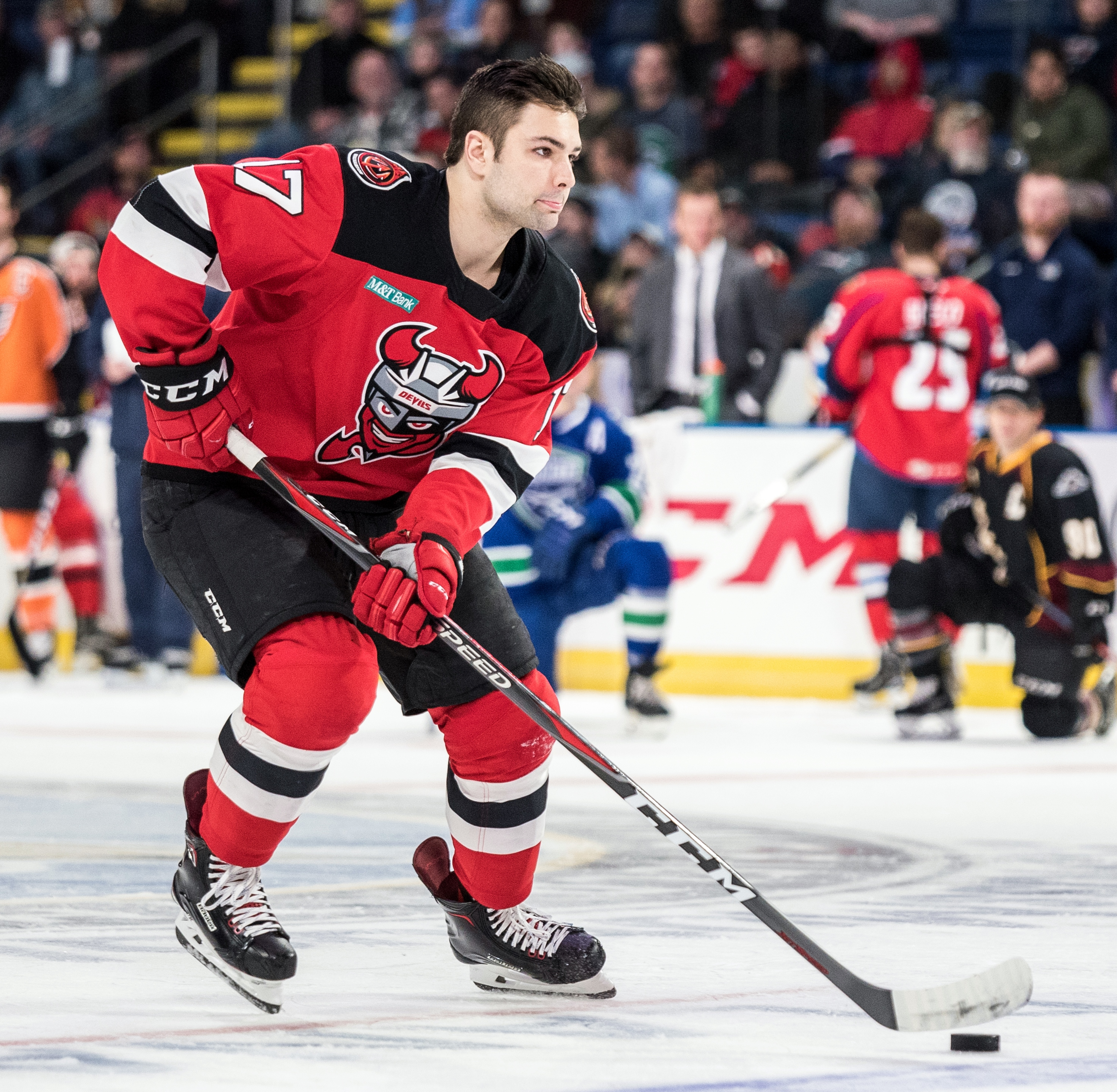
- Quenneville with the Binghamton Devils in 2019
- Born: April 16, 1996 (age 30) Edmonton, Alberta, Canada
- Height: 6 ft 1 in (185 cm)
- Weight: 195 lb (88 kg; 13 st 13 lb)
- Position: Centre
- Shot: Left
- Played for: New Jersey Devils; Chicago Blackhawks; ZSC Lions; Leksands IF; HC Lugano; Tappara
- NHL draft: 30th overall, 2014; New Jersey Devils
- Playing career: 2016–2025

John Quenneville (born April 16, 1996) is a Canadian former professional ice hockey player. Quenneville was selected by the New Jersey Devils in the first round (30th overall) of the 2014 NHL entry draft. Quenneville serves as an assistant coach for the Binghamton Black Bears of the FPHL.

== Playing career ==
=== Junior ===
Quenneville was selected by the Brandon Wheat Kings in the 3rd round (54th overall) of the 2011 WHL Bantam Draft. He played with the Brandon Wheat Kings from the 2012–13 WHL season to 2015–16 WHL season.

While playing with the Wheat Kings, Quenneville was rated as a top prospect who was viewed as a possible first round selection heading into the 2014 NHL entry draft. He was eventually drafted 30th overall by the New Jersey Devils in the 2014 NHL Entry Draft.

=== Professional ===
On July 13, 2015, Quenneville signed a three-year entry-level contract with the Devils, and after concluding his WHL career that season he subsequently joined the Albany Devils for the 2016–17 season. He made his NHL debut on December 1, 2016, against the Chicago Blackhawks. On January 5, 2017, Quennville was named to the 2017 AHL All-Star Classic, along with Joseph Blandisi. He was recalled to the NHL on March 15, 2017, and scored his first NHL goal in a 3–2 overtime win over the New York Rangers on March 21, 2017.

On June 22, 2019, Quenneville was traded to the Chicago Blackhawks in exchange for John Hayden. On June 28, the Blackhawks signed Quenneville to a two-year contract extension.

On July 21, 2021, Quenneville was selected from the Blackhawks at the 2021 NHL expansion draft by the Seattle Kraken. As a pending unrestricted free agent, Quenneville was not signed by the Kraken, and on August 10, 2021, he agreed to his first contract abroad in accepting a tryout arrangement with Swiss club, ZSC Lions of the National League (NL). Through making an initial positive impression, Quenneville converted his tryout into a one-year deal for the remainder of the 2021–22 season on September 5, 2021. He concluded his first European season, collected 20 goals and 37 points through 46 regular season games.

Remaining in Europe, Quenneville as a free agent secured a contract with Swedish top flight club, Leksands IF of the Swedish Hockey League (SHL), on July 15, 2022. In the following 2022–23 season, Quenneville was limited through injury however registered 12 points through 19 regular season games with Leksands before opting for a release to return to North America.

On February 2, 2023, Quenneville returned to the AHL by signing for the remainder of the season with the Belleville Senators, the primary affiliate of the Ottawa Senators. On December 12, Quenneville signed a one-year contract with HC Lugano of the Swiss National League. On November 9, 2024, Quenneville signed a season long contract to play with Tappara in the Finnish Liiga.

== International play ==
As a 16-year-old, Quenneville was chosen to compete with the Canada Pacific squad at the 2013 World U-17 Hockey Challenge, and he helped Team Canada capture the bronze medal at the 2014 IIHF World U18 Championships.

== Coaching career ==
On September 26, 2025 the Binghamton Black Bears announced Quenneville's hiring as an assistant coach for the upcoming season. Quenneville helped lead the franchise to its third straight Commissioner's Cup title as the Black Bears defeated the Pee Dee IceCats on May 9, 2026.

== Personal life ==
Quenneville's older brother Peter was drafted in the seventh round by the Columbus Blue Jackets in the 2013 NHL entry draft, and his younger brother David Quenneville was drafted 200th overall in the 2016 NHL entry draft by the New York Islanders. Former NHL player and head coach Joel Quenneville is his first cousin, once-removed. Former NHL defenseman Johnny Boychuk is his uncle by marriage.

== Career statistics ==
=== Regular season and playoffs ===
			Regular season					Playoffs
Season	Team	League	GP	G	A	Pts	PIM	GP	G	A	Pts	PIM
2011–12	Sherwood Park Crusaders	AJHL	9	0	3	3	0	2	2	0	2	0
2012–13	Brandon Wheat Kings	WHL	47	8	11	19	14	—	—	—	—	—
2013–14	Brandon Wheat Kings	WHL	61	25	33	58	71	9	5	8	13	10
2014–15	Brandon Wheat Kings	WHL	57	17	30	47	63	19	10	9	19	18
2015–16	Brandon Wheat Kings	WHL	57	31	42	73	71	21	16	11	27	8
2016–17	Albany Devils	AHL	58	14	32	46	53	4	3	1	4	4
2016–17	New Jersey Devils	NHL	12	1	3	4	2	—	—	—	—	—
2017–18	Binghamton Devils	AHL	43	14	20	34	45	—	—	—	—	—
2017–18	New Jersey Devils	NHL	2	0	0	0	0	—	—	—	—	—
2018–19	New Jersey Devils	NHL	19	1	0	1	4	—	—	—	—	—
2018–19	Binghamton Devils	AHL	37	18	21	39	41	—	—	—	—	—
2019–20	Rockford IceHogs	AHL	36	13	9	22	31	—	—	—	—	—
2019–20	Chicago Blackhawks	NHL	9	0	0	0	0	2	0	0	0	0
2020–21	Rockford IceHogs	AHL	16	1	1	2	23	—	—	—	—	—
2021–22	ZSC Lions	NL	46	20	17	37	57	2	0	1	1	0
2022–23	Leksands IF	SHL	19	5	7	12	12	—	—	—	—	—
2022–23	Belleville Senators	AHL	25	4	11	15	16	—	—	—	—	—
2023–24	HC Lugano	NL	20	2	8	10	16	2	0	2	2	31
2024–25	Tappara	Liiga	24	7	7	14	50	—	—	—	—	—
NHL totals			42	2	3	5	6	2	0	0	0	0

=== International ===
Year	Team	Event	Result	GP	G	A	Pts	PIM
2013	Canada Pacific	U17	2nd place, silver medalist(s)	4	0	0	0	0
2014	Canada	U18	3rd place, bronze medalist(s)	7	1	1	2	16
2016	Canada	WJC	6th	5	1	1	2	4
Junior totals				16	2	2	4	20

== Awards and honours ==
Honours	Year
AHL
AHL All-Star Classic	2017, 2019
International
World U-17 Hockey Challenge (Canada Pacific)	2013
IIHF World U18 Championship Bronze Medal	2014

Awards and achievements
Preceded by Stefan Matteau	New Jersey Devils first-round draft pick 2014	Succeeded by Pavel Zacha
