= Santa Ana Bulldogs =

Bulldogs FA
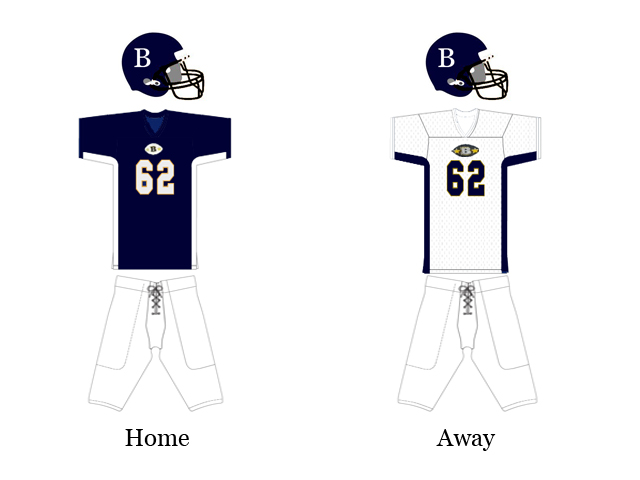
Uniforms

General information
- Founded: 2008
- Stadium: "Cuty" Monge Stadium (5,500 Spectators)
- Headquartered: San Jose, Costa Rica
- Colors: Blue, White and Yellow

Personnel
- Head coach: Carlos Ávila

League / conference affiliations
- Campeonato Nacional de Futbol Americano

Championships
- League championships: 0; 5 Costa Rica Super Bowls (II, III, IV, VI, VIII)

The Bulldogs FA, also known as the Dawgs, are a Costa Rican American football team based in San Jose, Costa Rica. They are currently members of FEFACR (American Football Federation of Costa Rica) for its acronym in Spanish. They are currently The Five-time champion on the league. The team, joined the FEFACR in 2008 being one of the league founders. The Dawgs earned their 5th Costa Rica Super Bowl.

== Uniform ==
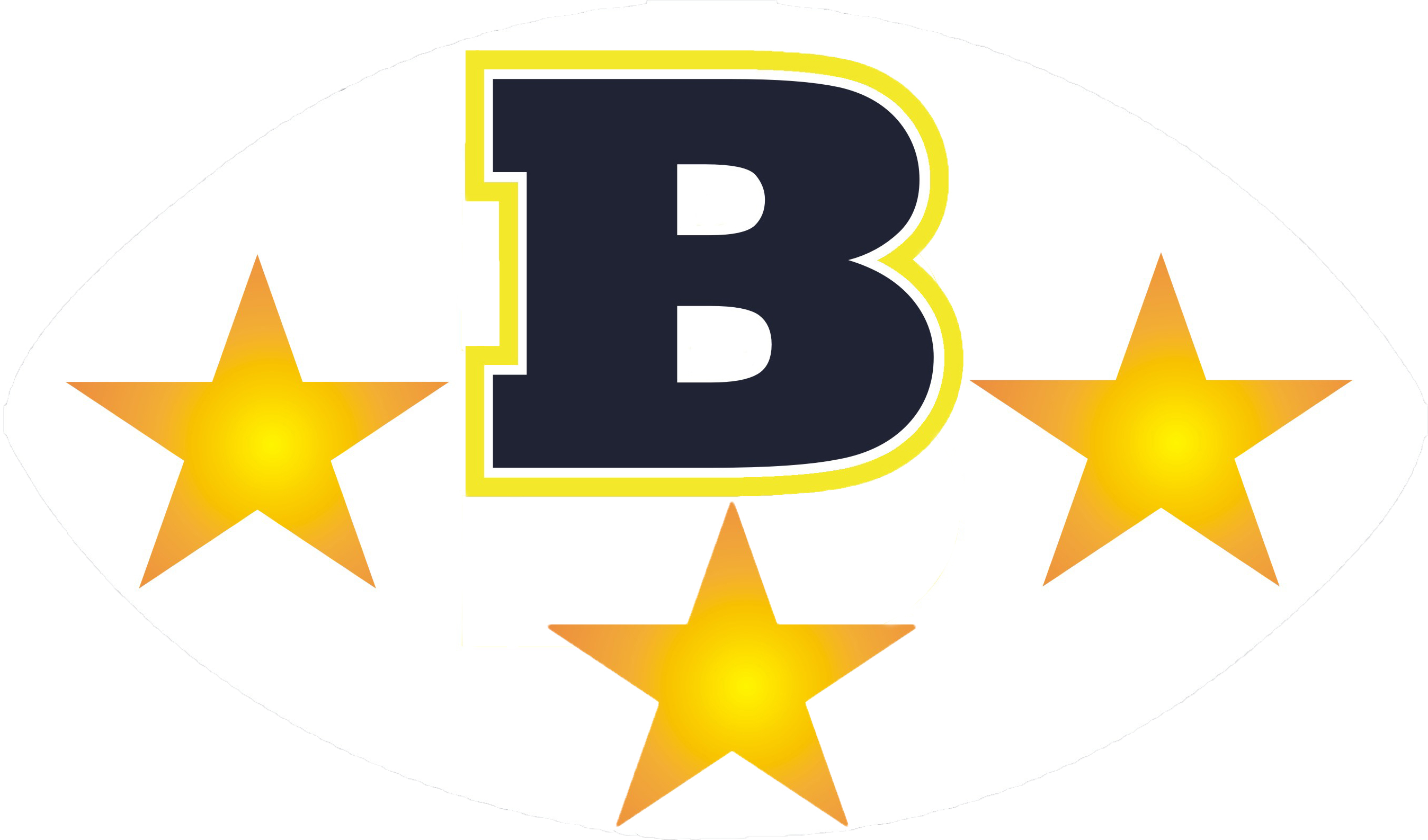
Home Uniform Logo

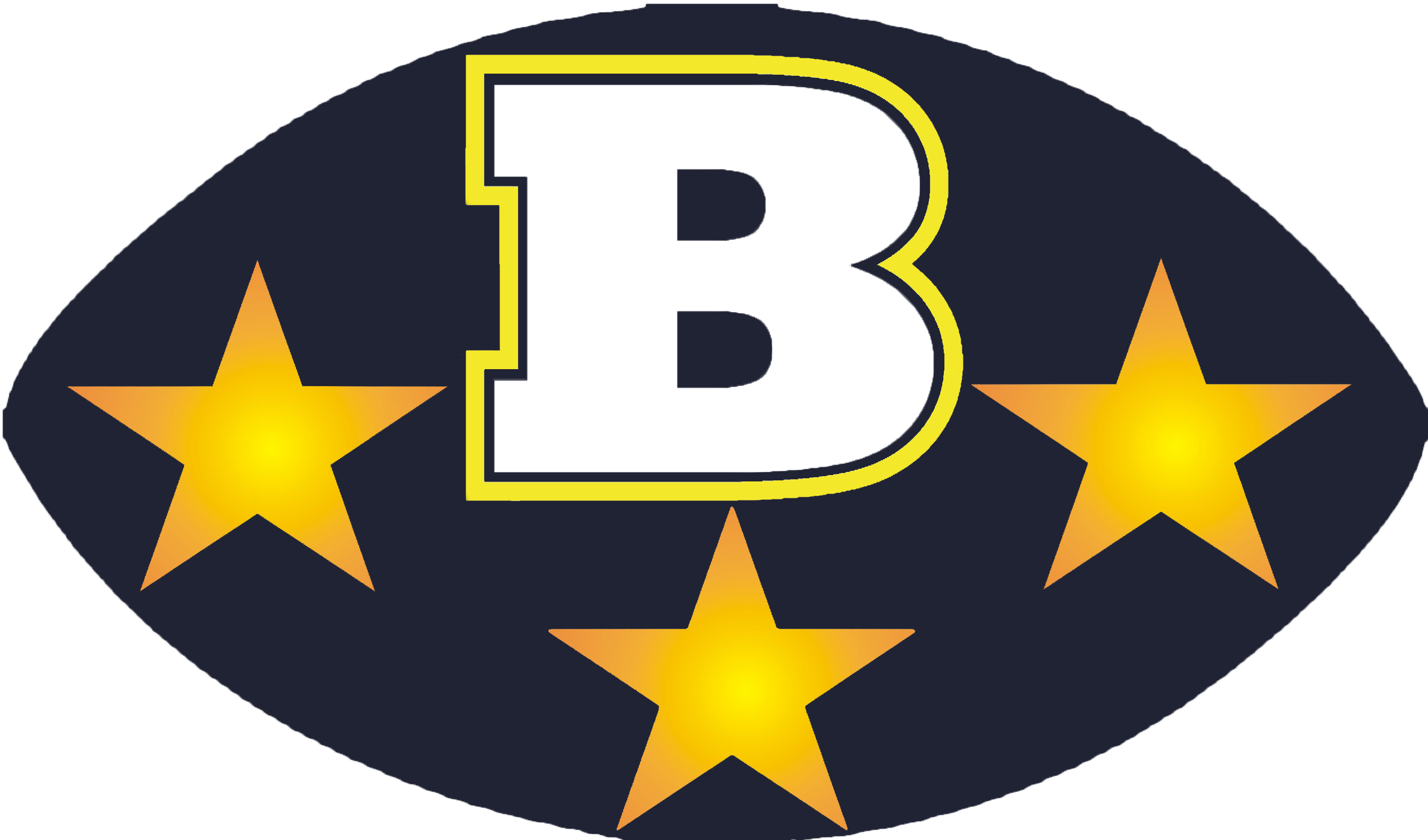
Away Uniform Logo

The Bulldogs wear two uniforms, their helmets are navy blue with a B on it, their home jersey is navy blue with white and gold numbers with white pants and navy blue socks.

For their away games, they usually wear their second uniform, which consists on the same navy blue helmet, but with a whole white uniform, with navy blue and gold numbers and navy blue socks.

== Coaching staff ==
- Head coach: Carlos Avila
- Linemen Coach: Gilbert Chávez
- Defensive Coordinator: Paco Wilson
- Defensive Assistant Coach: Danny Monney
- Special Teams Coach: Cisco León

== Mascot ==
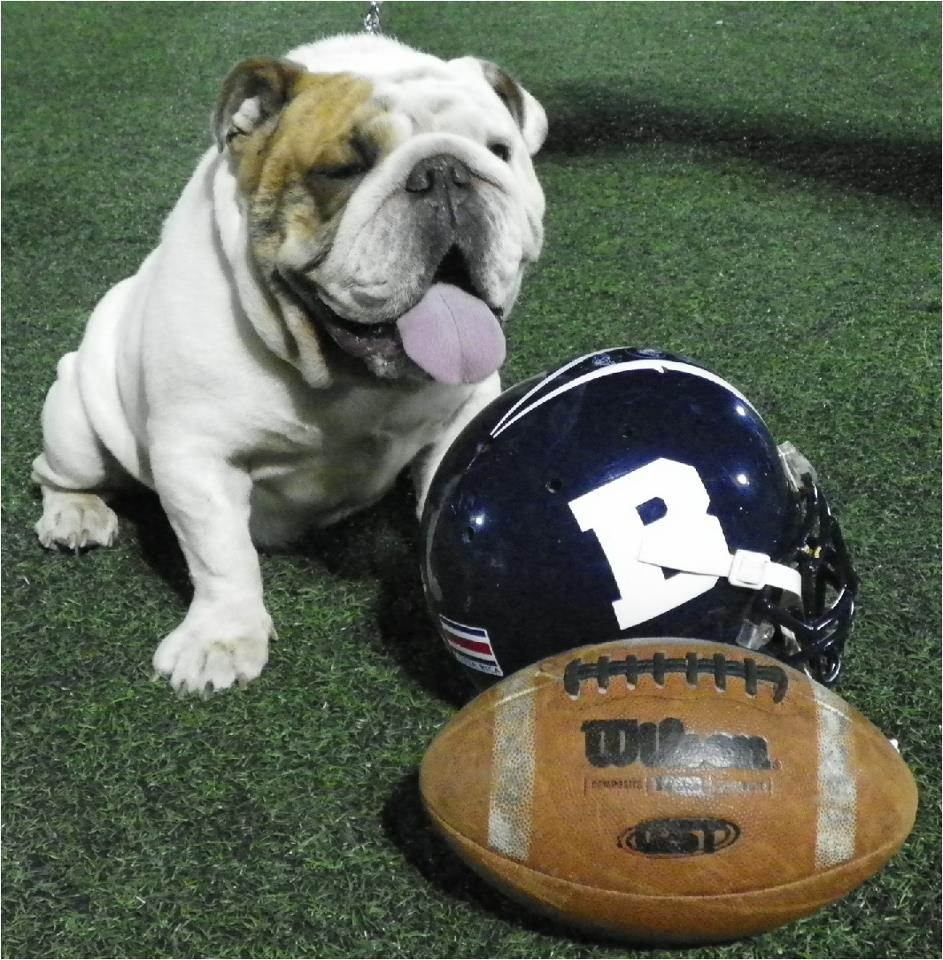
Big Papi II

As the team name, their mascot is a bulldog more often known as "Big Papi II". A true bulldog that goes into the field with the team in every game.

Big Papi II is an original Bulldog, it has accompanied the team since the beginning of the Costa Rican Football League.

== Regular season stats ==
Official FEFACR Stats

2012 Season
Unique Group
Team	Wins	Losses	Pct	PF	PA	Net Points
Bulldogs	8	0	1.000	280	73	207
Toros	5	3	0.625	273	122	151
Raptors	4	4	0.500	227	112	115
Rhynos	3	5	0.375	207	283	-76
Dragons	0	8	0.000	22	419	-397

2011 Season
Group A
Team	Wins	Losses	Pct	PF	PA	Net Points
Bulldogs	7	1	0.875	272	88	184
Tiburones	3	4	0.428	156	145	11
Dragons	0	7	0.000	33	297	-264
Group B
Team	Wins	Losses	Pct	PF	PA	Net Points
Toros	7	1	0.875	337	123	214
Raptors	4	3	0.571	277	136	141
Rhynos	1	6	0.142	52	358	-306

2010 Season
Unique Group
Team	Wins	Losses	Pct	PF	PA	Net Points
Bulldogs	10	0	1.000	342	104	238
Toros	7	3	0.700	354	236	118
Raptors	3	6	0.333	224	278	-44
Tiburones	3	6	0.333	105	200	-95
Dragons	0	8	0.000	21	248	-227

2009 Season
Unique Group
Team	Wins	Losses	Pct	PF	PA	Net Points
Toros	9	0	1.000	428	56	372
Tiburones	7	2	0.375	167	109	58
Dragons	3	5	0.375	129	155	-26
Bulldogs	3	5	0.375	100	187	-87
Black Gators	1	6	0.142	63	230	-167
Mustangs	1	6	0.142	63	213	-150

== Costa Rica Super Bowl Championships ==
The Bulldogs have won the last 3 Super Bowls, being the first American Football Team in Costa Rica to reach that record.

Year	Coach	Final Score	MVP
2010	Jose Lopez	Bulldogs 35 - 33 Toros*	Reinhard Weiss
2011	Jose Lopez	Bulldogs 35 - 17 Toros	Dean Mooke
2012	Jose Lopez	Bulldogs 30 - 07 Toros*	Benjamin Chaverri

*2010 Season, the team went undefeated(11-0)

**2012 Season, the team went undefeated(9-0)

== Bulldogs International Games ==
The Bulldogs have played against international teams representing their Country Costa Rica

Date	Coach	Home team	Final Score	Away team	Field	Location
June 2010	Jose Lopez	(Costa Rica) Bulldogs	19 - 13 (OT)	(Nicaragua) Guerreros	Cuty Monge Stadium	San Jose (Costa Rica)
May 2012	Jose Lopez	(Costa Rica) Bulldogs	6 - 14	(Panama) Saints	Perez Zeledon Sports Center	Pérez Zeledón (Costa Rica)

== Records ==
- Longest Winning Streak : 14 Games (From Game 4 Season 2011 to IV Costa Rica Super Bowl 2012)
- Longest Losing Streak : 3 Games (From Game 6 Season 2009 to Semifinal Game 2009)
- Most Points Scored on a Game : 70 Points (Game 4 Season 2012 / Bulldogs 70 - 8 Dragons)
- Most Points Granted on a Game : 54 Points (Semifinal Game 2009 / Toros 54 - 0 Bulldogs)
- Biggest Winning Difference : 62 Points (Game 4 Season 2012 / Bulldogs 70 - 8 Dragons)
- Smallest Winning Difference : 1 Point (Game 5 Season 2009 / Bulldogs 9 - 8 Dragons)
- Biggest Losing Difference : 54 Points (Semifinal Game 2009 / Toros 54 - 0 Bulldogs)
- Smallest Losing Difference : 13 Points (Game 1 Season 2009 / Bulldogs 6 - 19 Dragons)
- Longest Game Played : II Costa Rica Super Bowl (Toros 36 - 39 Bulldogs 3(OT))
- Shortest Game Played: Game 2 Season 2010 (Tiburones 0 - Bulldogs 17 / The game was called off at the 28th minute due to a misconduct of the whole Tiburones Team)

== Roster ==
Bulldogs FA
Quarterbacks: 15 Gabriel Mena; 12 Raul Aviles; 3 Arturo Ogiste; Running backs: 32 Reinhard Weiss (C); 33 Jose Leiton; 34 Manuel Loria; 44 Jeffry Herrera; Wide receivers: 13 Benjamin Chaverri; 16 Derrick Fadell; 22 Stefano Incer; 81 Luis Aguilar; 83 Luis Miguel Rivera; Tight ends: 88 Jorge Luis Porras; 80 Jason Jenkins	Offensive linemen: 50 Maikel Hernandez; 60 Carlos Avila (C); 61 Diego Peña; 63 Francisco Leon; 65 Warner Johnson; 71 Jeffrey Alfaro; 73 Rolando Alpizar; 74 Christopher Navarro; 75 Rodrigo Mora; 78 Jose Miguel Mora; 84 Robert Brooker; Defensive linemen: 52 Carlos Barberena; 54 Daniel Barberena; 66 Josue Ugalde; 69 Christian Sanchez; 70 Felipe "Yipi" Gonzalez; 76 Alex Calvo; 77 Jairo Sandoval; 82 Juan Pablo Herrera; 91 Ricardo Corrales; 95 Daniel Vindas; 98 Alonso Chavarría; 99 Roberto Fields	Linebackers: 2 David Munoz; 23 Eduardo Duran; 30 Dean Mooke (C); 43 Randall Orellana; 53 Johan Martinez; 55 Jose "Chingy" Gomez; 56 Danny Monney; 58 Nick Derion (C); 33 Danny Herrera; 2 David Munoz; Defensive backs: 8 Egebert Emile; 9 Ray Rodriguez; 14 Fabio Barrantes; 85 Kevin Ocampo; 87 Jean Karlo Vera; 89 Darriken Gordon; Special teams: 25 Eloy Chacon (Kicker)
