= Sprint hurdles at the World Athletics Championships =

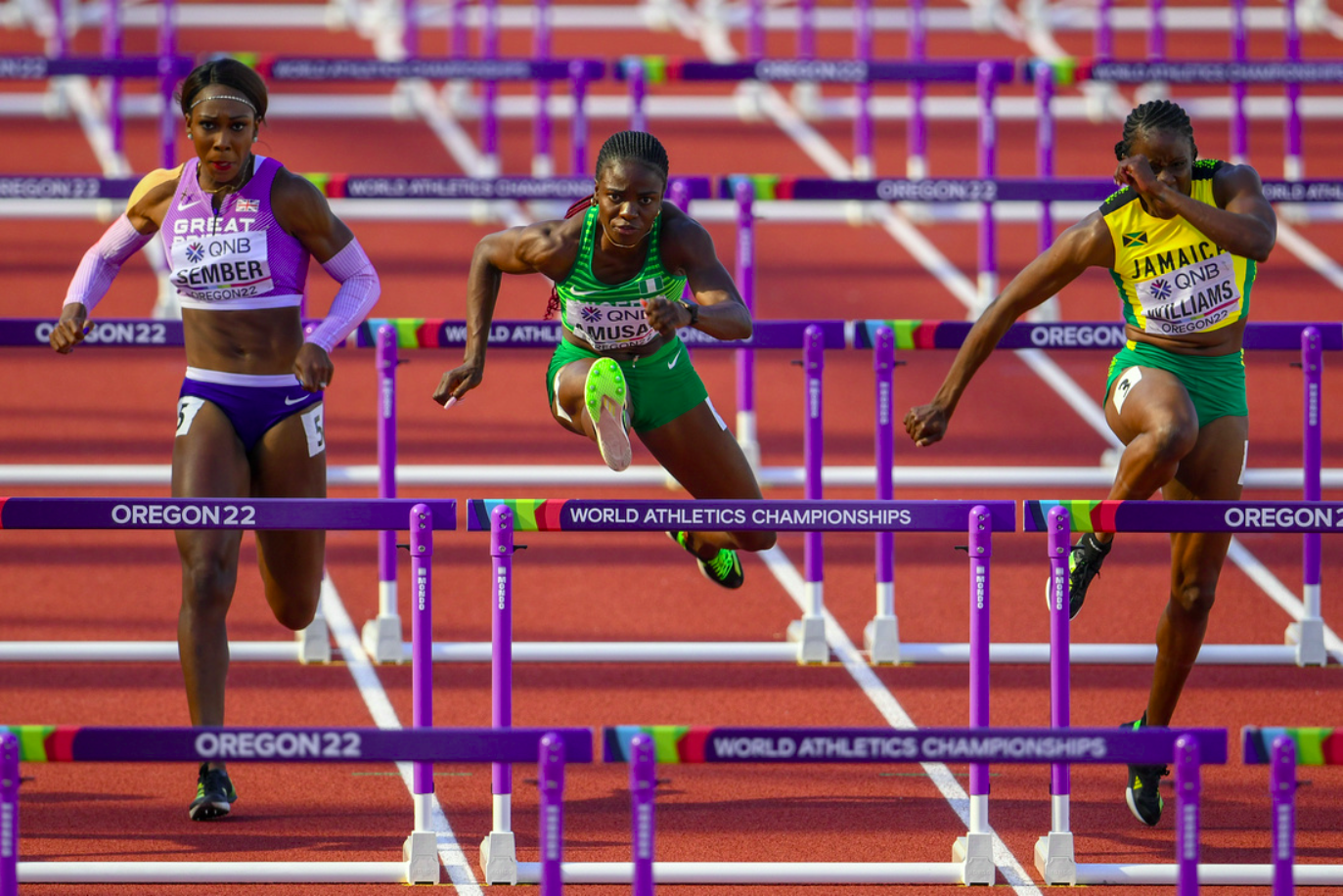
- Cindy Sember, Tobi Amusan and Danielle Williams competing at the 2022 championships

Overview
- Gender: Men and women
- Years held: Men: 1983 – 2025; Women: 1983 – 2025

Championship record
- Men: 12.91 Colin Jackson (1993)
- Women: 12.12 Tobi Amusan (2022)

Reigning champion
- Men: Cordell Tinch (USA)
- Women: Ditaji Kambundji (SUI)

The sprint hurdles at the World Championships in Athletics has been contested by both men and women since the inaugural edition of the championships in 1983. Traditionally, the men compete in the 110 metres hurdles while the women compete in the 100 metres hurdles.

Allen Johnson is the most successful athlete in the history of the event, winning 4 gold and 1 bronze medal between 1995 and 2003. The most successful female athlete is Gail Devers, winning 3 golds and 2 silvers between 1991 and 2001. The only other athletes who have won more than 3 medals are Liu Xiang and Sergey Shubenkov, both winning 1 gold, 2 silvers and 1 bronze between 2003 and 2011 and 2013 and 2019, respectively.

The United States is the most successful nation in the discipline, winning 20 gold medals in total: 12 in the men's event and 8 in the women's event. They have also won the most medals overall, with 44 medals total across both events. Jamaica is the only country other than the United States that has won a gold medal in both the men's and women's event, having won 14 medals in total, including 4 golds.

Great Britain has also seen significant success in the men's event, winning 2 gold, 4 silver and 3 bronze medals over the years. They have been less successful in the women's event, having won only one medal, a bronze in 2013.

The championship records for the event are 12.91 for men, set by Colin Jackson in 1993, and 12.12 s for women, set by Tobi Amusan in 2022. Coincidentally, these championships records are also the only two times that the world record has been broken at the World Championships. Additionally, Amusan ran a wind-aided 12.06 (+2.5 m/s) in the 2022 final.

The reiging world champions are Cordell Tinch of the United States and Ditaji Kambundji of Switzerland.

== Age records ==
- All information from World Athletics.

Distinction	Male			Female		
Distinction	Athlete	Age	Date	Athlete	Age	Date
Youngest champion	Ryan Brathwaite (BAR)	21 years, 75 days	20 Aug 2009	Brianna Rollins (USA)	21 years, 364 days	17 Aug 2013
Youngest medalist	Liu Xiang (CHN)	20 years, 48 days	30 Aug 2003	Britany Anderson (JAM)	21 years, 174 days	24 Jul 2022
Youngest finalist	Shi Dongpeng (CHN)	19 years, 236 days	30 Aug 2003	LaVonna Martin (USA)	20 years, 290 days	4 Sep 1987
Youngest participant	Liu Xiang (CHN)	18 years, 25 days	7 Aug 2001	Manuela Bosco (FIN)	17 years, 75 days	25 Aug 1999
Oldest champion	Greg Foster (USA)	33 years, 25 days	29 Aug 1991	Brigitte Foster-Hylton (JAM)	34 years, 285 days	19 Aug 2009
Oldest medalist	Allen Johnson (USA)	34 years, 164 days	12 Aug 2005	Ludmila Engquist (SWE)	35 years, 129 days	28 Aug 1999
Oldest finalist	Tony Dees (USA)	36 years, 19 days	25 Aug 1999	Patricia Girard (FRA)	35 years, 141 days	27 Aug 2003
Oldest participant	Petr Svoboda (CZE)	37 years, 279 days	16 Jul 2022	Irina Lenskiy (ISR)	38 years, 68 days	19 Aug 2009

== Medalists ==
=== Men ===
Championships	Gold	Silver	Bronze
1983 Helsinki	Greg Foster (USA)	Arto Bryggare (FIN)	Willie Gault (USA)
1987 Rome	Greg Foster (USA)	Jon Ridgeon (GBR)	Colin Jackson (GBR)
1991 Tokyo	Greg Foster (USA)	Jack Pierce (USA)	Tony Jarrett (GBR)
1993 Stuttgart	Colin Jackson (GBR)	Tony Jarrett (GBR)	Jack Pierce (USA)
1995 Gothenburg	Allen Johnson (USA)	Tony Jarrett (GBR)	Roger Kingdom (USA)
1997 Athens	Allen Johnson (USA)	Colin Jackson (GBR)	Igor Kováč (SVK)
1999 Seville	Colin Jackson (GBR)	Anier García (CUB)	Duane Ross (USA)
2001 Edmonton	Allen Johnson (USA)	Anier García (CUB)	Dudley Dorival (HAI)
2003 Saint-Denis	Allen Johnson (USA)	Terrence Trammell (USA)	Liu Xiang (CHN)
2005 Helsinki	Ladji Doucouré (FRA)	Liu Xiang (CHN)	Allen Johnson (USA)
2007 Osaka	Liu Xiang (CHN)	Terrence Trammell (USA)	David Payne (USA)
2009 Berlin	Ryan Brathwaite (BAR)	Terrence Trammell (USA)	David Payne (USA)
2011 Daegu	Jason Richardson (USA)	Liu Xiang (CHN)	Andy Turner (GBR)
2013 Moscow	David Oliver (USA)	Ryan Wilson (USA)	Sergey Shubenkov (RUS)
2015 Beijing	Sergey Shubenkov (RUS)	Hansle Parchment (JAM)	Aries Merritt (USA)
2017 London	Omar McLeod (JAM)	Sergey Shubenkov (ANA)	Balázs Baji (HUN)
2019 Doha	Grant Holloway (USA)	Sergey Shubenkov (ANA)	Pascal Martinot-Lagarde (FRA) Orlando Ortega (ESP)
2022 Eugene	Grant Holloway (USA)	Trey Cunningham (USA)	Asier Martínez (ESP)
2023 Budapest	Grant Holloway (USA)	Hansle Parchment (JAM)	Daniel Roberts (USA)
2025 Tokyo	Cordell Tinch (USA)	Orlando Bennett (JAM)	Tyler Mason (JAM)

==== Medal table ====
Rank	Nation	Gold	Silver	Bronze	Total
1	United States (USA)	13	6	9	28
2	Great Britain (GBR)	2	4	3	9
3	Jamaica (JAM)	1	3	1	5
4	China (CHN)	1	2	1	4
5	France (FRA)	1	0	1	2
5	Russia (RUS)	1	0	1	2
7	Barbados (BRB)	1	0	0	1
8	Cuba (CUB)	0	2	0	2
–	Authorised Neutral Athletes (ANA)	0	2	0	2
9	Finland (FIN)	0	1	0	1
10	Spain (ESP)	0	0	2	2
11	Haiti (HAI)	0	0	1	1
11	Hungary (HUN)	0	0	1	1
11	Slovakia (SVK)	0	0	1	1
Totals (13 entries)		20	20	21	61

==== Multiple medalists ====
Rank	Athlete	Nation	Period	Gold	Silver	Bronze	Total
1	Allen Johnson	1995-2003	United States (USA)	4	0	1	5
2	Greg Foster	1983-1991	United States (USA)	3	0	0	3
2	Grant Holloway	2019-2023	United States (USA)	3	0	0	3
4	Colin Jackson	1987-1999	Great Britain (GBR)	2	1	0	3
5	Liu Xiang	2003-2011	China	1	2	1	4
5	Sergey Shubenkov	2013-2019	Russia; Authorised Neutral Athletes	1	2	1	4
7	Terrence Trammell	2003-2009	United States (USA)	0	3	0	3
8	Tony Jarrett	1991-1995	Great Britain (GBR)	0	2	1	3
9	Anier García	1999-2001	Cuba	0	2	0	2
9	Hansle Parchment	2015-2023	Jamaica (JAM)	0	2	0	2
11	Jack Pierce	1991-1993	United States (USA)	0	1	1	2
12	David Payne	2007-2009	United States (USA)	0	0	2	2

=== Women ===
Championships	Gold	Silver	Bronze
1983 Helsinki	Bettine Jahn (GDR)	Kerstin Knabe (GDR)	Ginka Zagorcheva (BUL)
1987 Rome	Ginka Zagorcheva (BUL)	Gloria Uibel (GDR)	Cornelia Oschkenat (GDR)
1991 Tokyo	Ludmila Narozhilenko (URS)	Gail Devers (USA)	Nataliya Grygoryeva (URS)
1993 Stuttgart	Gail Devers (USA)	Marina Azyabina (RUS)	Lynda Tolbert-Goode (USA)
1995 Gothenburg	Gail Devers (USA)	Olga Shishigina (KAZ)	Yuliya Graudyn (RUS)
1997 Athens	Ludmila Engquist (SWE)	Svetla Dimitrova (BUL)	Michelle Freeman (JAM)
1999 Seville	Gail Devers (USA)	Glory Alozie (NGR)	Ludmila Engquist (SWE)
2001 Edmonton	Anjanette Kirkland (USA)	Gail Devers (USA)	Olga Shishigina (KAZ)
2003 Saint-Denis	Perdita Felicien (CAN)	Brigitte Foster-Hylton (JAM)	Miesha McKelvy (USA)
2005 Helsinki	Michelle Perry (USA)	Delloreen Ennis-London (JAM)	Brigitte Foster-Hylton (JAM)
2007 Osaka	Michelle Perry (USA)	Perdita Felicien (CAN)	Delloreen Ennis-London (JAM)
2009 Berlin	Brigitte Foster-Hylton (JAM)	Priscilla Lopes-Schliep (CAN)	Delloreen Ennis-London (JAM)
2011 Daegu	Sally Pearson (AUS)	Danielle Carruthers (USA)	Dawn Harper (USA)
2013 Moscow	Brianna Rollins (USA)	Sally Pearson (AUS)	Tiffany Porter (GBR)
2015 Beijing	Danielle Williams (JAM)	Cindy Roleder (GER)	Alina Talay (BLR)
2017 London	Sally Pearson (AUS)	Dawn Harper-Nelson (USA)	Pamela Dutkiewicz (GER)
2019 Doha	Nia Ali (USA)	Kendra Harrison (USA)	Danielle Williams (JAM)
2022 Eugene	Tobi Amusan (NGR)	Britany Anderson (JAM)	Jasmine Camacho-Quinn (PUR)
2023 Budapest	Danielle Williams (JAM)	Jasmine Camacho-Quinn (PUR)	Kendra Harrison (USA)
2025 Tokyo	Ditaji Kambundji (CHE)	Tobi Amusan (NGR)	Grace Stark (USA)

==== Medal table ====
Rank	Nation	Gold	Silver	Bronze	Total
1	United States (USA)	8	5	5	18
2	Jamaica (JAM)	3	3	5	11
3	Australia (AUS)	2	1	0	3
4	East Germany (GDR)	1	2	1	4
5	Canada (CAN)	1	2	0	3
5	Nigeria (NGR)	1	2	0	3
7	Bulgaria (BUL)	1	1	1	3
8	Soviet Union (URS)	1	0	1	2
8	Sweden (SWE)	1	0	1	2
10	Switzerland (SUI)	1	0	0	1
11	Germany (GER)	0	1	1	2
11	Kazakhstan (KAZ)	0	1	1	2
11	Puerto Rico (PUR)	0	1	1	2
11	Russia (RUS)	0	1	1	2
15	Belarus (BLR)	0	0	1	1
15	Great Britain (GBR)	0	0	1	1
Totals (16 entries)		20	20	20	60

==== Multiple medalists ====
Rank	Athlete	Nation	Period	Gold	Silver	Bronze	Total
1	Gail Devers	United States (USA)	1991-2001	3	2	0	5
2	Sally Pearson	Australia (AUS)	2011-2017	2	1	0	3
3	Danielle Williams	Jamaica (JAM)	2015-2023	2	0	1	3
3	Ludmila Narozhilenko / Engquist	Soviet Union (URS); Sweden (SWE)	1991-1999	2	0	1	3
5	Michelle Perry	United States (USA)	2005-2007	2	0	0	2
6	Brigitte Foster-Hylton	Jamaica (JAM)	2003-2009	1	1	1	3
7	Perdita Felicien	Canada (CAN)	2003-2007	1	1	0	2
7	Tobi Amusan	Nigeria (NGR)	2022-2025	1	1	0	2
8	Ginka Zagorcheva	Bulgaria (BUL)	1983-1987	1	0	1	2
9	Delloreen Ennis-London	Jamaica (JAM)	2005-2009	0	1	2	3
10	Olga Shishigina	Kazakhstan (KAZ)	1995-2001	0	1	1	2
10	Dawn Harper-Nelson	United States (USA)	2011-2017	0	1	1	2
10	Kendra Harrison	United States (USA)	2019-2023	0	1	1	2
10	Jasmine Camacho-Quinn	Puerto Rico	2022-2023	0	1	1	2

== Championship record progression ==
=== Men ===
Men's 110 metres hurdles World Championships record progression
Time	Athlete	Nation	Year	Round	Date
13.53	Mark McKoy	Canada	1983	Heats	1983-08-11
13.44	Arto Bryggare	Finland	1983	Heats	1983-08-11
13.41	Greg Foster	United States (USA)	1983	Heats	1983-08-11
13.22	Greg Foster	United States (USA)	1983	Semi-finals	1983-08-12
13.20	Greg Foster	United States (USA)	1987	Heats	1987-09-01
13.06	Greg Foster	United States (USA)	1991	Final	1991-08-29
13.06	Jack Pierce	United States (USA)	1991	Final	1991-08-29
12.91 WR	Colin Jackson	Great Britain (GBR)	1993	Final	1993-08-20

=== Women ===
Women's 100 metres hurdles World Championships record progression
Time	Athlete	Nation	Year	Round	Date
13.03	Kerstin Knabe	East Germany (GDR)	1983	Heats	1983-08-12
12.81	Bettine Jahn	East Germany (GDR)	1983	Heats	1983-08-12
12.75	Bettine Jahn	East Germany (GDR)	1983	Heats	1983-08-12
12.75	Ginka Zagorcheva	Bulgaria (BUL)	1983	Semi-finals	1983-08-13
12.51	Ginka Zagorcheva	Bulgaria (BUL)	1987	Heats	1987-09-03
12.34	Ginka Zagorcheva	Bulgaria (BUL)	1987	Final	1987-09-04
12.28	Sally Pearson	Australia	2011	Final	2011-09-03
12.12 WR	Tobi Amusan	Nigeria	2022	Final	2022-07-22

== Finishing times ==
=== Top ten fastest World Championship times ===
Fastest men's times at the World Championships
Rank	Time (sec)	Athlete	Nation	Year	Date
1	12.91	Colin Jackson	Great Britain	1993	1993-08-20
2	12.93	Allen Johnson	United States	1997	1997-08-07
3	12.95	Liu Xiang	China	2007	2007-08-31
4	12.96	Grant Holloway	United States	2023	2023-08-21
5	12.98	Sergey Shubenkov	Russia	2015	2015-08-28
6	12.99	Terrence Trammell	United States	2007	2007-08-31
6	12.99	Cordell Tinch	United States	2025	2025-09-16
8	13.00	Tony Jarrett	Great Britain	1993	1993-08-20
8	13.00	Allen Johnson	United States	1995	1995-08-12
8	13.00	David Oliver	United States	2013	2013-08-12

Fastest women's times at the World Championships^{1}
Rank	Time (sec)	Athlete	Nation	Year	Date
1	12.12	Tobi Amusan	Nigeria	2022^{SF}	2022-07-24
2	12.24	Kendra Harrison	United States	2023^{H}	2023-08-22
2	12.24	Ditaji Kambundji	Switzerland	2025	2025-09-16
4	12.27	Kendra Harrison	United States	2022^{SF}	2022-07-24
5	12.28	Sally Pearson	Australia	2011	2011-09-03
6	12.29	Tobi Amusan	Nigeria	2025	2025-09-16
7	12.31	Britany Anderson	Jamaica	2022^{SF}	2022-07-24
8	12.32	Jasmine Camacho-Quinn	Puerto Rico	2022^{SF}	2022-07-24
9	12.33	Kendra Harrison	United States	2023^{SF}	2023-08-23
10	12.34	Ginka Zagorcheva	Bulgaria	1987	1987-09-04
10	12.34	Nia Ali	United States	2019	2019-10-06
10	12.34	Grace Stark	United States	2025	2025-09-16

^{1} Additionally, Tobi Amusan, Britany Anderson, Jasmine Camacho-Quinn and Alia Armstrong have run wind-aided times of 12.06, 12.23, 12,23 & 12.31 (+2.5 m/s) respectively in the 2022 final.

== See also ==
- 110 metres hurdles
- 100 metres hurdles
- Sprint hurdles at the Olympics
