= Commissioner's Cup =

The Commissioner's Cup may refer to:

- Commissioner's Cup (SPHL), former name of the William B. Coffey Trophy of the Southern Professional Hockey League in the US
- PBA Commissioner's Cup, a tournament of the Philippine Basketball Association
- WNBA Commissioner's Cup, an in-season tournament operated by the Women's National Basketball Association
- USL Commissioner's Cup, the regular season title for the former USL First Division
