= 1988 in the sport of athletics =

1988 in athletics
- Major world events: Olympic Games

This article contains an overview of the year 1988 in athletics.

== International events ==
- African Championships
- Balkan Games
- European Indoor Championships
- Olympic Games
- World Cross Country Championships
- World Junior Championships

== World records ==
=== Men ===
EVENT	ATHLETE	MARK	DATE	VENUE
100 metres	Carl Lewis (USA)	9.92	24 September	Seoul, South Korea
400 metres	Butch Reynolds (USA)	43.29	17 August	Zürich, Switzerland
4 × 400 metres relay	United States (USA) • Danny Everett • Steve Lewis • Kevin Robinzine • Butch Reynolds	2:56.16	1 October	Seoul, South Korea
High Jump	Javier Sotomayor (CUB)	2.43m	8 September	Salamanca, Spain
Pole vault	Sergey Bubka (URS)	6.05m	9 June	Bratislava, Czechoslovakia
Pole vault	Sergey Bubka (URS)	6.06m	10 July	Nice, France
Shot put	Ulf Timmermann (GDR)	23.06m	22 May	Chania, Greece
Marathon	Belayneh Dinsamo (ETH)	2:06:50	17 April	Rotterdam, Netherlands

- Carl Lewis finished behind Ben Johnson (9.79) who was disqualified for a failed drugs test
- 4 × 400 team equalled the record by the United States on October 20, 1968, by Vincent Matthews, Ron Freeman, Larry James and Lee Evans.

=== Women ===
EVENT	ATHLETE	MARK	DATE	VENUE
100 metres	Florence Griffith Joyner (USA)	10.49	16 July	Indianapolis, United States
200 metres	Florence Griffith Joyner (USA)	21.56	29 September	Seoul, South Korea
200 metres	Florence Griffith Joyner (USA)	21.34	29 September	Seoul, South Korea
25,000 metres	Karolina Szabó (HUN)	1:29:29.2	22 April	Budapest, Hungary
30,000 metres	Karolina Szabó (HUN)	1:47:05.6	22 April	Budapest, Hungary
100 metres hurdles	Yordanka Donkova (BUL)	12.21	20 August	Stara Zagora, Bulgaria
4 × 400 m Relay	Soviet Union (URS) • Tatyana Ledovskaya • Olga Nazarova • Mariya Pinigina • Olga Bryzgina	3:15.17	1 October	Seoul, South Korea
Long jump	Galina Chistyakova (URS)	7.52 m	11 June	Leningrad, Soviet Union
Discus throw	Gabriele Reinsch (GDR)	76.80 m	9 July	Neubrandenburg, East Germany
Javelin throw	Petra Felke (GDR)	80.00 m	9 September	Potsdam, East Germany
Heptathlon	Jackie Joyner-Kersee (USA)	7215	16 July	Indianapolis, United States
Heptathlon	Jackie Joyner-Kersee (USA)	7291	24 September	Seoul, South Korea

- Many observers believe Griffith-Joyner's time of 10.49 should not have been accepted as a record due to excessive following wind
- Christyakova equalled the previous record of 7.45m with a prior jump

== Men's Best Year Performers ==
=== 100 metres ===
Main race this year: Men's Olympic 100 metres

RANK	1988 WORLD BEST PERFORMERS	TIME
1.	Carl Lewis (USA)	9.92
2.	Linford Christie (GBR)	9.97
—	Calvin Smith (USA)	9.97
4.	Joe DeLoach (USA)	10.03
—	Dennis Mitchell (USA)	10.03

=== 200 metres ===
Main race this year: Men's Olympic 200 metres

RANK	1988 WORLD BEST PERFORMERS	TIME
1.	Joe DeLoach (USA)	19.75
2.	Carl Lewis (USA)	19.79
3.	Lorenzo Daniel (USA)	19.87
4.	Robson da Silva (BRA)	20.04
5.	Roy Martin (USA)	20.05
—	Albert Robinson (USA)	20.05

=== 400 metres ===
Main race this year: Men's Olympic 400 metres

RANK	1988 WORLD BEST PERFORMERS	TIME
1.	Butch Reynolds (USA)	43.29
2.	Steve Lewis (USA)	43.87
3.	Danny Everett (USA)	43.98
4.	Roberto Hernández (CUB)	44.22
5.	Darren Clark (AUS)	44.38

=== 800 metres ===
Main race this year: Men's Olympic 800 metres

RANK	1988 WORLD BEST PERFORMERS	TIME
1.	Johnny Gray (USA)	1:42.65
2.	José Luíz Barbosa (BRA)	1:43.20
3.	Steve Cram (GBR)	1:43.42
4.	Paul Ereng (KEN)	1:43.45
5.	Saïd Aouita (MAR)	1:43.86

=== 1,500 metres ===
Main race this year: Men's Olympic 1,500 metres

RANK	1988 WORLD BEST PERFORMERS	TIME
1.	Steve Cram (GBR)	3:30.95
2.	Jim Spivey (USA)	3:31.01
3.	Saïd Aouita (MAR)	3:32.69
4.	Peter Elliott (GBR)	3:32.94
5.	Jens-Peter Herold (GDR)	3:33.33

=== Mile ===
RANK	1988 WORLD BEST PERFORMERS	TIME
1.	Steve Cram (GBR)	3:48.85
2.	Peter Elliott (GBR)	3:49.20
3.	Jens-Peter Herold (GDR)	3:49.22
4.	Abdi Bile (SOM)	3:49.40
5.	Steve Scott (USA)	3:50.09

=== 3,000 metres ===
RANK	1988 WORLD BEST PERFORMERS	TIME
1.	Sydney Maree (USA)	7:38.79
2.	Brahim Boutayeb (MAR)	7:43.22
3.	Pierre Délèze (SUI)	7:43.46
4.	Paul Arpin (FRA)	7:43.58
5.	Saïd Aouita (MAR)	7:43.65

=== 5,000 metres ===
Main race this year: Men's Olympic 5,000 metres

RANK	1988 WORLD BEST PERFORMERS	TIME
1.	John Ngugi (KEN)	13:11.70
2.	Dieter Baumann (FRG)	13:15.52
3.	José Regalo (POR)	13:15.62
4.	Hansjörg Kunze (GDR)	13:15.73
5.	Sydney Maree (USA)	13:15.85

=== 10,000 metres ===
Main race this year: Men's Olympic 10,000 metres

RANK	1988 WORLD BEST PERFORMERS	TIME
1.	Brahim Boutayeb (MAR)	27:21.46
2.	Eamonn Martin (GBR)	27:23.06
3.	Salvatore Antibo (ITA)	27:23.55
4.	Arturo Barrios (MEX)	27:25.07
5.	Kipkemboi Kimeli (KEN)	27:25.16

=== Half marathon ===
RANK	1988 WORLD BEST PERFORMERS	TIME
1.	John Treacy (IRL)	1:01:00

=== Marathon ===
Main race this year: Men's Olympic Marathon

RANK	1988 WORLD BEST PERFORMERS	TIME
1.	Belayneh Dinsamo (ETH)	2:06:50
2.	Hussein Ahmed Salah (DJI)	2:07:07
3.	Abebe Mekonnen (ETH)	2:07:35
4.	Hiromi Taniguchi (JPN)	2:07:40
5.	Stephen Jones (WAL)	2:08:20

=== 110m hurdles ===
Main race this year: Men's Olympic 110m hurdles

RANK	1988 WORLD BEST PERFORMERS	TIME
1.	Roger Kingdom (USA)	12.97
2.	Colin Jackson (GBR)	13.11
3.	Mark McKoy (CAN)	13.17
—	Tonie Campbell (USA)	13.17
5.	Aleksandr Markin (URS)	13.20

=== 400m hurdles ===
Main race this year: Men's Olympic 400m hurdles

RANK	1988 WORLD BEST PERFORMERS	TIME
1.	Andre Phillips (USA)	47.19
2.	Amadou Dia Bâ (SEN)	47.23
3.	Edwin Moses (USA)	47.37
4.	Kevin Young (USA)	47.72
5.	Danny Harris (USA)	47.74

=== 3,000m steeplechase ===
Main race this year: Men's Olympic 3,000m steeplechase

RANK	1988 WORLD BEST PERFORMERS	TIME
1.	Julius Kariuki (KEN)	8:05.51
2.	Peter Koech (KEN)	8:06.79
3.	Mark Rowland (GBR)	8:07.96
4.	Patrick Sang (KEN)	8:12.00
5.	Alessandro Lambruschini (ITA)	8:12.17

=== High jump ===
Main competition this year: Men's Olympic High Jump

RANK	1988 WORLD BEST PERFORMERS	HEIGHT
1.	Javier Sotomayor (CUB)	2.43
2.	Sergey Malchenko (URS)	2.38
—	Hennadiy Avdyeyenko (URS)	2.38
4.	Tom McCants (USA)	2.37
—	Jerome Carter (USA)	2.37
—	Sorin Matei (ROU)	2.37
—	Patrik Sjöberg (SWE)	2.37

=== Long jump ===
Main competition this year: Men's Olympic Long Jump

RANK	1988 WORLD BEST PERFORMERS	DISTANCE
1.	Carl Lewis (USA)	8.76
2.	Larry Myricks (USA)	8.74
3.	Mike Powell (USA)	8.49
4.	Leonid Voloshin (URS)	8.46
5.	Eric Metcalf (USA)	8.44

=== Triple jump ===
Main competition this year: Men's Olympic Triple Jump

RANK	1988 WORLD BEST PERFORMERS	DISTANCE
1.	Khristo Markov (BUL)	17.77
2.	Igor Lapshin (URS)	17.69
3.	Oleg Protsenko (URS)	17.68
4.	Mike Conley (USA)	17.59
5.	Māris Bružiks (URS)	17.56

=== Discus ===
Main competition this year: Men's Olympic Discus Throw

RANK	1988 WORLD BEST PERFORMERS	DISTANCE
1.	Jürgen Schult (GDR)	70.46
2.	Yuriy Dumchev (URS)	70.30
3.	Romas Ubartas (URS)	70.06
4.	Mike Buncic (USA)	68.92
5.	Vladimir Zinchenko (URS)	68.88

=== Shot put ===
Main competition this year: Men's Olympic Shot Put

RANK	1988 WORLD BEST PERFORMERS	DISTANCE
1.	Ulf Timmermann (GDR)	23.06
2.	Werner Günthör (SUI)	22.75
3.	Randy Barnes (USA)	22.42
4.	Udo Beyer (GDR)	22.10
5.	Sergey Smirnov (URS)	21.88

=== Hammer ===
RANK	1988 WORLD BEST PERFORMERS	DISTANCE
1.	Yuriy Sedykh (URS)	85.14
2.	Sergey Litvinov (URS)	84.80
3.	Jüri Tamm (URS)	84.16
4.	Igor Nikulin (URS)	83.78
5.	Igor Astapkovich (URS)	83.44

=== Javelin (new design) ===
Main competition this year: Men's Olympic Javelin Throw

RANK	1988 WORLD BEST PERFORMERS	DISTANCE
1.	Jan Železný (TCH)	86.88
2.	Tapio Korjus (FIN)	86.50
3.	Klaus Tafelmeier (FRG)	85.96
4.	Einar Vilhjálmsson (ISL)	84.66
5.	Silvio Warsönke (GDR)	84.14

=== Pole vault ===
Main competition this year: Men's Olympic Pole Vault

RANK	1988 WORLD BEST PERFORMERS	HEIGHT
1.	Sergey Bubka (URS)	6.06
2.	Radion Gataullin (URS)	5.95
3.	Miroslaw Chmara (POL)	5.90
4.	Kory Tarpenning (USA)	5.89
5.	Earl Bell (USA)	5.87

=== Decathlon ===
Main competition this year: Men's Olympic Decathlon

RANK	1988 WORLD BEST PERFORMERS	POINTS
1.	Christian Plaziat (FRA)	8512
2.	Valter Külvet (EST)	8506
3.	Christian Schenk (GDR)	8488
4.	Robert de Wit (NED)	8447
5.	Alexander Apaychev (UKR)	8424

== Women's Best Year Performers ==
Main race this year: Women's Olympic 100 metres

=== 100 metres ===
RANK	1988 WORLD BEST PERFORMERS	TIME
1.	Florence Griffith Joyner (USA)	10.49
2.	Evelyn Ashford (USA)	10.81
3.	Sheila Echols (USA)	10.83
4.	Anelia Nuneva (BUL)	10.85
5.	Diane Williams (USA)	10.86

=== 200 metres ===
Main race this year: Women's Olympic 200 metres

RANK	1988 WORLD BEST PERFORMERS	TIME
1.	Florence Griffith Joyner (USA)	21.34
2.	Grace Jackson (JAM)	21.72
3.	Heike Drechsler (GDR)	21.84
4.	Pam Marshall (USA)	21.93
5.	Merlene Ottey (JAM)	21.99

=== 400 metres ===
Main race this year: Women's Olympic 400 metres

RANK	1988 WORLD BEST PERFORMERS	TIME
1.	Olga Bryzgina (URS)	48.65
2.	Olga Nazarova (URS)	49.11
3.	Petra Müller (GDR)	49.30
4.	Aelita Yurchenko (URS)	49.47
5.	Grace Jackson (JAM)	49.57

=== 800 metres ===
Main race this year: Women's Olympic 800 metres

RANK	1988 WORLD BEST PERFORMERS	TIME
1.	Inna Yevseyeva (URS)	1:56.0
—	Nadiya Olizarenko (URS)	1:56.0
3.	Sigrun Wodars (GDR)	1:56.10
4.	Ana Fidelia Quirot (CUB)	1:56.36
5.	Paula Ivan (ROU)	1:56.42

=== 1,500 metres ===
Main race this year: Women's Olympic 1,500 metres

RANK	1988 WORLD BEST PERFORMERS	TIME
1.	Paula Ivan (ROU)	3:53.96
2.	Mary Slaney (USA)	3:58.92
3.	Laimutė Baikauskaitė (URS)	4:00.24
4.	Tatyana Samolenko (URS)	4:00.30
5.	Regina Jacobs (USA)	4:00.46

=== Mile ===
RANK	1988 WORLD BEST PERFORMERS	TIME
1.	Mary Slaney (USA)	4:21.25
2.	Paula Ivan (ROU)	4:25.80

=== 3,000 metres ===
Main race this year: Women's Olympic 3,000 metres

RANK	1988 WORLD BEST PERFORMERS	TIME
1.	Tatyana Samolenko (URS)	8:26.53
2.	Paula Ivan (ROU)	8:27.15
3.	Yvonne Murray (GBR)	8:29.02
4.	Yelena Romanova (URS)	8:30.45
5.	Natalya Artyomova (URS)	8:31.67

=== 5,000 metres ===
RANK	1988 WORLD BEST PERFORMERS	TIME
1.	Liz McColgan (GBR)	15:03.29
2.	Ingrid Kristiansen (NOR)	15:10.89
3.	Olga Bondarenko (URS)	15:11.16
4.	Lynn Jennings (USA)	15:11.83
5.	Lynn Nelson (USA)	15:12.7

=== 10,000 metres ===
Main race this year: Women's Olympic 10,000 metres

RANK	1988 WORLD BEST PERFORMERS	TIME
1.	Olga Bondarenko (URS)	31:05.21
2.	Liz McColgan (GBR)	31:06.99
3.	Yelena Zhupiyeva (URS)	31:19.82
4.	Kathrin Ullrich (GDR)	31:26.79
5.	Ingrid Kristiansen (NOR)	31:31.37

=== Half marathon ===
RANK	1988 WORLD BEST PERFORMERS	TIME
1.	Grete Waitz (NOR)	1:08:49

=== Marathon ===
Main race this year: Women's Olympic Marathon

RANK	1988 WORLD BEST PERFORMERS	TIME
1.	Lisa Martin (AUS)	2:23:51
2.	Rosa Mota (POR)	2:24:30
3.	Ingrid Kristiansen (NOR)	2:25:41
4.	Katrin Dörre (GDR)	2:26:21
5.	Tatyana Polovinskaya (URS)	2:27:05

=== 100m hurdles ===
Main race this year: Women's Olympic 100m hurdles

RANK	1988 WORLD BEST PERFORMERS	TIME
1.	Yordanka Donkova (BUL)	12.21
2.	Ginka Zagorcheva (BUL)	12.48
—	Gloria Siebert (GDR)	12.48
—	Nataliya Grygoryeva (URS)	12.48
5.	Cornelia Oschkenat (GDR)	12.52

=== 400m hurdles ===
Main race this year: Women's Olympic 400m hurdles

RANK	1988 WORLD BEST PERFORMERS	TIME
1.	Debbie Flintoff-King (AUS)	53.17
2.	Tatyana Ledovskaya (URS)	53.18
3.	Ellen Fiedler (GDR)	53.63
4.	Sabine Busch (GDR)	53.69
5.	Sally Gunnell (GBR)	54.03

=== High Jump ===
Main competition this year: Women's Olympic High Jump

RANK	1988 WORLD BEST PERFORMERS	HEIGHT
1.	Stefka Kostadinova (BUL)	2.07 m
2.	Louise Ritter (USA)	2.03 m
3.	Silvia Costa (CUB)	2.02 m
4.	Olga Turchak (URS)	2.00 m
—	Larisa Kositsyna (URS)	2.00 m
—	Alina Astafei (ROU)	2.00 m

=== Long Jump ===
Main competition this year: Women's Olympic Long Jump

RANK	1988 WORLD BEST PERFORMERS	DISTANCE
1.	Galina Chistyakova (URS)	7.52 m
2.	Heike Drechsler (GDR)	7.48 m
3.	Jackie Joyner-Kersee (USA)	7.40 m
4.	Yelena Belevskaya (URS)	7.36 m
5.	Yelena Khlopotnova (URS)	7.29 m

=== Shot put ===
Main competition this year: Women's Olympic Shot Put

RANK	1988 WORLD BEST PERFORMERS	DISTANCE
1.	Natalya Lisovskaya (URS)	22.55 m
2.	Li Meisu (CHN)	21.76 m
3.	Natalya Akhrimenko (URS)	21.73 m
4.	Huang Zhihong (CHN)	21.28 m
5.	Heike Hartwig (GDR)	21.27 m

=== Discus throw ===
Main competition this year: Women's Olympic Discus Throw

RANK	1988 WORLD BEST PERFORMERS	DISTANCE
1.	Gabriele Reinsch (GDR)	76.80 m
2.	Ilke Wyludda (GDR)	74.40 m
3.	Daniela Costian (ROM)	73.84 m
4.	Diana Gansky (GDR)	72.94 m
5.	Martina Hellmann (GDR)	72.30 m

=== Javelin (old design) ===
Main competition this year: Women's Olympic Javelin Throw

RANK	1988 WORLD BEST PERFORMERS	DISTANCE
1.	Petra Felke (GDR)	80.00 m
2.	Tiina Lillak (FIN)	73.30 m
3.	Tessa Sanderson (GBR)	71.70 m
4.	Silke Renk (GDR)	71.00 m
5.	Ivonne Leal (CUB)	70.48 m

=== Heptathlon ===
Main competition this year: Women's Olympic Heptathlon

RANK	1988 WORLD BEST PERFORMERS	POINTS
1.	Jackie Joyner-Kersee (USA)	7291
2.	Sabine John (GDR)	6897
3.	Anke Behmer (GDR)	6858
4.	Chantal Beaugeant (FRA)	6702
5.	Ines Schulz (GDR)	6660

== Births ==
- January 17 — Anna Bulgakova, Russian hammer thrower
- January 21 — Ashton Eaton, American decathlete
- January 26 — Gilbert Yegon, Kenyan long-distance runner
- April 29 — Jan Kudlička, Czech pole vaulter
- May 20 — Yomara Hinestroza, Colombian sprinter
- May 26 — Dani Samuels, Australian discus thrower
- June 22 — Yekaterina Yevseyeva, Kazakh high jumper
- July 5 — Vincent Chepkok, Kenyan long-distance runner
- August 4 — Liam Zamel-Paez, Australian high jumper
- August 10 — Robert Kiprono Cheruiyot, Kenyan marathon runner
- August 24 — Matteo Galvan, Italian sprinter
- August 29 — Harry Aikines-Aryeetey, English sprinter
- September 5 — Chu Yafei, Chinese race walker
- October 31 — Eglė Balčiūnaitė, Lithuanian middle-distance runner
- December 17 — David Rudisha, Kenyan middle-distance runner

== Deaths ==
- July 8 — Ray Barbuti (83), American athlete (b. 1905)
