= 1987 in the sport of athletics =

1987 in athletics
- Major world events: World Championships; World Indoor Championships

This article contains an overview of the year 1987 in athletics.

== International Events ==
- All-Africa Games
- Asian Championships
- Central American and Caribbean Championships
- European Indoor Championships
- Mediterranean Games
- Pan American Games
- World Championships
- World Indoor Championships
- World Cross Country Championships
- World Student Games

== World records ==
=== Men ===
EVENT	ATHLETE	MARK	DATE	VENUE
2,000 metres	Saïd Aouita (MAR)	4:50.81	16 July	Paris
5,000 metres	Saïd Aouita (MAR)	12:58.39	22 July	Rome, Italy
High jump	Patrik Sjöberg (SWE)	2.42 m	30 June	Stockholm, Sweden
Pole vault	Sergey Bubka (URS)	6.03 m	23 June	Prague, Czechoslovakia
Shot put	Alessandro Andrei (ITA)	22.72m	12 August	Viareggio, Italy
Shot put	Alessandro Andrei (ITA)	22.84m	12 August	Viareggio, Italy
Shot put	Alessandro Andrei (ITA)	22.91m	12 August	Viareggio, Italy
Javelin (new)	Jan Železný (TCH)	87.66 m	31 May	Nitra, Czechoslovakia

Carl Lewis (USA) equalled the world record in the men's 100 metres held by countryman Calvin Smith since 1983-07-03, clocking 9.93 seconds on 1987-08-30 at the World Championships in Rome, Italy.

=== Women ===
EVENT	ATHLETE	MARK	DATE	VENUE
100m hurdles	Ginka Zagorcheva (BUL)	12.25 s	8 August	Drama, Greece
High Jump	Stefka Kostadinova (BUL)	2.09 m	30 August	Rome, Italy
Shot put	Natalya Lisovskaya (URS)	22.60 m	7 June	Moscow, Soviet Union
Shot put	Natalya Lisovskaya (URS)	22.63 m	7 June	Moscow, Soviet Union
Javelin (old)	Petra Meier (GDR)	78.90 m	29 July	Leipzig, East Germany

Jackie Joyner-Kersee (USA) equalled the world record in the women's long jump held by East Germany's Heike Drechsler since 1986-06-21, jumping 7.45 metres on 1987-08-13 at a meet in Indianapolis.

== Men's Best Year Performers ==
=== 100 metres ===
Main race this year: World Championships 100 metres

RANK	1987 WORLD BEST PERFORMERS	TIME
1.	Carl Lewis (USA)	9.931
2.	Linford Christie (GBR)	10.03
3.	Mark Witherspoon (USA)	10.04
4.	Andrés Simón (CUB)	10.06
5.	Lee McRae (USA)	10.07
—	Calvin Smith (USA)	10.07

=== 200 metres ===
Main race this year: World Championships 200 metres

RANK	1987 WORLD BEST PERFORMERS	TIME
1.	Carl Lewis (USA)	19.92
2.	Floyd Heard (USA)	19.95
3.	Dwayne Evans (USA)	20.08
4.	Calvin Smith (USA)	20.10
5.	Attila Kovács (HUN)	20.11

=== 400 metres ===
Main race this year: World Championships 400 metres

RANK	1987 WORLD BEST PERFORMERS	TIME
1.	Butch Reynolds (USA)	44.10
2.	Innocent Egbunike (NGR)	44.17
3.	Thomas Schönlebe (GDR)	44.33
4.	Danny Everett (USA)	44.47
5.	Derek Redmond (GBR)	44.50

=== 800 metres ===
Main race this year: World Championships 800 metres

RANK	1987 WORLD BEST PERFORMERS	TIME
1.	Billy Konchellah (KEN)	1:43.06
2.	Peter Elliott (GBR)	1:43.41
—	José Luíz Barbosa (BRA)	1:43.76
4.	Philippe Collard (FRA)	1:43.95
5.	Johnny Gray (USA)	1:44.09

=== 1,500 metres ===
Main race this year: World Championships 1.500 metres

RANK	1987 WORLD BEST PERFORMERS	TIME
1.	Saïd Aouita (MAR)	3:30.69
2.	Steve Cram (GBR)	3:31.43
3.	Abdi Bile (SOM)	3:31.71
4.	José Luis González (ESP)	3:33.01
5.	Peter Elliott (GBR)	3:33.23

=== Mile ===
RANK	1987 WORLD BEST PERFORMERS	TIME
1.	Saïd Aouita (MAR)	3:46.76
2.	Steve Cram (GBR)	3:50.08
3.	Abdi Bile (SOM)	3:50.75
4.	Johan Fourie (RSA)	3:50.82
5.	John Gladwin (GBR)	3:51.02

=== 3,000 metres ===
RANK	1987 WORLD BEST PERFORMERS	TIME
1.	Dieter Baumann (FRG)	7:40.25
2.	Francesco Panetta (ITA)	7:42.73
3.	José Luis González (ESP)	7:42.93
4.	Frank O'Mara (IRL)	7:42.99
5.	Sydney Maree (USA)	7:43.13

=== 5,000 metres ===
Main race this year: World Championships 5.000 metres

RANK	1987 WORLD BEST PERFORMERS	TIME
1.	Saïd Aouita (MAR)	12:58.39
2.	Jack Buckner (GBR)	13:10.48
3.	José Luis González (ESP)	13:12.34
4.	José Manuel Abascal (ESP)	13:12.49
5.	Frank O'Mara (IRL)	13:13.02

=== 10,000 metres ===
Main race this year: World Championships 10.000 metres

RANK	1987 WORLD BEST PERFORMERS	TIME
1.	Francesco Panetta (ITA)	27:26.95
2.	Wodajo Bulti (ETH)	27:29.41
3.	Jean-Louis Prianon (FRA)	27:34.38
4.	Takeyuki Nakayama (JPN)	27:35.33
5.	Paul Kipkoech (KEN)	27:38.63

=== Half marathon ===
RANK	1987 WORLD BEST PERFORMERS	TIME
1.	Matthew Temane (RSA)	1:00:10

=== Marathon ===
Main race this year: World Championships Marathon

RANK	1987 WORLD BEST PERFORMERS	TIME
1.	Takeyuki Nakayama (JPN)	2:08:18
2.	Hiromi Taniguchi (JPN)	2:09:50
3.	El Mostafa Nechchadi (MAR)	2:10:09
4.	Hugh Jones (GBR)	2:10:11
5.	Gianni Poli (ITA)	2:10:15

=== 110m hurdles ===
Main race this year: World Championships 110m hurdles

RANK	1987 WORLD BEST PERFORMERS	TIME
1.	Greg Foster (USA)	13.17
2.	Tonie Campbell (USA)	13.19
3.	Mark McKoy (CAN)	13.23
4.	Rod Woodson (USA)	13.29
—	Jon Ridgeon (GBR)	13.29
—	Arthur Blake (USA)	13.29

=== 400m hurdles ===
Main race this year: World Championships 400m hurdles

RANK	1987 WORLD BEST PERFORMERS	TIME
1.	Edwin Moses (USA)	47.46
2.	Danny Harris (USA)	47.48
—	Harald Schmid (FRG)	47.48
4.	Amadou Dia Bâ (SEN)	48.03
5.	Kevin Young (USA)	48.15

=== 3,000m steeplechase ===
RANK	1987 WORLD BEST PERFORMERS	TIME
1.	Francesco Panetta (ITA)	8:08.57
2.	Hagen Melzer (GDR)	8:10.32
3.	William Van Dijck (BEL)	8:12.18
4.	Julius Korir (KEN)	8:12.80
5.	Raymond Pannier (FRA)	8:13.88

=== High jump ===
RANK	1987 WORLD BEST PERFORMERS	HEIGHT
1.	Patrik Sjöberg (SWE)	2.42
2.	Igor Paklin (URS)	2.38
—	Hennadiy Avdyeyenko (URS)	2.38
4.	Javier Sotomayor (CUB)	2.37
5.	Jim Howard (USA)	2.36
—	Ján Zvara (TCH)	2.36

=== Long jump ===
RANK	1987 WORLD BEST PERFORMERS	DISTANCE
1.	Robert Emmiyan (URS)	8.86
2.	Carl Lewis (USA)	8.75
3.	Larry Myricks (USA)	8.66
4.	Jaime Jefferson (CUB)	8.51
5.	Giovanni Evangelisti (ITA)	8.43

=== Triple jump ===
RANK	1987 WORLD BEST PERFORMERS	DISTANCE
1.	Khristo Markov (BUL)	17.92
2.	Mike Conley (USA)	17.87
3.	Aleksandr Kovalenko (URS)	17.77
4.	Aleksandr Yakovlev (URS)	17.65
5.	Oleg Protsenko (URS)	17.61

=== Discus ===
RANK	1987 WORLD BEST PERFORMERS	DISTANCE
1.	Jürgen Schult (GDR)	69.52
2.	Mike Buncic (USA)	68.98
3.	Stefan Fernholm (SWE)	68.30
4.	Luis Delís (CUB)	67.92
5.	Alwin Wagner (FRG)	67.80

=== Shot put ===
RANK	1987 WORLD BEST PERFORMERS	DISTANCE
1.	Alessandro Andrei (ITA)	22.91
2.	John Brenner (USA)	22.52
3.	Werner Günthör (SUI)	22.47
4.	Udo Beyer (GDR)	22.31
5.	Ulf Timmermann (GDR)	22.01

=== Hammer ===
RANK	1987 WORLD BEST PERFORMERS	DISTANCE
1.	Sergey Litvinov (URS)	83.48
2.	Igor Astapkovich (URS)	82.96
3.	Vyacheslav Korovin (URS)	82.24
4.	Jüri Tamm (URS)	82.02
5.	Igor Nikulin (URS)	82.00

=== Javelin (new design) ===
RANK	1987 WORLD BEST PERFORMERS	DISTANCE
1.	Jan Železný (TCH)	87.66
2.	Klaus Tafelmeier (FRG)	86.64
3.	Mick Hill (GBR)	85.24
4.	Viktor Yevsyukov (URS)	85.16
5.	Lev Shatilo (URS)	84.30

=== Pole vault ===
RANK	1987 WORLD BEST PERFORMERS	HEIGHT
1.	Sergey Bubka (URS)	6.03
2.	Joe Dial (USA)	5.96
3.	Radion Gataullin (URS)	5.90
4.	Thierry Vigneron (FRA)	5.85
5.	Mike Tully (USA)	5.83

=== Decathlon ===
Main competition this year: World Championships Decathlon

RANK	1987 WORLD BEST PERFORMERS	POINTS
1.	Torsten Voss (GDR)	8680
2.	Siegfried Wentz (FRG)	8645
3.	Pavel Tarnavetskiy (URS)	8375
4.	Simon Poelman (NZL)	8359
5.	Tim Bright (USA)	8340

== Women's Best Year Performers ==
=== 100 metres ===
RANK	1987 WORLD BEST PERFORMERS	TIME
1.	Anelia Nuneva (BUL)	10.86
—	Silke Gladisch (GDR)	10.86
3.	Merlene Ottey (JAM)	10.87
4.	Marlies Göhr (GDR)	10.93
5.	Heike Drechsler (GDR)	10.95

=== 200 metres ===
RANK	1987 WORLD BEST PERFORMERS	TIME
1.	Silke Gladisch (GDR)	21.74
2.	Florence Griffith (USA)	21.96
3.	Anelia Nuneva (BUL)	22.01
4.	Pam Marshall (USA)	22.06
—	Merlene Ottey (JAM)	22.06

=== 400 metres ===
RANK	1987 WORLD BEST PERFORMERS	TIME
1.	Olga Bryzgina (URS)	49.38
2.	Petra Müller (GDR)	49.64
3.	Mariya Pinigina (URS)	49.87
4.	Lillie Leatherwood (USA)	49.95
5.	Olga Nazarova (URS)	49.96

=== 800 metres ===
RANK	1987 WORLD BEST PERFORMERS	TIME
1.	Sigrun Wodars (GDR)	1:55.26
2.	Christine Wachtel (GDR)	1:55.32
3.	Lyubov Gurina (URS)	1:55.56
4.	Ana Fidelia Quirot (CUB)	1:55.84
5.	Slobodanka Čolović (YUG)	1:56.51

=== 1,500 metres ===
RANK	1987 WORLD BEST PERFORMERS	TIME
1.	Tatyana Samolenko (URS)	3:58.56
2.	Hildegard Körner (GDR)	3:58.67
3.	Doina Melinte (ROU)	3:59.27
4.	Cornelia Bürki (SUI)	3:59.90
5.	Andrea Lange (GDR)	4:00.07

=== Mile ===
RANK	1987 WORLD BEST PERFORMERS	TIME
1.	Doina Melinte (ROU)	4:24.05
2.	Elly van Hulst (NED)	4:25.13
3.	Diana Richburg (USA)	4:25.77
4.	Liz Lynch (GBR)	4:26.11
5.	Maricica Puică (ROU)	4:26.70

=== 3,000 metres ===
RANK	1987 WORLD BEST PERFORMERS	TIME
1.	Ulrike Bruns (GDR)	8:38.1
2.	Yelena Zhupiyeva (URS)	8:38.5
3.	Tatyana Samolenko (URS)	8:38.73
4.	Paula Ivan (ROU)	8:39.28
5.	Maricica Puică (ROU)	8:39.45

=== 5,000 metres ===
RANK	1987 WORLD BEST PERFORMERS	TIME
1.	Liz Lynch (GBR)	15:01.08
2.	Angela Tooby (GBR)	15:13.22
3.	Ingrid Kristiansen (NOR)	15:19.76
4.	Wendy Sly (GBR)	15:21.45
5.	Maricica Puică (ROU)	15:23.48

=== 10,000 metres ===
RANK	1987 WORLD BEST PERFORMERS	TIME
1.	Ingrid Kristiansen (NOR)	31:05.85
2.	Yelena Zhupiyeva (URS)	31:09.40
3.	Kathrin Ullrich (GDR)	31:11.34
4.	Olga Bondarenko (URS)	31:18.38
5.	Liz Lynch (GBR)	31:19.82

=== Half marathon ===
RANK	1987 WORLD BEST PERFORMERS	TIME
1.	Ingrid Kristiansen (NOR)	1:06:40

=== Marathon ===
RANK	1987 WORLD BEST PERFORMERS	TIME
1.	Ingrid Kristiansen (NOR)	2:22:48
2.	Rosa Mota (POR)	2:25:17
3.	Katrin Dörre (GDR)	2:25:24
4.	Carla Beurskens (NED)	2:26:34
5.	Priscilla Welch (GBR)	2:26:51

=== 100m hurdles ===
RANK	1987 WORLD BEST PERFORMERS	TIME
1.	Ginka Zagorcheva (BUL)	12.25
2.	Yordanka Donkova (BUL)	12.33
3.	Gloria Siebert (GDR)	12.44
4.	Cornelia Oschkenat (GDR)	12.45

=== 400m hurdles ===
RANK	1987 WORLD BEST PERFORMERS	TIME
1.	Sabine Busch (GDR)	53.24
2.	Cornelia Ullrich (GDR)	53.58
3.	Debbie Flintoff-King (AUS)	53.95
4.	Judi Brown-King (USA)	54.23
5.	Sandra Farmer (JAM)	54.38

=== High Jump ===
RANK	1987 WORLD BEST PERFORMERS	HEIGHT
1.	Stefka Kostadinova (BUL)	2.09 m
2.	Tamara Bykova (URS)	2.04 m
3.	Louise Ritter (USA)	2.01 m
4.	Desiree du Plessis (RSA)	2.00 m
—	Lyudmila Avdeyenko (URS)	2.00 m
—	Svetlana Leseva (BUL)	2.00 m

=== Long Jump ===
RANK	1987 WORLD BEST PERFORMERS	DISTANCE
1.	Jackie Joyner-Kersee (USA)	7.45 m
2.	Heike Drechsler (GDR)	7.40 m
3.	Yelena Belevskaya (URS)	7.39 m
4.	Galina Chistyakova (URS)	7.27 m
5.	Irina Valyukevich (URS)	7.17 m

=== Shot put ===
RANK	1987 WORLD BEST PERFORMERS	DISTANCE
1.	Natalya Lisovskaya (URS)	22.63 m
2.	Claudia Losch (FRG)	22.19 m
3.	Natalya Akhrimenko (URS)	21.34 m
4.	Kathrin Neimke (GDR)	21.21 m
5.	Ines Müller (GDR)	21.20 m

=== Javelin (old design) ===
RANK	1987 WORLD BEST PERFORMERS	DISTANCE
1.	Petra Meier (GDR)	78.90
2.	Fatima Whitbread (GBR)	76.64
3.	Ingrid Thyssen (GDR)	69.68
4.	Susanne Jung (GDR)	69.60
5.	Beate Peters (FRG)	68.84

=== Heptathlon ===
RANK	1987 WORLD BEST PERFORMERS	POINTS
1.	Jackie Joyner-Kersee (USA)	7128
2.	Anke Behmer (GDR)	6692
3.	Svetlana Buraga (URS)	6585
4.	Larisa Nikitina (URS)	6564
5.	Jane Frederick (USA)	6533

== Births ==
- January 1 — Rytis Sakalauskas, Lithuanian sprinter
- January 17 — Svetlana Radzivil, Uzbekistani high jumper
- January 27 — Liliya Kulyk, Ukrainian triple jumper
- March 5 — Vitalij Kozlov, Lithuanian middle-distance runner
- April 17 — Atsede Baysa, Ethiopian long-distance runner
- April 20 — Elijah Kipterege, Kenyan long-distance runner
- April 24 — Franklin Nazareno, Ecuadorian sprinter
- July 14 — Margus Hunt, Estonian discus thrower
- July 22 — Hugo Chila, Ecuadorian long jumper and triple jumper
- August 9 — Marek Niit, Estonian sprinter
- September 1 — Leonel Suárez, Cuban decathlete
- September 13 — Vincent Kipruto, Kenyan long-distance runner
- October 3 — Ancuța Bobocel, Romanian long-distance runner
- November 1 — Jimmy Adar, Ugandan middle-distance runner
- November 17 — Nadiya Dusanova, Uzbekistani high jumper
- December 1 — Tabarie Henry, United States Virgin Islands sprinter
- December 21 — Denis Alekseyev, Russian sprinter

== Deaths ==
- March 17 — Georg Lammers (81), German athlete (b. 1905)
- October 20 — Jerzy Chromik (56), Polish long-distance runner (b. 1931)
