= 1987 World Championships in Athletics – Women's 10,000 metres =

The women's 10,000 metres event featured at the 1987 World Championships in Rome, Italy. There were a total number of 37 participating athletes, with the final being held on 4 September 1987.

== Medalists ==
Gold	Ingrid Kristiansen; Norway (NOR)
Silver	Yelena Zhupiyeva; Soviet Union (URS)
Bronze	Kathrin Ullrich; East Germany (GDR)

== Records ==
Existing records at the start of the event.

World record	Ingrid Kristiansen (NOR)	30:13.74	Oslo, Norway	July 5, 1986
Championship record	New event			

== Final ==
RANK	FINAL	TIME
	Ingrid Kristiansen (NOR)	31:05.85
	Yelena Zhupiyeva (URS)	31:09.40
	Kathrin Ullrich (GDR)	31:11.34
4.	Olga Bondarenko (URS)	31:18.38
5.	Liz Lynch (GBR)	31:19.82
6.	Lynn Jennings (USA)	31:45.43
7.	Albertina Machado (POR)	31:46.61
8.	Wang Xiuting (CHN)	31:48.88
9.	Angela Tooby (GBR)	31:55.30
10.	Kerstin Preßler (FRG)	31:56.80
11.	Martine Oppliger (SUI)	32:07.49
12.	Marleen Renders (BEL)	32:12.51
13.	Lynn Nelson (USA)	32:22.88
14.	Christine McMiken (NZL)	32:25.67
15.	Francie Larrieu Smith (USA)	32:30.00
16.	Nancy Tinari (CAN)	32:31.55
17.	Aurora Cunha (POR)	32:44.42
18.	Kumi Araki (JPN)	33:15.08
19.	Ana Isabel Alonso (ESP)	33:20.65
20.	Tuija Toivonen (FIN)	33:25.46
21.	Lorraine Moller (NZL)	34:07.26
—	Lieve Slegers (BEL)	DNF

== Heats ==
- Held on Monday 31 August 1987

RANK	HEAT 1	TIME
1.	Kathrin Ullrich (GDR)	33:07.92
2.	Liz Lynch (GBR)	33:09.26
3.	Aurora Cunha (POR)	33:09.86
4.	Ingrid Kristiansen (NOR)	33:10.37
5.	Marleen Renders (BEL)	33:10.95
6.	Lynn Jennings (USA)	33:16.18
7.	Angela Tooby (GBR)	33:20.14
8.	Martine Oppliger (SUI)	33:22.25
9.	Nancy Tinari (CAN)	33:24.20
10.	Kumi Araki (JPN)	33:24.37
11.	Ana Isabel Alonso (ESP)	33:38.37
12.	Christine McMiken (NZL)	33:41.10
13.	Tuija Toivonen (FIN)	33:46.05
14.	Midde Hamrin (SWE)	34:10.36
15.	Danièle Kaber (LUX)	34:24.52
16.	Monica Regonesi (CHI)	34:57.64
17.	Leah Malot (KEN)	36:23.66
—	Maria Curatolo (ITA)	DNF
—	Yelena Romanova (URS)	DNF
—	Karolina Szabo (HUN)	DNS

RANK	HEAT 2	TIME
1.	Yelena Zhupiyeva (URS)	33:32.05
2.	Olga Bondarenko (URS)	33:34.79
3.	Kerstin Preßler (FRG)	33:35.49
4.	Lorraine Moller (NZL)	33:35.73
5.	Wang Xiuting (CHN)	33:36.07
6.	Francie Larrieu Smith (USA)	33:37.36
7.	Albertina Machado (POR)	33:40.87
8.	Lynn Nelson (USA)	33:43.71
9.	Lieve Slegers (BEL)	33:48.91
10.	Susan Crehan (GBR)	33:54.99
11.	Sue Lee (CAN)	34:14.92
12.	Sue Berenda (CAN)	34:15.48
13.	Conceição Ferreira (POR)	34:43.35
14.	Rose Lamb (IRL)	35:00.17
15.	Michelle Bush-Cuke (CAY)	35:30.96
—	Päivi Tikkanen (FIN)	DNF
—	Cristina Tomasini (ITA)	DNF
—	Beverley Lord (GUY)	DNF

== See also ==
- 1986 Women's European Championships 10,000 metres (Stuttgart)
- 1988 Women's Olympic 10,000 metres (Seoul)
- 1990 Women's European Championships 10,000 metres (Split)
- 1991 Women's World Championships 10,000 metres (Tokyo)
