= 10,000 metres at the World Athletics Championships =

Sports competition

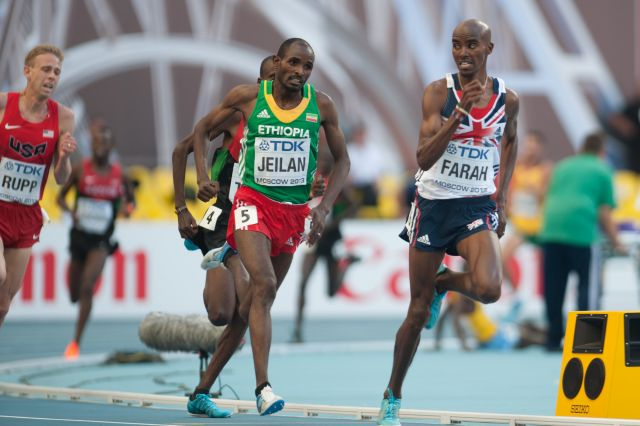
- Ibrahim Jeilan and Mo Farah in the 2013 men's final

Overview
- Gender: Men and women
- Years held: Men: 1983 – 2023; Women: 1987 – 2023

Championship record
- Men: 26:46.31 Kenenisa Bekele (2009)
- Women: 30:04.18 Berhane Adere (2003)

Reigning champion
- Men: Jimmy Gressier (FRA)
- Women: Beatrice Chebet (KEN)

The 10,000 metres at the World Championships in Athletics has been contested by men since the inaugural edition in 1983 and by women since the subsequent edition in 1987. It is the second most prestigious title in the discipline after the 10,000 metres at the Olympics. The competition format is a straight final with typically between twenty and thirty participants. Before 1999, the event had two qualifying heats leading to a final.

The championship records for the event are 26:46.31 minutes for men, set by Kenenisa Bekele in 2009, and 30:04.18 minutes for women, set by Berhane Adere in 2003. The world record has never been broken or equalled at the competition by either men or women, reflecting the lack of pacemaking and athletes' more tactical approach to championship races.

Haile Gebrselassie is the most successful athlete of the event with four gold medals and also a silver and a bronze, spanning a period from 1993 to 2003. His Ethiopian compatriot Kenenisa Bekele matched his feat of four consecutive titles in 2009. Tirunesh Dibaba is the most successful woman, with three gold medals to her name (2005, 2007, 2013, plus a silver in 2017).

Ethiopia is by far the most successful nation in the discipline, with fifteen gold medals and 33 medals in total. Kenya is comfortably the next most successful with seven gold and 25 medals overall. Great Britain and Uganda are the only other nation to have won multiple gold medals, with three in the men's and one in the women's division for Great Britain.

Four winners of the 10,000 m have completed a long-distance double by also winning the 5000 metres at the World Championships in Athletics: Tirunesh Dibaba was the first to do so in 2005, Kenenisa Bekele became the first man to do so in 2009, and Vivian Cheruiyot (2011) and Mo Farah (2013/2015) followed at the subsequent editions. Of these, only Mo Farah has achieved the feat twice, in 2013 and 2015 - either side of which he performed the same feat in consecutive Olympic Games.

One athlete, Sifan Hassan of the Netherlands, has completed a rare 10,000 metres - 1500 metres double, in 2019.

== Age ==
At 15 years, 153 days, Sally Barsosio won the bronze medal in the women's 10,000 m at the 1993 World Championships in Athletics. This makes her the youngest World Championships medallist in any discipline.

- All information from World Athletics.

Distinction	Male			Female		
Distinction	Athlete	Age	Date	Athlete	Age	Date
Youngest champion	Haile Gebrselassie (ETH)	20 years, 126 days	22 Aug 1993	Sally Barsosio (KEN)	19 years, 137 days	5 Aug 1997
Youngest medalist	Richard Chelimo (KEN)	19 years, 183 days	26 Aug 1991	Sally Barsosio (KEN)	15 years, 153 days	21 Aug 1993
Youngest finalist	Assefa Mezgebu (ETH)	17 years, 50 days	8 Aug 1995	Sally Barsosio (KEN)	15 years, 153 days	21 Aug 1993
Youngest participant	Assefa Mezgebu (ETH)	17 years, 47 days	5 Aug 1995	Enh Od Tevdenshigmed (MGL)	14 years, 267 days	19 Aug 1993
Oldest champion	Mo Farah (GBR)	34 years, 134 days	4 Aug 2017	Vivian Cheruiyot (KEN)	31 years, 347 days	24 Aug 2015
Oldest medalist	Mo Farah (GBR)	34 years, 134 days	4 Aug 2017	Joanne Pavey (GBR)	33 years, 339 days	25 Aug 2007
Oldest finalist	Carlos Lopes (POR)	36 years, 170 days	7 Aug 1983	Edith Masai (KEN)	38 years, 124 days	6 Aug 2005
Oldest participant	Mohamed Ezzher (FRA)	38 years, 120 days	24 Aug 1999	Sinead Diver (AUS)	42 years, 223 days	28 Sep 2019

== Doping ==
Elvan Abeylegesse of Turkey became the first athlete to be disqualified from the World Championships 10,000 metres for doping. This ban came retrospectively as a 2015 retest of a frozen sample of urine from the 2007 World Championships in Athletics showed the presence of a banned substance. She was stripped of her silver medal.

No other competitors have been banned from the event for doping. Outside of the competition, the 2003 women's bronze medallist Sun Yingjie was banned for doping in 2005.

== Medalists ==
=== Men ===
In the sixteen editions until 2017, the men's race at the World Championships has been dominated by three men; Ethiopians Haile Gebrselassie and Kenenisa Bekele, and Great Britain's Mo Farah - between them, they have won eleven of the sixteen editions held, won silver twice, and bronze once.

Championships	Gold	Silver	Bronze
1983 Helsinki	Alberto Cova (ITA)	Werner Schildhauer (GDR)	Hansjörg Kunze (GDR)
1987 Rome	Paul Kipkoech (KEN)	Francesco Panetta (ITA)	Hansjörg Kunze (GDR)
1991 Tokyo	Moses Tanui (KEN)	Richard Chelimo (KEN)	Khalid Skah (MAR)
1993 Stuttgart	Haile Gebrselassie (ETH)	Moses Tanui (KEN)	Richard Chelimo (KEN)
1995 Gothenburg	Haile Gebrselassie (ETH)	Khalid Skah (MAR)	Paul Tergat (KEN)
1997 Athens	Haile Gebrselassie (ETH)	Paul Tergat (KEN)	Salah Hissou (MAR)
1999 Seville	Haile Gebrselassie (ETH)	Paul Tergat (KEN)	Assefa Mezgebu (ETH)
2001 Edmonton	Charles Kamathi (KEN)	Assefa Mezgebu (ETH)	Haile Gebrselassie (ETH)
2003 Saint-Denis	Kenenisa Bekele (ETH)	Haile Gebrselassie (ETH)	Sileshi Sihine (ETH)
2005 Helsinki	Kenenisa Bekele (ETH)	Sileshi Sihine (ETH)	Moses Mosop (KEN)
2007 Osaka	Kenenisa Bekele (ETH)	Sileshi Sihine (ETH)	Martin Mathathi (KEN)
2009 Berlin	Kenenisa Bekele (ETH)	Zersenay Tadese (ERI)	Moses Ndiema Masai (KEN)
2011 Daegu	Ibrahim Jeilan (ETH)	Mo Farah (GBR)	Imane Merga (ETH)
2013 Moscow	Mo Farah (GBR)	Ibrahim Jeilan (ETH)	Paul Tanui (KEN)
2015 Beijing	Mo Farah (GBR)	Geoffrey Kamworor (KEN)	Paul Tanui (KEN)
2017 London	Mo Farah (GBR)	Joshua Cheptegei (UGA)	Paul Tanui (KEN)
2019 Doha	Joshua Cheptegei (UGA)	Yomif Kejelcha (ETH)	Andamlak Belihu (ETH)
2022 Eugene	Joshua Cheptegei (UGA)	Stanley Mburu (KEN)	Jacob Kiplimo (UGA)
2023 Budapest	Joshua Cheptegei (UGA)	Daniel Ebenyo (KEN)	Selemon Barega (ETH)
2025 Tokyo	Jimmy Gressier (FRA)	Yomif Kejelcha (ETH)	Andreas Almgren (SWE)

==== Medalists by country ====
Rank	Nation	Gold	Silver	Bronze	Total
1	Ethiopia (ETH)	9	7	4	20
2	Kenya (KEN)	3	6	9	18
3	Uganda (UGA)	3	1	1	5
4	Great Britain (GBR)	3	1	0	4
5	Italy (ITA)	1	1	0	2
6	France (FRA)	1	0	0	1
7	East Germany (GDR)	0	1	2	3
7	Morocco (MAR)	0	1	2	3
9	Eritrea (ERI)	0	1	0	1
10	Sweden (SWE)	0	0	1	1

==== Multiple medalists ====
Updated after 2025 championships

Rank	Athlete	Nation	Period	Gold	Silver	Bronze	Total
1	Haile Gebrselassie	Ethiopia (ETH)	1993–2003	4	1	1	6
2	Kenenisa Bekele	Ethiopia (ETH)	2003–2009	4	0	0	4
3	Mo Farah	Great Britain (GBR)	2011–2017	3	1	0	4
3	Joshua Cheptegei	Uganda (UGA)	2017–2023	3	1	0	4
5	Ibrahim Jeilan	Ethiopia (ETH)	2011–2013	1	1	0	2
5	Moses Tanui	Kenya (KEN)	1991–1993	1	1	0	2
7	Paul Tergat	Kenya (KEN)	1995–1999	0	2	1	3
7	Sileshi Sihine	Ethiopia (ETH)	2003–2007	0	2	1	3
9	Yomif Kejelcha	Ethiopia (ETH)	2019–2025	0	2	0	2
10	Paul Tanui	Kenya (KEN)	2013–2017	0	0	3	3
11	Richard Chelimo	Kenya (KEN)	1991–1993	0	1	1	2
11	Khalid Skah	Morocco (MAR)	1991–1995	0	1	1	2
11	Assefa Mezgebu	Ethiopia (ETH)	1999–2001	0	1	1	2
14	Hansjörg Kunze	East Germany (GDR)	1983–1987	0	0	2	2

=== Women ===
Although no Kenyan or Ethiopian won any of the first four editions of the race, they shared all eleven since, with Ethiopia's Tirunesh Dibaba and Kenya's Vivian Cheruiyot the dominant athletes, with three wins, and two wins respectively, until the West African dominance was interrupted by Dutchwoman Sifan Hassan. The next highest ranked nation, China, won all but one if its medals in the now discredited era of 'Ma's Army', the distance running program run by Ma Junren.

Championships	Gold	Silver	Bronze
1987 Rome	Ingrid Kristiansen (NOR)	Yelena Zhupiyeva-Vyazova (URS)	Kathrin Weßel (GDR)
1991 Tokyo	Liz McColgan (GBR)	Zhong Huandi (CHN)	Wang Xiuting (CHN)
1993 Stuttgart	Wang Junxia (CHN)	Zhong Huandi (CHN)	Sally Barsosio (KEN)
1995 Gothenburg	Fernanda Ribeiro (POR)	Derartu Tulu (ETH)	Tegla Loroupe (KEN)
1997 Athens	Sally Barsosio (KEN)	Fernanda Ribeiro (POR)	Masako Chiba (JPN)
1999 Seville	Gete Wami (ETH)	Paula Radcliffe (GBR)	Tegla Loroupe (KEN)
2001 Edmonton	Derartu Tulu (ETH)	Berhane Adere (ETH)	Gete Wami (ETH)
2003 Saint-Denis	Berhane Adere (ETH)	Werknesh Kidane (ETH)	Sun Yingjie (CHN)
2005 Helsinki	Tirunesh Dibaba (ETH)	Berhane Adere (ETH)	Ejegayehu Dibaba (ETH)
2007 Osaka	Tirunesh Dibaba (ETH)	Kara Goucher (USA)	Jo Pavey (GBR)
2009 Berlin	Linet Masai (KEN)	Meselech Melkamu (ETH)	Wude Ayalew (ETH)
2011 Daegu	Vivian Cheruiyot (KEN)	Sally Kipyego (KEN)	Linet Masai (KEN)
2013 Moscow	Tirunesh Dibaba (ETH)	Gladys Cherono Kiprono (KEN)	Belaynesh Oljira (ETH)
2015 Beijing	Vivian Cheruiyot (KEN)	Gelete Burka (ETH)	Emily Infeld (USA)
2017 London	Almaz Ayana (ETH)	Tirunesh Dibaba (ETH)	Agnes Tirop (KEN)
2019 Doha	Sifan Hassan (NED)	Letesenbet Gidey (ETH)	Agnes Tirop (KEN)
2022 Eugene	Letesenbet Gidey (ETH)	Hellen Obiri (KEN)	Margaret Kipkemboi (KEN)
2023 Budapest	Gudaf Tsegay (ETH)	Letesenbet Gidey (ETH)	Ejgayehu Taye (ETH)
2025 Tokyo	Beatrice Chebet (KEN)	Nadia Battocletti (ITA)	Gudaf Tsegay (ETH)

==== Medalists by country ====
Rank	Nation	Gold	Silver	Bronze	Total
1	Ethiopia (ETH)	9	9	6	24
2	Kenya (KEN)	5	3	7	15
3	China (CHN)	1	2	2	5
4	Great Britain (GBR)	1	1	1	3
5	Portugal (POR)	1	1	0	2
6	Netherlands (NED)	1	0	0	1
6	Norway (NOR)	1	0	0	1
8	United States (USA)	0	1	1	2
9	Soviet Union (URS)	0	1	0	1
9	Italy (ITA)	0	1	0	1
11	East Germany (GDR)	0	0	1	1
11	Japan (JPN)	0	0	1	1

==== Multiple medalists ====
Updated after 2025 championships

Rank	Athlete	Nation	Period	Gold	Silver	Bronze	Total
1	Tirunesh Dibaba	Ethiopia (ETH)	2005–2017	3	1	0	4
2	Vivian Cheruiyot	Kenya (KEN)	2011–2015	2	0	0	2
3	Berhane Adere	Ethiopia (ETH)	2001–2005	1	2	0	3
3	Letesenbet Gidey	Ethiopia (ETH)	2019-2023	1	2	0	3
5	Fernanda Ribeiro	Portugal (POR)	1995–1997	1	1	0	2
5	Derartu Tulu	Ethiopia (ETH)	1995–2001	1	1	0	2
5	Linet Masai	Kenya (KEN)	2009–2011	1	1	0	2
8	Sally Barsosio	Kenya (KEN)	1993–1997	1	0	1	2
8	Gete Wami	Ethiopia (ETH)	1999–2001	1	0	1	2
8	Gudaf Tsegay	Ethiopia (ETH)	2023-2025	1	0	1	2
11	Zhong Huandi	China (CHN)	1991–1993	0	2	0	2
12	Tegla Loroupe	Kenya (KEN)	1995–1999	0	0	2	2
12	Agnes Jebet Tirop	Kenya (KEN)	2017-2019	0	0	2	2

== Finishing times ==
Top ten fastest world championships times

Fastest men's times at the World Championships
Rank	Time (sec)	Athlete	Nation	Year	Date
1	26:46.31	Kenenisa Bekele	Ethiopia	2009	2009-08-17
2	26:48.36	Joshua Cheptegei	Uganda	2019	2019-10-06
3	26:49.34	Yomif Kejelcha	Ethiopia	2019	2019-10-06
4	26:49.51	Mo Farah	Great Britain	2017	2017-08-04
5	26:49.57	Kenenisa Bekele	Ethiopia	2003	2003-08-24
6	26:49.94	Joshua Cheptegei	Uganda	2017	2017-08-04
7	26:50.12	Zersenay Tadese	Eritrea	2009	2009-08-17
8	26:50.32	Rhonex Kipruto	Kenya	2019	2019-10-06
9	26:50.60	Paul Tanui	Kenya	2017	2017-08-04
10	26:50.77	Haile Gebrselassie	Ethiopia	2003	2003-08-24

Fastest women's times at the World Championships
Rank	Time (sec)	Athlete	Nation	Year	Date
1	30:04.18	Berhane Adere	Ethiopia	2003	2003-08-23
2	30:07.15	Werknesh Kidane	Ethiopia	2003	2003-08-23
3	30:07.20	Sun Yingjie	China	2003	2003-08-23
4	30:09.94	Letesenbet Gidey	Ethiopia	2022	2022-07-16
5	30:10.02	Hellen Obiri	Kenya	2022	2022-07-16
6	30:10.07	Margaret Kipkemboi	Kenya	2022	2022-07-16
7	30:10.56	Sifan Hassan	Netherlands	2022	2022-07-16
8	30:12.15	Rahel Daniel	Eritrea	2022	2022-07-16
9	30:12.45	Ejgayehu Taye	Ethiopia	2022	2022-07-16
10	30:12.53	Lornah Kiplagat	Netherlands	2003	2003-08-23

== Championship record progression ==
=== Men ===
Men's 10,000 metres World Championships record progression
Time	Athlete	Nation	Year	Round	Date
27:45.54	Fernando Mamede	Portugal (POR)	1983	Heats	7 August
27:38.63	Paul Kipkoech	Kenya (KEN)	1987	Final	29 August
27:29.07	Josephat Machuka	Kenya (KEN)	1995	Heats	5 August
27:12.95	Haile Gebrselassie	Ethiopia (ETH)	1995	Final	8 August
26:49.57	Kenenisa Bekele	Ethiopia (ETH)	2003	Final	24 August
26:46.31	Kenenisa Bekele	Ethiopia (ETH)	2009	Final	17 August

=== Women ===
Women's 10,000 metres World Championships record progression
Time	Athlete	Nation	Year	Round	Date
33:07.92	Kathrin Ullrich	East Germany (GDR)	1987	Heats	31 August
31:05.85	Ingrid Kristiansen	Norway (NOR)	1987	Final	4 September
30:49.30	Wang Junxia	China (CHN)	1993	Final	21 August
30:24.56	Gete Wami	Ethiopia (ETH)	1999	Final	26 August
30:04.18	Berhane Adere	Ethiopia (ETH)	2003	Final	23 August
