= 1986 European Athletics Championships – Women's 10,000 metres =

Women's 10,000 metres at the European Athletics Championships

These are the official results of the Women's 10,000 metres event at the 1986 European Championships in Stuttgart, West Germany. The event was held at Neckarstadion on 30 August 1986.

== Medalists ==
Gold	Ingrid Kristiansen; Norway
Silver	Olga Bondarenko; Soviet Union
Bronze	Ulrike Bruns; East Germany

== Final ==
Rank	Final	Time
	Ingrid Kristiansen (NOR)	30:23.25
	Olga Bondarenko (URS)	30:57.21
	Ulrike Bruns (GDR)	31:19.76
4.	Aurora Cunha (POR)	31:39.35
5.	Svetlana Guskova (URS)	31:42.43
6.	Yelena Zhupiyeva (URS)	31:42.99
7.	Liz Lynch (GBR)	31:49.46
8.	Karolina Szabó (HUN)	31:55.93
9.	Angela Tooby (GBR)	31:56.59
10.	Maria Curatolo (ITA)	32:04.34
11.	Erika Veréb (HUN)	32:15.56
12.	Danièle Kaber (LUX)	32:16.97
13.	Gabriele Veith (GDR)	32:17.22
14.	Midde Hamrin (SWE)	32:18.40
15.	Christine Loiseau (FRA)	32:25.99
16.	Liève Slegers (BEL)	32:26.90
17.	Ľudmila Melicherová (TCH)	32:47.24
18.	Dorthe Rasmussen (DEN)	32:53.04
19.	Evy Palm (SWE)	33:00.96
20.	Kerstin Preßler (FRG)	33:03.63
21.	Grete Kirkeberg (NOR)	33:06.87
22.	Magda Ilands (BEL)	33:10.62
23.	Martine Oppliger (SUI)	33:19.88
24.	Mercedes Calleja (ESP)	33:20.68
25.	Eva Ernström (SWE)	33:26.94
26.	Conceição Ferreira (POR)	33:38.23
27.	Aino Slej (DEN)	34:29.82
	Ria Van Landeghem (BEL)	DNF

== Participation ==
According to an unofficial count, 28 athletes from 16 countries participated in the event.

- Belgium (3)
- Czechoslovakia (1)
- Denmark (2)
- East Germany (2)
- France (1)
- Hungary (2)
- Italy (1)
- Luxembourg (1)
- Norway (2)
- Portugal (2)
- Soviet Union (3)
- Spain (1)
- Sweden (3)
- Switzerland (1)
- United Kingdom (2)
- West Germany (1)

== See also ==
- 1987 Women's World Championships 10,000 metres (Rome)
- 1988 Women's Olympic 10,000 metres (Seoul)
- 1990 Women's European Championships 10,000 metres (Split)
