= Angela Tooby =

British former long-distance runner (born 1960)

Personal information
- Nationality: British (Welsh)
- Born: 24 October 1960 (age 65) Woolhope, England
- Height: 166 cm (5 ft 5 in)
- Weight: 49 kg (108 lb)

Sport
- Sport: Athletics
- Event: long distance
- Club: Cardiff AAC
Medal record
Women's Athletics
Representing Wales
Commonwealth Games
Bronze medal – third place	1986 Edinburgh	10,000 m
Representing Great Britain
World Cross Country Championships
Silver medal – second place	1988 Auckland	Individual
Silver medal – second place	1988 Auckland	Team

Angela Rosemary Tooby-Smith (née Tooby; born 24 October 1960) is a British former long-distance runner. She won a silver medal behind Ingrid Kristiansen at the 1988 IAAF World Cross Country Championships and a bronze medal in the 10,000 metres at the 1986 Commonwealth Games. She also finished ninth in the 10,000 metres final at the 1987 World Championships and competed at the 1988 Seoul Olympics. She is the twin sister of fellow athlete Susan Tooby.

== Biography ==
Born in Woolhope, Herefordshire, England, Tooby had her first successes in athletics in cross country running competitions. She competed at national level, winning the Welsh Cross-country Championships four times in 1984–1987 She ran at the IAAF World Cross Country Championships in 1984, finishing in 8th position overall, and improved the following year by taking sixth place at the 1985 race. She had also begun to make an impact on the track, recording the fourth fastest 5000 metres run of 1984.

She was the 10,000 metres bronze medallist at the 1986 Commonwealth Games, and finished ninth in the 10,000 metres race at the European Athletics Championships that year. She ran the second-fastest 5000 m run of 1987 (after Liz McColgan). In the 10,000 m race at the 1987 World Championships in Athletics, she finished ninth with a personal best of 31:55.30.

The 1988 season was Tooby's most successful: she became the British 10,000 metres champion after winning the British AAA Championships title at the 1988 AAA Championships, became the UK Cross-country Champion and, following a win at the prestigious Almond Blossom Cross Country race, she won the silver medal at the 1988 IAAF World Cross Country Championships, behind Ingrid Kristiansen, and led the British women to a team silver medal as well. She attended her first Olympics soon after, but in the women's 10,000 metres at the 1988 Seoul Games, she was eliminated in the heats (following a stress fracture of the spine). Her compatriot Liz McColgan took the silver.

Tooby attended Aberystwyth University between 1979 and 1983 studying geography and a PGCE in Geography & PE. She is married to Professor Andy Smith. Her twin sister Susan Tooby, also competed at the 1988 Olympics.

== International competitions ==
Year	Competition	Venue	Position	Event	Notes
Representing Great Britain and Wales
1984	World Cross Country Championships	New York, United States	8th	5 km	16:18
1985	World Cross Country Championships	Lisbon, Portugal	6th	5 km	15:40
1986	Commonwealth Games	Edinburgh, Scotland	3rd	10,000 m	32:25.38
1986	European Championships	Stuttgart, West Germany	9th	10,000 m	31:56.59
1987	World Championships	Rome, Italy	9th	10,000 m	31:55.30
1988	World Cross Country Championships	Auckland, New Zealand	2nd	6 km	19:23
1988	Olympic Games	Seoul, South Korea	29th (heats)	10,000 m	33:26.57
