= Ana Isabel Alonso =

Spanish long-distance runner

Ana Isabel Alonso Nieto (born 16 August 1963 in Villaherreros, Palencia) is a former long-distance runner from Spain, who represented her native country in three Summer Olympics: 1988, 1996 and 2000. Her best finish came at her Olympic debut in Seoul, South Korea, where Alonso ended up in 25th place in the women's 10.000 metres race. In Atlanta, Georgia and Sydney, Australia she ran the marathon, finishing in 49th (2:44:12) and 30th (2:36.45) place. In 2000, she won the Rotterdam Marathon. She is a one-time national champion in the women's 5.000 metres and was the winner of the second edition of the Cross Internacional de Soria meeting. She also won the Cross Internacional de Venta de Baños three times, more than any other female athlete.

== Achievements ==
Year	Competition	Venue	Position	Event	Notes
Representing Spain
1987	World Championships	Rome, Italy	19th	10,000 m	33:20.65
1987	Mediterranean Games	Latakia, Syria	–	3000 m	DNF
1988	Olympic Games	Seoul, South Korea	25th	10,000 m	32:40.50
1993	World Championships	Stuttgart, Germany	17th	Marathon	2:42:53
1994	European Championships	Helsinki, Finland	14th	Marathon	2:37.36
1996	Olympic Games	Atlanta, United States	49th	Marathon	2:44:12
1998	European Championships	Budapest, Hungary	—	Marathon	DNF
2000	Rotterdam Marathon	Rotterdam, Netherlands	1st	Marathon	2:30:21
2000	Olympic Games	Sydney, Australia	30th	Marathon	2:36:45
