= Mija =

Mija may refer to:

- Mija Aleksić (1923–1995), a Serbian actor
- Mija Mare, a tributary of the river Jieț in Romania
- Mija Martina (born 1984), a singer from Bosnia and Herzegovina
- Mija Mică, a tributary of the river Jieț in Romania
- Mija (DJ) (born 1992), a DJ from Phoenix
- Mija, a village in I. L. Caragiale Commune, Dâmbovița County, Romania

== See also ==
- Mi-ja, Korean given name
