= Henry Hawtrey =

British athlete (1882–1961)

Personal information
- Born: 29 June 1882 Southampton, England
- Died: 16 November 1961 (aged 79) Aldershot, England

Sport
- Sport: Athletics
- Event: middle-distance
- Club: London Athletic Club; Thames Hare and Hounds, Roehampton
Medal record
Men's athletics
Representing Great Britain
Intercalated Games
Gold medal – first place	1906 Athens	5 miles

Henry Courtenay Hawtrey CMG DSO (29 June 1882 – 16 November 1961) was a British track and field athlete, winner of 5 miles (8.0 km) run at the 1906 Summer Olympics.

== Biography ==
Hawtrey born in Southampton, finished second behind Joseph Binks in the AAA Championships 1 mile event at the 1902 AAA Championships.

Before the 1906 Olympic Games, the British were the leading force in long-distance running. Although their long-distance runner Alfred Shrubb had turned to professional just before the 1906 "intercalated" Olympics of, the Britons sent a strong team to Athens.

Henry Hawtrey took the lead after 2 miles (3.2 km) and won easily, beating second-placed runner John Svanberg from Sweden by 50 yards (46 m). The Britons used good teamwork to aid Hawtrey to win, as third-placed Irishman John Daly was disqualified because he blocked the Swedish runner's way several times.

Hawtrey served with the Royal Engineers in the First World War. He was awarded the Distinguished Service Order and made a Companion of the Order of St Michael and St George in the 1918 New Year Honours.

He died in 1961 in Aldershot.
