= Wang Qinghuan =

Chinese long-distance runner

Personal information
- Nationality: Chinese
- Born: 22 December 1966 (age 59)

Sport
- Sport: Long-distance running
- Event: 10,000 metres

Wang Qinghuan (born 22 December 1966) is a Chinese long-distance runner. She competed in the women's 10,000 metres at the 1988 Summer Olympics.
