= 1989 IAAF World Indoor Championships – Women's 3000 metres =

The women's 3000 metres event at the 1989 IAAF World Indoor Championships was held at the Budapest Sportcsarnok in Budapest on 4 March.

== Results ==
Rank	Name	Nationality	Time	Notes
1st place, gold medalist(s)	Elly van Hulst	Netherlands	8:33.82	WR, CR
2nd place, silver medalist(s)	Liz McColgan	Great Britain	8:34.80	NR
3rd place, bronze medalist(s)	Margareta Keszeg	Romania	8:48.70	PB
4	Vera Michallek	West Germany	8:49.66	
5	Nicky Morris	Great Britain	8:53.52	PB
6	Lyudmila Borisova	Soviet Union	9:04.75	PB
7	Zita Ágoston	Hungary	9:18.72	
	Fatima Aouam	Morocco	DNS	
