= Mi-ja =

- Hangul: 미자
- RR: Mija
- MR: Mija

Mi-ja is a Korean given name. Typically, "ja" is written with the hanja meaning "child" (子). Names ending with this hanja, such as Young-ja and Jeong-ja, were popular when Korea was under Japanese rule, but declined in popularity afterwards.

People with this name include:

- Lee Mi-ja (born 1941), South Korean trot singer
- Son Mi-ja (born 1944), stage name Yoon Jeong-hee, South Korean actress
- Son Mi-ja (born 1961), stage name Geum Bo-ra, South Korean actress
- Lee Mi-ja (basketball) (born 1963), South Korean basketball player
- Kim Mi-ja (born 1967), South Korean sprint canoer
- Jeong Mi-ja (born 1970), South Korean long-distance runner who competed at the 1988 Summer Olympics
- Oh Mi-ja (born 1970), South Korean long-distance runner who competed at the 1996 and 2000 Summer Olympics

Fictional characters with this name include:

- Yun Mija, in 2011 Thai martial arts film The Kick
- Mija, in 2017 South Korean adventure film Okja

== See also ==
- List of Korean given names
