= Lieve Slegers =

Belgian long-distance runner

Lieve Slegers (born 6 April 1965 in Turnhout, Flanders) is a former long-distance runner from Belgium, who won the Rotterdam Marathon on 28 April 1996 clocking 2:28:06. She represented her native country at the 1988 Summer Olympics in the women's 10,000 metres, where she was eliminated in the qualifying heats. Slegers also competed at the 1992 Summer Olympics. She was the 1995 winner of the 20 km of Brussels.

She was also a cross country runner – Slegers won the Cross Internacional de Venta de Baños in 1989. She was successful domestically, winning the Lotto Cross Cup series in 1991–92 and 1994–95. She also won the 1992 Eurocross competition in neighbouring Luxembourg.

== International competitions ==
Year	Competition	Venue	Position	Event	Notes
Representing Belgium
1986	European Championships	Stuttgart, West Germany	16th	10,000 m	32:26.90
1987	World Championships	Rome, Italy	22nd (h)	10,000 m	33:48.91
1988	World Cross Country Championships	Auckland, New Zealand	8th	6 km	19:44
1988	Olympic Games	Seoul, South Korea	33rd (h)	10,000 m	33:51.36
1990	World Cross Country Championships	Aix-les-Bains, France	39th	6 km	20:15
1990	European Championships	Split, Yugoslavia	10th	10,000 m	32:29.46
1991	World Cross Country Championships	Antwerp, Belgium	35th	6.4 km	21:31
1991	World Championships	Tokyo, Japan	28th (h)	10,000 m	32:31.55
1992	World Cross Country Championships	Boston, United States	14th	6.4 km	21:49
1992	Olympic Games	Barcelona, Spain	15th	10,00 m	32:14.17
1994	European Cross Country Championships	Alnwick, United Kingdom	8th	4.5 km	14.49
1995	World Cross Country Championships	Durham, United Kingdom	63rd	6.5 km	21:51
1995	World Championships	Gothenburg, Sweden	11th	10,000 m	32:10.59
1996	European Cross Country Championships	Charleroi, Belgium	18th	4.5 km	17:53
Marathons
1995	New York City Marathon	New York City, United States	3rd	Marathon	2:32:08
1996	Rotterdam Marathon	Rotterdam, Netherlands	1st	Marathon	2:28:06
1997	Rotterdam Marathon	Rotterdam, Netherlands	4th	Marathon	2:34:15
1998	London Marathon	London, United Kingdom	19th	Marathon	2:43:16
1999	Antwerp Marathon	Antwerp, Belgium	1st	Marathon	2:34:23
1999	Chicago Marathon	Chicago, United States	14th	Marathon	2:36:07

Notes:

- Results with (h) indicates overall position in qualifying heats.
- Slegers qualified for the 1987 World Championship final but failed to finish.
