= Stirling Scottish Marathon =

- Date: May
- Location: Stirling, UK
- Event type: Road
- Distance: Marathon Half Marathon
- Established: 2017
- Organizer: Classic Run Events (2021-), Great Run (2017-2019)
- Course records: 2:25:01 (2017)
- Website: www.thestirlingmarathon.co.uk

The Stirling Scottish Marathon, previously named the Great Stirling Run between 2018 and 2019, is a long-distance running event held in Stirling, Scotland. The first event was held on 21 May 2017, with the subsequent event taking place on 29 April 2018 when the event introduced a half marathon alongside the existing marathon. After the race cancellation in 2020, the event reverts to its former name and has been scheduled for 15th of May 2022.

== Overview ==
The event was formerly organised by the Great Run Company who decided not to renew their contract for the marathon event upon the conclusion of an initial three-year deal. From 2020, new backers Classic Run Events took over the running of the event.

Directors from Classic Run Events, who organise a number of running events at various venues throughout UK, were involved in marketing the original Stirling Scottish Marathon with the aim of it becoming the leading marathon in Scotland within three years.

== Course ==
The marathon course takes in a route through much of rural Stirlingshire. Starting in the city centre, the route covers Doune, Dunblane and Bridge of Allan before completing a circuit of the University of Stirling, past the Wallace Monument and along Hillfoots Road, through Blairlogie at the foot of the imposing Dumyat cliff, then back into the city centre. In 2017, the event started in Blair Drummond Safari Park. On the official website, the marathon course is being promoted as one of the most scenic and picturesque in the world.

The half marathon course starts in the city centre and follows the reverse of the marathon route, including the city centre section before picking up the picturesque Blairlogie and Dumyat section of the course, heading back into the city alongside the marathon runners.

Both events feature a city-centre finish in King's Park.

== Marathon Winners ==
Date	Male	Nationality	Time	Female	Nationality	Time	Finishers
28 Apr 2019	Michael Wright	Scotland	2:29:32	Jennifer Wetton	Scotland	2:56:05	1140
29 Apr 2018	Michael Wright	Scotland	2:29:19	Alison McGill	Scotland	3:02:35	1835
21 May 2017	Andrew Lemoncello	Scotland	2:25:01	Lesley Pirie	Scotland	2:47:36	4315

== Half Marathon Winners ==
Date	Male	Nationality	Time	Female	Nationality	Time	Finishers
28 Apr 2019	Matthew Sutherland	Scotland	1:09:59	Fiona Matheson	Scotland	1:22:48	2432
29 Apr 2018	Michael Crawley	Scotland	1:09:33	Sarah Brown	Scotland	1:26:58	2545

== 2020 Event ==
This event has been cancelled for 2020 due to the COVID-19 pandemic. The event will now take place on 9 May 2021.

It was previously announced on 9 October 2019 at a press conference attended by Callum Hawkins (who had flown in from Doha after finishing 4th in the World Athletics Championships Marathon) that the Stirling Scottish Marathon would be returning in 2020 Organised by Classic Run Events, the new look marathon was planned to take place on 11 October 2020. The weekend festival of running plan included a half marathon and a corporate relay (team of four) on the same day, with a 5km, Family Mile and Junior 3km Run events plus Sportside "Come and Try" sports arena organised on the Saturday. A "Marathon Expo" was to be held on 9 and 10 October in the Albert Halls, Stirling.

== 2019 Event ==
The event was renamed Simplyhealth Great Stirling Run, forming part of the Great Run Series of events and took place on 28 April 2019. More than 5000 runners signed up for the race and the Marathon were won by Michael Wright of Central AC, who retained his title as champion of the Simplyhealth Great Stirling Run marathon in a time of 2.29.32, with Kevin Wood of Fife AC second in 2.30.53 and Donnie Macdonald of Inverness Harriers AAC in 2.34.21. For women, Jennifer Wetton, also of Central AC was the first woman home in 2.56.05, Lesley Hansen of Inverness Harriers AAC was second in 3.04.50 and Rhona Van Rensburgh of Fife AC third with 3.09.55.

The Simplyhealth Great Stirling Run Half Marathon was won by Matthew Sutherland in 69.59, with Lewis Millar second in 73.36 and Martin Brown of Kilmarnock Harriers & AC was third in 73.48. For women, Fiona Matheson of Falkirk Victoria Harriers with 82.48, Sarah Stephen was second in 87.37 followed by Rachael Adamson third in 89.39

== 2018 Event ==
Following the success of the 2017 event, the event organisers listened to feedback from runners and revealed that the 2018 event would feature a new course to take place a month earlier than the 2017 edition. The 2018 Stirling Scottish Marathon was launched by 2016 Olympic marathon runner Derek Hawkins. Outlander star Sam Heughan took part in the marathon as part of his My Peak Challenge charity fundraising efforts in 2018, breaking his personal best in the process. A half marathon distance was added.

== 2017 Event ==
More than 6,500 runners signed up for the first-ever Stirling Scottish marathon where the podium placings were dominated by Scots. Scottish Olympian Andrew Lemoncello from Fife won the race in a time of 2.25.01, followed by two runners from the same Scottish club in Cambuslang: Ian Reid in 2:29:44 and Robert Gilroy in 2:34:17. Fellow Scot Lesley Pirie was the first female to finish in a time of 2:47:36, followed by Jill Smylie in 2:57:06 with Juliet Champion from south of the border completing the trio female sub-3-hour standard in 2:58:38. Former Olympian athletes Liz McColgan and Zola Budd took part in the marathon, with Zola over the line first in 3.12.24, finishing as ninth female, and Liz not far behind in 3.18.33. Prior to her re-election as a UK MP in May 2017 and becoming the first female leader of the Liberal Democrats (UK) in September 2019, anti-Brexiteer and gender-equality proponent, Jo Swinson participated in this inaugural marathon, running on behalf of two health charities and finishing 396th from a field of over 1600 females, in a creditable time of 4:08:06.
