= Jeong Mi-ja =

South Korean long-distance runner

Personal information
- Nationality: South Korean
- Born: 8 March 1970 (age 56)

Sport
- Sport: Long-distance running
- Event: 10,000 metres

Jeong Mi-ja (born 8 March 1970) is a South Korean long-distance runner. She competed in the women's 10,000 metres at the 1988 Summer Olympics.

Jeong set the record for the fastest second leg at the 4th Kolon Intersection Marathon Ekiden, running it in 27:31.
