= Rose Lamb =

Painter (1843 - 1927)

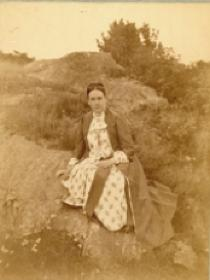
- Born: 1843; Boston
- Died: 1927 (aged 83–84)
- Occupation: Artist

Rosanna "Rose" Duncan Lamb (1843 – 1927) was an American portrait painter.

Rose Lamb was born in 1843 in Boston to a prominent family.

Lamb was a student of William Morris Hunt in the 1870s. She exhibited infrequently, but her portraits were in high demand from members of the Boston elite and she particularly excelled at painting children. She made several trips to Europe and beginning in 1884 she was a drawing instructor at the South Boston School of Art. Around 1900, she gave up painting after an illness.

She was friends with the poet Celia Thaxter and after Thaxter's death, she and Annie Adams Fields edited and published Thaxter's letters.

Her papers are at the Archives of American Art.
