= 1990 European Athletics Championships – Women's 10,000 metres =

Women's 10,000 metres at the European Athletics Championships

These are the official results of the Women's 10,000 metres event at the 1990 European Championships in Split, Yugoslavia. The final was held on 31 August 1990.

== Medalists ==
Gold	Yelena Romanova; Soviet Union
Silver	Kathrin Ullrich; East Germany
Bronze	Annette Sergent; France

== Final ==
Rank	Final	Time
	Yelena Romanova (URS)	31:46.83
	Kathrin Ullrich (GDR)	31:47.70
	Annette Sergent (FRA)	31:51.68
4.	Midde Hamrin (SWE)	31:58.25
5.	Nadia Dandolo (ITA)	32:02.37
6.	Nadezhda Galyamova (URS)	32:03.07
7.	Wanda Panfil (POL)	32:06.01
8.	Jill Hunter (GBR)	32:10.15
9.	Aurora Cunha (POR)	32:15.83
10.	Liève Slegers (BEL)	32:29.46
11.	Kerstin Preßler (FRG)	32:42.96
12.	Julie Holland (GBR)	32:47.78
13.	Viorica Ghican (ROM)	32:55.18
14.	Marjan Freriks (NED)	33:04.95
15.	Angie Pain (GBR)	33:06.09
16.	Birgit Jerschabek (GDR)	33:08.11
17.	Isabella Moretti (SUI)	33:22.66
18.	Andri Avraam (CYP)	33:22.81
19.	Silva Rožič-Vivod (YUG)	33:27.04
20.	Rosario Murcia (FRA)	33:44.44
21.	Carlien Harms (NED)	34:01.25
22.	Martha Ernstdóttir (ISL)	34:17.27
—	Yelena Tolstoguzova (URS)	DNF
—	Galina Goranova (BUL)	DNF
—	Fernanda Ribeiro (POR)	DNF
—	Zita Ágoston (HUN)	DNF
—	Päivi Tikkanen (FIN)	DNF

== Participation ==
According to an unofficial count, 27 athletes from 19 countries participated in the event.

- Belgium (1)
- Bulgaria (1)
- Cyprus (1)
- East Germany (2)
- Finland (1)
- France (2)
- Hungary (1)
- Iceland (1)
- Italy (1)
- Netherlands (2)
- Poland (1)
- Portugal (2)
- Romania (1)
- Soviet Union (3)
- Sweden (1)
- Switzerland (1)
- United Kingdom (3)
- West Germany (1)
- Yugoslavia (1)

== See also ==
- 1988 Women's Olympic 10,000 metres (Seoul)
- 1991 Women's World Championships 10,000 metres (Tokyo)
- 1992 Women's Olympic 10,000 metres (Barcelona)
