= Ľudmila Melicherová =

Slovak long-distance runner

Ľudmila Melicherová (born June 6, 1964, in Fiľakovo, Banská Bystrica Region) is a Slovak retired female long-distance runner who represented Czechoslovakia at the 1988 Summer Olympics in the women's marathon.

She set her personal best (2:33:19) in the classic distance on April 22, 1990, winning the Vienna City Marathon. Her mark still stands as the Slovak record. She won the Vienna race again in 1991 in a time of 2:37:14 hours. Her last major marathon win was the Košice Peace Marathon in 1994 in a time of 2:40:27.

== International competitions ==
Year	Competition	Venue	Position	Event	Notes
Representing Czechoslovakia
1986	European Championships	Stuttgart, West Germany	17th	10,000 m	32:47.24
1988	Olympic Games	Seoul, South Korea	45th	Marathon	2:43:56
1991	World Championships	Tokyo, Japan	—	Marathon	DNF
