= Sue French-Lee =

Canadian long-distance runner

Sue Lee
Personal information
- Full name: Susan Lee
- Nationality: Canadian
- Born: 7 May 1960 (age 66)

Sport
- Sport: Long-distance running
- Events: 3000 metres, 10,000 metres

Susan Lee (née French, born 7 May 1960) is a Canadian former long-distance runner. She competed in the 3000 metres at the 1984 Los Angeles Olympics and went on to finish eighth in the 10,000 metres final at the 1988 Seoul Olympics. She also competed at the Commonwealth Games in 1986 and 1990.

== International competitions ==
Year	Competition	Venue	Position	Event	Notes
Representing Canada
1984	Olympic Games	Los Angeles, United States	22nd (h)	3000 m	9:24.66
1986	Commonwealth Games	Edinburgh, United Kingdom	5th	10,000 m	32:30.75
1987	Pan American Games	Indianapolis, United States	4th	10,000 m	
1987	World Championships	Rome, Italy	25th (h)	10,000 m	34:14.92
1988	Olympic Games	Seoul, South Korea	8th	10,000 m	31:50.51
1990	Commonwealth Games	Auckland, New Zealand	10th	10,000 m	33:22.63
(h) Indicates overall position in qualifying heats
