= Midde Hamrin =

Swedish long-distance runner

Midde Hamrin (born Ingrid Marie-Louise Hamrin on 19 April 1957) is a Swedish athlete, competing in the long-distance running events.

She played basketball with the Högsbo Division I Basketball Club in Gothenburg, Sweden from 1975 to 1978. In 1977, she spent the spring and summer in Los Angeles with American Högsbo basketball coach, Richard Wohlstadter. She began her track career there, training at the UCLA track and along the famous grass on San Vicente Blvd. She later received a scholarship to Lamar University in Texas where she played varsity basketball and ran track. It was there she met Andy Senorski, the track coach at Lamar. They later married, moved to Sweden, and had two children.

== Achievements ==
Year	Competition	Venue	Position	Event	Notes
Representing Sweden
1982	European Championships	Athens, Greece	7th	Marathon	2:42:14
1983	World Championships	Helsinki, Finland	43rd	Marathon	2:52:53
1984	Olympic Games	Los Angeles, United States	18th	Marathon	2:36:41
1986	European Championships	Stuttgart, West Germany	14th	10,000 m	32:18.40
1990	Stockholm Marathon	Stockholm, Sweden	1st	Marathon	2:37:07
1990	European Championships	Split, Yugoslavia	4th	10,000 m	31:58.25
1991	Stockholm Marathon	Stockholm, Sweden	1st	Marathon	2:36:15
1991	Chicago Marathon	Chicago, United States	1st	Marathon	2:36:21
