= Kathrin Weßel =

German long-distance runner

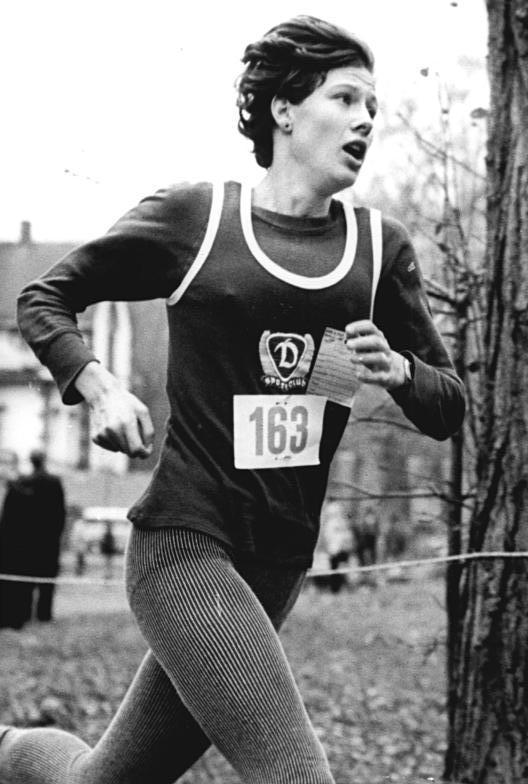
- Ullrich winning the Fritz Weineck memorial cross country race in Halle in 1986
Medal record
Women's athletics
Representing East Germany
World Championships
Bronze medal – third place	1987 Rome	10,000 m
European Championships
Silver medal – second place	1990 Split	10,000 m

Kathrin Wessel (née Ullrich; born 14 August 1967) is a retired German long-distance runner who specialized in the 10,000 metres. She was the 1987 World Championship bronze medallist, the 1990 European Championship silver medallist, and won the 1989 World Cup title. She also competed at three Olympic Games (Seoul 1988, Barcelona 1992, and Atlanta 1996).

== Biography ==
Wessel was born in Annaberg-Buchholz, Saxony, East Germany and competed for the club SV Dynamo. She first came to international prominence in 1987, as Kathrin Ullrich, when she won the European Cup 10,000 metres in only her second attempt at the distance. The 1987 season culminated in her winning a bronze medal at the World Championships in Rome, finishing ahead of Olga Bondarenko and Liz McColgan, who placed fourth and fifth respectively.

In the 1988 Olympic final in Seoul, she followed the early break by world record holder Ingrid Kristiansen, only to find herself with a 30 metres lead when Kristiansen dropped out after six laps due to injury. She would eventually finish fourth.

Wessel had one of her biggest career wins in 1989, at the World Cup in Barcelona, when she outkicked Kristiansen in the final 200 metres to win comfortably.

During the early 1990s, Wessel would remain one of the best 10 km runners in the world. At the 1990 European Championships, she won the silver medal behind Yelena Romanova. In 1991, she ran her best ever time of 31:03, which put her fourth on the all-time list behind Kristiansen, McColgan, and Bondarenko. She ended the 1991 season by finishing fourth at the World Championships in Tokyo, won by McColgan.

In 1992, now competing as Kathrin Wessel, she looked set to be a major medal contender at the 1992 Olympics, when she won the German title in June of that year in 31:20, just ahead of Uta Pippig, but in Barcelona she failed to finish her qualifying heat. From this point, she would cease to be a major force on the world stage, although she did manage fourth place at the 1994 European Championships and competed in her third and final Olympics in 1996.

Late in her career, she moved up in distance to the Marathon, achieving her best time of 2:28:31, in 2001 at the Berlin Marathon.

== Achievements ==
Year	Competition	Venue	Position	Event	Notes
Representing East Germany
1987	European Cup	Prague, Czechoslovakia	1st	10,000 m	32:42.05
1987	World Championships	Rome, Italy	3rd	10,000 m	31:11.34
1988	Olympic Games	Seoul, South Korea	4th	10,000 m	31:29.27
1989	European Cup	Gateshead, United Kingdom	1st	10,000m	32:17.88
1989	World Cup	Barcelona, Spain	1st	10,000 m	31:33.92
1990	European Championships	Split, Yugoslavia	2nd	10,000 m	31.47.70
Representing Germany
1991	European Cup	Frankfurt, Germany	1st	10,000 m	31:03.62
1991	World Championships	Tokyo, Japan	4th	10,000 m	31.38.96
1992	Olympic Games	Barcelona, Spain	heats	10,000 m	DNF
1993	World Championships	Stuttgart, Germany	13th	10,000 m	32:27.38
1994	European Cup	Birmingham, United Kingdom	1st	10,000 m	32:26.85
1994	European Championships	Helsinki, Finland	4th	10,000 m	31:38.75
1995	World Championships	Gothenburg, Sweden	10th	10,000 m	31:55.04
1996	European Cup	Madrid, Spain	1st	5000 m	15:40.36
1996	Olympic Games	Atlanta, United States	heats	10,000 m	33:31.67

=== Personal bests ===
- 3000 metres⁣ – 8:44.81 min (1988)
- 5000 metres⁣ – 14:58.71 min (1991)
- 10,000 metres⁣ – 31:03.62 min (1991)
- Half marathon⁣ – 1:11:09 hrs (2001)
- Marathon⁣ – 2:28:27 hrs (2001)

Sporting positions
Preceded by (Scotland) Liz McColgan	Women's 5.000m Best Year Performance; 1989	Succeeded by (Soviet Union) Yelena Romanova
