= Paul Kipkoech =

Kenyan long-distance runner

Personal information
- Nationality: Kenya
- Born: Paul Kipkoech; January 6, 1963 Kapsabet, Kenya Colony
- Died: March 16, 1995 (aged 32) Kenya

Sport
- Sport: Long distance
- Coached by: Carol Santa
Medal record
Men's athletics
Representing Kenya
African Championships
Silver medal – second place	1985 Cairo	5000 m
Bronze medal – third place	1985 Cairo	10,000 m

Paul Kipkoech (January 6, 1963 – March 16, 1995) was a Kenyan long-distance runner who specialized in the 10,000 metres and cross-country running. He became world champion over 10,000 m in 1987.

Kipkoech was born in Kapsabet. In 1986 he ran the 3000 metres in 7:39.38 minutes, which was the third best time in the world that season, only behind Saïd Aouita and Sydney Maree.

He retired in 1988 due to illness. He died in 1995 at an Eldoret hospital aged only 32.

== International competitions ==
Representing Kenya
Year	Competition	Venue	Position	Event	Notes
1983	World Championships	Helsinki, Finland	9th	5000 m	
1984	Olympic Games	Los Angeles, United States	5th	5000 m	
1985	World Cross Country Championships	Lisbon, Portugal	2nd	Long race	
1987	World Cross Country Championships	Warsaw, Poland	2nd	Long race	
1987	World Championships	Rome, Italy	1st	10,000 m	
1987	All-Africa Games	Nairobi, Kenya	2nd	5000 m	
1987	All-Africa Games	Nairobi, Kenya	1st	10,000 m	
1988	World Cross Country Championships	Auckland, New Zealand	2nd	Long race	

== See also ==
- List of male middle-distance runners
- List of World Athletics Championships medalists (men)
- List of African Games medalists in athletics (men)
- 10,000 metres at the World Championships in Athletics
- Kenya at the World Athletics Championships
