= Villaherreros =

Coordinates: 42°23′N 4°27′W

- municipality
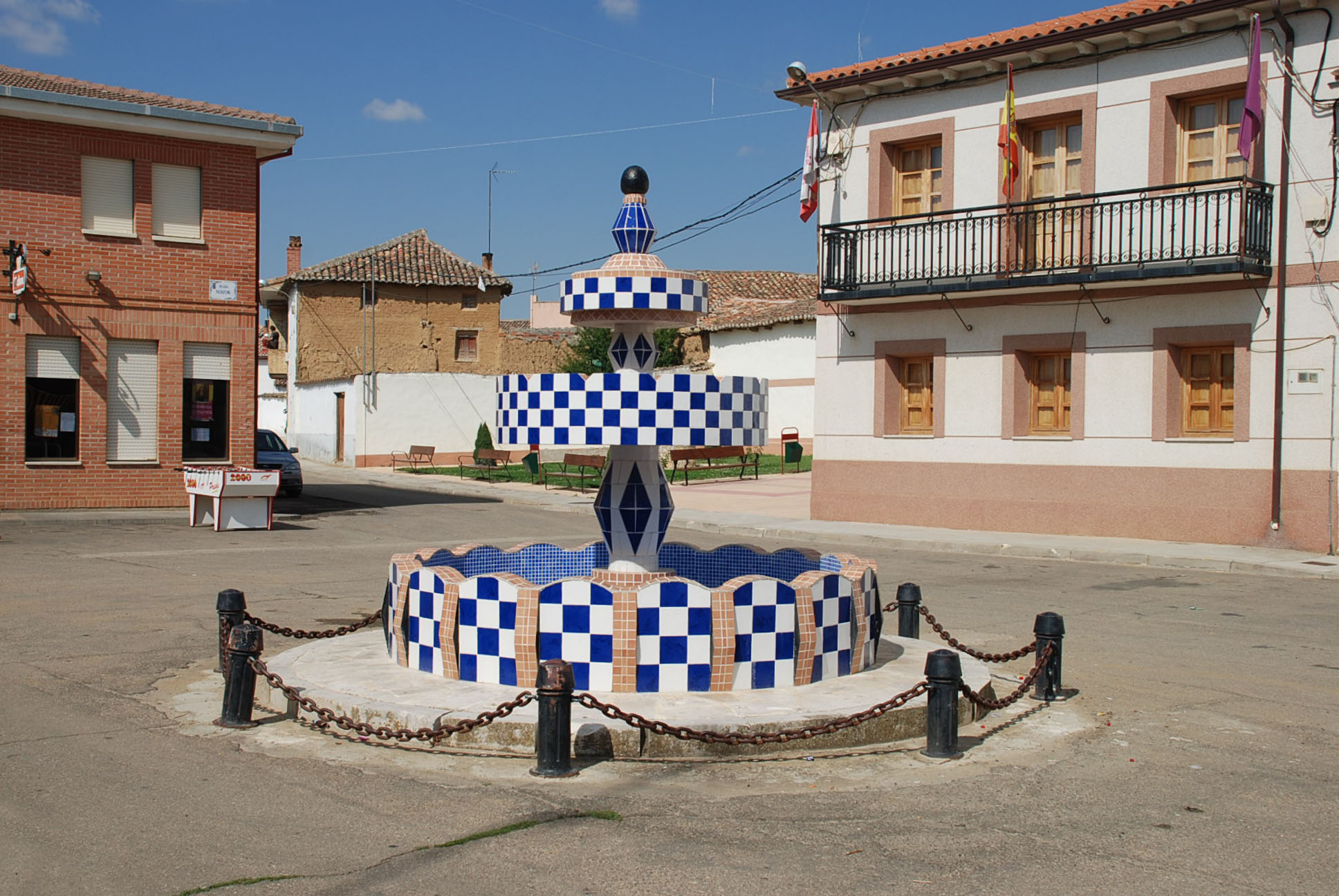

- Flag Coat of arms
- Interactive map of Villaherreros
- Country: Spain
- Autonomous community: Castile and León
- Province: Palencia

Area
  - Total: 40 km^{2} (15 sq mi)

Population (2025-01-01)
  - Total: 211
  - Density: 5.3/km^{2} (14/sq mi)
- Time zone: UTC+1 (CET)
  - Summer (DST): UTC+2 (CEST)
- Website: Official website

Villaherreros is a municipality located in the province of Palencia, Castile and León, Spain. According to the 2004 census (INE), the municipality has a total population of 252 inhabitants.
