= Erika Fazekas-Veréb =

Hungarian long-distance runner

Personal information
- Nationality: Hungarian
- Born: 23 October 1963 (age 62)

Sport
- Sport: Long-distance running
- Event: 10,000 metres

Erika Fazekas-Veréb (born 23 October 1963) is a Hungarian long-distance runner. She competed in the women's 10,000 metres at the 1988 Summer Olympics.
