= Martine Oppliger-Bouchonneau =

Swiss long-distance runner

Personal information
- Nationality: Swiss
- Born: 19 October 1957 (age 68)

Sport
- Sport: Long-distance running
- Event: 10,000 metres

Martine Oppliger-Bouchonneau (born 19 October 1957) is a Swiss long-distance runner. She competed in the women's 10,000 metres at the 1988 Summer Olympics.
