= Olena Zhupiyeva-Vyazova =

Ukrainian track and field athlete

Medal record

Women's athletics

Representing Soviet Union

Olympic Games
Bronze medal – third place	1988 Seoul	10000 m

World Championships
Silver medal – second place	1987 Rome	10000 m

Olena Zhupiieva-Viazova or Olena Zhupiyeva-Vyazova or Yelena Zhupiyeva-Vyazova, née Yelena Zhupiyeva, (Russian: Елена Жупиева-Вязова, Ukrainian: Олена Жупієва-В'язова; born 18 April 1960) is a retired track and field athlete from Ukraine, who competed mainly in the 10,000 metres. Competing for the Soviet Union as Yelena Zhupiyeva, she won a silver medal in the 10,000 m at the 1987 World Championships in Rome and a bronze medal in the 10,000m at the 1988 Seoul Olympics. As Yelena Vyazova, she won the 1992 CIS Athletics Championships 10,000 m title, and competed at the 1992 Barcelona Olympics.

== International competitions ==
Year	Competition	Venue	Position	Event	Notes
Representing the Soviet Union
1986	European Championships	Stuttgart, West Germany	6th	3000 m	8.40.74
1986	European Championships	Stuttgart, West Germany	6th	10,000 m	31:42.99
1987	World Championships	Rome, Italy	2nd	10,000 m	31:09.40
1988	Olympic Games	Seoul, South Korea	3rd	10,000 m	31:19.82
Representing the Unified Team
1992	Olympic Games	Barcelona, Spain	heats	10,000 m	DNF
1992	World Cup	Havana, Cuba	4th	10,000 m	33.59.99
Representing Ukraine
1996	European Cup	Madrid, Spain	4th	5000 m	15:52.45

== See also ==
- List of Olympic medalists in athletics (women)
- List of 1988 Summer Olympics medal winners
- List of World Athletics Championships medalists (women)
- 10,000 metres at the Olympics
- 10,000 metres at the World Championships in Athletics
- List of 5000 metres national champions (women)
