= Athletics at the 1988 Summer Olympics – Women's 10,000 metres =

Women's 10,000 metres at the Games of the XXIV Olympiad
- Venue: Olympic Stadium
- Dates: 26 September 1988 (heats); 30 September 1988 (final)
- Competitors: 42 from 31 nations
- Winning time: 31:05.20 OR

Medalists
1st place, gold medalist(s)		Olga Bondarenko; Soviet Union
2nd place, silver medalist(s)		Liz McColgan; Great Britain
3rd place, bronze medalist(s)		Yelena Zhupiyova; Soviet Union

The Women's 10,000 m at the 1988 Summer Olympics in Seoul, South Korea had an entry list of 42 competitors (eight were non-starters), with two qualifying heats (42) before the final (20) took place on Friday, September 30, 1988. It was the first time that women had competed in the 10,000 metres at the Olympics.

World record holder Ingrid Kristiansen set the Olympic record in the heats. In the final, she let Olga Bondarenko and Nancy Tinari cruise through 79 second laps, marked by Liz McColgan. A turn after 5 laps, wearing her white gloves, Kristiansen exploded to a 74-second lap, followed by a 69-second lap. The field strung out, only Kathrin Ullrich tried to stay with her, even McColgan held off the fast early pace. Suddenly, at the end of the seventh lap, Kristiansen made a left turn and stepped off the track. With her gone, Ullrich led a breakaway of McColgan, Bondarenko and Yelena Zhupiyeva, 20 metres up on the pack. The gap only grew as the leaders pulled away. Ullrich was the first to drop off with McColgan holding the lead marked by the two Soviets. Over the last two kilometers McColgan kept increasing the pace trying to burn off them off, finally with three laps to go, Zhupiyeva began to crack and drop off. Bondarenko showed the strain but would not go away. With 200 metres to go, Bondarenko sprinted by McColgan. McColgan was unable to change gears and the race was over. Bondarenko had 15 metres over McColgan by the finish, another 60 metres back to Zhupiyeva.

== Records ==
This was the standing World record (in minutes) prior to the 1988 Summer Olympics.

World record	30:13.74	(Norway) Ingrid Kristiansen	Oslo (NOR)	July 5, 1986

The following Olympic records (in minutes) were set during this competition.

Date	Athlete	Time	OR	WR
September 26, 1988	Ingrid Kristiansen (NOR)	31:44.69	OR	
September 30, 1988	Olga Bondarenko (URS)	31:05.21	OR	

== Final ==
RANK	FINAL	TIME
	Olga Bondarenko (URS)	31:05.21(OR)
	Liz McColgan (GBR)	31:08.44
	Yelena Zhupiyeva (URS)	31:19.82
4.	Kathrin Ullrich (GDR)	31:29.27
5.	Francie Larrieu-Smith (USA)	31:35.52
6.	Lynn Jennings (USA)	31:39.93
7.	Wang Xiuting (CHN)	31:40.23
8.	Sue Lee (CAN)	31:50.51
9.	Albertina Machado (POR)	32:02.13
10.	Albertina Dias (POR)	32:07.13
11.	Anne Audain (NZL)	32:10.47
12.	Lyudmila Matveyeva (URS)	32:12.27
13.	Nancy Tinari (CAN)	32:14.05
14.	Rosanna Munerotto (ITA)	32:29.84
15.	Lynn Nelson (USA)	32:32.24
16.	Carole Rouillard (CAN)	32:41.43
17.	Carolyn Schuwalow (AUS)	32:45.07
18.	Wang Qinghuan (CHN)	32:49.86
19.	Annette Sergent (FRA)	33:17.38
–	Ingrid Kristiansen (NOR)	DNF

== Non-qualifiers ==
RANK	NON-QUALIFIERS	TIME
21.	Marleen Renders (BEL)	32:11.49
22.	Akemi Matsuno (JPN)	32:19.57
23.	Christine McMiken (NZL)	32:20.39
24.	Martine Oppliger-Bouchonneau (SUI)	32:28.26
25.	Ana Isabel Alonso (ESP)	32:40.50
26.	Jane Shields (GBR)	32:46.07
27.	Andri Avraam (CYP)	32:59.30
28.	Elhassania Darami (MAR)	33:01.52
29.	Angela Tooby (GBR)	33:26.57
30.	Xie Lihua (CHN)	33:28.13
31.	Jacqueline Perkins (AUS)	33:45.22
32.	Jeong Mi-ja (KOR)	33:48.96
33.	Lieve Slegers (BEL)	33:51.36
–	Erika Fazekas-Veréb (HUN)	DNF
–	Päivi Tikkanen (FIN)	DNS
–	Mar Mar Min (BIR)	DNS
–	Danièle Kaber (LUX)	DNS
–	Kerstin Preßler (FRG)	DNS
–	Ludmila Melicherová (TCH)	DNS
–	Wanda Panfil (POL)	DNS
–	Maryse Justin (MRI)	DNS
–	Tuija Jousimaa (FIN)	DNS

== See also ==
- 1987 Women's World Championships 10.000 metres (Rome)
- 1990 Women's European Championships 10.000 metres (Split)
- 1991 Women's World Championships 10.000 metres (Tokyo)
- 1992 Women's Olympic 10.000 metres (Barcelona)
