= Lynn Nelson (runner) =

American long-distance runner

Personal information
- Full name: Lynn Marie Nelson
- Nationality: American
- Born: January 8, 1962 (age 63)

Sport
- Sport: Long-distance running
- Event: 10,000 metres

Lynn Marie Nelson (born January 8, 1962) is an American long-distance runner. She competed in the women's 10,000 metres at the 1988 Summer Olympics.

Nelson was an All-American runner for the Arizona State Sun Devils track and field team, placing 3rd in the 5000 metres at the 1984 NCAA Division I Outdoor Track and Field Championships.
