= Liz McColgan =

Scottish middle-distance athlete (born 1964)

Liz McColgan-Nuttall MBE
Personal information
- Born: Elizabeth Lynch; 24 May 1964 (age 62) Dundee, Scotland
- Height: 1.70 m (5 ft 7 in)
- Weight: 45 kg (99 lb)

Sport
- Country: Great Britain; Scotland
- Sport: Athletics
- Events: 10,000 metres Marathon; 3000 metres
- Club: Dundee Hawks
Medal record
Women's athletics
Representing Great Britain
Olympic Games
Silver medal – second place	1988 Seoul	10,000 m
World Championships
Gold medal – first place	1991 Tokyo	10,000 m
World Indoor Championships
Silver medal – second place	1989 Budapest	3000 m
World Half Marathon Championships
Gold medal – first place	1992 Newcastle	Women's race
Silver medal – second place	1992 Newcastle	Women's team
Commonwealth Games
Representing Scotland
Gold medal – first place	1986 Edinburgh	10,000 m
Gold medal – first place	1990 Auckland	10,000 m
Bronze medal – third place	1990 Auckland	3000 m
World Marathon Majors
Gold medal – first place	1991 New York City	Marathon
Gold medal – first place	1992 Tokyo	Marathon
Gold medal – first place	1996 London	Marathon
World Cross Country Championships
Silver medal – second place	1987 Warsaw	Women's race
Bronze medal – third place	1991 Amoriebieta	Women's race

Elizabeth Nuttall MBE (née Lynch, formerly McColgan; born 24 May 1964) is a British former middle- and long-distance runner. She won the gold medal in the 10,000 metres at the 1991 World Championships and a silver over the same distance at the 1988 Olympic Games. McColgan earned a silver in the 3000 metres at the 1989 World Indoor Championships. She was a two-time gold medalist in the event at the Commonwealth Games, 1992 World Half Marathon champion and a two-time individual medallist at the World Cross Country Championships. She claimed three victories at the World Marathon Majors: at the 1991 New York City Marathon, 1992 Tokyo Marathon and 1996 London Marathon.

McColgan's 10,000 metres best of 30:57.07 set in 1991, moved her to second on the world all-time list at that time and stood as the Scottish record until 2022, when it was broken by her daughter Eilish McColgan. Her marathon best of 2:26:52 set in 1997, stood as the Scottish record until 2019.

== Early life ==
Born Elizabeth Lynch, she grew up in the Whitfield area of Dundee and was a pupil of St Saviour's RC High School.

She joined her local athletics club, Hawkhill Harriers, aged 12 on the advice of her PE teacher Phil Kearns Coached by Harry Bennett, she soon discovered a talent for distance running and won her first UK titles aged 18. Following Bennett's death, McColgan coached herself in preparation for the Commonwealth Games in Edinburgh in 1986. From 1987 to 1988 McColgan was coached by John Anderson, including at the 1988 Olympics, after which she coached herself to the world 10,000m title and to wins in the London, New York and Tokyo marathons. She then met Grete Waitz, who mentored her from 1992 to her retirement in 1996.

== Athletics career ==
=== Collegiate ===
McColgan first attended Ricks College, where she competed in track and won an NJCAA national cross country title. She missed the 1984–1985 season due to academic ineligibility and then transferred to the University of Alabama to run in the NCAA system.

Running for the Alabama Crimson Tide track and field team, McColgan won the mile run at the 1986 NCAA Division I Indoor Track and Field Championships race in a time of 4:37.73, with Tina Krebs of Clemson University second. However, on the weekend of 10–11 May 1986, McColgan and two other Alabama athletes were reported to have accepted prize money against NCAA rules for placing at a 10K run in Tupelo, Mississippi. McColgan was initially cleared in that incident due to returning the prize check before it was cashed, but later that month an investigation found she had competed in other road races compromising her amateur status, and was disqualified from NCAA events as her mile championship title was vacated. Her coach John Mitchell quit his job in the wake of the findings.

=== Professional ===
At the 1986 Commonwealth Games in Edinburgh, as Liz Lynch, she took the gold medal in the 10,000 metres, finishing nearly 12 seconds ahead of the nearest competitor and giving the host country its only gold medal in athletics. In 1987, she won a silver medal at the World Cross Country Championships in Warsaw representing Scotland (Great Britain would not send a unified team to the World Cross until 1988). She finished behind Annette Sergent of France but ahead of Ingrid Kristiansen. In September, she improved the UK 10,000m record to 31:19.82 while finishing fifth at the World Championships in Rome, in a race won by Kristiansen.

In 1988, now competing as Liz McColgan, she improved her own UK record with 31:06.99 in July to defeat Kristiansen in Oslo. Almost three months later, she ran 31:08.44 to win an Olympic silver medal in the inaugural women's 10,000 metres at the Seoul Olympics. She was defeated by the Soviet Union's Olga Bondarenko. McColgan won silver in the 3,000 metres at the World Indoor Championships in 1989. In January 1990, she became the only Scot to successfully defend a Commonwealth title at the 1990 games in Auckland, New Zealand, when she again took the gold in the 10,000 metres, as well as bronze in the 3,000 metres. She missed the rest of the 1990 season due to pregnancy, giving birth to her daughter (future Olympic athlete) Eilish in November. Nike dropped her the moment she told them she was pregnant.

Just six weeks after her daughter Eilish was born, she contested an international 5 km race in Florida and won a bronze medal at the 1991 World Cross Country Championships. In June 1991, she ran her lifetime best for the 10,000 m with 30:57.07 in Hengelo, becoming only the third woman to run under 31 minutes, moving to second on the world all-time list behind Kristiansen and narrowly ahead of Bondarenko. This stood as the Scottish record until it was broken by Eilish in 2022. In August 1991, she won gold in the 10,000 metres at the World Championships in Tokyo, Japan. In November of that year at the New York City Marathon, her first marathon, she won with a time of 2:27.23, breaking the record for a debut marathon by three minutes.

In March 1992, McColgan struggled to a 41st-place finish at the World Cross Country Championships in Boston. Then, in the summer, she finished fifth in the 10,000m final at the Barcelona Olympics. In September, she won the inaugural World Half Marathon Championships, where she also helped the British team claim the silver medal in the team competition. Two months later, she won the Tokyo International Women's Marathon.

After more than two years struggling with injuries, McColgan finished fifth in the 1995 London Marathon and sixth in the 10,000m final at the 1995 World Championships in Gothenburg. In 1996, she won the London Marathon in a time of 2 hours, 27 minutes and 54 seconds, before finishing 16th in the marathon at the Atlanta Olympics. She finished second in the London Marathons of 1997 and 1998, running her career-best time of 2:26:52 in 1997. She gave her medal to a youngster in the crowd after the 1997 event.

McColgan retired from competing in August 2001 when she fractured a bone in her foot while training for selection for the 2002 Commonwealth Games. However, she returned in 2004 to win the Scottish Indoor Championships 3000 metres (in 9:31). In 2007, she ran the London Marathon, finishing 25th in 2:50:38. She also completed the 2010 New York Marathon in 3:10:54. In 2017, she completed the inaugural Stirling Scottish Marathon in 3:18:32.

== Personal life ==
In 1987, she married Northern Irish athlete Peter McColgan; they had five children together – Eilish, Martin, Eamonn, Kieran and Orla. The couple separated in November 2010 and finalised their divorce in March 2013. On 18 January 2014, McColgan married John Nuttall (1967–2023), a coach who worked as head of endurance coaching for British Athletics and later coached in Qatar, becoming step-mother to Nuttall's son, para-athlete Luke Nuttall, and daughter, British international athlete Hannah Nuttall.

McColgan's eldest daughter, Eilish, is also a distance runner. Eilish broke her mother's Scottish 10,000 metre record in 2022, and emulated her mother by winning the 10,000 metres at the 2022 Commonwealth Games.

== Awards ==
In December 1991, McColgan appeared on This Is Your Life and was voted BBC Sports Personality of the Year. She was appointed a Member of the Order of the British Empire for services to athletics in 1992 and inducted to the Scottish Sports Hall of Fame in 2004.

== Achievements ==
=== International competitions ===
Year	Competition	Venue	Position	Event	Notes
Representing Scotland
1982	World Cross Country Championships	Rome, Italy	71st	4.7 km	16:03
1986	Commonwealth Games	Edinburgh, Scotland	1st	10,000 m	31:41.42
1987	World Cross Country Championships	Warsaw, Poland	2nd	5.1 km	16:48
1990	Commonwealth Games	Auckland, New Zealand	1st	10,000 m	32:23.56
1990	Commonwealth Games	Auckland, New Zealand	3rd	3000 m	8:47.66
Representing Great Britain
1986	European Championships	Stuttgart, West Germany	12th	3000 m	9:02.42
1986	European Championships	Stuttgart, West Germany	7th	10,000 m	31:49.46
1987	World Championships	Rome, Italy	5th	10,000 m	31:19.82
1988	Olympic Games	Seoul, South Korea	2nd	10,000 m	31:08.44
1989	World Indoor Championships	Budapest, Hungary	6th	1500 m	4:10.16
1989	World Indoor Championships	Budapest, Hungary	2nd	3000 m	8:34.80
1991	World Cross Country Championships	Antwerp, Belgium	3rd	6.4 km	20:28
1991	World Championships	Tokyo, Japan	1st	10,000 m	31:14.31
1992	World Cross Country Championships	Boston, MA, United States	41st	6.4 km	22:21
1992	Olympic Games	Barcelona, Spain	5th	10,000 m	31:26.11
1992	World Half Marathon Championships	Newcastle, United Kingdom	1st	Half marathon	1:08:53
1993	World Cross Country Championships	Amorebieta, Spain	5th	6.4 km	20:17
1995	World Championships	Gothenburg, Sweden	6th	10,000 m	31:40.14
1996	Olympic Games	Atlanta, GA, United States	16th	Marathon	2:34:30
World Marathon Majors
1991	New York City Marathon	New York, NY, United States	1st	Marathon	2:27:32
1992	Tokyo Marathon	Tokyo, Japan	1st	Marathon	2:27:38
1993	London Marathon	London, United Kingdom	3rd	Marathon	2:29:37
1995	London Marathon	London, United Kingdom	5th	Marathon	2:31:14
1995	Tokyo Marathon	Tokyo, Japan	7th	Marathon	2:30:32
1996	London Marathon	London, United Kingdom	1st	Marathon	2:27:54
1997	London Marathon	London, United Kingdom	2nd	Marathon	2:26:52
1998	London Marathon	London, United Kingdom	2nd	Marathon	2:26:54
2007	London Marathon	London, United Kingdom	25th	Marathon	2:50:38
2010	New York City Marathon	New York, NY, United States	129th	Marathon	3:10:54
Other marathons
2017	Stirling Scottish Marathon	Stirling, United Kingdom	16th	Marathon	3:18:32

=== Personal bests ===
- 1500 metres – 4:01.38 (Oslo 1987)
- One mile – 4:26.11 London (1987)
- 3000 metres – 8:38.23 (Nice 1991)
- 5000 metres – 14:59.56 (Hechtel-Eksel 1995)
- 10,000 metres – 30:57.07 (Hengelo 1991)

Road

- 5 kilometres – 15:11 (Carlsbad, CA 1991)
- 10 kilometres – 30:38 (Orlando, FL 1989)
- 10 miles – 52:00 (Portsmouth 1997)
- Half marathon – 1:08:42 (Dundee 1992)
- Marathon – 2:26:52 (London 1997)

Awards and achievements
Preceded by (England) Paul Gascoigne	BBC Sports Personality of the Year; 1991	Succeeded by (England) Nigel Mansell
Sporting positions
Preceded by (Norway) Ingrid Kristiansen	Women's 5,000 m Best Year Performance; 1987–1988	Succeeded by (East Germany) Kathrin Weßel
Preceded by (Kenya) Tegla Loroupe	Zevenheuvelenloop Women's Winner (15 km); 1994	Succeeded by (Kenya) Hellen Kimaiyo
