= Ingrid Kristiansen =

Norwegian long-distance runner

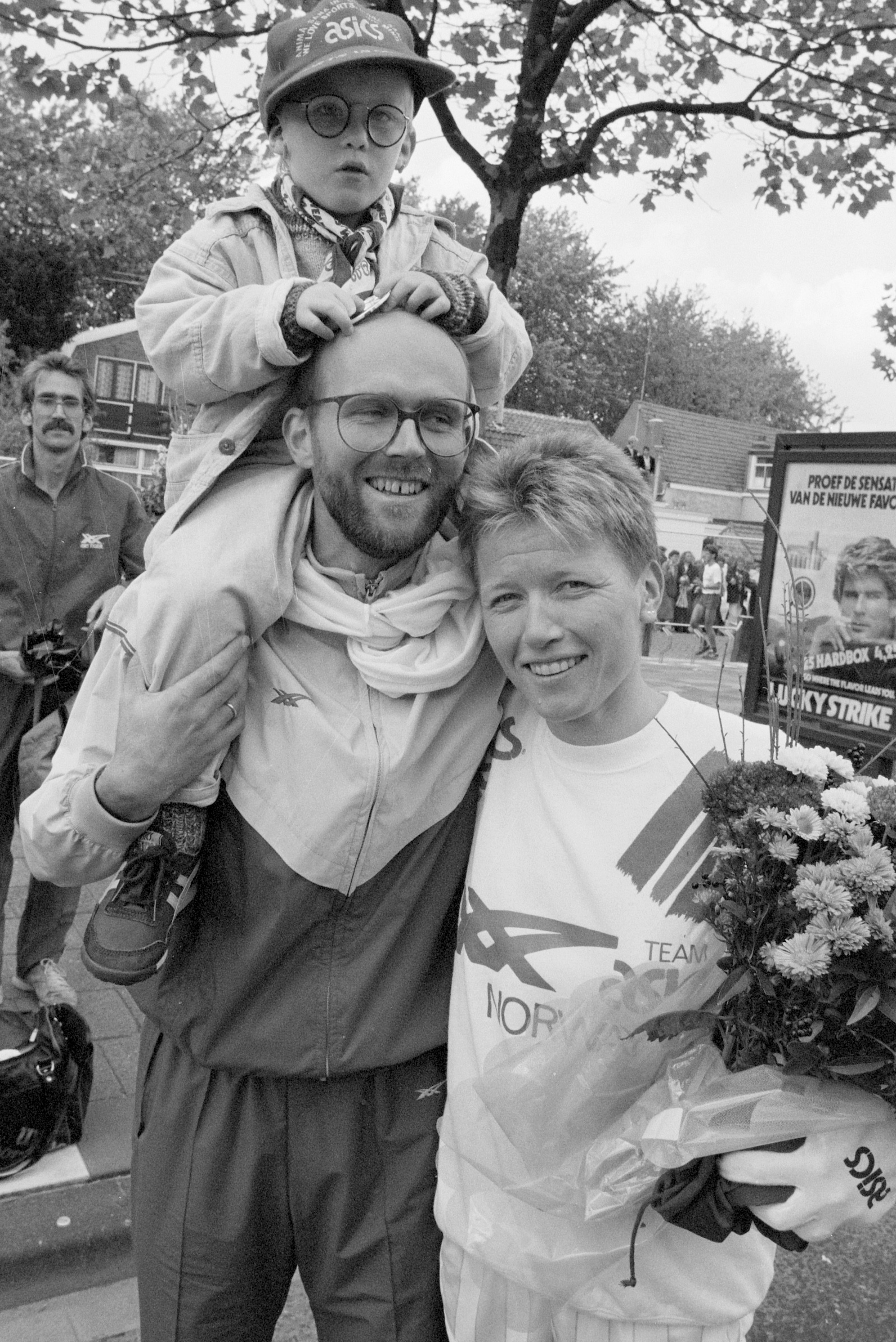
- Kristiansen with family following an October 1987 competition in Zaandam

Personal information
- Born: 21 March 1956 (age 70) Trondheim, Norway
- Height: 1.69 m (5 ft 7 in)
- Weight: 50 kg (110 lb)

Sport
- Sport: Athletics
- Event: Long-distance runner
- Club: IL i BUL
Medal record
Women's athletics
Representing Norway
World Championships
Gold medal – first place	1987 Rome	10,000 m
Bronze medal – third place	1980 Sittard	3000 m
World Cross Country Championships
Gold medal – first place	1988 Auckland	women's race
Bronze medal – third place	1985 Lisbon	women's race
Bronze medal – third place	1987 Warsaw	women's race
World Road Race Championships
Gold medal – first place	1987 Monte Carlo	15 km
Gold medal – first place	1988 Adelaide	15 km
European Championships
Gold medal – first place	1986 Stuttgart	10,000 m
Bronze medal – third place	1982 Athens	Marathon

Ingrid Kristiansen (née Christensen on 21 March 1956) is a Norwegian former athlete. She was one of the best female long-distance runners during the 1980s. She is a former world record holder in the 5000 metres, 10,000 metres and the marathon (at one point in time she held those records simultaneously). Kristiansen was a World Champion on the track, roads and cross-country, becoming the first athlete to win World titles on all three surfaces. At the 1984 Los Angeles Olympics, she finished fourth in the first women's Olympic marathon. At the 1988 Seoul Olympics, she dropped out of the 10,000 metres final while leading. Early in her career, she was also an elite cross country skier, winning several Norwegian titles and a European junior championships.

Kristiansen's 1986 world record in the 10,000 m was not broken for 5 years. Her 1985 London Marathon 2:21:06 was the record marathon time for 13 years.

== Career ==
Ingrid Kristiansen started her career quite unremarkably, running 2:30 to 2:40 for her first few marathons. She won the bronze medal in the 3000 metres at the 1980 World Championships in Athletics and won the 1983 Houston Marathon in 2:33:27 while two months pregnant—a fact she didn't know until two months later. It was not until she gave birth to her first son, Gaute, that her times began to improve. After winning the Houston Marathon again and the London Marathon in 1984, she placed fourth in the first Olympic women's marathon in Los Angeles. She also set two track world records in the 5,000 m (14:58.9) on 28 June 1984 and the 10,000 m (30:59.42) on 27 July 1985, at the Bislett Games in Oslo.

In 1985 she won the London Marathon again in a new world record of 2:21:06; the previous record was 2:22:43 set in the 1983 Boston Marathon by Joan Benoit. Later in 1985 she lost to Benoit in the Chicago Marathon, running 2:23:05 for second place.

1986 was Kristiansen's best year in track. After she won the Boston Marathon in hot conditions, she set a new world record in the 10,000 m (30:13.3), smashing her own world record from 1984 by 46 seconds. Then she broke the 5,000 m world record, running 14:37.89. On 5 April 1987, she won a half marathon in Sandnes, running 1:06:40, but the course was not measured properly and the world record still remained with Joan Benoit. She won the Chicago Marathon, once again in hot and humid conditions, running 2:27:08. She ended the year winning the 10,000 m event at European Championships, running the 2nd fastest time ever (30:23.3) and nearly 40 seconds ahead of the second-place finisher.

In 1987 Kristiansen attempted to break her marathon world record in London, but she slowed in the second half and won in 2:22:48. She won the first World Championships Women's 10,000 m in Rome, despite a leg injury. In 1988 she won the London Marathon for the fourth time, finishing in a time of 2:25:41. Despite a 1:09 first half, she slowed dramatically in the second half, however she was still five minutes ahead of any other woman. At the Olympic Games in Seoul, she participated in the 10,000 m, and even though she was the heavy favourite, she dropped out after seven laps with a fractured bone in her foot.

She returned to racing in 1989, winning the Boston Marathon in 2:24:33 despite the heat in the latter stages. She decided not to run any track races that year, but she still won a few road races in Europe. Her final marathon was the 1989 New York City Marathon, which she won in a time of 2:25:30, running away with it from the start. Gradually she raced less and less, despite winning the 1990 City-Pier-City Loop in The Hague. She retired in 1993 and lives with her husband and two children in Oslo, Norway.

She won 14 out of 26 marathons entered.

== Achievements ==
Year	Competition	Venue	Position	Event	Notes
Representing Norway
1980	Stockholm Marathon	Stockholm, Sweden	1st	Marathon	2:38:45
1981	Stockholm Marathon	Stockholm, Sweden	1st	Marathon	2:41:34
1981	New York City Marathon	New York, United States	2nd	Marathon	2:30:08
1982	Stockholm Marathon	Stockholm, Sweden	1st	Marathon	2:34:26
1982	European Championships	Athens, Greece	3rd	Marathon	2:36:38
1982	New York City Marathon	New York, United States	5th	Marathon	2:33:36
1983	Houston Marathon	Houston, United States	1st	Marathon	2:33:27
1984	Houston Marathon	Houston, United States	1st	Marathon	2:27:51
1984	World Cross Country Championships	New York, United States	4th		
1984	London Marathon	London, United Kingdom	1st	Marathon	2:24:26
1984	Olympic Games	Los Angeles, United States	4th	Marathon	2:27:14
1985	World Cross Country Championships	Lisbon, Portugal	3rd		
1985	London Marathon	London, United Kingdom	1st	Marathon	2:21:06
1985	Chicago Marathon	Chicago, United States	2nd	Marathon	2:23:05
1986	Boston Marathon	Boston, United States	1st	Marathon	2:24:55
1986	European Championships	Stuttgart, West Germany	1st	10,000 m	30:23.25
1986	Chicago Marathon	Chicago, United States	1st	Marathon	2:27:08
1987	World Cross Country Championships	Warsaw, Poland	3rd		
1987	London Marathon	London, United Kingdom	1st	Marathon	2:22:48
1987	World Championships	Rome, Italy	1st	10,000 m	31:05.85
1987	World Road Race Championships	Monte Carlo, Monaco	1st	15 km	47:17
1988	World Road Race Championships	Adelaide, Australia	1st	15 km	48:24
1988	World Cross Country Championships	Auckland, New Zealand	1st		
1988	London Marathon	London, United Kingdom	1st	Marathon	2:25:41
1988	Olympic Games	Seoul, South Korea	—	10,000 m	DNF
1989	Boston Marathon	Boston, United States	1st	Marathon	2:24:33
1989	New York City Marathon	New York, United States	1st	Marathon	2:25:30
1991	World Championships	Tokyo, Japan	7th	10,000 m	32:10.75

Note: The 1987 World Road Race Championship was held in November while the 1988 edition was held in March.

=== World Records ===
- 5000 m world record with 14:58.89 in Oslo, 28 June 1984 – first woman to run under 15 minutes
- 5000 m world record with 14:37.33 in Stockholm, 5 August 1986. This time improved the world record by over 10 seconds and stood for nearly 9 years.
- 10,000 m world record with 30:59.42 in Oslo, 27 July 1985 – first woman to run under 31 minutes
- 10,000 m world record with 30:13.74 in Oslo, 5 July 1986
- Marathon world record with 2:21:06 in London, 21 April 1985 – record stood for 13 years.

=== Other ===
- 24 individual Norwegian championships
- 1992 Egebergs Ærespris

== Personal bests ==
Distance	Mark	Date	Location
3,000 m	8:34.10	13 August 1986	Zürich
5,000 m	14:37.33	5 August 1986	Stockholm
10,000 m	30:13.74	5 July 1986	Oslo
10 km (road)	30:59	9 April 1989	Boston
15 km (road)	47:17	21 November 1987	Monaco
Half Marathon*	1:06:40	19 March 1987	Sandnes
Marathon	2:21:06	21 April 1985	London

* Because of a measurement error this run doesn't qualify for record purposes.

== Cross-country skiing results ==
=== World Championships ===
Year	Age	5 km	10 km	20 km	4 × 5 km relay
1978	21	21	—	—	—

Records
Preceded by Jan Merrill; Mary Decker; Zola Budd	Women's 5,000 m World Record Holder; 11 July 1981 – 6 September 1981; 28 June 1984 – 26 August 1985; 5 August 1986 – 22 July 1995	Succeeded by Yelena Sipatova; Zola Budd; Fernanda Ribeiro
Preceded by (United States) Joan Benoit	Women's Marathon World Record Holder; 21 April 1985 – 19 April 1998	Succeeded by (Kenya) Tegla Loroupe
Preceded by Olga Bondarenko	Women's 10,000 m World Record Holder; 27 July 1985 – 8 September 1993	Succeeded by Wang Junxia
Preceded by (United States) Joan Benoit	Women's Half marathon World record holder 5 April 1987 – 18 May 1991	Succeeded by (South Africa) Elana Meyer
Awards
Preceded by Birger Ruud	Egebergs Ærespris; 1992	Succeeded by Anita Andreassen
Sporting positions
Preceded by Marja Wokke	Egmond Women's Half Marathon Winner; 1982	Succeeded by Annie van Stiphout
Preceded by Zola Budd; Zola Budd	Women's 5,000 m Best Year Performance; 1984; 1986	Succeeded by Zola Budd; Liz McColgan
Preceded by Carla Beurskens	Zevenheuvelenloop Women's Winner (15 km); 1991	Succeeded by Tegla Loroupe
