= Olga Bondarenko =

Soviet long-distance runner

Medal record

Women's athletics

Representing Soviet Union

European Championships
Gold medal – first place	1986 Stuttgart	3000 m
Silver medal – second place	1986 Stuttgart	10,000 m

Olga Petrovna Bondarenko (née Krentser, Russian: О́льга Петро́вна Бондаре́нко-Кренцер; born 2 June 1960 in Slavgorod) is a retired Russian track and field athlete who competed mainly in the 10,000 metres. She trained at the Armed Forces sports society in Volgograd and represented the Soviet Union internationally.

She competed for the Soviet Union at the 1988 Summer Olympics held in Seoul, South Korea, where she won the gold medal in the first Olympic women's 10,000 metres event, setting a new Olympic record with a time of 31:05.21.

== International competitions ==
Year	Competition	Venue	Position	Event	Notes
Representing Soviet Union
1985	World Cross Country Championships	Lisbon, Portugal	7th	5 km	
1985	World Cup	Canberra, Australia	3rd	10,000 m	32:07.70
1986	European Championships	Stuttgart, West Germany	1st	3000 m	8:33.99
1986	European Championships	Stuttgart, West Germany	2nd	10,000 m	30:57.21
1987	World Indoor Championships	Indianapolis, United States	2nd	3000 m	8:47.08
1987	World Cross Country Championships	Warsaw, Poland	13th	5 km	
1987	World Championships	Rome, Italy	DNS (final)	3000 m	8:48.11(heat)
1987	World Championships	Rome, Italy	4th	10,000 m	31:18.38
1988	World Cross Country Championships	Auckland, New Zealand	20th	6 km	
1988	Olympic Games	Seoul, South Korea	1st	10,000 m	31:05.21
Representing Unified Team
1992	Olympic Games	Barcelona, Spain	heats	10,000 m	DNF

== See also ==
- List of Olympic medalists in athletics (women)
- List of 1988 Summer Olympics medal winners
- List of IAAF World Indoor Championships medalists (women)
- List of European Athletics Championships medalists (women)
- List of European Athletics Indoor Championships medalists (women)
- List of Russian sportspeople

Sporting positions
Preceded by Mary Slaney	Women's 3000 m season's best 1986	Succeeded by Ulrike Bruns
