= 1987 World Championships in Athletics – Women's 3000 metres =

These are the official results of the Women's 3.000 metres event at the 1987 IAAF World Championships in Rome, Italy. There were a total number of 30 participating athletes and one non-starter, with two qualifying heats and the final held on Tuesday 1987-09-01.

== Medalists ==
Gold	Tetyana Samolenko; Soviet Union (URS)
Silver	Maricica Puică; Romania (ROU)
Bronze	Ulrike Bruns; East Germany (GDR)

== Records ==
Existing records at the start of the event.

World record	Tatyana Kazankina (URS)	8:22.62	Leningrad, USSR	August 26, 1984
Championship record	Mary Decker-Slaney (USA)	8:34.62	Helsinki, Finland	August 10, 1983

== Final ==
RANK	FINAL	TIME
	Tetyana Samolenko (URS)	8:38.73
	Maricica Puică (ROU)	8:39.45
	Ulrike Bruns (GDR)	8:40.30
4.	Cornelia Bürki (SUI)	8:40.31
5.	Yelena Romanova (URS)	8:41.33
6.	Elly van Hulst (NED)	8:42.56
7.	Yvonne Murray (GBR)	8:43.94
8.	Wendy Sly (GBR)	8:45.85
9.	Lynn Williams (CAN)	8:49.91
10.	Mary Knisely (USA)	8:50.99
11.	Vera Michallek (FRG)	8:55.16
12.	Christine Benning (GBR)	8:57.92
13.	Debbie Bowker (CAN)	8:58.63
14.	Marie-Pierre Duros (FRA)	9:14.61
—	Olga Bondarenko (URS)	DNS

== Qualifying heats ==
- Held on Saturday 1987-08-29

RANK	HEAT 1	TIME
1.	Debbie Bowker (CAN)	8:46.88
2.	Ulrike Bruns (GDR)	8:47.15
3.	Cornelia Bürki (SUI)	8:47.95
4.	Olga Bondarenko (URS)	8:48.11
5.	Yvonne Murray (GBR)	8:48.44
6.	Vera Michallek (FRG)	8:49.61
7.	Mary Knisely (USA)	8:49.61
8.	Annette Sergent (FRA)	8:52.45
9.	Cindy Bremser (USA)	8:54.17
10.	Jackie Perkins (AUS)	8:57.24
11.	Fernanda Ribeiro (POR)	9:01.15
12.	Dorina Calenic (ROU)	9:01.83
13.	Satu Levelä (FIN)	9:16.28
14.	Monica Regonesi (CHI)	9:26.11
15.	Raj Kumari Pandey (NEP)	10:44.15

RANK	HEAT 2	TIME
1.	Wendy Sly (GBR)	8:44.79
2.	Yelena Romanova (URS)	8:45.00
3.	Tetyana Samolenko (URS)	8:45.20
4.	Elly van Hulst (NED)	8:45.20
5.	Maricica Puică (ROU)	8:45.55
6.	Marie-Pierre Duros (FRA)	8:46.11
7.	Lynn Williams (CAN)	8:47.43
8.	Christine Benning (GBR)	8:48.63
9.	Wang Xiuting (CHN)	8:50.68
10.	Paula Ivan (ROU)	8:51.20
11.	Leslie Seymour (USA)	8:51.34
12.	Radka Naplatanova (BUL)	8:51.98
13.	Agnese Possamai (ITA)	8:57.85
14.	Andri Avraam (CYP)	9:09.34
—	Martine Fays (FRA)	DNF
—	Fanny Gidiyoni (MAW)	DNS

== See also ==
- 1983 Women's World Championships 3.000 metres (Helsinki)
- 1984 Women's Olympic 3.000 metres (Los Angeles)
- 1986 Women's European Championships 3.000 metres (Stuttgart)
- 1988 Women's Olympic 3.000 metres (Seoul)
- 1990 Women's European Championships 3.000 metres (Split)
- 1991 Women's World Championships 3.000 metres (Tokyo)
