= 1986 European Athletics Championships – Women's 3000 metres =

Women's 3000 metres at the European Athletics Championships

These are the official results of the Women's 3,000 metres event at the 1986 European Championships in Stuttgart, West Germany, held at Neckarstadion on 26 and 28 August 1986.

== Medalists ==
| Gold | Olga Bondarenko; Soviet Union |
| Silver | Maricica Puică; Romania |
| Bronze | Yvonne Murray; United Kingdom |

== Final ==
| Rank | Final | Time |
|---|---|---|
| | Olga Bondarenko (URS) | 8:33.99 |
| | Maricica Puică (ROU) | 8:35.92 |
| | Yvonne Murray (GBR) | 8:37:15 |
| 4. | Zola Budd (GBR) | 8:38:20 |
| 5. | Tatyana Samolenko (URS) | 8:40:35 |
| 6. | Yelena Zhupiyeva (URS) | 8:40:74 |
| 7. | Cornelia Bürki (SUI) | 8:44:44 |
| 8. | Annette Sergent (FRA) | 8:47:52 |
| 9. | Elly van Hulst (NED) | 8:49:22 |
| 10. | Vera Michallek (FRG) | 8:57:28 |
| 11. | Iris Biba (FRG) | 9:00:20 |
| 12. | Liz Lynch (GBR) | 9:02:42 |
| 13. | Martine Fays (FRA) | 9:04:67 |
| 14. | Christin Sørum (NOR) | 9:11:80 |
| | Midde Hamrin (SWE) | DNF |

== Qualifying heats ==
| Rank | Heat 1 | Time |
|---|---|---|
| 1. | Olga Bondarenko (URS) | 8:53.98 |
| 2. | Cornelia Bürki (SUI) | 8:55.82 |
| 3. | Vera Michallek (FRG) | 8:56:28 |
| 4. | Elly van Hulst (NED) | 8:57:55 |
| 5. | Iris Biba (FRG) | 8:58:76 |
| 6. | Liz Lynch (GBR) | 8:58:85 |
| 7. | Martine Fays (FRA) | 8:59:39 |
| 8. | Christin Sørum (NOR) | 9:00:13 |
| 9. | Mariana Stanescu (ROU) | 9:02:57 |
| 10. | Jana Kuceriková (TCH) | 9:08:71 |
| 11. | Ingrid Delagrange (BEL) | 9:15:37 |
| 12. | Eva Ernström (SWE) | 9:20:50 |
| 13. | Fernanda Ribeiro (POR) | 9:32:87 |
| | Doina Melinte (ROU) | DNF |

| Rank | Heat 2 | Time |
|---|---|---|
| 1. | Maricica Puică (ROU) | 8:47.70 |
| 2. | Zola Budd (GBR) | 8:48.02 |
| 3. | Yelena Zhupiyeva (URS) | 8:49.18 |
| 4. | Yvonne Murray (GBR) | 8:49.56 |
| 5. | Tatyana Samolenko (URS) | 8:51.29 |
| 6. | Annette Sergent (FRA) | 8:57.21 |
| 7. | Midde Hamrin (SWE) | 9:02.32 |
| 8. | Sandra Gasser (SUI) | 9:04.78 |
| 9. | Snežana Pajkić (YUG) | 9:07.44 |
| 10. | Corinne Debaets (BEL) | 9:09.13 |
| 11. | Marion Josefsen (NOR) | 9:18:72 |
| 12. | Danièle Kaber (LUX) | 9:20.00 |
| 13. | Gitte Karlshøj (DEN) | 9:33.47 |
| | Brigitte Kraus (FRG) | DNF |

== Participation ==
According to an unofficial count, 28 athletes from 15 countries participated in the event.

- Belgium (2)
- Czechoslovakia (1)
- Denmark (1)
- France (2)
- Luxembourg (1)
- Netherlands (1)
- Norway (2)
- Portugal (1)
- Romania (3)
- Soviet Union (3)
- Sweden (2)
- Switzerland (2)
- United Kingdom (3)
- West Germany (3)
- Yugoslavia (1)

== See also ==
- 1982 Women's European Championships 3,000 metres (Athens)
- 1983 Women's World Championships 3,000 metres (Helsinki)
- 1984 Women's Olympic 3,000 metres (Los Angeles)
- 1987 Women's World Championships 3,000 metres (Rome)
- 1988 Women's Olympic 3,000 metres (Seoul)
- 1990 Women's European Championships 3,000 metres (Split)
