= Martine Fays =

French distance runner (born 1959)

Personal information
- Born: 3 August 1959 (age 66)
- Height: 1.73 m (5 ft 8 in)
- Weight: 55 kg (121 lb)

Sport
- Country: France
- Sport: Athletics
- Event(s): 3000 metres, cross country running

Achievements and titles
- Personal best: 3000 m: 8:46.18 (1987)
Medal record
World Cross Country Championships
Silver medal – second place	1989 Stavanger	Team
Silver medal – second place	1987 Warsaw	Team
Bronze medal – third place	1986 Colombier	Team

Martine Fays (born 3 August 1959) is a French distance runner who competed mainly in the 3000 metres and cross country running events. She made eight appearances for France at the IAAF World Cross Country Championships between 1982 and 1991. She won three women's team medals (two silver and one bronze), running alongside compatriots Annette Sergent, Anne Viallix, Jacqueline Lefeuvre, Maria Lelut and Marie-Pierre Duros. Her best individual finish at the competition was fourth at the 1986 race, where she was pipped to the bronze by teammate Sergent.

On the track, Fays set a French national record in the 3000 m with a run of 8:46.18 minutes (a lifetime best) at the 1987 Meeting Nikaïa. She ranked in the top twenty runners for that event in the 1987 season and 1989 season. She was a finalist in the 3000 m at the European Athletics Championships in 1986 and 1990, though never made the top ten, and ran in the heats of the 1987 World Championships in Athletics.

Born in Vinay, Isère, she competed for France internationally 19 times. She was a member of three clubs during her career: Grenoble UC up to 1987, then Individuelle Dauphinée-Savoie in 1988, and finally ASPTT Grenoble from 1989 onwards. She won one national title during her career, winning the 1500 metres at the French Athletics Championships in 1983. In professional road running, she was a three-time winner of the Paris-Versailles Race and won the 1992 Chris McKinnon Memorial Race.

== International competitions ==
Year	Competition	Venue	Position	Event	Notes
1982	World Cross Country Championships	Rome, Italy	51st	Senior race	15:41.3
1982	World Cross Country Championships	Rome, Italy	8th	Team	158 pts
1983	European Cup B Final	Sittard, Netherlands	6th	1500 m	4:15.29
1984	World Cross Country Championships	East Rutherford, United States	69th	Senior race	17:17
1984	World Cross Country Championships	East Rutherford, United States	11th	Team	197 pts
1985	World Cross Country Championships	Lisbon, Portugal	23rd	Senior race	15:57
1985	World Cross Country Championships	Lisbon, Portugal	4th	Team	109 pts
1986	World Cross Country Championships	Colombier, Switzerland	4th	Senior race	15:14.3
1986	World Cross Country Championships	Colombier, Switzerland	3rd	Team	76 pts
1986	European Championships	Stuttgart, West Germany	13th	3000 m	9:04:67
1987	World Cross Country Championships	Warsaw, Poland	12th	Senior race	17:19
1987	World Cross Country Championships	Warsaw, Poland	2nd	Team	50 pts
1987	World Championships	Rome, Italy	— (heats)	3000 m	DNF
1989	World Cross Country Championships	Stavanger, Norway	17th	Senior race	23:21
1989	World Cross Country Championships	Stavanger, Norway	2nd	Team	60 pts
1990	World Cross Country Championships	Aix-les-Bains, France	220th	Senior race	20:00
1990	World Cross Country Championships	Aix-les-Bains, France	6th	Team	125 pts
1990	European Championships	Split, Yugoslavia	12th	3000 m	8:56:36
1991	World Cross Country Championships	Antwerp, Belgium	30th	Senior race	21:22
1991	World Cross Country Championships	Antwerp, Belgium	8th	Team	175 pts

== National titles ==
- French Athletics Championships
  - 1500 m: 1983
