= Athletics at the 1984 Summer Olympics – Women's 3000 metres =

Women's 3000 metres at the Games of the XXIII Olympiad
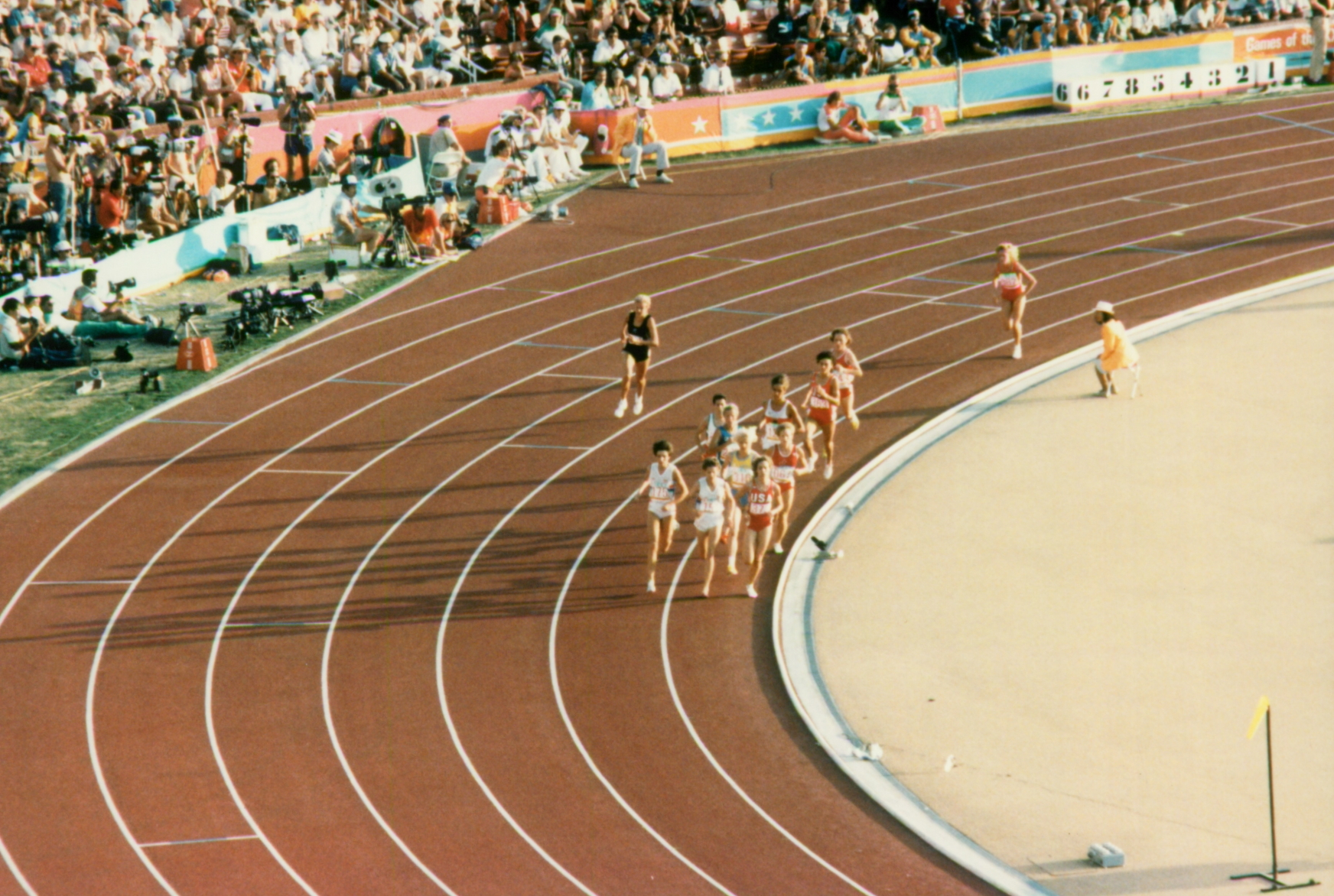
- Mary Decker (right) leading the pack, next to her Zola Budd
- Venue: Los Angeles Memorial Coliseum
- Dates: 8 August 1984 (heats); 10 August 1984 (final)
- Competitors: 30 from 22 nations
- Winning time: 8:35.96 OR

Medalists
1st place, gold medalist(s)		Maricica Puică; Romania
2nd place, silver medalist(s)		Wendy Sly; Great Britain
3rd place, bronze medalist(s)		Lynn Williams; Canada

These are the official results of the Women's 3000 metres event at the 1984 Summer Olympics in Los Angeles, California. The final, held on August 10, 1984, was won by Maricica Puică of Romania. This was the first ever 3000 meters race for women at the Olympics. The race is still remembered because of the fall of world champion Mary Decker after a collision with Zola Budd.

The winning margin was 3.51 seconds. This was the only time the women's 3,000 metres was won by more than one second at the Olympics.

Mary Decker won the first heat to claim the new Olympic record. Maricica Puică improved upon the record in the third heat.

South African teenager Zola Budd had obtained British citizenship controversially fast (through an agreement between her father, Frank Budd, and the London Daily Mail) in order to enter the Olympics. The Apartheid government of South Africa had been banned from worldwide competition. Budd, who intentionally ran barefoot, was essentially an unknown athlete on the world stage. Decker also was largely untested in domestic races and had relatively little experience running competitively in a crowd. In addition to being the favorite in the race, this was a hometown Olympics for Decker, having grown up barely 50 km (33 miles) from the Coliseum.

From the gun, Decker went to the front, with Puică a metre back. Starting slower, Budd ran through the field to assume her position on Decker's shoulder 200 metres into the race. They ran in the same formation for three laps. With four laps to go, Wendy Sly moved forward to challenge for the lead next to Budd. Coming off the turn, Budd moved toward the curb. Decker stepped on her back kick, then shortly after, collided with the British runner and fell spectacularly to the curb, injuring her hip. As a result, Mary Decker did not finish the race. Decker was carried off the track in tears by her boyfriend (and later, husband), British discus thrower Richard Slaney. Puică rushed around Budd into the lead, with Sly on her shoulder as the bewildered Budd lost ground for a moment. But Budd ran around Puică and Sly to again take the lead. Deeper in the pack, somehow Brigitte Kraus also fell into the infield and out of the race. With a lap and a half to go, Sly again edged her way around Budd and into the lead. While Sly and Budd wore the same uniform, they were essentially strangers and there was no effort to cooperate tactically. Puică followed Sly around Budd and with 500 metres to go. Sly took the bell with Puică on her shoulder. With 250 metres to go, Puică passed Sly and went into her finishing kick, separating from Sly. Lynn Williams caught Budd and moved into third position. Budd continued to fall back through the field as the other athletes were launching their finishing kicks. Puică extended her lead over Sly, Williams even further back in third. Budd fizzled into seventh place. Out of 12 starters, 4 had fallen during the race, with two not finishing. As Puică crossed the finishing line, with Sly some 15 meters behind, she clearly appeared to have had more to give, if it had been necessary.

== Medalists ==
Gold	Maricica Puică; Romania
Silver	Wendy Sly; Great Britain
Bronze	Lynn Williams; Canada

== Abbreviations ==
Q	automatic qualification
q	qualification by rank
DNS	did not start
NM	no mark
OR	olympic record
WR	world record
AR	area record
NR	national record
PB	personal best
SB	season best

== Final ==
RANK	FINAL	TIME
	Maricica Puică (ROU)	8:35.96 OR
	Wendy Sly (GBR)	8:39.47
	Lynn Williams (CAN)	8:42.14
4.	Cindy Bremser (USA)	8:42.78
5.	Cornelia Bürki (SUI)	8:45.20
6.	Aurora Cunha (POR)	8:46.37
7.	Zola Budd (GBR)	8:48.80
8.	Joan Hansen (USA)	8:51.53
9.	Dianne Rodger (NZL)	8.56.43
10.	Agnese Possamai (ITA)	9:10.82
—	Brigitte Kraus (FRG)	DNF
—	Mary Decker (USA)	DNF

== Qualifying heats ==
- Held on 1984-08-08

RANK	HEAT 1	TIME
1.	Mary Decker (USA)	8:44.38 OR
2.	Lynn Williams (CAN)	8:45.77
3.	Agnese Possamai (ITA)	8:45.84
4.	Aurora Cunha (POR)	8:46.38
5.	Dianne Rodger (NZL)	8:47.90
6.	Jane Furniss (GBR)	8:48.00
7.	Hellen Kimaiyo (KEN)	8:57.21
8.	Roisin Smyth (IRL)	9:01.69
9.	Raida Abdallah (JOR)	10:48.00
—	Helen Ritter (LIE)	DNS

RANK	HEAT 2	TIME
1.	Brigitte Kraus (FRG)	8:57.53
2.	Joan Hansen (USA)	8:58.64
3.	Wendy Sly (GBR)	8:58.66
4.	Maria Machado (POR)	9:01.77
5.	Donna Gould (AUS)	9:05.56
6.	Eva Ernström (SWE)	9:06.54
7.	Annette Sergent (FRA)	9:15.82
8.	Sue French (CAN)	9:24.66
9.	Liliana Gongora (ARG)	9:41.14
10.	Hwinga Mwanjala (TAN)	9:42.66

RANK	HEAT 3	TIME
1.	Maricica Puică (ROU)	8:43.32 OR
2.	Cindy Bremser (USA)	8:43.97
3.	Zola Budd (GBR)	8:44.62
4.	Cornelia Bürki (SUI)	8:45.82
5.	Monica Joyce (IRL)	8:54.34
6.	Geri Fitch (CAN)	9:07.18
7.	Marie-Jane Mukamurenzi (RWA)	9:27.08
8.	Geeta Zutshi (IND)	9:40.63
9.	Kriscia Lorena García (ESA)	9:42.28 NR
—	Monica Regonesi (CHI)	DNF
—	Rosa Mota (POR)	DNF

== See also ==
- 1982 Women's European Championships 3000 metres (Athens)
- 1983 Women's World Championships 3000 metres (Helsinki)
- 1984 Women's Friendship Games 3000 metres (Prague)
- 1986 Women's European Championships 3000 metres (Stuttgart)
- 1987 Women's World Championships 3000 metres (Rome)
