= 1982 European Athletics Championships – Women's 3000 metres =

Women's 3000 metres at the European Athletics Championships

These are the official results of the Women's 3,000 metres event at the 1982 European Championships in Athens, Greece. The final was held at Olympic Stadium "Spiros Louis" on 9 September 1982.

== Medalists ==
Gold	Svetlana Ulmasova; Soviet Union
Silver	Maricica Puică; Romania
Bronze	Yelena Sipatova; Soviet Union

== Final ==
Rank	Final	Time
	Svetlana Ulmasova (URS)	8:30.28
	Maricica Puică (ROU)	8:33.33
	Yelena Sipatova (URS)	8:34.06
4.	Tatyana Pozdnyakova (URS)	8:38.98
5.	Birgit Friedmann (FRG)	8:43.65
6.	Margherita Gargano (ITA)	8:48.73
7.	Brigitte Kraus (FRG)	8:51.60
8.	Ingrid Kristiansen (NOR)	8:51.79
9.	Agnese Possamai (ITA)	8:54.52
10.	Aurora Cunha (POR)	8:55.24
11.	Cornelia Bürki (SUI)	8:55.67
12.	Rosa Mota (POR)	9:04.82
13.	Monica Joyce (IRL)	9:08.45
14.	Birgit Bringslid (SWE)	9:09.85
15.	Breda Pergar (YUG)	9:11.79
16.	Mercedes Calleja (ESP)	9:12.32
17.	Dorthe Rasmussen (DEN)	9:14.35
18.	Eva Ernström (SWE)	9:15.12
19.	Louise McGrillen (IRL)	9:20.60
20.	Debbie Peel (GBR)	9:24.41
	Jeanette Nordgren (SWE)	DQ

== Participation ==
According to an unofficial count, 21 athletes from 13 countries participated in the event.

- Denmark (1)
- Ireland (2)
- Italy (2)
- Norway (1)
- Portugal (2)
- Romania (1)
- Soviet Union (3)
- Spain (1)
- Sweden (3)
- Switzerland (1)
- United Kingdom (1)
- West Germany (2)
- Yugoslavia (1)

== See also ==
- 1978 Women's European Championships 3,000 metres (Prague)
- 1980 Women's Olympic 3,000 metres (Moscow)
- 1983 Women's World Championships 3,000 metres (Helsinki)
- 1984 Women's Olympic 3,000 metres (Los Angeles)
- 1986 Women's European Championships 3,000 metres (Stuttgart)
- 1987 Women's World Championships 3,000 metres (Rome)
- 1988 Women's Olympic 3,000 metres (Seoul)
