= 1989 European Athletics Indoor Championships – Women's 3000 metres =

The women's 3000 metres event at the 1989 European Athletics Indoor Championships was held on 19 February.

== Results ==
| Rank | Name | Nationality | Time | Notes |
|---|---|---|---|---|
| 1st place, gold medalist(s) | Elly van Hulst | Netherlands | 9:10.01 | |
| 2nd place, silver medalist(s) | Nicky Morris | Great Britain | 9:12.37 | |
| 3rd place, bronze medalist(s) | Maricica Puică | Romania | 9:15.49 | |
| 4 | Zita Ágoston | Hungary | 9:18.93 | |
| | Vera Michallek | West Germany | DNF | |
