= Betty Jo Geiger =

American long-distance runner

Medal record

Women's athletics

Representing the United States

World Women's Road Race Championships
Silver medal – second place	1983 San Diego	10K race
Gold medal – first place	1983 San Diego	Team

World Cross Country Championships
Silver medal – second place	1981 Madrid	Team
Gold medal – first place	1983 Gateshead	Team
Gold medal – first place	1984 East Rutherford	Team
Gold medal – first place	1985 Lisbon	Team

Betty Jo Geiger (née Springs; born June 12, 1961) is an American former long-distance runner who competed in events ranging from 3000-meter run to the marathon.

Her greatest individual success was at the inaugural IAAF World Women's Road Race Championships in 1983, where she was runner-up to Britain's Wendy Sly and led the Americans to the team gold medal. Geiger was a key member of the national team at the IAAF World Cross Country Championships in the 1980s. Her first team medal – a silver – came at the 1981 championships and following that she helped the United States to three consecutive team titles in 1983, 1984 and 1985. She finished in the top ten on each occasion, being the number one American in 1983 and number two American athlete to Jan Merrill, Joan Benoit and Cathy Branta in the other years. She made one more appearance at the competition in 1986, and also represented her country at the Goodwill Games that year.

She was a four-time national champion, having won the 5000-meter run at the 1986 USA Outdoor Track and Field Championships (in a championship record time), the national 10K run three times (1984, 1985, and 1986) and the individual title at the USA Cross Country Championships. She attended North Carolina State University and won four NCAA Championships for the NC State Wolfpack team: a 5000/10,000 m double at the 1983 NCAA Women's Division I Outdoor Track and Field Championships and victories at the NCAA Women's Division I Cross Country Championship in 1981 and 1983. She won the Broderick Award (now the Honda Sports Award) as the nation's best female collegiate cross country runner in 1984. She was inducted into the NC State Athletic Hall of Fame in 2013.

Geiger competed extensively at professional road races and had wins at the Peachtree Road Race, Freihofer's Run for Women (three times), and Gate River Run, as well as runner-up finishes at the Falmouth Road Race and Gasparilla Distance Classic. She married her former college coach Rollie Geiger. In her youth she won the national junior title over 3000 m and was undefeated in Florida high school competitions, with 15 state titles for Bayshore High School in her native Bradenton.

== International competitions ==
Year	Competition	Venue	Position	Event	Notes
1981	World Cross Country Championships	Madrid, Spain	6th	Senior race	14:28
1981	World Cross Country Championships	Madrid, Spain	2nd	Team	36 pts
1983	World Cross Country Championships	Gateshead, United Kingdom	5th	Senior race	14:00
1983	World Cross Country Championships	Gateshead, United Kingdom	1st	Team	31 pts
1983	World Women's Road Race Championships	San Diego, United States	2nd	10 km	32:23
1983	World Women's Road Race Championships	San Diego, United States	1st	Team	14 pts
1984	World Cross Country Championships	East Rutherford, United States	9th	Senior race	16:20
1984	World Cross Country Championships	East Rutherford, United States	1st	Team	52 pts
1985	World Cross Country Championships	Lisbon, Portugal	9th	Senior race	15:44
1985	World Cross Country Championships	Lisbon, Portugal	1st	Team	42 pts
1986	World Cross Country Championships	Colombier, Switzerland	35th	Senior race	15:45.5
1986	World Cross Country Championships	Colombier, Switzerland	4th	Team	82 pts
1986	Goodwill Games	Moscow, Soviet Union	9th	5000 m	15:41.39

== National titles ==
- USA Outdoor Track and Field Championships
  - 5000 m: 1986
- USA Road Running Championships
  - 10K run: 1984, 1985, 1986
- USA Cross Country Championships
  - Long course: 1983
- NCAA Women's Division I Outdoor Track and Field Championships
  - 5000 m: 1983
  - 10,000 m: 1983
- NCAA Women's Division I Cross Country Championship
  - Individual: 1981, 1983
- USA Junior Outdoor Track and Field Championships
  - 3000 m: 1979

== Circuit wins ==
- Cinque Mulini: 1985
- Bislett Games
  - 5000 m: 1983
- Penn Relays
  - 3000 m: 1981
  - 5000 m: 1983
- Bonne Bell Mini Marathon: 1984
- Peachtree Road Race: 1984
- Freihofer's Run for Women: 1984, 1985, 1986
- Gate River Run: 1985
- Pittsburgh Great Race: 1988
- Capital City Marathon: 1983

== Personal bests ==
- 3000-meter run – 8:59.79 min (1983)
- 5000-meter run – 15:25.24 min (1985)
- 10,000-meter run – 32:33.04 min (1988)
- 10K run – 32:13 min (1986)
- 15K run – 49:25 min (1985)
- 10-mile run – 54:45 min (1988)
- Marathon – 2:37:14 hours (1983)

== See also ==
- List of 5000 metres national champions (women)
