= Cindy Bremser =

American middle-distance runner

Personal information
- Nickname: Queen Bee
- Born: Cynthia Mae Bremser; May 5, 1953 (age 73) Milwaukee, United States
- Height: 5 ft 3.5 in (161 cm)
- Weight: 112 lb (51 kg)

Sport
- Country: USA
- Sport: Middle distance running

Achievements and titles
- Personal bests: 1500 m: 4:04.09 3000 m: 8:38.60 5000 m: 15:11.78
Medal record
Women's Athletics
Representing the United States
Pan American Games
Silver medal – second place	1983 Caracas	1500 m

Cynthia ("Cindy") Mae Bremser–Whitmore (born May 5, 1953) is a retired middle distance runner from the United States. She finished fourth in the 3,000 metres at the 1984 Summer Olympics. She won the silver medal in the 1,500 metres at the 1983 Pan American Games.

Competing for the Wisconsin Badgers track and field team, Bremser finished 3rd in the mile run at the 1975 AIAW Outdoor Track and Field Championships.

== International competitions ==
Year	Competition	Venue	Position	Event	Notes
Representing United States
1975	Pan American Games	Mexico City, Mexico	4th	1500 m	4:31.73
1983	Pan American Games	Caracas, Venezuela	2nd	1500 m	4:17.67
1983	World Championships	Helsinki, Finland	16th (h)	1500 m	4:14.10
1984	Olympic Games	Los Angeles, United States	4th	3000 m	8:42.78
1985	World Cup	Canberra, Australia	3rd	3000 m	9:21.15
1986	Goodwill Games	Moscow, Soviet Union	8th	3000 m	8:53.74
1986	Goodwill Games	Moscow, Soviet Union	3rd	5000 m	15:11.78
1987	World Championships	Rome, Italy	21st (h)	3000 m	8:54.17
