= Susi Riermeier =

German cross-country skier (born 1960)

Personal information
- Nationality: German
- Born: 23 December 1960 (age 65) Munich, West Germany

Sport
- Sport: Cross-country skiing

Susi Riermeier (born 23 December 1960) is a German former cross-country skier and long-distance runner. She competed in two events at the 1980 Winter Olympics.

== Cross-country skiing results ==
All results are sourced from the International Ski Federation (FIS).

=== Olympic Games ===
Year	Age	5 km	10 km	4 × 5 km relay
1980	19	31	21	—

=== World Championships ===
Year	Age	5 km	10 km	20 km	4 × 5 km relay
1978	17	28	33	29	7

== Distance running ==
Riermeier competed at the 1983 IAAF World Women's Road Race Championships, finishing 61st, before going on to represent West Germany at the IAAF World Cross Country Championships twice in 1985 and 1986. She competed at the marathon distance and won the West German Athletics Championships in that event in 1984.
