= Kassa Balcha =

Ethiopian long-distance runner

Kassa Balcha (born 5 December 1955) is a retired Ethiopian long-distance runner.

At the 1985 World Cross Country Championships Balcha finished your in the long race. This was good enough to help Ethiopia win a gold medal in the team competition.

He competed in the men's 1500 metres at the 1980 Olympics, where he finished 6th in his heat and did not advance.
