= Eleonora de Mendonça =

Brazilian long-distance runner

Personal information
- Full name: Eleonora Costa Soares de Mendonça
- Born: 13 November 1948 (age 77) Rio de Janeiro, Brazil
- Height: 1.65 m (5 ft 5 in)
- Weight: 56 kg (123 lb)

Sport
- Sport: Long-distance running
- Event: Marathon

Eleonora Costa Soares de Mendonça (born 13 November 1948) is a Brazilian long-distance runner. She competed in the women's marathon at the 1984 Summer Olympics.

== International competitions ==
| Year | Competition | Venue | Position | Event | Notes |
Representing Brazil
| 1974 | South American Championships | Santiago, Chile | 5th | 1500 m | 4:54.6 |
| 1978 | New York City Marathon | Santiago, Chile | 5th | Marathon | 2:48:45 |
| 1983 | World Road Race Championships | San Diego, California | 58th | 10 km | 37:18 |
| 1984 | Olympic Games | Santiago, Chile | 44th | Marathon | 2:52:19 |

== Personal bests ==
- Marathon – 2:48:45 (1978)
