= 1983 IAAF World Women's Road Race Championships =

The 1983 IAAF World Women's Road Race Championships was the inaugural edition of the annual international road running competition organised by the International Amateur Athletics Federation (IAAF). The competition was hosted by the United States on December 3, 1983 in San Diego, California and featured one race only: a 10k run for women. There were individual and team awards available, with the national team rankings being decided by the combined score of a team's three best athletes. Countries with fewer than three finishers were not ranked.

Wendy Sly of Great Britain was the winner of the race in a time of 32:23 minutes. She was followed by two Americans, Betty Springs and Lesley Welch. The United States won the team competition, with the third American runner Ellen Hart Peña also placing in the top ten. Canada, led by fourth-placer Nancy Tinari, was second in the team competition and Monica Joyce led the Irish women to the team bronze medal. A total of 66 women from 18 countries entered the race and 62 finished the distance. Nine nations entered more than three athletes and eight of these reached the team rankings with three finishing athletes (England being the exception). The United States had the largest contingent, with 16 entrants. The Soviet Union's Raisa Sadreydinova was a prominent entrant, having set a 10,000 metres world record earlier that year, but she failed to finish.

The competition proved a development in global level competitions for women in long-distance running: the launch of this race was a push by the IAAF to the International Olympic Committee to gain Olympic recognition of this distance for women. A women's race was subsequently added for the 10,000 metres at the Olympics in 1988, following on from the first Olympic marathon for women in 1984.

== Results ==
=== Individual ===
Rank	Athlete	Country	Time (m:s)
1st place, gold medalist(s)	Wendy Sly	Great Britain (GBR)	32:23
2nd place, silver medalist(s)	Betty Springs	United States (USA)	32:23
3rd place, bronze medalist(s)	Lesley Lehane	United States (USA)	32:41
4	Nancy Tinari	Canada (CAN)	32:57
5	Dorthe Rasmussen	Denmark (DEN)	33:03
6	Midde Hamrin	Sweden (SWE)	33:06
7	Silvia Ruegger	Canada (CAN)	33:06
8	Monica Joyce	Ireland (IRL)	33:14
9	Ellen Hart Peña	United States (USA)	33:15
10	Lisa Martin	Australia (AUS)	33:19
11	Debbie Peel	Great Britain (GBR)	33:25
12	Suzanne Girard	United States (USA)	33:25
13	Anna Marie Malone	Canada (CAN)	33:38
14	Alba Milana	Italy (ITA)	33:40
15	Carey Edge	Ireland (IRL)	33:47
16	Jan Merrill	United States (USA)	33:51
17	Monika Schäfer	West Germany (FRG)	33:51
18	Carol McLatchie	United States (USA)	33:56
19	Regina Joyce	Ireland (IRL)	33:57
20	Lizanne Bussières	Canada (CAN)	33:58
21	Jacqueline Gareau	Canada (CAN)	33:58
22	Michele Bush	United States (USA)	34:01
23	Glenys Quick	New Zealand (NZL)	34:05
24	Francine Peeters	Belgium (BEL)	34:07
25	Lisa Brady	United States (USA)	34:11
26	Raisa Smekhnova	Soviet Union (URS)	34:12
27	Christina Mai	West Germany (FRG)	34:13
28	Sara Harnett	New Zealand (NZL)	34:18
29	Mary Knisely	United States (USA)	34:19
30	Elly van Hulst	Netherlands (NED)	34:31
31	Magda Ilands	Belgium (BEL)	34:33
32	Anna-Maria Tweedie	New Zealand (NZL)	34:38
33	Nancy Conz	United States (USA)	34:45
34	Rhonda Mallinder	Australia (AUS)	34:54
35	Rita Marchisio	Italy (ITA)	34:59
36	Gabriela Górzyńska	Poland (POL)	35:00
37	Eryn Forbes	United States (USA)	35:07
38	Nancy Ditz	United States (USA)	35:10
39	Laura Fogli	Italy (ITA)	35:15
41	Elvira Hofmann	West Germany (FRG)	35:23
42	Winnie Ng	Hong Kong (HKG)	35:24
44	Noriko Yamada	Japan (JPN)	35:27
45	Patricia English	United States (USA)	35:30
46	Marica Mrsic	Yugoslavia (YUG)	35:34
49	Joke van Gerwen	Netherlands (NED)	35:43
50	Maria Curatolo	Italy (ITA)	35:49
51	Melinda Ireland	United States (USA)	35:53
52	Kimberly Griffin	United States (USA)	36:02
53	Eefje van Wissen	Netherlands (NED)	36:05
54	Bonnie Tamis	United States (USA)	36:24
55	Anna Krol	Poland (POL)	36:43
57	Wilma Rusman	Netherlands (NED)	37:05
58	Eleonora de Mendonça	Brazil (BRA)	37:18
59	Ewa Wrzosek	Poland (POL)	37:38
60	Renata Walendziak	Poland (POL)	37:40
61	Susanne Riermeier	West Germany (FRG)	37:43
62	Yvonne Murray	Great Britain (GBR)	38:28
—	Cynthia Hamilton	Canada (CAN)	DNF
—	Raisa Sadreydinova	Soviet Union (URS)	DNF
—	Ruth Partridge	Great Britain (GBR)	DNF
—	Heather Thomson	New Zealand (NZL)	DNF

=== Team ===
Rank	Team	Points
1st place, gold medalist(s)	United States; Betty Springs, Lesley Welch, Ellen Hart Peña	14
2nd place, silver medalist(s)	Canada,	24
3rd place, bronze medalist(s)	Ireland,	42
4	Great Britain,	74
5	New Zealand,	83
6	West Germany,	85
7	Italy,	88
8	Netherlands,	132
9	Poland,	150
