= Freihofer's Run for Women =

Road running competition in Albany, New York

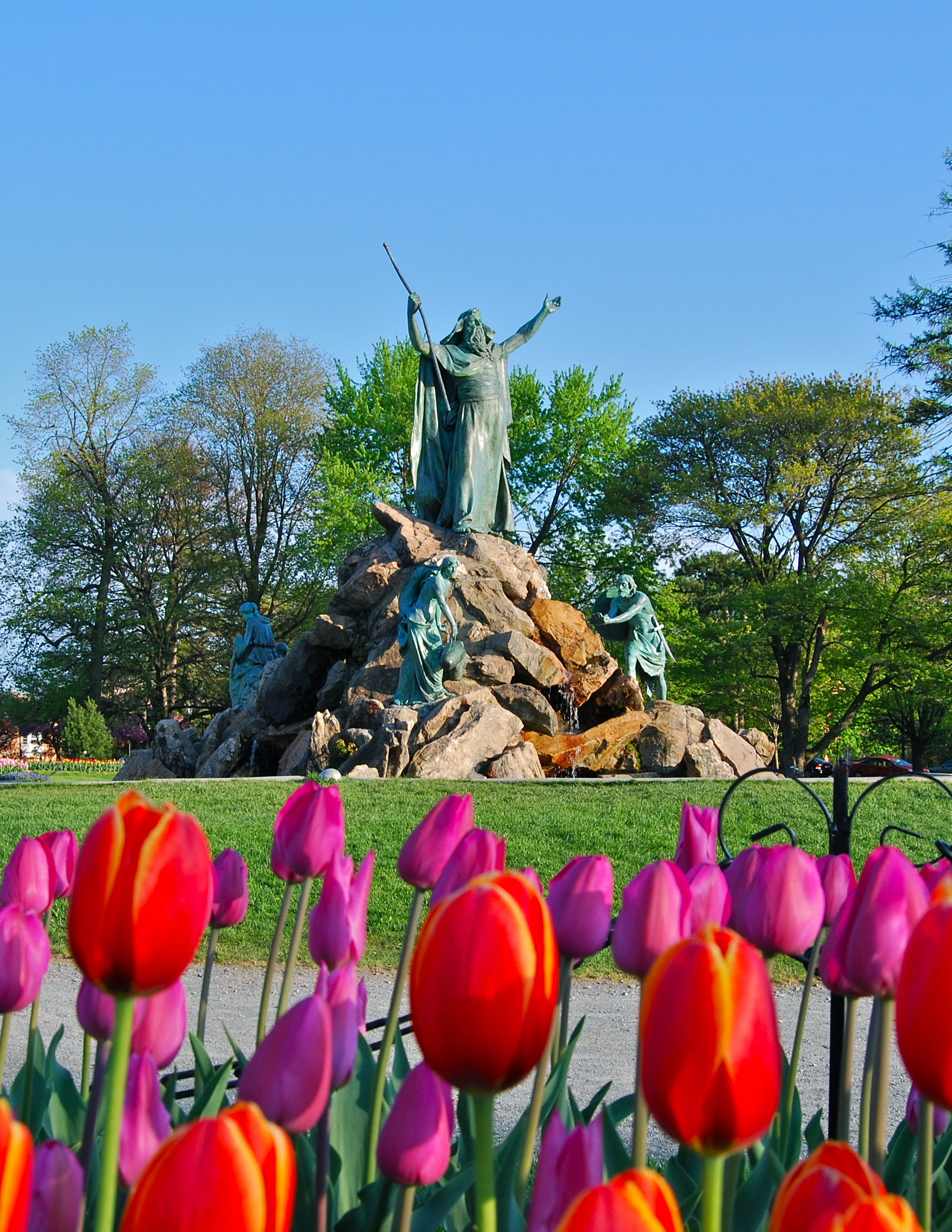
- The race passes through Albany's Washington Park.
- Date: May/June
- Location: Albany, New York, United States
- Event type: Road
- Distance: 5K
- Established: 1979
- Website: Freihofer's Run for Women

The Delightful® Run for Women (formerly Freihofer's Run for Women) is an annual five-kilometer road running competition for women that is usually held in late May or early June in Albany, New York, United States. First held in 1979, the race has grown into a sizable event that holds IAAF Silver Label Road Race status and had 3,927 participants at the 2010 edition. The 2011 edition garnered 5,000 entries, four-fifths of whom were distance runners.

A 10-kilometer race was held concurrently with the 5K race from its inaugural edition, with the longer race serving as the elite race until 1989. The 5K race has been the elite race since 1989 while the 10K was removed from the annual race's events in 1991. The race has been the venue for the national road championships on many occasions: acting as the 10K championships from 1979 to 1988, and then serving as the 5K nationals in 1989, 1990 and 1993 to 2004. Five women have participated in the Run for Women every year since it began, including Denise Herman, a local runner who won the 5k in 1984 and again in 1987.

Lynn Jennings is the race's most successful runner, having won the 10K race twice and the 5K race a further six times over the period between 1987 and 1998. Marla Runyan, who is legally blind due to Stargardt disease, won three consecutive national titles at the Freihofer's Run for Women from 2002 to 2004.

In 2005, the race was won in record time by Asmae Leghzaoui, though several world class athletes boycotted the event due to Leghzaoui's history of using illegal substances. Her course record was broken by Emily Chebet who ran a time of 15:12 to win the 2010 race. Betty Jo Geiger remains the record holder for the 10K race with her 1986 winning time of 32:13.

For many years the 5K course, certified by USA Track & Field, began and ended near the New York State Museum on Albany's Madison Avenue. It headed west entering Washington Park after the first kilometer. The course twisted along the footpaths through the park before heading north along Lake Avenue around the half-way point. After heading east along Western and Washington Avenue, the route turned south, looping back onto Madison Avenue, and then headed downhill directly to the finish. The course now starts on Washington Avenue, in front of Albany City Hall and in the shadow of the New York State Capitol. The 5k (and 3K) run up Washington before turning into Washington Park for a scenic loop. The race exits the park back onto Washington for a fast downhill finish.

In 2024 the sponsor changed from Freihofer's to Sara Lee® Delightful® Bread. The race continues to offer bread (Sara Lee Delightful) and a box of cookies (Freihofer's) to all participants (including cookies for the Capital Kids 3K and Kids Runs). A popular health and fitness expo is held on the Thursday and Friday before the event at the Armory at Russell Sage College.

== Past winners ==
=== 5K race ===
Key: Course record Country's championship race Amateur races

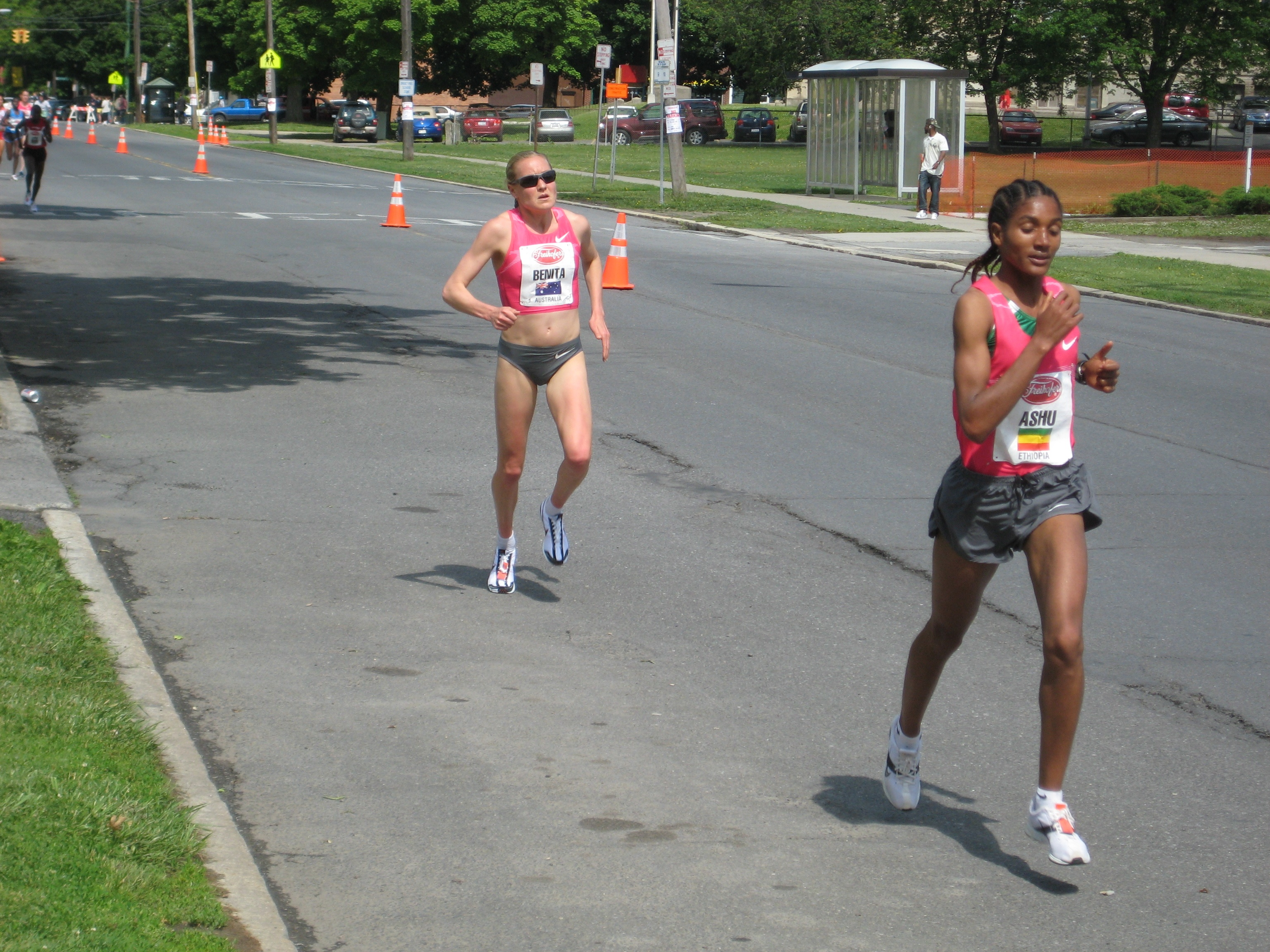
Benita Johnson and Ashu Kasim racing at the 2009 edition

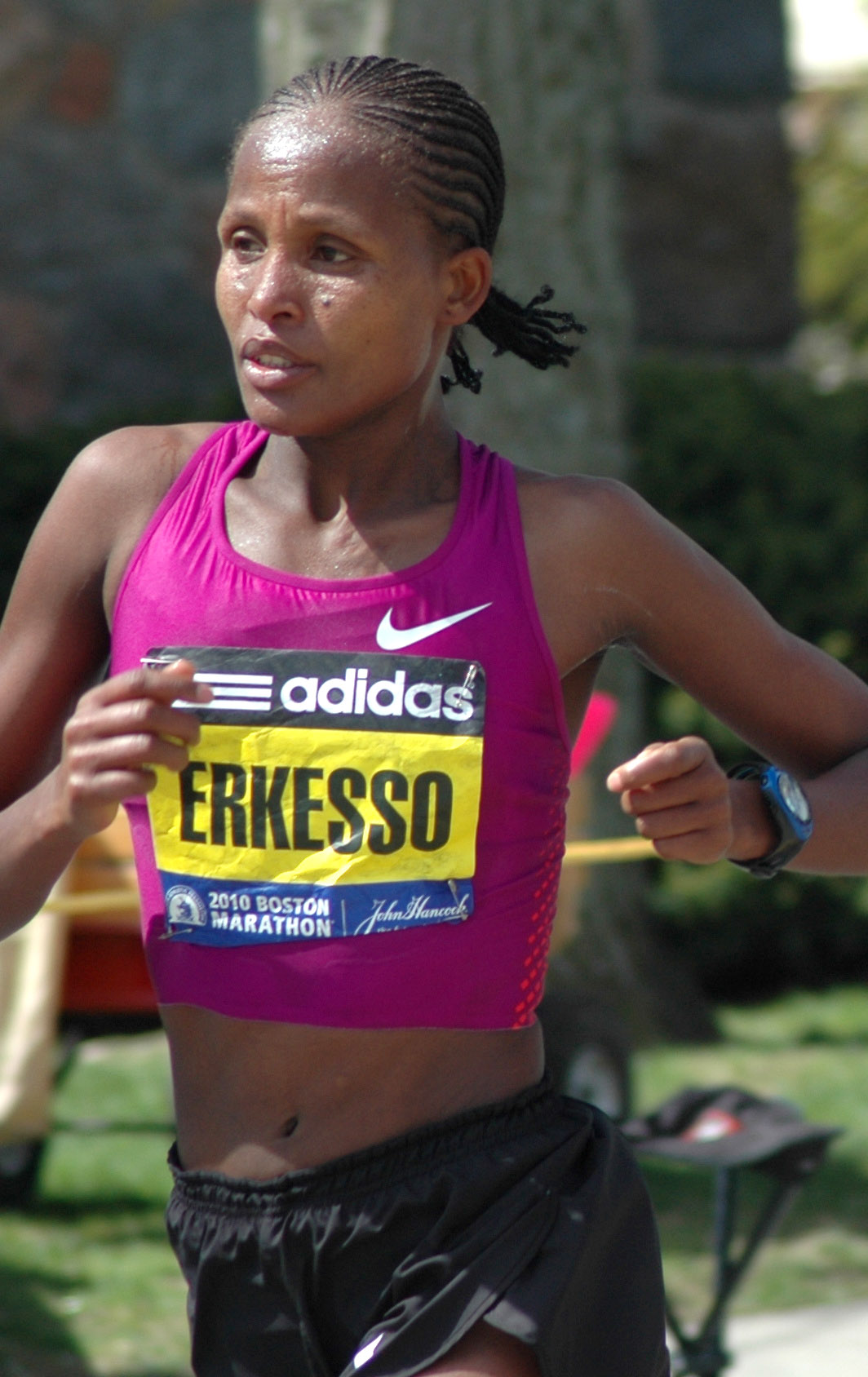
Teyba Erkesso of Ethiopia was the 2009 race winner.

Year	Winner	Time (m:s)
2025	Molly Born (USA)	15:31
2024	Keira D'Amato (USA)	15:41
2023	Tristin Van Ord (USA)	15:54
2022	Allie Ostrander (USA)	15:48
2021	Aisling Cuffe (USA)	16:34
2019	Elaina Tabb (USA)	16:03
2018	Sarah Pagano (USA)	15:48
2017	Sara Hall (USA)	15:49
2016	Brianne Nelson (USA)	15:46
2015	Emily Chebet (KEN)	15:38
2014	Lucy Kabuu (KEN)	15:20
2013	Emily Chebet (KEN)	15:26
2012	Mamitu Daska (ETH)	15:19.1
2011	Mamitu Daska (ETH)	15:19
2010	Emily Chebet (KEN)	15:12
2009	Teyba Erkesso (ETH)	15:27
2008	Benita Johnson (AUS)	15:46
2007	Benita Johnson (AUS)	15:22
2006	Benita Johnson (AUS)	15:27
2005	Asmae Leghzaoui (MAR)	15:18
2004	Marla Runyan (USA)	15:26
2003	Marla Runyan (USA)	15:25
2002	Marla Runyan (USA)	15:27
2001	Collette Liss-Douglas (USA)	15:47
2000	Libbie Johnson-Hickman (USA)	15:35
1999	Cheri Goddard-Kenah (USA)	15:31
1998	Lynn Jennings (USA)	15:46
1997	Elva Dryer (USA)	15:29
1996	Lynn Jennings (USA)	15:21
1995	Lynn Jennings (USA)	15:24
1994	Lynn Jennings (USA)	15:35
1993	Lynn Jennings (USA)	15:35
1992	Carmem de Oliveira (BRA)	15:39
1991	Judi St. Hilaire (USA)	15:40
1990	Lynn Jennings (USA)	15:31
1989	Judi St. Hilaire (USA)	15:25
1988	Pamela Crandall (USA)	17:16
1987	Denise Herman (USA)	17:16
1986	Marisa Sutera (USA)	17:22
1985	Patricia Nelson (USA)	17:39
1984	Denise Herman (USA)	18:06
1983	Mary Herlihy (USA)	18:08
1982	Diana Richburg (USA)	18:30
1981	Diana Richburg (USA)	18:50
1980	Martha Swatt-Johnson (USA)	17:35
1979	Martha Swatt-Johnson (USA)	17:30

=== 10K race ===
Year	Winner	Time (m:s)
1991	Nancy Egerton (USA)	38:06
1990	Lisa Polzinetti (USA)	36:25
1989	Laura LaMena (USA)	37:04
1988	Lynn Jennings (USA)	32:39
1987	Lynn Jennings (USA)	32:19
1986	Betty Jo Geiger (USA)	32:13
1985	Betty Jo Geiger (USA); Francie Larrieu Smith (USA)	32:14
1984	Janice Ettle (USA)	34:22
1983	Regina Joyce (IRL)	33:25
1982	Jacqueline Gareau (CAN)	34:50
1981	Nancy Conz (USA)	34:59
1980	Dana Slater (USA)	33:22
1979	Karin von Berg (USA)	34:26

== Statistics ==
- Note: Statistics for elite races only

=== Winners by country ===
Country	5K race	10K race	Total
United States	15	9	24
Australia	3	0	3
Ethiopia	3	0	3
Kenya	3	0	3
Brazil	1	0	1
Morocco	1	0	1
Canada	0	1	1
Ireland	0	1	1

=== Multiple winners ===
Runner	Country	5K wins	10K wins	Total
Lynn Jennings	United States	6	2	8
Betty Jo Geiger	United States	0	3	3
Marla Runyan	United States	3	0	3
Benita Johnson	Australia	3	0	3
Judi St. Hilaire	United States	2	0	2
Mamitu Daska	Ethiopia	2	0	2
Emily Chebet	Kenya	3	0	3
