= Maricica Puică =

Romanian middle-distance runner (born 1950)

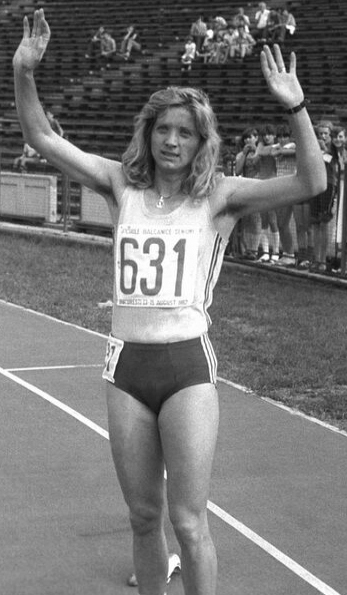
- Puică in 1982

Personal information
- Born: 29 July 1950 (age 76) Iași, Romania
- Height: 168 cm (5 ft 6 in)
- Weight: 54 kg (119 lb)

Sport
- Sport: Athletics
- Event: 1000–3000 m

Achievements and titles
- Personal bests: 1000 m – 2:31.5 (1986); 1500 m – 3:57.22 (1984); 3000 m – 8:27.83 (1985)
Medal record
Women's athletics
Representing Romania
Olympic Games
Gold medal – first place	1984 Los Angeles	3000 m
Bronze medal – third place	1984 Los Angeles	1500 m
World Championships
Silver medal – second place	1987 Rome	3000 m
World Indoor Championships
Bronze medal – third place	1987 Indianapolis	3000 m
World Cross Country Championships
Gold medal – first place	1982 Rome	Women's race
Gold medal – first place	1984 East Rutherford	Women's race
Bronze medal – third place	1978 Glasgow	Women's race
European Championships
Silver medal – second place	1982 Athens	3000 m
Silver medal – second place	1986 Stuttgart	3000 m
Summer Universiade
Bronze medal – third place	1977 Sofia	1500 m

Maricica Puică, née Luca, (born 29 July 1950) is a retired Romanian middle-distance runner. She is the 1984 Olympic champion in the 3,000 metres. One of the greatest female middle-distance runners of the 1980s, she also twice won the World Cross Country Championship (1982, 1984) and broke the world record for the mile in 1982.

== Career ==
Puică was born in Iași, Romania and competed at the 1976 Montreal Olympics and the 1980 Moscow Olympics, where she finished seventh in the 1,500 m. In 1978, she placed fourth in the 3,000 m at the European Championships. In March 1982, she won the IAAF World Cross Country Championships. In August, she won a silver medal in the 3,000 m at the European Championships behind Svetlana Ulmasova. She also finished fourth in the 1,500 m final. A month later in September, she broke Mary Decker's world mile record of 4:18.08 with 4:17.44 in Rieti.

Puică missed the 1983 World Championships due to injury, but returned in early 1984 to win her second World Cross Country Championship title. Then in the Summer, she won the inaugural 3,000 m title at the 1984 Los Angeles Olympics, a race remembered more for the collision of Mary Decker and Zola Budd. At those Games, she also won a bronze medal in the 1,500 m behind Italy's Gabriella Dorio and Romanian teammate Doina Melinte.

In July 1986, at the London Grand Prix, she broke Tatyana Kazankina's world 2,000 m record of 5:28.72, with a time of 5:28.69. At the 1986 European Championships in Stuttgart, she won a silver medal in the 3,000 m, behind Olga Bondarenko of the Soviet Union. She was also fifth in the 1,500 m final. 1987 began with her winning a bronze medal in the 3,000 m at the World Indoor Championships in Indianapolis, finishing behind the Soviet pair of Tatyana Samolenko and Bondarenko. Later that year, aged 37, she won a silver medal in the 3000 m at the World Championships in Rome, again behind Samolenko.

Puica competed at her fourth and final Olympic Games in Seoul 1988, where she dropped out of her 3000 m heat with just 200 metres to go.

In 1989, she spoke on Romanian television in support of the revolutionaries fighting against the regime of Nicolae Ceaușescu.

== International competitions ==
Year	Competition	Venue	Position	Event	Notes
Representing Romania
1976	Olympic Games	Montreal, Canada	heats	1500 m	4:12.62
1978	World Cross Country Championships	Glasgow, Scotland	3rd		
1978	European Championships	Prague, Czech Republic	4th	3000 m	8:40.9
1980	Olympic Games	Moscow, Russia	7th	1500 m	4:01.26
1981	World Cup	Rome, Italy	2nd	3000 m	8:55.80
1982	European Indoor Championships	Milan, Italy	2nd	3000 m	8:54.26
1982	World Cross Country Championships	Rome, Italy	1st		
1982	European Championships	Athens, Greece	4th	1500 m	3:59.31
1982	European Championships	Athens, Greece	2nd	3000 m	8:33.33
1984	World Cross Country Championships	New York, United States	1st		
1984	Olympic Games	Los Angeles, United States	3rd	1500 m	4:04.15
1984	Olympic Games	Los Angeles, United States	1st	3000 m	8:35.96
1986	European Championships	Stuttgart, Germany	5th	1500 m	4:03.90
1986	European Championships	Stuttgart, Germany	2nd	3000 m	8:35.92
1987	World Indoor Championships	Indianapolis, United States	3rd	3000 m	8:47.92
1987	World Championships	Rome, Italy	2nd	3000 m	8:39.45
1988	Olympic Games	Seoul, South Korea	heats	3000 m	DNF
1989	European Indoor Championships	The Hague, Netherlands	3rd	3000 m	9:15.49

Records
Preceded by Mary Decker-Tabb	Women's mile world record holder 9 September 1982 – 21 August 1985	Succeeded by Mary Decker-Slaney
Sporting positions
Preceded by (Soviet Union) Yelena Sipatova	Women's 3000 m Best Year Performance; 1981	Succeeded by (Soviet Union) Svetlana Ulmasova
