= Vera Michallek =

German long-distance runner

Vera Michelle (née Steiert; born 6 November 1958) is a retired (West) German middle and long-distance runner, born in Lindau.

In her early career she competed in 3000 metres at the 1983 World Championships, without advancing from the heats. She finished fourth at the 1982 European Indoor Championships and also fourth at the 1983 European Indoor Championships.

She later started doubling in both 1500 and 3000 metres. At the 1986 European Championships she did not reach the 1500 metres final, but finished tenth in the 3000 metres final. The same thing happened at the 1987 World Championships, only with an eleventh place in the 3000 final. At the 1988 Olympics she did not progress, neither from the 1500 nor the 3000 heat.

Her indoor success continued. She finished fourth at the 1987 European Indoor Championships, won the silver medal at the 1988 European Indoor Championships, fourth at the 1989 World Indoor Championships, but did not finish the 1989 European Indoor Championships.

Michallek became West German half marathon champion in 1984, 1500 metres champion in 1988 and 1990, 3000 metres champion in 1988 and cross-country running champion in 1987 (short race). Indoors she became West German 1500 metres champion 1986, 1987 and 1989 as well as 3000 metres champion in 1988 and 1989. She represented the clubs ASV Köln, LG Ahlen-Hamm, LG Frankfurt, Eintracht Frankfurt and LAC Quelle Fürth.

His personal best times were 4:04.29 minutes in the 1500 metres, achieved in August 1986 in Köln; 4:32.12 minutes in the mile run, achieved in June 1988 in Bratislava; 8:47.62 minutes in the 3000 metres, achieved in July 1988 in Stockholm; and 15:41.68 minutes in the 5000 metres, achieved in September 1986 in Gelnhausen. Indoors she had a somewhat better 3000 metres time of 8:46.97 minutes (1988). In the mile run she holds a German indoor record.
