= Wendy Sly =

British athlete (born 1959)

Wendy Sly née Smith MBE
Personal information
- Born: Wendy Smith; 5 November 1959 (age 66) Hampton, London, England
- Height: 168 cm (5 ft 6 in)
- Weight: 52 kg (115 lb)

Sport
- Sport: Athletics
- Club: Borough of Hounslow Athletics Club; Brooks Racing Team (USA)
Medal record
Women's Athletics
Representing Great Britain
Olympic Games
Silver medal – second place	1984 Los Angeles	3,000 metres
World Road Race Championships
Gold medal – first place	1983 San Diego	10 km
Representing England
Commonwealth Games
Silver medal – second place	1982 Brisbane	3,000m

Wendy Sly MBE (née Smith, born 5 November 1959) is a British former athlete, who competed mainly in the 3000 metres. She won a silver medal in the event at the 1984 Los Angeles Olympics. She won the 1983 10km World Road Race Championships in San Diego.

== Biography ==
Sly was born in Hampton, Greater London, England. She attended Spelthorne College, then studied English literature at Loughborough University from 1978 to 1981.

In 1978, as Wendy Smith, she finished 43rd at the World Cross Country Championships, and won a team bronze medal. In 1980, she was the UK number one in the 3000 metres and finished second in the 1500 metres at the UK Championships. In 1982, at the Commonwealth Games in Brisbane, she won a silver medal in the 3000 metres, running 8:48.47 behind Anne Audain.

In 1983, now competing as Wendy Sly, she finished fifth in the finals of both the 1500 metres and the 3000 metres at the inaugural World Championships in Helsinki. She ran her lifetime bests in both events, 4:04.14 in the 1500 m and 8:37.06 in the 3000 m. Also that year, she won the IAAF World Women's Road Race Championships in San Diego contested over 10 km.

At her first Olympic Games in 1984 in Los Angeles, Sly won a silver medal in the 3000 metres, a race most remembered for the collision between Mary Decker and Zola Budd, with whom she had a strong rivalry. She ran a season's best of 8:39.47.

Sly represented England again in the 3,000 metres event, at the 1986 Commonwealth Games in Edinburgh, Scotland, finishing eighth. Sly became the British 3000 metre champion after winning the British WAAA Championships title at the 1987 WAAA Championships.

Sly finished eighth in the 1987 World Championships 3000 metres final in Rome. Then at her second Olympics in Seoul, she finished seventh in the 3000 metres final in 8:37.70, her fastest time in five years.

Sly represented England in the 10,000 metres event at the 1990 Commonwealth Games in Auckland, New Zealand, but did not finish.

As of 2019, Sly still ranks in the UK all-time top 10 lists in the 3000 metres (9th with 8:37.06 1983), 10 km road (4th with 31:29 in 1983) and 15 km road (4th with 48:17 in 1985).

She was appointed Member of the Order of the British Empire (MBE) in the 2015 New Year Honours for services to athletics.

== Personal life ==
She married middle-distance runner Chris Sly in 1982. In 1997, she had a son, Max Heath. In 2013, she married her long-term partner, Andrew, whom she met through working together for her former university colleague and friend Sebastian Coe.

== National titles ==
- 1986 UK 3000 metres Champion
- 1987 AAA Championships 3000 metres Champion
- 1988 AAAs Indoor 3000 metres Champion

== International competitions ==
Year	Competition	Venue	Position	Event	Notes
1978	World Cross Country Championships	Glasgow, Scotland	43rd	4.7 km	
1981	World Cross Country Championships	Madrid, Spain	65th	4.4 km	
1982	Commonwealth Games	Brisbane, Australia	2nd	3000 m	8:48.47
1983	World Championships	Helsinki, Finland	5th	1500 m	4:04.14
1983	World Championships	Helsinki, Finland	5th	3000 m	8:37.06
1983	World Women's Road Race Championships	San Diego, United States	1st	10 km	32:23
1984	Olympic Games	Los Angeles, United States	2nd	3000 m	8:39.47
1986	Commonwealth Games	Edinburgh, Scotland	8th	3000 m	9:14.04
1987	World Championships	Rome, Italy	8th	3000 m	8:45.85
1988	Olympic Games	Seoul, South Korea	7th	3000 m	8:37.70
1990	Commonwealth Games	Auckland, New Zealand	DNF	10,000 m	—
