= Zola Budd =

South African runner (born 1966)

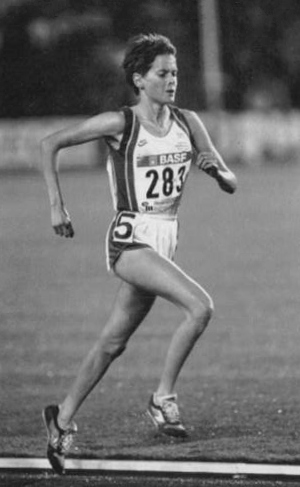
- Budd at the 1986 European Championships

Personal information
- Citizenship: South Africa, United Kingdom
- Born: 26 May 1966 (age 60) Bloemfontein, South Africa
- Height: 164 cm (5 ft 5 in)
- Weight: 48 kg (106 lb)
- Children: 3

Sport
- Sport: Athletics
- Event: 800 m – marathon
- Club: Aldershot, Farnham & District AC

Achievements and titles
- Personal bests: 800 m – 2:00.9h (1984); 1500 m – 3:59.96 (1985); 1 mile – 4:17.57 (1985); 3000 m – 8:28.83 (1985); 5000 m – 14:48.07 (1985); 10,000 – 36:44.88 (2012); Half marathon – 1:11:04 (1997); Marathon – 2:55:39 (2012)
Medal record
Women's Cross Country
Representing England
World Cross Country Championships
Gold medal – first place	1985 Lisbon	Individual Women
Gold medal – first place	1986 Neuchâtel	Individual Women

Zola Budd (also known as Zola Pieterse; born 26 May 1966) is a South African middle-distance and long-distance runner. She competed at the 1984 Olympic Games for Great Britain and the 1992 Olympic Games for South Africa, both times in the 3000 metres. In 1984 (unratified) and 1985, she broke the world record in the 5000 metres. She was also a two-time winner at the World Cross Country Championships (1985–1986). Budd mainly trained and raced barefoot. Her mile best of 4:17.57 in 1985 stood as the British record for 38 years until Laura Muir ran 4:15.24 on 21 July 2023.

She returned to South Africa in 1989, and represented South Africa at the 1992 Summer Olympics. She moved with her family to South Carolina, USA in 2008; and competed at marathons and ultramarathons. She moved back to South Africa in 2020–2021.

== Athletics career ==
=== 5000 metres world record ===
Budd, who was born in Bloemfontein, Orange Free State, South Africa, achieved fame in early 1984, at the age of 17, when she broke the 5000 m world record with a time of 15:01.83. Since her performance took place in South Africa, then excluded from international athletics competition due to apartheid, the International Amateur Athletics Federation (IAAF) refused to ratify Budd's time as an official world record.

In 1985, she claimed the world record officially, while representing Great Britain, clocking 14:48.07.

=== Arrival in Britain ===
The Daily Mail, a British tabloid newspaper, persuaded Budd's father to encourage her to apply for registration as a British citizen, on the grounds that her grandfather was British, to circumvent the international sporting boycott of South Africa, so that she could compete in the 1984 Summer Olympics in Los Angeles. With a strong push from the Daily Mail, registration as a British citizen was granted in short order and she moved to Guildford. Her application and arrival was controversial due to her acquiring a passport so quickly. Groups supporting the abolition of apartheid campaigned to highlight the rapid treatment she received; applicants for naturalisation typically had to wait years for their applications to be considered.

Shortly afterwards, Budd was forced to pull out of a 1500 metres race in Crawley, Sussex, when the town council withdrew their invitation at short notice. The race was part of the inaugural event for the town's new Bewbush Leisure Centre and Mayor Alf Pegler said members of the council had expressed misgivings that the local significance of the event would be overshadowed by "political connotations and anti-apartheid demonstrators".

She ran her first competitive race on the cinder track at Central Park in Dartford, Kent, covering 3000 m in 9:02.6 in a race shown live on the BBC's Grandstand. She ran in further races in Britain, including the UK Championships 1500 m (won in 4:04) and the 3000 m in the UK Olympic trials, which she won in 8:40, earning a place on the British Olympic team. In the 2000 m at Crystal Palace in July 1984 she set a new world record of 5:33.15. Commenting during the race for the BBC, David Coleman exclaimed, "The message will now be flashed around the world – Zola Budd is no myth."

In Britain, Budd trained at Aldershot, Farnham and District Athletics Club.

=== 1984 Olympic 3000 metres ===
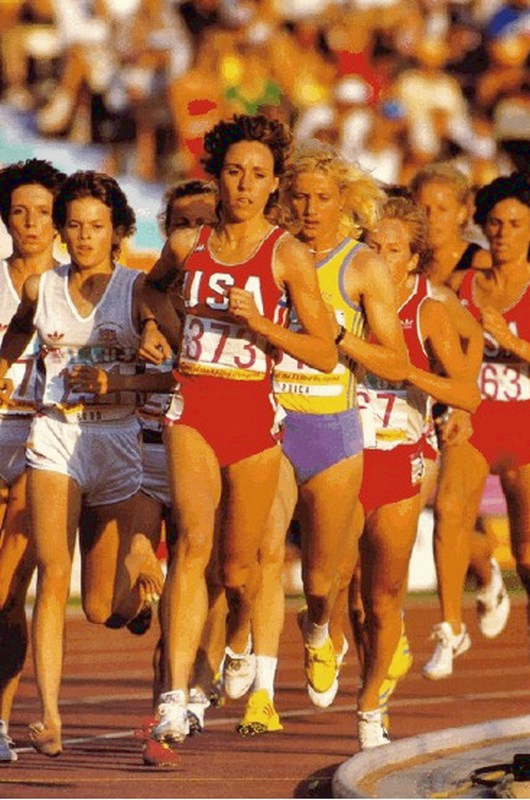
Budd (barefoot), Decker, and Puică leading the 3000 m race at the 1984 Olympics

In the 1984 Olympics, held in Los Angeles, California, the media billed the 3000 m race as a duel between Budd and world champion Mary Decker of USA. However, experts expected that Decker's main competition would be Romanian Maricica Puică, who had set the fastest time that year.

Decker set a fast pace from the gun with Budd in close pursuit, followed by Puică and Britain's Wendy Sly. When the pace slowed just past the midway point, Budd took the lead on the straight and ran wide of the pack around the turn. Setting the pace, she took herself, Decker, Sly and Puică clear of the pack. Running as a group was an unusual situation for Budd and Decker, both of whom were used to running in front and well ahead of other competitors.

At 1700 metres, the first collision occurred. Decker came into contact with one of Budd's legs, knocking Budd slightly off balance. However, both women maintained their close position. Five strides on, at race time of 4:58, Budd and Decker again made contact, with Budd's left foot brushing Decker's thigh, causing Budd to lose her balance and sending her into Decker's path. Decker's spiked running shoe came down hard into Budd's ankle, just above the heel, drawing blood. Videotapes later examined by Olympic officials showed Budd visibly in pain. However, she maintained equilibrium and kept stride.

Decker stepped on Budd; then, shortly after, she collided with the British runner and fell to the curb, injuring her hip. The fall ended Decker's race, and she was carried off the track in tears by her boyfriend (and later, husband), British discus thrower Richard Slaney.

Budd, deeply affected by the occurrence, continued to lead for a while, but faded, finishing seventh. Her finishing time of 8:48 was well outside her best of 8:37. Budd tried to apologise to Decker in the tunnel after the race, but Decker was upset, and replied, "Don't bother!" Puică won, with Sly second, and Canada's Lynn Williams third.

An International Association of Athletics Federations (IAAF) jury found that she was not responsible for the collision. Decker said many years after the event: "The reason I fell, some people think she tripped me deliberately. I happen to know that wasn't the case at all. The reason I fell is because I am and was very inexperienced in running in a pack."

In general, it is the trailing athlete's responsibility to avoid contact with the runner ahead; whether or not Budd had sufficient control of the race to have pulled into the curve as she did was hotly disputed. "This doesn't mean," track journalist Kenny Moore wrote in the aftermath, "that a leader can swerve in with impunity, but that in the give and take of pack running, athletes learn to make allowances."

In 2002, the moment was ranked 93rd in Channel 4's 100 Greatest Sporting Moments. On an episode of Celebrity Come Dine with Me, Budd stated that she had never seen footage of the collision. Budd and Decker later reunited for a 2016 documentary about the incident, The Fall.

=== International competition ===
Budd competed internationally for the UK in 1985 and 1986. In February 1985, she was World Cross Country Champion (beating Ingrid Kristiansen), but then went on to several track defeats. The most significant of these was her rematch with Mary Decker-Slaney at Crystal Palace in July 1985, in which she finished fourth, some 13 seconds behind Decker-Slaney.

After this race she then went on to break the UK and Commonwealth records for the 1500 m (in 3:59.96), the mile (4:17.57), the 3000m (8:28.83) and the 5000m (14:48.07). This last reduced the world record by ten seconds. She was also victor in the European Cup 3000m. Her best times in the 1500m, mile run and 3000m were set in races with Decker-Slaney and Maricica Puică. Budd finished third in all three races, with Decker-Slaney and Puică consistently coming first and second, respectively.

1986 began with a defence of her World Cross Country title and a world indoor 3000m record of 8:39.79. After a couple of victories in fast early season times over 1500m (4:01.93) and 3000m (8:34.72), her outdoor track season brought several defeats by athletes she should have beaten easily. She competed in both the 1500m and 3000m at the European Championships but did not win a medal in either, finishing ninth and fourth, respectively. It later emerged that Budd was suffering a painful leg injury for much of the season and she barely competed in 1987 as she sought treatment for this.

== Personal life ==
=== Suspension, return to South Africa, and marriage ===
In 1988, Budd began to compete again with a handful of cross-country runs. However, several African nations claimed she had competed in an event in South Africa, which, at the time, was prohibited by IAAF rule 53i because of South Africa's policy of apartheid, and insisted she be suspended from competition. Budd said she only attended the event and did not compete. The IAAF upheld the charge, stating:

In the opinion of the council, a person may 'take part' in an athletics event, without actually competing, in several ways. […] What is required is for a person to be present in a capacity more than that of a mere spectator. From the information before the council, including Miss Budd's affidavit, it was clear that Miss Budd greatly exceeded the bounds of being a mere spectator at the cross-country meeting at Brakpan. Not only was she there in her training gear, but she trained on and near the course, in full view of the crowd, and at one stage, by her own admission, she actually ran alongside ineligible runners in an event in order to support them.

— IAAF council's resolution, read by IAAF Secretary John Holt

Budd was suspended, at which point she returned to South Africa, and retired from international competition for several years.

In 1989, Budd married Mike Pieterse. The couple have three children. Also in 1989, Budd published her autobiography, Zola (co-written with Hugh Eley).

On her return to South Africa, Budd began racing again. She had an excellent season in 1991 and was the second-fastest woman in the world over 3000m. Following South Africa's re-admission to international sport, she competed in the 3000m at the 1992 Summer Olympics in Barcelona but did not qualify for the final. In 1993, she finished fourth at the World Cross Country championships but would never translate this form on to the track.

Budd remains the holder of numerous British and South African records at junior and senior levels, and still holds two junior world records: the mile and 3000m.

=== Relocation to U.S. ===
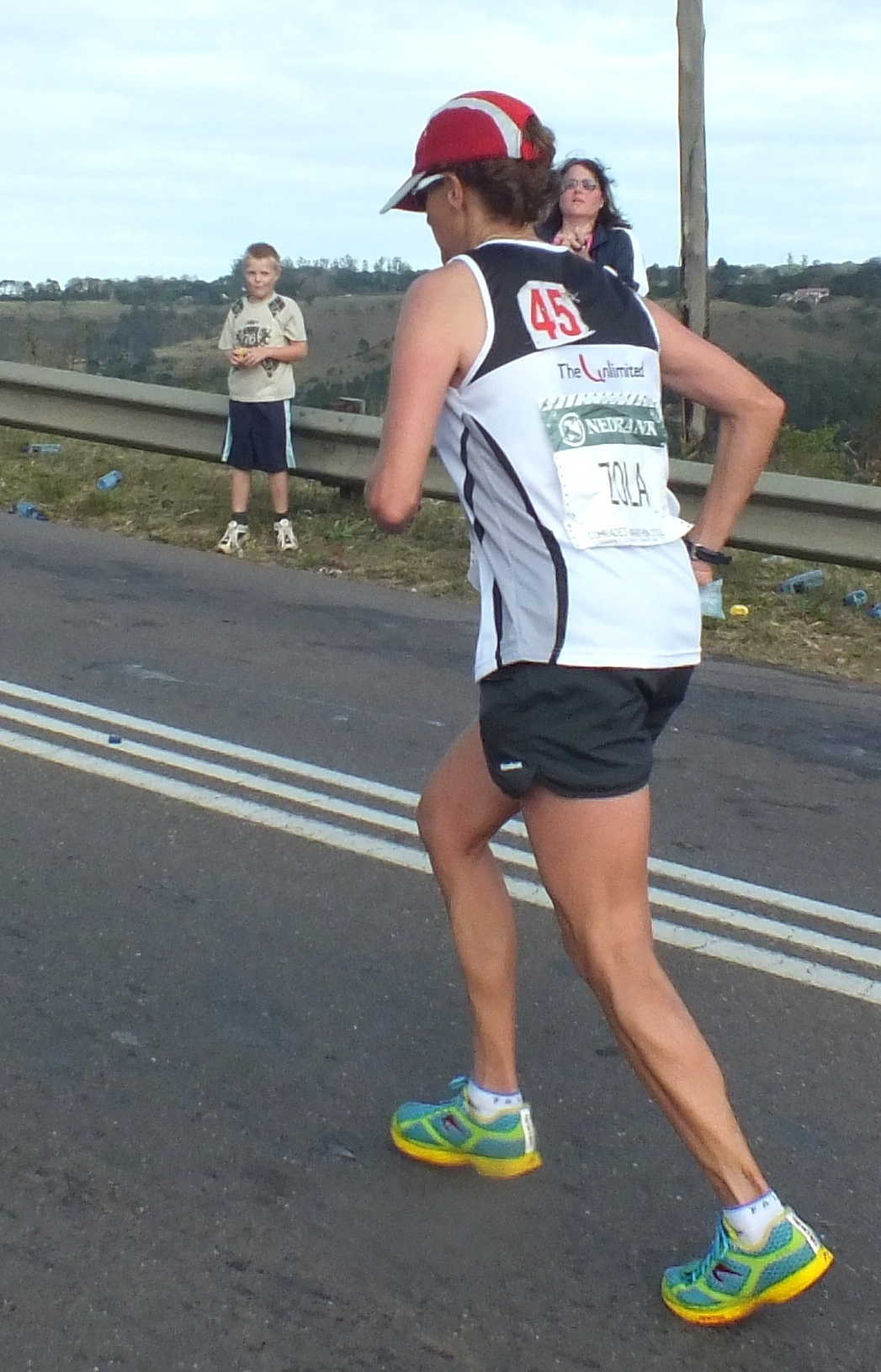
Pieterse at the 2012 Comrades Marathon. She finished in seventh place in the 2014 race, and was the first female veteran to cross the line.

Following allegations of her husband having an affair, Budd, under her married name Pieterse, and her three children relocated to Myrtle Beach, South Carolina, US, in August 2008; her husband joined them later. She initially had a two-year visa that allowed her to compete on the US masters' circuit. She raced in the South Carolina division of USA Track and Field, winning the women's division of the Dasani Half-Marathon during Bi-Lo Myrtle Beach Marathon on 14 February 2009 with a time of 1:20:41.

On 12 January 2012, she announced her participation in the 2012 edition of the nearly 90-kilometre (56-mile) Comrades Marathon which was held on 3 June 2012. She also participated in the Two Oceans Marathon during the Easter weekend of 2012 as she trained towards the Comrades Marathon which she ended up finishing in 8:06:09 (she was the 37th female finisher), earning a Bill Rowan Medal. Although she planned to also run the Comrades in 2013 she withdrew due to illness.

In June 2014, Budd entered the Comrades again, hoping for an overall silver medal and for a time under 7 hours 30 minutes (7:30:00). Budd beat her time target, finishing with a time of 6:55:55 and earning a gold medal for a top 10 finish as well as a gold medal as the 1st 'veteran' (senior) finisher while coming in as the 7th female finisher overall (the first six being at least 10 years her junior). Budd dedicated her 2014 Comrades run to South African teacher Pierre Korkie, held captive in Yemen by Al-Qaeda for one year. She was stripped of her 'veteran' gold medal (but not of her cash prize for finishing 7th overall) following accusations that she did not display a small age category tag on her running vest, in addition to the veteran designation already displayed on her running bib. Budd and her coach pointed out that the veteran gold medal and silver medal were then given to two runners who also did not have the small age category tag on their running vests, and announced in September 2014 that they had started court proceedings against the Comrades Marathon Association to have her veteran win reinstated.

In March 2015, Budd won the Run Hard Columbia (US) Marathon in a time of 3:05:27.

As of July 2020, she was an Assistant Cross Country and Girls Track Coach at Conway High School in Conway, South Carolina; and volunteered as assistant coach at Coastal Carolina University, also in Conway.

She moved back to South Africa in 2021.

== Cultural impact ==
In South Africa today, township taxis are nicknamed "Zola Budd" for their speed. The singer Brenda Fassie (whom Time magazine called "the Madonna of the townships" in 2001) had a hit single in the 1980s with her track "Zola Budd".

In July 2012, BBC Radio 4 broadcast a play about the political and media actions taken to bring Zola Budd to Britain with her father at the age of 17.

== Personal bests ==
	Event	Time	Date	Location
Outdoor	800 m	2:00.9.h	16 March 1984	Kroonstad, South Africa
Outdoor	1000 m	2:37.9h	7 February 1983	Bloemfontein, South Africa
Outdoor	1500 m	3:59.96	30 August 1985	Brussels, Belgium
Outdoor	Mile	4:17.57	21 August 1985	Zurich, Switzerland
Outdoor	2000 m	5:30.19	11 July 1986	London, United Kingdom
Outdoor	3000 m	8:28.83	7 September 1985	Rome, Italy
Outdoor	2 mile	9:29.6h	9 June 1985	London, United Kingdom
Outdoor	5000 m	14:48.07	26 August 1985	London, United Kingdom
Outdoor	10000 m	36:44.88	9 March 2012	Myrtle Beach, United States
Indoor	1500 m	4:06.87	25 January 1986	Cosford, United Kingdom
Indoor	3000 m	8:39.79	8 February 1986	Cosford, United Kingdom

== International competitions ==
Year	Competition	Venue	Position	Event	Notes
Representing Great Britain / England
1984	Olympic Games	Los Angeles, United States	7th	3000m	8:48.80
1985	World Cross Country Championships	Lisbon, Portugal	1st	5 km	15:01
1985	European Cup	Moscow, Soviet Union	1st	3000m	8:35.32
1986	World Cross Country Championships	Neuchâtel, Switzerland	1st	4.7 km	14:49
1986	European Championships	Stuttgart, Germany	9th	1500m	4:05.32
1986	European Championships	Stuttgart, Germany	4th	3000m	8:38.20
Representing South Africa
1992	Olympic Games	Barcelona, Spain	25th (heats)	3000m	9:07.10
1993	World Cross Country Championships	Amorebieta, Spain	4th	6.4 km	20:10
1994	World Cross Country Championships	Budapest, Hungary	7th	6.2 km	21:01
Marathons
2003	London Marathon	London, United Kingdom	DNF	—	—
2007	Kloppers Marathon	Bloemfontein, South Africa	1st	—	3:10:30
2008	New York City Marathon	New York, United States	69th	—	2:59.53
2011	Kiawah Island Marathon	Kiawah Island, United States	5th	—	3:01:51
2012	Myrtle Beach Marathon	Myrtle Beach, United States	3rd	—	3:00:14
2012	Jacksonville Marathon	Jacksonville, United States	4th	—	2:55:39
2014	Charleston Marathon	Charleston, United States	1st	—	2:59:42
2015	Run Hard Columbia Marathon	Columbia, United States	1st	—	3:05:27
2017	Stirling Scottish Marathon	Stirling, United Kingdom	9th	—	3:12:24

Sporting positions
Preceded by Mary Slaney; Ingrid Kristiansen	Women's 5000 m Best Year Performance; 1983; 1985	Succeeded by Ingrid Kristiansen; Ingrid Kristiansen
