= Annette Sergent =

French long-distance runner

Personal information
- Other names: Annette Sergent-Palluy; Annette Sergent-Petit
- Born: 17 November 1962 (age 63) Chambéry, France
- Height: 156 cm (5 ft 1 in)
- Weight: 46 kg (101 lb)

Sport
- Country: France
- Sport: Athletics
Medal record
Women's athletics
Representing France
World Cross Country Championships
Gold medal – first place	1987 Warsaw	Long race
Gold medal – first place	1989 Stavanger	Long race
Bronze medal – third place	1986 Colombier	Long race
Bronze medal – third place	1988 Auckland	Long race
European Championships
Bronze medal – third place	1990 Split	10,000 m
Mediterranean Games
Silver medal – second place	1993 Languedoc	3000 m

Annette Sergent (born 17 November 1962) is a French former long-distance runner. She represented her country three times at the Summer Olympics, but it was in cross country running that she had her greatest success. She became the first Frenchwoman to win a world title in the sport at the 1987 IAAF World Cross Country Championships and won for a second time in 1989. In addition to these victories, she made eleven appearances at the competition and placed third in both 1986 and 1988.

Her sole major track medal came over 10,000 metres at the 1990 European Athletics Championships, where she was the bronze medallist. She was also a 3000 m silver medallist at the 1993 Mediterranean Games. Over her career, she competed at the World Championships in Athletics on three occasions.

Sergent was a fifteen-time French champion, taking national honours eight times on the track and seven times in cross country. She set a number of national record marks in her career and remains the French record holder over 2000 m.

She was twice married and ran under the names Annette Sergent-Palluy and Sergent-Petit.

== Career ==
=== Early life ===
Born in Chambéry, France, she initially focused on the 3000 metres and won the French under-23 title at the age of nineteen and broke the French under-23 record in 1982. Sergent went on to win her first national title over that distance in 1983. She won a 1500/3000 m double at the French Athletics Championships the year after and was selected to represent France at the 1984 Summer Olympics in Los Angeles. On her first senior international outing, she was eliminated in the first round of the 3000 m, coming seventh in her heat. She closed the year with a win at the Cross du Figaro in Paris.

In 1985 she retained her two national track titles and began to prove herself in cross country running; Sergent won the first of her seven French cross country titles that year and finished seventeenth overall at the 1985 IAAF World Cross Country Championships. In October, she won on the roads at the 10K Foulées de Suresnes. At the 1986 edition of the competition she won her first international medals in the long race, taking bronze medals in the individual and team events. Her continental track debut for France came at the 1986 European Athletics Championships in Stuttgart and although she was eliminated in the heats of the 1500 m, she managed eighth in the women's 3000 m final.

=== World champion ===
Sergent claimed her first world title at the 1987 IAAF World Cross Country Championships, beating Liz Lynch by two seconds. She also led the French women to second in the team rankings behind the United States (led by Lynn Jennings). Her debut at the 1987 World Championships in Athletics followed and she narrowly missed the final, finishing eighth in her heat. She began the 1988 season with wins at the Cinque Mulini cross country meeting and the French Championship race. At the World Cross Championships in Auckland she failed to retain her title but won a medal for the third year running, taking individual and team bronze medals in the long race. On the track she set national records in the 3000 m and the 10,000 metres. She was a finalist in both events at the 1988 Seoul Olympics, finishing 12th and 19th respectively. That year she ranked second over 5000 m at the IAAF Grand Prix Final, finishing as runner-up to Britain's Liz McColgan.

A fifth consecutive French cross country title came in 1989 and at the 1989 IAAF World Cross Country Championships she returned to the top of the podium, taking the gold medal and taking France to the team runner-up spot close behind the Soviet team. She suffered an injury, missing the rest of the season, and returned to action at the 1990 IAAF World Cross Country Championships held in Aix-les-Bains. She was not at full strength, however, and finished in 17th place overall. She competed over 10,000 m at the 1990 European Athletics Championships in Split and came away with the bronze medal (her first on the track) and a new French record mark of 31:51.68 minutes. After the track season, she took to the roads and won the 3 km race at the Giro Podistico Internazionale di Pettinengo in Italy.

Her principal race of 1991 came over 10,000 m at the 1991 World Championships in Athletics. Although she qualified easily with a run 31:55.97 minutes, she could not match this form in the final, in which she finished 19th and was over a minute slower. Sergent's career began to decline and in 1992 she came 27th at the 1992 World Cross Country race and failed to make it out of the 10,000 m heats at the 1992 Barcelona Olympics. She was part of the bronze medal-winning women's team at the 1993 IAAF World Cross Country Championships, but it was Farida Fatès who led the team while Sergent finished in 34th place. At the 1993 World Championships in Athletics she was eliminated in the heats of the 3000 m in her third and final appearance at the competition. She did not end the season empty handed, however, as at the 1993 Mediterranean Games, held on home turf in Languedoc-Roussillon, she took the silver medal over 3000 m.

=== Late career ===
An 89th-place finish at the 1994 World Cross Country was a career low, but she improved the year after to come 19th in the 1995 World long race. She also won her seventh (and last) French Cross Country Championship With women now competing over 5000 m at the outdoor world championships, she had to enter at the 1995 IAAF World Indoor Championships to compete in her specialist 3000 m event and she managed eighth in the final. Sergent ran at the 2nd European Cross Country Championships in December and came sixth, helping the French women's team to third in the team rankings.

She made her eleventh World Cross Country Championships appearance at the 1996 edition and finished 24th in the women's long race, ranking sixth with the French team. That year was the last of her athletics career and she brought it to an end with a win at the inaugural Lille Half Marathon race, taking the title in a time of 1:11:21 hours.

Following her retirement from competitive athletics in 1996, she is now a member of the European Athletic Association's cross country committee.

== National records ==
Over her career, she broke a number of French record ranging from the mile run to the 10,000 metres. Her first national record mark came in 1985, when she ran a time of 8:52.32 minutes for the 3000 metres. She improved this to 8:50.56 the following month and broke Patricia Deneuville's French mile record a month after that (registering a time of 4:39.35 mins). In July 1986 she lopped three and a half seconds off her 3000 m mark, set a time of 5:39.00 mins for the 2000 m, then bettered Joëlle De Brouwer's 5000 metres record by almost twenty seconds, setting a new standard of 15:32.92 mins. Two further improvements over 3000 m and 5000 m came in 1988, with runs of 8:44.19 and 15:18.24 mins respectively. She also beat Christine Loiseau's record over 10,000 m that year. In 1990 she ran 15:16.44 mins for the 5000 m, which was to be her last national mark over that distance. Her run of 31:51.68 minutes at that year's European Championships made her the first Frenchwoman to complete the event in under 32 minutes. Although her 2000 m time is still the best set by a French athlete, all her records in other events were not long-standing: her 3000 m was beaten by Marie-Pierre Duros after a year, her 10,000 m mark was beaten by Rosario Murcia after two years, while her 5000 m was broken after four years by Farida Fatès.
