= Mary Decker =

American middle-distance runner

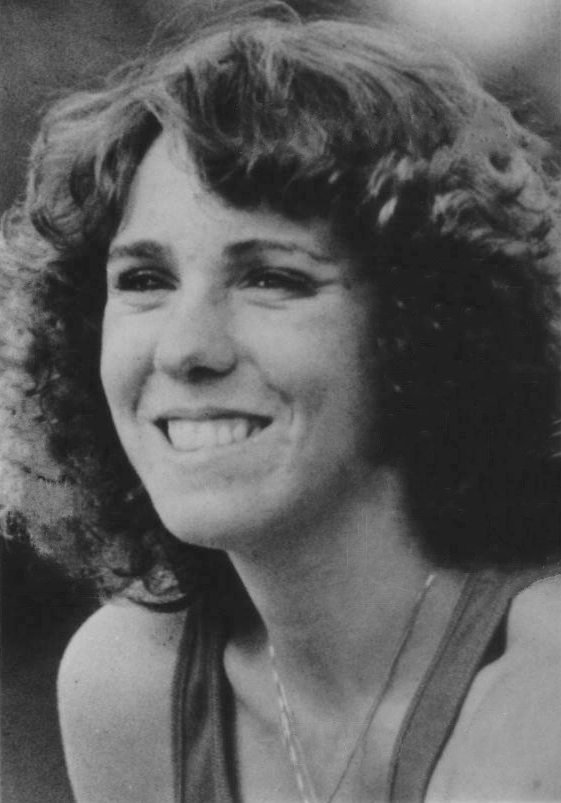
- Decker in 1982

Personal information
- Born: Mary Teresa Decker; August 4, 1958 (age 68) Bunnvale, New Jersey, U.S.
- Height: 168 cm (5 ft 6 in)
- Weight: 51 kg (112 lb)

Sport
- Sport: Middle distance running
- Event: 800–5000 m
- Club: Athletics West, Eugene
- Retired: 1999

Achievements and titles
- Personal bests: 800 m: 1:56.90 (1985); 1500 m: 3:57.12 (1983); Mile: 4:16.71 (1985); 3000 m: 8:25.83 (1985); 5000 m: 15:06.53 (1985); 10,000 m: 31:35.3 (1982)
Medal record
Representing United States
World Championships
Gold medal – first place	1983 Helsinki	1500 m
Gold medal – first place	1983 Helsinki	3000 m
Pan American Games
Gold medal – first place	1979 San Juan	1500 m

Mary Teresa Decker, (born August 4, 1958) is an American retired middle-distance and long-distance runner. During her career, she won gold medals in the 1500 meters and 3000 meters at the 1983 World Championships and was the world-record holder in the mile, 5000 meters and 10,000 meters. In total, she set 17 official and unofficial world records, and she was the first woman to break 4:20 for the mile. She also set 36 U.S. national records at distances ranging from 800 meters to 10,000 meters, and has held the U.S. record in the 2000 meters and 3000 meters since the early 1980s, while her 1500 meters record stood for 32 years and her mile record stood for 38 years. In 2003, she was inducted into the National Track and Field Hall of Fame. She was retroactively banned for two years from June 1996 for a doping violation for a high testosterone to epitestosterone ratio.

== Career ==
In 1973, she set her first world record, running an indoor mile in 4:40.1. By 1974, Decker was the world indoor record holder with 2:02.4 for 880 yards, and 2:01.8 for 800 meters.

By the end of 1974, Decker had developed a case of the muscle condition compartment syndrome. This resulted in a series of injuries that prevented her from competing in the 1976 Summer Olympics because of stress fractures in her lower leg. After recovering from surgery, she spent two seasons at the University of Colorado at Boulder on a track scholarship. In 1979, she became the second American woman (the first was Francie Larrieu) to break the 4:30 mile. Decker was the first woman to break the 4:20 barrier for the mile in 1980 when she ran it in 4:17.55. Decker did not compete at the 1980 Moscow Summer Olympics because of the American boycott. However, she received one of 461 Congressional Gold Medals created especially for the American athletes.

In 1981, Decker married fellow American distance runner Ron Tabb. The couple divorced in 1983. In 1982, under the name Mary Tabb, she ran the mile in 4:18.08, breaking the official record of 4:20.89 by the Lyudmila Veselkova of the USSR, and this time was ratified.

=== Career peak ===
In 1982 Decker-Tabb set six world records at distances ranging from the mile run to 10,000 meters. She received the James E. Sullivan Award as the top amateur athlete in the United States.

The following year she achieved the "Double Decker," winning both the 1500 meters and 3000 meters events at the World Championships in Helsinki, Finland. Her history of relatively easy wins in the United States left her tactical abilities suspect in Helsinki, as she chose not to run in close order because so few athletes could keep up with her, a situation that the Soviet runners hoped to use to their advantage. Her wins against Soviet World Record holders proved a redemption of her competitive guile. After her double win she won the Jesse Owens Award from USA Track and Field and Sports Illustrated magazine named her Sportsperson of the Year. Shortly before her World Championship victories, Decker improved her U.S. 1500 meters record to 3:57.12 in Stockholm on July 26, 1983. This record stood for 32 years until Shannon Rowbury ran 3:56.29 on July 17, 2015.

== The 1984 Olympic incident ==
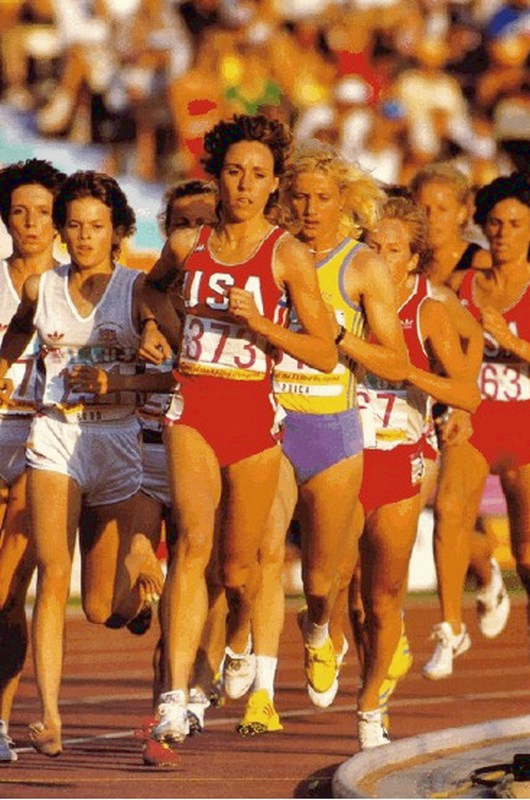
Decker leading the 3000 m final at the 1984 Olympics, with Zola Budd and Wendy Sly to her right, and Maricica Puică just behind to her left

Decker was heavily favored to win a gold medal in the 3000 meters run at the 1984 Summer Olympics in Los Angeles. In the final, barefoot runner Zola Budd, representing Great Britain, had been running even with Decker for three laps and then moved ahead. In an attempt to place pressure on Budd, Decker remained close by in a crowded space. However, Decker collided with Budd and fell to the curb, injuring her hip, and she did not finish the race, which was won by Maricica Puică of Romania (Budd finished seventh). Decker was carried from the track in tears by her boyfriend (and later husband), British discus thrower Richard Slaney. At a press conference, she pinned the blame for the collision on Budd. While it is generally the trailing runner's responsibility to avoid contact with the runner ahead, it is also an accepted convention among most distance runners that the leader should be at least one full stride ahead before the trailing runner moves directly behind her. International track officials initially disqualified Budd for obstruction, but she was reinstated just one hour later after officials viewed films of the race. Despite the fact that she had been running behind Budd, Decker's claim that Budd had bumped into her leg was supported by a number of sports journalists. The claim was not accepted by the director of the games or by the IAAF.

Decker and Budd next met in July 1985 for a 3000-meter race at Crystal Palace National Sports Centre in London. Decker won the race, and Budd finished in fourth place. After the race, the women shook hands and reconciled. Decker later claimed that she was robbed of the 1984 Olympics 3000-meter gold medal by Budd, but many years after the event said: "The reason I fell, some people think she tripped me deliberately. I happen to know that wasn't the case at all. The reason I fell is because I am and was very inexperienced in running in a pack." Budd and Decker later reunited for a 2016 documentary about the incident, The Fall.

Decker had a successful 1985 season, winning 12 mile and 3000-meter races in Europe, including a new official world record for the women's mile of 4:16.71 in Zurich (Natalya Artyomova's 4:15.8 in 1984 was not ratified by the IAAF), a race in which she beat both Budd and Puică. Since that race in 1985, Decker's time has only been bettered four times.

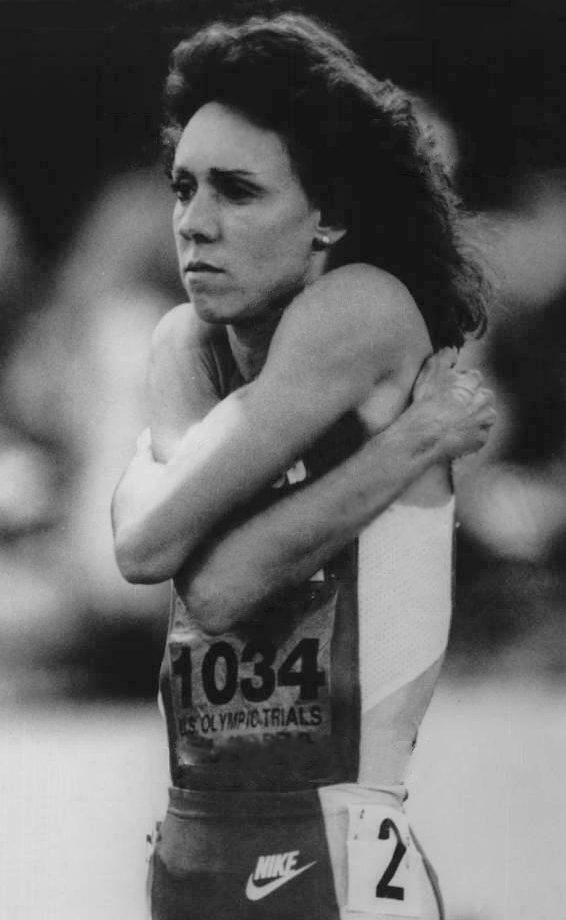
Decker at the 1988 Olympic trials

Decker missed the 1986 season to give birth to her only child, and then missed the 1987 season because of injury. She qualified for the 1988 Summer Olympics in Seoul, South Korea, competing at 1500 meters and 3000 meters, but finished in 8th and 10th respectively, failing to win a medal. She did not qualify for the 1992 Summer Olympics.

== Doping controversy ==
In 1996, at the age of 37, as she qualified for the 5000 meters at the Atlanta Olympics, a urine test taken in June at the Olympic trials showed a testosterone to epitestosterone (T/E) ratio greater than the allowable maximum of 6:1. At the time of the positive test, Decker was being coached by Alberto Salazar.

Decker and her lawyers contended that the T/E ratio test is unreliable for women, especially women in their late 30s or older who take birth-control pills. In the meantime, Decker was eliminated in the heats at the Olympics.

In June 1997, the IAAF banned Decker from competition. In September 1999, a USATF panel reinstated her. The IAAF cleared her to compete but took the case to arbitration. In April 1999, the arbitration panel ruled against Decker, and although she was cleared to compete, the IAAF instituted a retroactive ban of two years from June 17, 1996, that stripped her of the silver medal that she had won in the 1500-meter race at the 1997 World Indoor Championships.

In April 1999, Decker filed suit against both the IAAF and the U.S. Olympic Committee that had administered the test, arguing that the test is flawed and cannot distinguish between androgens caused by the use of banned substances and those resulting from the use of birth-control pills. The court ruled that it had no jurisdiction, and the decision was upheld on appeal.

The T/E test threshold has since been tightened to a 4:1 ratio, and laboratories now also run a carbon isotope ratio test (CIR) if the T/E ratio is unusually high.

== Later life ==
Throughout her later career, Decker had suffered a series of stress-induced fractures. After the loss of her 1999 legal case, she underwent more than 30 orthopedic procedures, mainly on her legs and feet, in an attempt to enable her to run competitively in marathons. However, after the surgeries, she continued to experience injuries. As a result, she retired with her husband to a 55-acre (22 ha) property in Eugene, Oregon, where she jogged every other day.

== International competitions ==
Year	Competition	Venue	Position	Event	Result
Representing United States
1979	Pan American Games	San Juan, Puerto Rico	1st	1500 m	4:05.7
1983	World Championships	Helsinki, Finland	1st	1500 m	4:00.90
1983	World Championships	Helsinki, Finland	1st	3000 m	8:34.62
1984	Olympic Games	Los Angeles, United States	DNF	3000 m	8:44.32 (heat)
1985	Grand Prix Final	Rome, Italy	1st	3000 m	8:46.38
1988	Olympic Games	Seoul, South Korea	8th	1500 m	4:02.49
1988	Olympic Games	Seoul, South Korea	10th	3000 m	8:47.13
1991	Grand Prix Final	Barcelona, Spain	2nd	Mile	4:28.35
1996	Olympic Games	Atlanta, United States	21st (h)	5000 m	15:41.30
1997	World Indoor Championships	Paris, France	DQ (2nd)	1500 m	~~4:05.22~~
(h) Indicates overall position in qualifying heats. DNF = did not finish. DQ = disqualified.

== See also ==
- List of sportspeople sanctioned for doping offences

Records
Preceded by Natalia Mărășescu	Women's mile world record holder 26 January 1980 – 12 September 1981; 9 July 1982 – 9 September 1982; 21 August 1985 – 10 July 1989	Succeeded by Lyudmila Veselkova
Preceded by Lyudmila Veselkova	Women's mile world record holder 26 January 1980 – 12 September 1981; 9 July 1982 – 9 September 1982; 21 August 1985 – 10 July 1989	Succeeded by Maricica Puică
Preceded by Maricica Puică	Women's mile world record holder 26 January 1980 – 12 September 1981; 9 July 1982 – 9 September 1982; 21 August 1985 – 10 July 1989	Succeeded by Paula Ivan
Awards and achievements
Preceded by Martina Navratilova	United Press International; Athlete of the Year; 1985	Succeeded by Heike Drechsler
Sporting positions
Preceded by Paula Fudge	Women's 5.000m Best Year Performance; 1982	Succeeded by Zola Budd
Preceded by Tatyana Kazankina	Women's 3.000m Best Year Performance; 1985	Succeeded by Olga Bondarenko
