= 1985 IAAF World Cross Country Championships =

- Organisers: IAAF
- Edition: 13th
- Date: March 24
- Host city: Lisbon, Portugal
- Venue: Sports Complex of Jamor
- Events: 3
- Distances: 12.19 km – Senior men 8.19 km – Junior men 4.99 km – Senior women
- Participation: 570 athletes from 50 nations

The 1985 IAAF World Cross Country Championships was held in Lisbon, Portugal, at the Sports Complex of Jamor on March 24, 1985. A report on the event was given in the Glasgow Herald.

Complete results for men, junior men, women, medallists, and the results of British athletes were published.

== Medallists ==
Event	Gold		Silver		Bronze	
Individual
Senior men (12.19 km)	Carlos Lopes; Portugal	33:33	Paul Kipkoech; Kenya	33:37	Wodajo Bulti; Ethiopia	33:38
Junior men (8.19 km)	Kipkemboi Kimeli; Kenya	22:18	Habte Negash; Ethiopia	22:37	Wolde Silasse Melkessa; Ethiopia	22:37
Senior women (4.99 km)	Zola Budd; England	15:01	Cathy Branta; United States	15:24	Ingrid Kristiansen; Norway	15:27
Team
Senior men	Ethiopia	129	Kenya	141	United States	153
Junior men	Ethiopia	16	Kenya	26	Spain	64
Senior women	United States	42	Soviet Union	77	Romania	96

== Race results ==
=== Senior men's race (12.19 km) ===
Individual race
Rank	Athlete	Country	Time
1st place, gold medalist(s)	Carlos Lopes	Portugal	33:33
2nd place, silver medalist(s)	Paul Kipkoech	Kenya	33:37
3rd place, bronze medalist(s)	Wodajo Bulti	Ethiopia	33:38
4	Bekele Debele	Ethiopia	33:45
5	John Treacy	Ireland	33:48
6	Kassa Balcha	Ethiopia	33:51
7	Christoph Herle	West Germany	33:53
8	Abdelrazzak Bounour	Algeria	33:54
9	Pierre Levisse	France	33:56
10	Bruce Bickford	United States	33:57
11	Fernando Mamede	Portugal	33:59
12	Pat Porter	United States	34:02
Full results

Teams
Rank	Team	Points
1st place, gold medalist(s)	Ethiopia: Wodajo Bulti / 3; Bekele Debele / 4; Kassa Balcha / 6; Girma Berhanu / 28; Chala Urgessa / 33; Hailu Wolde Tsadik / 55; (Adugna Lema) / (106); (Feyissa Abebe) / (219); (Mohammed Kedir) / (DNF)	129
2nd place, silver medalist(s)	Kenya: Paul Kipkoech / 2; Andrew Masai / 14; Boniface Merande / 17; Joshua Kipkemboi / 22; Jackson Ruto / 41; James Kipngetich / 45; (Joseph Otieno) / (128); (Bernhard Mosigisi) / (132); (Sisa Kirati) / (194)	141
3rd place, bronze medalist(s)	United States: Bruce Bickford / 10; Pat Porter / 12; Ed Eyestone / 16; Craig Virgin / 19; Mark Curp / 40; Jeff Drenth / 56; (Mark Stickley) / (58); (David Barney) / (76); (Marty Froelick) / (110)	153
4	Italy	259
5	Spain	321
6	Ireland	363
7	Portugal	368
8	England	437
Full results

- Note: Athletes in parentheses did not score for the team result

=== Junior men's race (8.19 km) ===
Individual race
Rank	Athlete	Country	Time
1st place, gold medalist(s)	Kipkemboi Kimeli	Kenya	22:18
2nd place, silver medalist(s)	Habte Negash	Ethiopia	22:37
3rd place, bronze medalist(s)	Wolde Silasse Melkessa	Ethiopia	22:37
4	Rafera Workench	Ethiopia	22:45
5	Ngotho Musyoki	Kenya	22:48
6	Lawrence Gatogo	Kenya	23:04
7	Tilahun Ebba	Ethiopia	23:07
8	Debebe Demisse	Ethiopia	23:11
9	José Manuel García	Spain	23:15
10	Brahim Boutayeb	Morocco	23:19
11	Paolo Tagliapietra	Italy	23:22
12	Jeff Cannada	United States	23:23
Full results

Teams
Rank	Team	Points
1st place, gold medalist(s)	Ethiopia: Habte Negash / 2; Wolde Silasse Melkessa / 3; Rafera Workench / 4; Tilahun Ebba / 7; (Debebe Demisse) / (8); (Kalcha Abcha) / (18)	16
2nd place, silver medalist(s)	Kenya: Kipkemboi Kimeli / 1; Ngotho Musyoki / 5; Lawrence Gatogo / 6; Samuel Okemwa / 14	26
3rd place, bronze medalist(s)	Spain: José Manuel García / 9; Alejandro Gómez / 16; Antonio Pérez / 17; Antonio Peula / 22; (Marc Pujol) / (27); (José Gruneiro) / (35)	64
4	United States	95
5	England	122
6	Italy	127
7	Hungary	197
8	Tunisia	216
Full results

- Note: Athletes in parentheses did not score for the team result

=== Senior women's race (4.99 km) ===
Individual race
Rank	Athlete	Country	Time
1st place, gold medalist(s)	Zola Budd	England	15:01
2nd place, silver medalist(s)	Cathy Branta	United States	15:24
3rd place, bronze medalist(s)	Ingrid Kristiansen	Norway	15:27
4	Fiţa Lovin	Romania	15:35
5	Cornelia Bürki	Switzerland	15:38
6	Angela Tooby	Wales	15:40
7	Olga Bondarenko	Soviet Union	15:40
8	Sue Bruce	New Zealand	15:42
9	Betty Springs	United States	15:44
10	Elena Fidatof	Romania	15:47
11	Debbie Scott	Canada	15:49
12	Monica Joyce	Ireland	15:49
Full results

Teams
Rank	Team	Points
1st place, gold medalist(s)	United States: Cathy Branta / 2; Betty Springs / 9; Shelly Steely / 15; Kathryn Hayes / 16; (Mary Knisely) / (28); (Nan Doak) / (46)	42
2nd place, silver medalist(s)	Soviet Union: Olga Bondarenko / 7; Tatyana Pozdnyakova / 19; Marina Rodchenkova / 20; Irina Bondarchuk / 31; (Tatyana Sokolova) / (41)	77
3rd place, bronze medalist(s)	Romania: Fiţa Lovin / 4; Elena Fidatof / 10; Paula Ilie / 34; Mariana Stanescu / 48; (Iulia Besliu) / (87)	96
4	France	109
5	Canada	113
6	Portugal	134
7	New Zealand	144
8	England	153
Full results

- Note: Athletes in parentheses did not score for the team result

== Medal table (unofficial) ==
* Host nation (Portugal)

Rank	Nation	Gold	Silver	Bronze	Total
1	Ethiopia (ETH)	2	1	2	5
2	Kenya (KEN)	1	3	0	4
3	United States (USA)	1	1	1	3
4	England (ENG)	1	0	0	1
4	Portugal (POR)*	1	0	0	1
6	Soviet Union (URS)	0	1	0	1
7	Norway (NOR)	0	0	1	1
7	Romania (ROU)	0	0	1	1
7	Spain (ESP)	0	0	1	1
Totals (9 entries)		6	6	6	18

- Note: Totals include both individual and team medals, with medals in the team competition counting as one medal.

== Participation ==
An unofficial count yields the participation of 569 athletes from 50 countries, four athletes (2 senior men, 2 junior men) less than the official number published.

- Algeria (15)
- Angola (6)
- Australia (21)
- Belgium (15)
- Brazil (9)
- Canada (21)
- China (7)
- Chinese Taipei (7)
- Colombia (5)
- Denmark (18)
- Egypt (2)
- England (21)
- Ethiopia (15)
- Finland (9)
- France (21)
- Gibraltar (17)
- Greece (7)
- Hong Kong (10)
- Hungary (7)
- Iceland (3)
- Ireland (20)
- Israel (2)
- Italy (18)
- Japan (7)
- Jordan (2)
- Kenya (14)
- Kuwait (6)
- Morocco (12)
- Netherlands (12)
- New Zealand (13)
- Northern Ireland (18)
- North Yemen (3)
- Norway (9)
- Palestine (4)
- Poland (6)
- Portugal (21)
- Romania (5)
- São Tomé and Príncipe (1)
- Saudi Arabia (14)
- Scotland (21)
- Soviet Union (7)
- Spain (21)
- Sweden (13)
- Switzerland (12)
- Tunisia (12)
- Turkey (1)
- United States (21)
- Wales (20)
- West Germany (16)
- Zimbabwe (3)

== See also ==
- 1985 IAAF World Cross Country Championships – Senior men's race
- 1985 IAAF World Cross Country Championships – Junior men's race
- 1985 IAAF World Cross Country Championships – Senior women's race
- 1985 in athletics (track and field)
