= Cornelia Bürki =

Swiss distance runner

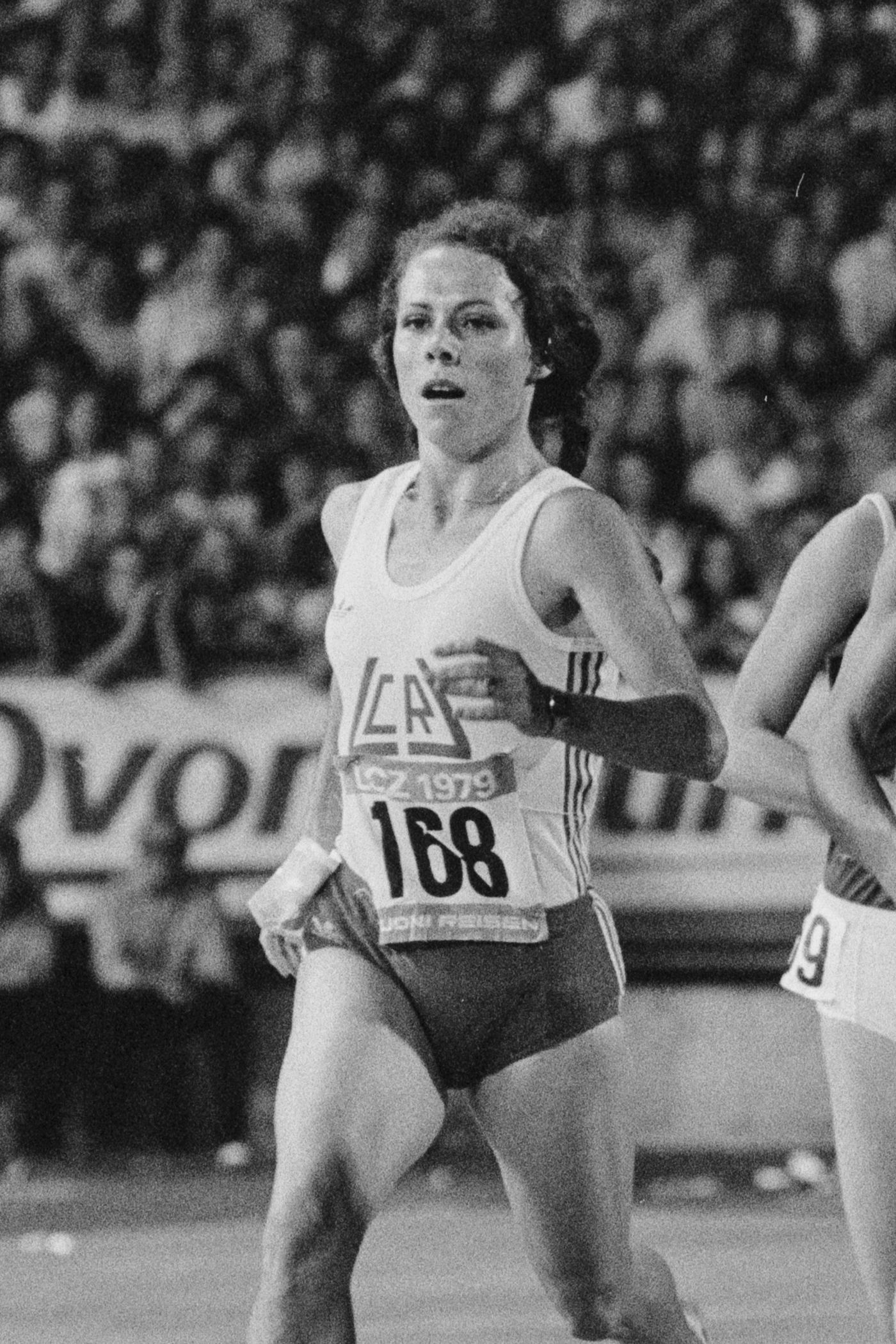
- Cornelia Bürki at the Leichtathletik Meeting, Letzigrund, Zürich in August 1979

Personal information
- National team: Switzerland
- Born: 3 October 1953 (age 72) Humansdorp, South Africa
- Occupation: Long-distance runner

Cornelia Bürki (born 3 October 1953) is a South African-born retired long-distance runner who represented Switzerland in three consecutive Olympic Games, starting in 1980, with her best result being fifth in the 1984 3000 metres final. She is a 47-time Swiss national outdoor champion, which includes a fifteen-year undefeated streak in cross country and fifteen consecutive titles over 1500 metres, from 1975 to 1989. She was voted the Swiss Sports Personality of the Year in 1978. That year, she finished fifth at the 1978 IAAF World Cross Country Championships. She was fourth in the 1500m and 3000m finals at the 1987 World Championships.

== Athletic career ==
Born in Humansdorp, South Africa, Bürki moved to Switzerland in 1973. She started with athletics in April 1974. After only 3 months of training, she already represented Switzerland at a match against Italy and France. One year later she broke the Swiss records in the 1500m and 3000m. In 1996, she added the 800m record to her name. In 1978, she came 5th at the Cross Country world championships in Glasgow. At the European Championships in Prague, she came 6th in the 3000m and 8th in the 1500m. In both races, she set new Swiss records.

At her Olympic debut in the 1980 Summer Olympics, she finished seventh in her semi-final over 1500 metres. That year, she also won the women's 7 km race at the inaugural Greifenseelauf. Her career had a knock when her 9-year-old daughter Esther was knocked down by a car and was in a coma for 6 months. After that she took care of her severely disabled daughter, and did not have much time for training. She ran at the 1983 World Championships in Athletics, finishing tenth and eleventh in the 1500 m and 3000 metres, respectively. She was fifth in the women's 3000 m at the 1984 Summer Olympics and also took fifth in the long race at the 1985 IAAF World Cross Country Championships. She was selected to represent Switzerland at the 1986 European Athletics Championships, and finished seventh in the 3000 m final and 8th in the 1500m. That season she was ranked third over 1500 m in the IAAF Grand Prix Final.

She was seventh in the long race at the 1987 IAAF World Cross Country Championships, and just missed out on a global medal on the track later that year, taking fourth place in the 1500 and 3000 meters m at the 1987 World Championships in Athletics. She managed in the 1500 meters to break the 4 minutes barrier. After bad luck with a severe upper leg injury, she still managed to qualify for her final Olympics in 1988 in Seoul, where she competed in both the 1500 m and 3000 m races. She was eliminated in the preliminary rounds in the former event, but went on to finish in eleventh in the 3000 m final. She was also the national flag-bearer for Switzerland at the event. Bürki's career was marked by injuries and close defeats. At a World Championships event in Rome, she missed medaling in the 3000 meters by just 1/100 second. At the cross Swiss country championships in 1988 she slipped and pulled the Sartorius muscle so badly that she was unable to train for weeks. She still managed to qualify for the Olympics in Seoul, although the injury caused problems for the next two years, until she officially retired from running. She is since 1990 a coach in Rapperswil and still take care of her disabled daughter. Her other daughter Sorita Rickenbach has got 2 children, Maurice Rickenbach and Jayden Rickenbach. She is the co-owner of www.atstaplus.com a B&B Guest House in Summerstrand, Port Elizabeth, South Africa.

== Personal life ==
Cornelia is married to Beat and has got 2 daughters Sorita and Esther. Since 1981, she has been the primary care-giver of her daughter Esther, who was in a coma for six months after a car accident and uses a wheelchair. She is Grandmother of Maurice Jay and Jayden Connor Rickenbach. Cornelia is the co-owner of a bed and breakfast in Port Elizabeth, South Africa. She was coaching Sabine Fischer (9th at the 2000 Sydney Olympic Games) for many years. She was also coaching middle distance runners Hugo Santacruz, Swiss Champion 800m and Mario Bächtiger, Swiss Champion 1500m in her hometown Rapperswil.

== International competitions ==
| Year | Competition | Venue | Position | Event | Notes |
Representing Switzerland
| 1976 | European Indoor Championships | Munich, Germany | 6th | 1500 m | 4:22.00 |
| 1977 | European Indoor Championships | San Sebastián, Spain | 4th | 1500 m | 4:16.8 |
| 1977 | World Cross Country Championships | Düsseldorf, Germany | 10th | 5.1 km | 18:02 |
| 1978 | World Cross Country Championships | Glasgow, United Kingdom | 5th | 4.7 km | 17:13 |
| 1978 | European Championships | Prague, Czechoslovakia | 8th | 1500 m | 4:04.4 |
| 1978 | European Championships | Prague, Czechoslovakia | 6th | 3000 m | 8:46.1 |
| 1980 | Olympic Games | Moscow, Soviet Union | 13th (h) | 1500 m | 4:05.5 |
| 1981 | World Cross Country Championships | Madrid, Spain | 19th | 4.4 km | 14:50 |
| 1982 | European Championships | Athens, GHrece | 11th | 3000 m | 8:55.67 |
| 1983 | World Championships | Helsinki, Switzerland | 10th | 1500 m | 4:11.61 |
| 1983 | World Championships | Helsinki, Switzerland | 11th | 3000 m | 8:53.85 |
| 1984 | Olympic Games | Los Angeles, United States | 5th | 3000 m | 8:45.20 |
| 1985 | World Cross Country Championships | Lisbon, Portugal | 5th | 4.99 km | 15:38 |
| 1986 | World Cross Country Championships | Neuchâtel, Switzerland | 14th | 4.65 km | 15:32 |
| 1986 | European Championships | Stuttgart, Germany | 8th | 1500 m | 4:05.31 |
| 1986 | European Championships | Stuttgart, Germany | 7th | 3000 m | 8:44.44 |
| 1987 | World Cross Country Championships | Warsaw, Poland | 7th | 5.05 km | 17:08 |
| 1987 | World Championships | Rome, Italy | 4th | 1500 m | 3:59.90 |
| 1987 | World Championships | Rome, Italy | 4th | 3000 m | 8:40.31 |
| 1988 | Olympic Games | Seoul, South Korea | 20th (h) | 1500 m | 4:10.89 |
| 1988 | Olympic Games | Seoul, South Korea | 11th | 3000 m | 8:48.32 |
(h) Indicates overall position in qualifying heats

Olympic Games
| Preceded by Christine Stückelberger | Flagbearer for Switzerland; Seoul 1988 | Succeeded by Daniel Giubellini |

Awards
| Preceded by (Switzerland) Lise-Marie Morerod | Swiss Sportswoman of the Year; 1978 | Succeeded by (Switzerland) Denise Biellmann |
