= 1993 World Championships in Athletics – Women's 1500 metres =

These are the official results of the Women's 1.500 metres event at the 1993 IAAF World Championships in Stuttgart, Germany. There were a total number of 40 participating athletes, with three qualifying heats and the final held on Sunday 1993-08-22. The winning margin was 2.98 seconds which as of 2024 is the greatest winning margin for the women's 1500 metres at these championships.

The three Chinese athletes in this race showed their inexperience at this level. Yan Wei looked at the starter while all the other athletes were looking forward at their first step. At the gun, all three were squeezed to the back having to halt their steps, with Liu Dong being left at the back of the field. Liu sped around the outside of the field in the first 125 metres to reach the front, but Olympic champion Hassiba Boulmerka had no interest in letting her take the pace, instead aggressively holding Liu to the outside. Boxed at the back of the pack for the first 400 meters, Lü Yi then ran around the far outside of the pack to join Liu's shoulder on the outside. Just before 800 meters, Yan worked her way through traffic to get behind Lü, temporarily boxing in Sonia O'Sullivan. Crossing the start line for the second time, Liu accelerated into the lead with Lü in tow. Boulmerka continued to fight, holding off Lü with the field stringing out behind them. Over the next lap, it became a four-woman breakaway as O'Sullivan was the only other able to hold onto the pace. Liu continued to increase the gap to Boulmerka, opening up 10 metres down the backstretch as Lü sprinted past Boulmerka into second. O'Sullivan followed Lü then sprinted past her on the final curve. Liu was gone, pulling away to a 15-metre win. O'Sullivan maintained her position as Lü faded. Boulmerka was unable to make any headway against O'Sullivan and had to settle for bronze.

== Final ==
RANK	FINAL	TIME
	Liu Dong (CHN)	4:00.50
	Sonia O'Sullivan (IRL)	4:03.48
	Hassiba Boulmerka (ALG)	4:04.29
4.	Lü Yi (CHN)	4:06.06
5.	Angela Chalmers (CAN)	4:07.95
6.	Theresia Kiesl (AUT)	4:08.04
7.	Anna Brzezińska (POL)	4:08.11
8.	Fabia Trabaldo (ITA)	4:08.23
9.	Violeta Szekely (ROM)	4:08.57
10.	Yan Wei (CHN)	4:09.05
11.	Carla Sacramento (POR)	4:09.15
12.	Maite Zúñiga (ESP)	4:10.79
13.	Lyudmila Rogachova (RUS)	4:12.14
14.	Leah Pells (CAN)	4:13.87
15.	Oksana Mernikova (BLR)	4:18.93

== Qualifying heats ==
- Held on Friday 1993-08-20

RANK	HEAT 1	TIME
1.	Sonia O'Sullivan (IRL)	4:05.81
2.	Lü Yi (CHN)	4:05.97
3.	Theresia Kiesl (AUT)	4:06.89
4.	Maite Zúñiga (ESP)	4:07.46
5.	Anna Brzezińska (POL)	4:08.33
6.	Bettina Andersen (DEN)	4:09.75
7.	Blandine Bitzner-Ducret (FRA)	4:10.70
8.	Alisa Hill (USA)	4:11.29
9.	Sonia McGeorge (GBR)	4:12.93
10.	Sarah Howell (CAN)	4:13.40
11.	Ravilya Agletdinova (BLR)	4:17.43
12.	Laurence Niyonsaba (RWA)	4:25.70
13.	Raj Kumari Pandey (NEP)	4:49.22
–	Lyubov Kremlyova (RUS)	DNS

RANK	HEAT 2	TIME
1.	Hassiba Boulmerka (ALG)	4:13.13
2.	Yan Wei (CHN)	4:13.87
3.	Oksana Mernikova (BLR)	4:13.93
4.	Angela Chalmers (CAN)	4:13.94
5.	Elena Fidatov (ROM)	4:14.34
6.	Małgorzata Rydz (POL)	4:14.75
7.	Gwen Griffiths (RSA)	4:14.81
8.	Annette Peters (USA)	4:15.15
9.	Harumi Hiroyama (JPN)	4:19.67
10.	Vera Chuvashova (RUS)	4:21.33
11.	Lyudmila Derevyankina (KGZ)	4:28.39
–	Karolina Tanona (FIJ)	DNS
–	Alia Al Matari (JOR)	DNS

RANK	HEAT 3	TIME
1.	Liu Dong (CHN)	4:04.36
2.	Lyudmila Rogachova (RUS)	4:07.52
3.	Fabia Trabaldo (ITA)	4:07.95
4.	Carla Sacramento (POR)	4:08.32
5.	Violeta Szekely (ROM)	4:08.82
6.	Leah Pells (CAN)	4:08.97
7.	Sandra Gasser (SUI)	4:11.75
8.	Andrea Sollárová (SVK)	4:14.47
9.	Soraya Telles (BRA)	4:18.67
10.	Gina Procaccio (USA)	4:29.17
11.	Shirley Cespedes (CRC)	4:42.15
12.	Martha Portobanco (NCA)	4:56.22
–	Simone Weidner (GER)	DNF

== See also ==
- 1990 Women's European Championships 1500 metres (Split)
- 1991 Women's World Championships 1500 metres (Tokyo)
- 1992 Women's Olympic 1500 metres (Barcelona)
- 1994 Women's European Championships 1500 metres (Helsinki)
- 1995 Women's World Championships 1500 metres (Gothenburg)
