= 1994 European Athletics Championships – Women's 1500 metres =

Women's 1500 metres at the European Athletics Championships

These are the official results of the Women's 1,500 metres event at the 1994 European Championships in Helsinki, Finland, held at Helsinki Olympic Stadium on 12 and 14 August 1994.

== Medalists ==
Gold	Lyudmila Rogachova; Russia
Silver	Kelly Holmes; United Kingdom
Bronze	Yekaterina Podkopayeva; Russia

== Results ==
=== Final ===
14 August

Rank	Name	Nationality	Time	Notes
1st place, gold medalist(s)	Lyudmila Rogachova	Russia	4:18.93	
2nd place, silver medalist(s)	Kelly Holmes	United Kingdom	4:19.30	
3rd place, bronze medalist(s)	Yekaterina Podkopayeva	Russia	4:19.37	
4	Lyubov Kremlyova	Russia	4:19.77	
5	Małgorzata Rydz	Poland	4:19.80	
6	Carla Sacramento	Portugal	4:20.62	
7	Ellen Kießling	Germany	4:20.79	
8	Mayte Zúñiga	Spain	4:20.83	
9	Anna Brzezińska	Poland	4:20.89	
10	Maria Akraka	Sweden	4:21.83	
11	Blandine Bitzner	France	4:22.64	
12	Geraldine Nolan	Ireland	4:23.59	

=== Heats ===
12 August

==== Heat 1 ====
Rank	Name	Nationality	Time	Notes
1	Yekaterina Podkopayeva	Russia	4:08.72	Q
2	Lyubov Kremlyova	Russia	4:08.80	Q
3	Anna Brzezińska	Poland	4:09.46	Q
4	Ellen Kießling	Germany	4:09.81	Q
5	Blandine Bitzner	France	4:10.56	q
6	Maria Akraka	Sweden	4:10.60	q
7	Geraldine Nolan	Ireland	4:10.89	q
8	Frédérique Quentin	France	4:11.91	
9	Yelena Bychukovskaya	Belarus	4:12.54	
10	Lynn Gibson	United Kingdom	4:13.89	
11	Katharina Orthaber	Switzerland	4:14.11	
12	Violeta Beclea	Romania	4:20.43	

==== Heat 2 ====
Rank	Name	Nationality	Time	Notes
1	Małgorzata Rydz	Poland	4:09.16	Q
2	Lyudmila Rogachova	Russia	4:09.17	Q
3	Kelly Holmes	United Kingdom	4:09.27	Q
4	Carla Sacramento	Portugal	4:09.52	Q
5	Mayte Zúñiga	Spain	4:09.53	q
6	Angela Davies	United Kingdom	4:12.09	
7	Hilde Stavik	Norway	4:12.16	
8	Sinéad Delahunty	Ireland	4:12.16	
9	Antje Beggerow	Germany	4:13.37	
10	Marjo Piipponen	Finland	4:13.71	
11	Farida Fatès	France	4:13.72	
12	Bettina Andersen	Denmark	4:15.41	
	Sonia O'Sullivan	Ireland	DNS	

== Participation ==
According to an unofficial count, 24 athletes from 15 countries participated in the event.

- Belarus (1)
- Denmark (1)
- Finland (1)
- France (3)
- Germany (2)
- Ireland (2)
- Norway (1)
- Poland (2)
- Portugal (1)
- Romania (1)
- Russia (3)
- Spain (1)
- Sweden (1)
- Switzerland (1)
- United Kingdom (3)

== See also ==
- 1990 Women's European Championships 1,500 metres (Split)
- 1991 Women's World Championships 1,500 metres (Tokyo)
- 1992 Women's Olympic 1,500 metres (Barcelona)
- 1993 Women's World Championships 1,500 metres (Stuttgart)
- 1995 Women's World Championships 1,500 metres (Gothenburg)
- 1996 Women's Olympic 1,500 metres (Atlanta)
- 1997 Women's World Championships 1,500 metres (Athens)
- 1998 Women's European Championships 1,500 metres (Budapest)
