= 1990 European Athletics Indoor Championships – Women's 1500 metres =

Event in the 1990 European Athletics Indoor Championships

The women's 1500 metres event at the 1990 European Athletics Indoor Championships was held in Kelvin Hall on 3 and 4 March.

== Medalists ==
Gold	Silver	Bronze
Doina Melinte; Romania	Sandra Gasser; Switzerland	Violeta Beclea; Romania

== Results ==
=== Heats ===
The first 3 from each heat (Q) and the next 2 fastest (q) qualified for the final.

Rank	Heat	Name	Nationality	Time	Notes
1	1	Doina Melinte	Romania	4:09.95	Q
2	1	Sandra Gasser	Switzerland	4:10.93	Q
3	1	Lyudmila Rogachova	Soviet Union	4:11.17	Q
4	1	Montserrat Pujol	Spain	4:14.51	q
5	1	Veronique Pongérard	France	4:15.23	q
6	2	Violeta Beclea	Romania	4:20.58	Q
7	2	Diane Edwards	Great Britain	4:20.77	Q
8	2	Natalya Artyomova	Soviet Union	4:21.45	Q
9	2	Małgorzata Rydz	Poland	4:22.75	
10	1	Lynne MacIntyre	Great Britain	4:22.79	
11	2	Irene Theodoridou	Greece	4:26.55	
	2	Róisín Smyth	Ireland	DNS	
	2	Elly van Hulst	Netherlands	DNS	

=== Final ===
Rank	Name	Nationality	Time	Notes
1st place, gold medalist(s)	Doina Melinte	Romania	4:09.73	
2nd place, silver medalist(s)	Sandra Gasser	Switzerland	4:10.13	
3rd place, bronze medalist(s)	Violeta Beclea	Romania	4:10.44	
4	Natalya Artyomova	Soviet Union	4:11.09	
5	Lyudmila Rogachova	Soviet Union	4:11.87	
6	Veronique Pongérard	France	4:19.36	
7	Diane Edwards	Great Britain	4:21.27	
8	Montserrat Pujol	Spain	4:33.87	
