= 1995 World Championships in Athletics – Women's 1500 metres =

These are the results of the Women's 1500 metres event at the 1995 World Championships in Athletics in Gothenburg, Sweden.

Gone were the Chinese sensations of two years earlier, not a single representative in this field, their only distance running representative in these championships incapable of making a final. The start of the final was aggressive but slow as many elbows were flying as athletes maneuvered for position at a slow pace. 1991 champion and Olympic champion Hassiba Boulmerka wanted to go into her customary second spot but found it difficult to find a leader. After 200 meters, Yvonne Graham ran around the crowd to self nominate herself into the lead, followed by Boulmerka. The leaders remained in that position for a kilometer, with the chasers right behind jockeying for position. Entering the final lap, Kelly Holmes had positioned herself in third place. Crossing the start line for the final time, the fireworks began. Boulmerka ran past Graham with Holmes less than a metre behind. With 200 to go, Boulmerka and Holmes were running stride for stride, Holmes on the outside of the turn. Carla Sacramento was the next chaser and the medalists were decided with a breakaway. By the end of the turn, Boulmerka had won the battle, but she pulled into lane 2. Holmes lined herself up in lane 1 to make a run at Boulmerka, but instead the gap kept slowly widening. The winning margin was 0.62 seconds.

== Medalists ==
Gold	Hassiba Boulmerka; Algeria (ALG)
Silver	(United Kingdom) Kelly Holmes; Great Britain (GBR)
Bronze	Carla Sacramento; Portugal (POR)

== Results ==
=== Heats ===
First 6 of each heat (Q) and the next 6 fastest (q) qualified for the semifinals.

Rank	Heat	Name	Nationality	Time	Notes
1	1	Hassiba Boulmerka	Algeria	4:11.34	Q
2	1	Kelly Holmes	Great Britain	4:11.87	Q
3	1	Lyudmila Borisova	Russia	4:12.07	Q
4	1	Sarah Thorsett	United States	4:12.10	Q
5	1	Carla Sacramento	Portugal	4:12.12	Q
6	1	Maite Zúñiga	Spain	4:12.13	Q
7	1	Petya Strashilova	Bulgaria	4:13.27	q
8	1	Maria Akraka	Sweden	4:13.38	q
9	3	Yvonne Graham	Jamaica	4:13.70	Q
10	3	Margarita Marusova	Russia	4:13.91	Q
11	3	Ruth Wysocki	United States	4:13.93	Q
12	3	Anna Brzezińska	Poland	4:14.34	Q
13	3	Theresia Kiesl	Austria	4:14.52	Q
14	3	Leah Pells	Canada	4:14.69	Q
15	1	Julia Sakara	Zimbabwe	4:15.02	q
16	3	Blandine Bitzner-Ducret	France	4:16.21	q
17	2	Kutre Dulecha	Ethiopia	4:17.70	Q
18	2	Lyudmila Rogachova	Russia	4:18.14	Q
19	2	Małgorzata Rydz	Poland	4:18.40	Q
20	2	Suzy Hamilton	United States	4:18.49	Q
21	3	Marta Domínguez	Spain	4:18.61	q
22	2	Angela Chalmers	Canada	4:18.77	Q
23	2	Frederique Quentin	France	4:18.86	Q
24	2	Yelena Bychkovskaya	Belarus	4:18.97	q
25	2	Svetlana Miroshnik	Ukraine	4:19.12	
26	3	Bigna Samuel	Saint Vincent and the Grenadines	4:25.94	
27	2	Khin Khin Htwe	Myanmar	4:26.69	
28	3	Nompumelelo Zwane	Swaziland	4:49.32	
29	2	Rosemary Omundsen	Papua New Guinea	4:51.86	
30	1	Nirmala Bharati	Nepal	4:53.60	

=== Semifinals ===
First 5 of each heat (Q) and the next 2 fastest (q) qualified for the final.

Rank	Heat	Name	Nationality	Time	Notes
1	2	Małgorzata Rydz	Poland	4:08.70	Q
2	2	Lyudmila Rogachova	Russia	4:08.72	Q
3	2	Lyudmila Borisova	Russia	4:08.83	Q
4	2	Angela Chalmers	Canada	4:08.92	Q
5	2	Ruth Wysocki	United States	4:09.03	Q
6	1	Hassiba Boulmerka	Algeria	4:09.13	Q
7	1	Kelly Holmes	Great Britain	4:09.15	Q
8	2	Maite Zúñiga	Spain	4:09.61	q
9	2	Yvonne Graham	Jamaica	4:09.62	q
10	1	Carla Sacramento	Portugal	4:10.03	Q
11	2	Suzy Hamilton	United States	4:10.28	
12	1	Anna Brzezińska	Poland	4:10.75	Q
13	1	Margarita Marusova	Russia	4:10.92	Q
14	1	Blandine Bitzner-Ducret	France	4:11.11	
15	1	Petya Strashilova	Bulgaria	4:11.62	
16	2	Frederique Quentin	France	4:11.66	
17	2	Kutre Dulecha	Ethiopia	4:11.86	
18	1	Leah Pells	Canada	4:12.07	
19	1	Sarah Thorsett	United States	4:12.26	
20	1	Theresia Kiesl	Austria	4:12.31	
21	1	Maria Akraka	Sweden	4:13.16	
22	2	Yelena Bychkovskaya	Belarus	4:15.99	
23	2	Julia Sakara	Zimbabwe	4:16.67	
24	1	Marta Domínguez	Spain	4:18.72	

=== Final ===
Rank	Name	Nationality	Time	Notes
1st place, gold medalist(s)	Hassiba Boulmerka	Algeria	4:02.42	
2nd place, silver medalist(s)	Kelly Holmes	Great Britain	4:03.04	
3rd place, bronze medalist(s)	Carla Sacramento	Portugal	4:03.79	
4	Angela Chalmers	Canada	4:04.74	
5	Lyudmila Borisova	Russia	4:04.78	
6	Anna Brzezińska	Poland	4:05.65	
7	Ruth Wysocki	United States	4:07.08	
8	Maite Zúñiga	Spain	4:07.27	
9	Lyudmila Rogachova	Russia	4:07.83	
10	Yvonne Graham	Jamaica	4:08.01	
11	Margarita Marusova	Russia	4:11.64	
12	Małgorzata Rydz	Poland	4:20.83	
