= 1994 European Athletics Indoor Championships – Women's 1500 metres =

The women's 1500 metres event at the 1994 European Athletics Indoor Championships was held in Palais Omnisports de Paris-Bercy on 13 March.

== Results ==
Rank	Name	Nationality	Time	Notes
1st place, gold medalist(s)	Yekaterina Podkopayeva	Russia	4:06.46	
2nd place, silver medalist(s)	Lyudmila Rogachova	Russia	4:06.60	
3rd place, bronze medalist(s)	Małgorzata Rydz	Poland	4:06.98	NR
4	Violeta Beclea	Romania	4:07.06	
5	Ellen Kießling	Germany	4:10.68	
6	Mayte Zúñiga	Spain	4:10.99	
7	Tudorita Chidu	Romania	4:12.13	
8	Frédérique Quentin	France	4:13.44	
9	Fabia Trabaldo	Italy	4:18.12	
	Anna Brzezińska	Poland	DNS	
	Fernanda Ribeiro	Portugal	DNS	
	Carla Sacramento	Portugal	DNS	
