= Athletics at the 1992 Summer Olympics – Women's 1500 metres =

Women's 1500 metres at the Games of the XXV Olympiad
- Venue: Estadi Olímpic de Montjuïc
- Dates: 5 August 1992 (heats); 6 August 1992 (final)
- Competitors: 43 from 35 nations
- Winning time: 3:55.30

Medalists
1st place, gold medalist(s)		Hassiba Boulmerka; Algeria
2nd place, silver medalist(s)		Lyudmila Rogachova; Unified Team
3rd place, bronze medalist(s)		Qu Yunxia; China

Official Video Highlights @ 15:30

These are the official results of the Women's 1500 metres event at the 1992 Summer Olympics in Barcelona, Spain. There were a total of 43 participating athletes. The three qualifying heats were held on August 5, followed by the two semi-finals on August 6. The final was held on August 8, 1992.

This field was stacked with the world championship podium of Algerian Hassiba Boulmerka with Tetyana Dorovskikh and Lyudmila Rogachova, who had represented the Soviet Union, but after the demise of that political entity just over eight months earlier were representing the "Unified Team." Other key competitors look to be '84 silver medalist / 800 metre gold medalist Doina Melinte, and the wild card of 800 meter specialist Maria Mutola moving up in distance. Another wild card were two young Chinese athletes, 21 year old Liu Li and 19 year old Qu Yunxia who had qualified for the final. While the Soviet Union had virtually owned the event for the previous two decades, the Chinese had no history in this event. In the World Championships the previous year, the sole Chinese representative finished last in her qualifying heat.

This was not going to be a slow tactical final. Rogachova went to the front, quickly marked by Melinte and a third former Soviet, double 1983 medalist Yekaterina Podkopayeva. Left behind at the line, Liu rushed forward on the outside, chased by Boulmerka. From last position, Qu had to work her way around PattiSue Plumer and Mutola who had dropped back expecting to pick up the pieces with her finishing kick. Dorovskikh rushed to join the party at the front, followed by Qu who had a noticeably less refined running style, rocking from side to side, looking strained. Boulmerka aggressively stuck behind Rogachova at the front, the only one to break up the Unified former Soviet bloc at the front of the pack. 700 metres into the race, Qu rocked her way past Melinte and Liu onto third place Podkopayeva's back. As the two leaders started to break, Qu followed onto Boulmerka's back. With a lap to go, the field had strung out, with Podkopayeva falling behind dramatically. Only the remaining green Unified team members were able to struggle to hold on to the three leaders with a gap back to Plummer and Mutola leading the second group. As she was falling back through the field, Melinte walked off the track at the end of the third lap. Mutola launched into what would be a long final kick, but after leaving Plummer, she wasn't making any headway. Down the backstretch, Boulmerka made her one move, accelerating past Rogachova. Rogachova couldn't answer, just holding her same speed. Dorovskikh stuck to Qu's back and made her move for bronze off the final turn. Qu looked at her and sprinted away gaining rapidly on Rogachova toward the finish. Boulmerka celebrated, flexing her muscles while the rest of the field looked exhausted. A little over a year later, Qu would set the world record that would last for 22 years.

== Medalists ==
Gold	Hassiba Boulmerka; Algeria
Silver	Lyudmila Rogachova; Unified Team
Bronze	Qu Yunxia; China

== Records ==
These were the standing world and Olympic records (in minutes) prior to the 1992 Summer Olympics.

World record	3:52.47	(Soviet Union) Tatyana Kazankina	Zürich (SUI)	August 13, 1980
Olympic record	3:53.96	(Romania) Paula Ivan	Seoul (KOR)	September 26, 1988

== Final ==
Rank	Athlete	Nation	Time	Notes
1st place, gold medalist(s)	Hassiba Boulmerka	Algeria	3:55.30	
2nd place, silver medalist(s)	Lyudmila Rogachova	Unified Team	3:56.91	
3rd place, bronze medalist(s)	Qu Yunxia	China	3:57.08	
4	Tetyana Dorovskikh	Unified Team	3:57.92	
5	Liu Li	China	4:00.20	
6	Maite Zúñiga	Spain	4:00.59	
7	Małgorzata Rydz	Poland	4:01.91	
8	Yekaterina Podkopayeva	Unified Team	4:02.03	
9	Maria de Lurdes Mutola	Mozambique	4:02.60	
10	PattiSue Plumer	United States	4:03.42	
11	Elena Fidatov	Romania	4:06.44	
—	Doina Melinte	Romania	DNF	

== Semi finals ==
Rank	Athlete	Nation	Time	Notes
1	Hassiba Boulmerka	Algeria	4:03.81	
2	Lyudmila Rogachova	Unified Team	4:03.85	
3	Maria de Lurdes Mutola	Mozambique	4:04.20	
4	Liu Li	China	4:04.35	
5	Elena Fidatov	Romania	4:04.55	
6	Angela Chalmers	Canada	4:04.87	
7	Violeta Beclea	Romania	4:05.46	
8	Letitia Vriesde	Suriname	4:09.64	
9	Kirsty Wade	Great Britain	4:11.36	
10	Maria Akraka	Sweden	4:14.30	
11	Anna Brzezińska	Poland	4:15.53	
12	Regina Jacobs	United States	4:21.55	
13	Marie Pierre Duros	France	4:26.61	

Rank	Athlete	Nation	Time	Notes
1	Tetyana Dorovskikh	Unified Team	4:03.79	
2	Małgorzata Rydz	Poland	4:03.83	
3	Qu Yunxia	China	4:03.86	
4	Yekaterina Podkopayeva	Unified Team	4:03.93	
5	Maite Zúñiga	Spain	4:04.00	
6	PattiSue Plumer	United States	4:04.23	
7	Doina Melinte	Romania	4:04.42	
8	Paula Schnurr	Canada	4:04.80	
9	Carla Sacramento	Portugal	4:05.54	
10.	Fabia Trabaldo	Italy	4:06.05	
11	Sonia O'Sullivan	Ireland	4:06.24	
12	Theresia Kiesl	Austria	4:07.46	
13	Debbie Bowker	Canada	4:12.50	

== Heats ==
Rank	Athlete	Nation	Time	Notes
1	Hassiba Boulmerka	Algeria	4:09.91	
2	Tetyana Dorovskikh	Unified Team	4:09.94	
3	Paula Schnurr	Canada	4:09.99	
4	Elena Fidatov	Romania	4:10.00	
5	Carla Sacramento	Portugal	4:10.01	
6	Liu Li	China	4:10.08	
7	Marie-Pierre Duros	France	4:10.14	
8	Maxine Newman	Great Britain	4:15.16	
9	Simone Meier	Switzerland	4:15.64	
10	Susan Sirma	Kenya	4:17.73	
11	Suzy Favor	United States	4:22.36	
12	Laurence Niyonsaba	Rwanda	4:24.87	
13	Bigna Samuel	Saint Vincent and the Grenadines	4:33.41	
14	Mantokoane Pitso	Lesotho	4:39.96	
15	Rosemary Turare	Papua New Guinea	5:10.52	

Rank	Athlete	Nation	Time	Notes
1	Maite Zúñiga	Spain	4:07.82	
2	Doina Melinte	Romania	4:08.58	
3	Małgorzata Rydz	Poland	4:09.47	
4	Lyudmila Rogachova	Unified Team	4:09.54	
5	Letitia Vriesde	Suriname	4:10.63	
6	Debbie Bowker	Canada	4:11.27	
7	Regina Jacobs	United States	4:13.87	
8	Sriyani Dhammika Manike	Sri Lanka	4:26.22	
9	Carol Galea	Malta	4:33.41	
10	Rosalie Gangué	Chad	5:06.31	
—	Ann Williams	Great Britain	DQ	
—	Fabia Trabaldo	Italy	DNF	
—	Maria Akraka	Sweden	DNF	
—	Ellen Kießling	Germany	DNF	

Rank	Athlete	Nation	Time	Notes
1	Qu Yunxia	China	4:07.40	
2	Yekaterina Podkopayeva	Unified Team	4:07.55	
3	Maria de Lurdes Mutola	Mozambique	4:07.59	
4	Violeta Beclea	Romania	4:07.60	
5	Sonia O'Sullivan	Ireland	4:07.70	
6	Angela Chalmers	Canada	4:07.75	
7	Theresia Kiesl	Austria	4:07.81	
8	Kirsty Wade	Great Britain	4:08.30	
9	Anna Brzezińska	Poland	4:08.35	
10.	PattiSue Plumer	United States	4:09.47	
11	Getenesh Urge	Ethiopia	4:18.09	
12	Khin Khin Htwe	Myanmar	4:18.81	
13	Brigitte Nganaye	Central African Republic	4:33.57 (NR)	
14	Ana Isabel Elias	Angola	4:33.66	

== See also ==
- 1990 Women's European Championships 1500 metres (Split)
- 1991 Women's World Championships 1500 metres (Tokyo)
- 1993 Women's World Championships 1500 metres (Stuttgart)
- 1994 Women's European Championships 1500 metres (Helsinki)
