= 1994 European Athletics Championships – Women's 800 metres =

Women's 800 metres at the European Athletics Championships

The women's 800 metres event at the 1994 European Athletics Championships was held in Helsinki, Finland, at Helsinki Olympic Stadium on 7, 8, and 10 August 1994.

== Medalists ==
Gold	Lyubov Gurina; Russia
Silver	Natalya Dukhnova; Belarus
Bronze	Lyudmila Rogachova; Russia

== Results ==
=== Final ===
10 August

Rank	Name	Nationality	Time	Notes
1st place, gold medalist(s)	Lyubov Gurina	Russia	1:58.55	
2nd place, silver medalist(s)	Natalya Dukhnova	Belarus	1:58.55	
3rd place, bronze medalist(s)	Lyudmila Rogachova	Russia	1:58.69	
4	Małgorzata Rydz	Poland	1:59.12	
5	Ann Griffiths	United Kingdom	1:59.81	
6	Carla Sacramento	Portugal	2:00.01	
7	Patricia Djaté	France	2:00.34	
8	Anna Brzezińska	Poland	2:00.41	
9	Irina Samorokova	Russia	2:11.50	

=== Semi-finals ===
8 August

==== Semi-final 1 ====
Rank	Name	Nationality	Time	Notes
1	Lyudmila Rogachova	Russia	2:00.93	Q
2	Natalya Dukhnova	Belarus	2:01.09	Q
3	Ann Griffiths	United Kingdom	2:01.29	Q
4	Carla Sacramento	Portugal	2:01.48	Q
4	Anna Brzezińska	Poland	2:01.48	Q
6	Christine Wachtel	Germany	2:01.84	
7	Maria Akraka	Sweden	2:02.04	
8	Karen Gydesen	Denmark	2:02.16	

==== Semi-final 2 ====
Rank	Name	Nationality	Time	Notes
1	Lyubov Gurina	Russia	2:00.77	Q
2	Patricia Djaté	France	2:00.81	Q
3	Irina Samorokova	Russia	2:00.81	Q
4	Małgorzata Rydz	Poland	2:00.83	Q
5	Stella Jongmans	Netherlands	2:01.55	
6	Diane Modahl	United Kingdom	2:02.18	
7	Malin Ewerlöf	Sweden	2:02.28	
8	Kati Kovacs	Germany	2:03.54	

=== Heats ===
7 August

==== Heat 1 ====
Rank	Name	Nationality	Time	Notes
1	Natalya Dukhnova	Belarus	2:04.49	Q
2	Irina Samorokova	Russia	2:04.52	Q
3	Diane Modahl	United Kingdom	2:04.56	Q
4	Małgorzata Rydz	Poland	2:04.57	Q
5	Ester Goossens	Netherlands	2:04.96	
6	Satu Jääskeläinen	Finland	2:08.38	
7	Lenka Švanhalová	Czech Republic	2:05.29	
8	Aisling Molloy	Ireland	2:08.46	

==== Heat 2 ====
Rank	Name	Nationality	Time	Notes
1	Carla Sacramento	Portugal	2:01.86	Q
2	Lyubov Gurina	Russia	2:01.87	Q
3	Maria Akraka	Sweden	2:01.91	Q
4	Kati Kovacs	Germany	2:02.04	Q
5	Karen Gydesen	Denmark	2:02.05	q
6	Anna Brzezińska	Poland	2:02.10	q
7	Ann Griffiths	United Kingdom	2:02.42	q
	Ellen van Langen	Netherlands	DNS	

==== Heat 3 ====
Rank	Name	Nationality	Time	Notes
1	Patricia Djaté	France	2:02.19	Q
2	Lyudmila Rogachova	Russia	2:02.74	Q
3	Stella Jongmans	Netherlands	2:02.85	Q
4	Christine Wachtel	Germany	2:03.13	Q
5	Malin Ewerlöf	Sweden	2:03.19	q
6	Yelena Zavadskaya	Ukraine	2:03.20	
7	Marjo Piipponen	Finland	2:08.81	
	Sonya Bowyer	United Kingdom	DNS	

== Participation ==
According to an unofficial count, 22 athletes from 14 countries participated in the event.

- Belarus (1)
- Czech Republic (1)
- Denmark (1)
- Finland (2)
- France (1)
- Germany (2)
- Ireland (1)
- Netherlands (2)
- Poland (2)
- Portugal (1)
- Russia (3)
- Sweden (2)
- Ukraine (1)
- United Kingdom (2)
