= 1990 European Athletics Championships – Women's 1500 metres =

Women's 1500 metres at the European Athletics Championships

These are the official results of the Women's 1500 metres event at the 1990 European Championships in Split, Yugoslavia, held at Stadion Poljud on 30 August and 1 September 1990.

== Medalists ==
Gold	Snežana Pajkić; Yugoslavia
Silver	Ellen Kießling; East Germany
Bronze	Sandra Gasser; Switzerland

== Results ==
=== Final ===
1 September

Rank	Name	Nationality	Time	Notes
1st place, gold medalist(s)	Snežana Pajkić	Yugoslavia	4:08.12	NR
2nd place, silver medalist(s)	Ellen Kießling	East Germany	4:08.67	
3rd place, bronze medalist(s)	Sandra Gasser	Switzerland	4:08.89	
4	Lyudmila Rogachova	Soviet Union	4:10.06	
5	Elena Fidatov	Romania	4:10.87	
6	Doina Melinte	Romania	4:10.91	
7	Yvonne Mai	East Germany	4:10.99	
8	Jana Kuceriková	Czechoslovakia	4:11.67	
9	Natalya Artyomova	Soviet Union	4:12.16	
10	Christina Cahill	United Kingdom	4:14.48	
11	Teena Colebrook	United Kingdom	4:15.22	
12	Violeta Beclea	Romania	4:16.45	

=== Heats ===
30 August

==== Heat 1 ====
Rank	Name	Nationality	Time	Notes
1	Sandra Gasser	Switzerland	4:08.24	Q
2	Lyudmila Rogachova	Soviet Union	4:08.30	Q
3	Yvonne Mai	East Germany	4:08.50	Q
4	Ellen Kießling	East Germany	4:08.70	Q
5	Doina Melinte	Romania	4:08.80	q
6	Jana Kuceriková	Czechoslovakia	4:09.52	q
7	Snežana Pajkić	Yugoslavia	4:09.53	q
8	Teena Colebrook	United Kingdom	4:10.93	q

==== Heat 2 ====
Rank	Name	Nationality	Time	Notes
1	Christina Cahill	United Kingdom	4:12.00	Q
2	Natalya Artyomova	Soviet Union	4:12.06	Q
3	Elena Fidatov	Romania	4:12.35	Q
4	Violeta Beclea	Romania	4:13.50	Q
5	Irene Theodoridou	Greece	4:14.10	
6	Montserrat Pujol	Spain	4:15.72	
7	Bev Nicholson	United Kingdom	4:23.80	

== Participation ==
According to an unofficial count, 15 athletes from 9 countries participated in the event.

- Czechoslovakia (1)
- East Germany (2)
- Greece (1)
- Romania (3)
- Soviet Union (2)
- Spain (1)
- Switzerland (1)
- United Kingdom (3)
- Yugoslavia (1)

== See also ==
- 1988 Women's Olympic 1500 metres (Seoul)
- 1991 Women's World Championships 1500 metres (Tokyo)
- 1992 Women's Olympic 1500 metres (Barcelona)
