= Małgorzata Rydz =

Polish middle-distance runner

Personal information
- Nationality: Polish
- Born: 18 January 1967 (age 59) Kłobuck, Poland
- Height: 1.65 m (5 ft 5 in)
- Weight: 54 kg (119 lb)

Sport
- Sport: Athletics
- Event: 1500 metres
Medal record
Women's athletics
Representing Poland
European Indoor Championships
Bronze medal – third place	1994 Paris	1500 m
Bronze medal – third place	1996 Stockholm	1500 m

Małgorzata Urszula Rydz-Kapkowska (born 18 January 1967 in Kłobuck, Śląskie) is a former female middle-distance runner from Poland, who represented her native country at two consecutive Summer Olympics, starting in Barcelona, Spain (1992). She set her personal best (4:01.91) in the women's 1,500 metres event in 1992.

== International competitions ==
Year	Competition	Venue	Position	Event	Notes
Representing Poland
1989	European Indoor Championships	The Hague, Netherlands	5th	1500 m	4:09.42
1989	World Indoor Championships	Budapest, Hungary	8th	1500 m	4:17.53
1990	European Indoor Championships	Glasgow, United Kingdom	9th (h)	1500 m	4:22.75
1991	World Indoor Championships	Seville, Spain	11th (sf)	800 m	2:03.54
1991	World Championships	Tokyo, Japan	8th	1500 m	4:05.52
1992	Olympic Games	Barcelona, Spain	7th	1500 m	4:01.91
1992	World Cup	Havana, Cuba	2nd	1500 m	4:18.16
1993	World Indoor Championships	Toronto, Canada	6th (h)	1500 m	4:12.94
1993	World Championships	Stuttgart, Germany	24th (h)	1500 m	4:14.75
1994	European Indoor Championships	Paris, France	3rd	1500 m	4:06.98
1994	European Championships	Helsinki, Finland	4th	800 m	1:59.12
1994	European Championships	Helsinki, Finland	5th	1500 m	4:19.80
1995	World Championships	Gothenburg, Sweden	12th	1500 m	4:20.83
1996	European Indoor Championships	Stockholm, Sweden	3rd	1500 m	4:10.50
1996	Olympic Games	Atlanta, United States	8th	1500 m	4:05.92
1997	World Championships	Athens, Greece	15th (sf)	800 m	2:05.00
1997	World Championships	Athens, Greece	12th	1500 m	4:13.25
