= Kelly Holmes =

British middle-distance runner (born 1970)

Dame Kelly Holmes DBE OLY
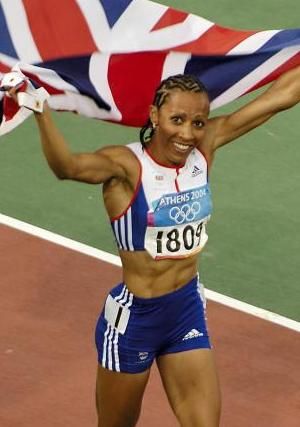
- Holmes at the 2004 Summer Olympics

Personal information
- Born: 19 April 1970 (age 56) Pembury, Kent, England
- Height: 1.64 m (5 ft 5 in)
- Website: kellyholmes.co.uk
- Military career
- Allegiance: United Kingdom
- Branch: British Army; Women's Royal Army Corps (1988–1992); Adjutant General's Corps (1992–1997)
- Service years: 1988–1997
- Rank: Sergeant

Sport
- Country: Great Britain; England
- Sport: Running
- Events: 800 metres, 1500 m
- Club: Middlesex Ladies/ESM

Achievements and titles
- Personal bests: 800 m: 1:56.21 (Monaco 1995); 1500 m: 3:57.90 (Athens 2004); Indoors; 800 m: 1:59.21i (Ghent 2003)
Medal record
Women's athletics
Representing Great Britain
Olympic Games
Gold medal – first place	2004 Athens	800 m
Gold medal – first place	2004 Athens	1500 m
Bronze medal – third place	2000 Sydney	800 m
World Championships
Silver medal – second place	1995 Gothenburg	1500 m
Silver medal – second place	2003 Paris	800 m
Bronze medal – third place	1995 Gothenburg	800 m
World Indoor Championships
Silver medal – second place	2003 Birmingham	1500 m
European Championships
Silver medal – second place	1994 Helsinki	1500 m
Bronze medal – third place	2002 Munich	800 m
Representing England
Commonwealth Games
Gold medal – first place	1994 Victoria	1500 m
Gold medal – first place	2002 Manchester	1500 m
Silver medal – second place	1998 Kuala Lumpur	1500 m

Dame Kelly Holmes (born 19 April 1970) is a retired British middle distance athlete and television personality.

Holmes specialised in the 800 and 1500 metres events and won gold medals for both distances at the 2004 Summer Olympics in Athens. She set British records in numerous events and still holds the records over the 600, and 1000 metre distances. She held the British 800 metre record until 2021.

Inspired by a number of successful British middle-distance runners in the early 1980s, Holmes began competing in middle-distance events in her youth. She joined the British Army, but continued to compete at the organisation's athletics events. She turned to the professional athletics circuit in 1993 and in 1994 she won the 1500 m at the Commonwealth Games and took silver at the European Championships. She won a silver and a bronze medal at the 1995 Gothenburg World Championships, but suffered from various injuries over the following years, failing to gain a medal at her first Olympics in Atlanta 1996 when running with a stress fracture. She won silver in the 1500 m at the 1998 Commonwealth Games and bronze in the 800 m at the 2000 Sydney Olympics, her first Olympic medal.

Holmes won the 1500 m at the 2002 Commonwealth Games and the 800 m bronze at the Munich European Championships that year. The 2003 track season saw her take silver in the 1500 m at the World Indoor Championships and the 800 m silver medals at the World Championships and first World Athletics Final.

She took part in her final major championship in 2004, with a double gold medal-winning performance at the Athens Olympics, finishing as the 800 m and 1500 m Olympic Champion. For her achievements she won numerous awards and was appointed Dame Commander of the Order of the British Empire (DBE) in 2005. She retired from athletics in 2005 and was between 2018 and 2024 an honorary colonel with the Royal Armoured Corps Training Regiment (RACTR). She has become a global motivational speaker, published five books, her latest being Running Life, and made a number of television appearances.

== Early life and army career ==
Holmes was born in Pembury, near Tunbridge Wells in Kent, the daughter of Derrick Holmes, a Jamaican-born car mechanic, and an English mother, Pam Norman. Her mother was 17 at the time of her birth, and seven years later married painter and decorator Michael Norris, whom Holmes regards as her father. Holmes grew up in Hildenborough, Kent, where she attended Hildenborough CEP School, and then Hugh Christie Comprehensive School in Tonbridge from the age of 12.

She started training for athletics at the age of 12, joining Tonbridge Athletics Club, where she was coached by David Arnold and went on to win the English Schools 1500 metres in her second season in 1983. Her hero was British middle-distance runner Steve Ovett, and she was inspired by his success at the 1980 Summer Olympics.

However, Holmes later turned away from athletics, joining the British Army one month before turning 18, having left school two years earlier to work first as an assistant in a sweet shop and later as a nursing assistant for disabled patients. In the army, she became a HGV driver in the Women's Royal Army Corps (WRAC), later becoming a basic physical training instructor (PTI). Holmes then elected in June 1990 to attend the first course to be run under the army's new physical training syllabus, and passed out as a Class 2 PTI. Although militarily quite young, Holmes's athletic prowess was impressive and she was encouraged to attend the course selection for full-time transfer to the Royal Army Physical Training Corps (RAPTC) at Aldershot.

Holmes eventually qualified as a class 1 PTI, although she remained in the Adjutant General's Corps after the disbandment of the WRAC in 1992. She also became British Army judo champion and at an athletics event, she competed in and won an 800 metres, a 3000 metres and a relay race in a single day. She also won the heptathlon.

Holmes watched the 1992 Summer Olympics on television, and on seeing Lisa York in the heats of the 3000 metres – an athlete whom she had competed against, and beaten – she decided to return to athletics. For several years she combined athletics with employment in the army, until increased funding allowed her to become a full-time athlete in 1997.

== Athletics career ==
=== Early and pre-Athens career ===
Highlights of her early and pre-Athens career included gold medals at the Commonwealth Games and silvers at the World and European Championships. In 2000 she also took a bronze at the Sydney Olympics.

=== 2004 Athens Olympic Games ===
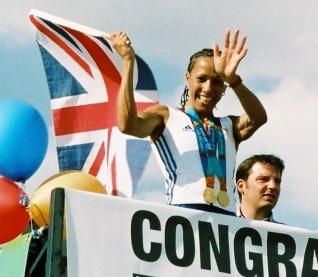
Holmes on parade

In 2017, Holmes revealed that after training in 2003 for the 2004 Summer Olympics at a French training camp where she suffered leg injuries and became depressed, she began cutting herself. "I made one cut for every day that I had been injured", Holmes stated in an interview with the News of the World newspaper. At least once, she considered suicide, but she eventually sought help from a doctor and was diagnosed with clinical depression. While she could not use anti-depressants because it would affect her performance, she began using herbal serotonin tablets. In 2005, after her achievements at the 2004 Summer Olympics, Holmes chose to talk about her self-harm to show others that being a professional athlete is an extremely difficult thing to do and places the athlete under tremendous amounts of stress. Holmes's honesty quickly won her praise from people on Twitter.

2004 saw Holmes arrive at a major competition, the Athens Olympics, with no injury worries for just about the first time in her career. She had originally planned to compete in just the 1500 m but a victory over Jolanda Čeplak before the games had many saying she should take her chance in the 800 m as well. Holmes did not announce her decision to race in both events until five days before the 800 m finals. Along with three time World Champion Maria de Lurdes Mutola and Čeplak, Holmes was considered one of the favourites for the gold medal in the 800 m. In the final, Holmes ran a well-paced race, ignoring a fast start by a number of the other competitors, and moved into the lead ahead of Mutola on the final bend, taking the gold on the line ahead of Hasna Benhassi and Čeplak, with Mutola in fourth. Holmes became the seventh British woman to win an athletics gold, and the second after Ann Packer in 1964 to win the 800 metres.

=== Personal bests ===
Event	Time	Venue	Date
600 metres	1:25.41 (British record)	Liège, Belgium	2 September 2003
800 metres	1:56.21 (British record until 2021)	Monte Carlo, Monaco	9 September 1995
800 metres indoor	1:59.21	Ghent, Belgium	9 February 2003
1000 metres	2:32.55 (British record)	Leeds, United Kingdom	15 June 1997
1000 metres indoor	2:32.96	Birmingham, United Kingdom	20 February 2004
1500 metres	3:57.90	Athens, Greece	28 August 2004
1500 metres indoor	4:02.66	Birmingham, United Kingdom	16 March 2003
One mile	4:28.04	Glasgow, United Kingdom	30 August 1998
3000 metres	9:01.91	Gateshead, United Kingdom	13 July 2003

- All information taken from IAAF profile and UK All time lists.

=== Competition record ===
Representing Great Britain and England
Year	Competition	Venue	Position	Event	Result
1993	World Championships	Stuttgart, Germany	5th (sf)	800 m	1:58.64
1994	Commonwealth Games	Victoria, Canada	1st	1500 m	4:08.86
1994	European Championships	Helsinki, Finland	2nd	1500 m	4:19.30
1994	IAAF World Cup	London, England	3rd	1500 m	4:10.81
1994	European Cup	Birmingham, England	2nd	1500 m	4:06.48
1995	World Championships	Gothenburg, Sweden	3rd	800 m	1:56.95
1995	World Championships	Gothenburg, Sweden	2nd	1500 m	4:03.04
1995	European Cup	Villeneuve-d'Ascq, France	1st	1500 m	4:07.02
1996	European Cup	Madrid, Spain	2nd	800 m	1:58.20
1996	Olympic Games	Atlanta, United States	4th	800 m	1:58.81
1996	Olympic Games	Atlanta, United States	11th	1500 m	4:07.46
1997	European Cup	Munich, Germany	1st	1500 m	4:04.79
1998	Commonwealth Games	Kuala Lumpur, Malaysia	2nd	1500 m	4:06.10
1999	World Championships	Seville, Spain	4th (sf)	800 m	2:00.77
2000	Summer Olympics	Sydney, Australia	3rd	800 m	1:56.80
2000	Summer Olympics	Sydney, Australia	7th	1500 m	4:08.02
2001	World Championships	Edmonton, Canada	6th	800 m	1:59.76
2002	European Championships	Munich, Germany	3rd	800 m	1:59.83
2002	European Championships	Munich, Germany	11th (h)	1500 m	4:08.11
2002	Commonwealth Games	Manchester, England	1st	1500 m	4:05.99
2003	World Championships	Paris, France	2nd	800 m	2:00.18
2003	World Indoor Championships	Birmingham, England	2nd	1500 m	4:02.66
2003	IAAF World Athletics Final	Monte Carlo, Monaco	2nd	800 m	1:59.92
2004	World Indoor Championships	Budapest, Hungary	9th	1500 m	4:12.30
2004	Summer Olympics	Athens, Greece	1st	800 m	1:56.38
2004	Summer Olympics	Athens, Greece	1st	1500 m	3:57.90
2004	IAAF World Athletics Final	Monte Carlo, Monaco	1st	1500 m	4:04.55

- Note: In addition to these achievements, Holmes has also won 12 national titles.

== Honours and awards ==
Dame Commander of the Order of the British Empire (DBE)	(Civil Division) 2005 "for services to athletics". She was invested with the honour by HM The Queen at Buckingham Palace on 9 March 2005, accompanied by her parents and grandfather.
Member of the Order of the British Empire (MBE)	(Military Division) 1998 "for services to the British Army".

In 2007, she was awarded an Honorary Doctorate from Loughborough University.

In 2010, Holmes was inducted into the England Athletics Hall of Fame.

In 2018, she was made honorary colonel of the Royal Armoured Corps Training Regiment, serving as such until 1 November 2024.

== Dame Kelly Holmes Trust ==
In 2008, Holmes founded the Dame Kelly Holmes Trust, a registered charity, to support young athletes and help the lives of young people facing disadvantage across the UK. As part of her pledge to the charity, she participated in the Powerman UK duathlon in 2014, one of several fundraising events she took part in.

== Post-athletics career ==
Since 2004, Holmes has taken part in "On Camp with Kelly" athletics camps which train junior athletes, sponsored by insurance company Aviva (formerly Norwich Union).

In 2005, she won the Laureus World Sports Award for Sportswoman of the Year. The same year, she named the P&O Cruise ship MS Arcadia. On 21 August, she competed in her final race in the UK, the 800 m at the Norwich Union British Grand Prix meeting in Sheffield. Her training schedule during the summer of 2005 had been disrupted by a recurrent Achilles tendon injury, and she finished the race in eighth place, limping across the finish line and completing a lap of honour on a buggy.

On 6 December 2005, Holmes announced her retirement from athletics, saying she had reassessed her future after the death of a friend, as well as citing a lack of motivation to continue.

In May 2009, Holmes was named as the president of Commonwealth Games England, succeeding Sir Chris Chataway, who had held the post since 1994. The organisation's chairman Sir Andrew Foster said: "Dame Kelly has been an outstanding athlete both for Team England and Great Britain. She is a truly inspirational and respected figure in the sporting world and will be a wonderful ambassador for Commonwealth Games England."

On 18 March 2019, Holmes, along with Paula Radcliffe and Sharron Davies, announced they would be writing a letter to the International Olympic Committee targeting trans women who compete in women's sports categories. Holmes's tone would change by January 2023, when she spoke again on the subject of transgender individuals' inclusion in sports stating "I have been ignorant in the past about the fight of the trans community and I now want to see fair and conclusive outcome for those whose gender differs from that assigned at birth, in all walks of life, including sport."

Holmes is known for her advocacy on various health-related topics, particularly mental health and menopause. She regularly attends and promotes parkrun events, and says "these days it is about improving health and well-being, inspiring people to take exercise, meet neighbours and volunteer".

=== Television and radio ===
In November 2010, Holmes took part in the ITV game show The Cube. In October 2011, she appeared live on Dubai One lifestyle show Studio One where she talked about her life and career after athletics.

In 2013 Holmes became the face of MoneyForce, a programme run by the Royal British Legion to deliver money advice to the UK armed forces.

In early 2015, she took part in the ITV series Bear Grylls: Mission Survive and was the runner-up after a 12-day survival mission.

In 2017, Holmes presented episode five of the BBC One television series Women at War: 100 Years of Service.

In December 2017, Holmes spoke about her 2003 mental health issues in an episode of All in the Mind on BBC Radio 4 and in 2018 was one of the judges of the programme's awards.

Since September 2022, Holmes has been a regular panelist on the ITV Loose Women talk show.

=== Cafe 1809 and The 1809 Hub ===
In 2014 Holmes opened a cafe and community hub in Hildenborough named Cafe 1809 after her 2004 Olympics bib number. She opened a sister branch of the cafe in Gravesend in 2017, but this closed after a few months.

In October 2018 Holmes announced the cafe would close the following month, before re-opening as The 1809 Hub: "a space for events, pop-ups, and community gatherings".

== Personal life ==
In June 2022, Holmes came out as gay in an interview with the Sunday Mirror, adding that she felt "finally free". She said that she had known she was a lesbian since 1988, when she was in the army; she could not come out then, as until January 2000 it was not permitted to be gay in the UK military. After winning two Olympic gold medals at Athens in 2004 and becoming a public figure, she feared there might still be consequences from the army if she came out after leaving, and that she might be shunned within athletics as there were no openly gay sportspeople she knew of. LGBT campaigners celebrated Holmes coming out, saying that it sheds light on the historic homophobia that can still serve as a barrier to older people coming out.

Later that month, on 26 June, ITV broadcast a 55-minute documentary Kelly Holmes: Being Me in which she describes her fears of her sexuality being exposed, and meets two people who were discharged from the military for being gay. Holmes wrote: "The documentary taught me so much about generational and social advancements when it comes to the LGBTQ+ world."

== Artistic recognition ==
In 2012, Holmes was one of five Olympians chosen for a series of body-casting artworks by Louise Giblin. These were exhibited in London, with copies being sold in aid of the charity Headfirst.

== Bibliography ==
- Holmes, Kelly; Richard Lewis (2004). My Olympic Ten Days. Virgin Books. ISBN 1-85227-222-8.
- Holmes, Kelly (2005). Kelly Holmes: Black, White & Gold: The Autobiography. Virgin Books. ISBN 1-85227-224-4.

Awards
Preceded by (Sweden) Carolina Klüft	Women's European Athlete of the Year; 2004	Succeeded by (Russia) Yelena Isinbayeva
Preceded by (England) Jonny Wilkinson	BBC Sports Personality of the Year; 2004	Succeeded by (England) Andrew Flintoff
Preceded by (Sweden) Annika Sörenstam	World Sportswoman of the Year; 2005	Succeeded by (Croatia) Janica Kostelić
