= Thorsett =

Thorsett is a surname. Notable people with the surname include:

- Sarah Thorsett (born 1970), American middle-distance runner
- Stephen E. Thorsett (born 1964), American academic and astronomer
