= 1992 European Athletics Indoor Championships – Women's 1500 metres =

The women's 1500 metres event at the 1992 European Athletics Indoor Championships was held in Palasport di Genova on 29 February and 1 March.

== Medalists ==
Gold	Silver	Bronze
Yekaterina Podkopayeva; Unified Team	Lyubov Kremlyova; Unified Team	Doina Melinte; Romania

== Results ==
=== Heats ===
First 3 from each heat (Q) and the next 2 fastest (q) qualified for the final.

Rank	Heat	Name	Nationality	Time	Notes
1	1	Tudorita Chidu	Romania	4:09.52	Q
2	1	Yekaterina Podkopayeva	Unified Team	4:09.53	Q
3	1	Theresia Kiesl	Austria	4:09.62	Q
4	1	Maria Akraka	Sweden	4:09.78	q
5	1	Anna Brzezińska	Poland	4:11.14	q
6	2	Doina Melinte	Romania	4:12.10	Q
7	2	Lyubov Kremlyova	Unified Team	4:12.25	Q
8	2	Ivana Kubešová	Czechoslovakia	4:12.35	Q
9	2	Elisa Rea	Italy	4:12.77	
10	2	Christina Cahill	Great Britain	4:14.46	
11	2	Malahat Kokalp	Turkey	4:21.67	
	1	Carla Sacramento	Portugal	DNF	

=== Final ===
Rank	Name	Nationality	Time	Notes
1st place, gold medalist(s)	Yekaterina Podkopayeva	Unified Team	4:06.61	
2nd place, silver medalist(s)	Lyubov Kremlyova	Unified Team	4:06.62	
3rd place, bronze medalist(s)	Doina Melinte	Romania	4:06.90	
4	Tudorita Chidu	Romania	4:08.30	
5	Theresia Kiesl	Austria	4:08.82	
6	Anna Brzezińska	Poland	4:09.05	
7	Ivana Kubešová	Czechoslovakia	4:09.43	
8	Maria Akraka	Sweden	4:09.56	
