= Khin Khin Htwe =

Burmese middle-distance runner

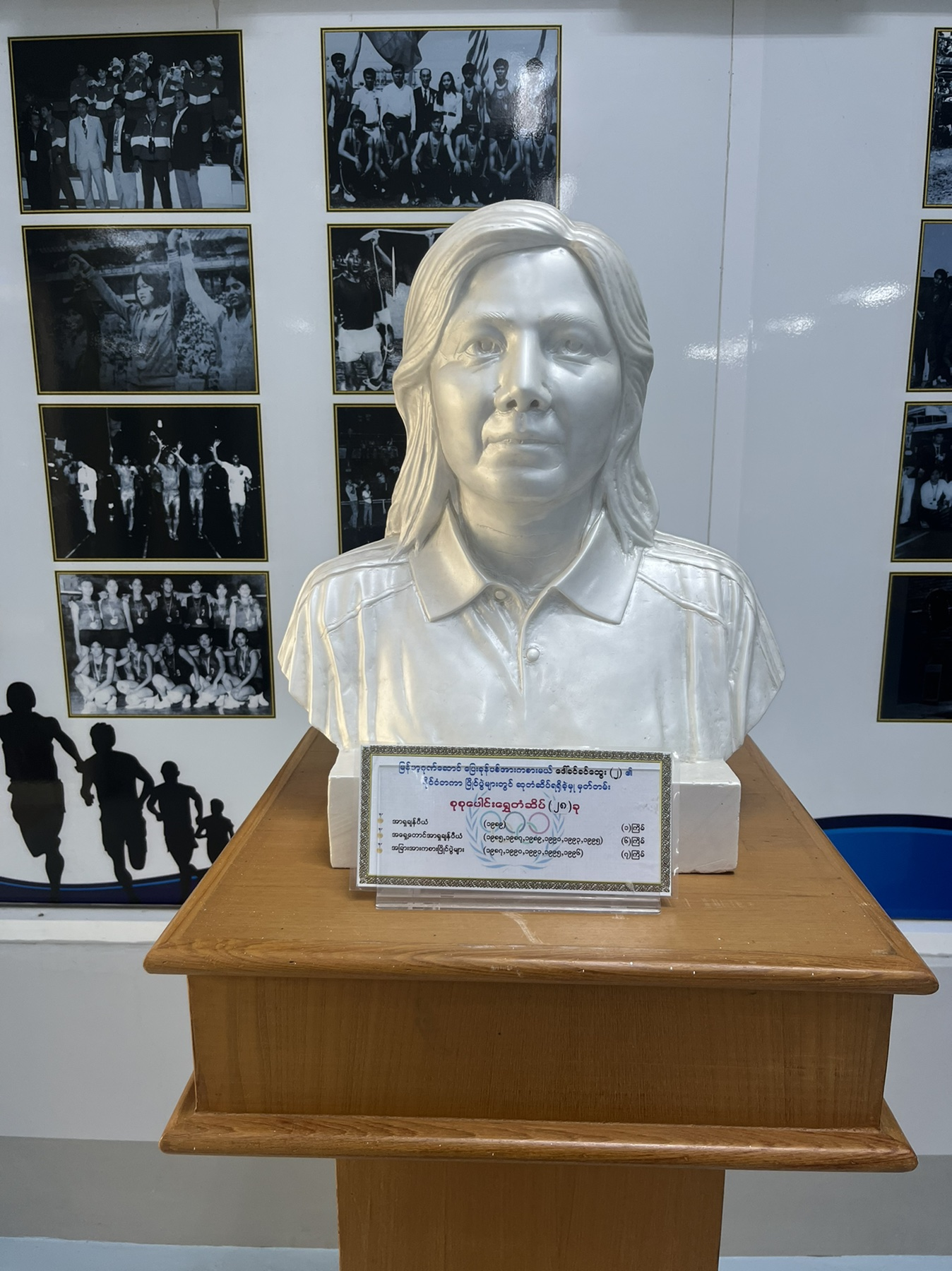
- Statue in Sports Museum

Personal information
- Nationality: Burmese
- Born: 29 November 1967
- Died: 30 September 2021 (aged 53)
- Height: 1.64 m (5 ft 5 in)
- Weight: 44 kg (97 lb)

Sport
- Sport: Running
- Events: 1500 m, 3000 m
Medal record
Women's athletics
Representing Myanmar
Asian Games
Bronze medal – third place	1990 Beijing	1500m
Bronze medal – third place	1994 Hiroshima	1500m
Asian Championships
Gold medal – first place	1989 New Delhi	1500 m
Silver medal – second place	1991 Kuala Lumpur	1500 m
Bronze medal – third place	1989 New Delhi	3000 m
Bronze medal – third place	1991 Kuala Lumpur	3000 m
Southeast Asian Games
Gold medal – first place	1985 Bangkok	3000m

Khin Khin Htwe (29 November 1967 – 30 September 2021) was a Burmese athlete who competed in the middle-distance events. She represented her country at three consecutive Summer Olympics, starting in 1988, as well as two World Championships. In addition, she won multiple medals on regional level.

She still holds national records in the 1500 and 3000 metres.

== Competition record ==
Year	Competition	Venue	Position	Event	Notes
Representing Myanmar
1985	Southeast Asian Games	Bangkok, Thailand	3rd	1500 m	4:31.26
1985	Southeast Asian Games	Bangkok, Thailand	1st	3000 m	9:33.06
1987	Southeast Asian Games	Jakarta, Indonesia	1st	3000 m	9:35.35
1988	Olympic Games	Seoul, South Korea	23rd (h)	1500 m	4:20.92
1988	Olympic Games	Seoul, South Korea	29th (h)	3000 m	9:26.57
1989	Asian Championships	New Delhi, India	1st	1500 m	4:21.06
1989	Asian Championships	New Delhi, India	3rd	3000 m	9:22.80
1989	Southeast Asian Games	Kuala Lumpur, Malaysia	1st	800 m	2:08.99
1989	Southeast Asian Games	Kuala Lumpur, Malaysia	1st	1500 m	4:22.25
1989	Southeast Asian Games	Kuala Lumpur, Malaysia	1st	3000 m	9:26.15
1990	Asian Games	Beijing, China	3rd	1500 m	4:25.03
1991	Asian Championships	Kuala Lumpur, Malaysia	2nd	1500 m	4:26.08
1991	Asian Championships	Kuala Lumpur, Malaysia	3rd	3000 m	9:19.36
1991	World Championships	Tokyo, Japan	22nd (h)	1500 m	4:12.21
1991	World Championships	Tokyo, Japan	25th (h)	3000 m	9:07.34
1992	Olympic Games	Barcelona, Spain	29th (h)	1500 m	4:18.81
1992	Olympic Games	Barcelona, Spain	28th (h)	3000 m	9:31.70
1994	Asian Games	Hiroshima, Japan	3rd	1500 m	4:18.00
1995	World Championships	Gothenburg, Sweden	27th (h)	1500 m	4:26.69
1996	Olympic Games	Atlanta, United States	32nd (h)	1500 m	4:30.64

== Personal bests ==
Outdoor

•10000metres-35:44.45(Philippines

- 800 metres – 2:05.67 (Beijing 1990)
- 1500 metres – 4:12.21 (Tokyo 1991)
- 3000 metres – 9:04.56 (Hiroshima 1994)
- 5000 metres – 16:42.31 (Jakarta 1987)
