= Anna Brzezińska (athlete) =

Polish-New Zealand distance runner

Personal information
- Born: 9 January 1971 (age 55) Brzeg, Poland
- Height: 171 cm (5 ft 7 in)
- Weight: 57 kg (126 lb)

Sport
- Sport: Track and field
- Event: Middle-distance running
Medal record
Women's athletics
Representing Poland
European Indoor Championships
Bronze medal – third place	1994 Paris	3000 m

Anna Brzezińska (born 9 January 1971 in Brzeg, Opole Voivodeship) is a retired Polish middle-distance runner who specialized in the 1500 metres. She adopted New Zealand nationality on 22 January 1999.

== Achievements ==
Year	Competition	Venue	Position	Event	Notes
Representing Poland
1992	European Indoor Championships	Genoa, Italy	6th	1500 m	4:09.05
1992	Olympic Games	Barcelona, Spain	24th (sf)	1500 m	4:15.53
1993	World Indoor Championships	Toronto, Canada	4th	1500 m	4:11.15
1993	World Championships	Stuttgart, Germany	15th (h)	800 m	2:01.67
1993	World Championships	Stuttgart, Germany	7th	1500 m	4:08.11
1994	European Indoor Championships	Paris, France	3rd	3000 m	8:56.90
1994	European Championships	Helsinki, Finland	8th	800 m	2:00.41
1994	European Championships	Helsinki, Finland	9th	1500 m	4:20.89
1995	World Championships	Gothenburg, Sweden	6th	1500 m	4:05.65
1996	Olympic Games	Atlanta, United States	12th	1500 m	4:08.27
1998	Australian Championships	Melbourne, Australia	3rd	1500 m	4:15.76
