= Yekaterina Podkopayeva =

Retired middle-distance runner

Medal record

Women's athletics

Representing Russia

European Championships
Bronze medal – third place	1994 Helsinki	1500 m

Yekaterina Ilyinychna Podkopayeva, née Poryvkina, (Russian: Екатерина Подкопаева; born 11 June 1952) is a retired middle-distance runner who represented the USSR and later Russia. She was born in Moscow, and gained international recognition in 1983, when she won two bronze medals at the World Championships (in 800 and 1500 metres). The same year she managed an 800 m time of 1:55.96. She resurfaced in 1992, winning the European Indoor Championships and placing 8th in the Olympics. More victories in European and World Indoor Championships followed until she retired after the 1998 season. When she won the 1500 metres at the 1997 World Indoors, she was 44, the oldest World Indoor champion ever.

== International competitions ==
Year	Competition	Venue	Position	Event	Notes
Representing the Soviet Union
1983	World Championships	Helsinki, Finland	3rd	800 m	1:57.58
1983	World Championships	Helsinki, Finland	3rd	1500 m	4:02.25
1984	Friendship Games	Moscow, Soviet Union	3rd	1500 m	4:01.61
1990	Goodwill Games	Seattle, United States	2nd	1500 m	4:09.91
Representing Unified Team
1992	European Indoor Championships	Genoa, Italy	1st	1500 m	4:06.61
1992	Olympic Games	Barcelona, Spain	8th	1500 m	4:02.03
1992	World Cup	Havana, Cuba	1st	1500 m	4:17.60
Representing Russia
1993	World Indoor Championships	Toronto, Canada	1st	1500 m	4:09.29
1994	European Indoor Championships	Paris, France	1st	1500 m	4:06.46
1994	European Championships	Helsinki, Finland	3rd	1500 m	4:19.37
1996	European Indoor Championships	Stockholm, Sweden	2nd	1500 m	4:09.65
1997	World Indoor Championships	Paris, France	1st	1500 m	4:05.19

== Personal bests ==
- 800 metres - 1:55.96 (1983)
- 1000 metres - 2:37.27 (1993)
- 1500 metres - 3:56.65 (1984)
- Mile run - 4:23.78 (1993)

== See also ==
- List of World Athletics Championships medalists (women)
- List of IAAF World Indoor Championships medalists (women)
- List of European Athletics Championships medalists (women)
- List of European Athletics Indoor Championships medalists (women)
- List of masters athletes
- 800 metres at the World Championships in Athletics
- 1500 metres at the World Championships in Athletics
