= Bigna Samuel =

Vincentian middle-distance runner (born 1965)

Personal information
- Born: 9 November 1965 (age 60)

Sport
- Country: Saint Vincent and the Grenadines
- Sport: Athletics

Bigna Alinda Samuel (born 9 November 1965) is a Vincentian middle-distance runner who competed at the 1992 Summer Olympics in Barcelona, Spain, and also competed in three IAAF World Championships.

== Career ==
Samuel competed at the 1983 World Championships in Athletics in the 1500 metres and she came 8th in her heat and failed to advance to the final. Eight years later at the 1991 World Championships in Athletics Samuel competed in two events, first up was the 3000 metres and she came 11th in her heat out of 14 runners, then five days later she competed in the 1500 metres where again she finished 11th in her heat and failed to advance to the final.

The following year Samuel was picked to represent Saint Vincent and the Grenadines at the 1992 Summer Olympics in the 1500 metres, she ran in the first heat and after running a time of 4:33.41 she finished 13th out of 15 starters in her heat so not advancing to the semi-finals.

In 1995 Samuel competed in her third IAAF World Championships in Athletics when she traveled to Gothenburg, Sweden, she again competed in the 1500 metres, although she finished 9th in her heat she was less than seconds behind from qualifying for the next round.
