= Simone Meier =

Swiss middle-distance runner

Personal information
- Nationality: Swiss
- Born: 15 November 1965 (age 60)

Sport
- Sport: Middle-distance running
- Event: 1500 metres

Simone Meier (born 15 November 1965) is a Swiss middle-distance runner. She competed in the women's 1500 metres at the 1992 Summer Olympics.
