= Hassiba Boulmerka =

Algerian middle-distance runner

Personal information
- Born: 10 July 1968 (age 58) Constantine, Algeria
- Height: 162 cm (5 ft 4 in)
- Weight: 52 kg (115 lb)

Sport
- Country: Algeria
- Sport: Track
- Events: 800 metres and 1500 metres
- Turned pro: 1986
- Retired: 1997
Medal record
Women's athletics
Representing Algeria
Olympic Games
Gold medal – first place	1992 Barcelona	1500 m
World Championships
Gold medal – first place	1991 Tokyo	1500 m
Gold medal – first place	1995 Gothenburg	1500 m
Bronze medal – third place	1993 Stuttgart	1500 m
Mediterranean Games
Gold medal – first place	1991 Athens	800 m
Gold medal – first place	1991 Athens	1500 m
Gold medal – first place	1993 Narbonne	800 m
Silver medal – second place	1993 Narbonne	1500 m
African Championships
Gold medal – first place	1989 Lagos	1500 m
Gold medal – first place	1989 Lagos	800 m
Gold medal – first place	1988 Annaba	1500 m
Gold medal – first place	1988 Annaba	800 m

Hassiba Boulmerka (Arabic: حسيبة بولمرقة, born 10 July 1968) is a former Algerian middle distance athlete. While under threat of death from fanatics, she won Algeria's first Olympic gold medal.

== Career ==
Born in Constantine in northeastern Algeria, Boulmerka started running seriously at the age of ten, specializing in the 800 and 1,500 metres. She was successful in national and regional races, although there wasn't much competition. Her first major international tournament was the 1988 Summer Olympics in Seoul, where she was eliminated in the preliminary heat of both the 800 and 1,500 m.

Boulmerka's performances gradually improved, and her big breakthrough came in 1991. The first major race she won was the 800 m at the Golden Gala race in Rome. A month later, she competed at the World Championships. On the last straight of the 1500 m final, she sprinted to victory, becoming the first African woman to win an athletics world title.

Her performance did not attract just positive attention. She was also frequently criticized by Muslim groups in Algeria who thought she showed too much of her body when racing. Boulmerka received death threats and was forced to move to Europe to train. In spite of this, she was one of the favourites for the 1500 m gold medal at the 1992 Barcelona Olympics. In the final, she fought off Lyudmila Rogachova and Qu Yunxia (world record holder until 2015) for the gold medal. It was Algeria's first gold medal at the Olympic Games.

Boulmerka's next two seasons were not as successful, although she won a bronze medal at the 1993 World Championships in Stuttgart. In 1995, she hadn't won a single race going into the World Championships in Gothenburg, but this did not prevent her from winning her second world title. It was her only victory of that season, and her last major victory. She competed at the Centennial Olympics in Atlanta, but sprained her ankle in the semi-finals. After the 1997 season, in which she did not defend her world title, she retired from sport.

Boulmerka was later elected to the Athletes' Commission of the International Olympic Committee.

She formerly held the 1,500 metres African record with her time of 3:55.30 run on 8 August 1992 in Barcelona. She also held the one mile African record of 4:20.79, set in 1991 in Oslo, for 17 years until it was beaten by Gelete Burka of Ethiopia, who timed 4:18.23 in 2008.

== Post-athletics career ==
Boulmerka has returned to Algeria and is now a businesswoman.
