= Laurence Niyonsaba =

Rwandan athlete (born 1973)

Personal information
- Nationality: Rwandan
- Born: 14 June 1973 (age 53)

Sport
- Sport: Middle-distance running
- Event: 1500 metres

Laurence Niyonsaba (born 14 June 1973) is a Rwandan middle-distance runner. She competed in the women's 1500 metres at the 1992 Summer Olympics.

== Career ==
Niyonsaba was the only 1500 m runner to qualify and represent Rwanda at the 1992 Summer Olympics. At the Games, Niyonsaba finished 11th in her heat and failed to advance to the finals.

In April 1993, Niyonsaba set a Rwandan national record of 2:51.7 in the 1000 metres at a meeting in Saint-Maur, France. Later that year, she qualified to compete in both the 800 m and 1500 m at the 1993 World Championships in Athletics. She finished 6th in her 800 m heat and 12th in her 1500 m round, failing to advance in both events.
