= Yvonne Mai-Graham =

Jamaican middle distance runner (born 1965)

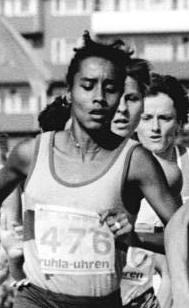
Mai competing in Neubrandenburg in 1989

Yvonne Graham (née Grabner, formerly Mai; born 22 August 1965) is a retired female middle distance runner who specialized in the 1500 metres. She represented East Germany and later Germany, before attaining Jamaican citizenship in 1993. She won a bronze medal at the 1989 IAAF World Indoor Championships.

== Career ==
Graham was born in Annaberg-Buchholz, Bezirk Karl-Marx-Stadt. Under her maiden name of Yvonne Grabner, she first came to prominence in 1983 competing for East Germany, winning a bronze medal at the 1983 European Junior Championships. Later, she married fellow East German athlete, Volker Mai. While competing as Yvonne Mai, she won a bronze medal at the 1989 World Indoor Championships. She competed for East Germany until 1990 and then a United Germany. In 1993 she married Jamaican 400 m hurdler Winthrop Graham and obtained Jamaican citizenship. She holds the Jamaican national records for 1500 metres, mile, and 3000 metres.

== Achievements ==
Year	Competition	Venue	Position	Notes
Representing East Germany
1983	European Junior Championships	Schwechat, Austria	3rd	1500 m
1989	European Indoor Championships	The Hague, Netherlands	4th	1500 m
1989	World Indoor Championships	Budapest, Hungary	3rd	1500 m
1989	World Cup	Barcelona, Spain	3rd	1500 m
1990	European Championships	Split, Yugoslavia	7th	1500 m
Representing Germany
1991	World Indoor Championships	Seville, Spain	6th	1500 m
1991	World Championships	Tokyo, Japan	13th	1500 m
Representing Jamaica
1995	World Championships	Gothenburg, Sweden	10th	1500 m

=== Personal bests ===
- 800 metres - 1:58.32 min (1990)
- 1500 metres - 4:01.84 min (1995)
- One mile - 4:22.97 min (1990)
- 3000 metres - 8:37.07 min (1995)
- 5000 metres - 15:07.91 min (1995)
