= Sarah Thorsett =

American middle-distance runner

Personal information
- Born: March 18, 1970 (age 56) Winona, Minnesota, United States

Sport
- Sport: Track and field
Medal record
Representing United States
Pan American Games
Gold medal – first place	1995 Mar del Plata	1500m

Sarah Thorsett (née Renk; born March 18, 1970) is a retired middle-distance runner from the United States, who competed in the 1990s for her alma mater, the University of Wisconsin, Madison, and for the United States. As a collegiate runner, she was a six-time All American, and a member of two national champion 4x800 meter relay teams. She was the winner of the women's 1500 meters race at the 1995 Pan American Games, and set her personal best time in that event (4:05.87) on 1996-07-10 at a meet in Nice, France. She twice competed as a member of her national team at World Championship events. She was inducted into the USA Track and Field Minnesota Hall of Fame in 2007.

Thorsett now resides in Salem, Georgia with her husband and four children.

== Achievements ==
Year	Competition	Venue	Position	Notes
Representing the United States
1994	US National Championships	Knoxville, Tennessee	4th	1500 m
1995	Pan American Games	Mar del Plata, Argentina	1st	1500 m
1995	US National Championships	Sacramento, California	3rd	1500 m
1996	US National Championships	Atlanta, Georgia	5th	1500 m
1997	US National Championships	Indianapolis, Indiana	3rd	1500 m
1998	US National Championships	New Orleans, Louisiana	8th	1500 m
