= Natalya Artyomova =

Russian middle-distance runner

Personal information
- Born: January 5, 1963 (age 63) Rostov-on-Don, Soviet Union

Sport
- Sport: Track and field
Medal record
Representing Soviet Union
Summer Universiade
Bronze medal – third place	1987 Zagreb	3000m

Natalya Petrovna Artyomova (Russian: Наталья Петровна Артёмова; born January 5, 1963) is a retired middle-distance runner from Russia, who was one of the leading athletes in the women's 1500 metres and 3000 metres during the 1980s.

On July 4, 1992, traces of a banned steroid were allegedly found in her urine sample. She was banned by track's world governing body IAAF pending a hearing.

== International competitions ==
Year	Competition	Venue	Position	Event	Notes
Representing Soviet Union
1983	World Championships	Helsinki, Finland	8th	3000 m	8:47.98
1988	Olympic Games	Seoul, South Korea	5th	3000 m	8:31.67
1990	Goodwill Games	Seattle, United States	1st	1500 m	4:09.48
1990	European Championships	Split, Yugoslavia	9th	1500 m	4:12.16
