= Maria Akraka =

Swedish middle-distance runner

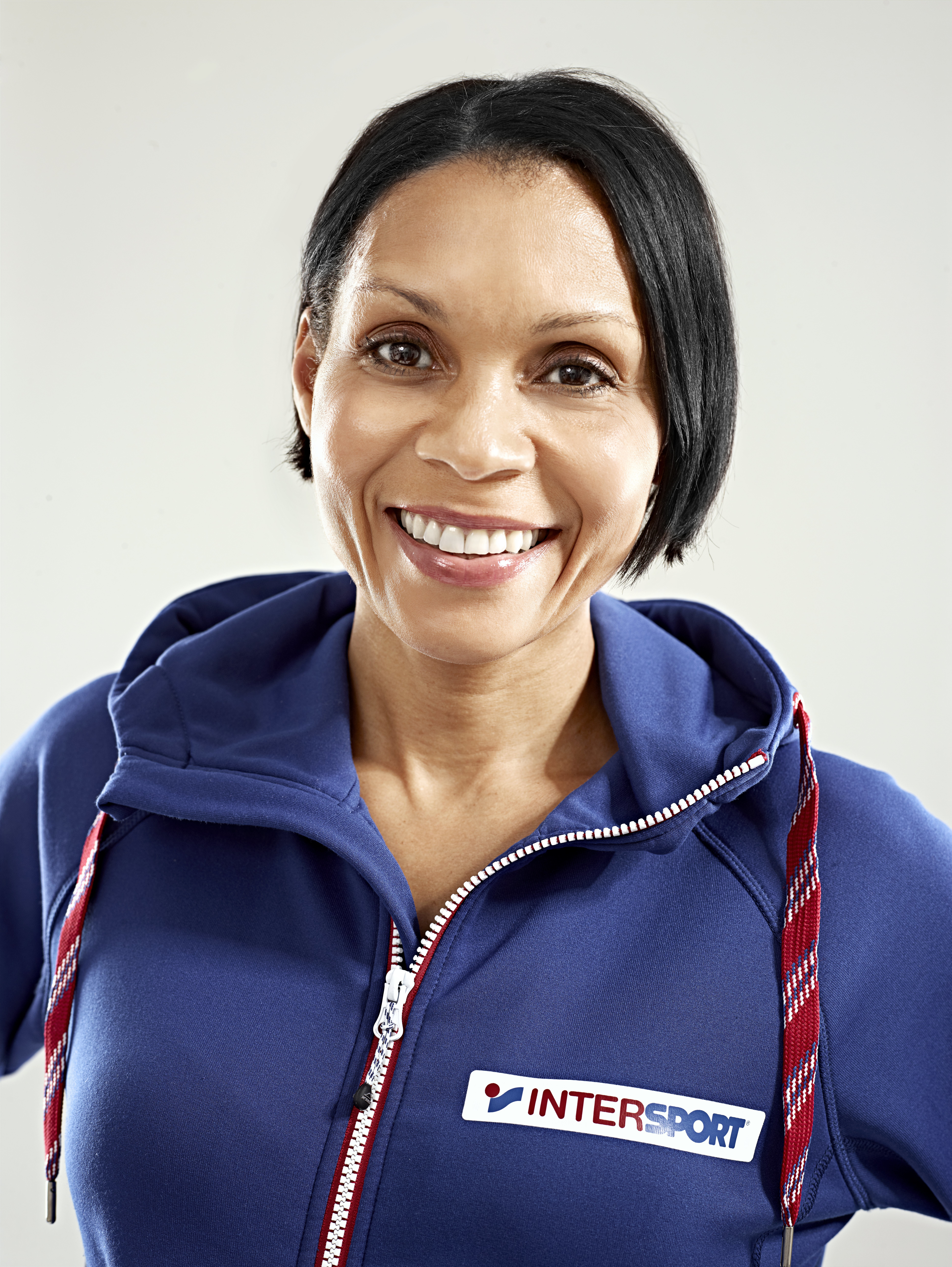
- Maria Akraka representing Intersport

Personal information
- Full name: Maria Helene Henriksson Akraka
- Born: 7 July 1966 (age 59) London, England
- Height: 1.70 m (5 ft 7 in)
- Weight: 55 kg (121 lb)

Sport
- Country: Sweden
- Sport: Athletics
- College team: Iowa State
- Club: Rånäs 4H
- Retired: 2000
Medal record
Women's athletics
Representing Sweden
Swedish Championships
Gold medal – first place	1987	800 m
Gold medal – first place	1987	4 x 800 m
Gold medal – first place	1988	800 m
Gold medal – first place	1988	4 x 800 m
Gold medal – first place	1989	800 m
Gold medal – first place	1989	4 x 800 m
Gold medal – first place	1990	800 m
Silver medal – second place	1990	4 x 800 m
Gold medal – first place	1991	800 m
Silver medal – second place	1991	4 x 800 m
Gold medal – first place	1992	3,000 m
Gold medal – first place	1993	800 m
Gold medal – first place	1993	1,500 m
Gold medal – first place	1993	3,000 m
Gold medal – first place	1994	800 m
Gold medal – first place	1994	1,500 m
Silver medal – second place	1995	800 m
Gold medal – first place	1995	1,500 m
Silver medal – second place	1995	4 x 800 m
Gold medal – first place	1998	4 x 800 m

Maria Helene Henriksson Akraka (born July 7, 1966) is a Swedish retired entrepreneur, television host and former athlete.

== College career ==
Akraka competed as an athlete in both cross country and track & field for Iowa State in the United States. She finished her career a four-time All-American and a two-time Big Eight champion. She also competed for the UC Irvine Anteaters track and field team.

In 2010 she was inducted into the Iowa State Cyclones Hall of Fame.

== International career ==
Akraka competed in four European Championships, three World Championships, and the 1992 Olympic Games in both the 1,500 m and 800 m races.

== Post-athletics career ==
Akraka worked previously as a host of betting company ATG's channel, Channel 75, where she interviewed Horse racing jockeys. She also worked for TV4 covering horse racing. In 2006, she started working for SVT, hosting extreme sports game show Megadrom and also covered various sports competitions such as the Olympics and DN Galan.

In 2009, she and her husband bought an estate with an equestrian training stable in 2009. She now spends much of her time training race horses.

Currently she serves as an advisory for sporting goods retailer, Intersport and the founder/CEO of Sportcore, a career agency for former professional athletes.

== Personal bests ==
Surface	Event	Time	Date	Place
Outdoor	400 m	54:50	20 August 1988	Malmö, Sweden
Outdoor	800 m	2:00:58	8 August 1991	Lahti, Finland
Outdoor	1,000 m	2:38:30	25 July 1995	Monaco
Outdoor	1,500 m	4:08:63	19 August 1994	Brussels, Belgium
Outdoor	1 mile	4:32:04	10 September 1993	London, England
Outdoor	2,000 m	5:47:76	4 September 1994	Sheffield, England
Outdoor	3,000 m	9:04:35	28 August 1994	Stockholm, Sweden
Indoor	800 m	2:00:01^{NR}	19 February 1998	Stockholm, Sweden
Indoor	1,500 m	4:07:74	18 February 1992	Genoa, Italy
Road	1 mile	4:29.0h	1 February 1998	Santee, CA, USA

== Personal life ==
Akraka is married to former triple jumper Tord Henriksson and they have two children.

Akraka was born in London to a Swedish mother and a Nigerian father. The family moved to Sweden but her parents separated and her father moved back to Nigeria. She was raised by her mother in Rågsved outside Stockholm. Her father Smart Akraka is a former track and field athlete who competed in the 1960 Olympic Games in Rome. She has a twin brother, Michael.
