= Lyudmila Rogachova =

Russian middle-distance runner

Personal information
- Born: 30 October 1966 (age 59) Stavropol Krai, Soviet Union

Sport
- Sport: Track and field
Medal record
Representing the Unified Team
Olympic Games
Silver medal – second place	1992 Barcelona	1500 m
Representing Soviet Union
World Championships
Bronze medal – third place	1991 Tokyo	1500 m
World Indoor Championships
Gold medal – first place	1991 Seville	1500 m
Summer Universiade
Bronze medal – third place	1989 Duisburg	1500 m
Representing Russia
European Championships
Gold medal – first place	1994 Helsinki	1500 m
Bronze medal – third place	1994 Helsinki	800 m

Lyudmila Vasiliyevna Rogachova (Russian: Людмила Васильевна Рогачёва; born 30 October 1966) is a retired Russian middle-distance runner who competed mainly in the 1500 metres. She became a World Indoor and European champion in this event, and won an Olympic silver medal in 1992 with a personal best time of 3:56.91 - beating future world record holder Qu Yunxia into bronze. Her 800 metres PB was 1:56.82.

== International competitions ==
Year	Competition	Venue	Position	Event	Notes
Representing the Soviet Union
1989	Universiade	Duisburg, West Germany	3rd	1500 m	4:15.11
1990	European Championships	Split, Yugoslavia	4th	1500 m	4:10.06
1991	World Indoor Championships	Seville, Spain	1st	1500 m	4:05.09
1991	World Championships	Tokyo, Japan	3rd	1500 m	4:02.72
Representing Unified Team
1992	Olympic Games	Barcelona, Spain	2nd	1500 m	3:56.91 PB
Representing Russia
1994	European Indoor Championships	Paris, France	2nd	1500 m	4:06.60
1994	European Championships	Helsinki, Finland	3rd	800 m	1:58.69
1994	European Championships	Helsinki, Finland	1st	1500 m	4:18.93
