= Violeta Szekely =

Romanian middle-distance runner

Personal information
- Born: 26 March 1965 (age 61) Dolheștii Mari, Romania

Sport
- Sport: Track and field
Medal record
Representing Romania
Olympic Games
| Silver medal – second place | 2000 Sydney | 1500 m |
World Championships
| Silver medal – second place | 2001 Edmonton | 1500 m |
World Indoor Championships
| Silver medal – second place | 1991 Seville | 800 m |
| Silver medal – second place | 1993 Toronto | 800 m |
| Silver medal – second place | 1999 Maebashi | 1500 m |
| Silver medal – second place | 2001 Lisbon | 1500 m |

Violeta Szekely, (née Beclea, born 26 March 1965) is a Romanian former middle distance runner who competed mainly in the 1500 metres. She competed in two Olympic Games, in 1992 and 2000.

She was favored to win the 2000 Summer Olympics 1500 metres after a stellar season, but getting boxed in around the final curb would cost her the gold medal. She only got out about 80 metres from the end and while she made up considerable ground was unable to catch the ground lost while trapped inside to surprise winner Nouria Merah-Benida. She was also favored to win the 2001 World 1500 metre title after dominating the Golden League series, but was beaten out by bitter rival and teammate Gabriela Szabo. She did however win a share of the golden league jackspot, by winning all of her Golden league 1500 metre races this season.

Szekely retired after the 2002 season.

== Doping ==
Beclea tested positive for steroids in February 1995 and was subsequently handed a four-year ban from sports. She also lost the fourth place from the 1500 m at the 1995 IAAF World Indoor Championships.

== Personal bests ==
- 800 Metres – 1:58.57 (1998)
- 1000 Metres – 2:36.74 (1989)
- 1500 Metres – 3:58.29 (2000)
- One Mile – 4:21.69 (1993)
- 2000 Metres – 5:48.8 (1998)
- 3000 Metres – 8:47.3 (1998)

== Major achievements ==
| Year | Competition | Venue | Position | Event | Notes |
Representing Romania
| 1986 | European Championships | Stuttgart, West Germany | 16th (sf) | 800m | 2:08.25 |
| 1990 | European Championships | Split, Yugoslavia | 12th | 1500m | 4:16.45 |
| 1991 | World Indoor Championships | Seville, Spain | 2nd | 800m | 2:01.75 |
| 1993 | World Indoor Championships | Toronto, Canada | 2nd | 1500m | 4:09.41 |
| 1994 | European Championships | Helsinki, Finland | 24th (h) | 1500m | 4:20.43 |
| 1999 | World Indoor Championships | Maebashi, Japan | 2nd | 1500m | 4:03.53 |
| 1999 | IAAF Grand Prix Final | Munich, Germany | 1st | 1500m | 4:15.18 |
| 2000 | Summer Olympics | Sydney, Australia | 2nd | 1500m | 4:05.15 |
| 2000 | IAAF Grand Prix Final | Doha, United Arab Emirates | 1st | 1500m | 4:15.63 |
| 2001 | World Indoor Championships | Lisbon, Portugal | 2nd | 1500m | 4:11.17 |
| 2001 | World Championships | Edmonton, Canada | 2nd | 1500m | 4:01.70 |

Other achievements:

- Tenth place in the 1500 m at the 1991 IAAF World Championships
- Fourth place in 800 m at the 1989 World Indoor Championships
- Fifth place in 3000 m at the 1999 World Indoor Championships
- Fourth place in 1500 m at the 1999 World Championships
