= 1500 metres =

Middle distance running event

Athletics 1500 metres
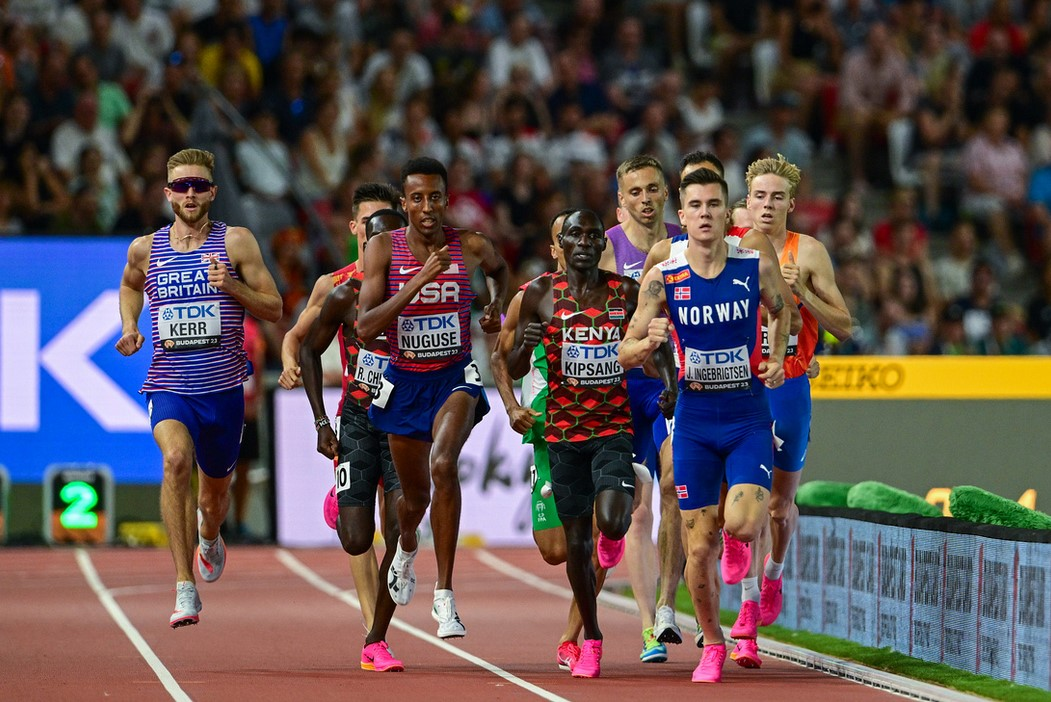
- Men's 1500 m final at the 2023 World Championships in Budapest. Jakob Ingebrigtsen leads with Josh Kerr to the far left and Yared Nuguse in center frame.

World records
- Men: Hicham El Guerrouj (MAR) 3:26.00 (1998)
- Women: Faith Kipyegon (KEN) 3:48.68 (2025)

Short track world records
- Men: Jakob Ingebrigtsen (NOR) 3:29.63+ (2025)
- Women: Gudaf Tsegay (ETH) 3:53.09 (2021)

Olympic records
- Men: Cole Hocker (USA) 3:27.65 (2024)
- Women: Faith Kipyegon (KEN) 3:51.29 (2024)

World Championship records
- Men: Hicham El Guerrouj (MAR) 3:27.65 (1999)
- Women: Sifan Hassan (NED) 3:51.95 (2019)

World junior (U20) records
- Men: Phanuel Koech (KEN) 3:27.72 (2025)
- Women: Lang Yinglai (CHN) 3:51.34 (1997)

The 1500 metres or 1500-metre run is the foremost middle-distance track event in athletics. The distance has been contested at the Summer Olympics since 1896 and the World Championships in Athletics since 1983. It is equivalent to 1.5 kilometres or approximately 15/16 miles. The event is closely associated with its slightly longer variant, the mile run, from which it derives its nickname "the metric mile".

The demands of the race are similar to that of the 800 metre run, but with a slightly higher emphasis on aerobic endurance and a slightly lower sprint speed requirement. The 1500-metre run is predominantly aerobic, but anaerobic conditioning is also required.

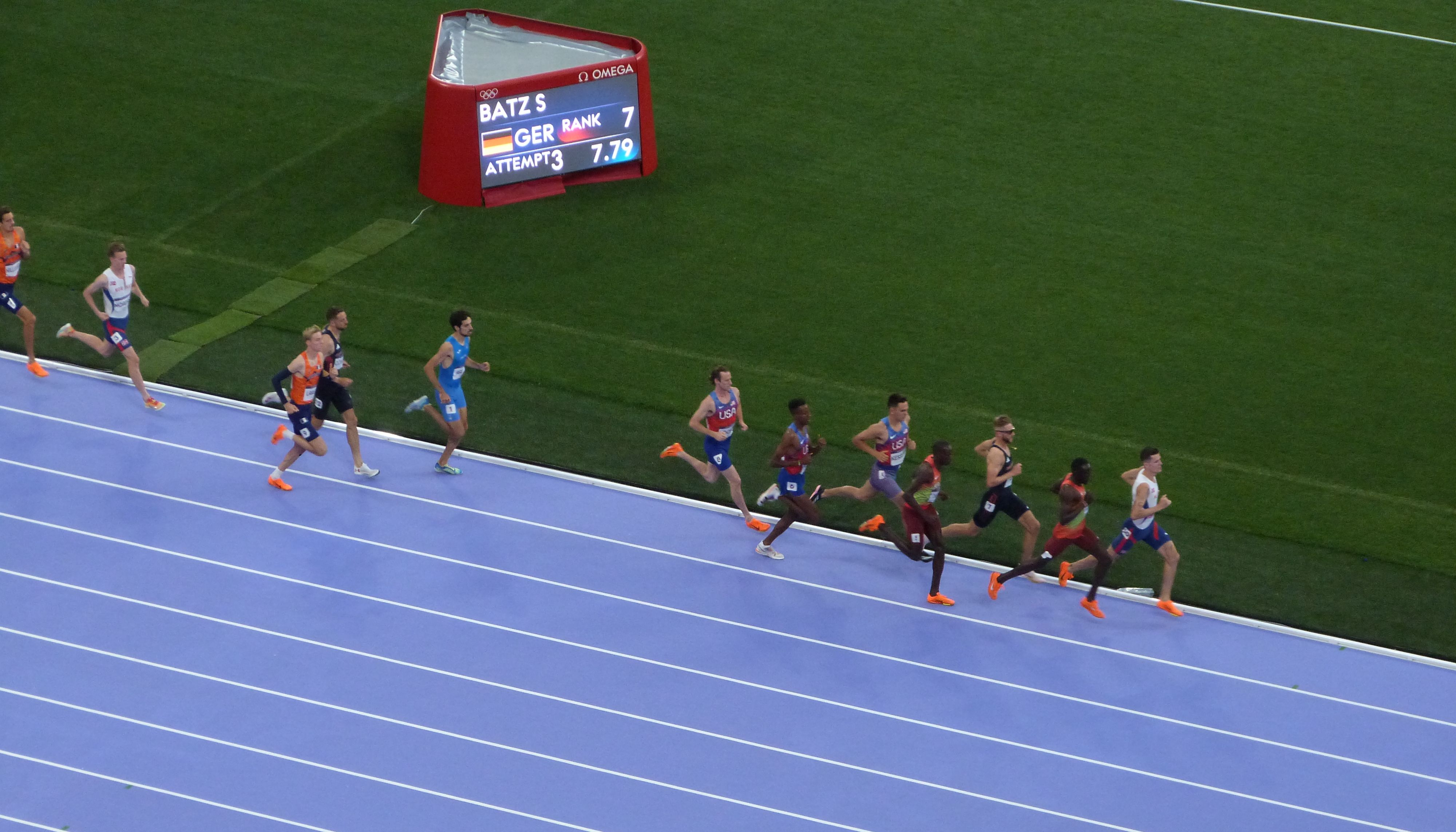
Athletes competing in the 2024 men's Olympic final

Each lap run during the men's world-record race of 3:26.00, run by Hicham El Guerrouj of Morocco in 1998, averaged just under 55 seconds per lap. Since El Guerrouj, only three other men in history have broken the 3:27 barrier; Bernard Lagat, Asbel Kiprop, and Jakob Ingebrigtsen. El Guerrouj remains the only man to break the 3:27 barrier more than once, having done so five times.

1500 metres is three and three-quarter laps around a 400-metre track (or seven and a half laps around an indoor 200 m track). During the 1970s and 1980s this race was dominated by British runners, along with an occasional Finn, American, or New Zealander. Through the 1990s, many African runners began to win Olympic medals in this race, especially runners from Kenya, Ethiopia, and East Africa, as well as North African runners from Morocco and Algeria. In the mid-2010s and 2020s, European and American runners began to emerge again in the men's event. American Matthew Centrowitz Jr. won at the 2016 Summer Olympics. In the 2020 Summer Olympics, Jakob Ingebrigtsen, the youngest of a dynasty of Norwegian middle-distance runners, became Olympic champion, while Scottish and British runner Jake Wightman became world champions the following year at the head of an all-European podium. Wightman's compatriot Josh Kerr won at the world championships the year after. In the 2024 Summer Olympics, Americans and Europeans continued to dominate the podium, with Cole Hocker, Kerr, and Yared Nuguse earning gold, silver, and bronze respectively. Faith Kipyegon of Kenya maintained Africa's grip on the global titles in the female event in the same time period, although here again, Europeans Sifan Hassan and Laura Muir, and Americans such as Jenny Simpson also contended for the podium, along with Australian Jessica Hull.

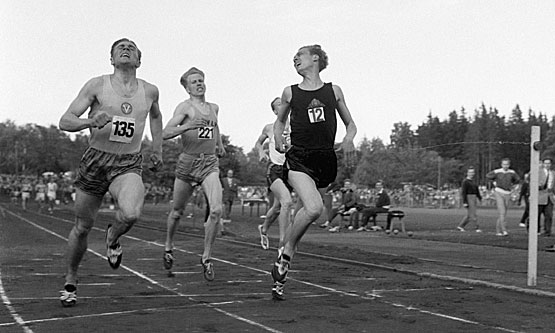
Olavi Salsola, Olavi Salonen and Olavi Vuorisalo (The three Olavis) break the 1500 m world record in 1957 in Turku, Finland.

In the Modern Olympic Games, the men's 1500-metre run has been contested since the 1896 Games. The first winner, in 1896, was Edwin Flack of Australia, who also became Olympic champion in the 800-metre race. The women's 1500-metre race was first added to the Summer Olympics in 1972, and the first champion was Lyudmila Bragina of the Soviet Union. During the Olympic Games of 1972 through 2008, the women's 1500-metre race has been won by three Soviets plus one Russian, one Italian, one Romanian, one Briton, one Kenyan, and two Algerians. The 2012 Olympic results are still undecided as a result of multiple doping cases. The best women's times for the race were controversially set by Chinese runners, all set in the same race on just two dates four years apart at the Chinese National Games. At least one of those top Chinese athletes has admitted to being part of a doping program. This women's record was finally broken by Genzebe Dibaba of Ethiopia in 2015.

In American high schools, the 1600-metre run, also colloquially referred to as "metric mile", is the designated official distance by the National Governing Body the NFHS. Because of the legacy, since US customary units are better-known in America, the mile run (which is 1609.344 metres in length) is more frequently run than the 1500-metre run. For convenience, national rankings are standardized by converting all 1500-metre run times to their mile run equivalents.

== Strategy ==
Many 1500 metres events, particularly at the championship level, turn into slow, strategic races, with the pace quickening and competitors jockeying for position in the final lap to settle the race in a final sprint. Such is the difficulty of maintaining the pace throughout the duration of the event, most records are set in planned races led by pacemakers or "rabbits" who sacrifice their opportunity to win by leading the early laps at a fast pace before dropping out.

The person who wins the race is behind watching.

— Filbert Bayi, former world record holder

== Area records ==
- Updated 9 July 2026.

Area	Men			Women		
Area	Time	Season	Athlete	Time	Season	Athlete
World	3:26.00	1998	Hicham El Guerrouj (MAR)	3:48.68	2025	Faith Kipyegon (KEN)
Area records
Africa (records)	3:26.00	1998	Hicham El Guerrouj (MAR)	3:48.68	2025	Faith Kipyegon (KEN)
Asia (records)	3:29.14	2006	Rashid Ramzi (BHR)	3:50.46	1993	Qu Yunxia (CHN)
Europe (records)	3:26.73	2024	Jakob Ingebrigtsen (NOR)	3:51.95	2019	Sifan Hassan (NED)
North, Central America and Caribbean (records)	3:27.65	2024	Cole Hocker (USA)	3:54.99	2019	Shelby Houlihan (USA)
Oceania (records)	3:28.00	2026	Cameron Myers (AUS)	3:50.83	2024	Jessica Hull (AUS)
South America (records)	3:33.25	2005	Hudson de Souza (BRA)	4:05.50	2026	Micaela Levaggi (ARG)

== All-time top 25 ==
Tables show data for two definitions of "Top 25" – the top 25 1500 m times and the top 25 athletes:
– denotes top performance for athletes in the top 25 1500 m times
– denotes lesser performances, still in the top 25 1500 m times, by repeat athletes
– denotes top performance (only) for other top 25 athletes who fall outside the top 25 1500 m times

=== Men (outdoor) ===
- Updated 18 July 2026.

Ath.#	Perf.#	Time	Athlete	Nation	Date	Place	Ref.
1	1	3:26.00	Hicham El Guerrouj	Morocco	14 July 1998	Rome	
	2	3:26.12	El Guerrouj #2		24 August 2001	Brussels	
2	3	3:26.34	Bernard Lagat	Kenya	24 August 2001	Brussels	
	4	3:26.45	El Guerrouj #3		12 August 1998	Zürich	
3	5	3:26.69	Asbel Kiprop	Kenya	17 July 2015	Monaco	
4	6	3:26.73	Jakob Ingebrigtsen	Norway	12 July 2024	Monaco	
	7	3:26.89	El Guerrouj #4		16 August 2002	Zürich	
	8	3:26.96	El Guerrouj #5		8 September 2002	Rieti	
	9	3:27.14	Ingebrigtsen #2		16 July 2023	Chorzów	
	10	3:27.21	El Guerrouj #6		11 August 2000	Zürich	
	11	3:27.34	El Guerrouj #7		19 July 2002	Monaco	
5	12	3:27.37	Noureddine Morceli	Algeria	12 July 1995	Nice	
	13	3:27.40	Lagat #2		6 August 2004	Zürich	
6	14	3:27.49	Azeddine Habz	France	20 June 2025	Paris	
	15	3:27.52	Morceli #2		25 July 1995	Monaco	
7	16	3:27.62+	Josh Kerr	Great Britain	18 July 2026	London	
	17	3:27.64	El Guerrouj #8		6 August 2004	Zürich	
8	17	3:27.64	Silas Kiplagat	Kenya	18 July 2014	Monaco	
	19	3:27.65	El Guerrouj #9		24 August 1999	Seville	
9	19	3:27.65	Cole Hocker	United States	6 August 2024	Saint-Denis	
	21	3:27.72	Kiprop #2		19 July 2013	Monaco	
10	21	3:27.72	Phanuel Koech	Kenya	20 June 2025	Paris	
	23	3:27.79	Kerr #2		6 August 2024	Saint-Denis	
11	24	3:27.80	Yared Nuguse	United States	6 August 2024	Saint-Denis	
	25	3:27.83	Ingebrigtsen #3		22 August 2024	Lausanne	
12		3:28.00	Cameron Myers	Australia	28 June 2026	Paris	
13		3:28.12	Noah Ngeny	Kenya	11 August 2000	Zürich	
14		3:28.28	Timothy Cheruiyot	Kenya	9 July 2021	Monaco	
15		3:28.36	George Mills	Great Britain	20 June 2025	Paris	
16		3:28.75	Taoufik Makhloufi	Algeria	17 July 2015	Monaco	
17		3:28.76	Mohamed Katir	Spain	9 July 2021	Monaco	
18		3:28.79	Abdalaati Iguider	Morocco	17 July 2015	Monaco	
19		3:28.80	Elijah Manangoi	Kenya	21 July 2017	Monaco	
19		3:28.80	Brian Komen	Kenya	12 July 2024	Monaco	
21		3:28.81	Mo Farah	Great Britain	19 July 2013	Monaco	
21		3:28.81	Ronald Kwemoi	Kenya	18 July 2014	Monaco	
23		3:28.95	Fermín Cacho	Spain	13 August 1997	Zürich	
24		3:28.98	Mehdi Baala	France	5 September 2003	Brussels	
25		3:29.02	Daniel Kipchirchir Komen	Kenya	14 July 2006	Rome	

=== Women (outdoor) ===
- Updated September 2026.

Ath.#	Perf.#	Time	Athlete	Nation	Date	Place	Ref.
1	1	3:48.68	Faith Kipyegon	Kenya	5 July 2025	Eugene	
	2	3:49.04	Kipyegon #2		7 July 2024	Paris	
	3	3:49.11	Kipyegon #3		2 June 2023	Florence	
2	4	3:50.07	Genzebe Dibaba	Ethiopia	17 July 2015	Monaco	
3	5	3:50.30	Gudaf Tsegay	Ethiopia	20 April 2024	Xiamen	
	6	3:50.37	Kipyegon #4		10 August 2022	Monaco	
4	7	3:50.46	Qu Yunxia	China	11 September 1993	Beijing	
	8	3:50.62	Tsegay #2		16 August 2025	Chorzów	
	9	3:50.72	Kipyegon #5		16 September 2023	Eugene	
5	10	3:50.83	Jessica Hull	Australia	7 July 2024	Paris	
6	11	3:50.98	Jiang Bo	China	18 October 1997	Shanghai	
	12	3:51.07	Kipyegon #6		9 July 2021	Monaco	
	13	3:51.29	Kipyegon #7		10 August 2024	Saint-Denis	
7	14	3:51.34	Lang Yinglai	China	18 October 1997	Shanghai	
	15	3:51.41+	Kipyegon #8		21 July 2023	Monaco	
8	16	3:51.44	Diribe Welteji	Ethiopia	5 July 2025	Eugene	
9	17	3:51.92	Wang Junxia	China	11 September 1993	Beijing	
10	18	3:51.95	Sifan Hassan	Netherlands	5 October 2019	Doha	
	19	3:52.15	Kipyegon #9		16 September 2025	Tokyo	
11	20	3:52.47	Tatyana Kazankina	Soviet Union	13 August 1980	Zürich	
	21	3:52.56	Hull #2		10 August 2024	Saint-Denis	
	22	3:52.59	Kipyegon #10		28 May 2022	Eugene	
12	23	3:52.61	Georgia Bell	Great Britain	10 August 2024	Saint-Denis	
	24	3:52.67	Hull #3		5 July 2025	Eugene	
	25	3:52.75	Welteji #2		10 August 2024	Saint-Denis	
13		3:53.22	Birke Haylom	Ethiopia	20 April 2024	Xiamen	
14		3:53.37	Laura Muir	Great Britain	10 August 2024	Saint-Denis	
15		3:53.91	Yin Lili	China	18 October 1997	Shanghai	
16		3:53.96	Paula Ivan	Romania	1 October 1988	Seoul	
17		3:53.97	Lan Lixin	China	18 October 1997	Shanghai	
18		3:54.05	Klaudia Kazimierska	Poland	5 September 2026	Brussels	
19		3:54.16	Freweyni Hailu	Ethiopia	30 August 2024	Rome	
20		3:54.23	Olga Dvirna	Soviet Union	27 July 1982	Kyiv	
21		3:54.52	Zhang Ling	China	18 October 1997	Shanghai	
22		3:54.72	Dorcus Ewoi	Kenya	5 September 2026	Brussels	
23		3:54.73	Beatrice Chebet	Kenya	16 August 2025	Chorzów	
24		3:54.87	Hirut Meshesha	Ethiopia	16 July 2023	Chorzów	
25		3:54.99	Shelby Houlihan	United States	5 October 2019	Doha	

=== Men (indoor) ===
- Updated 22 February 2026.

Ath.#	Perf.#	Time	Athlete	Nation	Date	Place	Ref.
1	1	3:29.63+	Jakob Ingebrigtsen	Norway	13 February 2025	Liévin	
	2	3:30.60	Ingebrigtsen #2		17 February 2022	Liévin	
2	3	3:30.80+	Cole Hocker	United States	14 February 2026	Winston-Salem	
3	4	3:31.04	Samuel Tefera	Ethiopia	16 February 2019	Birmingham	
4	5	3:31.18	Hicham El Guerrouj	Morocco	2 February 1997	Stuttgart	
5	6	3:31.25+	Yomif Kejelcha	Ethiopia	3 March 2019	Boston	
	7	3:31.58	Kejelcha #2		3 March 2019	Birmingham	
6	8	3:31.74+	Yared Nuguse	United States	8 February 2025	New York City	
7	9	3:31.76	Haile Gebrselassie	Ethiopia	1 February 1998	Stuttgart	
	10	3:31.80	Ingebrigtsen #3		9 February 2021	Liévin	
8	11	3:31.89+	Hobbs Kessler	United States	8 February 2025	New York City	
	12	3:32.01	El Guerrouj #2		22 February 1998	Liévin	
9	13	3:32.11	Laban Rotich	Kenya	1 February 1998	Stuttgart	
10	14	3:32.24+	Azeddine Habz	France	8 February 2025	New York City	
	15	3:32.29	Habz #2		13 February 2025	Liévin	
11	16	3:32.35	Olli Hoare	Australia	13 February 2021	New York City	
	17	3:32.38	Ingebrigtsen #4		15 February 2023	Liévin	
	18	3:32.39	Gebrselassie #2		2 February 1997	Stuttgart	
12	19	3:32.44	Isaac Nader	Portugal	19 February 2026	Liévin	
13	20	3:32.48	Neil Gourley	Great Britain	25 February 2023	Birmingham	
	21	3:32.56	Habz #3		22 February 2026	Toruń	
	23	3:32.59	Nader #2		13 February 2025	Liévin	
14	24	3:32.67+	Cam Myers	Australia	8 February 2025	New York City	
15	25	3:32.68	Samuel Chapple	Netherlands	22 February 2026	Toruń	
16		3:32.86+	Josh Kerr	Great Britain	27 February 2022	Boston	
17		3:32.97	Selemon Barega	Ethiopia	17 February 2021	Toruń	
18		3:33.04	Federico Riva	Italy	19 February 2026	Liévin	
19		3:33.08	Daniel Kipchirchir Komen	Kenya	13 February 2005	Karlsruhe	
20		3:33.09	Andrew Coscoran	Ireland	19 February 2026	Liévin	
21		3:33.10	Deresse Mekonnen	Ethiopia	20 February 2010	Birmingham	
22		3:33.14+	Robert Farken	Germany	8 February 2025	New York City	
23		3:33.17	Vénuste Niyongabo	Burundi	22 February 1998	Liévin	
24		3:33.23	Augustine Choge	Kenya	19 February 2011	Birmingham	
25		3:33.25+	Sam Ruthe	New Zealand	31 January 2026	Boston	

=== Women (indoor) ===
- Updated March 2026.

Ath.#	Perf.#	Time	Athlete	Nation	Date	Place	Ref.
1	1	3:53.09	Gudaf Tsegay	Ethiopia	9 February 2021	Liévin	
	2	3:53.92	Tsegay #2		16 February 2025	Toruń	
	3	3:54.77	Tsegay #3		22 February 2022	Toruń	
	4	3:54.86	Tsegay #4		23 March 2025	Nanjing	
2	5	3:55.17	Genzebe Dibaba	Ethiopia	1 February 2014	Karlsruhe	
3	6	3:55.28	Freweyni Hailu	Ethiopia	6 February 2024	Toruń	
4	7	3:55.47	Diribe Welteji	Ethiopia	6 February 2024	Toruń	
	8	3:56.46+	Dibaba #2		17 February 2016	Stockholm	
5	9	3:56.47	Hirut Meshesha	Ethiopia	6 February 2024	Toruń	
	10	3:57.19	Tsegay #5		19 March 2022	Belgrade	
	11	3:57.24	Hailu #2		10 February 2024	Liévin	
	12	3:57.38	Tsegay #6		2 March 2022	Madrid	
	13	3:57.45	Dibaba #3		3 February 2018	Karlsruhe	
	14	3:57.47	Tsegay #7		15 February 2023	Liévin	
	15	3:57.48	Welteji #2		10 February 2024	Liévin	
6	16	3:57.91	Abeba Aregawi	Sweden	6 February 2014	Stockholm	
	17	3:58.11	Tsegay #8		4 February 2024	Boston	
7	18	3:58.28	Yelena Soboleva	Russia	18 February 2006	Moscow	
	19	3:58.40	Aregawi #2		21 February 2013	Stockholm	
8	20	3:58.43	Birke Haylom	Ethiopia	4 February 2024	Boston	
9	21	3:58.53	Georgia Hunter Bell	Great Britain	22 March 2026	Toruń	
10	22	3:58.79	Tigist Girma	Ethiopia	6 February 2024	Toruń	
	23	3:58.80	Dibaba #4		10 February 2017	Toruń	
	24	3:58.89	Welteji #3		13 February 2025	Liévin	
	25	3:59.08	Dibaba #5		6 February 2019	Sabadell	
11		3:59.33+	Elle St. Pierre	United States	14 February 2026	Boston	
12		3:59.45	Jessica Hull	Australia	22 March 2026	Toruń	
13		3:59.58	Laura Muir	Great Britain	9 February 2021	Liévin	
14		3:59.60+	Heather MacLean	United States	2 March 2025	Boston	
15		3:59.68	Nikki Hiltz	United States	22 March 2026	Toruń	
16		3:59.71	Agathe Guillemot	France	22 March 2026	Toruń	
17		3:59.75	Gelete Burka	Ethiopia	9 March 2008	Valencia	
18		3:59.79	Maryam Yusuf Jamal	Bahrain	9 March 2008	Valencia	
19		3:59.87+	Konstanze Klosterhalfen	Germany	8 February 2020	New York City	
20		3:59.98	Regina Jacobs	United States	1 February 2003	Boston	
21		4:00.27+	Doina Melinte	Romania	9 February 1990	East Rutherford	
22		4:00.28	Dawit Seyaum	Ethiopia	28 February 2016	Boston	
23		4:00.46	Sifan Hassan	Netherlands	19 February 2015	Stockholm	
24		4:00.52+	Jemma Reekie	Great Britain	8 February 2020	New York City	
25		4:00.72	Natalya Gorelova	Russia	27 February 2003	Moscow	

== U20 records and U18 world bests ==
- Updated 20 June 2025.

Age group	Men			Women		
Age group	Time	Athlete	Nation	Time	Athlete	Nation
U20 (records)	3:27.72	Phanuel Koech	Kenya	3:51.34	Lang Yinglai	China
U18 (world bests)	3:33.26	Cameron Myers	Australia	3:54.52	Zhang Ling	China

== Olympic medalists ==
=== Men ===
Games	Gold	Silver	Bronze
1896 Athens	Edwin Flack; Australia	Arthur Blake; United States	Albin Lermusiaux; France
1900 Paris	Charles Bennett; Great Britain	Henri Deloge; France	John Bray; United States
1904 St. Louis	Jim Lightbody; United States	Frank Verner; United States	Lacey Hearn; United States
1908 London	Mel Sheppard; United States	Harold Wilson; Great Britain	Norman Hallows; Great Britain
1912 Stockholm	Arnold Jackson; Great Britain	Abel Kiviat; United States	Norman Taber; United States
1920 Antwerp	Albert Hill; Great Britain	Philip Baker; Great Britain	Lawrence Shields; United States
1924 Paris	Paavo Nurmi; Finland	Willy Schärer; Switzerland	H. B. Stallard; Great Britain
1928 Amsterdam	Harri Larva; Finland	Jules Ladoumègue; France	Eino Purje; Finland
1932 Los Angeles	Luigi Beccali; Italy	Jerry Cornes; Great Britain	Phil Edwards; Canada
1936 Berlin	Jack Lovelock; New Zealand	Glenn Cunningham; United States	Luigi Beccali; Italy
1948 London	Henry Eriksson; Sweden	Lennart Strand; Sweden	Willem Slijkhuis; Netherlands
1952 Helsinki	Josy Barthel; Luxembourg	Bob McMillen; United States	Werner Lueg; Germany
1956 Melbourne	Ron Delany; Ireland	Klaus Richtzenhain; United Team of Germany	John Landy; Australia
1960 Rome	Herb Elliott; Australia	Michel Jazy; France	István Rózsavölgyi; Hungary
1964 Tokyo	Peter Snell; New Zealand	Josef Odložil; Czechoslovakia	John Davies; New Zealand
1968 Mexico City	Kipchoge Keino; Kenya	Jim Ryun; United States	Bodo Tümmler; West Germany
1972 Munich	Pekka Vasala; Finland	Kipchoge Keino; Kenya	Rod Dixon; New Zealand
1976 Montreal	John Walker; New Zealand	Ivo Van Damme; Belgium	Paul-Heinz Wellmann; West Germany
1980 Moscow	Sebastian Coe; Great Britain	Jürgen Straub; East Germany	Steve Ovett; Great Britain
1984 Los Angeles	Sebastian Coe; Great Britain	Steve Cram; Great Britain	José Manuel Abascal; Spain
1988 Seoul	Peter Rono; Kenya	Peter Elliott; Great Britain	Jens-Peter Herold; East Germany
1992 Barcelona	Fermín Cacho; Spain	Rachid El Basir; Morocco	Mohamed Suleiman; Qatar
1996 Atlanta	Noureddine Morceli; Algeria	Fermín Cacho; Spain	Stephen Kipkorir; Kenya
2000 Sydney	Noah Ngeny; Kenya	Hicham El Guerrouj; Morocco	Bernard Lagat; Kenya
2004 Athens	Hicham El Guerrouj; Morocco	Bernard Lagat; Kenya	Rui Silva; Portugal
2008 Beijing	Asbel Kiprop; Kenya	Nick Willis; New Zealand	Mehdi Baala; France
2012 London	Taoufik Makhloufi; Algeria	Leonel Manzano; United States	Abdalaati Iguider; Morocco
2016 Rio de Janeiro	Matthew Centrowitz Jr. United States	Taoufik Makhloufi; Algeria	Nick Willis; New Zealand
2020 Tokyo	Jakob Ingebrigtsen; Norway	Timothy Cheruiyot; Kenya	Josh Kerr; Great Britain
2024 Paris	Cole Hocker; United States	Josh Kerr; Great Britain	Yared Nuguse; United States
2028 Los Angeles			

=== Women ===
Games	Gold	Silver	Bronze
1972 Munich	Lyudmila Bragina; Soviet Union	Gunhild Hoffmeister; East Germany	Paola Pigni; Italy
1976 Montreal	Tatyana Kazankina; Soviet Union	Gunhild Hoffmeister; East Germany	Ulrike Klapezynski; East Germany
1980 Moscow	Tatyana Kazankina; Soviet Union	Christiane Wartenberg; East Germany	Nadezhda Olizarenko; Soviet Union
1984 Los Angeles	Gabriella Dorio; Italy	Doina Melinte; Romania	Maricica Puică; Romania
1988 Seoul	Paula Ivan; Romania	Laimutė Baikauskaitė; Soviet Union	Tetyana Samolenko; Soviet Union
1992 Barcelona	Hassiba Boulmerka; Algeria	Lyudmila Rogachova; Unified Team	Qu Yunxia; China
1996 Atlanta	Svetlana Masterkova; Russia	Gabriela Szabo; Romania	Theresia Kiesl; Austria
2000 Sydney	Nouria Mérah-Benida; Algeria	Violeta Szekely; Romania	Gabriela Szabo; Romania
2004 Athens	Kelly Holmes; Great Britain	Tatyana Tomashova; Russia	Maria Cioncan; Romania
2008 Beijing	Nancy Langat; Kenya	Iryna Lishchynska; Ukraine	Nataliya Tobias; Ukraine
2012 London	Maryam Yusuf Jamal; Bahrain	Abeba Aregawi; Ethiopia	Shannon Rowbury; United States
2016 Rio de Janeiro	Faith Kipyegon; Kenya	Genzebe Dibaba; Ethiopia	Jennifer Simpson; United States
2020 Tokyo	Faith Kipyegon; Kenya	Laura Muir; Great Britain	Sifan Hassan; Netherlands
2024 Paris	Faith Kipyegon; Kenya	Jessica Hull; Australia	Georgia Bell; Great Britain
2028 Los Angeles			

== World Championships medalists ==
=== Men ===
Championships	Gold	Silver	Bronze
1983 Helsinki	Steve Cram (GBR)	Steve Scott (USA)	Saïd Aouita (MAR)
1987 Rome	Abdi Bile (SOM)	José Luis González (ESP)	Jim Spivey (USA)
1991 Tokyo	Noureddine Morceli (ALG)	Wilfred Kirochi (KEN)	Hauke Fuhlbrügge (GER)
1993 Stuttgart	Noureddine Morceli (ALG)	Fermín Cacho (ESP)	Abdi Bile (SOM)
1995 Gothenburg	Noureddine Morceli (ALG)	Hicham El Guerrouj (MAR)	Vénuste Niyongabo (BDI)
1997 Athens	Hicham El Guerrouj (MAR)	Fermín Cacho (ESP)	Reyes Estévez (ESP)
1999 Seville	Hicham El Guerrouj (MAR)	Noah Ngeny (KEN)	Reyes Estévez (ESP)
2001 Edmonton	Hicham El Guerrouj (MAR)	Bernard Lagat (KEN)	Driss Maazouzi (FRA)
2003 Saint-Denis	Hicham El Guerrouj (MAR)	Mehdi Baala (FRA)	Ivan Heshko (UKR)
2005 Helsinki	Rashid Ramzi (BHR)	Adil Kaouch (MAR)	Rui Silva (POR)
2007 Osaka	Bernard Lagat (USA)	Rashid Ramzi (BHR)	Shedrack Kibet Korir (KEN)
2009 Berlin	Yusuf Saad Kamel (BHR)	Deresse Mekonnen (ETH)	Bernard Lagat (USA)
2011 Daegu	Asbel Kiprop (KEN)	Silas Kiplagat (KEN)	Matthew Centrowitz (USA)
2013 Moscow	Asbel Kiprop (KEN)	Matthew Centrowitz (USA)	Johan Cronje (RSA)
2015 Beijing	Asbel Kiprop (KEN)	Elijah Manangoi (KEN)	Abdalaati Iguider (MAR)
2017 London	Elijah Manangoi (KEN)	Timothy Cheruiyot (KEN)	Filip Ingebrigtsen (NOR)
2019 Doha	Timothy Cheruiyot (KEN)	Taoufik Makhloufi (ALG)	Marcin Lewandowski (POL)
2022 Eugene	Jake Wightman (GBR)	Jakob Ingebrigtsen (NOR)	Mohamed Katir (ESP)
2023 Budapest	Josh Kerr (GBR)	Jakob Ingebrigtsen (NOR)	Narve Gilje Nordås (NOR)
2025 Tokyo	Isaac Nader (POR)	Jake Wightman (GBR)	Reynold Cheruiyot (KEN)

==== Medalists by country ====
Rank	Nation	Gold	Silver	Bronze	Total
1	Kenya (KEN)	5	6	2	13
2	Morocco (MAR)	4	2	2	8
3	Algeria (ALG)	3	1	0	4
3	Great Britain (GBR)	3	1	0	4
5	Bahrain (BHR)	2	1	0	3
6	United States (USA)	1	2	3	6
7	Somalia (SOM)	1	0	1	2
7	Portugal (POR)	1	0	1	2
9	Spain (ESP)	0	3	3	6
10	Norway (NOR)	0	2	2	4
11	France (FRA)	0	1	1	2
12	Ethiopia (ETH)	0	1	0	1
13	Burundi (BDI)	0	0	1	1
13	Germany (GER)	0	0	1	1
13	Poland (POL)	0	0	1	1
13	South Africa (RSA)	0	0	1	1
13	Ukraine (UKR)	0	0	1	1

=== Women ===
Championships	Gold	Silver	Bronze
1983 Helsinki	Mary Decker (USA)	Zamira Zaytseva (URS)	Yekaterina Podkopayeva (URS)
1987 Rome	Tetyana Samolenko (URS)	Hildegard Körner (GDR)	Doina Melinte (ROU)
1991 Tokyo	Hassiba Boulmerka (ALG)	Tetyana Dorovskikh (URS)	Lyudmila Rogachova (URS)
1993 Stuttgart	Liu Dong (CHN)	Sonia O'Sullivan (IRL)	Hassiba Boulmerka (ALG)
1995 Gothenburg	Hassiba Boulmerka (ALG)	Kelly Holmes (GBR)	Carla Sacramento (POR)
1997 Athens	Carla Sacramento (POR)	Regina Jacobs (USA)	Anita Weyermann (SUI)
1999 Seville	Svetlana Masterkova (RUS)	Regina Jacobs (USA)	Kutre Dulecha (ETH)
2001 Edmonton	Gabriela Szabo (ROU)	Violeta Szekely (ROU)	Natalya Gorelova (RUS)
2003 Saint-Denis	Tatyana Tomashova (RUS)	Süreyya Ayhan (TUR)	Hayley Tullett (GBR)
2005 Helsinki	Tatyana Tomashova (RUS)	Olga Yegorova (RUS)	Bouchra Ghezielle (FRA)
2007 Osaka	Maryam Yusuf Jamal (BHR)	Iryna Lishchynska (UKR)	Daniela Yordanova (BUL)
2009 Berlin	Maryam Yusuf Jamal (BHR)	Lisa Dobriskey (GBR)	Shannon Rowbury (USA)
2011 Daegu	Jennifer Simpson (USA)	Hannah England (GBR)	Natalia Rodríguez (ESP)
2013 Moscow	Abeba Aregawi (SWE)	Jennifer Simpson (USA)	Hellen Obiri (KEN)
2015 Beijing	Genzebe Dibaba (ETH)	Faith Kipyegon (KEN)	Sifan Hassan (NED)
2017 London	Faith Kipyegon (KEN)	Jennifer Simpson (USA)	Caster Semenya (RSA)
2019 Doha	Sifan Hassan (NED)	Faith Kipyegon (KEN)	Gudaf Tsegay (ETH)
2022 Eugene	Faith Kipyegon (KEN)	Gudaf Tsegay (ETH)	Laura Muir (GBR)
2023 Budapest	Faith Kipyegon (KEN)	Diribe Welteji (ETH)	Sifan Hassan (NED)
2025 Tokyo	Faith Kipyegon (KEN)	Dorcas Ewoi (KEN)	Jessica Hull (AUS)

==== Medalists by country ====
Rank	Nation	Gold	Silver	Bronze	Total
1	Kenya (KEN)	4	3	1	8
2	Russia (RUS)	3	1	1	5
3	United States (USA)	2	4	1	7
4	Algeria (ALG)	2	0	1	3
5	Bahrain (BHR)	2	0	0	2
7	Ethiopia (ETH)	1	2	2	5
7	Soviet Union (URS)	1	2	2	5
9	Romania (ROU)	1	1	1	3
10	Netherlands (NED)	1	0	2	3
11	Portugal (POR)	1	0	1	2
12	China (CHN)	1	0	0	1
12	Sweden (SWE)	1	0	0	1
14	Great Britain (GBR)	0	3	2	5
15	East Germany (GDR)	0	1	0	1
15	Ireland (IRL)	0	1	0	1
15	Ukraine (UKR)	0	1	0	1
15	Turkey (TUR)	0	1	0	1
19	Bulgaria (BUL)	0	0	1	1
19	France (FRA)	0	0	1	1
19	Spain (ESP)	0	0	1	1
19	Switzerland (SUI)	0	0	1	1
19	Australia (AUS)	0	0	1	1

== European Championships medalists ==
=== Men ===
Games	Gold	Silver	Bronze
1934 Turin	Luigi Beccali (ITA)	Miklós Szabó (HUN)	Roger Normand (FRA)
1938 Paris	Sydney Wooderson (GBR)	Joseph Mostert (BEL)	Luigi Beccali (ITA)
1946 Oslo	Lennart Strand (SWE)	Henry Eriksson (SWE)	Erik Jørgensen (DEN)
1950 Brussels	Willem Slijkhuis (NED)	Patrick El Mabrouk (FRA)	Bill Nankeville (GBR)
1954 Bern	Roger Bannister (GBR)	Gunnar Nielsen (DEN)	Stanislav Jungwirth (TCH)
1958 Stockholm	Brian Hewson (GBR)	Dan Waern (SWE)	Ron Delany (IRL)
1962 Belgrade	Michel Jazy (FRA)	Witold Baran (POL)	Tomáš Salinger (TCH)
1966 Budapest	Bodo Tümmler (FRG)	Michel Jazy (FRA)	Harald Norpoth (FRG)
1969 Athens	John Whetton (GBR)	Frank Murphy (IRL)	Henryk Szordykowski (POL)
1971 Helsinki	Franco Arese (ITA)	Henryk Szordykowski (POL)	Brendan Foster (GBR)
1974 Rome	Klaus-Peter Justus (GDR)	Tom Hansen (DEN)	Thomas Wessinghage (FRG)
1978 Prague	Steve Ovett (GBR)	Eamonn Coghlan (IRL)	David Moorcroft (GBR)
1982 Athens	Steve Cram (GBR)	Nikolay Kirov (URS)	José Manuel Abascal (ESP)
1986 Stuttgart	Steve Cram (GBR)	Sebastian Coe (GBR)	Han Kulker (NED)
1990 Split	Jens-Peter Herold (GDR)	Gennaro Di Napoli (ITA)	Mário Silva (POR)
1994 Helsinki	Fermín Cacho (ESP)	Isaac Viciosa (ESP)	Branko Zorko (CRO)
1998 Budapest	Reyes Estévez (ESP)	Rui Silva (POR)	Fermín Cacho (ESP)
2002 Munich	Mehdi Baala (FRA)	Reyes Estévez (ESP)	Rui Silva (POR)
2006 Gothenburg	Mehdi Baala (FRA)	Ivan Heshko (UKR)	Juan Carlos Higuero (ESP)
2010 Barcelona	Arturo Casado (ESP)	Carsten Schlangen (GER)	Manuel Olmedo (ESP)
2012 Helsinki	Henrik Ingebrigtsen (NOR)	Florian Carvalho (FRA)	David Bustos (ESP)
2014 Zürich	Mahiedine Mekhissi-Benabbad (FRA)	Henrik Ingebrigtsen (NOR)	Chris O'Hare (GBR)
2016 Amsterdam	Filip Ingebrigtsen (NOR)	David Bustos (ESP)	Henrik Ingebrigtsen (NOR)
2018 Berlin	Jakob Ingebrigtsen (NOR)	Marcin Lewandowski (POL)	Jake Wightman (GBR)
2022 Munich	Jakob Ingebrigtsen (NOR)	Jake Heyward (GBR)	Mario García (ESP)
2024 Rome	Jakob Ingebrigtsen (NOR)	Jochem Vermeulen (BEL)	Pietro Arese (ITA)
2026 Birmingham	Stefan Nillessen (NED)	Samuel Pihlström (SWE)	Andrew Coscoran (IRL)

=== Women ===
Games	Gold	Silver	Bronze
1969 Athens	Jaroslava Jehličková (TCH)	Maria Gommers (NED)	Paola Pigni (ITA)
1971 Helsinki	Karin Burneleit (GDR)	Gunhild Hoffmeister (GDR)	Ellen Tittel (FRG)
1974 Rome	Gunhild Hoffmeister (GDR)	Lilyana Tomova (BUL)	Grete Andersen (NOR)
1978 Prague	Giana Romanova (URS)	Natalia Mărășescu (ROU)	Totka Petrova (BUL)
1982 Athens	Olga Dvirna (URS)	Zamira Zaytseva (URS)	Gabriella Dorio (ITA)
1986 Stuttgart	Ravilya Agletdinova (URS)	Tetyana Samolenko (URS)	Doina Melinte (ROU)
1990 Split	Snežana Pajkić (YUG)	Ellen Kiessling (GDR)	Sandra Gasser (SUI)
1994 Helsinki	Lyudmila Rogachova (RUS)	Kelly Holmes (GBR)	Yekaterina Podkopayeva (RUS)
1998 Budapest	Svetlana Masterkova (RUS)	Carla Sacramento (POR)	Anita Weyermann (SUI)
2002 Munich	Süreyya Ayhan (TUR)	Gabriela Szabo (ROU)	Tatyana Tomashova (RUS)
2006 Gothenburg	Tatyana Tomashova (RUS)	Yuliya Chizhenko (RUS)	Daniela Yordanova (BUL)
2010 Barcelona	Nuria Fernández (ESP)	Hind Dehiba (FRA)	Natalia Rodríguez (ESP)
2012 Helsinki	Nuria Fernández (ESP)	Diana Sujew (GER)	Tereza Čapková (CZE)
2014 Zürich	Sifan Hassan (NED)	Abeba Aregawi (SWE)	Laura Weightman (GBR)
2016 Amsterdam	Angelika Cichocka (POL)	Sifan Hassan (NED)	Ciara Mageean (IRL)
2018 Berlin	Laura Muir (GBR)	Sofia Ennaoui (POL)	Laura Weightman (GBR)
2022 Munich	Laura Muir (GBR)	Ciara Mageean (IRL)	Sofia Ennaoui (POL)
2024 Rome	Ciara Mageean (IRL)	Georgia Hunter Bell (GBR)	Agathe Guillemot (FRA)
2026 Birmingham	Georgia Hunter Bell (GBR)	Klaudia Kazimierska (POL)	Patricia Silva (POR)

== World Indoor Championships medalists ==
=== Men ===
Games	Gold	Silver	Bronze
1985 Paris^{[A]}	Michael Hillardt (AUS)	José Luis González (ESP)	Joseph Chesire (KEN)
1987 Indianapolis	Marcus O'Sullivan (IRL)	José Manuel Abascal (ESP)	Han Kulker (NED)
1989 Budapest	Marcus O'Sullivan (IRL)	Hauke Fuhlbrügge (GDR)	Jeff Atkinson (USA)
1991 Seville	Noureddine Morceli (ALG)	Fermín Cacho (ESP)	Mário Silva (POR)
1993 Toronto	Marcus O'Sullivan (IRL)	David Strang (GBR)	Branko Zorko (CRO)
1995 Barcelona	Hicham El Guerrouj (MAR)	Mateo Cañellas (ESP)	Erik Nedeau (USA)
1997 Paris	Hicham El Guerrouj (MAR)	Rüdiger Stenzel (GER)	William Tanui (KEN)
1999 Maebashi	Haile Gebrselassie (ETH)	Laban Rotich (KEN)	Andrés Manuel Díaz (ESP)
2001 Lisbon	Rui Silva (POR)	Reyes Estévez (ESP)	Noah Ngeny (KEN)
2003 Birmingham	Driss Maazouzi (FRA)	Bernard Lagat (KEN)	Abdelkader Hachlaf (MAR)
2004 Budapest	Paul Korir (KEN)	Ivan Heshko (UKR)	Laban Rotich (KEN)
2006 Moscow	Ivan Heshko (UKR)	Daniel Kipchirchir Komen (KEN)	Elkanah Angwenyi (KEN)
2008 Valencia	Deresse Mekonnen (ETH)	Daniel Kipchirchir Komen (KEN)	Juan Carlos Higuero (ESP)
2010 Doha	Deresse Mekonnen (ETH)	Abdalaati Iguider (MAR)	Haron Keitany (KEN)
2012 Istanbul	Abdalaati Iguider (MAR)	İlham Tanui Özbilen (TUR)	Mekonnen Gebremedhin (ETH)
2014 Sopot	Ayanleh Souleiman (DJI)	Aman Wote (ETH)	Abdalaati Iguider (MAR)
2016 Portland	Matthew Centrowitz Jr. (USA)	Jakub Holuša (CZE)	Nick Willis (NZL)
2018 Birmingham	Samuel Tefera (ETH)	Marcin Lewandowski (POL)	Abdalaati Iguider (MAR)
2022 Belgrade	Samuel Tefera (ETH)	Jakob Ingebrigtsen (NOR)	Abel Kipsang (KEN)
2024 Glasgow	Geordie Beamish (NZL)	Cole Hocker (USA)	Hobbs Kessler (USA)
2025 Nanjing	Jakob Ingebrigtsen (NOR)	Neil Gourley (GBR)	Luke Houser (USA)
2026 Toruń	Mariano García (ESP)	Isaac Nader (POR)	Adam Spencer (AUS)

=== Women ===
Games	Gold	Silver	Bronze
1985 Paris^{[A]}	Elly van Hulst (NED)	Fița Lovin (ROU)	Brit McRoberts (CAN)
1987 Indianapolis	Doina Melinte (ROU)	Tatyana Samolenko (URS)	Svetlana Kitova (URS)
1989 Budapest	Doina Melinte (ROU)	Svetlana Kitova (URS)	Yvonne Mai (GDR)
1991 Seville	Lyudmila Rogachova (URS)	Ivana Kubešová (TCH)	Tudorita Chidu (ROU)
1993 Toronto	Yekaterina Podkopayeva (RUS)	Violeta Beclea (ROU)	Sandra Gasser (SUI)
1995 Barcelona	Regina Jacobs (USA)	Carla Sacramento (POR)	Maite Zúñiga (ESP)
1997 Paris	Yekaterina Podkopayeva (RUS)	Patricia Djaté-Taillard (FRA)	Lidia Chojecka (POL)
1999 Maebashi	Gabriela Szabo (ROU)	Violeta Beclea-Szekely (ROU)	Lidia Chojecka (POL)
2001 Lisbon	Hasna Benhassi (MAR)	Violeta Beclea-Szekely (ROU)	Natalya Gorelova (RUS)
2003 Birmingham	Regina Jacobs (USA)	Kelly Holmes (GBR)	Yekaterina Rozenberg (RUS)
2004 Budapest	Kutre Dulecha (ETH)	Carmen Douma-Hussar (CAN)	Gulnara Galkina (RUS)
2006 Moscow	Yuliya Fomenko (RUS)	Yelena Soboleva (RUS)	Maryam Yusuf Jamal (BHR)
2008 Valencia	Gelete Burka (ETH)	Maryam Yusuf Jamal (BHR)	Daniela Yordanova (BUL)
2010 Doha	Kalkidan Gezahegne (ETH)	Natalia Rodríguez (ESP)	Gelete Burka (ETH)
2012 Istanbul	Genzebe Dibaba (ETH)	Mariem Alaoui Selsouli (MAR)	Hind Dehiba (FRA)
2014 Sopot	Abeba Aregawi (SWE)	Axumawit Embaye (ETH)	Nicole Sifuentes (CAN)
2016 Portland	Sifan Hassan (NED)	Dawit Seyaum (ETH)	Gudaf Tsegay (ETH)
2018 Birmingham	Genzebe Dibaba (ETH)	Laura Muir (GBR)	Sifan Hassan (NED)
2022 Belgrade	Gudaf Tsegay (ETH)	Axumawit Embaye (ETH)	Hirut Meshesha (ETH)
2024 Glasgow	Freweyni Hailu (ETH)	Nikki Hiltz (USA)	Emily Mackay (USA)
2025 Nanjing	Gudaf Tsegay (ETH)	Diribe Welteji (ETH)	Georgia Hunter Bell (GBR)
2026 Toruń	Georgia Hunter Bell (GBR)	Jessica Hull (AUS)	Nikki Hiltz (USA)

- ^{^{A}} Known as the World Indoor Games

== World leading times ==
=== Men ===
Year	Time	Athlete	Place
1966	3:36.1 h	Jim Ryun (USA)	Berkeley
1967	3:33.1 h	Jim Ryun (USA)	Los Angeles
1968	3:34.9 h	Kipchoge Keino (KEN)	Mexico City
1969	3:37.2 h	Marty Liquori (USA)	Stuttgart
1970	3:34.0 h	Jean Wadoux (FRA)	Colombes
1971	3:36.0 h	Marty Liquori (USA)	Milan
1972	3:36.33	Pekka Vasala (FIN)	Munich
1973	3:34.6 h	Filbert Bayi (TAN)	Helsinki
1974	3:32.16	Filbert Bayi (TAN)	Christchurch
1975	3:32.4 h	John Walker (NZL)	Oslo
1976	3:34.19	John Walker (NZL)	Stockholm
1977	3:32.72	John Walker (NZL)	Brussels
1978	3:35.48	David Moorcroft (GBR)	Edmonton
1979	3:32.03	Sebastian Coe (GBR)	Zürich
1980	3:31.36	Steve Ovett (GBR)	Koblenz
1981	3:31.57	Steve Ovett (GBR)	Budapest
1982	3:32.12	Sydney Maree (USA)	Brussels
1983	3:30.77	Steve Ovett (GBR)	Rieti
1984	3:31.54	Saïd Aouita (MAR)	Hengelo
1985	3:29.46	Saïd Aouita (MAR)	Berlin
1986	3:29.77	Sebastian Coe (GBR)	Rieti
1987	3:30.69	Saïd Aouita (MAR)	Oslo
1988	3:30.95	Steve Cram (GBR)	Brussels
1989	3:30.55	Abdi Bile (SOM)	Rieti
1990	3:32.60	Noureddine Morceli (ALG)	Bologna
1991	3:31.00	Noureddine Morceli (ALG)	Helsinki
1992	3:28.86	Noureddine Morceli (ALG)	Rieti
1993	3:29.20	Noureddine Morceli (ALG)	Narbonne
1994	3:30.61	Noureddine Morceli (ALG)	Villeneuve-d'Ascq
1995	3:27.37	Noureddine Morceli (ALG)	Nice
1996	3:29.05	Hicham El Guerrouj (MAR)	Brussels
1997	3:28.91	Hicham El Guerrouj (MAR)	Zürich
1998	3:26.00	Hicham El Guerrouj (MAR)	Rome
1999	3:27.65	Hicham El Guerrouj (MAR)	Seville
2000	3:27.21	Hicham El Guerrouj (MAR)	Zürich
2001	3:26.12	Hicham El Guerrouj (MAR)	Brussels
2002	3:26.89	Hicham El Guerrouj (MAR)	Zürich
2003	3:28.40	Hicham El Guerrouj (MAR)	Brussels
2004	3:27.40	Bernard Lagat (KEN)	Zürich
2005	3:29.30	Bernard Lagat (USA)	Rieti
2006	3:29.02	Daniel Kipchirchir Komen (KEN)	Rome
2007	3:30.54	Alan Webb (USA)	Saint-Denis
2008	3:31.49	Daniel Kipchirchir Komen (KEN)	Monaco
2009	3:29.47	Augustine Kiprono Choge (KEN)	Berlin
2010	3:29.27	Silas Kiplagat (KEN)	Monaco
2011	3:30.46	Asbel Kiprop (KEN)	Rieti
2012	3:28.88	Asbel Kiprop (KEN)	Monaco
2013	3:27.72	Asbel Kiprop (KEN)	Monaco
2014	3:27.64	Silas Kiplagat (KEN)	Monaco
2015	3:26.69	Asbel Kiprop (KEN)	Monaco
2016	3:29.33	Asbel Kiprop (KEN)	Birmingham
2017	3:28.80	Elijah Manangoi (KEN)	Monaco
2018	3:28.41	Timothy Cheruiyot (KEN)	Monaco
2019	3:28.77	Timothy Cheruiyot (KEN)	Lausanne
2020	3:28.45	Timothy Cheruiyot (KEN)	Monaco
2021	3:28.28	Timothy Cheruiyot (KEN)	Monaco
2022	3:29.02	Jakob Ingebrigtsen (NOR)	Zürich
2023	3:27.14	Jakob Ingebrigtsen (NOR)	Chorzów
2024	3:26.73	Jakob Ingebrigtsen (NOR)	Monaco
2025	3:27.49	Azeddine Habz (FRA)	Paris
2026	3:27.62	Josh Kerr (GBR)	London

=== Women ===
Year	Time	Athlete	Place
1966	—	—	—
1967	—	—	—
1968	—	—	—
1969	—	—	—
1970	4:12.2 h	Karin Burneleit (GDR)	Berlin
1971	4:09.6 h	Karin Burneleit (GDR)	Helsinki
1972	4:01.4 h	Lyudmila Bragina (URS)	Munich
1973	4:04.6 h	Karin Krebs (GDR)	Potsdam
1974	4:02.25	Gunhild Hoffmeister (GDR)	Rome
1975	4:06.0 h	Nina Morgunova (URS)	Moscow
1976	3:56.0 h	Tatyana Kazankina (URS)	Podolsk
1977	4:02.65	Natalia Mărășescu (ROU)	Bucharest
1978	3:59.01	Giana Romanova (URS)	Prague
1979	3:57.4 h	Totka Petrova (BUL)	Athens
1980	3:52.47	Tatyana Kazankina (URS)	Zürich
1981	3:57.78	Olga Dvirna (URS)	Budapest
1982	3:54.23	Olga Dvirna (URS)	Kyiv
1983	3:57.12	Mary Slaney (USA)	Stockholm
1984	3:56.63	Nadezhda Ralldugina (URS)	Prague
1985	3:57.24	Mary Slaney (USA)	Brussels
1986	3:56.7 h	Doina Melinte (ROU)	Bucharest
1987	3:58.56	Tatyana Dorovskikh (URS)	Rome
1988	3:53.96	Paula Ivan (ROU)	Seoul
1989	3:59.23	Paula Ivan (ROU)	Nice
1990	3:58.69	Doina Melinte (ROU)	Villeneuve-d'Ascq
1991	3:59.16	Natalya Artyomova (RUS)	Zürich
1992	3:55.30	Hassiba Boulmerka (ALG)	Barcelona
1993	3:50.46	Qu Yunxia (CHN)	Beijing
1994	3:59.10	Sonia O'Sullivan (IRL)	Nice
1995	3:58.85	Sonia O'Sullivan (IRL)	Monaco
1996	3:56.77	Svetlana Masterkova (RUS)	Zürich
1997	3:50.98	Jiang Bo (CHN)	Shanghai
1998	3:56.97	Gabriela Szabo (ROU)	Monaco
1999	3:59.31	Violeta Szekely (ROU)	Zürich
2000	3:57.40	Suzy Favor-Hamilton (USA)	Oslo
2001	3:59.35	Violeta Szekely (ROU)	Monaco
2002	3:57.75	Süreyya Ayhan (TUR)	Brussels
2003	3:55.33	Süreyya Ayhan (TUR)	Brussels
2004	3:57.90	Kelly Holmes (GBR)	Athens
2005	3:56.79	Maryam Yusuf Jamal (BHR)	Rieti
2006	3:55.68	Yuliya Fomenko (RUS)	Saint-Denis
2007	3:58.75	Maryam Yusuf Jamal (BHR)	Osaka
2008	3:59.75 i	Gelete Burka (ETH)	Valencia
2009	3:56.55	Maryam Yusuf Jamal (BHR)	Rome
2010	3:57.65	Anna Alminova (RUS)	Saint-Denis
2011	4:00.06	Morgan Uceny (USA)	Brussels
2012	3:56.54	Abeba Aregawi (ETH)	Rome
2013	3:56.60	Abeba Aregawi (SWE)	Doha
2014	3:55.17 i	Genzebe Dibaba (ETH)	Karlsruhe
2015	3:50.07	Genzebe Dibaba (ETH)	Monaco
2016	3:55.22	Laura Muir (GBR)	Saint-Denis
2017	3:56.14	Sifan Hassan (NED)	Hengelo
2018	3:56.68	Genzebe Dibaba (ETH)	Chorzów
2019	3:51.95	Sifan Hassan (NED)	Doha
2020	3:57.40	Laura Muir (GBR)	Berlin
2021	3:51.07	Faith Kipyegon (KEN)	Monaco
2022	3:50.37	Faith Kipyegon (KEN)	Monaco
2023	3:49.11	Faith Kipyegon (KEN)	Florence
2024	3:49.04	Faith Kipyegon (KEN)	Paris
2025	3:48.68	Faith Kipyegon (KEN)	Eugene
2026	3:54.05	Klaudia Kazimierska (POL)	Brussels

== Other sports ==
In swimming, the 1500 m (1640 yd) race is commonly referred to as "the swimmer's mile", and is often the longest distance swum by competitors in a pool. The standard distance triathlon also employs the swimmer's mile, except that it is in open water instead of in a pool. 1500 metres is also an event in speed skating and wheelchair racing.

The world records for the distance in swimming for men are 14:31.02 (swum in a 50-metre pool) by Sun Yang, 14:08.06 (swum in a 25-metre pool) by Gregorio Paltrinieri; and by women 15:20.48 (swum in a 50-metre pool) by Katie Ledecky, and 15:19.71 (swum in a 25-metre pool) by Mireia Belmonte García.

The world records for the distance in speed skating are 1:40.17 by Kjeld Nuis and 1:49.83 by Miho Takagi.

The records for wheelchair racing vary by disability classification:

- T51: 4:53.50 by Hélder Mestre
- T52: 3:29.79 by Raymond Martin
- T53 and T54: 2:51.84 by Brent Lakatos

== See also ==
- National records in the 1500 metres
- 1600 meters
- Mile run
