= 1989 IAAF World Cross Country Championships =

- Organisers: IAAF
- Edition: 17th
- Date: March 19
- Host city: Stavanger, Rogaland, Norway
- Venue: Scanvest Ring
- Events: 4
- Distances: 12 km – Senior men 8 km – Junior men 6 km – Senior women 4 km – Junior women
- Participation: 568 athletes from 41 nations

The 1989 IAAF World Cross Country Championships was held in Stavanger, Norway, at the Scanvest Ring on March 19, 1989. A report on the event was given in the Glasgow Herald.

Complete results for senior men, junior men, senior women, junior women, medallists, and the results of British athletes were published.

== Medallists ==
Event	Gold		Silver		Bronze	
Individual
Senior men (12 km)	John Ngugi; Kenya	39:42	Tim Hutchings; United Kingdom	40:10	Wilfred Kirochi; Kenya	40:21
Junior men (8 km)	Addis Abebe; Ethiopia	25:07	Kipyego Kororia; Kenya	25:31	Stephenson Nyamau; Kenya	25:33
Senior women (6 km)	Annette Sergent; France	22:27	Nadezhda Stepanova; Soviet Union	22:34	Lynn Williams; Canada	22:41
Junior women (4 km)	Malin Ewerlöf; Sweden	15:23	Olga Nazarkina; Soviet Union	15:30	Esther Saina; Kenya	15:41
Team
Senior men	Kenya	44	United Kingdom	147	Ethiopia	162
Junior men	Kenya	14	Ethiopia	22	Italy	76
Senior women	Soviet Union	58	France	60	United States	68
Junior women	Kenya	40	Soviet Union	68	Portugal	84

== Race results ==
=== Senior men's race (12 km) ===
Individual race
Rank	Athlete	Country	Time
1st place, gold medalist(s)	John Ngugi	Kenya	39:42
2nd place, silver medalist(s)	Tim Hutchings	United Kingdom	40:10
3rd place, bronze medalist(s)	Wilfred Kirochi	Kenya	40:21
4	Steve Moneghetti	Australia	40:24
5	Tesfaye Tafa	Ethiopia	40:26
6	Alejandro Gómez	Spain	40:29
7	Andrew Masai	Kenya	40:32
8	Kipkemboi Kimeli	Kenya	40:34
9	Moses Tanui	Kenya	40:42
10	John Halvorsen	Norway	40:45
11	Bruno Le Stum	France	40:48
12	Francesco Panetta	Italy	40:51
Full results

Teams
Rank	Team	Points
1st place, gold medalist(s)	Kenya: John Ngugi / 1; Wilfred Kirochi / 3; Andrew Masai / 7; Kipkemboi Kimeli / 8; Moses Tanui / 9; Joseph Kiptum / 16; (Boniface Merande) / (25); (Jackson Ruto) / (36); (Ibrahim Kinuthia) / (44)	44
2nd place, silver medalist(s)	United Kingdom: Tim Hutchings / 2; Gary Staines / 14; Dave Clarke / 15; Craig Mochrie / 22; Dave Lewis / 45; Richard Nerurkar / 49; (Eamonn Martin) / (93); (Geoff Turnbull) / (136); (Roger Hackney) / (DNF)	147
3rd place, bronze medalist(s)	Ethiopia: Tesfaye Tafa / 5; Bekele Debele / 13; Wolde Silasse Melkessa / 27; Melese Feissa / 33; Debebe Demisse / 37; Haji Bulbula / 47; (Bedile Kibret) / (77); (Demeke Bekele) / (97); (Habte Negash) / (125)	162
4	France	187
5	Spain	189
6	Australia	284
7	Portugal	305
8	Italy	318
Full results

- Note: Athletes in parentheses did not score for the team result

=== Junior men's race (8 km) ===
Individual race
Rank	Athlete	Country	Time
1st place, gold medalist(s)	Addis Abebe	Ethiopia	25:07
2nd place, silver medalist(s)	Kipyego Kororia	Kenya	25:31
3rd place, bronze medalist(s)	Stephenson Nyamau	Kenya	25:33
4	Thomas Osano	Kenya	25:33
5	William Koskei Chemitei	Kenya	25:36
6	Dube Jillo	Ethiopia	25:40
7	Tesgie Legesse	Ethiopia	25:52
8	Tesfaye Bekele	Ethiopia	26:03
9	Christian Leuprecht	Italy	26:07
10	Lemi Erpassa	Ethiopia	26:18
11	Assefa Gebremedhin	Ethiopia	26:29
12	Spencer Duval	United Kingdom	26:32
Full results

Teams
Rank	Team	Points
1st place, gold medalist(s)	Kenya: Kipyego Kororia / 2; Stephenson Nyamau / 3; Thomas Osano / 4; William Koskei Chemitei / 5; (Jonah Birir) / (13)	14
2nd place, silver medalist(s)	Ethiopia: Addis Abebe / 1; Dube Jillo / 6; Tesgie Legesse / 7; Tesfaye Bekele / 8; (Lemi Erpassa) / (10); (Assefa Gebremedhin) / (11)	22
3rd place, bronze medalist(s)	Italy: Christian Leuprecht / 9; Vincenzo Modica / 17; Francesco Bennici / 23; Angelo Giardiello / 27; (Antonello Barretta) / (110); (Sabino Francavilla) / (121)	76
4	United Kingdom	95
5	Poland	131
6	Spain	147
7	Japan	170
8	Algeria	172
Full results

- Note: Athletes in parentheses did not score for the team result

=== Senior women's race (6 km) ===
Individual race
Rank	Athlete	Country	Time
1st place, gold medalist(s)	Annette Sergent	France	22:27
2nd place, silver medalist(s)	Nadezhda Stepanova	Soviet Union	22:34
3rd place, bronze medalist(s)	Lynn Williams	Canada	22:41
4	Jane Ngotho	Kenya	22:57
5	Jackie Perkins	Australia	22:59
6	Lynn Jennings	United States	22:59
7	Jill Hunter	United Kingdom	23:00
8	Véronique Collard	Belgium	23:01
9	Yelena Romanova	Soviet Union	23:02
10	Maria Lelut	France	23:03
11	Luchia Yeshak	Ethiopia	23:04
12	Conceição Ferreira	Portugal	23:13
Full results

Teams
Rank	Team	Points
1st place, gold medalist(s)	Soviet Union: Nadezhda Stepanova / 2; Yelena Romanova / 9; Natalya Sorokivskaya / 20; Regina Chistyakova / 27; (Natalya Artyomova) / (67); (Tatyana Pozdnyakova) / (69)	58
2nd place, silver medalist(s)	France: Annette Sergent / 1; Maria Lelut / 10; Martine Fays / 17; Marie-Pierre Duros / 32; (Patricia Demilly) / (53); (Rosario Murcia) / (93)	60
3rd place, bronze medalist(s)	United States: Lynn Jennings / 6; Margaret Groos / 16; Carla Borovicka / 21; Annette Hand / 25; (Sabrina Dornhoefer) / (29); (Shelly Steely) / (86)	68
4	Portugal	84
5	Ethiopia	98
6	United Kingdom	99
7	Australia	130
8	Canada	133
Full results

- Note: Athletes in parentheses did not score for the team result

=== Junior women's race (4 km) ===
Individual race
Rank	Athlete	Country	Time
1st place, gold medalist(s)	Malin Ewerlöf	Sweden	15:23
2nd place, silver medalist(s)	Olga Nazarkina	Soviet Union	15:30
3rd place, bronze medalist(s)	Esther Saina	Kenya	15:41
4	Ann Mwangi	Kenya	15:59
5	Jane Ekimat	Kenya	16:01
6	Lisa Harvey	Canada	16:03
7	Shiki Terasaki	Japan	16:04
8	Mónica Gama	Portugal	16:12
9	Suzy Walsham	Australia	16:14
10	Tina Hall	United States	16:15
11	Yumi Osaki	Japan	16:16
12	Nicole Corbin	Australia	16:20
Full results

Teams
Rank	Team	Points
1st place, gold medalist(s)	Kenya: Esther Saina / 3; Ann Mwangi / 4; Jane Ekimat / 5; Tegla Loroupe / 28	40
2nd place, silver medalist(s)	Soviet Union: Olga Nazarkina / 2; Elena Khaliman / 18; Larisa Alekseyeva / 21; Svetlana Yepishkina / 27; (Svetlana Nesterova) / (29); (Olga Bogdanova) / (32)	68
3rd place, bronze medalist(s)	Portugal: Mónica Gama / 8; Carla Sacramento / 17; Carla Machado / 20; Luisa Diaz / 39; (Carla Azeitero) / (54); (Ana Oliveira) / (74)	84
4	Japan	90
5	Canada	103
6	United States	104
7	Spain	125
8	France	149
Full results

- Note: Athletes in parentheses did not score for the team result

== Medal table (unofficial) ==
Rank	Nation	Gold	Silver	Bronze	Total
1	Kenya (KEN)	4	1	3	8
2	Soviet Union (URS)	1	3	0	4
3	Ethiopia (ETH)	1	1	1	3
4	France (FRA)	1	1	0	2
5	Sweden (SWE)	1	0	0	1
6	United Kingdom (UKB)	0	2	0	2
7	Canada (CAN)	0	0	1	1
7	Italy (ITA)	0	0	1	1
7	Portugal (POR)	0	0	1	1
7	United States (USA)	0	0	1	1
Totals (10 entries)		8	8	8	24

- Note: Totals include both individual and team medals, with medals in the team competition counting as one medal.

== Participation ==
An unofficial count yields the participation of 568 athletes from 41 countries. This is in agreement with the official numbers as published.

- Algeria (12)
- Aruba (1)
- Australia (25)
- Belgium (17)
- Brazil (13)
- Canada (25)
- Chinese Taipei (3)
- Colombia (2)
- Cyprus (2)
- Denmark (16)
- Ethiopia (20)
- Finland (26)
- France (26)
- Hungary (10)
- Iceland (12)
- Ireland (22)
- Israel (2)
- Italy (25)
- Jamaica (3)
- Japan (26)
- Kenya (19)
- Mauritius (4)
- Morocco (12)
- Netherlands (11)
- New Zealand (13)
- North Yemen (6)
- Norway (26)
- Poland (11)
- Portugal (23)
- Romania (5)
- Rwanda (1)
- Soviet Union (22)
- Spain (27)
- Sweden (14)
- Switzerland (11)
- Turkey (8)
- United Kingdom (27)
- United States (27)
- Venezuela (2)
- West Germany (7)
- Zambia (4)

== See also ==
- 1989 IAAF World Cross Country Championships – Senior men's race
- 1989 IAAF World Cross Country Championships – Junior men's race
- 1989 IAAF World Cross Country Championships – Senior women's race
- 1989 IAAF World Cross Country Championships – Junior women's race
- 1989 in athletics (track and field)
