= 1989 IAAF World Cross Country Championships – Junior men's race =

Junior men's race at the 1989 IAAF World Cross Country Championships
- Organisers: IAAF
- Edition: 17th
- Date: March 19
- Host city: Stavanger, Rogaland, Norway
- Venue: Scanvest Ring
- Events: 1
- Distances: 8 km – Junior men
- Participation: 134 athletes from 31 nations

The Junior men's race at the 1989 IAAF World Cross Country Championships was held in Stavanger, Norway, at the Scanvest Ring on March 19, 1989. A report on the event was given in the Glasgow Herald.

Complete results, medallists, and the results of British athletes were published.

== Race results ==
=== Junior men's race (8 km) ===
==== Individual ====
| Rank | Athlete | Country | Time |
|---|---|---|---|
| 1st place, gold medalist(s) | Addis Abebe | Ethiopia | 25:07 |
| 2nd place, silver medalist(s) | Kipyego Kororia | Kenya | 25:31 |
| 3rd place, bronze medalist(s) | Stephenson Nyamau | Kenya | 25:33 |
| 4 | Thomas Osano | Kenya | 25:33 |
| 5 | William Koskei Chemitei | Kenya | 25:36 |
| 6 | Jillo Dube | Ethiopia | 25:40 |
| 7 | Tesgie Legesse | Ethiopia | 25:52 |
| 8 | Tesfaye Bekele | Ethiopia | 26:03 |
| 9 | Christian Leuprecht | Italy | 26:07 |
| 10 | Lemi Erpassa | Ethiopia | 26:18 |
| 11 | Assefa Gebremedhin | Ethiopia | 26:29 |
| 12 | Spencer Duval | United Kingdom | 26:32 |
| 13 | Jonah Birir | Kenya | 26:33 |
| 14 | Jaroslaw Cichocki | Poland | 26:34 |
| 15 | Andrea Erni | Switzerland | 26:34 |
| 16 | Noriaki Yanagi | Japan | 26:41 |
| 17 | Vincenzo Modica | Italy | 26:42 |
| 18 | David Pujolar | Spain | 26:44 |
| 19 | Michał Bartoszak | Poland | 26:46 |
| 20 | John Kavanagh | Australia | 26:47 |
| 21 | Claes Nyberg | Sweden | 26:49 |
| 22 | Jon Dennis | United Kingdom | 26:51 |
| 23 | Francesco Bennici | Italy | 26:56 |
| 24 | Jason Bunston | Canada | 26:58 |
| 25 | Richard Lindroos | New Zealand | 27:03 |
| 26 | Noureddine Morceli | Algeria | 27:05 |
| 27 | Angelo Giardiello | Italy | 27:07 |
| 28 | Carsten Arndt | West Germany | 27:08 |
| 29 | John Mayock | United Kingdom | 27:10 |
| 30 | Paul Logan | Ireland | 27:10 |
| 31 | Osamu Nara | Japan | 27:12 |
| 32 | Malcolm Campbell | United Kingdom | 27:13 |
| 33 | Remzi Atli | Turkey | 27:14 |
| 34 | Paulo Guerra | Portugal | 27:15 |
| 35 | Arthur Osman | Poland | 27:17 |
| 36 | Teodoro Cuñado | Spain | 27:19 |
| 37 | Jean-Michel Sirieix | France | 27:20 |
| 38 | Joseph Kibur | Canada | 27:22 |
| 39 | Mohamed Driouche | Algeria | 27:25 |
| 40 | Laurent Saudrais | France | 27:26 |
| 41 | Jerome Claeys | Belgium | 27:27 |
| 42 | Ryad Gatte | Algeria | 27:28 |
| 43 | László Kofias | Hungary | 27:28 |
| 44 | José Luis Rodríguez | Spain | 27:29 |
| 45 | Dean Rose | Australia | 27:30 |
| 46 | Sean McCusker | United States | 27:30 |
| 47 | Sergey Bondarenko | Soviet Union | 27:31 |
| 48 | Ali Canpolat | Turkey | 27:32 |
| 49 | Miguel Nieto | Spain | 27:33 |
| 50 | Morgan Tollofsén | Sweden | 27:36 |
| 51 | Steven Brooks | United Kingdom | 27:36 |
| 52 | Paul Butterfield | United States | 27:37 |
| 53 | Robert Mitchison | Australia | 27:38 |
| 54 | Veli-Matti Ranta | Finland | 27:38 |
| 55 | Seamus Power | Ireland | 27:39 |
| 56 | Kazuhiro Kawauchi | Japan | 27:41 |
| 57 | Geert Royaert | Belgium | 27:44 |
| 58 | Dean Ogilvie | New Zealand | 27:46 |
| 59 | Mark Blockhaus | West Germany | 27:48 |
| 60 | Javier Caballero | Spain | 27:48 |
| 61 | José Naveria | Spain | 27:48 |
| 62 | Andrew Pearson | United Kingdom | 27:54 |
| 63 | Miroslaw Plawgo | Poland | 27:55 |
| 64 | Vladimir Golyas | Soviet Union | 27:56 |
| 65 | Rabah Merazka | Algeria | 28:00 |
| 66 | John Lacey | Ireland | 28:01 |
| 67 | Seiji Kushibe | Japan | 28:03 |
| 68 | Teppo Jalonen | Finland | 28:05 |
| 69 | Tamás Kliszek | Hungary | 28:06 |
| 70 | Satilmis Atmaca | Turkey | 28:06 |
| 71 | Iván Adamis | Hungary | 28:07 |
| 72 | Nabil Ayari | France | 28:08 |
| 73 | Pierre Morath | Switzerland | 28:08 |
| 74 | Shawn McKay | Canada | 28:10 |
| 75 | Takahide Uei | Japan | 28:11 |
| 76 | Lee Town | Australia | 28:13 |
| 77 | Stephane Picard | France | 28:14 |
| 78 | Abdelkrim Benzai | Algeria | 28:15 |
| 79 | Pasi Mattila | Finland | 28:16 |
| 80 | Hiroyuki Nakamura | Japan | 28:17 |
| 81 | Grzegorz Krystek | Poland | 28:20 |
| 82 | Gabriel Schmutz | Switzerland | 28:21 |
| 83 | Jürgen Kerl | West Germany | 28:22 |
| 84 | Steen Nielsen | Denmark | 28:23 |
| 85 | Cern Basher | Canada | 28:23 |
| 86 | Spencer Punter | Canada | 28:25 |
| 87 | John Schondelmaier | West Germany | 28:27 |
| 88 | Dave Scudamore | United States | 28:30 |
| 89 | Awad Saleh Ahmed | North Yemen | 28:31 |
| 90 | Brahim Jabbour | Morocco | 28:31 |
| 91 | Hocine Aithammou | France | 28:33 |
| 92 | Jeff Schiebler | Canada | 28:33 |
| 93 | Colin de Burca | Ireland | 28:34 |
| 94 | Santtu Mäkinen | Finland | 28:35 |
| 95 | Ville-Veikko Sainio | Finland | 28:37 |
| 96 | Julius Solheim | Norway | 28:37 |
| 97 | Jens Wilky | West Germany | 28:38 |
| 98 | Pál Ilisz | Hungary | 28:39 |
| 99 | Philippe Jacquemin | Belgium | 28:40 |
| 100 | Viktor Karpenko | Soviet Union | 28:40 |
| 101 | Svein Inge Buhaug | Norway | 28:43 |
| 102 | Hachani Guiroud | Algeria | 28:44 |
| 103 | Mark Carroll | Ireland | 28:47 |
| 104 | Glen le Gros | New Zealand | 28:49 |
| 105 | Marco Gielen | Netherlands | 28:50 |
| 106 | Hartmut Merl | West Germany | 28:52 |
| 107 | Harley Hanson | United States | 28:54 |
| 108 | Erdogan Gunduz | Turkey | 28:57 |
| 109 | Glenn Franklin | Australia | 29:00 |
| 110 | Antonello Barretta | Italy | 29:02 |
| 111 | Richard Russell | Australia | 29:03 |
| 112 | Henning Andersen | Denmark | 29:05 |
| 113 | Hans Ulin | Belgium | 29:07 |
| 114 | Roland Münger | Switzerland | 29:11 |
| 115 | Alexandre dos Santos | Brazil | 29:12 |
| 116 | Anwar Al-Harazi | North Yemen | 29:14 |
| 117 | Øystein Arild | Norway | 29:18 |
| 118 | Roman Korzh | Soviet Union | 29:25 |
| 119 | Bård Lyngnes | Norway | 29:30 |
| 120 | István Pintér | Hungary | 29:42 |
| 121 | Sabino Francavilla | Italy | 29:48 |
| 122 | Eiliv Gjesdal | Norway | 29:48 |
| 123 | Sigve Stenersen | Norway | 29:49 |
| 124 | Anders Szalkai | Sweden | 29:56 |
| 125 | David Smith | United States | 30:04 |
| 126 | John Morrison | United States | 30:09 |
| 127 | Jari Tuominen | Finland | 30:15 |
| 128 | Richard Potts | New Zealand | 30:32 |
| 129 | Ahmed Al-Saqaf | North Yemen | 30:54 |
| 130 | Kent Claesson | Sweden | 31:09 |
| 131 | Björn Petursson | Iceland | 31:17 |
| 132 | Pascal Face | Mauritius | 31:35 |
| 133 | Goim Hussein | North Yemen | 31:45 |
| 134 | Ramlengum Adaken | Mauritius | 34:23 |

==== Teams ====
| Rank | Team | Points |
|---|---|---|
| 1st place, gold medalist(s) | Kenya: Kipyego Kororia / 2; Stephenson Nyamau / 3; Thomas Osano / 4; William Koskei Chemitei / 5; (Jonah Birir) / (13) | 14 |
| 2nd place, silver medalist(s) | Ethiopia: Addis Abebe / 1; Jillo Dube / 6; Tesgie Legesse / 7; Tesfaye Bekele / 8; (Lemi Erpassa) / (10); (Assefa Gebremedhin) / (11) | 22 |
| 3rd place, bronze medalist(s) | Italy: Christian Leuprecht / 9; Vincenzo Modica / 17; Francesco Bennici / 23; Angelo Giardiello / 27; (Antonello Barretta) / (110); (Sabino Francavilla) / (121) | 76 |
| 4 | United Kingdom: Spencer Duval / 12; Jon Dennis / 22; John Mayock / 29; Malcolm Campbell / 32; (Steven Brooks) / (51); (Andrew Pearson) / (62) | 95 |
| 5 | Poland: Jaroslaw Cichocki / 14; Michał Bartoszak / 19; Arthur Osman / 35; Miroslaw Plawgo / 63; (Grzegorz Krystek) / (81) | 131 |
| 6 | Spain: David Pujolar / 18; Teodoro Cuñado / 36; José Luis Rodríguez / 44; Miguel Nieto / 49; (Javier Caballero) / (60); (José Naveria) / (61) | 147 |
| 7 | Japan: Noriaki Yanagi / 16; Osamu Nara / 31; Kazuhiro Kawauchi / 56; Seiji Kushibe / 67; (Takahide Uei) / (75); (Hiroyuki Nakamura) / (80) | 170 |
| 8 | Algeria: Noureddine Morceli / 26; Mohamed Driouche / 39; Ryad Gatte / 42; Rabah Merazka / 65; (Abdelkrim Benzai) / (78); (Hachani Guiroud) / (102) | 172 |
| 9 | Australia: John Kavanagh / 20; Dean Rose / 45; Robert Mitchison / 53; Lee Town / 76; (Glenn Franklin) / (109); (Richard Russell) / (111) | 194 |
| 10 | Canada: Jason Bunston / 24; Joseph Kibur / 38; Shawn McKay / 74; Cern Basher / 85; (Spencer Punter) / (86); (Jeff Schiebler) / (92) | 221 |
| 11 | France: Jean-Michel Sirieix / 37; Laurent Saudrais / 40; Nabil Ayari / 72; Stephane Picard / 77; (Hocine Aithammou) / (91) | 226 |
| 12 | Ireland: Paul Logan / 30; Seamus Power / 55; John Lacey / 66; Colin de Burca / 93; (Mark Carroll) / (103) | 244 |
| 13 | West Germany: Carsten Arndt / 28; Mark Blockhaus / 59; Jürgen Kerl / 83; John Schondelmaier / 87; (Jens Wilky) / (97); (Hartmut Merl) / (106) | 257 |
| 14 | Turkey: Remzi Atli / 33; Ali Canpolat / 48; Satilmis Atmaca / 70; Erdogan Gunduz / 108 | 259 |
| 15 | Hungary: László Kofias / 43; Tamás Kliszek / 69; Iván Adamis / 71; Pál Ilisz / 98; (István Pintér) / (120) | 281 |
| 16 | Switzerland: Andrea Erni / 15; Pierre Morath / 73; Gabriel Schmutz / 82; Roland Münger / 114 | 284 |
| 17 | United States: Sean McCusker / 46; Paul Butterfield / 52; Dave Scudamore / 88; Harley Hanson / 107; (David Smith) / (125); (John Morrison) / (126) | 293 |
| 18 | Finland: Veli-Matti Ranta / 54; Teppo Jalonen / 68; Pasi Mattila / 79; Santtu Mäkinen / 94; (Ville-Veikko Sainio) / (95); (Jari Tuominen) / (127) | 295 |
| 19 | Belgium: Jerome Claeys / 41; Geert Royaert / 57; Philippe Jacquemin / 99; Hans Ulin / 113 | 310 |
| 20 | New Zealand: Richard Lindroos / 25; Dean Ogilvie / 58; Glen le Gros / 104; Richard Potts / 128 | 315 |
| 21 | Sweden: Claes Nyberg / 21; Morgan Tollofsén / 50; Anders Szalkai / 124; Kent Claesson / 130 | 325 |
| 22 | Soviet Union: Sergey Bondarenko / 47; Vladimir Golyas / 64; Viktor Karpenko / 100; Roman Korzh / 118 | 329 |
| 23 | Norway: Julius Solheim / 96; Svein Inge Buhaug / 101; Øystein Arild / 117; Bård Lyngnes / 119; (Eiliv Gjesdal) / (122); (Sigve Stenersen) / (123) | 433 |
| 24 | North Yemen: Awad Saleh Ahmed / 89; Anwar Al-Harazi / 116; Ahmed Al-Saqaf / 129; Goim Hussein / 133 | 467 |

- Note: Athletes in parentheses did not score for the team result

== Participation ==
An unofficial count yields the participation of 134 athletes from 31 countries in the Junior men's race. This is in agreement with the official numbers as published.

- Algeria (6)
- Australia (6)
- Belgium (4)
- Brazil (1)
- Canada (6)
- Denmark (2)
- Ethiopia (6)
- Finland (6)
- France (5)
- Hungary (5)
- Iceland (1)
- Ireland (5)
- Italy (6)
- Japan (6)
- Kenya (5)
- Mauritius (2)
- Morocco (1)
- Netherlands (1)
- New Zealand (4)
- North Yemen (4)
- Norway (6)
- Poland (5)
- Portugal (1)
- Soviet Union (4)
- Spain (6)
- Sweden (4)
- Switzerland (4)
- Turkey (4)
- United Kingdom (6)
- United States (6)
- West Germany (6)

== See also ==
- 1989 IAAF World Cross Country Championships – Senior men's race
- 1989 IAAF World Cross Country Championships – Senior women's race
- 1989 IAAF World Cross Country Championships – Junior women's race
