= 1989 IAAF World Cross Country Championships – Junior women's race =

Junior women's race at the 1989 IAAF World Cross Country Championships
- Organisers: IAAF
- Edition: 17th
- Date: March 19
- Host city: Stavanger, Rogaland, Norway
- Venue: Scanvest Ring
- Events: 1
- Distances: 4 km – Junior women
- Participation: 114 athletes from 27 nations

The Junior women's race at the 1989 IAAF World Cross Country Championships was held in Stavanger, Norway, at the Scanvest Ring on March 19, 1989. A report on the event was given in the Glasgow Herald.

Complete results, medallists, and the results of British athletes were published.

== Race results ==
=== Junior women's race (4 km) ===
==== Individual ====
Rank	Athlete	Country	Time
1st place, gold medalist(s)	Malin Ewerlöf	Sweden	15:23
2nd place, silver medalist(s)	Olga Nazarkina	Soviet Union	15:30
3rd place, bronze medalist(s)	Esther Saina	Kenya	15:41
4	Ann Mwangi	Kenya	15:59
5	Jane Ekimat	Kenya	16:01
6	Lisa Harvey	Canada	16:03
7	Shiki Terasaki	Japan	16:04
8	Mónica Gama	Portugal	16:12
9	Suzy Walsham	Australia	16:14
10	Tina Hall	United States	16:15
11	Yumi Osaki	Japan	16:16
12	Nicole Corbin	Australia	16:20
13	Anna Gunasekera	Canada	16:20
14	Andrea Whitcombe	United Kingdom	16:22
15	Tamara Salomon	Canada	16:23
16	Jennifer Robertson	United States	16:23
17	Carla Sacramento	Portugal	16:23
18	Elena Khaliman	Soviet Union	16:25
19	Azumi Miyazaki	Japan	16:28
20	Carla Machado	Portugal	16:29
21	Larisa Alekseyeva	Soviet Union	16:29
22	Concepción Santaren	Spain	16:30
23	Mihaela Ciu	Romania	16:34
24	Nadia Ouaziz	Morocco	16:35
25	Angelica Manrique	Spain	16:38
26	Katrina Price	United States	16:40
27	Svetlana Yepishkina	Soviet Union	16:41
28	Tegla Loroupe	Kenya	16:43
29	Svetlana Nesterova	Soviet Union	16:48
30	Helene Baudrand	France	16:51
31	Amina Maanaoui	Morocco	16:52
32	Olga Bogdanova	Soviet Union	16:53
33	Celine Martin	France	16:54
34	Anke Mebold	West Germany	16:54
35	Marja Sankelo	Finland	16:54
36	Claudia Mirela Bortoi	Romania	16:56
37	Josefina Gutierrez	Spain	16:57
38	Corinne Gilbert	France	16:58
39	Luisa Diaz	Portugal	16:58
40	Margaret Synnott	Ireland	17:01
41	Maria Ortega	Spain	17:01
42	Éva Dóczi	Hungary	17:02
43	Anikó Javos	Hungary	17:03
44	Pia Lautala	Finland	17:04
45	Seloua Ouaziz	Morocco	17:05
46	Hilde Hovdenak	Norway	17:05
47	Kate Anderson	Australia	17:06
48	Christelle Fuseau	France	17:06
49	Julia Vaquero	Spain	17:07
50	Laurence Fontaine	France	17:07
51	Mary Chavula	Zambia	17:07
52	Tara Flynn	United States	17:10
53	Akari Ito	Japan	17:11
54	Carla Azeitero	Portugal	17:11
55	Tuula Kero	Finland	17:11
56	Gertrude Chikwanda	Zambia	17:12
57	Patricia Sancey	France	17:12
58	Lisa York	United Kingdom	17:13
59	Sandra van den Haesevelde	Belgium	17:14
60	Francoise Nemry	Belgium	17:15
61	Trine Pilskog	Norway	17:16
62	Najat Ouali	Morocco	17:17
63	Andrea Tschopp	Switzerland	17:20
64	Sari Veteläinen	Finland	17:20
65	Anne Veteläinen	Finland	17:20
66	Maria Luisa Lárraga	Spain	17:21
67	Makbule Asik	Turkey	17:21
68	Lee Hsiao-Chuan	Chinese Taipei	17:22
69	Beni Gras	Canada	17:22
70	Ingeborg Huijssen	Belgium	17:24
71	Réka Csizi	Hungary	17:26
72	Brynhild Synstnes	Norway	17:27
73	Nuța Olaru	Romania	17:29
74	Ana Oliveira	Portugal	17:29
75	Patrizia Ragno	Italy	17:30
76	Susan Parker	United Kingdom	17:30
77	Vanessa Molloy	Ireland	17:31
78	Cindy Foley	Canada	17:31
79	Cindy Davis	United States	17:34
80	Matilde Ravizza	Italy	17:35
81	Exildah Bunda	Zambia	17:36
82	Maxine Newman	United Kingdom	17:36
83	Nathalie Davey	Ireland	17:37
84	Mounia Aboulahcen	Morocco	17:37
85	Brenda Sleeuwenhoek	Netherlands	17:39
86	Leila Baghdad	Algeria	17:40
87	Agata Balsamo	Italy	17:40
88	Susan Tschappaat	Switzerland	17:40
89	Mónika Tóth	Hungary	17:41
90	Kahla Abbou	Algeria	17:43
91	Siri Holtung	Norway	17:45
92	Sandra Heuberger	Switzerland	17:46
93	Aurica Buia	Romania	17:47
94	Michelle Maloney	Ireland	17:49
95	Carol Hayward	United Kingdom	17:54
96	Rowena Lynch	Ireland	17:56
97	Yasuko Kawate	Japan	17:58
98	Zohra Djami Kheddim	Algeria	18:00
99	Seana Arnold	United States	18:00
100	Tonya Todd	Canada	18:04
101	Célia dos Santos	Brazil	18:09
102	Hanne Pedersen	Norway	18:10
103	Karen Sutton	United Kingdom	18:14
104	Simona Staicu	Romania	18:15
105	Mónika Balint	Hungary	18:21
106	Heidi Solstad	Norway	18:24
107	Patricia White	Australia	18:27
108	Tami Messaouda	Algeria	18:34
109	Malahat Kokalp	Turkey	18:38
110	Cristina Tenaglia	Italy	18:53
111	Dounia Kara	Algeria	18:54
112	Fabia Trabaldo	Italy	19:30
113	Marvis Chiloshya	Zambia	19:36
114	Naima Souag	Algeria	19:50

==== Teams ====
Rank	Team	Points
1st place, gold medalist(s)	Kenya: Esther Saina / 3; Ann Mwangi / 4; Jane Ekimat / 5; Tegla Loroupe / 28	40
2nd place, silver medalist(s)	Soviet Union: Olga Nazarkina / 2; Elena Khaliman / 18; Larisa Alekseyeva / 21; Svetlana Yepishkina / 27; (Svetlana Nesterova) / (29); (Olga Bogdanova) / (32)	68
3rd place, bronze medalist(s)	Portugal: Mónica Gama / 8; Carla Sacramento / 17; Carla Machado / 20; Luisa Diaz / 39; (Carla Azeitero) / (54); (Ana Oliveira) / (74)	84
4	Japan: Shiki Terasaki / 7; Yumi Osaki / 11; Azumi Miyazaki / 19; Akari Ito / 53; (Yasuko Kawate) / (97)	90
5	Canada: Lisa Harvey / 6; Anna Gunasekera / 13; Tamara Salomon / 15; Beni Gras / 69; (Cindy Foley) / (78); (Tonya Todd) / (100)	103
6	United States: Tina Hall / 10; Jennifer Robertson / 16; Katrina Price / 26; Tara Flynn / 52; (Cindy Davis) / (79); (Seana Arnold) / (99)	104
7	Spain: Concepción Santaren / 22; Angelica Manrique / 25; Josefina Gutierrez / 37; Maria Ortega / 41; (Julia Vaquero) / (49); (Maria Luisa Lárraga) / (66)	125
8	France: Helene Baudrand / 30; Celine Martin / 33; Corinne Gilbert / 38; Christelle Fuseau / 48; (Laurence Fontaine) / (50); (Patricia Sancey) / (57)	149
9	Morocco: Nadia Ouaziz / 24; Amina Maanaoui / 31; Seloua Ouaziz / 45; Najat Ouali / 62; (Mounia Aboulahcen) / (84)	162
10	Australia: Suzy Walsham / 9; Nicole Corbin / 12; Kate Anderson / 47; Patricia White / 107	175
11	Finland: Marja Sankelo / 35; Pia Lautala / 44; Tuula Kero / 55; Sari Veteläinen / 64; (Anne Veteläinen) / (65)	198
12	Romania: Mihaela Ciu / 23; Claudia Mirela Bortoi / 36; Nuța Olaru / 73; Aurica Buia / 93; (Simona Staicu) / (104)	225
13	United Kingdom: Andrea Whitcombe / 14; Lisa York / 58; Susan Parker / 76; Maxine Newman / 82; (Carol Hayward) / (95); (Karen Sutton) / (103)	230
14	Hungary: Éva Dóczi / 42; Anikó Javos / 43; Réka Csizi / 71; Mónika Tóth / 89; (Mónika Balint) / (105)	245
15	Norway: Hilde Hovdenak / 46; Trine Pilskog / 61; Brynhild Synstnes / 72; Siri Holtung / 91; (Hanne Pedersen) / (102); (Heidi Solstad) / (106)	270
16	Ireland: Margaret Synnott / 40; Vanessa Molloy / 77; Nathalie Davey / 83; Michelle Maloney / 94; (Rowena Lynch) / (96)	294
17	Zambia: Mary Chavula / 51; Gertrude Chikwanda / 56; Exildah Bunda / 81; Marvis Chiloshya / 113	301
18	Italy: Patrizia Ragno / 75; Mathilde Ravizza / 80; Agata Balsamo / 87; Cristina Tenaglia / 110; (Fabia Trabaldo) / (112)	352
19	Algeria: Leila Baghdad / 86; Kahla Abbou / 90; Zohra Djami Kheddim / 98; Tami Messaouda / 108; (Dounia Kara) / (111); (Naima Souag) / (114)	382

- Note: Athletes in parentheses did not score for the team result

== Participation ==
An unofficial count yields the participation of 114 athletes from 27 countries in the Junior women's race. This is in agreement with the official numbers as published.

- Algeria (6)
- Australia (4)
- Belgium (3)
- Brazil (1)
- Canada (6)
- Chinese Taipei (1)
- Finland (5)
- France (6)
- Hungary (5)
- Ireland (5)
- Italy (5)
- Japan (5)
- Kenya (4)
- Morocco (5)
- Netherlands (1)
- Norway (6)
- Portugal (6)
- Romania (5)
- Soviet Union (6)
- Spain (6)
- Sweden (1)
- Switzerland (3)
- Turkey (2)
- United Kingdom (6)
- United States (6)
- West Germany (1)
- Zambia (4)

== See also ==
- 1989 IAAF World Cross Country Championships – Senior men's race
- 1989 IAAF World Cross Country Championships – Junior men's race
- 1989 IAAF World Cross Country Championships – Senior women's race
