= 1988 IAAF World Cross Country Championships – Junior men's race =

Junior men's race at the 1988 IAAF World Cross Country Championships
- Organisers: IAAF
- Edition: 16th
- Date: March 26
- Host city: Auckland, New Zealand
- Venue: Ellerslie Racecourse
- Events: 1
- Distances: 8.031 km – Junior men
- Participation: 96 athletes from 25 nations

The Junior men's race at the 1988 IAAF World Cross Country Championships was held in Auckland, New Zealand, at the Ellerslie Racecourse on March 26, 1988. A report on the event was given in the Glasgow Herald.

Complete results, medallists, and the results of British athletes were published.

== Race results ==
=== Junior men's race (8.031 km) ===
==== Individual ====
Rank	Athlete	Country	Time
1st place, gold medalist(s)	Wilfred Kirochi	Kenya	23:25
2nd place, silver medalist(s)	Alfonce Muindi	Kenya	23:39
3rd place, bronze medalist(s)	Bedile Kibret	Ethiopia	23:41
4	Mathew Rono	Kenya	23:51
5	Thomas Makini	Kenya	23:54
6	William Koskei Chemitei	Kenya	24:03
7	Demeke Bekele	Ethiopia	24:17
8	Juan Abad	Spain	24:35
9	Noureddine Morceli	Algeria	24:45
10	Tadelle Abebe	Ethiopia	24:48
11	Zoltán Káldy	Hungary	24:52
12	Andrea Erni	Switzerland	24:56
13	Lemi Erpassa	Ethiopia	25:06
14	Todd Williams	United States	25:08
15	Fermín Cacho	Spain	25:09
16	Mariano Campal	Spain	25:10
17	Tesfayi Dadi	Ethiopia	25:12
18	Naoki Yamagata	Japan	25:18
19	Rod de Highden	Australia	25:22
20	Jun Hiratsuka	Japan	25:22
21	Hirokazu Tatsumi	Japan	25:26
22	Jesús Gálvez	Spain	25:28
23	Carlos Calado	Portugal	25:28
24	Hideyuki Matsumoto	Japan	25:31
25	Ross Wilson	New Zealand	25:32
26	Neil Panchen	United Kingdom	25:32
27	Julian Paynter	Australia	25:38
28	Richard Lindroos	New Zealand	25:38
29	Akio Ishizaki	Japan	25:40
30	Rorri Currie	Canada	25:41
31	John Myers	United States	25:43
32	Carsten Arndt	West Germany	25:45
33	Ernest Shephard	United States	25:46
34	Jason Bunston	Canada	25:47
35	Frank Hanley	Ireland	25:47
36	Sarinuto Zandonella	Italy	25:48
37	Jeffrey Pajak	United States	25:50
38	Alex Davey	Australia	25:55
39	Savino Tondo	Italy	25:55
40	Fabio Caldirolli	Italy	25:58
41	Ricardo Castaño	Spain	26:01
42	Ferhat Zaidi	Algeria	26:03
43	Shinya Kitahara	Japan	26:04
44	Dean Rose	Australia	26:10
45	Fabrizio de Vincenzi	Italy	26:10
46	Mohamed Arab Tadjer	Algeria	26:11
47	Nick Tsioros	Canada	26:13
48	Andrew Hudson	United States	26:16
49	Michael Johnston	New Zealand	26:19
50	Jeremy Forbes	New Zealand	26:21
51	Clarke Murphy	United Kingdom	26:22
52	Jon Dennis	United Kingdom	26:28
53	David Pujolar	Spain	26:30
54	Kameshwar Ravidas	India	26:31
55	Kamel Khellaf	Algeria	26:31
56	Steven Brooks	United Kingdom	26:33
57	Noel Cullen	Ireland	26:34
58	Daniel Maas	United States	26:35
59	Baltazar Sousa	Portugal	26:36
60	John Hansen	Norway	26:39
61	Chris Roberts	United Kingdom	26:40
62	Faycal Menasria	Algeria	26:42
63	Alan Lewis	Canada	26:48
64	Glen le Gros	New Zealand	26:48
65	Shyan Boodnah	Mauritius	26:48
66	Tsai Ching-Chou	Chinese Taipei	26:53
67	Greg Collier	Australia	27:01
68	Spencer Duval	United Kingdom	27:01
69	Hwang Chiu-Ping	Chinese Taipei	27:02
70	John Bowden	Canada	27:04
71	Paul Logan	Ireland	27:05
72	Fajinder Rathor	India	27:06
73	Kevin Gavin	Ireland	27:14
74	Seamus Power	Ireland	27:17
75	Eiliv Gjesdal	Norway	27:25
76	Dean Ogilvie	New Zealand	27:27
77	Julius Solheim	Norway	27:32
78	Luca Serena	Italy	28:22
79	Bishen Rouvat	Nepal	28:23
80	Rajan Khatri	Nepal	28:46
81	Ithai Luria	Israel	28:58
82	Henry Iata	Vanuatu	29:26
83	Ancel Nalau	Vanuatu	29:31
84	Uraia Koroi	Fiji	29:46
85	Brendan Matthias	Canada	29:52
86	Anand Kumar	India	29:55
87	Dhani Chowdhary	Nepal	30:22
88	Lok Rokaya	Nepal	30:35
89	Shalendra Sagar	Fiji	30:40
90	Nilesh Narayan	Fiji	30:52
91	Michael Cecil	Vanuatu	31:13
92	Usman Kutty	Fiji	31:32
93	Chandra Karki	Nepal	33:40
94	Paul Young	Western Samoa	39:10
95	Darren Young	Western Samoa	47:30
—	Cosmas Ndeti	Kenya	DQ^{†}

^{†}:Cosmas Ndeti of Kenya finished 2nd in 23:31 min, but was disqualified.

==== Teams ====
Rank	Team	Points
1st place, gold medalist(s)	Kenya: Wilfred Kirochi / 1; Alfonce Muindi / 2; Mathew Rono / 4; Thomas Makini / 5; (William Koskei Chemitei) / (6)	12
2nd place, silver medalist(s)	Ethiopia: Bedile Kibret / 3; Demeke Bekele / 7; Tadelle Abebe / 10; Lemi Erpassa / 13; (Tesfayi Dadi) / (17)	33
3rd place, bronze medalist(s)	Spain: Juan Abad / 8; Fermín Cacho / 15; Mariano Campal / 16; Jesús Gálvez / 22; (Ricardo Castaño) / (41); (David Pujolar) / (53)	61
4	Japan: Naoki Yamagata / 18; Jun Hiratsuka / 20; Hirokazu Tatsumi / 21; Hideyuki Matsumoto / 24; (Akio Ishizaki) / (29); (Shinya Kitahara) / (43)	83
5	United States: Todd Williams / 14; John Myers / 31; Ernest Shephard / 33; Jeffrey Pajak / 37; (Andrew Hudson) / (48); (Daniel Maas) / (58)	115
6	Australia: Rod de Highden / 19; Julian Paynter / 27; Alex Davey / 38; Dean Rose / 44; (Greg Collier) / (67)	128
7	New Zealand: Ross Wilson / 25; Richard Lindroos / 28; Michael Johnston / 49; Jeremy Forbes / 50; (Glen le Gros) / (64); (Dean Ogilvie) / (76)	152
8	Algeria: Noureddine Morceli / 9; Ferhat Zaidi / 42; Mohamed Arab Tadjer / 46; Kamel Khellaf / 55; (Faycal Menasria) / (62)	152
9	Italy: Sarinuto Zandonella / 36; Savino Tondo / 39; Fabio Caldirolli / 40; Fabrizio de Vincenzi / 45; (Luca Serena) / (78)	160
10	Canada: Rorri Currie / 30; Jason Bunston / 34; Nick Tsioros / 47; Alan Lewis / 63; (John Bowden) / (70); (Brendan Matthias) / (85)	174
11	United Kingdom: Neil Panchen / 26; Clarke Murphy / 51; Jon Dennis / 52; Steven Brooks / 56; (Chris Roberts) / (61); (Spencer Duval) / (68)	185
12	Ireland: Frank Hanley / 35; Noel Cullen / 57; Paul Logan / 71; Kevin Gavin / 73; (Seamus Power) / (74)	236
13	Nepal: Bishen Rouvat / 79; Rajan Khatri / 80; Dhani Chowdhary / 87; Lok Rokaya / 88; (Chandra Karki) / (93)	334
14	Fiji: Uraia Koroi / 84; Shalendra Sagar / 89; Nilesh Narayan / 90; Usman Kutty / 92	355

- Note: Athletes in parentheses did not score for the team result

== Participation ==
An unofficial count yields the participation of 96 athletes from 25 countries in the Junior men's race, one athlete less than the official number published.

- Algeria (5)
- Australia (5)
- Canada (6)
- Chinese Taipei (2)
- Ethiopia (5)
- Fiji (4)
- Hungary (1)
- India (3)
- Ireland (5)
- Israel (1)
- Italy (5)
- Japan (6)
- Kenya (6)
- Mauritius (1)
- Nepal (5)
- New Zealand (6)
- Norway (3)
- Portugal (2)
- Spain (6)
- Switzerland (1)
- United Kingdom (6)
- United States (6)
- Vanuatu (3)
- Western Samoa (2)
- West Germany (1)

== See also ==
- 1988 IAAF World Cross Country Championships – Senior men's race
- 1988 IAAF World Cross Country Championships – Senior women's race
