= Thomas Osano =

Kenyan long-distance runner (born 1970)

Medal record

Men's athletics

Representing Kenya

All-Africa Games
Gold medal – first place	1991 Cairo	10,000 m

IAAF World Half Marathon Championships
Gold medal – first place	1993 Brussels	Team

Thomas Osano (born 4 June 1970) is a Kenyan former long-distance runner who competed across track, road, and cross country running disciplines. His greatest individual honour was a 10,000 metres gold medal at the 1991 All-Africa Games. He also shared in a team gold medal with Kenya at the 1993 IAAF World Half Marathon Championships.

His best global placing was fourth at the 1991 World Championships in Athletics. Osano ran extensively in professional road races and among his victories were the Route du Vin Half Marathon, CPC Loop Den Haag, Bay to Breakers and Bolder Boulder.

== Career ==
=== Early career ===
Osano competed for Kenya at an early age and as a junior athlete he shared in a team silver at the 1987 IAAF World Cross Country Championships (led by winner Wilfred Kirochi) before returning in 1989 to finish fourth and help Kenya to the team title alongside individual medallists Kipyego Kororia and Stephenson Nyamau. He won an individual medal at the 1988 World Junior Championships in Athletics, entering the 20K run, where he was runner-up to Ethiopia's Zeleke Metaferia.

He began running in the Japanese corporate athletic system in 1990 and had much success in the country. He took a distance double at the Japan Championships in Athletics and won a second 10,000 m title in 1991. He also competed on the roads, winning the Kosa and Nobeoka 10-milers in 1990, then having successive wins in 1991 and 1992 at the All Japan Corporate Team Half Marathon Championships, Beppu-Oita Half Marathon and Hyogo Relays 10,000 m.

=== African champion and missed Olympics ===
Osano competed extensively around the world in the 1991 season. In May he had wins at the Great West Run in England, as well as at the Bay to Breakers and Bolder Boulder in the United States. At the Bislett Games in Norway in July he recorded a lifetime best of 27:28.87 minutes for the 10,000 m. Although this only brought him third at the competition, it made him the fifth fastest runner over the distance that year. He was selected to represent Kenya on the track at the 1991 World Championships in Athletics. His compatriots Moses Tanui and Richard Chelimo took the top two spots in the 10,000 m. Osano's plan was to disrupt the running of the (highly favoured) Moroccan Khalid Skah and though the tactic was successful for his teammates, Osano finished behind Skah in fourth. Two weeks later he ran the same distance at the Memorial Van Damme, taking second behind his more experienced Kenyan rival John Ngugi. He finally topped the podium in the event at the All-Africa Games later that month, beating fellow Kenyan William Koech by a narrow margin.

Osano was dominant in Japan in the first half of 1992, going unbeaten with wins including the Chiba International Cross Country and Shizuoka International. He also had repeat wins at the Bolder Boulder and Bay to Breakers in the United States. Osano finished third at the Kenyan Olympic trial race for the 10,000 m, but in a controversial decision the selectors decided instead to send Moses Tanui, who had failed to even complete the distance at that race. His Olympic debut thwarted, Osano did not compete again in 1992. He returned to action in May 1993 and headed to the American road circuit, taking wins at the Peachtree Road Race, Boilermaker Road Race and Bix 7 Road Race. Given his form, he was chosen for the Kenyan team at the 1993 IAAF World Half Marathon Championships. This was his only half marathon that year and he placed thirteenth in a time of 62:10 minutes, helping the team to victory with the help of fourth-placed Lameck Aguta. This proved to be his final international appearance.

=== Later career and decline ===
He began 1994 with a win at the Fukuoka International Cross Country and then moved on to American road races, though he was less successful on this occasion and his best results were runner-up placings at the Azalea Trail and Cherry Blossom 10-Miler. He ran in Europe in the second half of the year, but again was one place short of the top at the Dam tot Damloop, Route du Vin Half Marathon and Paris 20K. He made his marathon debut at the New York City Marathon in November, but his time of 2:18:43 hours was not impressive and left him in 14th place. He ran at shorter distances the following year and won the Crim 10-Miler, Breda Singelloop and the Brussels 10K. A runner-up finish in 60:36 minutes at the Route du Vin race was a lifetime best for the half marathon event.

Osano ran in no less than 27 road races in Europe and the United States in 1996. These took in wins at the CPC Loop Den Haag, Parelloop (a career best for the 10K run at 28:02 minutes), Bay to Breakers, Tilburg Ten Miles and Route du Vin Half Marathon. He had a similarly planned 1997, but had less success, his sole win coming in Tilburg (though he was the Falmouth Road Race runner-up). He made his second outing in the marathon in Amsterdam that November, but his run of 2:23:31 hours was even slower than his last. His performances declined in the 1998 and 1999 season and he generally placed outside the top five of his races. Despite being only 29 years old, he retired from competition.

== International competitions ==
Year	Competition	Venue	Position	Event	Notes
1987	World Cross Country Championships	Warsaw, Poland	10th	Junior race	22:55
1987	World Cross Country Championships	Warsaw, Poland	2nd	Junior team	20 pts
1988	World Junior Championships	Sudbury, Canada	2nd	20 km run	1:00:14
1989	World Cross Country Championships	Stavanger, Norway	4th	Junior race	25:33
1989	World Cross Country Championships	Stavanger, Norway	1st	Junior team	14 pts
1991	World Championships	Tokyo, Japan	4th	10,000 m	27:53.66
1991	All-Africa Games	Cairo, Egypt	1st	10,000 m	27:56.45
1993	World Half Marathon Championships	Brussels, Belgium	13th	Half marathon	1:02:10
1993	World Half Marathon Championships	Brussels, Belgium	1st	Team	3:05:40

== National titles ==
- Japan Championships in Athletics
  - 5000 m: 1990
  - 10,000 m: 1990, 1991

== Circuit wins ==
- Fukuoka International Cross Country: 1994
- Chiba International Cross Country: 1992
- Route du Vin Half Marathon: 1996
- CPC Loop Den Haag: 1996
- Breda Singelloop: 1995, 1996
- Beppu-Oita Half Marathon: 1991, 1992
- All Japan Corporate Team Half Marathon Championships: 1991, 1992
- Great West Run: 1991
- Tilburg Ten Miles: 1996, 1997
- Crim 10-Miler: 1995
- Kosa 10-miler: 1990
- Nobeoka 10-miler: 1990
- Parelloop: 1996
- Bix 7 Road Race: 1993
- Peachtree Road Race: 1993
- Boilermaker Road Race: 1993
- Bay to Breakers: 1991, 1992
- Bolder Boulder: 1991, 1992

== Personal bests ==
- 5000 metres – 13:30.40 min (1993)
- 10,000 metres – 27:28.87 min (1991)
- 10K run – 28:02 min (1996)
- Half marathon – 60:36 min (1995)
