= Bix 7 Road Race and Memorial Jazz Festival =

Bix 7 Road Race and Memorial Jazz Festival refers to a pair of related, but separate, events held on consecutive weekends:

- Bix 7 Road Race
- Bix Beiderbecke Memorial Jazz Festival
