= 1989 IAAF World Cross Country Championships – Senior women's race =

Senior women's race at the 1989 IAAF World Cross Country Championships
- Organisers: IAAF
- Edition: 17th
- Date: March 19
- Host city: Stavanger, Rogaland, Norway
- Venue: Scanvest Ring
- Events: 1
- Distances: 6 km – Senior women
- Participation: 120 athletes from 27 nations

The Senior women's race at the 1989 IAAF World Cross Country Championships was held in Stavanger, Norway, at the Scanvest Ring on March 19, 1989. A report on the event was given in the Glasgow Herald.

Complete results, medallists, and the results of British athletes were published.

== Race results ==
=== Senior women's race (6 km) ===
==== Individual ====
Rank	Athlete	Country	Time
1st place, gold medalist(s)	Annette Sergent	France	22:27
2nd place, silver medalist(s)	Nadezhda Stepanova	Soviet Union	22:34
3rd place, bronze medalist(s)	Lynn Williams	Canada	22:41
4	Jane Ngotho	Kenya	22:57
5	Jackie Perkins	Australia	22:59
6	Lynn Jennings	United States	22:59
7	Jill Hunter	United Kingdom	23:00
8	Véronique Collard	Belgium	23:01
9	Yelena Romanova	Soviet Union	23:02
10	Maria Lelut	France	23:03
11	Luchia Yeshak	Ethiopia	23:04
12	Conceição Ferreira	Portugal	23:13
13	Angie Pain	United Kingdom	23:15
14	Maree McDonagh	Australia	23:17
15	Adanech Erkulo	Ethiopia	23:19
16	Margaret Groos	United States	23:20
17	Martine Fays	France	23:21
18	Albertina Dias	Portugal	23:22
19	Albertina Machado	Portugal	23:27
20	Natalya Sorokivskaya	Soviet Union	23:27
21	Carla Borovicka	United States	23:28
22	Jeanne-Marie Pipoz	Switzerland	23:28
23	Derartu Tulu	Ethiopia	23:29
24	Tuija Toivonen	Finland	23:32
25	Annette Hand	United States	23:32
26	Susan Hobson	Australia	23:35
27	Regina Chistyakova	Soviet Union	23:36
28	Alison Wyeth	United Kingdom	23:43
29	Sabrina Dornhoefer	United States	23:45
30	Susan Stone	Canada	23:47
31	Kumi Araki	Japan	23:47
32	Marie-Pierre Duros	France	23:48
33	Christine Kennedy	Ireland	23:49
34	Nelly Aerts	Belgium	23:49
35	Ana Moreira	Portugal	23:50
36	Christine Sørum	Norway	23:51
37	Maria van Gestel	Belgium	23:53
38	Akemi Matsuno	Japan	23:55
39	Dolores Rizo	Spain	23:57
40	Martha Ernstdóttir	Iceland	24:00
41	Estela Estévez	Spain	24:00
42	Ana Correia	Portugal	24:01
43	Lesley Graham	New Zealand	24:01
44	Lucy Smith	Canada	24:03
45	Allison Rabour	Italy	24:04
46	Felicidade Sena	Portugal	24:05
47	Kristina Ljungberg	Sweden	24:05
48	Lesley Morton	New Zealand	24:09
49	Tigist Moreda	Ethiopia	24:10
50	Rita de Jesús	Brazil	24:10
51	Sue Dilnot	United Kingdom	24:11
52	Satu Levelä	Finland	24:11
53	Patricia Demilly	France	24:11
54	Rosanna Munerotto	Italy	24:12
55	Mary O'Connor	New Zealand	24:13
56	Jill Purola	Canada	24:13
57	Sadako Hayakawa	Japan	24:13
58	Carmen Díaz	Spain	24:14
59	Daria Nauer	Switzerland	24:14
60	Maiken Sørum	Norway	24:14
61	Debbie Elsmore	New Zealand	24:15
62	Sally Ellis	United Kingdom	24:16
63	Sachiko Yamashita	Japan	24:17
64	Catherine Rooney	Ireland	24:17
65	Nicki Morris	United Kingdom	24:19
66	Carlien Harms	Netherlands	24:20
67	Natalya Artyomova	Soviet Union	24:21
68	Joke Kleyweg	Netherlands	24:22
69	Tatyana Pozdnyakova	Soviet Union	24:23
70	Carita Sunell	Finland	24:23
71	Anna Villani	Italy	24:26
72	Laura Faccio	Italy	24:29
73	Kirsi Rauta	Finland	24:31
74	Tsugumi Fukuyama	Japan	24:32
75	Getenesh Urge	Ethiopia	24:34
76	Catherina McKiernan	Ireland	24:36
77	Jackie Goodman	New Zealand	24:38
78	Roisin Smyth	Ireland	24:40
79	Isabella Moretti	Switzerland	24:40
80	Kirsi Valasti	Finland	24:40
81	Marjan Freriks	Netherlands	24:43
82	Sandra Anschuetz	Canada	24:44
83	Kaisa Siitonen	Finland	24:47
84	Lisbeth Crafach	Denmark	24:50
85	Joy Terry	Australia	24:51
86	Shelly Steely	United States	24:57
87	Nives Curti	Italy	25:02
88	Jenny Lund	Australia	25:05
89	Barbara Moore	New Zealand	25:09
90	Hilde Marit Fjelltveit	Norway	25:10
91	Carmen Brunet	Spain	25:11
92	Jytte Pedersen	Denmark	25:11
93	Rosario Murcia	France	25:12
94	Cathrine Bendz	Norway	25:14
95	Rosa Perez	Spain	25:16
96	Tanja Merchiers	Belgium	25:19
97	Valerie Collins	Ireland	25:21
98	Grethe Fosse	Norway	25:22
99	Tove Schultz	Denmark	25:23
100	Anja de Brabant	Belgium	25:24
101	Monica Conti	Italy	25:24
102	Natsulov Kawamoto	Japan	25:26
103	Inga Nielsen	Denmark	25:47
104	Anita Nielsen	Denmark	25:53
105	May Allison	Canada	25:56
106	Bente Moe	Norway	26:02
107	Ulla Nielsen	Denmark	26:06
108	Cleuza Irineu	Brazil	26:16
109	Fernanda Marques	Portugal	26:22
110	Maria Belarmino	Brazil	26:34
111	Mazal Shalom	Israel	27:03
112	Katerina Pratsi	Cyprus	27:07
113	Frida Run Thordardóttir	Iceland	27:22
114	Rizoneide Vanderley	Brazil	27:26
115	Maryse Justin	Mauritius	27:30
116	Margret Brynjolfsdóttir	Iceland	28:30
117	Corneila Melis	Aruba	29:18
118	Hulda Palsdóttír	Iceland	29:48
—	Ana Isabel Alonso	Spain	DNF
—	Carolyn Schuwalov	Australia	DNF

==== Teams ====
Rank	Team	Points
1st place, gold medalist(s)	Soviet Union: Nadezhda Stepanova / 2; Yelena Romanova / 9; Natalya Sorokivskaya / 20; Regina Chistyakova / 27; (Natalya Artyomova) / (67); (Tatyana Pozdnyakova) / (69)	58
2nd place, silver medalist(s)	France: Annette Sergent / 1; Maria Lelut / 10; Martine Fays / 17; Marie-Pierre Duros / 32; (Patricia Demilly) / (53); (Rosario Murcia) / (93)	60
3rd place, bronze medalist(s)	United States: Lynn Jennings / 6; Margaret Groos / 16; Carla Borovicka / 21; Annette Hand / 25; (Sabrina Dornhoefer) / (29); (Shelly Steely) / (86)	68
4	Portugal: Conceição Ferreira / 12; Albertina Dias / 18; Albertina Machado / 19; Ana Moreira / 35; (Ana Correia) / (42); (Felicidade Sena) / (46); (Fernanda Marques) / (109)	84
5	Ethiopia: Luchia Yeshak / 11; Adanech Erkulo / 15; Derartu Tulu / 23; Tigist Moreda / 49; (Getenesh Urge) / (75)	98
6	United Kingdom: Jill Hunter / 7; Angie Pain / 13; Alison Wyeth / 28; Sue Dilnot / 51; (Sally Ellis) / (62); (Nicki Morris) / (65)	99
7	Australia: Jackie Perkins / 5; Maree McDonagh / 14; Susan Hobson / 26; Joy Terry / 85; (Jenny Lund) / (88); (Carolyn Schuwalov) / (DNF)	130
8	Canada: Lynn Williams / 3; Susan Stone / 30; Lucy Smith / 44; Jill Purola / 56; (Sandra Anschuetz) / (82); (May Allison) / (105)	133
9	Belgium: Véronique Collard / 8; Nelly Aerts / 34; Maria van Gestel / 37; Tanja Merchiers / 96; (Anja de Brabant) / (100)	175
10	Japan: Kumi Araki / 31; Akemi Matsuno / 38; Sadako Hayakawa / 57; Sachiko Yamashita / 63; (Tsugumi Fukuyama) / (74); (Natsulov Kawamoto) / (102)	189
11	New Zealand: Lesley Graham / 43; Lesley Morton / 48; Mary O'Connor / 55; Debbie Elsmore / 61; (Jackie Goodman) / (77); (Barbara Moore) / (89)	207
12	Finland: Tuija Toivonen / 24; Satu Levelä / 52; Carita Sunell / 70; Kirsi Rauta / 73; (Kirsi Valasti) / (80); (Kaisa Siitonen) / (83)	219
13	Spain: Dolores Rizo / 39; Estela Estévez / 41; Carmen Díaz / 58; Carmen Brunet / 91; (Rosa Perez) / (95); (Ana Isabel Alonso) / (DNF)	229
14	Italy: Allison Rabour / 45; Rosanna Munerotto / 54; Anna Villani / 71; Laura Faccio / 72; (Nives Curti) / (87); (Monica Conti) / (101)	242
15	Ireland: Christine Kennedy / 33; Catherine Rooney / 64; Catherina McKiernan / 76; Roisin Smyth / 78; (Valerie Collins) / (97)	251
16	Norway: Christine Sørum / 36; Maiken Sørum / 60; Hilde Marit Fjelltveit / 90; Cathrine Bendz / 94; (Grethe Fosse) / (98); (Bente Moe) / (106)	280
17	Denmark: Lisbeth Crafach / 84; Jytte Pedersen / 92; Tove Schultz / 99; Inga Nielsen / 103; (Anita Nielsen) / (104); (Ulla Nielsen) / (107)	378
18	Brazil: Rita de Jesús / 50; Cleuza Irineu / 108; Maria Belarmino / 110; Rizoneide Vanderley / 114	382
19	Iceland: Martha Ernstdóttir / 40; Frida Run Thordardóttir / 113; Margret Brynjolfsdóttir / 116; Hulda Palsdóttír / 118	387

- Note: Athletes in parentheses did not score for the team result

== Participation ==
An unofficial count yields the participation of 120 athletes from 27 countries in the Senior women's race. This is in agreement with the official numbers as published.

- Aruba (1)
- Australia (6)
- Belgium (5)
- Brazil (4)
- Canada (6)
- Cyprus (1)
- Denmark (6)
- Ethiopia (5)
- Finland (6)
- France (6)
- Iceland (4)
- Ireland (5)
- Israel (1)
- Italy (6)
- Japan (6)
- Kenya (1)
- Mauritius (1)
- Netherlands (3)
- New Zealand (6)
- Norway (6)
- Portugal (7)
- Soviet Union (6)
- Spain (6)
- Sweden (1)
- Switzerland (3)
- United Kingdom (6)
- United States (6)

== See also ==
- 1989 IAAF World Cross Country Championships – Senior men's race
- 1989 IAAF World Cross Country Championships – Junior men's race
- 1989 IAAF World Cross Country Championships – Junior women's race
