= Galyamov =

Galyamov (Russian: Галямов, Галлямов), sometimes transliterated as Galliamov or Galiamov, is a Russian-language surname.

The female form is Galyamova (Russian: Галямова, Галлямова), sometimes transliterated as Galliamova or Galiamova.

== People ==
- Aleksandr Galliamov (born 1999), Russian pair skater
- Alisa Galliamova (born 1972), Russian chess player
- Marat Galyamov (born 1997), Russian footballer
- Nadezhda Galyamova (born 1959), Russian long-distance runner
