= 1988 World Junior Championships in Athletics – Men's 3000 metres steeplechase =

Sports event in Canada

The men's 3000 metres steeplechase event at the 1988 World Junior Championships in Athletics was held in Sudbury, Ontario, Canada, at Laurentian University Stadium on 29 and 31 July.

== Medalists ==
Gold	William Chemitei; Kenya
Silver	Matthew Birir; Kenya
Bronze	Arto Kuusisto; Finland

== Results ==
=== Final ===
31 July

Rank	Name	Nationality	Time	Notes
1st place, gold medalist(s)	William Chemitei	Kenya	8:41.61	
2nd place, silver medalist(s)	Matthew Birir	Kenya	8:44.54	
3rd place, bronze medalist(s)	Arto Kuusisto	Finland	8:46.42	
4	Wander Moura	Brazil	8:48.16	
5	Leonid Shvetsov	Soviet Union	8:51.01	
6	Savino Tondo	Italy	8:56.66	
7	Burgas Yordanov	Bulgaria	9:00.65	
8	Kim Bauermeister	West Germany	9:01.19	
9	Sérgio Ribeiro	Brazil	9:01.97	
10	Rorri Currie	Canada	9:04.71	
11	Horst Vangermain	East Germany	9:04.96	
12	Jason Martin	United States	9:04.96	
13	Simretu Alemayehu	Ethiopia	9:05.56	
14	Markku Kyyrönen	Finland	9:06.57	
15	Vittorio Formenti	Italy	9:08.04	

=== Heats ===
29 July

==== Heat 1 ====
Rank	Name	Nationality	Time	Notes
1	Vittorio Formenti	Italy	9:03.05	Q
2	Simretu Alemayehu	Ethiopia	9:03.97	Q
3	Arto Kuusisto	Finland	9:07.23	Q
4	Leonid Shvetsov	Soviet Union	9:12.01	Q
5	Spencer Duval	United Kingdom	9:14.65	
6	Romain Berthier	France	9:26.20	
7	Chad Findley	United States	9:36.40	
8	Geir Skari	Norway	9:40.85	
9	Hiroyuki Itabashi	Japan	9:51.29	
10	Mathevan Maran	Singapore	10:05.18	
	Oto Oreško	Czechoslovakia	DNF	

==== Heat 2 ====
Rank	Name	Nationality	Time	Notes
1	Matthew Birir	Kenya	8:54.51	Q
2	Wander Moura	Brazil	9:05.62	Q
3	Horst Vangermain	East Germany	9:07.73	Q
4	Sérgio Ribeiro	Brazil	9:08.74	Q
5	Rorri Currie	Canada	9:08.76	q
6	Bruno Saulnier	France	9:14.44	
7	Michael Buchleitner	Austria	9:18.29	
8	Greg Collier	Australia	9:19.19	
9	Lars Richter	West Germany	9:31.12	
10	Michael Johnston	New Zealand	9:39.46	
11	Juan Carlos Salcedo	Spain	9:56.71	

==== Heat 3 ====
Rank	Name	Nationality	Time	Notes
1	William Chemitei	Kenya	8:53.89	Q
2	Savino Tondo	Italy	9:04.59	Q
3	Burgas Yordanov	Bulgaria	9:05.40	Q
4	Kim Bauermeister	West Germany	9:07.77	Q
5	Jason Martin	United States	9:10.60	q
6	Markku Kyyrönen	Finland	9:12.14	q
7	Carlos Pinto	Portugal	9:22.51	
8	Douglas Rountree	New Zealand	9:24.65	
9	Maciej Pawlowski	Poland	9:35.14	
10	Alfredo Nuñez	Dominican Republic	9:37.45	
11	David Paul	Canada	9:44.81	

== Participation ==
According to an unofficial count, 33 athletes from 24 countries participated in the event.

- Australia (1)
- Austria (1)
- Brazil (2)
- Bulgaria (1)
- Canada (2)
- Czechoslovakia (1)
- Dominican Republic (1)
- East Germany (1)
- Ethiopia (1)
- Finland (2)
- France (2)
- Italy (2)
- Japan (1)
- Kenya (2)
- New Zealand (2)
- Norway (1)
- Poland (1)
- Portugal (1)
- Singapore (1)
- Soviet Union (1)
- Spain (1)
- United Kingdom (1)
- United States (2)
- West Germany (2)
