= William Chemitei =

Kenyan middle-distance runner

Medal record

Men's athletics

Representing Kenya

World Junior Championships
Gold medal – first place	1988 Sudbury	3000 m steeplechase

World Cross Country Championships
Gold medal – first place	1988 Auckland	Junior team
Gold medal – first place	1989 Stavanger	Junior team
Silver medal – second place	1987 Warsaw	Junior team

William Koskei Chemitei (born 29 December 1970) is a former Kenyan middle-distance runner who won a gold medal at the 1988 World Junior Championships in Sudbury in the 3000 metres steeplechase event.

He represented his country three times in the junior race at the IAAF World Cross Country Championships from 1987 to 1989, finishing in the top six on each occasion and sharing in the team gold in 1988 and 1989.

== Personal life ==
His son Matthew Kosgei is a steeplechase runner.

== International competitions ==
Representing Kenya
Year	Competition	Venue	Position	Event	Notes
1987	World Cross Country Championships	Warsaw, Poland	4th	Junior race	22:27
1987	World Cross Country Championships	Warsaw, Poland	2nd	Junior team	20 pts
1988	IAAF World Cross Country Championships	Auckland, New Zealand	6th	Junior race	24:03
1988	IAAF World Cross Country Championships	Auckland, New Zealand	1st	Junior team	12 pts
1988	World Junior Championships	Sudbury, Canada	1st	3000 m s'chase	8:41.61
1989	World Cross Country Championships	Stavanger, Norway	5th	Junior race	25:36
1989	World Cross Country Championships	Stavanger, Norway	1st	Junior team	14 pts
