= Silas Kipruto =

Kenyan long-distance runner (born 1984)

Silas Kipruto Semetei (born 26 September 1984) is a Kenyan professional long-distance runner who specializes in the half marathon and 10K run events, with personal bests of 59:39 minutes and 27:28 minutes respectively.

He finished seventh at the 2008 World Athletics Final and eighth at the 2009 World Athletics Final, and also fifth in the 3000 metres at the 2009 World Athletics Final.

His personal best times are 7:32.25 minutes in the 3000 metres, achieved in September 2009 in Rieti; 13:02.86 minutes in the 5000 metres, achieved in June 2008 in Berlin; and 27:26.31 minutes in the 10,000 metres, achieved in May 2008 in Hengelo.

Kipruto took second place at the 2010 Stramilano Half Marathon, running a sub-60 minute time of 59:39 to finish just behind Moses Mosop. He again broke the 60-minute mark later that year, finishing third at the Lille Half Marathon in 59:52. He was fourth at the Delhi Half Marathon in November, although he was some way off Geoffrey Mutai who won the race. At the start of 2011 he was fifth at the Giro Media Blenio. Kipruto was second at that year's Nice Half Marathon with a season's best run of 1:01:11 hours. He began 2012 with a runner-up performance behind Ayele Abshero at the Yangzhou Jianzhen International Half Marathon. He was third at that year's Delhi Half Marathon and placed fifth at both the Falmouth Road Race and the BOClassic.

Kipruto was runner-up at the Berlin Half Marathon, but came fourth in Yangzhou. Over 10K that year, he won in Tripoli and Jakarta, then came in second place on behind Micah Kogo in the Beach to Beacon 10K race in Cape Elizabeth, Maine with a season's best of 28:09 minutes. He was also runner-up over 7 miles at the Bix 7 Road Race. He entered as one of the favourites for the Marseille-Cassis Classique Internationale, but dropped out during the race's difficult uphill section.
