= Maxine Newman =

British middle-distance runner

Personal information
- Nationality: British
- Born: 15 December 1970 (age 55)

Sport
- Sport: Middle-distance running
- Event: 1500 metres
- Club: Leicester Coritanian AC

Maxine Claire Baker (née Newman, born 15 December 1970) is an English former middle-distance runner. She represented Great Britain in the 1500 metres at the 1992 Barcelona Olympics.

== Career ==
Born in Leicester, Newman was a member of OWLS AC Leicester and later Coventry Godiva Harriers. She won the English Schools intermediate 1500m title in 1987 (4:33.3) and the English Schools senior 1500m title in 1989 (4:17.1), and went on to finish sixth in the 1500m final at the 1989 European Junior Championships in 4:16.51.

Newman ran her 1500 metres best of 4:10.07 on 28 June 1992, when finishing fifth at the AAA Championships/Olympic trials, a time that was just inside the Olympic qualifying standard of 4:10.20. With two of the athletes ahead of her (Yvonne Murray and Liz McColgan) concentrating on other events, she was selected to represent Great Britain in the women's 1500 metres at the 1992 Barcelona Olympics.

== International competitions ==
Year	Competition	Venue	Position	Event	Notes
1989	European Junior Championships	Varaždin, Yugoslavia	6th	1500 m	4:16.51
1992	Olympic Games	Barcelona, Spain	25th (heats)	1500 m	4:15.16
