= 1986 World Junior Championships in Athletics – Men's 1500 metres =

The men's 1500 metres event at the 1986 World Junior Championships in Athletics was held in Athens, Greece, at Olympic Stadium on 19 and 20 July.

== Medalists ==
Gold	Wilfred Kirochi; Kenya
Silver	Peter Rono; Kenya
Bronze	Johan Boakes; United Kingdom

== Results ==
=== Final ===
20 July

Rank	Name	Nationality	Time	Notes
1st place, gold medalist(s)	Wilfred Kirochi	Kenya	3:44.62	
2nd place, silver medalist(s)	Peter Rono	Kenya	3:45.52	
3rd place, bronze medalist(s)	Johan Boakes	United Kingdom	3:45.80	
4	Rüdiger Horn	East Germany	3:46.77	
5	David Sharpe	United Kingdom	3:46.94	
6	Radim Kuncický	Czechoslovakia	3:47.36	
7	Germán Beltrán	Venezuela	3:47.75	
8	Ángel Fariña	Spain	3:48.39	
9	Tadelle Abebe	Ethiopia	3:49.08	
10	Sergey Melnikov	Soviet Union	3:49.81	
11	Michael Radziwinski	West Germany	3:49.95	
12	Mark Deady	United States	3:50.69	
13	Jari Venäläinen	Finland	3:52.03	
14	Aléxandros Gotzis	Greece	3:53.94	
15	Clodoaldo do Carmo	Brazil	3:56.10	

=== Heats ===
19 July

==== Heat 1 ====
Rank	Name	Nationality	Time	Notes
1	Rüdiger Horn	East Germany	3:46.42	Q
2	Johan Boakes	United Kingdom	3:46.90	Q
3	Radim Kuncický	Czechoslovakia	3:46.95	Q
4	Tadelle Abebe	Ethiopia	3:47.39	q
5	Richard Birembaux	France	3:48.65	
6	Atsushi Ogino	Japan	3:48.99	
7	Brahim El-Ghazali	Morocco	3:50.91	
8	Ado Maude	Nigeria	3:51.88	
9	Andrey Usachov	Soviet Union	3:51.98	
10	Matthew Hopkins	United States	3:52.43	
11	Stein Engevold	Norway	4:00.10	
12	Momouni Apiou	Côte d'Ivoire	4:00.19	
13	Lucien Simon	Antigua and Barbuda	4:07.26	
14	Jamal Ali Al-Hakim	North Yemen	4:14.48	

==== Heat 2 ====
Rank	Name	Nationality	Time	Notes
1	Peter Rono	Kenya	3:46.31	Q
2	David Sharpe	United Kingdom	3:46.80	Q
3	Jari Venäläinen	Finland	3:47.04	Q
4	Michael Radziwinski	West Germany	3:47.23	q
5	Eyob Muller	Netherlands	3:51.77	
6	Henry Klassen	Canada	3:54.73	
7	Konstadínos Tsoumanis	Greece	3:56.11	
8	Joseph Sean	Trinidad and Tobago	3:59.14	
9	Omar Mahabeh	Djibouti	4:07.24	
10	Saravanan Arjunan	Singapore	4:07.31	
11	Mohamed Ould Khayar	Mauritania	4:18.24	
12	Aboukar Adani	Somalia	4:19.17	

==== Heat 3 ====
Rank	Name	Nationality	Time	Notes
1	Wilfred Kirochi	Kenya	3:47.24	Q
2	Sergey Melnikov	Soviet Union	3:49.40	Q
3	Germán Beltrán	Venezuela	3:49.45	Q
4	Gino Van Geyte	Belgium	3:50.24	
5	John Ndhlovu	Zimbabwe	3:50.59	
6	Karel Milkowski	Poland	3:51.85	
7	Honest Umbe	Tanzania	3:52.55	
8	Dragan Dukanac	Yugoslavia	3:53.21	
9	Bouazza Noualla	Algeria	3:53.25	
10	Jan Jonsson	Sweden	3:53.37	
11	Herder Vázquez	Colombia	3:55.21	
12	M.Ibrahim Hatem	Sudan	4:02.24	
13	Kazanga Makok	Zaire	4:15.77	
14	Eversley Linley	Saint Vincent and the Grenadines	4:23.26	

==== Heat 4 ====
Rank	Name	Nationality	Time	Notes
1	Mark Deady	United States	3:46.97	Q
2	Aléxandros Gotzis	Greece	3:47.26	Q
3	Ángel Fariña	Spain	3:47.97	Q
4	Clodoaldo do Carmo	Brazil	3:48.45	q
5	Keiichiro Nakamura	Japan	3:49.63	
6	Richard Charette	Canada	3:50.45	
7	Pascal Meirlaen	Belgium	3:52.61	
8	Gosham Springer	Grenada	3:53.99	
9	Abdul Nasser Jouma	Bahrain	3:55.30	
10	Eduardo Cabrera	Mexico	3:55.51	
11	Joseph Antoun	Sudan	3:59.54	
12	Sergio Iván Gómez	Guatemala	4:01.76	
13	Steinn Jóhannsson	Iceland	4:07.17	
14	Ndaona Musuma	Malawi	4:15.67	

== Participation ==
According to an unofficial count, 54 athletes from 45 countries participated in the event.

- Algeria (1)
- Antigua and Barbuda (1)
- Bahrain (1)
- Belgium (2)
- Brazil (1)
- Canada (2)
- Colombia (1)
- Côte d'Ivoire (1)
- Czechoslovakia (1)
- Djibouti (1)
- East Germany (1)
- Ethiopia (1)
- Finland (1)
- France (1)
- Greece (2)
- Grenada (1)
- Guatemala (1)
- Iceland (1)
- Japan (2)
- Kenya (2)
- Malawi (1)
- Mauritania (1)
- Mexico (1)
- Morocco (1)
- Netherlands (1)
- Nigeria (1)
- North Yemen (1)
- Norway (1)
- Poland (1)
- Saint Vincent and the Grenadines (1)
- Singapore (1)
- Somalia (1)
- Soviet Union (2)
- Spain (1)
- Sudan (2)
- Sweden (1)
- Tanzania (1)
- Trinidad and Tobago (1)
- United Kingdom (2)
- United States (2)
- Venezuela (1)
- West Germany (1)
- Yugoslavia (1)
- Zaire (1)
- Zimbabwe (1)
