= Natalya Sorokivskaya =

Medal record

Women's athletics

Representing the Soviet Union

IAAF World Cross Country Championships
Gold medal – first place	1989 Stavanger	Team
Bronze medal – third place	1987 Warsaw	Team
Bronze medal – third place	1991 Antwerp	Team

IAAF World Cup
Bronze medal – third place	1989 Barcelona	10,000 m

Natalya Sorokivskaya (Russian: Наталья Сорокивская; born 23 July 1962) is a Kazakhstani female former long-distance runner who competed for the Soviet Union and later Kazakhstan. She competed in track, road and cross country running disciplines. She holds the Kazakhstani national records from 3000 metres to the 10K run and also the half marathon record.

She was a seven-time participant at the IAAF World Cross Country Championships between 1987 and 1994, with her best performance being on her debut when she came tenth. She was part of the winning Soviet women's team in 1989, alongside Nadezhda Stepanova, Yelena Romanova, and Regina Chistyakova. She also won team bronze medals in 1987 and 1991.

Sorokivskaya won two 10,000 metres bronze medals on the track for the Soviet Union, first at the 1987 European Cup and then at the 1989 IAAF World Cup. She was twice national champion on the track, taking the 10,000 m at the 1989 Soviet Athletics Championships and the 5000 metres title at the 1990 Soviet Indoor Athletics Championships.

She had her first national podium finish in 1986, coming third over 5000 m and represented the Soviet Union at the 1986 Goodwill Games as a result. She took a team gold medal at the IAAF World Road Relay Championships in 1994. She also represented the Soviet women's team at the International Chiba Ekiden in 1988 and 1991, the Yokohama International Women's Ekiden in 1990, 1991, 1992 and 1995, and the Beijing International Women's Ekiden in 1992 and 1994. On the professional circuit, she was runner-up at the Egmond Half Marathon, Tilburg 10K and Eurocross in 1993, runner-up at the 4 Mijl van Groningen and Tilburg 5-miler in 1995, and third-placer at the 1995 Frankfurt Half Marathon.

== International competitions ==
Year	Competition	Venue	Position	Event	Notes
1986	Goodwill Games	Moscow, Soviet Union	11th	5000 m	15:47.73
1987	World Cross Country Championships	Warsaw, Poland	10th	Senior race	17:13
1987	World Cross Country Championships	Warsaw, Poland	3rd	Team	55 pts
1987	European Cup	Prague, Czechoslovakia	3rd	10,000 m	33:10.18
1989	World Cross Country Championships	Stavanger, Norway	20th	Senior race	23:27
1989	World Cross Country Championships	Stavanger, Norway	1st	Team	58 pts
1989	European Cup	Gateshead, United Kingdom	4th	10,000 m	33:10.86
1989	IAAF World Cup	Barcelona, Spain	3rd	10,000 m	32:15.53
1990	World Cross Country Championships	Aix-les-Bains, France	29th	Senior race	20:05
1991	World Cross Country Championships	Antwerp, Belgium	11th	Senior race	20:57
1991	World Cross Country Championships	Antwerp, Belgium	3rd	Team	48 pts
1991	European Cup	Frankfurt, Germany	6th	10,000 m	32:52.50
1992	World Cross Country Championships	Boston, United States	23rd	Senior race	22:04
1992	World Cross Country Championships	Boston, United States	15th	Team	256 pts
1993	World Cross Country Championships	Amorebieta, Spain	31st	Senior race	20:50
1993	World Cross Country Championships	Amorebieta, Spain	17th	Team	330 pts
1994	World Cross Country Championships	Budapest, Hungary	72nd	Senior race	22:01
1994	World Cross Country Championships	Budapest, Hungary	22nd	Team	399 pts
1994	World Half Marathon Championships	Oslo, Norway	38th	Half marathon	1:13:41
1994	World Half Marathon Championships	Oslo, Norway	13th	Team	3:43:31
1994	IAAF World Road Relay Championships	Litochoro, Greece	2nd (leg)	10 km	33:21
1994	IAAF World Road Relay Championships	Litochoro, Greece	1st	Team	2:17:19

== National titles ==
- Soviet Athletics Championships
  - 10,000 m: 1989
- Soviet Indoor Athletics Championships
  - 5000 m: 1990
