= 1988 World Junior Championships in Athletics – Men's 1500 metres =

The men's 1500 metres event at the 1988 World Junior Championships in Athletics was held in Sudbury, Ontario, Canada, at Laurentian University Stadium on 30 and 31 July.

== Medalists ==
Gold	Wilfred Kirochi; Kenya
Silver	Noureddine Morceli; Algeria
Bronze	Fermín Cacho; Spain

== Results ==
=== Final ===
31 July

Rank	Name	Nationality	Time	Notes
1st place, gold medalist(s)	Wilfred Kirochi	Kenya	3:46.52	
2nd place, silver medalist(s)	Noureddine Morceli	Algeria	3:46.93	
3rd place, bronze medalist(s)	Fermín Cacho	Spain	3:47.31	
4	Fransua Woldemarian	Ethiopia	3:47.63	
5	Jason Pyrah	United States	3:47.94	
6	Atoi Boru	Kenya	3:47.97	
7	Mohamed Suleiman	Qatar	3:48.27	
8	Christophe Impens	Belgium	3:51.73	
9	Andrea Cellai	Italy	3:52.00	
10	Rens Eising	Netherlands	3:52.16	
11	Andrea Erni	Switzerland	3:52.49	
12	Hiroshi Fukaya	Japan	3:53.94	
13	Hirokazu Tatsumi	Japan	3:55.61	
14	Andreas Nellesen	West Germany	3:58.22	
	Paul Vandegrift	United States	DNF	

=== Heats ===
30 July

==== Heat 1 ====
Rank	Name	Nationality	Time	Notes
1	Noureddine Morceli	Algeria	3:46.79	Q
2	Fransua Woldemarian	Ethiopia	3:47.34	Q
3	Andrea Erni	Switzerland	3:48.65	Q
4	Rens Eising	Netherlands	3:48.83	Q
5	Phillimon Hanneck	Zimbabwe	3:49.10	
6	Spencer Punter	Canada	3:50.96	
7	Tommy Gjølga	Norway	3:51.30	
8	Siegfried Sacher	East Germany	3:51.93	
9	Greg Collier	Australia	3:54.13	
10	Alessandro Cellai	Italy	3:56.75	
11	Mohamed Shawki Abdullah	Qatar	3:57.51	
12	Lyle Tenfingers	American Samoa	4:44.58	

==== Heat 2 ====
Rank	Name	Nationality	Time	Notes
1	Atoi Boru	Kenya	3:47.17	Q
2	Paul Vandegrift	United States	3:47.63	Q
3	Andreas Nellesen	West Germany	3:47.81	Q
4	Andrea Cellai	Italy	3:47.82	Q
5	Hiroshi Fukaya	Japan	3:47.99	q
6	Simon Brown	United Kingdom	3:49.45	
7	Billy Mullaney	Ireland	3:51.01	
8	Tor Øivind Ødegård	Norway	3:52.71	
9	Artur Zalewski	Poland	3:55.16	
10	Robin Cianca	Panama	4:09.01	
11	Martin Forde	Barbados	4:15.09	
12	Chérif Baba Aïdara	Mauritania	4:41.49	

==== Heat 3 ====
Rank	Name	Nationality	Time	Notes
1	Wilfred Kirochi	Kenya	3:43.51	Q
2	Mohamed Suleiman	Qatar	3:43.85	Q
3	Fermín Cacho	Spain	3:44.04	Q
4	Christophe Impens	Belgium	3:44.29	Q
5	Hirokazu Tatsumi	Japan	3:44.77	q
6	Jason Pyrah	United States	3:47.99	q
7	Bernhard Richter	Austria	3:49.75	
8	Brendan Matthias	Canada	3:51.74	
9	Paulo Estiveira	Portugal	3:59.30	
10	Urs Kindle	Liechtenstein	4:09.24	
11	Bernard Henry	Saint Lucia	4:12.87	
12	Nioka Pululu	Zaire	4:13.00	

== Participation ==
According to an unofficial count, 36 athletes from 29 countries participated in the event.

- Algeria (1)
- American Samoa (1)
- Australia (1)
- Austria (1)
- Barbados (1)
- Belgium (1)
- Canada (2)
- East Germany (1)
- Ethiopia (1)
- Ireland (1)
- Italy (2)
- Japan (2)
- Kenya (2)
- Liechtenstein (1)
- Mauritania (1)
- Netherlands (1)
- Norway (2)
- Panama (1)
- Poland (1)
- Portugal (1)
- Qatar (2)
- Saint Lucia (1)
- Spain (1)
- Switzerland (1)
- United Kingdom (1)
- United States (2)
- West Germany (1)
- Zaire (1)
- Zimbabwe (1)
