= Bix Beiderbecke Memorial Jazz Festival =

Festival held in Davenport, Iowa, US

Bix Jazz Memorial Festival
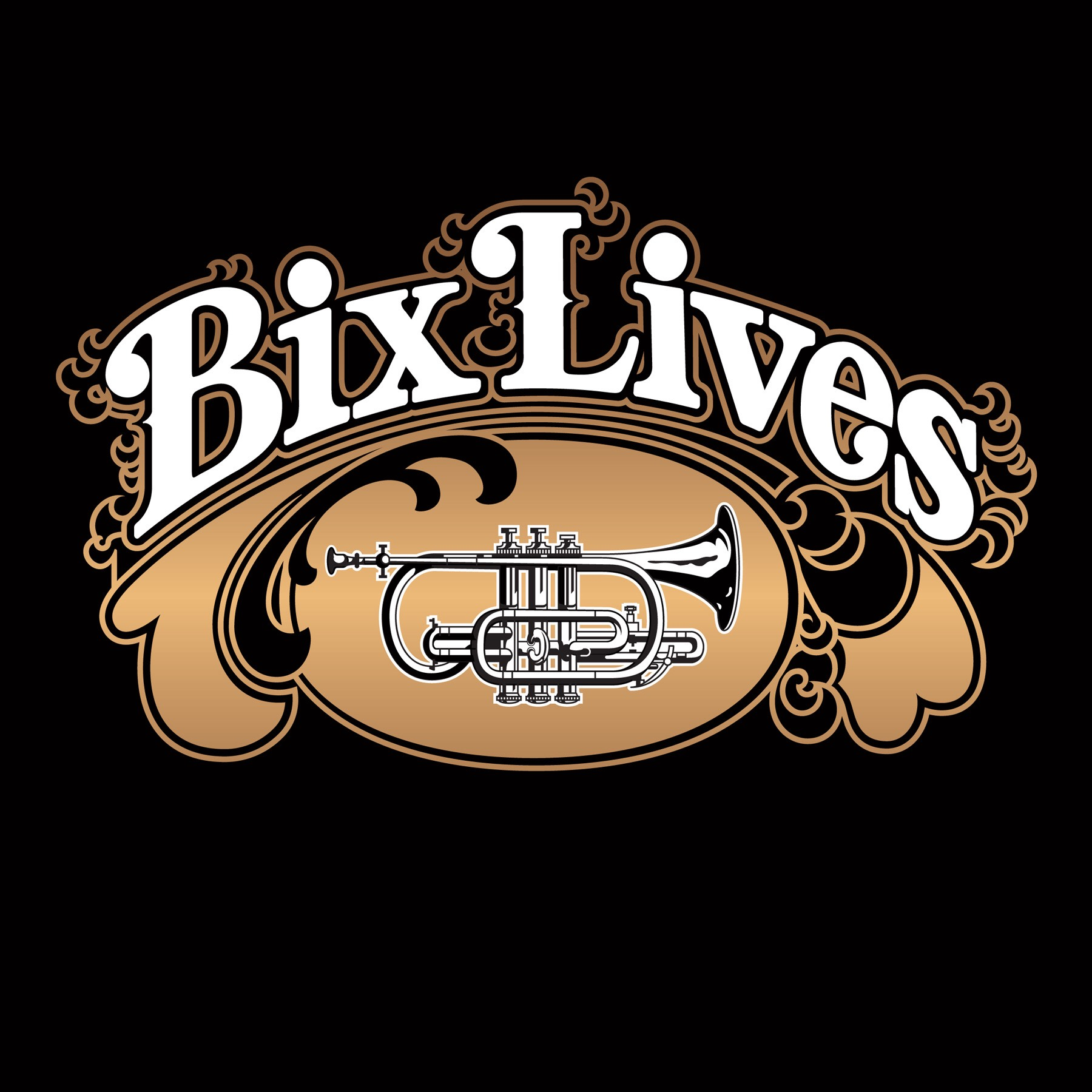
- Genre: Jazz
- Dates: Late July and/or early August
- Locations: Davenport, Iowa, United States
- Coordinates: 41.5198°N 90.5775°W
- Years active: 1971-present
- Founders: Don O’Dette
- Website: www.commonchordqc.org/bix/festival/

Davenport, Iowa's annual Bix Beiderbecke Memorial Jazz Festival commemorates Bix Beiderbecke, a famous jazz cornetist, pianist, and composer who was born in Davenport in 1903. It is one of the largest jazz festivals in the United States. It is held on the weekend after the Bix 7 Road Race, another local event named for Beiderbecke.

== Background ==
The Bix Fest is a three-day music festival with many traditional jazz bands attracted from around the world. It is held the first weekend of August, to commemorate the anniversary of Bix's death on August 6, 1931.

The fest has traditionally been held at several venues around Davenport, anchored by the LeClaire Bandshell on the banks of the Mississippi River. Currently, musical performances are held at the Rhythm City Casino’s Events Center in Davenport. Additional events include a Saturday morning tribute at Oakdale Memorial Cemetery. Jazz is played over Bix's grave in the Beiderbecke family plot. Also, on Sunday morning, a jazz liturgy is held at the First Presbyterian Church in Davenport. The church was the Beiderbecke family's home church, where Bix's mother, Agatha, was the church organist. A band from the festival usually performs at this event.

The festival began in 1971 when Bill Donahoe's Bix Beiderbecke Memorial Jazz Band traveled to Davenport, Iowa to play music at Bix's grave on the 40th anniversary of his death. 2021's Fest will mark the 50th annual Bix Beiderbecke Memorial Jazz Festival, making it the second longest running jazz fest in the United States behind only the Newport Jazz Fest.

The Bix Beiderbecke Memorial Society was founded in 1971, to help keep the memory and musical accomplishments of Beiderbecke alive. In 2026, Common Chord took over the organization of the festival.
