= Patrizia Ragno =

Italian long-distance runner

Personal information
- Nationality: Italian
- Born: 15 June 1972 (age 54)

Sport
- Country: Italy
- Sport: Athletics
- Event: Long-distance running

Achievements and titles
- Personal best: Half marathon: 1:16:12 (1995)

Patrizia Ragno (born 15 June 1972) is a former Italian female long-distance runner who competed at one edition of the IAAF World Cross Country Championships at senior level (1996), and two of the IAAF World Half Marathon Championships (1996, 1997).
