= OWLS AC Leicester =

Athletic club in Leicestershire

The Owls Athletics Club Leicester is one of four leading athletics clubs in Leicestershire, UK. It has gained many regional and national accolades with some individual athletes representing England and Great Britain at junior and senior level. The club is also known for developing its junior athletes and its distinctive vests (bearing black and white stripes).

== History ==
The club began as 'Oadby and Wigston Legionnaires' (acronym OWLS) at the Royal British Legion in Wigston in 1981. As it expanded, two sections formed to cater for differing competitive aspirations. A social running club at the original base in Wigston; and a multi-disciplinary athletics club for junior and senior athletes based at Saffron Lane sports centre in Leicester. The two sections made a complete split in 2008 when the Wigston-based section became "Wigston Phoenix" Running Club, and the Leicester-based section adopting the name Owls AC Leicester.

Originally, the club was founded by a trio of Mick Strange, Phil Starmer Geoff Matthews with the aim to compete against other Leicestershire-based clubs. At a later date, Wayne Walker was recruited as coach for a newly formed junior section and led them to many outstanding successes. After over 25 years service to the club he remains the head coach. After a long initial journey the club began to enjoy its first successes under Wayne's tutelage; with subsequent teams and individuals winning many regional and national competitions ranging from track and field to fell running and cross country.

== Competition ==
The club provides year-round competition for its members in many local, regional and national running and athletics events. These include:

- Leicestershire Road Running League

- North Midlands X-Country League

- County Championships (athletics, cross-country)

- Midlands Counties Championships (athletics, cross-country, relays)

- English National Championships (cross-country, relays)

The club encourages members to participate for the team in club events but also in other events as an individual to enable athletes to develop. The club often organises trips to races abroad including events in Belgium and Spain to enable athletes to experience overseas competition and as social/cultural opportunities.

== Training ==
The main night for club training at Beauchamp College Oadby on Wednesdays for junior and senior athletes of all levels and abilities. Further club training sessions occur on Saturday mornings at Knighton Park and the Leicester Cycle Circuit at New College on a Tuesday evening. The club traditionally meets at Bradgate Park (Newtown Linford Car Park, 10am) on a Sunday morning for a run around some of the nicest parkland and trails in the UK.

== Recent Notable Performances ==
- 19th successive Senior Men's County Cross-Country Team title, 2014

- Senior Men's County Cross-Country Individual title, Sam Stabler, 2014

- North Midlands X-Country League Overall Senior Men's Champions, 2013–14, 2012–13

- North Midlands X-Country League Senior Men's Individual Champion: Edward Highton, 2013–14; Daniel Hallam, 2012-13

- Midlands Cross-Country Relays Senior Men's Champions: 2013, 2012

- Birmingham Cross-Country League Overall Men's Champions 2007
