= Bix 7 Road Race =

Annual road race held in Davenport, Iowa

Bix 7
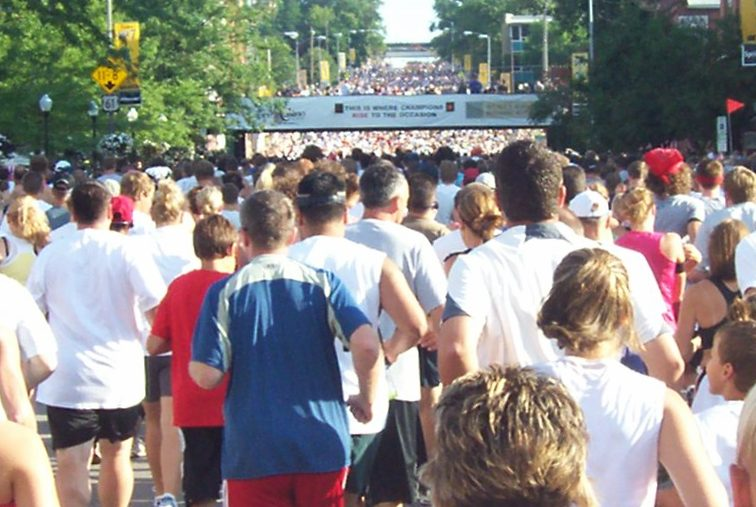
- Date: Last Saturday of July
- Location: Davenport, Iowa
- Event type: Road
- Distance: 7 miles
- Primary sponsor: Quad-City Times
- Established: 1975 (51 years ago)
- Course records: Men: 31:51.99 (1998) (Kenya) John Korir; Women: 35:18 (2016) (Kenya) Mary Jepkosgei Keitany
- Website: Bix 7
- Participants: 18,000+

The Bix 7 Road Race is held annually in Davenport, Iowa, as a commemoration to Davenport native and jazz musician Bix Beiderbecke. It is followed a week later by the Bix Beiderbecke Memorial Jazz Festival.

== Race ==
The 7 mile road race is annually held during late July, in the streets of downtown Davenport, Iowa. The race was founded in 1975 by John Hudetz, a resident of Bettendorf, Iowa. After competing in the 1974 Boston Marathon, Hudetz was inspired to bring the excitement to the Quad-Cities with a race of his own. The inaugural race had a field consisting of eighty-four runners. Today the race is often run by 12,000 to 18,000 runners.

The United States’ boycott of the 1980 Olympics helped gain the Bix 7 exposure. Bill Rodgers, the world's top distance runner at the time, was unable to compete in Moscow, so he went to Davenport instead. The leadership of Race Director Ed Froehlich, promotion by the Quad-City Times newspaper, and generosity from several corporate sponsorships, has helped the Bix 7 develop into the largest non-marathon race in the Midwest, The race consistently draws elite talent from all over the globe. Running legends Bill Rodgers and 1984 Olympic Marathon Gold Medalist Joan Benoit Samuelson also compete yearly.

The run is primarily sponsored by the Quad City Times and is a separate entity from the Bix Beiderbecke Memorial Society and the Bix Beiderbecke Memorial Jazz Festival, which is held the following weekend. The race has several other sponsors, at the Platinum, Gold Medal, and contributing level respectively.

== Champions ==
| Edition | Year | Entries | Purse | USATF Championship | Men's Winner | Country | Time | Women's Winner | Country | Time |
|---|---|---|---|---|---|---|---|---|---|---|
| 1 | 1975 | 84 | $0 | | Lucien Rosa | Sri Lanka | 34:33.8 | Kim Merritt | United States | 41:04 |
| 2 | 1976 | 114 | $0 | | Dan Copper | United States | 36:47 | Kim Merritt | United States | 41:33 |
| 3 | 1977 | 350 | $0 | | Kevin Mcdonald | United States | 36:50 | Lynn Schmidt | United States | 42:45 |
| 4 | 1978 | 500 | $0 | | John Lodwick | United States | 34:56 | Kathy Loper | United States | 45:38 |
| 5 | 1979 | 800 | $0 | | Gregg Newell | United States | 35:40 | Ilene Kimsey | United States | 46:25 |
| 6 | 1980 | 1,500 | $0 | | Bill Rodgers | United States | 33:58 | Peggy Schott | United States | 43:59 |
| 7 | 1981 | 2,500 | $0 | | Bill Rodgers | United States | 33:26 | Beverly Roland-Miller | United States | 41:26 |
| 8 | 1982 | 3,500 | $0 | | Robert de Castella | Australia | 32:45* | Ellen Hart | United States | 38:24 |
| 9 | 1983 | 5,620 | $0 | | Joseph Nzau | Kenya | 33:10 | Joan Benoit Samuelson | United States | 37:26 |
| 10 | 1984 | 6,750 | $0 | | Ashley Johnson | South Africa | 33:06 | Kellie Cathey | United States | 38:04 |
| 11 | 1985 | 7,174 | $0 | | Mark Curp | United States | 32:56 | Joan Benoit Samuelson | United States | 37:38 |
| 12 | 1986 | 9,325 | $0 | | Geoff Smith | United Kingdom | 33:16 | Joan Benoit Samuelson | United States | 37:56 |
| 13 | 1987 | 12,372 | $0 | | Joseph Nzau | Kenya | 33:24 | Francie Larrieu Smith | United States | 38:10 |
| 14 | 1988 | 12,425 | $0 | | Mark Curp | United States | 33:22 | Joan Benoit Samuelson | United States | 37:59 |
Prize money offered
| 15 | 1989 | 15,639 | $39,500 | | Mark Nenow | United States | 32:17 | Erin Baker | New Zealand | 36:35 |
| 16 | 1990 | 16,521 | $39,250 | | Steve Kogo | Kenya | 32:47 | María Trujillo | Mexico | 37:58 |
| 17 | 1991 | 18,124 | $39,250 | | Ken Martin | United States | 32:21 | Uta Pippig | Germany | 37:04 |
| 18 | 1992 | 18,246 | $60,000 | | Alejandro Cruz | Mexico | 32:21 | Olga Markova | Unified Team | 36:48 |
| 19 | 1993 | 16,859 | $39,000 | | Thomas Osano | Kenya | 32:10 | Uta Pippig | Germany | 36:27 |
| 20 | 1994 | 20,097 | $40,000 | | Benson Masya | Kenya | 31:56 | Tegla Loroupe | Kenya | 36:02 |
| 21 | 1995 | 18,354 | $39,750 | | Phillimon Hanneck | Zimbabwe | 32:08 | Anne Hare | New Zealand | 37:33 |
| 22 | 1996 | 18,108 | $39,250 | | Peter Githuka | Kenya | 32:05 | Hellen Kimaiyo | Kenya | 36:18 |
| 23 | 1997 | 18,388 | $80,000 | | Khalid Khannouchi | Morocco | 32:54 | Colleen De Reuck | South Africa | 37:34 |
Junior Bix Introduced
| 24 | 1998 | 22,143 | $50,000 | | John Korir | Kenya | 31:51.99 | Colleen De Reuck | South Africa | 36:38 |
| 25 | 1999 | 20,117 | $48,200 | | John Korir | Kenya | 32:59 | Catherine Ndereba | Kenya | 37:30 |
| 26 | 2000 | 15,011 | $49,800 | | Mark Yatich | Kenya | 32:31 | Colleen De Reuck | South Africa | 36:42 |
Brady Street Sprint Introduced
| 27 | 2001 | 18,958 | $45,000 | | John Korir | Kenya | 32:24 | Catherine Ndereba | Kenya | 37:05 |
| 28 | 2002 | 19,658 | $45,000 | Yes | Meb Keflezighi | United States | 32:36 | Colleen De Reuck | United States | 37:44 |
| 29 | 2003 | 19,854 | $45,000 | | John Korir | Kenya | 32:34 | Catherine Ndereba | Kenya | 37:12 |
| 30 | 2004 | 16,627 | $45,000 | | John Korir | Kenya | 32:36 | Susan Chepkemei | Kenya | 35:24 |
| 31 | 2005 | 20,211 | $45,000 | | Gilbert Okari | Kenya | 32:24 | Nuța Olaru | Romania | 36:53 |
| 32 | 2006 | 19,397 | $45,000 | | Lawrence Kiprotich | Kenya | 32:13 | Susan Chepkemei | Kenya | 37:35 |
| 33 | 2007 | 18,499 | $45,000 | | Duncan Kibet | Kenya | 32:15 | Wude Ayalew | Ethiopia | 36:57 |
| 34 | 2008 | 18,108 | $45,000 | | Edward Muge | Kenya | 32:16 | Edith Masai | Kenya | 37:20 |
| 35 | 2009 | 18,335 | $50,000 | Yes | Meb Keflezighi | United States | 32:25 | Molly Huddle | United States | 37:39 |
| 36 | 2010 | 17,598 | $50,000 | Yes | Ryan Hall | United States | 32:55 | Lisa Uhl | United States | 37:52 |
| 37 | 2011 | 18,057 | $50,000 | | Silas Kipruto | Kenya | 32:36 | Caroline Rotich | Kenya | 36:42 |
| 38 | 2012 | 18,138 | $50,000 | | Silas Kipruto | Kenya | 32:31 | Margaret Muriuki | Kenya | 36:17 |
| 39 | 2013 | 18,244 | $50,000 | | Leonard Korir | Kenya | 32:15 | Sule Utura | Ethiopia | 36:34 |
| 40 | 2014 | 18,949 | $50,000 | Yes | Sean Quigley | United States | 33:28 | Molly Huddle | United States | 36:14 |
| 41 | 2015 | 17,293 | $50,000 | | Leonard Korir | Kenya | 33:06 | Cynthia Limo | Kenya | 36:57 |
| 42 | 2016 | 17,111 | $50,000 | | Silas Kipruto | Kenya | 33:03 | Mary Keitany | Kenya | 35:18 |
| 43 | 2017 | 16,466 | $50,000 | Yes | Sam Chelanga | United States | 32:52 | Aliphine Tuliamuk | United States | 36:30 |
| 44 | 2018 | 12,776 | $50,000 | | Belay Tilahun | Ethiopia | 32:37 | Margaret Muriuki | Kenya | 35:57 |
| 45 | 2019 | 13,111 | $50,000 | | Leonard Barsoton | Kenya | 32:34 | Joyciline Jepkosgei | Kenya | 36:04 |
| | 2020 | In person race cancelled due to COVID-19 pandemic. Held as a virtual event. | | | | | | | | |
| 46 | 2021 | 9,750 | $50,000 | Yes | Leonard Korir | United States | 32:48 | Edna Kiplagat | Kenya | 37:16 |
| 47 | 2022 | 6,086 | $30,800 | No | Patrick Tiernan | Australia | 32:32 | Fiona O'Keeffe | United States | 35:58 |
| 48 | 2023 | 6,820 | $50,000 | Yes | Abbabiya Simbassa | United States | 32:34 | Kellyn Taylor | United States | 36:32 |
| 49 | 2024 | 9,829 | $50,000 | No | Wesley Kiptoo | Kenya | 32:27 | Rachael Zena Chebet | Uganda | 36:11 |
| 50 | 2025 | 7,931 | $50,000 | No | Alex Maier | United States | 32:02 | Vibian Chepkirui | Kenya | 36:40 |
