= Trine Pilskog =

Norwegian middle-distance runner

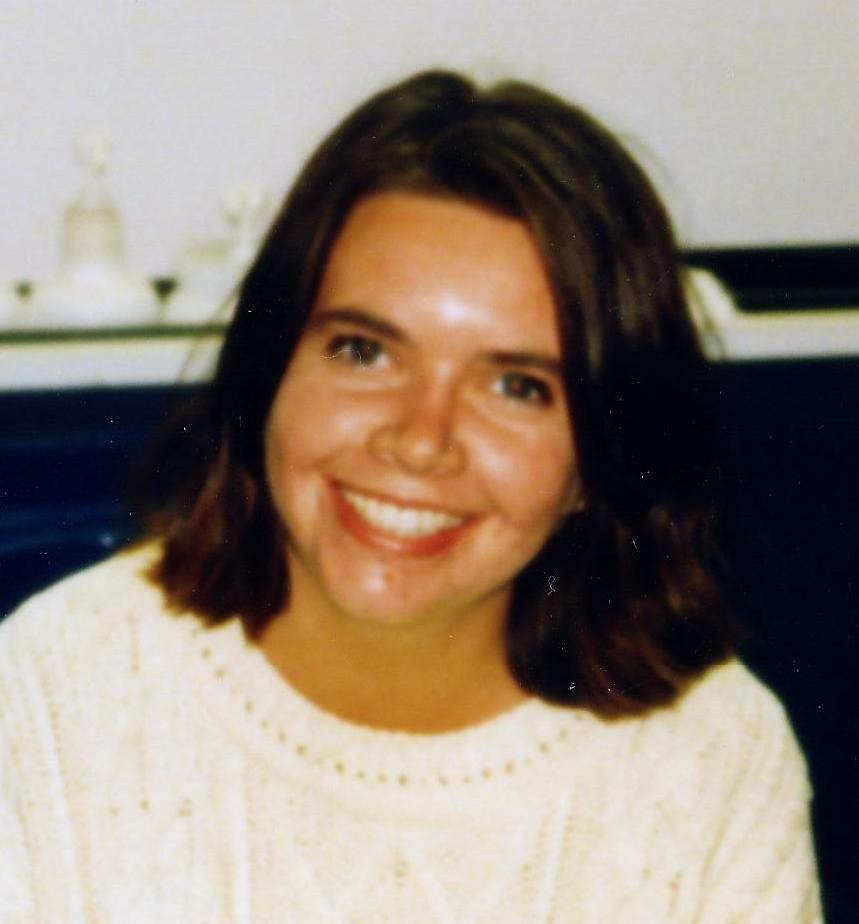
- Pilskog in 1993

Personal information
- Nationality: Norwegian
- Born: 1 December 1972 (age 53) Hareid Municipality, Norway

Sport
- Sport: Athletics
- Club: Hareid IL

Trine Pilskog (born 1 December 1972) is a Norwegian middle-distance runner. She was born in Hareid Municipality.

Running for the Arkansas Razorbacks track and field team, Pilskog won the 1995 mile run at the NCAA Division I Indoor Track and Field Championships in a time of 4:39.19.

She was Norwegian champion in 1500 metres in 1997.

She competed in the 1,500 m at the 2004 Summer Olympics in Athens.
