= May Allison (runner) =

Canadian long-distance runner

May Allison (born October 29, 1964, in Toronto, Ontario) is a former long-distance runner from Canada.

Allison represented Canada at the 1996 Summer Olympics in Atlanta, Georgia. There she finished the women's marathon in 52nd place.

== Achievements ==
- All results regarding marathon, unless stated otherwise

| Year | Competition | Venue | Position | Notes |
Representing Canada
| 1996 | Olympic Games | Atlanta, United States | 52nd | 2:44:38 |
| 1997 | World Championships | Athens, Greece | 48th | 3:01:26 |
