= Nadezhda Stepanova =

Russian long-distance runner

Medal record

Women's athletics

Representing the Soviet Union

IAAF World Cross Country Championships
Silver medal – second place	1989 Stavanger	Senior race
Gold medal – first place	1989 Stavanger	Senior team

Nadezhda Stepanova (married name Nadezhda Galyamova, Russian: Надежда Степанова; born 22 July 1959) is a Russian former long-distance runner. Her sole international medals of note came at the 1989 IAAF World Cross Country Championships, where she was silver medallist behind France's Annette Sergent in the senior women's race and led the Soviet women to the team title with the help of Yelena Romanova, Natalya Sorokivskaya and Regina Chistyakova. She competed in distance track events in the mid-1980s.
