= Great West Run =

Annual road running event in Exeter, England

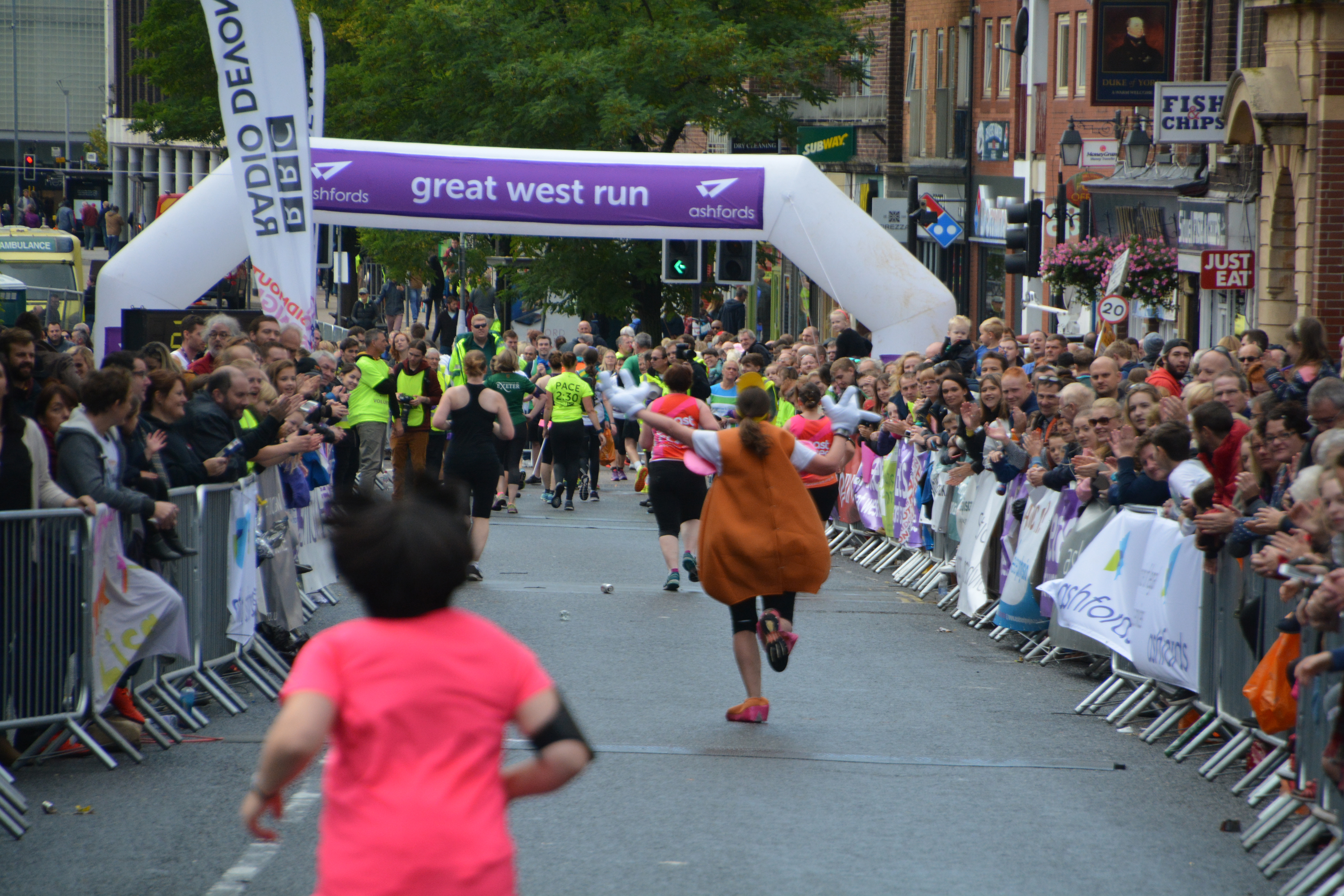
- Participants run along the race course (2016)
- Date: October
- Location: Exeter, Devon, England
- Event type: Road
- Distance: Half marathon, 1.5-mile
- Primary sponsor: Friends Provident (previous); Guildhall Shopping Centre (2009); Tozers Soliciters (2014)
- Established: 1985; 41 years ago
- Website: thegreatwestrun.co.uk

The Great West Run is an annual road running event held through the streets of Exeter. It was first run in 1985. Originally run as a marathon, in recent years it has always been run as a half marathon. In 2009 a course record was set, but the route has gone through numerous changes, with new routes in 2006, 2013 and 2017. In 2013 the event moved from an early May date to an October date. Junior and family 1.5-mile events take place in parallel to the main run.

== Sponsorship ==
For some years it was sponsored by Friends Provident. In 2009 the chief sponsor was the Guildhall Shopping Centre in central Exeter. In 2014 the event was sponsored by Tozers Solicitors.

== Recent winners ==
Table of recent winners.

Year	Date	Men's winner	Time (h:m:s)	Women's winner	Time (h:m:s)
2004	2 May	John Ward	1:10:23	Maddie Horton	1:16:43
2005	2 May	John Ward	1:08:50	Maddie Horton	1:18:47
2006	30 Apr	Kairn Stone	1:10:36	Heather Foundling-Hawker	1:22:43
2007	6 May	Mark Croasdale	1:10:10	Heather Foundling-Hawker	1:22:43
2008	4 May	Kairn Stone	1:10:27	Catherine Newman	1:21:12
2009	3 May	Kairn Stone	1:09:05	Heather Foundling-Hawker	1:23:45
2010	2 May	Tom Merson	1:10:10	Lucy Commander	1:25:05
2011	1 May	Tom Merson	1:10:16	Lucy Commander	1:25:33
2012	6 May	Shaun Antell	1:10:38	Vicky Pincombe	1:22:13
2013	13 Oct	Tom Merson	1:10:02	Lucy MacAlister	1:19:08
2014	19 Oct	Tom Merson	1:09:20	Hannah Brooks	1:21:42
2015	18 Oct	Shaun Antell	1:10:08	Annabel Granger	1:21:18
2016	16 Oct	Phil Wylie	1:10:10	Lucy MacAlister	1:20:57
2017	15 Oct	Tom Merson	1:09:39	Annabel Granger	1:23:14
2018	14 Oct	Peter Le Grice	1:06:23	Carys Hughes	1:22:37
2019	13 Oct	Tom Merson	1:07:04	Carys Hughes	1:20:45
2022	22 May	Tom Merson	1:08:13	Sammy Antell	1:21:12
2023	21 May	Alex Carter	1:07:34	Rosie Mew	1:21:21
2024	26 May	Joshua Benford	1:09:08	Anna Harrold	1:19:28
2025	25 May	Simon Fox	1:10:25	Atsede Gidey	1:19:35
