= Monica Conti =

Italian long-distance runner

Personal information
- National team: Italy (2 caps 1989)
- Born: 10 August 1964 (age 61) Florence, Italy

Sport
- Country: Italy
- Sport: Athletics
- Events: Long-distance running; Cross country running

Achievements and titles
- Personal best: 3 km: 9:21.43 (1988)

Monica Conti (born 10 August 1964) is a former Italian long-distance runner and cross-country runner who competed at individual senior level at the World Athletics Cross Country Championships (1989).
