= Kevin Gavin =

American serial killer

- Born: August 19, 1954 (age 72); Brooklyn, New York City, New York, U.S.
- Other name: "Point"
- Conviction: Murder x3
- Penalty: 30 years-to-life imprisonment

Details
- Victims: 3–5
- Span of crimes: 2015–2021
- Country: United States
- State: New York
- Date apprehended: January 22, 2021
- Imprisoned at: Elmira Correctional Facility

Kevin Gavin (born August 19, 1954) is an American serial killer who robbed and murdered three elderly women in Brooklyn housing complexes between 2015 and 2021. In addition to this, he is suspected of killing two elderly men, one of them being his own brother, but was never charged with them. The killings caused an uproar due to police negligence surrounding the initial deaths.

After several years of delays due to the COVID-19 pandemic, Gavin was eventually tried, convicted, and sentenced to life imprisonment with a chance of parole after serving 30 years.

== Early life ==
Kevin Gavin was born on August 19, 1954, in Brooklyn, New York City. He and his siblings grew up in an impoverished family that, like most residents of the area in the early 1970s, resorted to crime. Gavin himself began committing various crimes in the mid-1970s and until 2010, he amassed eight convictions on charges of theft, drug possession and distribution, and illegal possession of a firearm. During one of these incidents, he suffered a stab wound to the face that later led to the loss of his left eye that had to be replaced with a glass one.

In 2010, after being released from prison yet again, Gavin moved in to live illegally at the apartment of his older brother at the Carter G. Woodson Houses, a public housing complex for seniors located in the Brownsville neighborhood. He attempted to obtain a permit to rent one of the apartments in the complex, but his request was denied due to overcrowding and his prior criminal convictions.

During this period, Gavin earned a living as a handyman or providing household assistance to the locals, who paid him in cash or supplied him with food. Despite this, he had a negative reputation among the residents due to the fact that he often borrowed money and was slow to repay it, as well as the fact that he was addicted to crack cocaine.

== Murders ==
=== Myrtle McKinney ===
According to investigators, Gavin's first victim was 82-year-old Myrtle McKinney, a Jamaican immigrant who was the mother of seven children and previously worked as a housekeeper in Florida and the Bahamas. The woman lived next door to the Gavin brothers, with whom she was on friendly terms. Leon was known in the complex as "Music Man", as he liked to host dance parties in the courtyard during the evenings, using a small speaker connected to his mobility scooter.

On November 8, 2015, Kevin Gavin broke into McKinney's apartment, where he then proceeded to beat and stab her to death. Her body was discovered on the following day by police officers who were dispatched to the apartment to conduct a welfare check on McKinney. The call came from her caregiver, Patricia Goodman, who was unable to get in touch with McKinney and could not find her after looking around in the complex.

==== Investigation into McKinney's death and reclassification as a homicide ====
Initially, law enforcement officials assumed that McKinney's death was an accident, suggesting that she had fallen on the floor and hit her head against a hard surface. This theory originated from the fact that there were no signs of forced entry and that the apartment itself appeared undisturbed. A doctor who had been treating her also suggested that it was highly likely that McKinney could have lost consciousness and fallen to the floor without outside assistance, as she suffered from diabetes and hypertension. On this basis, he signed a death certificate–without examining the body–stating that McKinney had died of natural causes.

Her daughter, Donna Meeks, objected to this decision. She claimed that her mother might have been murdered, since her body was found under a table a considerable distance from the chair where she had been sitting; her apartment keys and ID were missing, and $800 had been withdrawn from her bank card.

Due to these discrepancies, Mix filed a report to the police regarding the missing money, hoping that it would prompt an investigation, and tried to convince the medical examiners at the Medical Examiner's Office to perform an autopsy – her request was denied, as McKinney's death was ruled to be of natural causes. In early December 2015, Mix and her brother took their mother's body to a funeral home in the Flatbush neighborhood to prepare it for burial. While conducting the preparations, the director of the funeral home noticed a stab wound on the neck and immediately notified the police. Shortly thereafter, the body was taken to the medical examiner's office and an autopsy was performed. The results revealed injuries to McKinney's head and torso caused by blows from a blunt instrument, three broken ribs, and the aforementioned stab wound to the neck.

==== Renewed investigation ====
A few days after this discovery, Rodney Harrison, the head of the New York Police Department's detective division, tried in vain at a press conference to explain to reporters how the officers who arrived at the crime scene could have failed to notice the wound on McKinney's neck. Although by that time it was highly unlikely that the killer could be caught since the crime scene had been cleaned up and the victim's belongings were divided among her children, the Brooklyn Police Department nevertheless launched an investigation and compiled a list of suspects.

The list of suspects included three residents of the complex: an elderly man known by the nickname "Peebles", and the two Gavin brothers. During the investigation, "Peebles" provided a solid alibi and was ruled out as a suspect. Thereafter, Leon Gavin came under suspicion because he appeared alongside McKinney on CCTV footage, escorting her to a bank in downtown Brooklyn. However, as there was no credible evidence for his guilt, all charges against him were dropped and he was released. In December 2015, he gave an interview to The New York Times in which he shared his belief that McKinney really had died of a heart attack and that he was shocked somebody had killed her.

In the meantime, Kevin Gavin left New York City and went into hiding. Since there was no evidence against him either, Al Brust, a homicide detective assigned to the case, could not issue a warrant for his arrest.

=== Jacolia James ===
In April 2019, Kevin Gavin murdered 83-year-old Jacolia James, one of the most popular residents of the complex, who had several children, grandchildren, and more than two dozen great-grandchildren. Using his friendly relations to her, he gained access to her apartment, where he then attacked and strangled her to death. James' body was discovered by one of her grandsons, Darrin, who had planned to spend the night at her place. During a conversation with law enforcement officials, Darrin stated that on the morning of the murder, he had seen an elderly black man entering his grandmother's apartment–the description he provided closely matched Gavin. However, he was not questioned, as the police determined that his presence was not enough evidence to file charges, as he was known to spend virtually all his free time going door–to–door searching for work, and was acquainted with all the residents of the housing complex.

During this period, residents of the housing complex began filing complaints about inadequate security. Diane Johnson, president of the Carter G. Woodson Houses Residents' Association, demanded at monthly meetings with representatives of the New York City Housing Authority–the owners of the complex–that the Authority managers install surveillance cameras in the building; but the managers advised her to contact the City Council, which traditionally funded the installation of cameras in other housing complexes managed by NYCHA. Johnson also informed the managers that the private security guards, who had been hired many years ago to monitor the building's entrance doors, were negligent in performing their duties, were absent from their posts, left the complex's doors open late into the night, allowed visitors into the building without checking their IDs, and never patrolled the grounds or hallways on the upper floors.

=== Hector Higgins (suspected) ===
Four months later, in August 2019, according to investigators, Gavin killed a resident of the complex named Hector Higgins, who was found dead by his caregiver, who had returned after a long weekend. While searching through the apartment, police concluded that Higgins had died in an accident after falling from a ladder leaning against a wall in his apartment. However, other residents and his relatives contested this version of events, stating that Higgins, who was nearly 80 years old, was unable to climb the ladder and that his fall had been staged by someone.

During the investigation, several residents stated that on the night of Higgins' death, they saw Gavin approach the elderly man and offered to clean his apartment. Higgins allegedly agreed and gave him a wad of cash to pay for the work and buy cleaning supplies. While conducting the autopsy, the medical examiner discovered several broken ribs and did not rule out the possibility that Higgins could have sustained them as a result of multiple blows, possibly from a fist. However, his death was ultimately ruled to be from congestive heart failure, and that the broken ribs were a "contributing factor".

=== Leon Gavin (suspected) ===
Between March and April 2020, during the COVID-19 pandemic, six elderly men and women died in the apartment complex, including Gavin's 80-year-old brother, Leon, who was found on the floor of his apartment. According to investigators, Kevin Gavin may have been involved in some of the deaths, but no evidence was found to charge him. Since he was not listed on the lease signed by his brother, he had no legal grounds to remain in the building after his brother's death and was supposed to be evicted per the NYCHA's policy. However, he was allowed to remain there due to a city-wide moratorium on evictions that been enacted a few weeks prior to the start of the pandemic.

=== Juanita Caballero ===
On January 14, 2021, Gavin murdered 78-year-old Juanita Caballero, who lived across the hall from his residence. Although she used a walker to get around, Caballero had a reputation as one of the most energetic residents of the complex, as she enjoyed going out to the Coney Island waterfront, earned extra money by selling cigarettes in the lobby, and, despite her age, drank alcoholic beverages. After breaking into her apartment, Gavin strangled her with a telephone cord. Her body was discovered on the following day by her son, Steven.

== Arrest, investigation, and trial ==
Following Caballero's murder, law enforcement agencies across New York City were put under intense scrutiny. A few days later, investigators reviewed the transaction history of her bank cards and noticed that they had been used to purchase groceries at a grocery store close to the housing complex. While reviewing CCTV footage, police determined that the individual seen using the cards was Kevin Gavin.

On this basis, he was detained and taken to the nearest police station. During his initial interrogations, Gavin confessed to killing McKinney, James and Caballero, describing in detail how he carried out the crimes. According to him, the motive for the killings was financial gain and disputes over small amounts of money. His admissions were partially corroborated after a DNA test linked him to prints found at the James crime scene. As there was no evidence to charge him in the deaths of either Higgins or his brother, Gavin was only charged with the three murders he admitted to.

Due to the COVID-19 pandemic, Gavin's trial was repeatedly delayed until early 2026. At said trial, he pleaded guilty to three counts of murder before the Brooklyn District Court. On May 20, 2026, he was convicted and sentenced to life imprisonment with a chance of parole after serving at least 30 years in prison.

== Aftermath ==
Following Gavin's arrest, the victims' relatives and other residents of the housing complex accused the police of negligence and the leadership of NYCHA of systematic racism, since they failed to take any precautionary measures since 2015. They pointed out that had their demands for installation of CCTV and an increased number of security guards had been met, they could have prevented at least two of Gavin's murders from occurring.

For their part, law enforcement officials admitted that they had no idea a serial killer was operating in the area until they arrested Gavin but maintained that this had nothing to do with the victims' race. NYCHA's leadership also denied the accusations of racism, stating that they had been focused on modernizing all their buildings since the late 2010s, but were halted due to restrictions placed during the pandemic.

== See also ==
- List of serial killers in the United States
- List of serial killers active in the 2020s
