= Stephenson Nyamau =

Kenyan long-distance runner

Stephenson Nyamau (born 20 November 1971) is a retired Kenyan long-distance runner.

At the 1991 World Cross Country Championships he finished sixth in the long race, and won a gold medal for Kenya in the team competition. He also won the bronze medal in the junior category in 1989.
