= Christian Leuprecht =

Italian long-distance runner

Personal information
- Nationality: Italian
- Born: 28 May 1971 (age 55) Bolzano

Sport
- Country: Italy
- Sport: Athletics
- Events: Long-distance running Marathon

Achievements and titles
- Personal bests: 3000 m: 7:51.53 (1990); 5000 m: 13:29.97 (1992); 10,000 m: 27:48.07 (1991); Half marathon: 1:06.45 (2002); Marathon: 2:14:47 (1996)
Medal record
European Junior Championships
Gold medal – first place	1989 Varaždin	10.000 m

Christian Leuprecht (born 28 May 1971) is a former Italian male long-distance runner who competed at three editions of the IAAF World Cross Country Championships at senior level (1991, 1992, 1996).

== See also ==
- List of European junior records in athletics
