= Wilfred Kirochi =

Kenyan middle-distance runner

Medal record

Men's Athletics

Representing Kenya

World Championships
| Silver medal – second place | 1991 Tokyo | 1500 m |

Wilfred Kirochi (born 12 December 1969) is a former Kenyan middle-distance runner who won a silver medal at the 1991 World Championships in Tokyo in the 1500 m event. Previously Kirochi had won two World Junior Championship titles in 1986 and 1988 (where he defeated future world and Olympic champion Noureddine Morceli).

In 1990, Kirochi also won the silver medal at the Commonwealth Games in Auckland behind Peter Elliott. Kirochi did not qualify for the 1992 Olympic Games in Barcelona, as he did not finish in the top three at the Kenyan trials in Nairobi. However, just prior to the Olympics, he won meets in Oslo and Nice, where he set a temporary world season's best. Later in the season, he improved his personal best to 3:32.49.

== Achievements ==
| Year | Competition | Venue | Position | Event | Notes |
Representing Kenya
| 1986 | World Junior Championships | Athens, Greece | 1st | 1500 m | 3:44.62 |
| 1987 | All-Africa Games | Nairobi, Kenya | 2nd | 1500 m | 3:39.66 |
| 1988 | World Junior Championships | Sudbury, Canada | 1st | 1500m | 3:46.52 |
| 1988 | World Junior Championships | Sudbury, Canada | 10th (h) | 4 × 400 m relay | 3:11.71 |
