= Spencer Duval =

British middle-distance runner

Personal information
- Nationality: British (English)
- Born: 5 January 1970 (age 56) Lichfield, England
- Height: 178 cm (5 ft 10 in)
- Weight: 63 kg (139 lb)

Sport
- Sport: Athletics
- Event: Middle-distance / Steeplechase
- Club: Cannock & Stafford AC

Spencer Gavin Duval (born 5 January 1970) is a male British retired middle-distance runner who competed in the men's 3000 metres steeplechase at the 1996 Summer Olympics.

== Biography ==
He represented England in the 3000 metres steeplechase event, at the 1994 Commonwealth Games in Victoria, British Columbia, Canada. Four years later he represented England in the 3000 metres steeplechase event again, at the 1998 Commonwealth Games in Kuala Lumpur, Malaysia.

Duval was a three-times British 3000 metres steeplechase champion after winning the British AAA Championships title at the 1995 AAA Championships and the 1997 AAA Championships, in addition to the UK Athletics Championships title in 1993.
