= Romanian Cross Country Championships =

Cross country running competition in Romania

- Date: Varies
- Location: Various, Romania
- Event type: Cross country
- Distance: 10 km for men 8 km for women
- Established: 1916

The Romanian Cross Country Championships (Romanian: Campionatul Național de Cros) is an annual cross country running organised by the Romanian Athletics Federation that serves as the national championship for the sport in Romania. The scheduling of the event varies – sometimes it is held in late Autumn from October to November, other times in spring from February to April.

After an initial hosting in 1916, it was formally established as an annual event from 1920 onwards. Initially a men's competition only, a women's championship race was introduced in 1947. Bar one interruption in 1961, the races has been contested every year since. Additional short course races over four kilometres were occasionally held at the championships, appearing in 1958 and during the distance's presence at the IAAF World Cross Country Championships from 1998 to 2006 (bar 2001).

The most successful athlete in the men's race, and overall, is Cristea Dinu, who won ten titles in the period from 1935 to 1951. In the women's section, Edith Treybal has the most titles with six, starting with a win in 1948 then having five consecutive wins from 1950–54

== Editions ==
=== Long race ===
Year	Date	Location	Men's winner	Time	Women's winner	Time
1916	22 April	Bucharest	Constantin Dumitrescu	36:20		
1917–19	Not held					
1920	25 April	Bucharest	Constantin Dumitrescu	27:10		
1921	?	?	Eugen Bellu			
1922	?	?	Jean Dumitrescu			
1923	?	?	Vintilă Cristescu			
1924	25 April	Brașov	Adalbert Marton	48:16.2		
1925	22 November	Bucharest	Adalbert Marton			
1926	21 November	Bucharest	Ion Petrescu	43:15		
1927	27 November	Bucharest	Ion Petrescu	42:07		
1928	25 November	Bucharest	Niculae Ilie	39:00		
1929	26 November	Bucharest	Marin L Marin	39:20		
1930	16 November	Bucharest	Ion Manea	35:38.2		
1931	22 November	Bucharest	Ion Manea	26:10		
1932	20 November	Bucharest	Ion Manea	29:25		
1933	26 November	Bucharest	Ion Manea	38:48		
1934	18 November	Bucharest	Ion Manea	35:42		
1935	25 November	Bucharest	Cristea Dinu	34:55		
1936	20 December	Bucharest	Cristea Dinu			
1937	5 December	Bucharest	Cristea Dinu	45:22		
1938	4 December	Bucharest	Cristea Dinu	44:08		
1939	6 December	Bucharest	Radu Ionita	32:59		
1940	1 December	Bucharest	Dumitru Talmaciu	45:30		
1941	7 December	Bucharest	Cristea Dinu			
1942	6 December	Bucharest	Dumitru Talmaciu	33:03		
1943	28 November	Bucharest	Cristea Dinu	32:47		
1944	19 November	Bucharest	Cristea Dinu	41:12		
1945	2 December	Bucharest	Cristea Dinu	41:23		
1946	1 December	Bucharest	Constantin Vladuca	32:18		
1947	30 November	Bucharest	Cristea Dinu		Viorica Marinescu	
1948	28 November	Bucharest	Emil Pandrea	33:20.7	Edith Treybal	4:56.2
1949	10 April	Bucharest	Victor Firea	31:47.4	Maria Nicolau	
1950	30 April	Bucharest	Victor Firea		Edith Treybal	
1951	30 April	Constanța	Cristea Dinu	29:09.2	Edith Treybal	5:31.8
1952	27 April	Galați	Dumitru Vasile	27:51	Edith Treybal	6:25.4
1953	26 April	Bucharest	Dumitru Vasile	31:44	Edith Treybal	5:23
1954	25 April	Bucharest	Nicolae Bunea	32:53	Edith Treybal	8:54
1955	13 March	Oradea	Victor Pop	34:26	Aniela Pasciuc	8:49
1956	18 March	Oradea	Victor Pop	32:18	Aniela Pasciuc	8:39
1957	7 April	Sibiu	Constantin Grecescu	30:40	Aniela Pasciuc	5:07
1958	13 April	Sibiu	Constantin Grecescu	30:50	Aniela Pasciuc	8:41
1959	12 April	Sibiu	Ion Veliciu	29:35	Georgete Dumitrescu	5:40
1960	17 April	Sibiu	Constantin Grecescu		Georgete Dumitrescu	
1961	Not held					
1962	11 March	Ploiești	Andrei Barabaș	24:18.6	Florica Grecescu	5:28.3
1963	10 March	Craiova	Constantin Grecescu	26:33.0	Florica Grecescu	6:33.0
1964	15 March	Călimănești	Zoltan Vamoș	24:40.6	Irina Miklos	6:01.0
1965	14 March	Bucharest	Nicolae Mustata	26:14.0	Irina Miklos	6:43.6
1966	30 October	Pitești	Nicolae Mustata	23:51.8	Viorica Gabor	5:45.8
1966	13 March	Bucharest	Andrei Barabaș		Viorica Gabor	
1967	19 November	Pitești	Ilie Cioca	29:51.6	Viorica Gabor	6:15.8
1968	3 March	Pitești	Ion Rusnac	34:31.2	Viorica Gabor	7:08.0
1969	9 November	Bucharest	Nicolae Mustata		Viorica Gabor	
1970	8 November	Târgu Mureș	Nicolae Mustata		Elisabeta Baciu	6:32.2
1971	31 October	Sibiu	Nicolae Mustata	29:45.0	Maria Linca	5:53.0
1972	5 November	Băile Felix	Nicolae Mustata	31:46.5	Maria Linca	6:18.6
1973	4 November	Băile Felix	Petre Lupan		Maria Linca	
1974	20 October	Băile Felix	Ilie Floroiu	29:54.3	Fița Lovin	6:21.8
1975	19 October	Sibiu	Ilie Floroiu		Fița Lovin	
1976	24 October	Craiova	Ilie Floroiu	28:40.0	Natalia Mărășescu	7:39.9
1977	10 April	Timișoara	Ilie Floroiu	34:43	Natalia Mărășescu	14:33
1978	2 April	Craiova	Ilie Floroiu	34:57.5	Maricica Puică	12:23
1979	8 April	Sibiu	Gheorghe Zaharia	33:56	Maricica Puică	15:36
1980	6 April	Craiova	Ilie Floroiu	35:38	Fița Lovin	13:26
1981	5 April	Alba Iulia	Gheorghe Zaharia	36:21.4	Fița Lovin	15:04.8
1982	4 April	Galați	Gheorghe Zaharia	36:54	Maricica Puică	14:45
1983	3 April	Craiova	György Marko	35:05	Maricica Puică	13:47
1984	26 February	Băile Felix	György Marko	36:07.3	Maricica Puică	14:23.2
1985	14 February	Băile Felix	György Marko	35:57.4	Mariana Chirila	14:31.3
1986	16 February	Băile Felix	Gheorghe Sandu	36:26	Mariana Chirila	14:01
1987	22 February	Băile Felix	Maricel Martinas		Mariana Chirila	
1988	10 April	Craiova	Ilie Elena	36:00	Iulia Olteanu	14:30
1989	9 April	Sfântu Gheorghe	Augustin Barbu	36:27	Elena Fidatov	14:25
1990	1 April	Craiova	Ilie Elena	36:32	Margareta Keszeg	14:21
1991	31 March	Craiova	Iacob Costea	37:31	Margareta Keszeg	15:04
1992	28 March	Craiova	Ilie Elena	37:40.3	Margareta Keszeg	15:08.0
1993	4 April	Craiova	Augustin Barbu	38:00.8	Iulia Olteanu	14:46.9
1994	20 February	Băile Felix	Niculae Negru	37:21.7	Mariana Chirila	20:21
1995	11 November	Craiova	Ion Avramescu		Daniela Petrescu	
1996	4 February	Băile Felix	Niculae Negru	37:42.1	Lelia Deselnicu	20:43.9
1997	8 November	Craiova	Niculae Negru	36:35.2	Elena Antoci	19:40.1
1998	7 November	Sfântu Gheorghe	Petre Hristea	37:43	Constantina Diță	27:36
1999	7 November	Craiova	Niculae Negru	31:49	Iulia Olteanu	28:36
2000	4 November	Sfântu Gheorghe	Adrian Maghiar	31:14	Mihaela Botezan	19:42
2001	4 November	Sfântu Gheorghe	Adrian Maghiar	29:55.4	Elena Fidatov	19:18.6
2002	9 November	Craiova	Mircea Bogdan	31:01	Daniela Petrescu	20:21
2003	8 November	Craiova	Adrian Maghiar	30:47	Maria Cristina Grosu-Mazilu	23:07
2004	6 November	Craiova	Adrian Maghiar		Mihaela Botezan	
2005	5 November	Craiova	Marius Ionescu	29:57.9	Ana-Maria Bordea	19:51.9
2006	4 November	Craiova	Adrian Maghiar	30:19.3	Paula Todoran	20:08.0
2007	3 November	Botoșani	Marius Ionescu	37:20.7	Elena Timpau	29:46.6
2008	1 November	Craiova	Marius Ionescu	36:49.6	Paula Todoran	27:37.3
2009	31 October	Giurgiu	Marius Ionescu		Ancuța Bobocel	
2010	30 October	Băile Felix	Marius Ionescu		Ancuța Bobocel	
2011	3 March	Băile Felix	Marius Ionescu		Cristiana-Alexandra Frumuz	
2012	17 March	Băile Felix	Nicolae Soare		Ancuța Bobocel	
2013	2 March	Botoșani	Marius Ionescu	34:11.1	Cristiana-Alexandra Frumuz	29:35.5

=== Short race winners ===
Year	Men's winner	Time	Women's winner	Time
1958	Zoltan Vamoș	12:17	Georgeta Dumitrescu	3:04
1959	Zoltan Vamoș	11:40	Not held	
1998	Florin Ionescu	11:52	Constantina Diță	18:56
1999	Ovidiu Tat	12:10	Iulia Olteanu	17:16
2000	Gabriel Andreescu	11:28	Elena Fidatov	12:53
2002	Ovidiu Olteanu	11:57	Maria Cristina Grosu-Mazilu	13:14
2003	Adrian Maghiar	11:47	Maria Cristina Grosu-Mazilu	13:07
2004	Adrian Maghiar	?	Mihaela Botezan	?
2005	Marius Ionescu	11:24.5	Ana-Maria Bordea	13:07.6
2006	Ciprian Suhanea	11:33.7	Ancuța Bobocel	12:52.6
