= Viorica Ghican =

Romanian runner (born 1965)

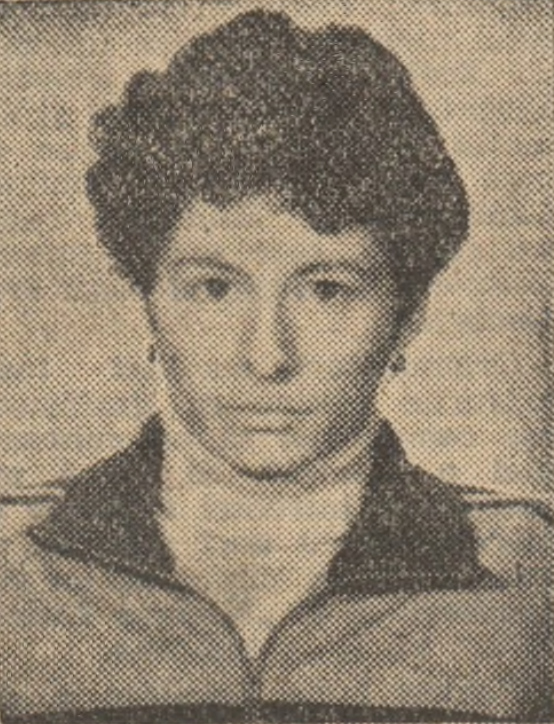

Personal information
- Born: 9 June 1965 (age 61) Târgu Jiu, Romania

Sport
- Country: Romania
- Sport: Athletics
- Event: Long-distance running
- Retired: 1998

Achievements and titles
- Personal bests: 1500 m: 4:02.76 (1988); 3000 m: 8:42.39 (1988); 5000 m: 15:09.90 (1990); 10,000 m: 31:18.18 (1990)
Medal record
Representing Romania
Summer Universiade
Gold medal – first place	1989 Duisburg	10,000m
Silver medal – second place	1989 Duisburg	3000m

Viorica Dima Ghican (born 9 June 1965) is a Romanian female former distance runner who competed over distances from 1500 metres to 10,000 metres. She competed in track, road and cross country running disciplines. She was the gold medallist in the 10,000 m at the 1989 Summer Universiade, setting a games record in the process. Among her other individual honours were gold medals at the Balkan Athletics Championships and World University Cross Country Championships in 1988, and silver medals at the 1990 Goodwill Games and 1989 European Cup.

Ghican represented Romania five times at the IAAF World Cross Country Championships from 1986 to 1997, with her best performances being eighth place in the 1990 senior women's race and a team bronze medal at the 1996 competition. She also won international honours in ekiden (marathon relays), including individual and team wins at the Barcelona Ekiden and International Chiba Ekiden in 1990.

Her personal best time of 31:18.18 minutes for the 10,000 m was the fastest time in the world in the 1990 season. This was a Romanian national record until 2002, when it was beaten by Mihaela Botezan. Although she continues to rank high on the Romanian lists, she never won a national title as she was overshadowed by contemporaries such as Olympic champions Maricica Puică and Paula Ivan (who beat her to the 3000 m gold at the 1989 Universiade), as well as Elena Murgoci, Iulia Olteanu and Elena Fidatov among others in a high point for Romanian women's distance running.

On the track and field circuit she won races at the Janusz Kusociński Memorial (1987), and the Meadowlands Invitational, Meeting de Paris, Meeting de Atletismo Sevilla and Helsinki Grand Prix in 1990. She was third in the 5000 m at the 1990 IAAF Grand Prix Final, which resulted in her placing second behind PattiSue Plumer in the series rankings.

She grew up in Târgu Jiu and was part of a successful group of local runners training under coach Ion Bură, which included Constantina Diță, Luminița Gogârlea and Ion Avramescu. She later fell out with Bură and became a running coach herself at CS Pandurii Târgu Jiu, though she spoke highly of him and his training methods. She married Marcel Dima, a former footballer and referee.

== International competitions ==
Year	Competition	Venue	Position	Event	Notes
1986	World Cross Country Championships	Colombier, Switzerland	73rd	Senior race	16:07.4
1986	World Cross Country Championships	Colombier, Switzerland	8th	Team	140 pts
1987	European Cup B Final	Gothenburg, Sweden	4th	10,000 m	32:54.88
1988	World University Cross Country Championships	Bologna, Italy	1st	Senior race	18:42
1988	World University Cross Country Championships	Bologna, Italy	1st	Team	
1988	Balkan Championships	Ankara, Turkey	2nd	1500 m	4:06.58
1988	Balkan Championships	Ankara, Turkey	1st	3000 m	9:07.99
1989	European Cup	Gateshead, United Kingdom	2nd	10,000 m	32:41.34
1989	Universiade	Duisburg, Germany	2nd	3000 m	8:46.27
1989	Universiade	Duisburg, Germany	1st	10,000 m	31:46.43
1990	European Indoor Championships	Glasgow, United Kingdom	4th	3000 m	9:00.92
1990	World Cross Country Championships	Aix-les-Bains, France	8th	Senior race	19:47
1990	World Cross Country Championships	Aix-les-Bains, France	4th	Team	102 pts
1990	Goodwill Games	Seattle, United States	2nd	10,000 m	15:27.77
1990	European Championships	Split, Yugoslavia	13th	10,000 m	32:55.18
1990	International Chiba Ekiden	Chiba, Japan	1st	10K	32:10
1990	International Chiba Ekiden	Chiba, Japan	1st	Team	
1990	Barcelona Ekiden	Barcelona, Spain	1st	10K	34:00
1990	Barcelona Ekiden	Barcelona, Spain	1st	Team	
1991	World Cross Country Championships	Antwerp, Belgium	25th	Senior race	21:16
1991	World Cross Country Championships	Antwerp, Belgium	7th	Team	148 pts
1991	Yokohama International Women's Ekiden	Yokohama, Japan	1st	7.2K	22:43
1996	World Cross Country Championships	Stellenbosch, South Africa	38th	Senior race	21:37
1996	World Cross Country Championships	Stellenbosch, South Africa	3rd	Team	70 pts
1996	Yokohama International Women's Ekiden	Yokohama, Japan	13th	10K	34:18
1996	Beijing International Women's Ekiden	Beijing, China	3rd	5K	16:40
1996	International Chiba Ekiden	Chiba, Japan	2nd	5.2K	17:19
1997	World Cross Country Championships	Turin, Italy	84th	Senior race	22:50
1997	World Cross Country Championships	Turin, Italy	11th	Team	189 pts
1997	Balkan Championships	Athens, Greece	2nd	1500 m	4:10.52
