= Mariana Chirilă =

Romanian runner

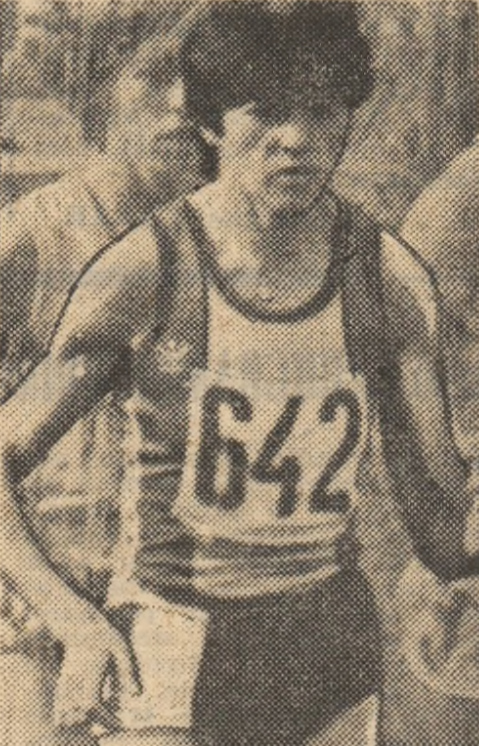

Personal information
- Born: 7 September 1964 (age 61)

Sport
- Country: Romania
- Sport: Athletics
- Retired: 2001

Achievements and titles
- National finals: 4 cross country titles
- Highest world ranking: 8th in 3000 m (1986)
- Personal best: 3000 m: 8:38.83 (1986)
Medal record
Goodwill Games
Gold medal – first place	1986 Moscow	3000 m
World Cross Country Championships
Bronze medal – third place	1985 Lisbon	Team
Bronze medal – third place	1996 Stellenbosch	Team
European Cross Country Championships
Gold medal – first place	1994 Alnwick	Team
Silver medal – second place	1997 Oeiras	Team

Mariana Chirilă (née Stănescu; born 7 September 1964) is a Romanian female distance runner who competed in events ranging from 800 metres to the marathon. Individually she won gold medals in the 3000 metres at the 1986 Goodwill Games and the 1992 Balkan Athletics Championships, and won the senior race at the Balkan Cross Country Championships in 1985. She represented her country at the European Athletics Championships in 1986, twice at the Universiade (1987 and 1991), and twice at the IAAF World Women's Road Race Championships (1984 and 1990). Her highest global ranking was eighth in the 3000 m for the 1986 season.

Chirilă had most of her success with Romanian women's teams at international events in cross country and road running. She was a seven-time participant at the IAAF World Cross Country Championships from 1985 to 1997, including team bronze medals in 1985 (alongside Fița Lovin, Elena Fidatov, and Olympic champion Paula Ivan) and 1996 (alongside Gabriela Szabo, Fidatov and Iulia Olteanu). She ran three times at the European Cross Country Championships and scored points to bring Romania to the team title with Fidatov and Margareta Keszeg in 1994, as well as a team silver with Fidatov and Stela Olteanu in 1997. She had much success at the Balkan Cross Country Championships, taking the individual gold in 1985, silver in 1986, 1987 and 1994, as well as perfect-score team titles in all those years with runners including Fidatov, Ivan and Luminita Gogirlea.

In road running, Chirilă competed many times for Romania in ekiden marathon relays. She won minor team medals at three consecutive editions of the IAAF World Road Relay Championships from 1994 to 1998, sharing the honours with Daniela Petrescu, Alina Gherasim, Anuța Cătună, Florina Pană and Olympic champion Constantina Diță among others. Other outings in the marathon relay resulted in victories at the International Chiba Ekiden and Barcelona Ekiden in 1990 and second place finishes twice at both the Yokohama International Women's Ekiden and Beijing International Women's Ekiden.

At national level, she was a four-time winner at the Romanian Cross Country Championships, winning three straight titles from 1985 to 1987 and a final win in 1994. At the Romanian Athletics Championships, she was runner-up over 10,000 metres in 1985 and over 3000 m in 1994. She also had top three finishes in the 3000 m at the 1986 Romanian Indoor Athletics Championships and at the 2001 Romanian Half Marathon Championships. On the professional circuit she won at the 1997 Le Lion Half Marathon and 1998 Belfast International Cross Country. She ran at the Debno Marathon in 1990 but did not take on the distance for a second time, after finishing in eighth in 2:52:51 hours.

== International competitions ==
Year	Competition	Venue	Position	Event	Notes
1984	World Women's Road Race Championships	Madrid, Spain	48th	10K	38:28
1985	Balkan Cross Country Championships		1st	Senior race	13:20.7
1985	Balkan Cross Country Championships		1st	Team	6 pts
1985	World Cross Country Championships	Lisbon, Portugal	48th	Senior race	16:16
1985	World Cross Country Championships	Lisbon, Portugal	3rd	Team	96 pts
1986	Balkan Cross Country Championships		2nd	Senior race	13:51.1
1986	Balkan Cross Country Championships		1st	Team	6 pts
1986	World Cross Country Championships	Colombier, Switzerland	31st	Senior race	15:40.3
1986	World Cross Country Championships	Colombier, Switzerland	8th	Team	140 pts
1986	Goodwill Games	Moscow, Soviet Union	1st	3000 m	8:38.83
1986	Goodwill Games	Moscow, Soviet Union	10th	5000 m	15:45.10
1986	European Championships	Stuttgart, West Germany	9th (heats)	3000 m	9:02:57
1987	Balkan Cross Country Championships		2nd	Senior race	12:35.7
1987	Balkan Cross Country Championships		1st	Team	6 pts
1987	World Cross Country Championships	Warsaw, Poland	6th	Senior race	17:04
1987	World Cross Country Championships	Warsaw, Poland	4th	Team	94 pts
1987	Universiade	Zagreb, Yugoslavia	8th	3000 m	9:13.07
1990	World Cross Country Championships	Aix-les-Bains, France	80th	Senior race	20:50
1990	World Cross Country Championships	Aix-les-Bains, France	4th	Team	102 pts
1990	World Women's Road Race Championships	Dublin, Ireland	46th	15K	53:39.1
1990	International Chiba Ekiden	Chiba, Japan	3rd	5K	16:29
1990	International Chiba Ekiden	Chiba, Japan	1st	Team	
1990	Barcelona Ekiden	Barcelona, Spain	6th	5.3K	19:00
1990	Barcelona Ekiden	Barcelona, Spain	1st	Team	
1991	World Cross Country Championships	Antwerp, Belgium	86th	Senior race	22:14
1991	World Cross Country Championships	Antwerp, Belgium	7th	Team	148 pts
1991	Universiade	Sheffield, United Kingdom	13th	10,000 m	34:06.01
1991	Yokohama International Women's Ekiden	Yokohama, Japan	6th	10K	33:25
1991	Yokohama International Women's Ekiden	Yokohama, Japan	2nd	Marathon relay	2:18:12
1992	Balkan Championships	Sofia, Bulgaria	1st	3000 m	9:17.92
1994	Balkan Cross Country Championships		2nd	Senior race	12:44.4
1994	Balkan Cross Country Championships		1st	Team	6 pts
1994	World Road Relay Championships	Litochoro, Greece	2nd	5K	16:02
1994	World Road Relay Championships	Litochoro, Greece	3rd	Marathon relay	2:19:18
1994	European Cross Country Championships	Alnwick, United Kingdom	7th	Senior race	14:48
1994	European Cross Country Championships	Alnwick, United Kingdom	1st	Team	26 pts
1995	Yokohama International Women's Ekiden	Yokohama, Japan	8th	10K	34:02
1995	Yokohama International Women's Ekiden	Yokohama, Japan	?	Marathon relay	
1995	Beijing International Women's Ekiden	Beijing, China	5th	5K	16:30
1995	Beijing International Women's Ekiden	Beijing, China	2nd	Marathon relay	2:17:10
1995	International Chiba Ekiden	Chiba, Japan	3rd	7K	23:40
1995	International Chiba Ekiden	Chiba, Japan	3rd	Marathon relay	2:20:26
1995	European Cross Country Championships	Alnwick, United Kingdom	25th	Senior race	14:38
1995	European Cross Country Championships	Alnwick, United Kingdom	2nd	Team	23 pts
1996	Yokohama International Women's Ekiden	Yokohama, Japan	2nd	7.2K	23:06
1996	Yokohama International Women's Ekiden	Yokohama, Japan	2nd	Marathon relay	2:16:35
1996	Beijing International Women's Ekiden	Beijing, China	2nd	10K	33:50
1996	Beijing International Women's Ekiden	Beijing, China	2nd	Marathon relay	
1996	World Cross Country Championships	Stellenbosch, South Africa	32nd	Senior race	21:26
1996	World Cross Country Championships	Stellenbosch, South Africa	3rd	Team	70 pts
1996	World Road Relay Championships	Copenhagen, Denmark	5th	10K	33:21
1996	World Road Relay Championships	Copenhagen, Denmark	2nd	Marathon relay	2:18:41
1996	International Chiba Ekiden	Chiba, Japan	6th	10K	32:33
1996	International Chiba Ekiden	Chiba, Japan	3rd	Marathon relay	2:17:48
1997	World Cross Country Championships	Turin, Italy	32nd	Senior race	22:25
1997	World Cross Country Championships	Turin, Italy	11th	Team	189 pts
1997	European Cross Country Championships	Oeiras, Portugal	5th	Senior race	18:10
1997	European Cross Country Championships	Oeiras, Portugal	2nd	Team	22 pts
1998	World Road Relay Championships	Manaus, Brazil	3rd	5K	17:15
1998	World Road Relay Championships	Manaus, Brazil	3rd	Team	2:24:13

== National titles ==
- Romanian Cross Country Championships: 1985, 1986, 1987, 1994

== Circuit wins ==
- Cross Internacional del Calzado: 1997
- Le Lion Half Marathon: 1997
- Antrim International Cross Country: 1998

== Personal bests ==
- 800 metres – 2:00.49 (1986)
- 1500 metres – 4:06.67 (1987)
- Mile run – 4:25.52 (1986)
- 3000 metres – 8:38.83 (1986)
- 5000 metres – 15:41.36 (1986)
- Half marathon – 1:12:36 (1997)
- Marathon – 2:52:51 (1990)
