= 1996 IAAF World Cross Country Championships – Senior women's race =

Senior women's race at the 1996 IAAF World Cross Country Championships
- Organisers: IAAF
- Edition: 24th
- Date: March 23
- Host city: Stellenbosch, Western Cape, South Africa
- Venue: Danie Craven Stadium
- Events: 1
- Distances: 6.3 km – Senior women
- Participation: 133 athletes from 37 nations

The Senior women's race at the 1996 IAAF World Cross Country Championships was held in Stellenbosch, South Africa, at the Danie Craven Stadium on March 23, 1996. A preview on the event was given in the Herald, and a report in The New York Times.

Complete results, medallists, and the results of British athletes were published.

== Race results ==
=== Senior women's race (6.3 km) ===
==== Individual ====
| Rank | Athlete | Country | Time |
|---|---|---|---|
| 1st place, gold medalist(s) | Gete Wami | Ethiopia | 20:12 |
| 2nd place, silver medalist(s) | Rose Cheruiyot | Kenya | 20:18 |
| 3rd place, bronze medalist(s) | Naomi Mugo | Kenya | 20:21 |
| 4 | Derartu Tulu | Ethiopia | 20:21 |
| 5 | Colleen de Reuck | South Africa | 20:21 |
| 6 | Fernanda Ribeiro | Portugal | 20:23 |
| 7 | Julia Vaquero | Spain | 20:28 |
| 8 | Jane Ngotho | Kenya | 20:31 |
| 9 | Gabriela Szabo | Romania | 20:37 |
| 10 | Berhane Adere | Ethiopia | 20:37 |
| 11 | Sally Barsosio | Kenya | 20:43 |
| 12 | Iulia Negura | Romania | 20:55 |
| 13 | Catherina McKiernan | Ireland | 20:57 |
| 14 | Farida Fatès | France | 21:02 |
| 15 | Florence Barsosio | Kenya | 21:04 |
| 16 | Kate Anderson | Australia | 21:08 |
| 17 | Elena Fidatof | Romania | 21:08 |
| 18 | Chiemi Takahashi | Japan | 21:12 |
| 19 | Paula Radcliffe | United Kingdom | 21:13 |
| 20 | Odile Ohier | France | 21:14 |
| 21 | Kylie Risk | Australia | 21:17 |
| 22 | Hiromi Masuda | Japan | 21:17 |
| 23 | Marie McMahon | Ireland | 21:18 |
| 24 | Annette Sergent | France | 21:18 |
| 25 | Joan Nesbit | United States | 21:19 |
| 26 | Carmen Fuentes | Spain | 21:21 |
| 27 | Margaret Crowley | Australia | 21:21 |
| 28 | Carolyn Schuwalov | Australia | 21:22 |
| 29 | Getenesh Urge | Ethiopia | 21:22 |
| 30 | Stefanija Statkuvienė | Lithuania | 21:23 |
| 31 | Albertina Dias | Portugal | 21:23 |
| 32 | Mariana Chirila | Romania | 21:26 |
| 33 | Ana Dias | Portugal | 21:30 |
| 34 | Conceição Ferreira | Portugal | 21:32 |
| 35 | Annemarie Danneels | Belgium | 21:34 |
| 36 | Silvia Skvortsova | Russia | 21:35 |
| 37 | Beatriz Santíago | Spain | 21:36 |
| 38 | Viorica Ghican | Romania | 21:37 |
| 39 | Miki Kitashima | Japan | 21:40 |
| 40 | Melissa Moon | New Zealand | 21:41 |
| 41 | Lelia Deselnicu | Romania | 21:41 |
| 42 | Gwen Griffiths | South Africa | 21:43 |
| 43 | Asha Gigi | Ethiopia | 21:43 |
| 44 | Natalie Harvey | Australia | 21:43 |
| 45 | Yoshiko Imura | Japan | 21:46 |
| 46 | Teresa Recio | Spain | 21:47 |
| 47 | Ana Correia | Portugal | 21:48 |
| 48 | Liz Wilson | United States | 21:49 |
| 49 | Vikki McPherson | United Kingdom | 21:49 |
| 50 | Nadezhda Tatarenkova | Russia | 21:50 |
| 51 | Anne Hare | New Zealand | 21:50 |
| 52 | Carole Zajac | United States | 21:53 |
| 53 | Laurence Duquénoy | France | 21:53 |
| 54 | Gabrielle Vijverberg | Netherlands | 21:54 |
| 55 | Miwa Sugawara | Japan | 21:57 |
| 56 | Maree Bunce | New Zealand | 21:57 |
| 57 | Kore Alemu | Ethiopia | 21:57 |
| 58 | Angie Hulley | United Kingdom | 21:58 |
| 59 | Zola Pieterse | South Africa | 21:59 |
| 60 | Carlien Cornelissen | South Africa | 22:00 |
| 61 | Sonia Barry | New Zealand | 22:04 |
| 62 | Zahra Ouaziz | Morocco | 22:08 |
| 63 | Alison Wyeth | United Kingdom | 22:10 |
| 64 | Andrea Whitcombe | United Kingdom | 22:14 |
| 65 | Anja Smolders | Belgium | 22:15 |
| 66 | Nuria Pastor | Spain | 22:16 |
| 67 | Joalsiae Llado | France | 22:18 |
| 68 | Mieke Aanen | Netherlands | 22:20 |
| 69 | Teresa Duffy | Ireland | 22:22 |
| 70 | Patrizia Di Napoli | Italy | 22:23 |
| 71 | Nadezhda Galyamova | Russia | 22:24 |
| 72 | Jana Klimesová | Czech Republic | 22:25 |
| 73 | Christine Mallo | France | 22:30 |
| 74 | Agata Balsamo | Italy | 22:32 |
| 75 | Lukose Leelamma | India | 22:32 |
| 76 | Paulina Phaho | South Africa | 22:32 |
| 77 | Clair Fearnley | Australia | 22:33 |
| 78 | Kristijna Loonen | Netherlands | 22:35 |
| 79 | Anne Keenan-Buckley | Ireland | 22:37 |
| 80 | Lornah Kiplagat | Kenya | 22:40 |
| 81 | Rosanna Martin | Italy | 22:42 |
| 82 | Nelly Glauser | Switzerland | 22:43 |
| 83 | Patrizia Ragno | Italy | 22:45 |
| 84 | Kristen Hall | United States | 22:45 |
| 85 | Isabel Carreno | Mexico | 22:48 |
| 86 | Elisabeth Mongudhi | Namibia | 22:48 |
| 87 | Taeko Terauchi | Japan | 22:50 |
| 88 | Erica van der Bilt | Netherlands | 22:51 |
| 89 | Elisa Rea | Italy | 22:51 |
| 90 | Samukeliso Moyo | Zimbabwe | 22:54 |
| 91 | Restituta Joseph | Tanzania | 23:04 |
| 92 | Grethe Koens | Netherlands | 23:08 |
| 93 | Nadir de Siqueira | Brazil | 23:08 |
| 94 | Ana Elias | Angola | 23:10 |
| 95 | Maureen Harrington | Ireland | 23:14 |
| 96 | Liz Talbot | United Kingdom | 23:14 |
| 97 | Lyudmila Derevyankina | Russia | 23:16 |
| 98 | Verónica Páez | Argentina | 23:19 |
| 99 | Charné Rademeyer | South Africa | 23:22 |
| 100 | Maimuna Margwe | Tanzania | 23:23 |
| 101 | Sibelia Vasconcelos | Brazil | 23:24 |
| 102 | Vally Satayabhama | India | 23:25 |
| 103 | Marvelous Kativhu | Zimbabwe | 23:30 |
| 104 | Sicalile Moyo | Zimbabwe | 23:31 |
| 105 | Paola Testa | Italy | 23:31 |
| 106 | Maria Fernández | Argentina | 23:33 |
| 107 | Monica Samila | Tanzania | 23:34 |
| 108 | Rani Saini | India | 23:34 |
| 109 | Mardrea Hyman | Jamaica | 23:42 |
| 110 | Luciene de Deus | Brazil | 23:50 |
| 111 | Madhuri Saxena | India | 23:53 |
| 112 | Jorilda Sabino | Brazil | 24:01 |
| 113 | Tuelo Setswamorago | Botswana | 24:04 |
| 114 | Zulma Ortíz | Argentina | 24:05 |
| 115 | Esther Nherera | Zimbabwe | 24:15 |
| 116 | Lucy Nusrala | United States | 24:31 |
| 117 | Sandra Torres | Argentina | 24:38 |
| 118 | Angelina Pitso | Lesotho | 24:48 |
| 119 | Neelo Phutegelo | Botswana | 24:49 |
| 120 | Evette Turner | Jamaica | 24:52 |
| 121 | Tijana Pavicic | Yugoslavia | 25:42 |
| 122 | Rasheda Amer | Egypt | 25:50 |
| 123 | Sarah Changati | Botswana | 26:09 |
| 124 | Nicole Carty | Jamaica | 26:22 |
| 125 | Hsu Yu-Fang | Chinese Taipei | 26:30 |
| 126 | Guylene Duval | Mauritius | 26:33 |
| 127 | Karen Smith | Jamaica | 27:23 |
| 128 | Onkemetse Solotate | Botswana | 27:39 |
| 129 | Hussein Hawa | Tanzania | 27:51 |
| — | Kathy Butler | Canada | DNF |
| — | María Isabel Martinez | Spain | DNF |
| — | Manuela Dias | Portugal | DNF |
| — | Geraldine Macdonald | New Zealand | DNF |

==== Teams ====
| Rank | Team | Points |
|---|---|---|
| 1st place, gold medalist(s) | Kenya: Rose Cheruiyot / 2; Naomi Mugo / 3; Jane Ngotho / 8; Sally Barsosio / 11; (Florence Barsosio) / (15); (Lornah Kiplagat) / (80) | 24 |
| 2nd place, silver medalist(s) | Ethiopia: Gete Wami / 1; Derartu Tulu / 4; Berhane Adere / 10; Getenesh Urge / 29; (Asha Gigi) / (43); (Kore Alemu) / (57) | 44 |
| 3rd place, bronze medalist(s) | Romania: Gabriela Szabo / 9; Iulia Negura / 12; Elena Fidatof / 17; Mariana Chirila / 32; (Viorica Ghican) / (38); (Lelia Deselnicu) / (41) | 70 |
| 4 | Australia: Kate Anderson / 16; Kylie Risk / 21; Margaret Crowley / 27; Carolyn Schuwalov / 28; (Natalie Harvey) / (44); (Clair Fearnley) / (77) | 92 |
| 5 | Portugal: Fernanda Ribeiro / 6; Albertina Dias / 31; Ana Dias / 33; Conceição Ferreira / 34; (Ana Correia) / (47); (Manuela Dias) / (DNF) | 104 |
| 6 | France: Farida Fatès / 14; Odile Ohier / 20; Annette Sergent / 24; Laurence Duquénoy / 53; (Joalsiae Llado) / (67); (Christine Mallo) / (73) | 111 |
| 7 | Spain: Julia Vaquero / 7; Carmen Fuentes / 26; Beatriz Santíago / 37; Teresa Recio / 46; (Nuria Pastor) / (66); (María Isabel Martinez) / (DNF) | 116 |
| 8 | Japan: Chiemi Takahashi / 18; Hiromi Masuda / 22; Miki Kitashima / 39; Yoshiko Imura / 45; (Miwa Sugawara) / (55); (Taeko Terauchi) / (87) | 124 |
| 9 | South Africa: Colleen de Reuck / 5; Gwen Griffiths / 42; Zola Pieterse / 59; Carlien Cornelissen / 60; (Paulina Phaho) / (76); (Charné Rademeyer) / (99) | 166 |
| 10 | Ireland: Catherina McKiernan / 13; Marie McMahon / 23; Teresa Duffy / 69; Anne Keenan-Buckley / 79; (Maureen Harrington) / (95) | 184 |
| 11 | United Kingdom: Paula Radcliffe / 19; Vikki McPherson / 49; Angie Hulley / 58; Alison Wyeth / 63; (Andrea Whitcombe) / (64); (Liz Talbot) / (96) | 189 |
| 12 | New Zealand: Melissa Moon / 40; Anne Hare / 51; Maree Bunce / 56; Sonia Barry / 61; (Geraldine Macdonald) / (DNF) | 208 |
| 13 | United States: Joan Nesbit / 25; Liz Wilson / 48; Carole Zajac / 52; Kristen Hall / 84; (Lucy Nusrala) / (116) | 209 |
| 14 | Russia: Silvia Skvortsova / 36; Nadezhda Tatarenkova / 50; Nadezhda Galyamova / 71; Lyudmila Derevyankina / 97 | 254 |
| 15 | Netherlands: Gabrielle Vijverberg / 54; Mieke Aanen / 68; Kristijna Loonen / 78; Erica van der Bilt / 88; (Grethe Koens) / (92) | 288 |
| 16 | Italy: Patrizia Di Napoli / 70; Agata Balsamo / 74; Rosanna Martin / 81; Patrizia Ragno / 83; (Elisa Rea) / (89); (Paola Testa) / (105) | 308 |
| 17 | India: Lukose Leelamma / 75; Vally Satayabhama / 102; Rani Saini / 108; Madhuri Saxena / 111 | 396 |
| 18 | Zimbabwe: Samukeliso Moyo / 90; Marvelous Kativhu / 103; Sicalile Moyo / 104; Esther Nherera / 115 | 412 |
| 19 | Brazil: Nadir de Siqueira / 93; Sibelia Vasconcelos / 101; Luciene de Deus / 110; Jorilda Sabino / 112 | 416 |
| 20 | Tanzania: Restituta Joseph / 91; Maimuna Margwe / 100; Monica Samila / 107; Hussein Hawa / 129 | 427 |
| 21 | Argentina: Verónica Páez / 98; Maria Fernández / 106; Zulma Ortíz / 114; Sandra Torres / 117 | 435 |
| 22 | Jamaica: Mardrea Hyman / 109; Evette Turner / 120; Nicole Carty / 124; Karen Smith / 127 | 480 |
| 23 | Botswana: Tuelo Setswamorago / 113; Neelo Phutegelo / 119; Sarah Changati / 123; Onkemetse Solotate / 128 | 483 |

- Note: Athletes in parentheses did not score for the team result

== Participation ==
An unofficial count yields the participation of 133 athletes from 37 countries in the Senior women's race. This is in agreement with the official numbers as published.

- Angola (1)
- Argentina (4)
- Australia (6)
- Belgium (2)
- Botswana (4)
- Brazil (4)
- Canada (1)
- Chinese Taipei (1)
- Czech Republic (1)
- Egypt (1)
- Ethiopia (6)
- France (6)
- India (4)
- Ireland (5)
- Italy (6)
- Jamaica (4)
- Japan (6)
- Kenya (6)
- Lesotho (1)
- Lithuania (1)
- Mauritius (1)
- Mexico (1)
- Morocco (1)
- Namibia (1)
- Netherlands (5)
- New Zealand (5)
- Portugal (6)
- Romania (6)
- Russia (4)
- South Africa (6)
- Spain (6)
- Switzerland (1)
- Tanzania (4)
- United Kingdom (6)
- United States (5)
- Yugoslavia (1)
- Zimbabwe (4)

== See also ==
- 1996 IAAF World Cross Country Championships – Senior men's race
- 1996 IAAF World Cross Country Championships – Junior men's race
- 1996 IAAF World Cross Country Championships – Junior women's race
