= Takako Kotorida =

Japanese long-distance runner

Personal information
- Born: 2 April 1977 (age 49)

Sport
- Country: Japan
- Sport: Athletics
- Club: DEODEO

Achievements and titles
- Personal best(s): Half marathon: 1:08:45; Marathon: 2:32:15
Medal record
East Asian Games
Silver medal – second place	2001 Osaka	Half marathon

Takako Kotorida (小鳥田 貴子, Kotorida Takako) (born 2 April 1977) is a Japanese former long-distance runner. She was a member of DEODEO Athletic Club for Women. She represented her country at the 2002 Asian Games and placed fourth in the women's 10,000 metres. As part of the Japanese national marathon relay team, she was winner of the Yokohama International Women's Ekiden in 1999 and 2000, and was the Beijing International Ekiden champion in 2001. She competed at the IAAF World Half Marathon Championships on three occasions and was part of Japan's silver medal-winning women's team in both 2001 and 2003. Kotorida was a silver medallist in the half marathon at the 2001 East Asian Games.

== Competition record ==
Year	Competition	Venue	Position	Event	Notes
1999	Yokohama International Women's Ekiden	Yokohama, Japan	1st	Ekiden	4th leg
2000	Yokohama International Women's Ekiden	Yokohama, Japan	1st	Ekiden	3rd leg
	Gold Coast Marathon	Gold Coast, Australia	1st	Half marathon	
	All Japan Women's Ekiden	Gifu, Japan	6th	Ekiden	3rd leg
2001	Hyogo Relay Carnival	Kobe, Japan	1st	10,000 m	
	Beijing International Ekiden	Beijing, China	1st	Ekiden	2nd leg
	Great Scottish Half Marathon	Glasgow, United Kingdom	3rd	Half marathon	
	All Japan Women's Ekiden	Gifu, Japan	5th	Ekiden	5th leg
2002	Beijing International Ekiden	Beijing, China	2nd	Ekiden	3rd leg
	Hyogo Relay Carnival	Kobe, Japan	2nd	10,000 m	
	International Chiba Ekiden	Chiba, Japan	2nd	Ekiden	3rd leg
	Asian Games	Busan, South Korea	4th	10,000 m	
	National Sports Festival of Japan	Kōchi, Japan	1st	5000 m	
2003	Yokohama International Women's Ekiden	Yokohama, Japan	3rd	Ekiden	2nd leg
	Hyogo Relay Carnival	Kobe, Japan	2nd	10,000 m	
	Chugoku Women's Ekiden	Hiroshima, Japan	1st	Ekiden	5th leg
	All Japan Women's Ekiden	Gifu, Japan	8th	Ekiden	3rd leg
2004	International Chiba Ekiden	Chiba, Japan	2nd	Ekiden	2nd leg
	Osaka International Ladies Marathon	Osaka, Japan	8th	Marathon	
2005	Miyazaki Women's Road Race	Miyazaki, Japan	1st	5000 m	
	Kagawa Marugame Half Marathon	Yokohama, Japan	1st	Half Marathon	
