= Joalsiae Llado =

French long-distance runner

Medal record

Women's athletics

Representing France

European Cross Country Championships
Gold medal – first place	1997 Oeiras	Senior race
Gold medal – first place	1997 Oeiras	Team race

Joalsiae "Josiane" Llado-Kremmer (born 27 November 1974) is a French former long-distance runner who competed in distances ranging from 3000 metres to a marathon.

Her career briefly flourished between 1996 and 1999, with her sole major title coming at the 1997 European Cross Country Championships. She broke the French record in the 5000 metres twice in 1998, resulting in a lifetime best of 15:11.26 minutes.

== Career ==
Born in Bordeaux, Llado made her senior international debut at the 1996 IAAF World Cross Country Championships, where she came 67th in the senior race. She made her first impact in 1997 when she was the surprise gold medallist at the 1997 European Cross Country Championships, seeing off the more favoured Elena Fidatov and Olivera Jevtic by a margin of more than ten seconds. She also led the French women's team to the top of the team podium.

The 1998 season was the most active her career. She began with an appearance at the 1998 IAAF World Cross Country Championships, but failed to finish the distance. She took the first track medal of her career at the 1998 European Cup, finishing third in the 5000 metres for the bronze medal. She improved the French record for the event twice that year: first she ran 15:16.13 minutes at the Meeting Gaz de France in Paris, then improved this further to 15:11.26 minutes at the Golden Gala in Rome. She was chosen to represent France at the 1998 European Athletics Championships but she failed to finish the race. She featured at the 1998 IAAF Grand Prix Final in Moscow and came eighth in the 5000 m.

Llado made her debut over the marathon distance in 1999 and on her first attempt she won at the Marathon du Médoc, setting a course record of 2:38:34 hours. This proved to be the last outing of her career, as she retired in 2000.

Discussing the reasons for her retirement at her peak, she told sports journalist Pierre Morath is a 2008 television documentary Tu seras champion mon fils! that her father had pushed her to train as a young child at all costs. Her father continued as her coach into adulthood and she endured physical and sexual abuse by him. With her family reliant upon her athletics income, she felt unable to escape the situation but after her father emptied her bank accounts she fled to Lausanne, Switzerland to start a new life.

== Personal bests ==
- 3000 metres – 8:49.98 min (1998)
- 5000 metres – 15:11.26 min (1998)
- Five miles – 27:02.00 min (1998)
- Marathon – 2:38:34 hrs (1999)

== International competitions ==
Year	Competition	Venue	Position	Event	Notes
1996	World Cross Country Championships	Stellenbosch, South Africa	67th	Senior race	
1997	European Cross Country Championships	Oeiras, Portugal	1st	Senior race	
1997	European Cross Country Championships	Oeiras, Portugal	1st	Senior team	
1998	World Cross Country Championships	Marrakesh, Morocco	—	Senior race	DNF
1998	European Cup	Saint Petersburg, Russia	3rd	5000 m	
1998	European Championships	Budapest, Hungary	—	5000 metres	DNF
1998	IAAF Grand Prix Final	Moscow, Russia	8th	5000 metres	
1999	World Cross Country Championships	Belfast, United Kingdom	69th	Women's short race	
