= 1994 European Cross Country Championships =

International athletics competition

The 1st European Cross Country Championships were held at Alnwick in England on 10 December 1994. Paulo Guerra took the title in the men's competition and Catherina McKiernan won the women's race.

== Results ==
=== Men individual 9.5 km ===
Pos.	Runners	Time
1st place, gold medalist(s)	(Portugal) Paulo Guerra	27:43
2nd place, silver medalist(s)	(Portugal) Domingos Castro	27:59
3rd place, bronze medalist(s)	(Spain) Antonio Serrano	28:03
4.	(Spain) José Carlos Adán	28:06
5.	(France) Abdellah Béhar	28:08
6.	(Italy) Luca Barzaghi	28:10
7.	(Spain) José Manuel García	28:11
8.	(Portugal) António Pinto	28:12
9.	(Portugal) Alberto Maravilha	28:13
10.	(France) Mustapha Essaïd	28:19

Total 103 competitors

=== Men teams ===
Pos.	Team	Points
1st place, gold medalist(s)	Portugal; Paulo Guerra; Domingos Castro; António Pinto; Alberto Maravilha	20; 1; 2; 8; 9
2nd place, silver medalist(s)	Spain; Antonio Serrano; José Carlos Adán; José Manuel García; Alejandro Gómez	27; 3; 4; 7; 13
3rd place, bronze medalist(s)	France; Abdellah Béhar; Mustapha Essaïd; Mohamed Ezzher; Bertrand Frechard	50; 5; 10; 17; 18
4.	United Kingdom; Andrew Pearson; Barry Royden; Richard Nerurkar; Dave Lewis	77; 11; 14; 25; 27
5.	Italy; Luca Barzaghi; Vincenzo Modica; Eugenio Frangi; Paolo Donati	84; 6; 24; 26; 28
6.	Netherlands; Marco Gielson; Greg Van Hest; Kamiel Maase; Marcel Laros	132; 21; 31; 34; 46
7.	Russia	146
8.	Ireland	152

Total 21 teams

=== Women individual 4.5 km ===
Pos.	Runners	Time
1st place, gold medalist(s)	(Republic of Ireland) Catherina McKiernan	14:29
2nd place, silver medalist(s)	(Spain) Julia Vaquero	14:30
3rd place, bronze medalist(s)	(Romania) Elena Fidatov	14:43
4.	(Russia) Alla Zhilyaeva	14:45
5.	(France) Maria Rebelo	14:46
6.	(Portugal) Fernanda Ribeiro	14:47
7.	(Romania) Mariana Chirila-Stanescu	14:48
8.	(Belgium) Lieve Slegers	14:49
9.	(France) Blandine Bitzner-Ducret	14:50
10.	(Ukraine) Tamara Koba	14:51

Total 77 competitors

=== Women teams ===
Pos.	Team	Points
1st place, gold medalist(s)	Romania; Elena Fidatov; Mariana Chirila-Stanescu; Margareta Keszeg	26; 3; 7; 16
2nd place, silver medalist(s)	France; Maria Rebelo; Blandine Bitzner-Ducret; Farida Fates	28; 5; 9; 14
3rd place, bronze medalist(s)	Portugal; Fernanda Ribeiro; Carla Sacramento; Ana Dias	29; 6; 11; 12
4.	Spain; Julia Vaquero; Rocio Rios; Carmen Fuentes	45; 2; 21; 22
5.	Italy; Flavia Gaviglio; Maria Curatolo; Nives Curti	62; 13; 19; 30
6.	Belgium; Lieve Slegers; Veronique Collard; Marleen Renders	64; 8; 18; 38
7.	Russia	73
8.	Ireland	75

Total 17 teams
