= Athletics at the 1989 Summer Universiade – Women's 10,000 metres =

The women's 10,000 metres event at the 1989 Summer Universiade was held at the Wedaustadion in Duisburg on 29 August 1989.

== Results ==
Rank	Athlete	Nationality	Time	Notes
1st place, gold medalist(s)	Viorica Ghican	Romania	31:46.43	
2nd place, silver medalist(s)	Masami Ishizaka	Japan	32:16.24	
3rd place, bronze medalist(s)	Lizanne Bussières	Canada	32:28.38	
4	Helen Titterington	Great Britain	32:36.09	
5	Allison Rabour	Italy	32:38.96	
6	Kerstin Preßler	West Germany	32:40.27	
7	Collette Murphy	United States	32:42.60	
8	Maria Guida	Italy	33:15.19	
9	Nadezhda Ilyina	Soviet Union	33:38.05	
10	Tijana Pavičić	Yugoslavia	34:12.77	
11	Heléna Barócsi	Hungary	34:14.15	
12	Teresa Recio	Spain	35:00.81	
13	Suzanne Jones	United States	35:32.03	
	Véronique Collard	Belgium	DNF	
	Claudia Borgschulze	West Germany	DNF	
