= 1997 European Cross Country Championships =

International athletics competition

The 4th European Cross Country Championships were held at Oeiras in Portugal on 14 December 1997. Danish orienteer Carsten Jørgensen took the title in the men's competition and Joalsiae Llado won the women's race.

== Results ==
=== Men individual 10km ===
Pos.	Runners	Time
1st place, gold medalist(s)	(Denmark) Carsten Jørgensen	27:19
2nd place, silver medalist(s)	(Sweden) Claes Nyberg	27:20
3rd place, bronze medalist(s)	(Ukraine) Serhiy Lebid	27:23
4.	(France) Mustapha Essaïd	27:30
5.	(Portugal) Alfredo Bras	27:32
6.	(Spain) José Manuel García	27:33
7.	(Spain) Julio Rey	27:33
8.	(Portugal) Domingos Castro	27:37
9.	(Portugal) José Regalo	27:38
10.	(Italy) Umberto Pusterla	27:42
11.	(France) Bertrand Frechand	27:42
12.	(Portugal) Alberto Maraviha	27:44

83 runners finished.

=== Men teams ===
Pos.	Team	Points
1st place, gold medalist(s)	Portugal; Alfredo Brás; Domingos Castro; José Regalo; Alberto Maravilha	34; 5; 8; 9; 12
2nd place, silver medalist(s)	France; Mustapha Essaïd; Bertrand Frechand; Yann Millon; Abdellah Béhar	46; 4; 11; 13; 18
3rd place, bronze medalist(s)	Spain; José Manuel García; Julio Rey; Isaac Viciosa; Víctor López	56; 6; 7; 20; 23
4.	Italy; Umberto Pusterla; Gabriele de Nard; Giuliano Battocletti; Vincenzo Modica	74; 10; 14; 19; 31
5.	Denmark; Carsten Jørgensen; Klaus Peter Hansen; Kaare Sörensen; Dennis Jensen	114; 1; 24; 41; 48
6.	United Kingdom; Dominic Bannister; Christopher Robinson; Dermot Donnelly; Christian Stephenson	117; 17; 25; 36; 39
7.	Netherlands	150
8.	Ireland	151

Total 15 teams

=== Women individual 5km ===
Pos.	Runners	Time
1st place, gold medalist(s)	(France) Joalsiae Llado	17:20
2nd place, silver medalist(s)	(Romania) Elena Fidatov	17:33
3rd place, bronze medalist(s)	(Serbia and Montenegro) Olivera Jevtić	17:37
4.	(Finland) Annemari Sandell	17:39
5.	(Romania) Mariana Chirila	18:10
6.	(Portugal) Helena Sampaio	18:14
7.	(France) Yanna Belkacem	18:15
8.	(Spain) Ana Isabel Alonso	18:15
9.	(Italy) Sabrina Varrone	18:19
10.	(Germany) Melanie Kraus	18:20
11.	(United Kingdom) Vicko MacPherson	18:27
12.	(France) Gabrielle Vijverberg	18:29

55 runners finished.

=== Women teams ===
Pos.	Team	Points
1st place, gold medalist(s)	France; Joalsiae Llado; Yanna Belkacem; Fatima Yvelain	21; 1; 7; 13
2nd place, silver medalist(s)	Romania; Elena Fidatov; Mariana Chirila; Stela Olteanu	22; 2; 5; 15
3rd place, bronze medalist(s)	Spain; Ana Isabel Alonso; Julia Vaquero; Jacqueline Martín	46; 8; 17; 21
4.	Portugal; Helena Sampaio; Ana Correia; Teresa Nunes	48; 6; 19; 23
5.	Italy; Sabrina Varrone; Flavia Gaviglio; Patriza Ragno	57; 9; 20; 28
6.	United Kingdom; Vicky Macpherson; Lucy Wright; Elizabeth Talbot	57; 11; 16; 30
7.	Belgium	78
8.	Russia	84

Total 11 teams

=== Junior men individual 5km ===
Pos.	Runners	Time
1st place, gold medalist(s)	(Netherlands) Gert-Jan Liefers	15:45
2nd place, silver medalist(s)	(Austria) Günther Weidlinger	15:50
3rd place, bronze medalist(s)	(Sweden) Mustafa Mohamed	16:00
4.	(Spain) Juan Carlos Higuero	16:02
5.	(United Kingdom) Sam Haughian	16:10
6.	(Spain) Juan Jose Lozano	16:19

58 runners finished.

=== Juniors men teams ===
Pos.	Team	Points
1st place, gold medalist(s)	Spain	19
2nd place, silver medalist(s)	Portugal	43
3rd place, bronze medalist(s)	Romania	48
4.	Italy	55
5.	Finland	66
6.	United Kingdom	77

Total 12 teams

=== Junior women individual 3km ===
Pos.	Runners	Time
1st place, gold medalist(s)	(Serbia and Montenegro) Sonja Stolić	9:09
2nd place, silver medalist(s)	(Portugal) Monica Rosa	9:15
3rd place, bronze medalist(s)	(Germany) Judith Heise	9:16
4.	(Germany) Larissa Kleinmann	9:19
5.	(Belgium) Catherine Lallemand	9:21
6.	(Slovenia) Sonja Roman	9:20

58 runners finished.

=== Junior women teams ===
Pos.	Team	Points
1st place, gold medalist(s)	Germany	15
2nd place, silver medalist(s)	Serbia and Montenegro	33
3rd place, bronze medalist(s)	United Kingdom	43
4.	Spain	49
5.	Portugal	53
6.	Finland	59
