= Athletics at the 2002 Asian Games – Women's 10,000 metres =

Women's 10,000 metres at the 2002 Asian Games
- Venue: Busan Asiad Main Stadium
- Dates: 8 October 2002
- Competitors: 7 from 4 nations

Medalists
gold medal	Sun Yingjie	China
silver medal	Kayoko Fukushi	Japan
bronze medal	Xing Huina	China

The women's 10000 metres competition at the 2002 Asian Games in Busan, South Korea was held on 8 October at the Busan Asiad Main Stadium.

== Schedule ==
All times are Korea Standard Time (UTC+09:00)

Date	Time	Event
Tuesday, 8 October 2002	16:45	Final

== Records ==
Prior to this competition, the existing world, Asian and Games records were as follows.

World Record	Wang Junxia (CHN)	29:31.78	Beijing, China	8 September 1993
Asian Record	Wang Junxia (CHN)	29:31.78	Beijing, China	8 September 1993
Games Record	Wang Junxia (CHN)	30:50.34	Hiroshima, Japan	15 October 1994

== Results ==
Rank	Athlete	Time	Notes
1st place, gold medalist(s)	Sun Yingjie (CHN)	30:28.26	GR
2nd place, silver medalist(s)	Kayoko Fukushi (JPN)	30:51.81	
3rd place, bronze medalist(s)	Xing Huina (CHN)	31:42.58	
4	Takako Kotorida (JPN)	31:52.65	
5	Chung Yun-hee (KOR)	32:46.54	
6	Maggie Chan (HKG)	32:56.35	
7	Chang Jin-sook (KOR)	34:18.21	
