= Allison Rabour =

Italian long-distance runner

Personal information
- National team: Italy (4 caps in 1989-1991)
- Born: 2 March 1967 (age 59) Rome, Italy

Sport
- Country: Italy
- Sport: Athletics
- Events: Long-distance running; Cross country running

Achievements and titles
- Personal best: Half marathon: 1:12:56 (1989)

Allison Rabour (born 2 March 1967) is a former Italian female long-distance runner who competed at individual senior level at the IAAF World Women's Road Race Championships and at the IAAF World Cross Country Championships (1989, 1991).

She was 5th at the 1989 Summer Universiade – Women's 10,000 metres.

== National titles ==
She won a national championships at the individual senior level.

- Italian Athletics Championships
  - Half marathon: 1989
