= Barcelona International Women's Ekiden =

Relay race held from 1989 to 1991

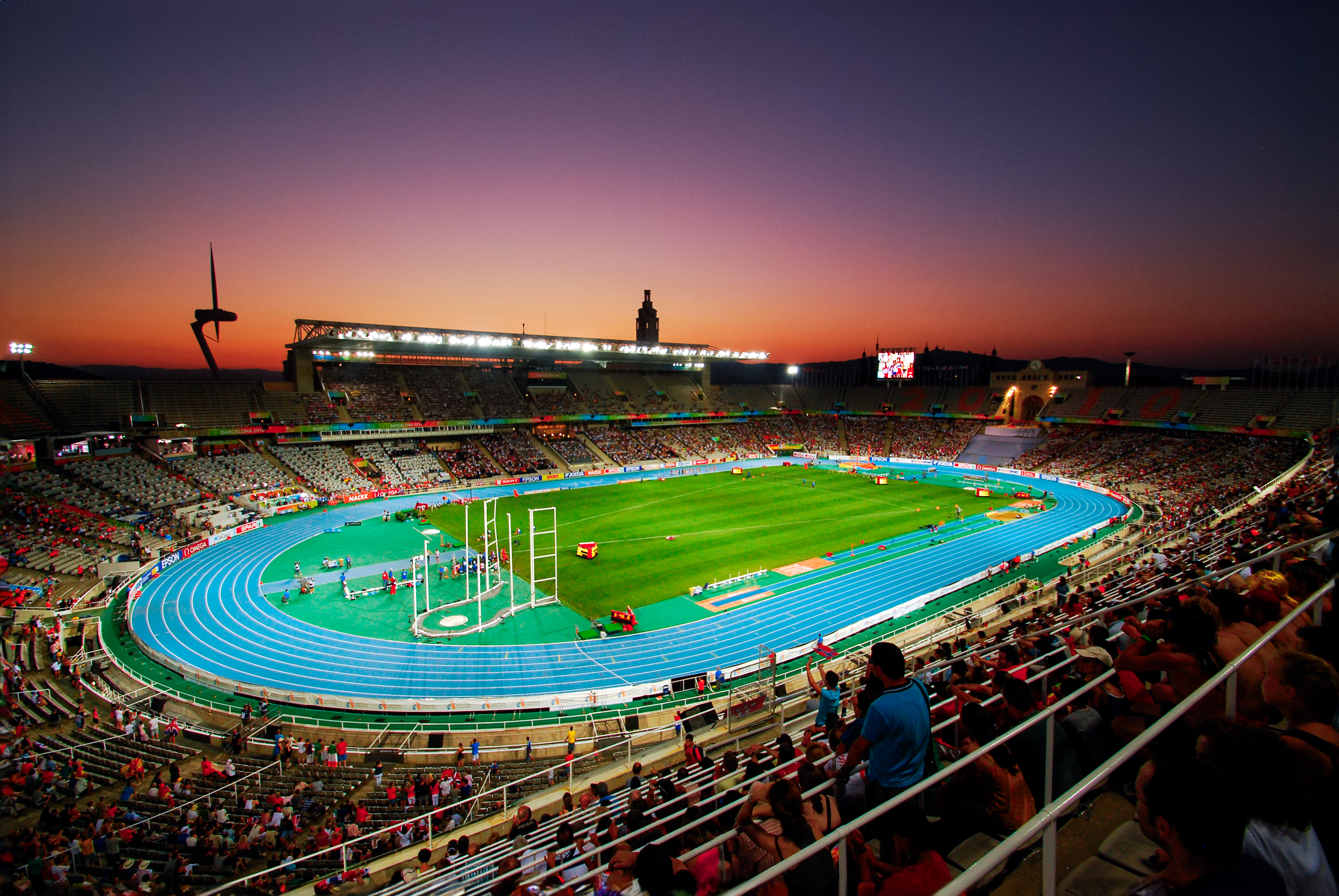
The Montjuic Stadium, where the Barcelona Ekiden finished

The Barcelona International Women's Ekiden (Japanese: 年 バルセロナ国際女子駅伝, Spanish: Ekiden de la Barcelona), also known as the Kagome International Women's Ekiden or the Barcelona Ekiden, was an international women's ekiden (marathon relay race) held on New Year's Eve in Barcelona in 1989, 1990, and 1991.

The competition was initiated in 1989. It was viewed by some as a way to prepare for the 1992 Summer Olympics also held in Barcelona – it ended at the Montjuic Stadium which was also the venue for athletics at the 1992 Summer Olympics. The travel for international teams was paid for by the Japanese organizers.

The course record of 2:13:59 hours was set by the Soviet Union in 1991.

== Winners ==
Barcelona International Women's Ekiden winning teams
| Ed. | Date | Athletes | Split | Team | Time | Ref |
|---|---|---|---|---|---|---|
| 1st | 31 December 1989 | Trina Painter Leopold | 16:11 | United States | 2:19:22 | |
| 1st | 31 December 1989 | Elaine Van Blunk | 32:05 | United States | 2:19:22 | |
| 1st | 31 December 1989 | Linda Begley McLennan | 19:42 | United States | 2:19:22 | |
| 1st | 31 December 1989 | Jody Hawkins Dunston | 18:41 | United States | 2:19:22 | |
| 1st | 31 December 1989 | Leann Warren | 30:00 | United States | 2:19:22 | |
| 1st | 31 December 1989 | Annette Peters Hand | 22:43 | United States | 2:19:22 | |
| 2nd | 31 December 1990 | Fatuma Roba | 22:28 | Ethiopia | 2:22:40 | |
| 2nd | 31 December 1990 | Derartu Tulu | 33:14 | Ethiopia | 2:22:40 | |
| 2nd | 31 December 1990 | Tigist Moreda | 35:09 | Ethiopia | 2:22:40 | |
| 2nd | 31 December 1990 | Gennet Gebregeorgis | 15:17 | Ethiopia | 2:22:40 | |
| 2nd | 31 December 1990 | Ejigayehu Worku | 18:49 | Ethiopia | 2:22:40 | |
| 2nd | 31 December 1990 | Luchia Yishak | 17:43 | Ethiopia | 2:22:40 | |
| 3rd | 31 December 1991 | Elena Romanova | 17:57 | Soviet Union | 2:13:59 | |
| 3rd | 31 December 1991 | Natalya Artyemova | 13:12 | Soviet Union | 2:13:59 | |
| 3rd | 31 December 1991 | Natalya Sorokivaskaya | 22:49 | Soviet Union | 2:13:59 | |
| 3rd | 31 December 1991 | Nadezhda Wijenberg Ilyina | 32:23 | Soviet Union | 2:13:59 | |
| 3rd | 31 December 1991 | Tatyana Pozdniakova | 28:55 | Soviet Union | 2:13:59 | |
| 3rd | 31 December 1991 | Olga Bondarenko Krentser | 18:43 | Soviet Union | 2:13:59 | |

== Stage bests ==
Best stage times per year
| Year | Stage 1 | | | Stage 2 | | | Stage 3 | | | Stage 4 | | | Stage 5 | | | Stage 6 | | |
| Year | Distance | Best time | Athlete | Distance | Best time | Athlete | Distance | Best time | Athlete | Distance | Best time | Athlete | Distance | Best time | Athlete | Distance | Best time | Athlete |
|---|---|---|---|---|---|---|---|---|---|---|---|---|---|---|---|---|---|---|
| 1989 | 5.2 km | 16:02 | Iva Jurkova (CZE) | 9.7 km | 30:41 | Akemi Matsuno (JPN) | 5.8 km | 19:01 | Lucille Smith (CAN) | 5.4 km | 18:26 | Lesley Morton (NZL) | 9.4 km | 30:00 | Leann Warren (USA) | 6.695 km | 22:29 | Odile Ohier (FRA) |
| 1990 | 6.5 km | 21:58 | Fernanda Ribeiro (POR) | 10 km | 32:57 | Maria-Conceiçao Ferreira (POR) | 10.2 km | 34:00 | Viorica Ghican (ROM) | 4.5 km | 14:50 | Elena Fitadov (ROM) | 5.3 km | 18:40 | Lucille Smith (CAN) | 5.695 km | 17:43 | Luchia Yishak (ETH) |
| 1991 | 5.7 km | 21:58 | Hayley Haining (SCO) | 4.3 km | 13:12 | Natalya Artyemova (RUS) | 7.2 km | 22:30 | Midori Shimizu (JPN) | 10.4 km | 32:15 | Dorthe Rasmussen (DEN) | 8.5 km | 28:02 | Miki Igarashi (JPN) | 6.095 km | 18:43 | Olga Bondarenko (RUS) |
