= Athletics at the 1987 Summer Universiade – Women's 3000 metres =

The women's 3000 metres event at the 1987 Summer Universiade was held at the Stadion Maksimir in Zagreb on 15 and 17 July 1987.

== Medalists ==
Gold	Silver	Bronze
Paula Ivan; Romania	Annie Schweitzer; United States	Natalya Artyomova; Soviet Union

== Results ==
=== Heats ===
Rank	Heat	Athlete	Nationality	Time	Notes
1	1	Paula Ivan	Romania	9:16.61	Q
2	1	Asunción Sinobas	Spain	9:16.67	Q
3	1	Natalya Artyomova	Soviet Union	9:16.83	Q
4	2	Mariana Stanescu	Romania	9:16.90	Q
5	1	Sabine Kunkel	West Germany	9:16.92	Q
6	1	Annie Schweitzer	United States	9:17.06	Q
7	2	Antje-Petra Winkelmann	West Germany	9:17.27	Q
8	2	Véronique Collard	Belgium	9:17.33	Q
9	1	Zita Ágoston	Hungary	9:17.49	q
10	2	Annette Hand	United States	9:17.57	Q
11	2	Melissa Watson	Great Britain	9:17.93	Q
12	2	Silva Rožič	Yugoslavia	9:19.74	q
13	1	Zahra Ouaziz	Morocco	9:23.37	q
14	1	Sonja Vinall	Great Britain	9:23.79	q
15	1	María Luisa Servín	Mexico	9:25.60	q
16	2	Rocío Ríos	Spain	9:31.69	
17	2	Yolanda Quimbita	Ecuador	9:45.80	
18	2	Carmen Vega	Puerto Rico	10:51.87	

=== Final ===
Rank	Athlete	Nationality	Time	Notes
1st place, gold medalist(s)	Paula Ivan	Romania	8:53.61	
2nd place, silver medalist(s)	Annie Schweitzer	United States	8:59.56	
3rd place, bronze medalist(s)	Natalya Artyomova	Soviet Union	9:02.98	
4	Annette Hand	United States	9:06.73	
5	Zita Ágoston	Hungary	9:09.16	
6	Sabine Kunkel	West Germany	9:09.56	
7	Melissa Watson	Great Britain	9:10.12	
8	Mariana Stanescu	Romania	9:13.07	
9	Véronique Collard	Belgium	9:17.43	
10	Asunción Sinobas	Spain	9:19.09	
11	Antje-Petra Winkelmann	West Germany	9:19.15	
12	Zahra Ouaziz	Morocco	9:22.23	
13	Sonja Vinall	Great Britain	9:22.40	
14	María Luisa Servín	Mexico	9:24.13	
15	Silva Rožič	Yugoslavia	9:41.62	
