= Victor Firea =

Romanian middle-distance runner

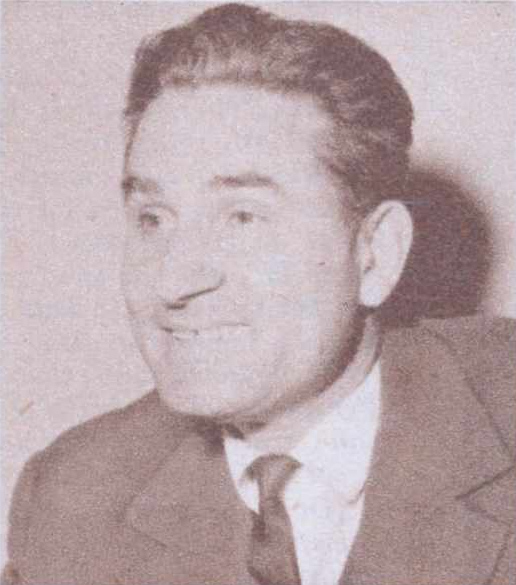
- Firea in 1965

Personal information
- Nationality: Romanian
- Born: 16 March 1923
- Died: 25 May 2007 (aged 84)

Sport
- Sport: Middle-distance running
- Event: Steeplechase

Victor Firea (16 March 1923 – 25 May 2007) was a Romanian middle-distance runner. He competed in the men's 3000 metres steeplechase at the 1952 Summer Olympics.
