= Lyudmila Derevyankina =

Kyrgyzstani middle-distance runner

Lyudmila Derevyankina (born 15 June 1966) is a retired middle distance runner who represented the USSR and later Kyrgyzstan.

She set her career best times while representing Soviet Union. In the summer of 1988 she ran the 800 metres in 1:58.85 minutes, and the 1500 metres in 4:05.89 minutes. These times were considered Kyrgyz records.

For Kyrgyzstan she competed at the 1993 World Indoor Championships, although she did not finish the race.
