= Rocío Ríos =

Spanish long-distance runner

Personal information
- Born: 13 March 1969 (age 57) León, Spain

Sport
- Sport: Marathon running

María Rocío Ríos Pérez (born 13 March 1969) is a retired female long-distance runner from Spain, who represented her native country at the 1996 Summer Olympics in the women's marathon race, finishing in fifth place.

A resident of Gijón, Ríos set her personal best (2:28:20) in the classic distance on 15 October 1995 in San Sebastián. She is a four-time national champion in the 10,000 metres (1992, 1993, 1996, and 1997), and a three-time national champion in the half marathon (1992, 1994, and 1995).

== Achievements ==
Year	Competition	Venue	Position	Event	Notes
Representing Spain
1987	Universiade	Zagreb, Yugoslavia	16th (h)	3000 m	9:31.69
1994	European Championships	Helsinki, Finland	—	Marathon	DNF
1995	World Championships	Gothenburg, Sweden	—	Marathon	DNF
1996	Olympic Games	Atlanta, United States	5th	Marathon	2:30:50
1997	World Championships	Athens, Greece	21st	Marathon	2:42:18
1998	European Championships	Budapest, Hungary	6th	Marathon	2:29:53
