= Dinu Cristea =

Romanian long-distance runner

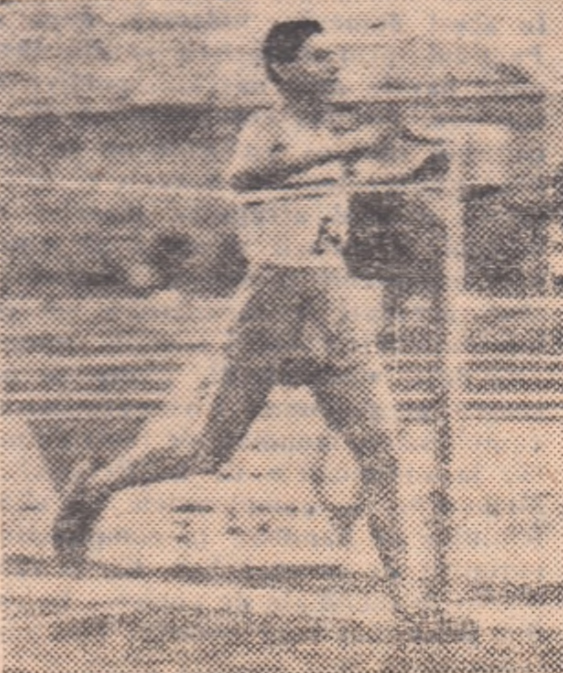
- Cristea in 1957

Personal information
- Nationality: Romanian
- Born: 10 August 1911 Vasilați, Călărași County, Romania
- Died: 1991 (aged 79–80)
- Height: 1.66 m (5 ft 5 in)
- Weight: 60 kg (130 lb)

Sport
- Sport: Long-distance running
- Events: Marathon, 10,000 metres, 5,000 metres, 1500 metres

Dinu Cristea (10 August 1911 – 1991) was a Romanian long-distance runner. He competed in the marathon at the 1952 Summer Olympics, finishing in 31st place.

He ran for the first time in an official competition in 1933. With a height of 1.66 m (5 ft 5 in) and a weight of 60 kg (130 lb), his physique was well-suited for running.

During his running career, Cristea earned 46 national titles (the highest number in Romanian athletics) and established 19 national records. His favorite events were the 5000 metres and the 10,000 metres, although he would also occasionally compete in the 1500 metres and the marathon. He retired at age 51.
