= Băile Felix =

Village in Romania

Coordinates: 46.992°N 21.980°E

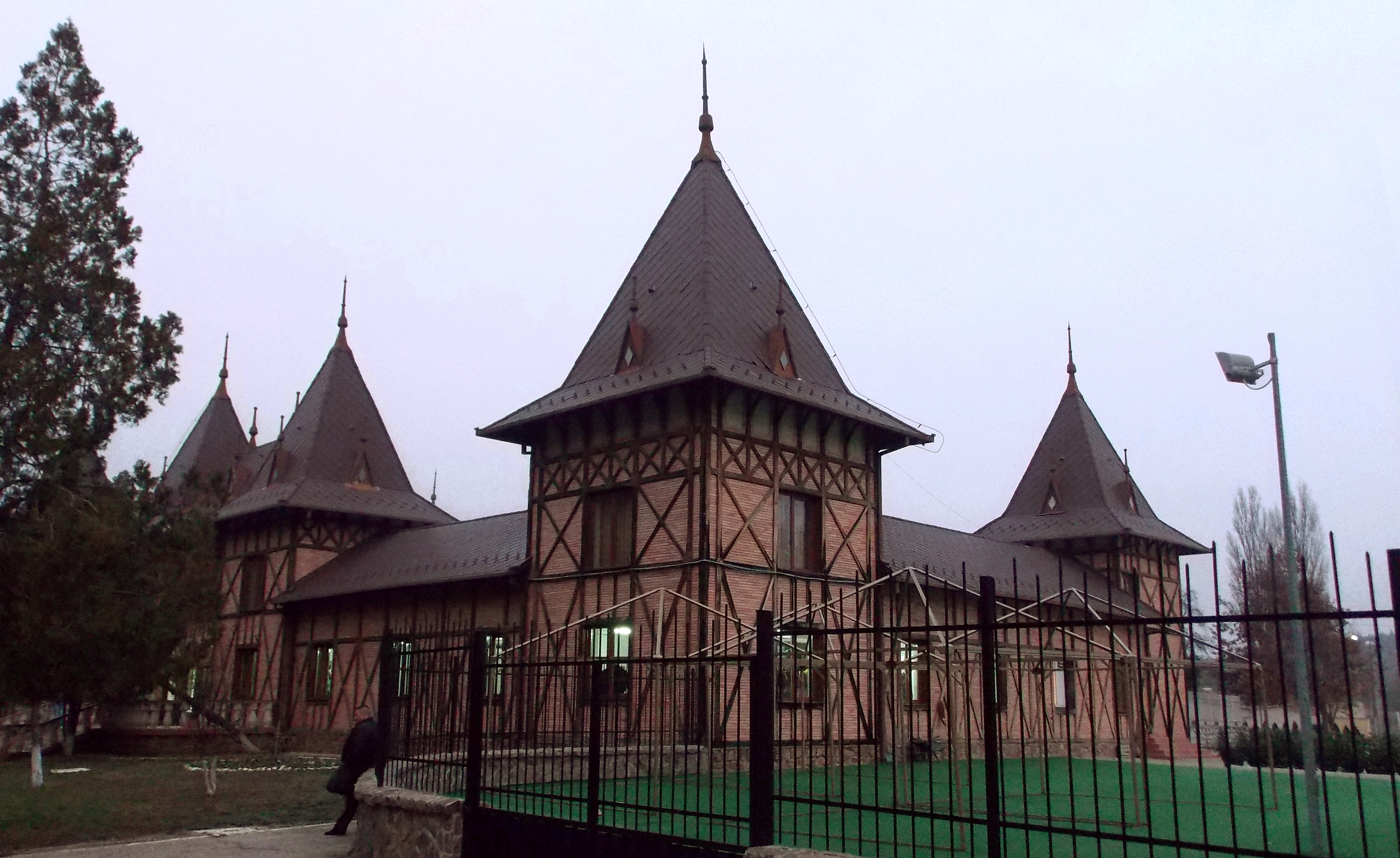
"Apollo" baths

Băile Felix (Hungarian: Félixfürdő) is a thermal spa resort near the commune of Sânmartin in Bihor County, Transylvania, Romania. Băile Felix is at a close distance to Oradea, a major city in western Romania.

== History ==
Thermal springs were valued in the eighteenth century by the monk Félix Helcher of the Monastery of Klosterbruck (de) in Moravia, administrator of the Váradszentmárton (today: Sânmartin, Romania) monastery. Between 1711 and 1721 the first treatment facilities were organized under the name of Félixfürdő (in Romanian: Baia lui Felix). Félix Helcher died in 1737. In 1885 a new spring, with a temperature of 49 °C, was found.

The thermal springs were discovered around 1000, or around 1200, or according to other experts, only in 1700. The only fact agreed by all experts is the appearance of the first buildings in this resort: between the years 1711 and 1721.

In 1920, the commune became part of Romania, in 1940, it was given back to Hungary. After World War II, it became part of Romania again.

In 1948 Sanmartin monastery area was nationalized by the communist authorities. Several recreational bases, including the one belonged to Securitate, were built on the nationalized land. The Premonstatens Order claims it latter. On April 2, 2014, the Higher Court of Cassation and Justice (HCCJ) ordered the transfer of the filed case from Oradea Court to the Giurgiu District Court, where it is now. Other requests of the Premonstratens Order on retrocession the Băile Felix lands are in progress at HCCJ. Băile Felix has since been modernized during the pandemic and is one of Romania's best known Thermal Baths.

== Geography ==
Băile Felix and 1 Mai are two thermal spa resorts located in a hilly area with birch and oak tree woods, 8 km south of the municipality of Oradea (seat of Bihor County) and 22 km south-east of Borş (border checkpoint to Hungary). The resort lost its passenger railway service in 2014.

== Climate ==
Summers are not excessively hot and winters are mild, with moderate precipitation (650 mm annually).

== Fauna and flora ==
In the thermal waters of the Peţa river and lake, having a constant temperature of 30-31 °C, live the snail Melanopsis parreyssi (tertiary relict) and the fish Scardinus racovitzai as well as a rare species of subtropical water lily - Nymphaea lotus thermalis - tertiary relict, a natural monument.

== Spa ==
The resorts host many mineral springs with thermal (20-48 °C), sulphuric, calcic, sodic, rich in bicarbonate waters known since the beginning of the millennium. The soothing effect of the waters on articular and muscular pain and on various rheumatic neuralgias accounts for the fame of cures in the resort for the treatment of inflammatory rheumatic diseases (rheumatic polyarthritis, rheumatoid spondylitis, conditions after acute articular rheumatism), degenerative and articular rheumatic diseases, central and peripheral neurological disorders, gynecological diseases, post-traumatic conditions, endocrine disorders.

The facilities of the two resorts offer treatment of rheumatism and neurological and gynecological diseases. The modern medical base has at its disposal various facilities for procedures involving electrotherapy, hydrotherapy, aerosols, massage, paraffin packing and other water treatments.

== Gallery ==
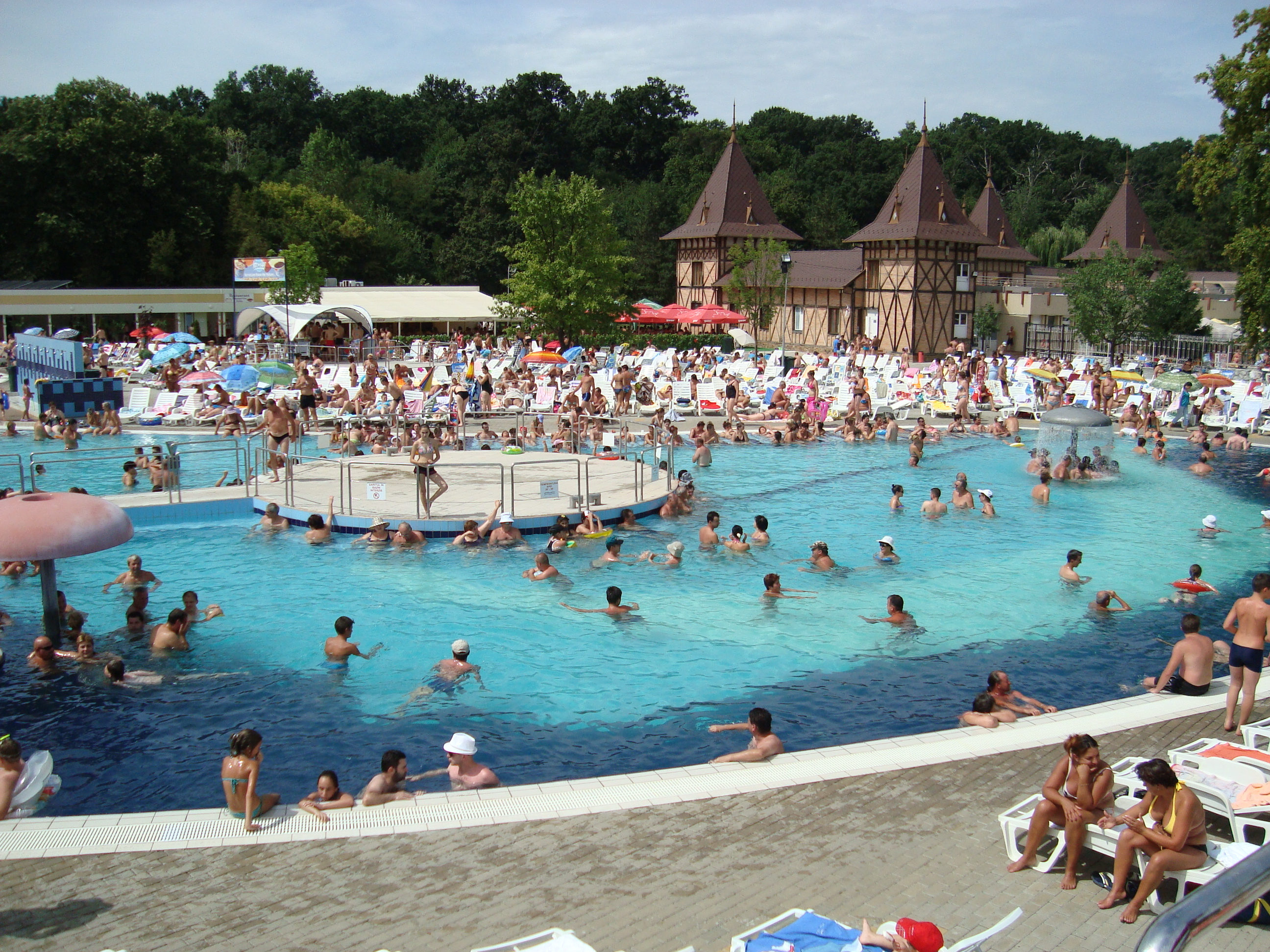

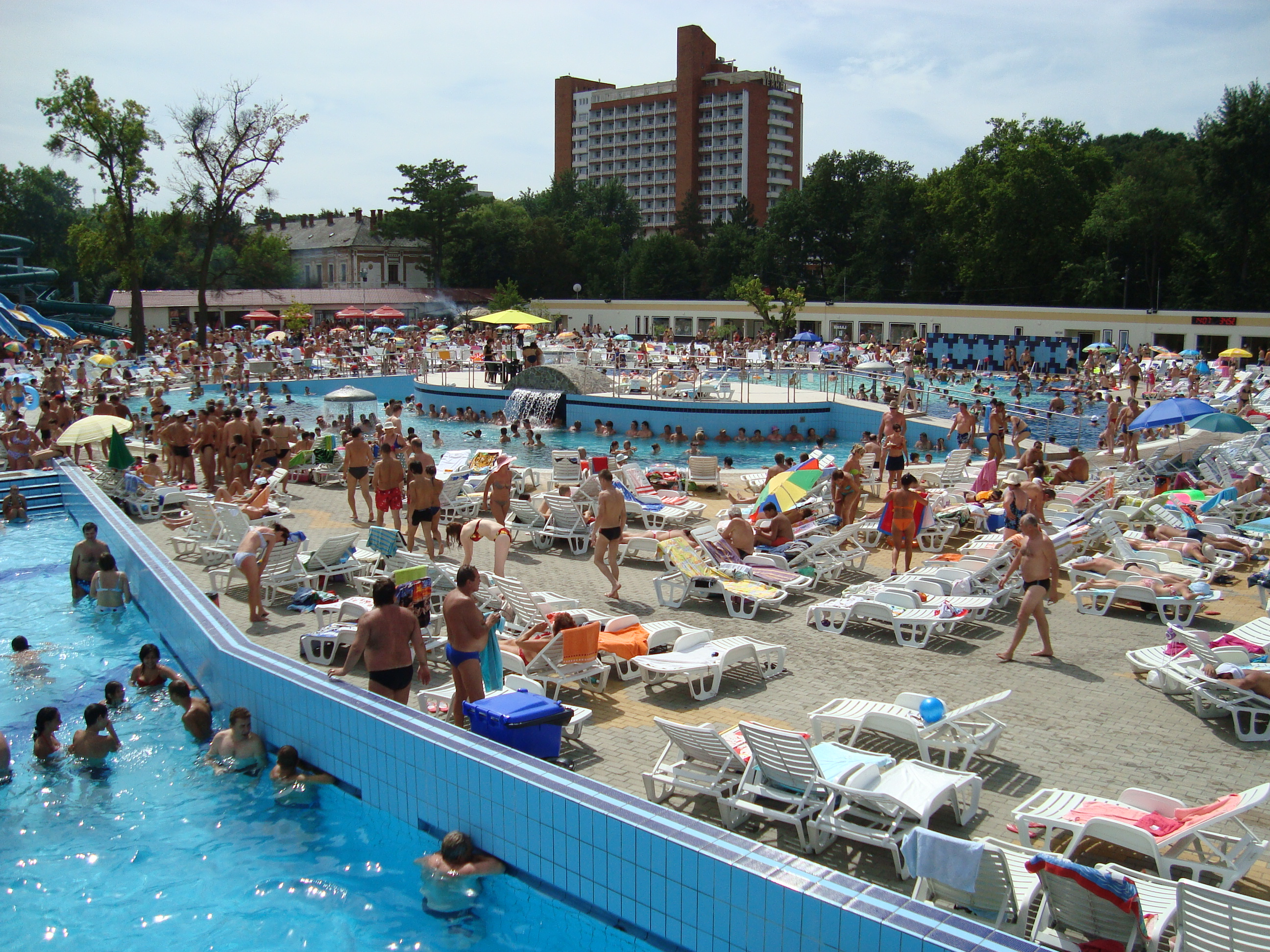

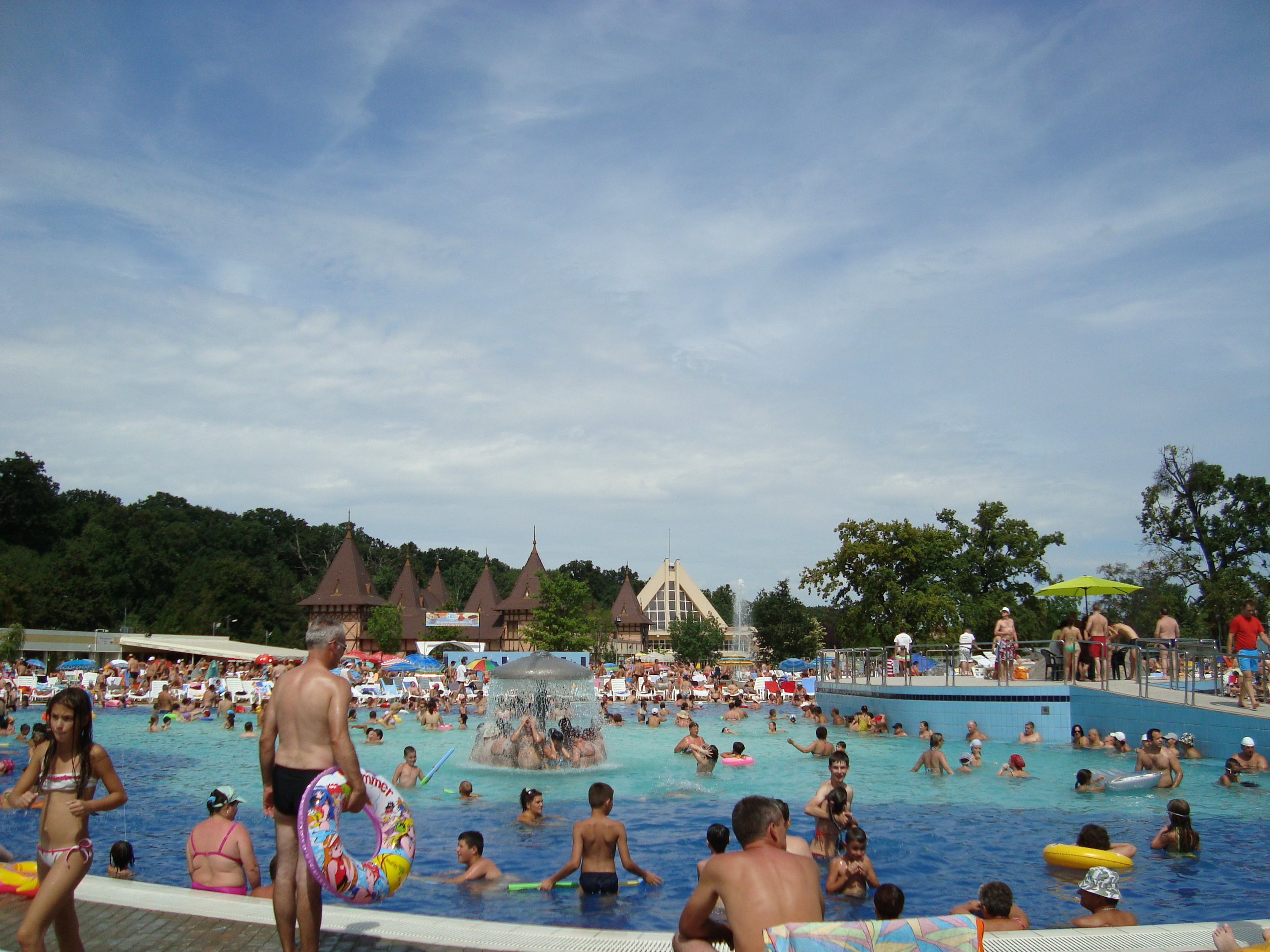

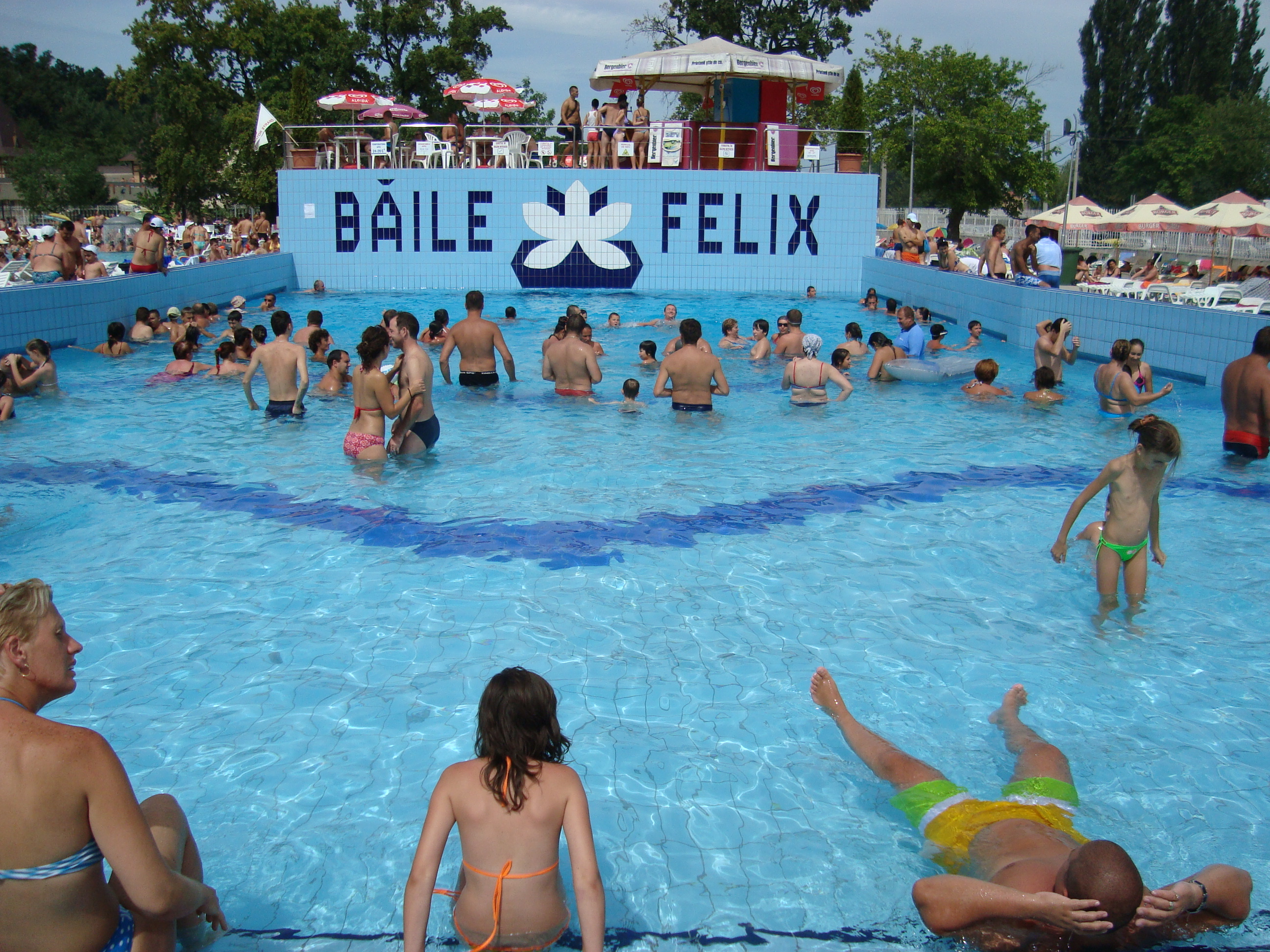

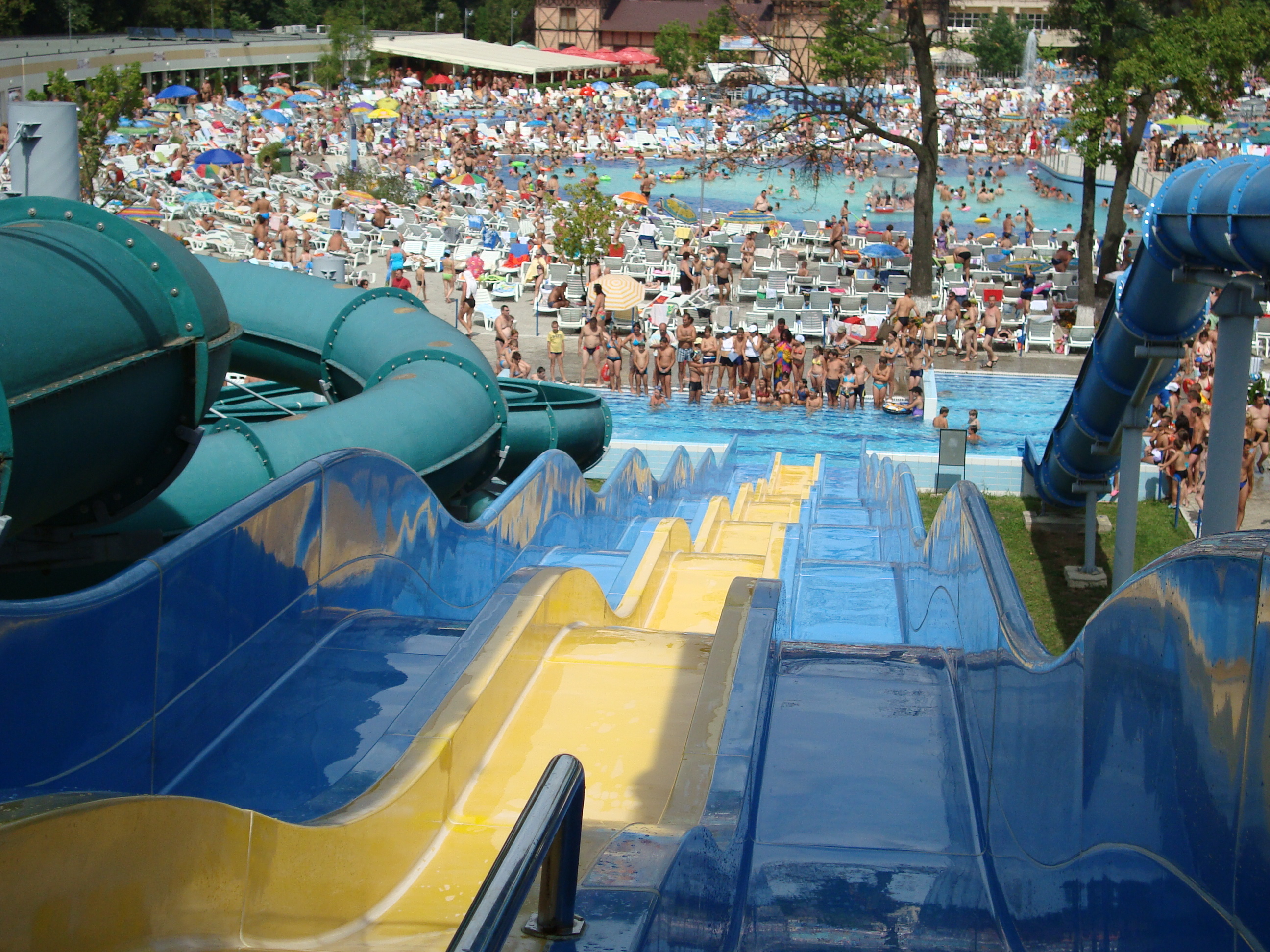

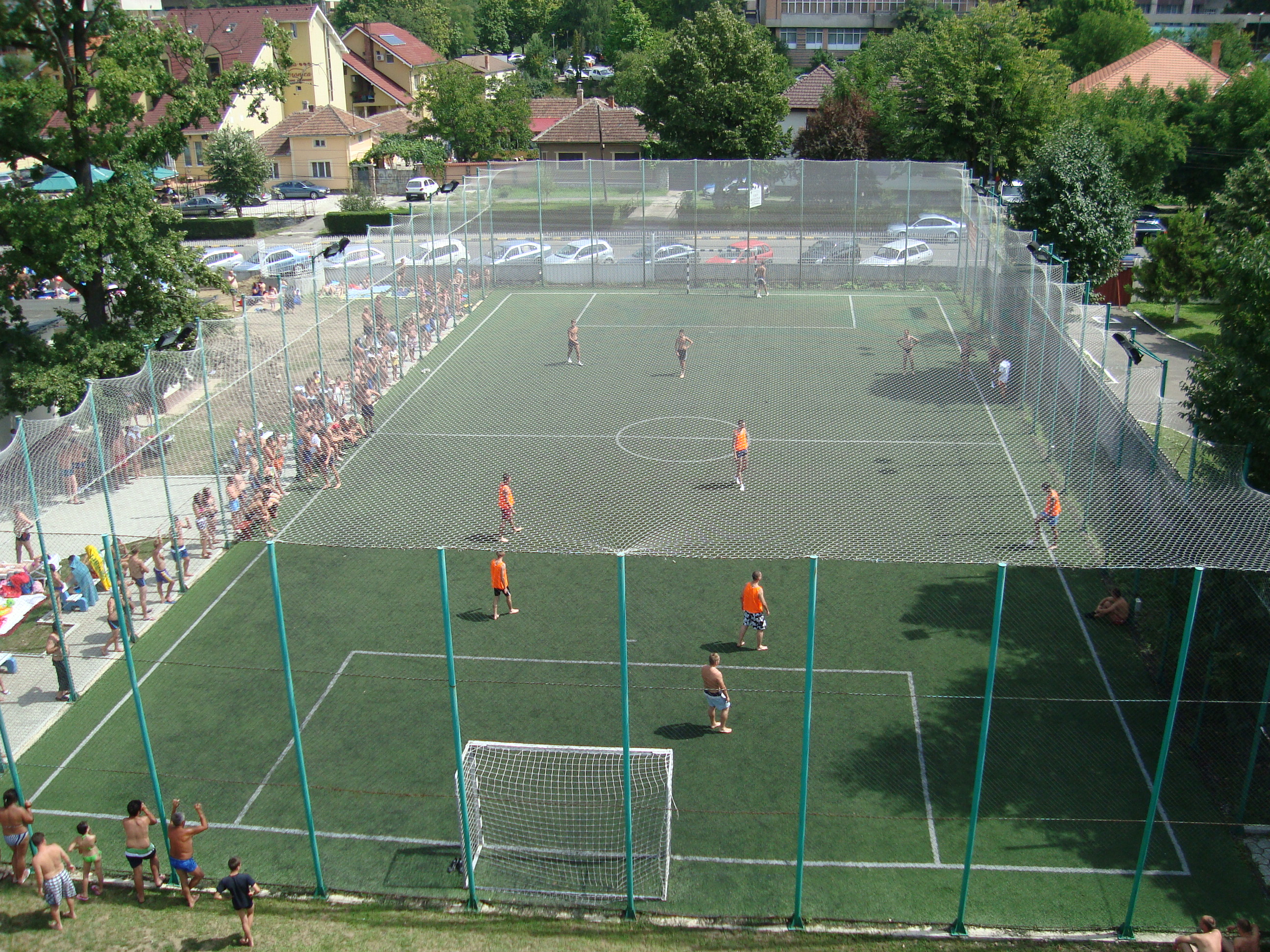

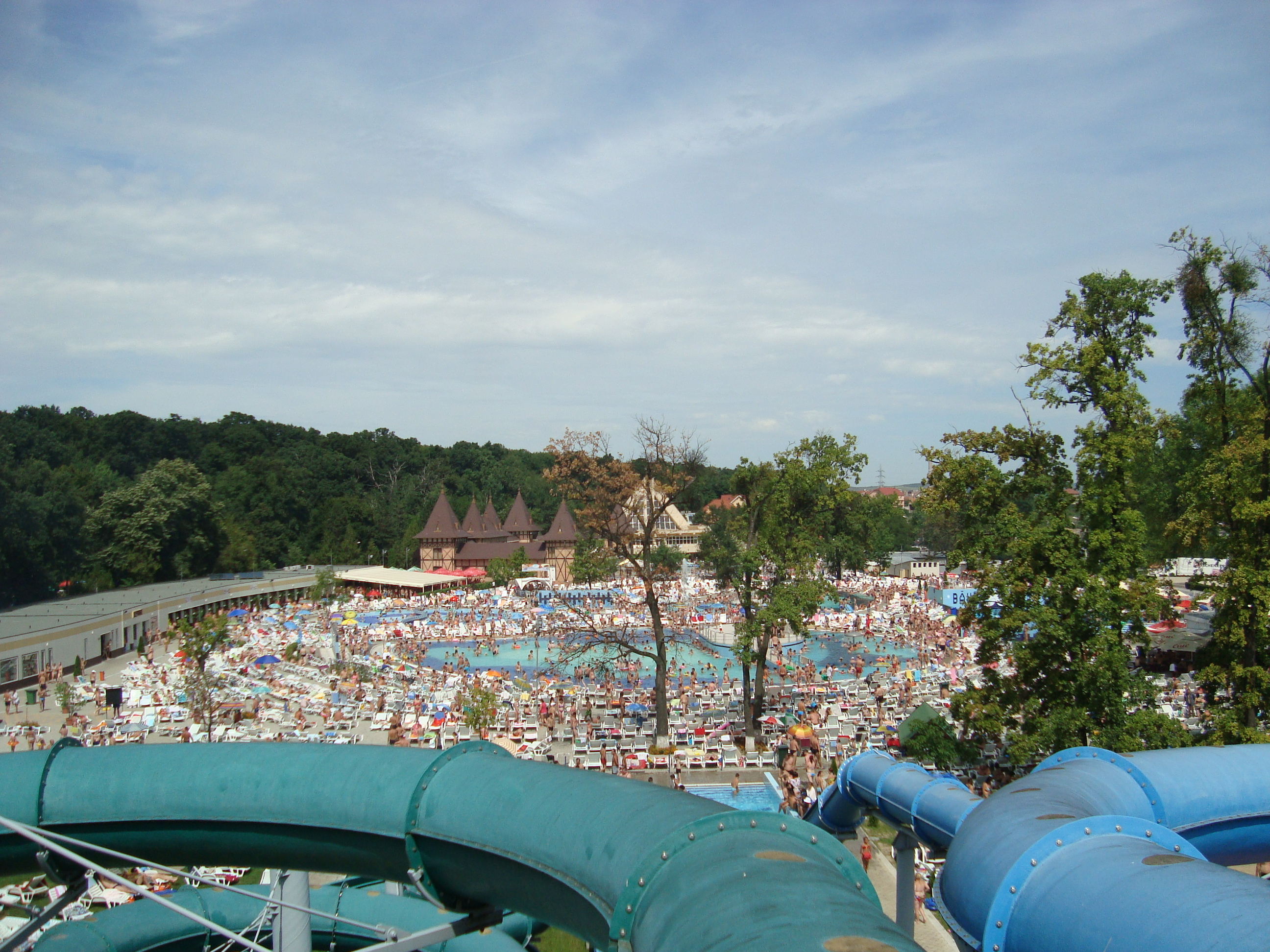

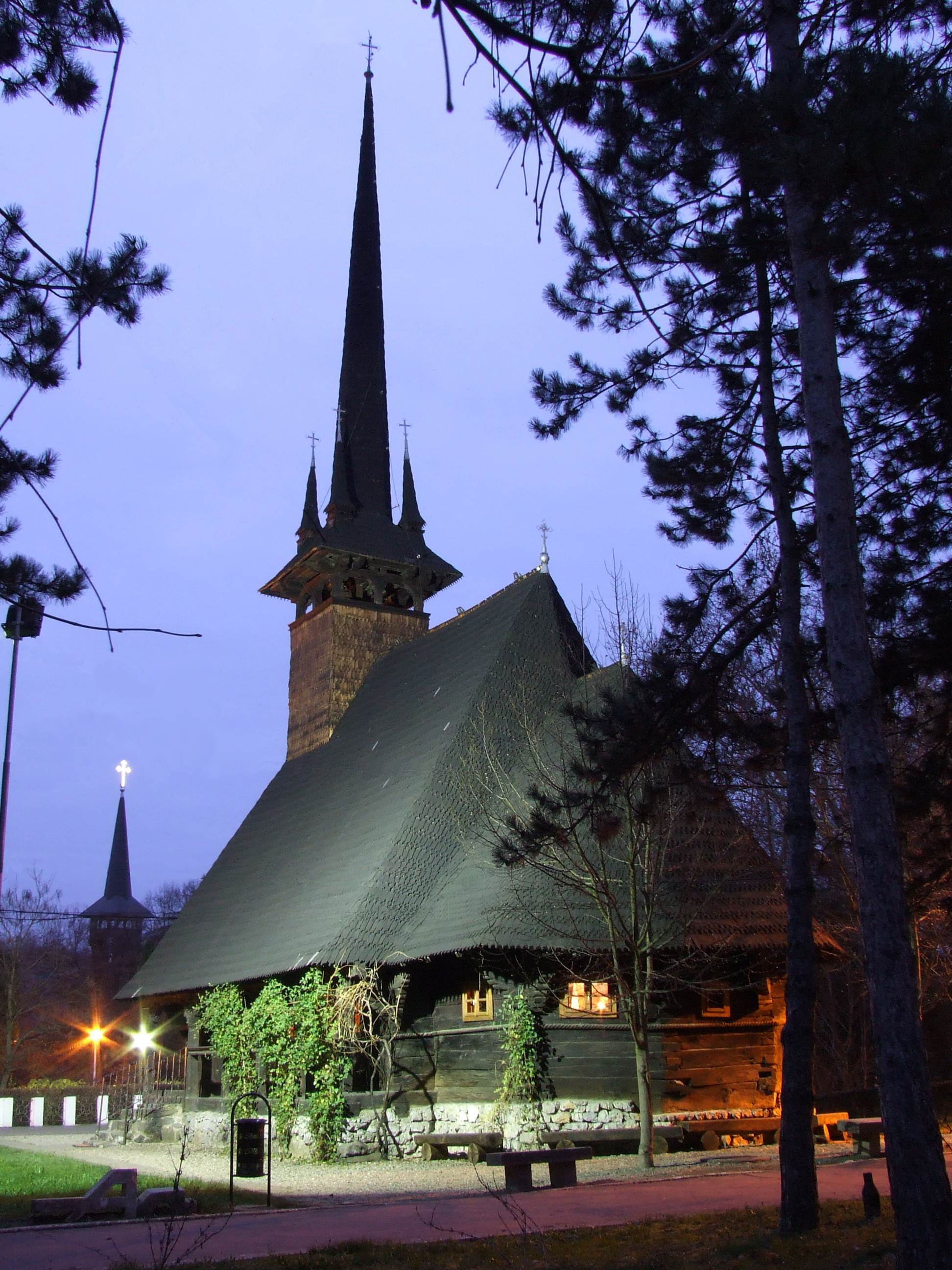

== Attractions ==
The Felix and 1 Mai spa are also ideal for relaxation and visitors can take advantage of the following:

- the pool with artificial waves in 1 Mai (the oldest in the country)
- the thermal water swimming resorts : "Apolo" (since 1900) in Felix and "Venus" in 1 Mai

Those who have an interest in church history and architecture might also romantic elements

- the Sanifarm baroque building, formerly "Saint Vincent" monastery (18th century)
- the churches in Rontău (15th century) and Haieu (1906)
- the wooden churches in Băile Felix
