= Paola Testa =

Italian long-distance runner

Personal information
- National team: Italy (2 caps 1987-1989)
- Born: 27 May 1969 (age 57) Lecco, Italy

Sport
- Country: Italy
- Sport: Athletics
- Events: Long-distance running; Cross country running

Achievements and titles
- Personal bests: 3000 m: 9:43.35 (1998); 5000 m: 17:55.88 (2008); 10,000 m: 35:44.9 (2002); Half marathon: 1:18:45 (2010)

Paola Testa (born 27 May 1969) is a former Italian female long-distance runner and cross-country runner who competed at individual senior level at the World Athletics Cross Country Championships (1996).
