= Beijing International Women's Ekiden =

The Beijing International Women's Ekiden was an annual, international ekiden (marathon relay) road running competition held in Beijing, China. Formed in 1991 as the Great Wall International Ekiden Relay, the competition featured a six-stage relay race for women from 1991 to 2005, and included a men's race once, at its final edition. The race format had first, third and fifth legs at five kilometres in distance, second and fourth legs over ten kilometres, and a sixth and final leg covering the remaining 7.195 km of the classic marathon distance.

The host nation China was the most successful team, winning nine of the fifteen runnings of the women's race. The women's course record of 2:11:41 was set by the Chinese team in 1998. Kenya was the sole men's winner, in 2:04:17 hours in 2005.

== Editions ==
Edition in gold was held as the Great Wall International Ekiden Relay

Edition	Year	Location	Date	Men's teams	Women's teams	Athletes
1st	1991	Beijing, China	17 March	0		
2nd	1992	Beijing, China	15 March	0		
3rd	1993	Beijing, China	14 March	0		
4th	1994	Beijing, China	20 February	0		
5th	1995	Beijing, China	4 March	0		
6th	1996	Beijing, China	2 March	0		
7th	1997	Beijing, China		0		
8th	1998	Beijing, China	28 February	0		
9th	1999	Beijing, China	6 March	0		
10th	2000	Beijing, China	20 February	0		
11th	2001	Beijing, China	18 February	0		
12th	2002	Beijing, China	17 February	0		
13th	2003	Beijing, China		0		
14th	2004	Beijing, China	11 April	0		
15th	2005	Beijing, China	10 April			

== Medallists ==
=== Men ===
Year	Gold		Silver		Bronze	
2005	Kenya; Elisha Birgen; David Keter; Hillary Kipchumba; Onesmus Nyerere; Joseph Keino; Enock Mitei	2:04:17	Spain; Juan Carlos Higuero; Carles Castillejo; José Luis Blanco; Iván Galán; Roberto García; José Ríos	2:04:47	Russia; Oleg Kulkov; Dmitriy Maksimov; Oleg Marusin; Mikhail Khobotov; Pavel Shapovalov; Sergey Yemelyanov	2:05:57

=== Women ===
Year	Gold		Silver		Bronze	
1991	Soviet Union	2:19:59	United States	2:20:16	China	2:20:35
1992	Unified Team	2:17:01	China	2:17:24	United States	2:21:55
1993	China	2:14:16	China "B"	2:16:31	Kenya	2:17:20
1994	China	2:16:03	Romania	2:20:00	Russia	2:21:33
1995	Japan	2:16:32	Romania	2:17:10	Russia	2:19:16
1996	China	2:15:48	Romania	?	Japan	2:18:27
1997	Ethiopia	2:15:10	China	2:17:17	Japan	2:17:23
1998	China	2:11:41	Japan	2:16:13	Russia	2:17:26
1999	China	2:17:52	Japan	2:18:07	North Korea	2:19:13
2000	China	2:15:49	Mexico	2:18:31	Ethiopia	2:18:57
2001	Japan; Makiko Kawashima; Takako Kotorida; Yamamoto; Suzuki; Yokota; Akiko Kawashima	2:16:43	Ethiopia	2:18:12	China	2:18:35
2002	China	2:14:27	Japan	2:18:05	Ethiopia	2:20:19
2003	China	2:17:46	Ethiopia	2:20:51	Mongolia	2:56:55
2004	China	2:19:52	Japan	2:22:31	United States	2:29:57
2005	Ethiopia; Sentayehu Ejigu; Eyerusalem Kuma; Mestawet Tufa; Aheza Kiros; Amane Gobena; Workitu Ayanu	2:18:08	China; Zhang Chong; Sun Yingjie; Bai Xue; Zhu Yanmei; Wang Shijuan; Xing Huina	2:19:36	Japan; Noriko Matsuoka; Yuko Machida; Ikumi Watanabe; Marina Haga; Mayumi Fujita; Kanako Hori	2:24:32
