= Yokohama International Women's Ekiden =

The Yokohama International Women's Ekiden held in Yokohama, Japan, was one of the prominent ekiden races of the year. It was held annually from 1983 to 2009, and was discontinued because of the replacement of the Tokyo Women's Marathon by the Yokohama Women's Marathon.

The traditional Ekiden relay consists of two laps of ten kilometers, three of five kilometers and one of 7.195 meters, the total adds up to a traditional marathon.

== Winners ==
Year	Country	Time
1983	Soviet Union	
1984	United Kingdom	
1985	Soviet Union	2.18.27
1986	Norway	2.16.42
1987	Portugal	2.16.49,
1988	Soviet Union	2.15,41
1989	China	2.18.33.
1990	Japan	
1991	China	2.16.23
1992	CIS	2.16.41
1993	Japan	
1994	Russia	
1995	Japan	2.17.31
1996	Japan	
1997	Japan	
1998	Japan	
1999	Japan	
2000	Kenya	2.15.14
2001	Russia	
2002	Japan	
2003	Russia	2.15.10
2004	Ethiopia	
2005	Japan	2:13:40
2006	Russia	2:13:55
2007	Russia	2:14:48
2008	Ethiopia	2:14:47
2009	Japan	2:15:05
