= Elena Fidatov =

Romanian runner

Medal record

Women's athletics

Representing Romania

European Cross Country Championships
Silver medal – second place	1997 Oeiras	Women's race
Bronze medal – third place	1994 Alnwick	Women's race

Elena Fidatov, sometimes known as Elena Fidatof, (born 24 July 1960) is a former Romanian middle- and long-distance runner who competed in track, road, and cross country running competitions. In a period spanning 1984 to 2002, she competed at IAAF World Cross Country Championships on thirteen occasions, making her one of the most frequent participants at the event. She is a two-time Olympian for Romania, having represented her country at the 1992 and 1996 Summer Olympics.

She ran on the track at the IAAF World Championships in Athletics on three occasions, competing in events from 1500 metres to 5000 metres. She was integral to a number of team medal performances for Romania at the World Cross Country event and also the IAAF World Half Marathon Championships. Individually, she won a bronze and a silver medal at the European Cross Country Championships in 1994 and 1997, respectively. Her later career was marred by doping incidents; she was reprieved of a failed test in 1996 but received a two-year ban from the sport in 1998 after testing positive for the anabolic steroid nandrolone.

== Career ==
Born in Tulcea, Romania, Elena Fidatov-Moruzov made her international debut at the 1984 IAAF World Cross Country Championships, reaching the top 40 in the women's long race. She was much improved at the 1985 World Cross Country event and her tenth-place finish helped the Romanian women, led by Fiţa Lovin, to the team bronze medal. She was third at the Balkan Cross Country Championships that year and succeeded her compatriot Mariana Chirila to the title the following season. Fidatov came ninth in the long race at the 1986 IAAF World Cross Country Championships. She did not compete internationally in the late 1980s.

Fidatov took the Balkan Cross Country title for a second time in 1990, but managed only 60th place on the world stage. That same year she was fifth over 1500 metres at the 1990 European Athletics Championships. Her focus began to turn to track running and she competed in the 1500 m finals at both the 1991 World Championships in Athletics and the 1992 Barcelona Olympics. She doubled up for the 1993 World Championships in Athletics, running in both the 1500 m and 3000 metres, although she failed to progress from the heats stage in either discipline. Her performances did earn her a place in the 3000 m at the 1993 IAAF Grand Prix Final, where she finished sixth. She also improved in the World Cross Country Championships over this period, coming 25th and 26th in the 1992 and 1993 editions, respectively.

With no major track events for prepare for in 1994, her major outing of the year was at the 1994 European Cross Country Championships, where she took the bronze medal and led Romania to the team title with Chirila and Margareta Keszeg. She also made her debut at the 1994 IAAF World Half Marathon Championships, where she was fifth and easily took the team title alongside medallists Iulia Negura and Anuța Cătună. Fidatov competed in world-level events on the road, track and grass in the 1995 season, beginning with 23rd place and a team bronze at the 1995 IAAF World Cross Country Championships, tenth in the 5000 metres final at the 1995 World Championships in Athletics, and culminating in a team gold medal for her sixth-place finish at the 1995 IAAF World Half Marathon Championships.

Her 1996 season started with controversy as she failed a doping test in South Africa for a banned diuretic. However, she escaped punishment as a panel accepted that she had used the substance to treat her kidney pain. She retained her World Cross bronze in 1996, in a Romanian team led by an emerging Gabriela Szabo. Her second Olympic appearance, representing Romania in the 5000 m at the 1996 Atlanta Olympics in August, saw her claim a career best finish in a global track final by coming seventh overall. The following month, she was selected for the marathon relay at the 1996 IAAF World Road Relay Championships and the team (including Iulia Ionescu, Chirila, Lelia Deselnecu, Negura and Luminita Gogârlea) finished as runners-up behind the Ethiopian women.

She had a highly successful cross country season in 1997, taking a series of high-profile circuit wins including the Antrim International Cross Country, Cross Zornotza, Cross de San Sebastián, Cross Internacional de Itálica, Eurocross, and Almond Blossom Cross Country. These performances helped rank her in second place on that year's IAAF World Cross Challenge, behind winner Gete Wami. The thirty-six-year-old also had one of her highest placings at the 1997 IAAF World Cross Country Championships, coming twelfth in the women's long race. She ended the year with a silver medal at the 1997 European Cross Country Championships, leading Romania to second place in the team rankings.

She failed a doping control test at the 1998 Cross Zornotza after nandrolone was detected in her system, an infraction which led to a two-year ban from the sport. She did not stop her training during this period and received clearance from the IAAF to take part in the 2000 IAAF World Cross Country Championships. She managed 46th in the short race but only 68th place in the long race that year. She competed twice more at the event, taking 13th in the short race in 2001 (leading Romania to the bronze) and finishing 41st in 2002. These performances brought her total number of career appearances at the competition to thirteen.

In 2000, at the age of 40, she ran the 5,000 metres on the track in 15:20.59 to win the Romanian National Championships. The time is the current W40 Masters World Record in the event.

== See also ==
- List of doping cases in athletics
