= 1988 IAAF World Cross Country Championships – Senior women's race =

Senior women's race at the 1988 IAAF World Cross Country Championships
- Organisers: IAAF
- Edition: 16th
- Date: March 26
- Host city: Auckland, New Zealand
- Venue: Ellerslie Racecourse
- Events: 1
- Distances: 5.962 km – Senior women
- Participation: 141 athletes from 32 nations

The Senior women's race at the 1988 IAAF World Cross Country Championships was held in Auckland, New Zealand, at the Ellerslie Racecourse on March 26, 1988. A report on the event was given in the Glasgow Herald. Complete results, medallists, and the results of British athletes were published.

== Race results ==
=== Senior women's race (5.962 km) ===
==== Individual ====
Rank	Athlete	Country	Time
1st place, gold medalist(s)	Ingrid Kristiansen	Norway	19:04
2nd place, silver medalist(s)	Angela Tooby	United Kingdom	19:23
3rd place, bronze medalist(s)	Annette Sergent	France	19:29
4	Lynn Jennings	United States	19:38
5	Albertina Machado	Portugal	19:38
6	Yelena Romanova	Soviet Union	19:41
7	Regina Chistyakova	Soviet Union	19:41
8	Liève Slegers	Belgium	19:44
9	Jill Hunter	United Kingdom	19:46
10	Maria Curatolo	Italy	19:46
11	Marie-Pierre Duros	France	19:49
12	Susan Sirma	Kenya	19:50
13	Wang Huabi	China	19:50
14	Wang Xiuting	China	19:51
15	Malin Wästlund	Sweden	19:55
16	Susan Tooby	United Kingdom	19:56
17	Yuki Tamura	Japan	19:57
18	Marina Rodchenkova	Soviet Union	19:57
19	Nancy Tinari	Canada	19:57
20	Olga Bondarenko	Soviet Union	19:58
21	Brenda Shackleton	Canada	19:58
22	Jane Ngotho	Kenya	19:58
23	Conceição Ferreira	Portugal	19:59
24	Leslie Seymour	United States	20:01
25	Ulla Marquette	Canada	20:02
26	Lizanne Bussières	Canada	20:04
27	Christine McMiken	New Zealand	20:05
28	Patricia Demilly	France	20:06
29	Nan Davis	United States	20:07
30	Rosario Murcia	France	20:09
31	Sabrina Dornhoefer	United States	20:09
32	Jackie Perkins	Australia	20:09
33	Jackie Goodman	New Zealand	20:10
34	Fiona Truman	United Kingdom	20:10
35	Maria Lelut	France	20:11
36	Annie Schweitzer	United States	20:12
37	Mónica Gama	Portugal	20:15
38	Kerstin Pressler	West Germany	20:16
39	Natalya Lagunkova	Soviet Union	20:17
40	Akemi Matsuno	Japan	20:17
41	Purity Samuel	Kenya	20:18
42	Judy Chamberlin	United States	20:19
43	Kersti Jakobsen	Denmark	20:21
44	Zhong Huandi	China	20:23
45	Barbara Moore	New Zealand	20:24
46	Martine Oppliger	Switzerland	20:24
47	Esther Saina	Kenya	20:25
48	Sonia Vinall	United Kingdom	20:25
49	Sinikka Keskitalo	Finland	20:25
50	Ingrid Delagrange	Belgium	20:26
51	Isabella Moretti	Switzerland	20:26
52	Antje Winkelmann	West Germany	20:26
53	Anne Keenan	Ireland	20:30
54	Ana Isabel Alonso	Spain	20:30
55	Małgorzata Birbach	Poland	20:31
56	Lesley Graham	New Zealand	20:32
57	Delilah Asiago	Kenya	20:33
58	Maree McDonagh	Australia	20:34
59	Lyudmila Matveyeva	Soviet Union	20:35
60	Rosanna Munerotto	Italy	20:36
61	Ana Oliveira	Portugal	20:37
62	Estela Estévez	Spain	20:38
63	Christine Sørum	Norway	20:40
64	Kazue Kojima	Japan	20:41
65	Anette Dwyer	Australia	20:42
66	Angelines Rodriguez	Spain	20:42
67	Masako Matsumoto	Japan	20:42
68	Dolores Rizo	Spain	20:44
69	Rose Lambe	Ireland	20:44
70	Tina Krebs	Denmark	20:44
71	Grete Kirkeberg	Norway	20:45
72	Mary O'Connor	New Zealand	20:46
73	Maria Guida	Italy	20:47
74	Sirkku Kumpulainen	Finland	20:50
75	Christine Loiseau	France	20:52
76	Bente Moe	Norway	20:53
77	Päivi Tikkanen	Finland	20:54
78	Fulvia Furlan	Italy	20:55
79	Cristina Agusti	Spain	20:55
80	Sheila Purves	Hong Kong	20:55
81	Li Xiuxia	China	20:55
82	Christine Pfitzinger	New Zealand	21:00
83	Eva Svensson	Sweden	21:01
84	Laura Wight	United Kingdom	21:02
85	Mary Donohoe	Ireland	21:07
86	Catherine Rooney	Ireland	21:07
87	Roberta Brunet	Italy	21:08
88	Satu Levelä	Finland	21:08
89	Silvana Pereira	Brazil	21:10
90	Genoveva Eichenmann	Switzerland	21:10
91	Leah Pells	Canada	21:12
92	Yuko Gordon	Hong Kong	21:15
93	Sue Malaxos	Australia	21:17
94	Gabriela Wolf	West Germany	21:17
95	Rita de Jesús	Brazil	21:17
96	Margaret Ngotho	Kenya	21:18
97	Anita Håkenstad	Norway	21:18
98	Anna Müller	Austria	21:23
99	Janet Mayal	Brazil	21:27
100	Grazyna Kowina	Poland	21:28
101	Tanja Merchiers	Belgium	21:29
102	Naomi Yoshida	Japan	21:32
103	Chie Katsura	Japan	21:32
104	Kerryn Hindmarsh	Australia	21:33
105	Maria van Gestel	Belgium	21:36
106	Daria Nauer	Switzerland	21:36
107	Roseanne Brisbane	Australia	21:40
108	Marinete Quintanilha	Brazil	21:42
109	Sabine Knetsch	West Germany	21:44
110	Maryse Justin	Mauritius	21:47
111	Sissel Grottenberg	Norway	21:49
112	Roisin Smyth	Ireland	21:57
113	Rita Malone	Ireland	21:58
114	Tove Lorentzen	Denmark	22:00
115	Stella Selles	Argentina	22:02
116	Griselda González	Argentina	22:02
117	Agnese Possamai	Italy	22:09
118	Martha Lungu	Zambia	22:23
119	Marvis Chiloshya	Zambia	22:33
120	Nanda Shaner Yadav	India	22:34
121	Suman Rawat	India	22:39
122	Vijay Nilman Khalko	India	22:42
123	Rizoneide Vanderley	Brazil	22:47
124	Maria Ritter	Liechtenstein	22:59
125	Elisa Cobañea	Argentina	23:00
126	Esther Nambela	Zambia	23:13
127	Adriano Calvo	Argentina	23:16
128	Surjit Kaur	India	23:43
129	Raj Kumari Pandey	Nepal	23:45
130	Mercy Kaluinga	Zambia	24:40
131	Alison Robinson	Hong Kong	24:40
132	Donna Cauvuilati	Fiji	24:44
133	Chiu Pik Kwan	Hong Kong	24:58
134	Bimala Joshi	Nepal	25:41
135	Menuka Ravat	Nepal	25:49
136	Onorina Rokowati	Fiji	25:53
137	Nir Maya Karki	Nepal	26:46
138	Amelia Likusaileka	Fiji	27:08
139	Reena Devi	Fiji	28:59
—	Albertina Dias	Portugal	DNF
—	Montserrat Abello	Spain	DNF

==== Teams ====
Rank	Team	Points
1st place, gold medalist(s)	Soviet Union: Yelena Romanova / 6; Regina Chistyakova / 7; Marina Rodchenkova / 18; Olga Bondarenko / 20; (Natalya Lagunkova) / (39); (Lyudmila Matveyeva) / (59)	51
2nd place, silver medalist(s)	United Kingdom: Angela Tooby / 2; Jill Hunter / 9; Susan Tooby / 16; Fiona Truman / 34; (Sonia Vinall) / (48); (Laura Wight) / (84)	61
3rd place, bronze medalist(s)	France: Annette Sergent / 3; Marie-Pierre Duros / 11; Patricia Demilly / 28; Rosario Murcia / 30; (Maria Lelut) / (35); (Christine Loiseau) / (75)	72
4	United States: Lynn Jennings / 4; Leslie Seymour / 24; Nan Davis / 29; Sabrina Dornhoefer / 31; (Annie Schweitzer) / (36); (Judy Chamberlin) / (42)	88
5	Canada: Nancy Tinari / 19; Brenda Shackleton / 21; Ulla Marquette / 25; Lizanne Bussières / 26; (Leah Pells) / (91)	91
6	Kenya: Susan Sirma / 12; Jane Ngotho / 22; Purity Samuel / 41; Esther Saina / 47; (Delilah Asiago) / (57); (Margaret Ngotho) / (96)	122
7	Portugal: Albertina Machado / 5; Conceição Ferreira / 23; Mónica Gama / 37; Ana Oliveira / 61; (Albertina Dias) / (DNF)	126
8	China: Wang Huabi / 13; Wang Xiuting / 14; Zhong Huandi / 44; Li Xiuxia / 81	152
9	New Zealand: Christine McMiken / 27; Jackie Goodman / 33; Barbara Moore / 45; Lesley Graham / 56; (Mary O'Connor) / (72); (Christine Pfitzinger) / (82)	161
10	Japan: Yuki Tamura / 17; Akemi Matsuno / 40; Kazue Kojima / 64; Masako Matsumoto / 67; (Naomi Yoshida) / (102); (Chie Katsura) / (103)	188
11	Norway: Ingrid Kristiansen / 1; Christine Sørum / 63; Grete Kirkeberg / 71; Bente Moe / 76; (Anita Håkenstad) / (97); (Sissel Grottenberg) / (111)	211
12	Italy: Maria Curatolo / 10; Rosanna Munerotto / 60; Maria Guida / 73; Fulvia Furlan / 78; (Roberta Brunet) / (87); (Agnese Possamai) / (117)	221
13	Australia: Jackie Perkins / 32; Maree McDonagh / 58; Anette Dwyer / 65; Sue Malaxos / 93; (Kerryn Hindmarsh) / (104); (Roseanne Brisbane) / (107)	248
14	Spain: Ana Isabel Alonso / 54; Estela Estévez / 62; Angelines Rodriguez / 66; Dolores Rizo / 68; (Cristina Agusti) / (79); (Montserrat Abello) / (DNF)	250
15	Belgium: Liève Slegers / 8; Ingrid Delagrange / 50; Tanja Merchiers / 101; Maria van Gestel / 105	264
16	Finland: Sinikka Keskitalo / 49; Sirkku Kumpulainen / 74; Päivi Tikkanen / 77; Satu Levelä / 88	288
17	Ireland: Anne Keenan / 53; Rose Lambe / 69; Mary Donohoe / 85; Catherine Rooney / 86; (Roisin Smyth) / (112); (Rita Malone) / (113)	293
18	Switzerland: Martine Oppliger / 46; Isabella Moretti / 51; Genoveva Eichenmann / 90; Daria Nauer / 106	293
19	West Germany: Kerstin Pressler / 38; Antje Winkelmann / 52; Gabriela Wolf / 94; Sabine Knetsch / 109	293
20	Brazil: Silvana Pereira / 89; Rita de Jesús / 95; Janet Mayal / 99; Marinete Quintanilha / 108; (Rizoneide Vanderley) / (123)	391
21	Hong Kong: Sheila Purves / 80; Yuko Gordon / 92; Alison Robinson / 131; Chiu Pik Kwan / 133	436
22	Argentina: Stella Selles / 115; Griselda González / 116; Elisa Cobañea / 125; Adriano Calvo / 127	483
23	India: Nanda Shaner Yadav / 120; Suman Rawat / 121; Vijay Nilman Khalko / 122; Surjit Kaur / 128	491
24	Zambia: Martha Lungu / 118; Marvis Chiloshya / 119; Esther Nambela / 126; Mercy Kaluinga / 130	493
25	Nepal: Raj Kumari Pandey / 129; Bimala Joshi / 134; Menuka Ravat / 135; Nir Maya Karki / 137	535
26	Fiji: Donna Cauvuilati / 132; Onorina Rokowati / 136; Amelia Likusaileka / 138; Reena Devi / 139	545

- Note: Athletes in parentheses did not score for the team result

== Participation ==
An unofficial count yields the participation of 141 athletes from 32 countries in the Senior women's race. This is in agreement with the official numbers as published.

- Argentina (4)
- Australia (6)
- Austria (1)
- Belgium (4)
- Brazil (5)
- Canada (5)
- China (4)
- Denmark (3)
- Fiji (4)
- Finland (4)
- France (6)
- Hong Kong (4)
- India (4)
- Ireland (6)
- Italy (6)
- Japan (6)
- Kenya (6)
- Liechtenstein (1)
- Mauritius (1)
- Nepal (4)
- New Zealand (6)
- Norway (6)
- Poland (2)
- Portugal (5)
- Soviet Union (6)
- Spain (6)
- Sweden (2)
- Switzerland (4)
- United Kingdom (6)
- United States (6)
- West Germany (4)
- Zambia (4)

== See also ==
- 1988 IAAF World Cross Country Championships – Senior men's race
- 1988 IAAF World Cross Country Championships – Junior men's race
