= Alison Robinson =

Ceramicist (1938–2022)

- Born: 24 February 1938; Suez, Egypt
- Died: October 10, 2022 (aged 84); UK
- Known for: Pottery
- Spouse: David Robinson
- Children: 3

Alison Robinson (24 February 1938 - 10 October 2022) was a ceramicist who spent a lot of her life and work in Edinburgh. In 2009 she founded Bridge Pottery Collective to ensure that young ceramists had an environment to work and share their art.

== Early life and education ==
Alison Robinson was born on 24 February 1938, in Suez, Egypt to English parents Irene and Jim Chaplin; she had an older sister, Leila. The family later moved to Dartington, England. There, Robinson discovered her life long passion for clay. She used to play with it by the side of local river. After graduating from Totnes High, she studied at Bath Academy of Art, where she studied under Howard Hodgkin. Later, she studied at Moray House College.

== Career ==
After moving to Edinburgh in the 1960s, Robinson taught at Edinburgh Academy and gave classes at Edinburgh Council.

In the 1980s, Robinson worked under ceramicist Margery Clinton, who bequeathed Robinson specialist kilns and recipes in her will.

Robinson founded Poldrate Pottery in 1986. There, she trained various women, including Alison Watt to create and decorate pottery for sale.

She founded Bridge Pottery Collective in 2009.

Robinson's work is mostly focused on reduction lustre, a technique that gives a metallic shine to the ceramic art.

== Personal life ==
In the 1960s, Robinson moved to Edinburgh with her sister.

Robinson's first daughter, Chloe, died in a car crash. Robinson later married David Robinson, who also taught at Edinburgh University. The couple at two children.

In the 1970s, the family moved from Stockbridge to Gifford then to Haddington in the 1980s and Portobello in the 1990s.
