= Paulo Catarino =

Portuguese long-distance runner

Personal information
- Nationality: Portuguese
- Born: 30 September 1963 (age 62)

Sport
- Sport: Long-distance running
- Event: Marathon

Achievements and titles
- Olympic finals: 1988 Summer Olympics

Paulo Catarino (born 30 September 1963) is a Portuguese long-distance runner. He competed in the men's marathon at the 1988 Summer Olympics. He won the December, 1994 edition of the Macau Marathon in 2:15.28.
