= Rajesh Kumar Singh (Bihar politician, born 1972) =

Indian politician

Member of Bihar Legislative Council
- In office 2009 – July 2015
- Preceded by: Kapildev Prasad Singh
- Succeeded by: Reena Devi
- Constituency: Nalanda Local Authority

Personal details
- Born: 26 May 1972 (age 54) Bihar Sharif,Nalanda district, Bihar, India
- Party: Janata Dal
- Other political affiliations: Lok Janshakti Party
- Spouse: Reena Devi
- Parent: Ramvriksh Prasad (Father)
- Education: Intermediate
- Nickname: Raju Yadav

Rajesh Kumar Singh, also known as Raju Yadav, is an Indian politician who served as a member of the Bihar Legislative Council to the Nalanda local bodies from 2009 to July 2015. He won the M.L.C. election in July 2009 as a Lok Janshakti Party candidate. At present he is a member of Janata Dal (United). His wife Reena Devi also represents the same seat from 2015.

== Personal life ==
He is married to Reena Devi who became member of Bihar Legislative Council after he retired from active politics in 2015.

== See also ==
- Nitish Kumar
- Government of Bihar
- Lalu Prasad Yadav
- Kapildev Singh
