= Vitaliy Shafar =

Ukrainian long-distance runner

Vitaliy Shafar Vitalii Shafar
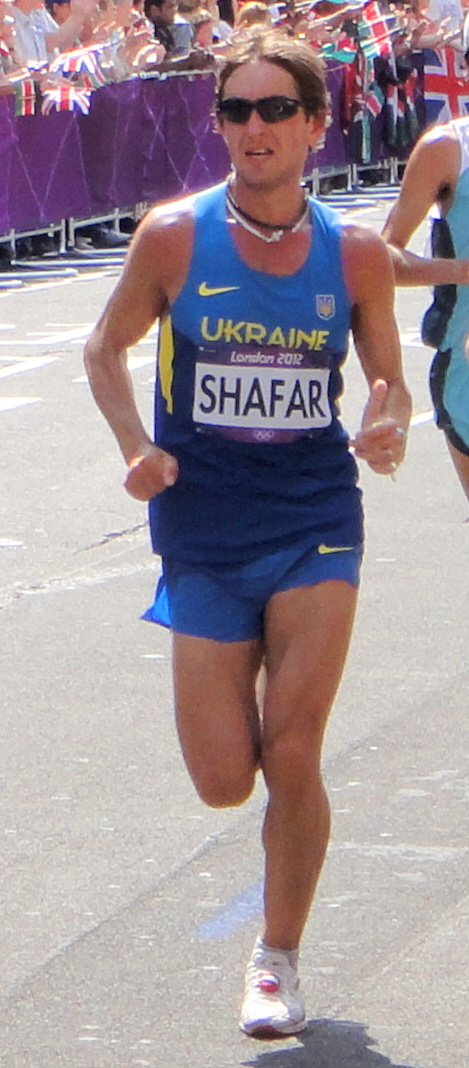
- Shafar in the marathon at the 2012 Summer Olympics in London

Personal information
- Born: January 27, 1982 (age 44) Lutsk, Ukrainian SSR, Soviet Union
- Height: 1.74 m (5 ft 8 1/2 in)
- Weight: 62 kg (137 lb)

Sport
- Country: Ukraine
- Sport: Athletics
- Event: Marathon

Vitaliy Shafar or Vitalii Shafar (Ukrainian: Віталій Шафар, born 27 January 1982 in Lutsk) is a Ukrainian long-distance runner. At the 2012 Summer Olympics, he competed in the Men's marathon, finishing in 29th place. He finished fourth in the 2014 Boston Marathon and tenth at the 2015 Boston Marathon.

He won the Macau Marathon in 2015 in 2:14.44 and set a personal best of 2:09:53 hours for the marathon at the 2014 Toronto Waterfront Marathon.

Served a 3 year doping ban in 2017 that retroactively disqualified performances since 2014 due to AIU doping violations(biological passport). This suspension ended on August 31, 2020.
