= Yuko Gordon =

Japanese marathon runner

Medal record

Women's athletics

Representing Hong Kong

Asian Championships
Silver medal – second place	1985 Jakarta	Marathon

Yuko Gordon (née Hasegawa; Japanese: ユーコ・ゴードン; born 23 February 1951) is a Japan-born Hong Kong long-distance runner who competed mainly in the marathon. She represented her country in that event at the 1984 Summer Olympics and the 1983 World Championships in Athletics. She holds a personal best of 2:38:32 hours, set in 1987.

Competing in the 1980s, she was the first international standard marathon runner from Hong Kong and was twice winner of the Macau Marathon, Hong Kong Marathon, and Bangkok Marathon. She was originally from Japan but opted to represent Hong Kong, (her adopted nation by marriage) and enjoyed international competition for the first time in her thirties.

She was a silver medallist in the marathon at the 1985 Asian Athletics Championships, finishing behind India's Asha Agarwal.

She continued running in her later years as a masters athlete and won the women's under-45 category for the 5000 metres at the 1997 World Masters Athletics Championships.

On the 29th of September 2019, Yuko broke the world record marathon time in her single age category (68 year old) in the Berlin marathon with a time of 3:19:37.

== International competitions ==
Year	Competition	Venue	Position	Event	Notes
1983	World Championships	Helsinki, Finland	35th	Marathon	2:48:51
1984	Olympic Games	Los Angeles, United States	34th	Marathon	2:46:12
1985	Asian Championships	Jakarta, Indonesia	2nd	Marathon	2:54:16
1985	IAAF World Cup	Canberra, Australia	—	10,000 m	DNF
1985	World Marathon Cup	Hiroshima, Japan	28th	Marathon	2:45:29
1988	World Cross Country Championships	Auckland, New Zealand	92nd	Senior race	21:15
1988	World Cross Country Championships	Auckland, New Zealand	21st	Team	436 pts
1988	IAAF World Women's Road Race Championships	Adelaide, Australia	64th	15 km	57:11

== Road race wins ==
- Macau Marathon: 1983, 1985
- Hong Kong Marathon: 1983, 1984
- Bangkok Marathon: 1987, 1988

== See also ==
- Neko Hiroshi, Japanese runner who competed for Cambodia
