= Kapildev Prasad Singh =

Indian politician (1952–2021)

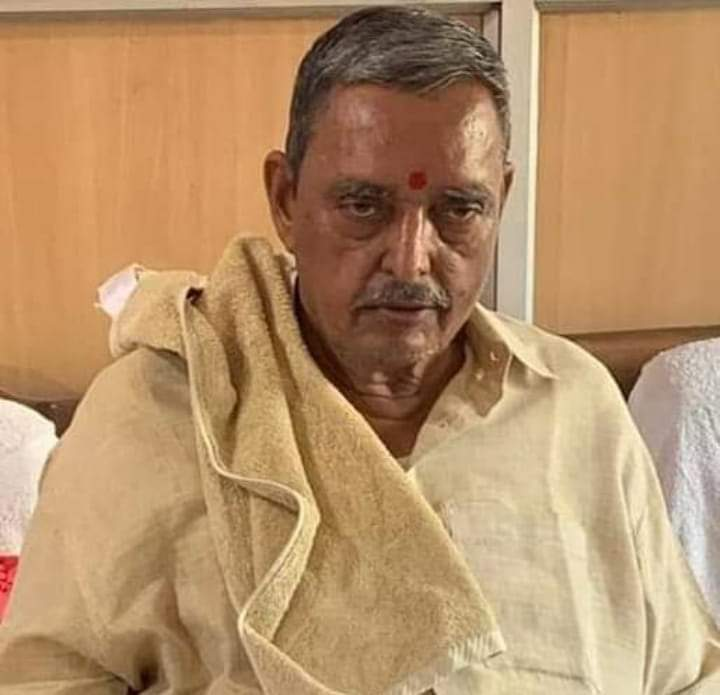
- Singh in 2017

Member of Bihar Legislative Council
- In office 17 July 2003 – 16 July 2009
- Governor: M R Jois; Buta Singh; R.S. Gavai; R.L. Bhatia
- Chief Minister: Rabri Devi; Nitish Kumar
- Preceded by: Post established
- Succeeded by: Raju Yadav
- Constituency: Nalanda

Chairperson, District Councils of India
- In office 10 June 2001 – 16 July 2003
- District: Nalanda

Chairperson, Bihar Prison Reform Committee
- In office 2006–2008
- Chairman: Jabir Husain
- Appointed: Bihar Legislative Council

Personal details
- Born: 2 February 1952 Pokharpur, Bihar, India
- Died: 2 January 2021 (aged 69) Patna, Bihar, India
- Party: Independent
- Other political affiliations: Bharatiya Janata Party; Lok Janshakti Party
- Spouse: Sunila Devi
- Children: Sanjay Sinha; Pankaj Sinha; Shashikant
- Occupation: Politician
- Website: Sanjay Sinha
- Nickname: Kapildeo Babu
- As of 19 July, 2003

Kapildev Prasad Singh, also known as Kapildeo Babu (2 February 1952 – 2 January 2021), was an Indian politician and a former member of the Bihar Legislative Council from Nalanda constituency. He also served as a chairperson of the District Council of Nalanda from 2001 to July 2003. He joined the Bharatiya Janata Party early in his political career.

== Biography ==
=== Personal life and background ===
Kapildev Prasad Singh was born on 2 February 1952 in Pokharpur village of Nalanda district. His father, Kameshwar Prasad Singh, was a farmer in the village. He was the third among four brothers. His elder brother Mahesh Prasad Singh was active in politics; he was Mukhiya of the Pokharpur village council in the 1960s. At that time, he was also made the block president of Giriyak block, and was a member of Indian National Congress. His family has considerable influence in the politics of the Pokharpur village council (now the Nagar Panchayat of Pawapuri). One of his nephews and son of Mahesh, Kamta Prasad Singh, was the unopposed mukhiya of the council in 2001. Kunti Devi, the wife of Kapildev's younger brother, also represented Pokharpur twice from 2006 to 2016.

Another nephew of his, Dinesh Prasad Singh, was a businessman and Central Public Works Department (CPWD) contractor who was murdered by unknown criminals at his hotel in Pokharpur.

Singh was married to Sunila Devi in 1970, and had three sons. His elder son Sanjay Sinha is a businessman and social worker in Nalanda. His second son Pankaj Sinha is also in social work in Pawapuri, and his youngest son Shashikant is a doctor. Singh belonged to the Bhumihar caste in Bihar.

=== Early career ===
In 1990, Singh was active in social work in the area of Pawapuri and Nalanda. In 1993 he joined the Bharatiya Janata Party (BJP) as a party worker of the Nalanda district unit. He is known in the area as Kapildeo Babu. Singh played an important role in getting Pokharpur the status of model village in the 1990s, given by then-Prime Minister Chandra Shekhar.

== Political career ==
Singh started his political career by contesting in a panchayat election. After the dissolution of the panchayati raj, a new election was held in Bihar in April 2001. Singh contested for the post of district councilor from Nalanda's Giriyak block, and won the election. In June 2001, he was elected as a chairperson of the Nalanda district council.

In 2003, Bihar Legislative Council elections were held. Singh contested for the election from Nalanda constituency as an independent candidate, and won by receiving 100 more votes than his nearest rival, Raju Yadav.

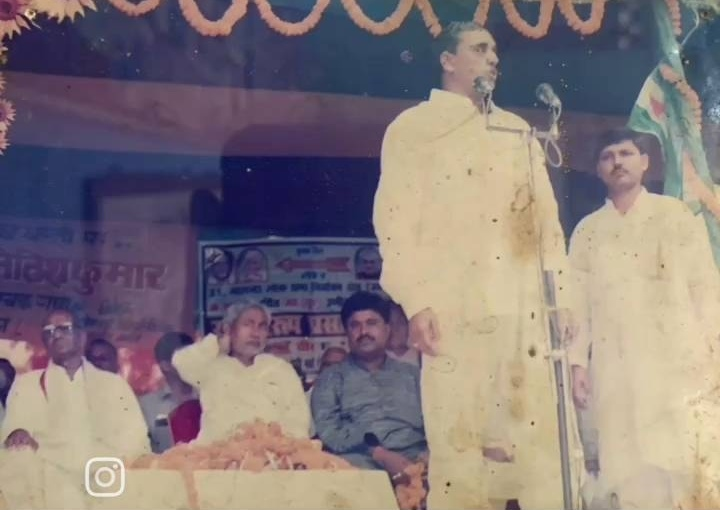
Singh addressing the public during the Nalanda by-election in 2006

He campaigned for the National Democratic Alliance (NDA) in the Nalanda Lok Sabha by-election held in October–November 2006. On the request of BJP leadership, he had appealed to vote for Nitish Kumar's candidate Ram Swaroop Prasad. Singh was President of the Bihar Legislative Council's Prison Reform Committee in 2006. He was close to Bihar Chief Minister Rabri Devi, and during that time also contacted the founder of the Lok Janshakti Party (LJP) and then-Minister of Chemicals and Fertilizers, Ram Vilas Paswan.

In 2009, Singh wanted to contest the Lok Sabha elections from Nawada on the BJP ticket, but for some reason he could not. Later, Bhola Singh from BJP was fielded in his place.

Singh wanted to contest on BJP's ticket in the 2010 Bihar Legislative Assembly elections, but the NDA (which BJP was a member of) agreed to support Janata Dal (United) (JDU)'s candidates for Nawada and Asthawan. Therefore he decided to contest on the Grand Alliance ticket. His first priority was the Nawada seat, but the alliance assigned it to Rashtriya Janata Dal (RJD). Instead, the alliance had Singh run as LJP's candidate for Asthawan, and RJD had Raj Ballabh Yadav contest from Nawada. But, he failed to win. At the time, under the influence of Nitish Kumar, the Grand Alliance lost the elections badly. Later, Singh was involved in social work, and after some time became inactive for health reasons.

== Controversies ==
According to the Bihar magazine Samkaalin Tapman, in 201 there was tension in Nalanda regarding the district council and panchayat elections, especially regarding the council chairman election. On June 6, 2001, just four days before the chairman election, Sudhir Singh, a district councilor who had won from Bind, and Tripurari Singh (T. P. Singh Mahto) of Nalanda were murdered. In that incident another district councilor from Bind, Rakesh Kumar (Bihari), was also severely injured. Kapildev's name was discussed in the political circles of Nalanda, Nawada, and surrounding districts regarding the murders, and tensions rose when he was elected Chairman on June 10. Because Tripurari had also been a Bind resident, Kapildev wanted to make Sudhir the chairman, but he was killed alongside Tripurari. Both of them were murdered near "Golapar" Jamali Chowk More situated on Bihar Sharif Parwalpur Road. At that time, Gupteshwar Pandey was Nalanda's superintendent of police and was investigating the incident. During the investigation, he did not find any connection of Kapildev Singh to the incident. Later, former Legislative Councilor Raju Yadav, former Bihar MLA Sharif Pappu Khan, and Bhushan Singh also came under suspicion for the murders.

According to a local media and Times of India report, during the legislative council elections held in 2003, several violent clashes took place in Nalanda. After Singh's election as Legislative Councilor, his supporters raised his victory slogan in the counting complex of Sogra College, Biharsharif, which irritated supporters of rival candidate Raju Yadav. In return, they beat up Singh's supporters, after which there was a lot of uproar in the district. Later, in reaction to the incident, Singh's supporters blocked the Patna–Ranchi main road. Amit Lodha, Superintendent of Police of Nalanda at that time, pacified the angry crowd and both parties reconciled.

At that time, crime was at its peak in Bihar, with the murder of panchayat candidates becoming common in Nalanda. One night in 2003, armed criminals attacked Singh's petrol station at Pawapuri, in an alleged act of retribution for the recently-held legislative council elections. But that night, Singh was not at the petrol station, and his supporters and others chased away the alleged attackers. The atmosphere of fear at that time was such that several armed squads were deployed outside his residence for his security.

== After death ==
On 2 January 2021, Singh died in Patna, Bihar. After his death, Governor of Bihar and Chief Minister Nitish Kumar expressed condolences to his family, and went to Singh's residence in Pawapuri to console his family members.

On 2 January 2022, a life-size statue of Singh was unveiled at his residence by then-Union Minister Ramchandra Prasad Singh and former Bihar Minister Nand Kishore Yadav.

== Gallery ==
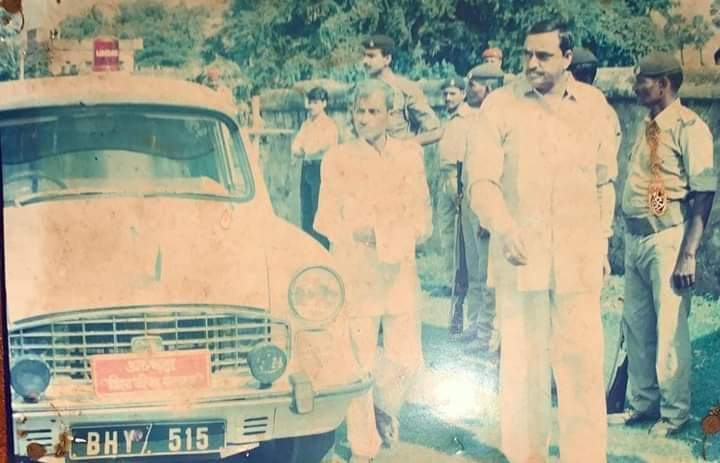
Singh as Nalanda District Councilor in Biharsharif, 2001

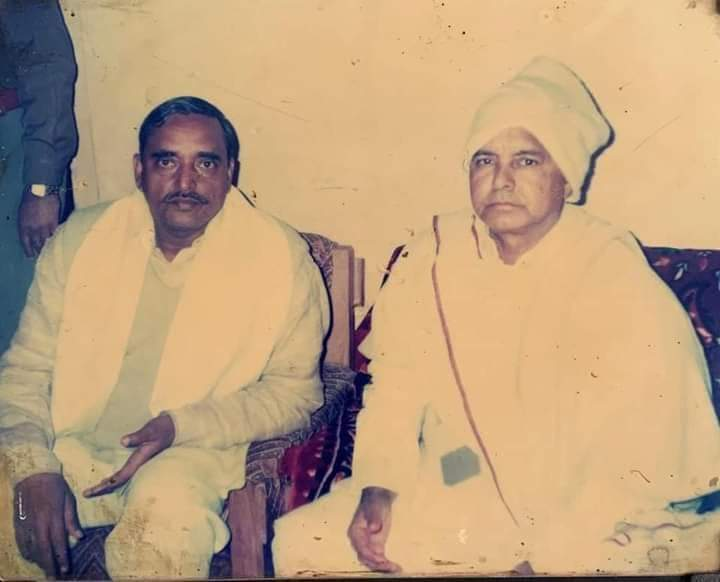
In 2004, Lalu Prasad Yadav with Singh at his residence in Pokharpur

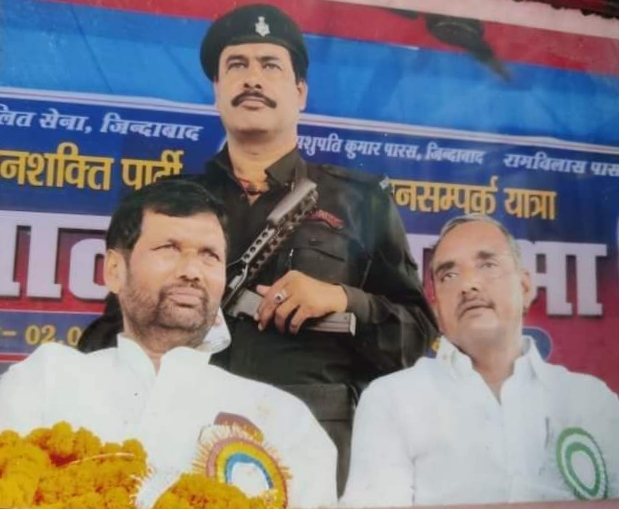
Singh with Ram Vilas Paswan at a public meeting in Asthawan during the 2010 Bihar elections

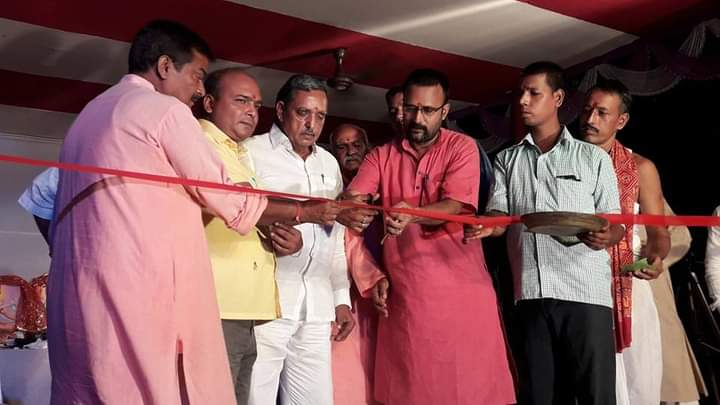
Singh inaugurating Dussehra Jagran in Pokharpur in 2016

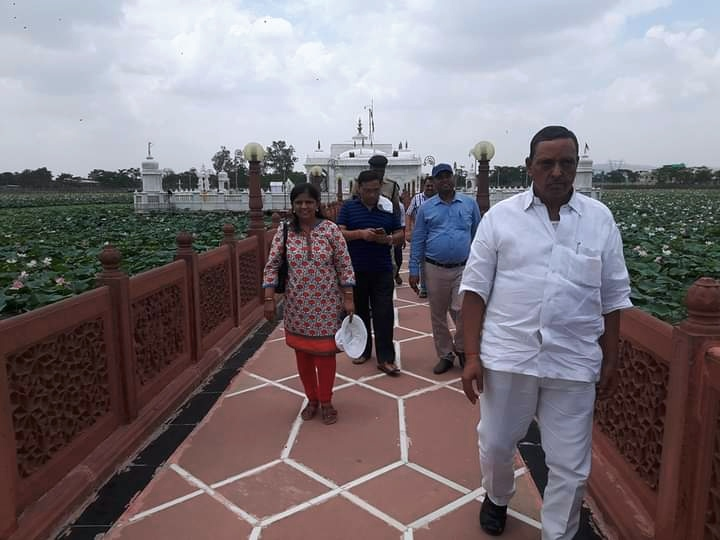
Singh in Jal Mandir, Pawapuri in 2017

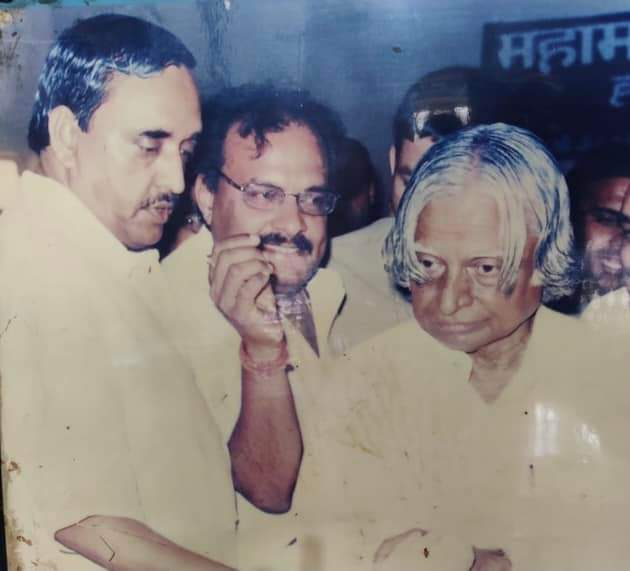
On 31 May 2003, Singh (far left) during President of India, A. P. J. Abdul Kalam's visit of Jal Mandir

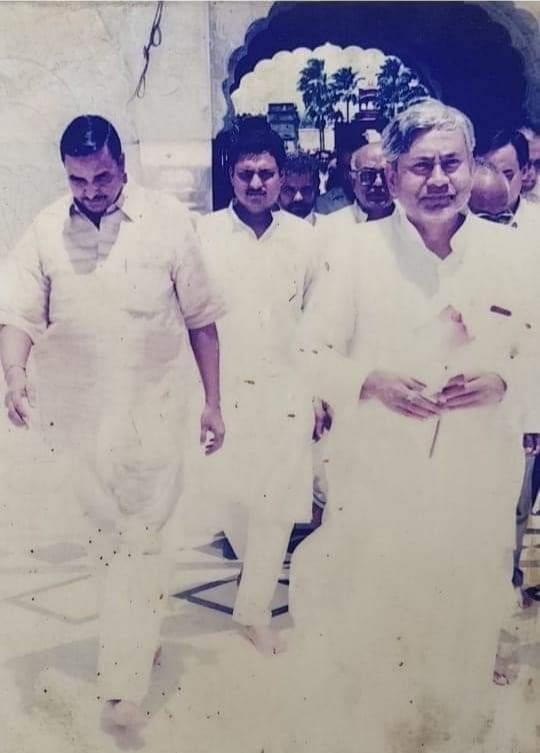
In 2004, Singh with Nitish Kumar in Pawapuri

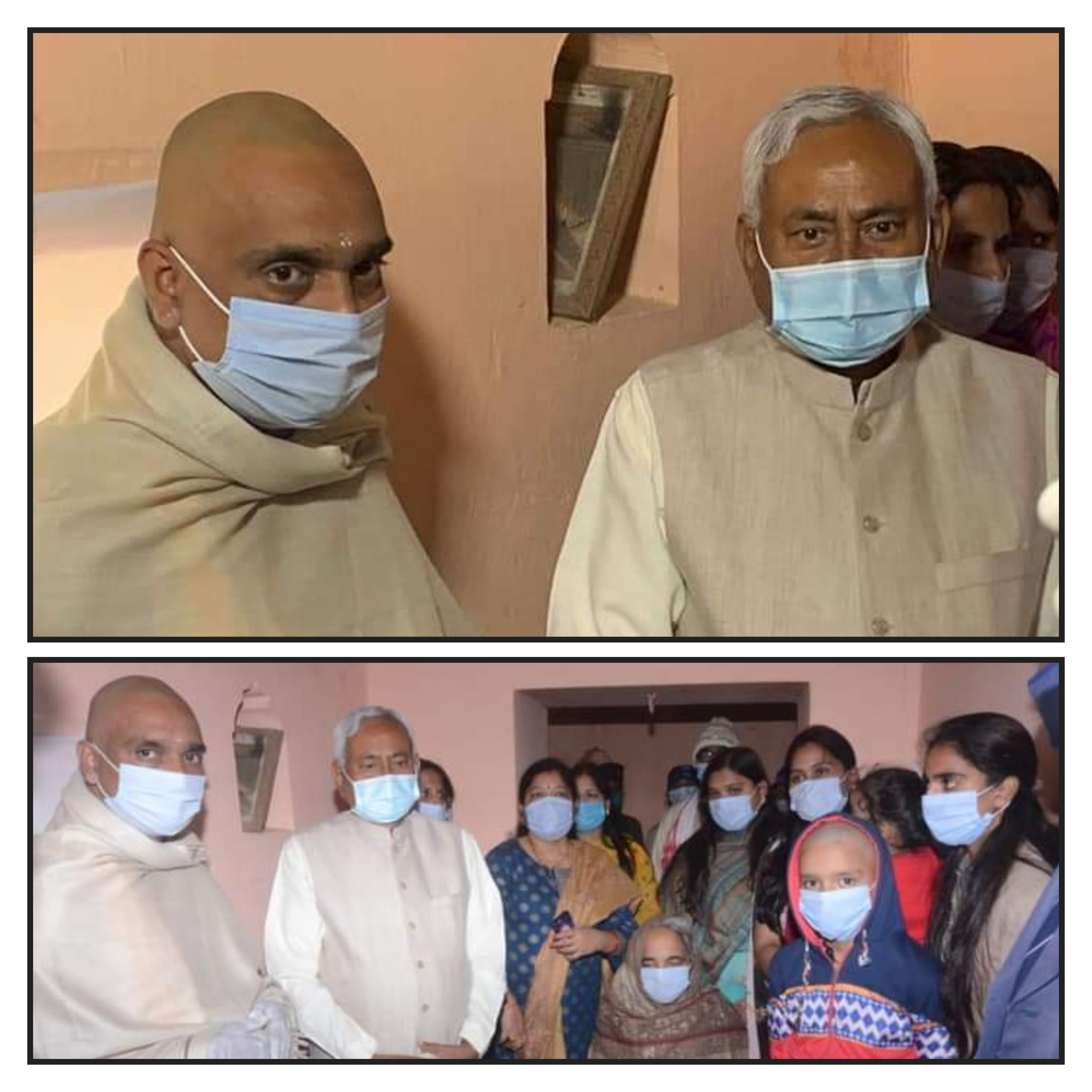
Chief Minister Nitish Kumar visiting Singh's Pokharpur residence to console his family after his death

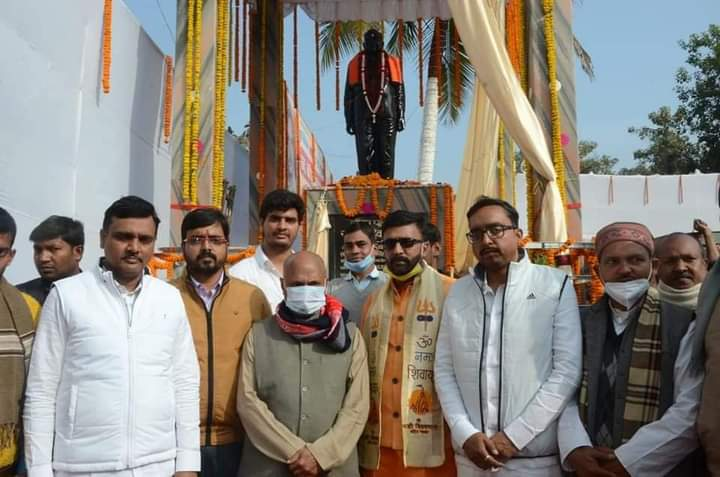
In 2022, Union Minister RCP Singh and Kapildev's elder son Sanjay (left) at the unveiling ceremony of Kapildev's statue in Pawapuri

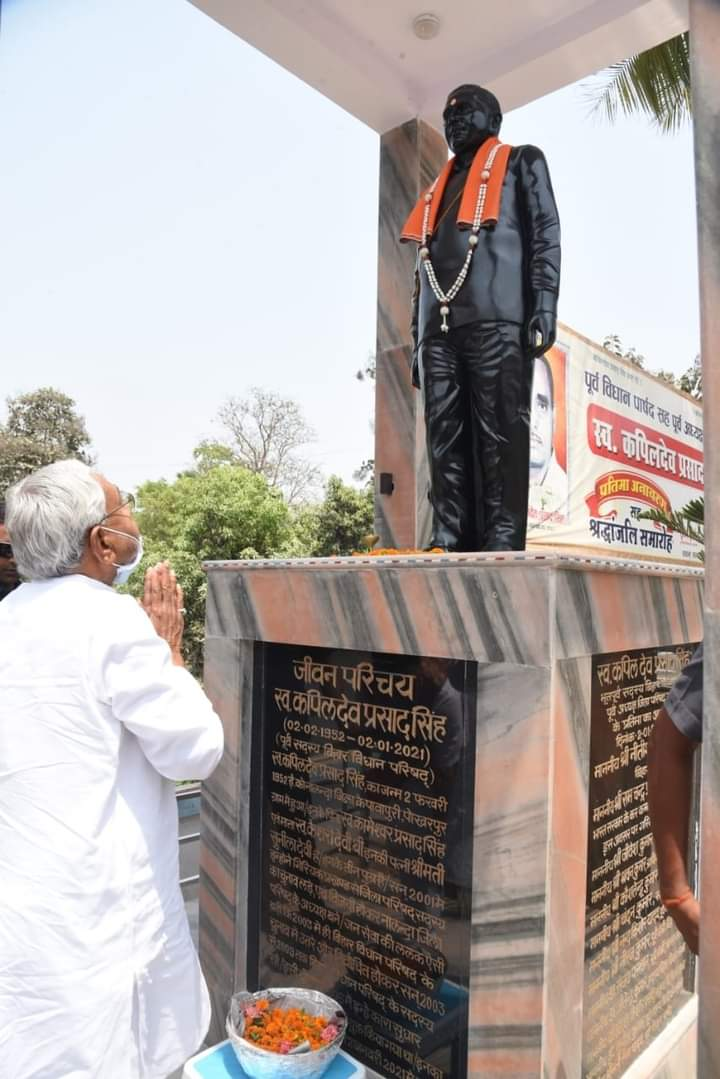
Nitish Kumar paying homage to Singh's statue in 2022

== See also ==
- C. P. Thakur
- List of politicians from Bihar
- List of members of the Bihar Legislative Council
