= Macau Marathon =

Annual race in China held since 1981

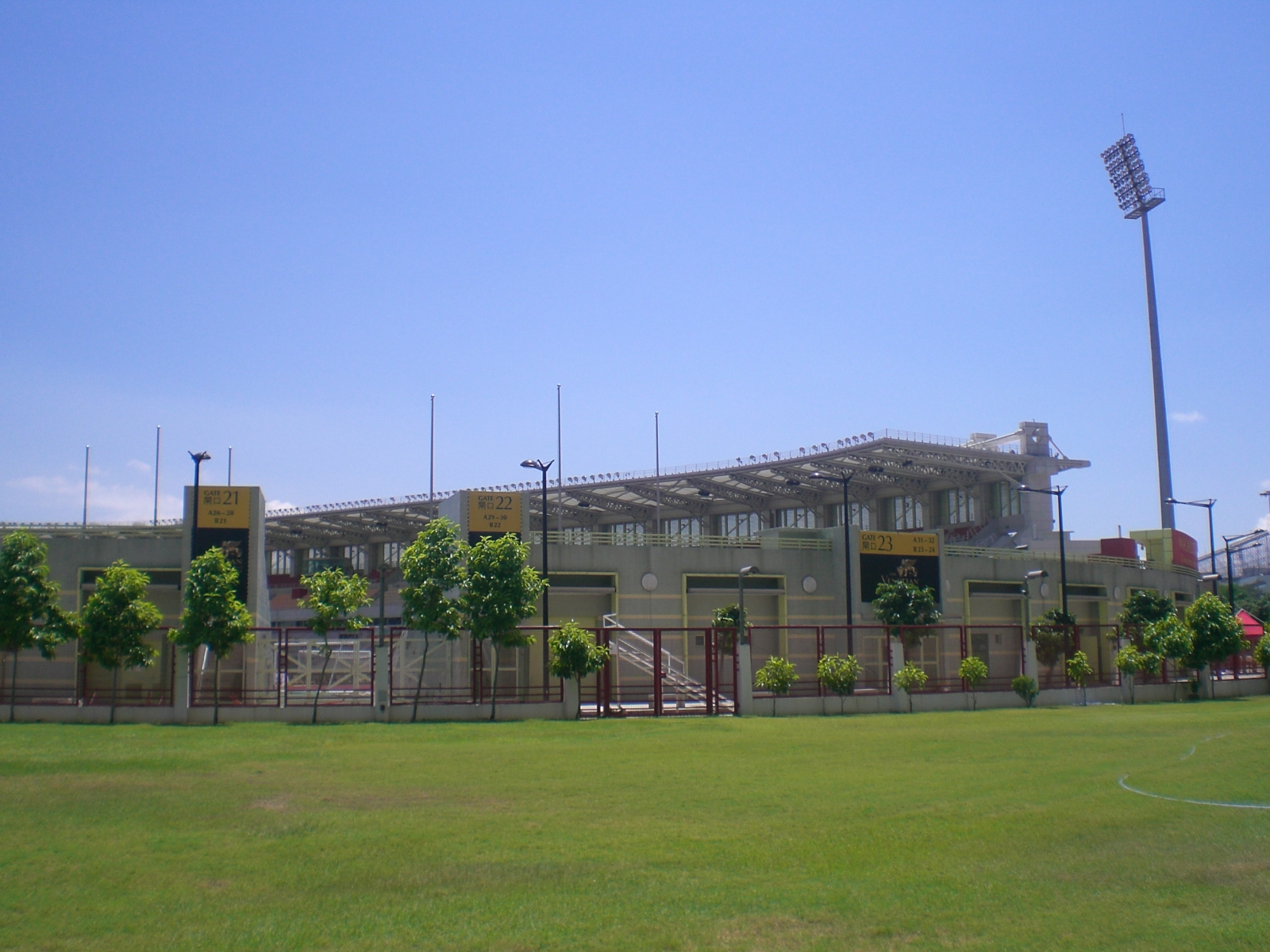
- Olympic Sports Centre Stadium, start and finish area
- Date: Early December
- Location: Macau, China
- Event type: Road
- Distance: Marathon
- Primary sponsor: Galaxy Entertainment
- Established: 1981 (45 years ago)
- Course records: Men: 2:09:27 (2025) (Kenya) Victor Kipchirchir; Women: 2:28:43 (2020) (China) Zhang Deshun
- Website: Macau Marathon
- Participants: 759 finishers (2021); 741 finishers (2020); 1,057 (2019); 1,048 (2018)

The Macau International Marathon (Chinese: 澳门国际马拉松; Portuguese: Maratona Internacional de Macau) is an annual road running event held in the special administrative region of Macau adjacent to mainland China, since 1981. The marathon begins and ends at the Olympic Sports Centre Stadium. Since 1998, three races have been held at each edition: the full marathon, a half marathon, and a shorter mini-marathon of roughly 6.5 km (4.0 mi) in length.

== History ==
The event was first held in 1981 under the organisation of the Panda Running Club and was the first international marathon to be held in the region. The Macau Athletic Association took over organisational duties in 1987 and the race was accepted as a member of the AIMS Racing Group in 1990.

In 1997, the annual marathon race was suspended due to the opening of the Macau Olympic Stadium, but a half marathon was held for the first time in its place that year, maintaining the race continuity.

In 2012, marathoners ran up to an additional 3 km (2 mi) due to a marshalling error, and many half marathoners also ran about 1 km (0.6 mi) more than intended due to a number of issues.

== Course ==
External images
- Course map of full marathon in 2020
- Course map of full marathon in 2021

The course begins and ends at the Olympic Sports Centre Stadium, and traverses the Taipa and Hengqin islands as well as the Cotai zone.

== Sponsorship ==
The event is sponsored by Galaxy Entertainment Group, a casino and hotel investment company.

== Participation ==
The marathon race attracts a majority of overseas runners, with average yearly totals of around 500 entrants and 400 finishers. The marathon's participation record was achieved in 1984, with 1121 runners starting the race and 932 of them finishing. The shorter distances are more popular with both Macau and foreign athletes. Since its introduction in 1997, the half marathon has gone from 348 finishers to a record high of 1279 finishers in 2006. The mini-marathon was inaugurated a year after the half marathon and instantly gained high participation (1111 runners took part in 1997 and a high of 1767 participants was reached in 2009).

In addition to the large numbers of amateur runners who take part in the event, the marathon features elite level runners from East Asia, Africa and Europe.

== Winners ==
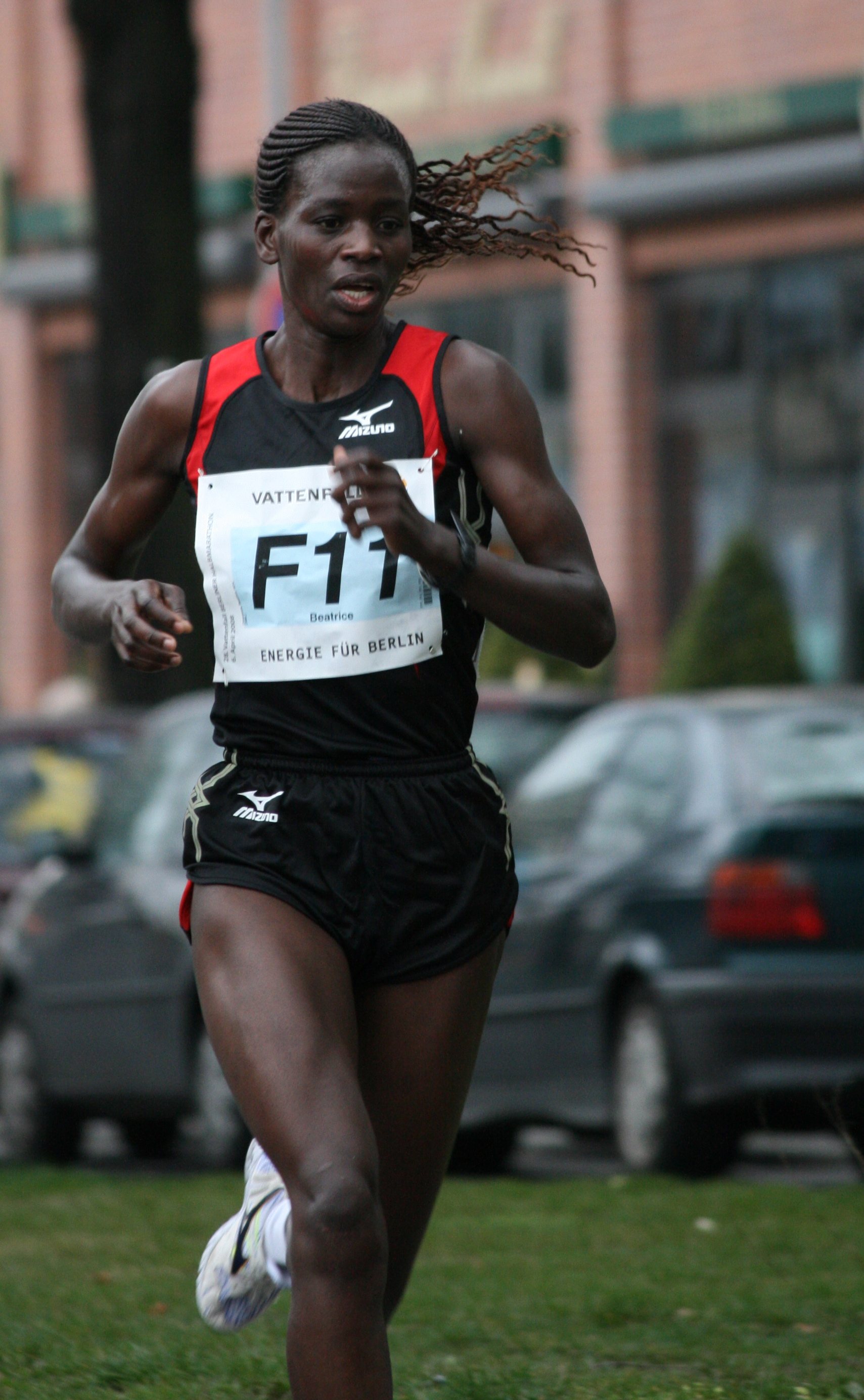
Beatrice Omwanza (pictured here in Berlin) won the half marathon in 1997, when the marathon was suspended.

Key:

Course record (in bold)
Held as half marathon

Ed.	Year	Men's winner	Time	Women's winner	Time	Rf.
1	1981	Tom Flett (HKG)	2:41:42	Tak Wai (HKG)	3:12:42	
2	1982	Antonio Eratavo (ITA)	2:21:54	Fung-fan Wong (HKG)	3:17:18	
3	1983	Antonio Eratavo (ITA)	2:25:00	Yuko Gordon (HKG)	2:58:26	
4	1984	Antonio Eratavo (ITA)	2:24:29	Fung-fan Wong (HKG)	3:00:04	
5	1985	Antonio Eratavo (ITA)	2:20:18	Yuko Gordon (HKG)	2:48:18	
6	1986	Antonio Eratavo (ITA)	2:26:47	Fung-fan Wong (HKG)	3:41:16	
7	1987	Zhang Guowei (CHN)	2:16:21	Hong-wei Tang (CHN)	2:58:24	
8	1988	Chao-ai Gao (CHN)	2:19:18	Elizabeth Hintz (HKG)	2:57:03	
9	1989	António Costa (POR)	2:18:37	Suk-yee Lau (HKG)	3:07:11	
10	1990	António Costa (POR)	2:17:37	Yi-Lo Man (HKG)	2:58:25	
11	1991	António Costa (POR)	2:17:58	Yi-Lo Man (HKG)	2:52:54	
12	1992	Jerry Modiga (RSA)	2:18:31	Yi-Lo Man (HKG)	2:51:18	
13	1993	Hu Gangjun (CHN)	2:19:12	Li Yemei (CHN)	2:39:20	
14	1994	Paulo Catarino (POR)	2:15:28	Li Yemei (CHN)	2:38:18	
15	1995	Henrique Crisóstomo (POR)	2:15:39	Li Yemei (CHN)	2:40:47	
16	1996	Dong Jiangmin (CHN)	2:16:30	Yelena Makolova (BLR)	2:40:13	
–	1997	Hezron Otwori (KEN)	1:02:55	Beatrice Omwanza (KEN)	1:15:31	
17	1998	Henrique Crisóstomo (POR)	2:19:44	Lyubov Denisova (RUS)	2:37:55	
18	1999	Kim Jung-won (PRK)	2:15:21	Kim Chang-ok (PRK)	2:34:57	
19	2000	Willie Mtolo (RSA)	2:19:25	Lu Jingbo (CHN)	2:47:15	
20	2001	Benjamin Matolo (KEN)	2:18:58	Ren Xiujuan (CHN)	2:42:11	
21	2002	Zhu Ronghua (CHN)	2:19:09	Catherine Leonard (GBR)	3:20:49	
22	2003	Kasirayi Sita (ZIM)	2:15:58	Catherine Leonard (GBR)	3:16:25	
23	2004	Adam Dobrzyński (POL)	2:16:30	Dai Yanyan (CHN)	2:37:27	
24	2005	Philip Bandawe (ZIM)	2:19:49	Natalya Volgina (RUS)	2:40:59	
25	2006	Peter Kemboi (KEN)	2:18:56	Phyo Un-suk (PRK)	2:38:27	
26	2007	Ri Kum-song (PRK)	2:17:40	Phyo Un-suk (PRK)	2:38:27	
27	2008	Yemane Tsegay (ETH)	2:15:06	Yuan Lili (CHN)	2:36:40	
28	2009	Mihaylo Iveruk (UKR)	2:17:45	Roman Gebregessese (ETH)	2:37:08	
29	2010	Tekesete Nekatibebe (ETH)	2:16:15	Wang Xueqin (CHN)	2:37:37	
30	2011	Stephen Chemlany (KEN)	2:12:49	Tsega Gelaw (ETH)	2:31:48	
31	2012	Haile Haja (ETH)	2:23:56 (Note: The course was 3 km (1.9 mi) too long due to a marshalling error on the course.)	Ehitu Kiros (ETH)	2:50:10	
32	2013	Julius Maisei (KEN)	2:12:43	Kim Mi-gyong (PRK)	2:36:32	
33	2014	Julius Maisei (KEN)	2:14:45	Flomena Chepchirchir (KEN)	2:33:24	
34	2015	Vitaliy Shafar (UKR)	2:14:44	Olena Shurkhno (UKR)	2:33:24	
35	2016	Peter Some (KEN)	2:12:52	Kim Ji-hyang (PRK)	2:36:16	
36	2017	Felix Kirwa (KEN)	2:10:01	Eunice Kirwa (BHR)	2:29:12	
37	2018	Elijah Kemboi (KEN)	2:15:18	Mercy Kibarus (KEN)	2:35:16	
38	2019	Tafese Delelegn (ETH)	2:12:53	Lucy Cheruiyot (KEN)	2:31:17	
39	2020	Dong Guojian (CHN)	2:12:59	Zhang Deshun (CHN)	**2:28:43**	
40	2021	Yang Shaohui (CHN)	2:13:04	Zhang Deshun (CHN)	2:29:09	
41	2022	You Sheng Guan (CHN)	2:19:03	Mei Zhen Li (CHN)	2:40:26	
42	2023	Debele Fikadu Kebebe (ETH)	2:14:05	Zinashwork Yenew Ambi (ETH)	2:33:38	
43	2024	Fikadu Debele (ETH)	2:12:16	Alexandra Morozova (RUS)	2:34:22	
44	2025	Victor Kipchirchir (KEN)	**2:09:27**	Mastewal Birhanu Senay (ETH)	2:31:37	

=== Wins by country ===
Country	Men's race	Women's race	Total
China	6	10	16
Kenya	10	4	14
Hong Kong	1	11	12
Ethiopia	6	5	11
North Korea	2	5	7
Portugal	6	0	6
Italy	5	0	5
Ukraine	2	1	3
Russia	0	3	3
South Africa	2	0	2
Zimbabwe	2	0	2
Bahrain	0	1	1
Belarus	0	1	1
Poland	1	0	1

== See also ==
- Beijing Marathon
- Singapore Marathon
