= Templelands =

Coordinates: 56.00093°N 2.51464°W

1 and 2 Templelands, Dunbar

Templelands is a Georgian terrace in Dunbar, East Lothian, Scotland. According to the listed building report for the property, it dates to circa 1820,. The late ceramist Margery Clinton lived at 2 Templelands between 1995 and 2005. Today number 1 is a private home and pottery studio run by Philip Revell, while number 2 is a private home.

Templelands comprises a terrace of two symmetrical, two-storey-and-basement houses. Each house has three bays. The building has an ashlar front, rubble basement and rear, and rusticated quoins, and other decorative features. The central doorways have Ionic surrounds, panelled doors, and plate glass fanlights. The building was listed at Category B in 1971.
