= Jackie Goodman =

American activist (1946–2025)

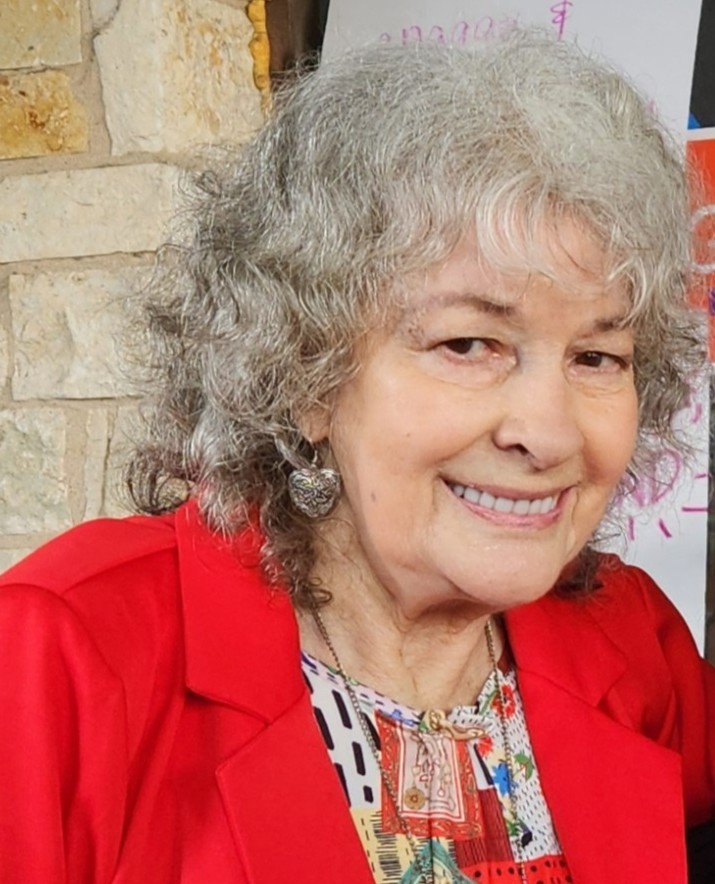

Austin City Council
- In office 1993–2005

Jackie Goodman (May 17, 1946 – June 3, 2025) was an American civic activist and politician who served on the Austin City Council from 1993 to 2005. Before and after her time in elected office, Goodman was active in Austin's environmental and neighborhood movements, particularly on issues involving land use, development, water quality, and neighborhood planning. She was active in Austin's environmental movement and was a founder of Save Austin's Neighborhoods and Environment (SANE). She later served as president of the Save Barton Creek Association and remained involved with the organization for more than three decades. She played a part in the writing the Save Our Springs (SOS) Ordinance, adopted in 1992 to establish water-quality protections for the Barton Springs watershed.

== Early life and education ==
Goodman was born in Lakeland, Florida, on May 17, 1946. She had two sisters, Janis and Joann. Her family moved frequently because of her father's career as a United States Army officer. She graduated from high school in El Paso, Texas, and later attended the University of Texas at El Paso and the El Paso Art Academy.

In the late 1960s, Goodman and her husband, Jack Goodman, moved from El Paso to Austin. She worked as an early childhood educator, including at Open Door Preschool and First United Methodist Preschool.

== Environmental activism ==
Goodman became involved in Austin's environmental and neighborhood movements during the 1970s. She was a founder of Save Austin's Neighborhoods and Environment (SANE), a grassroots organization concerned with development, environmental protection, and neighborhood issues. She also became active in the Save Barton Creek Association, eventually serving as its president and remaining on its board for more than 30 years.

Goodman participated in writing the Save Our Springs (SOS) Ordinance, which Austin adopted in 1992. The ordinance established stringent water-quality protections for the Barton Springs watershed and became a significant part of Austin's environmental regulatory framework.

Before her election to the City Council, Goodman also served on the Austin Planning Commission and Parks and Recreation Board. Her experience on the Planning Commission contributed to her later involvement in land-use and zoning issues on the City Council.

== Austin city council ==
Goodman was elected to the Austin City Council in 1993 under the city's former at-large system and served four consecutive three-year terms, from 1993 to 2005. Her initial election coincided with record voter turnout, reflecting the heightened civic engagement of the period. In 1998, her fellow council members elected her Mayor Pro Tem, a role she held for several years.

Colleagues and political observers regarded Goodman as particularly knowledgeable about Austin's zoning and land-use processes. Travis County Commissioner Brigid Shea credited her with extensive knowledge of the city's zoning system, while political adviser Alfred Stanley described her as a skilled negotiator who sought compromises that balanced neighborhood and environmental concerns with development interests.

During her council tenure, Goodman's policy interests included land-use planning, environmental protection, neighborhood planning, education, libraries, animal welfare, civil liberties, affordable housing, and services for low-income residents. Her background in early childhood education also informed her advocacy for childcare and other services affecting families.

Goodman was involved in several major development and environmental disputes during her council tenure. In 1995, she and council member Gus Garcia supplied votes that helped defeat the so-called "Son of PUD," during the long-running dispute involving Freeport-McMoRan's Barton Creek development project. She was also involved in efforts to obtain federal funding for acquisition of land for the Balcones Canyonlands Preserve.

Goodman's environmental and neighborhood positions did not always align with activists. In 2000, for example, she voted in favor of the Gotham condominium project on Town Lake, a decision that drew criticism from some activists.

Goodman also led an effort involving Austin's council term limits that enabled her to seek another term after reaching the existing limit. She was subsequently reelected in 2002 and served until 2005.

After 10 years on the Austin City Council, Goodman took "a pass on what was probably her best chance ever become mayor", according to the Austin Chronicle. Instead she chose to serve the remaining two years of her council member term.

== Community work ==
Goodman continued her environmental advocacy when she was elected to the city council in 1993, serving the community through her environmental and neighborhood work. After leaving the council in 2005, Goodman she served the Austin coummnity through nonprofit and community organizations. In later years, she worked with Go Austin/Vamos Austin (GAVA), where she advised and mentored younger community organizers on early childhood advocacy, land development policy, neighborhood planning, and the city's activist history. She remained active on environmental causes and neighborhood issues well into her seventies.

== Personal life ==
Goodman's husband, Jack Goodman, was also active in Austin environmental affairs. He served for more than two decades on the board of the Barton Springs/Edwards Aquifer Conservation District. He died three years before Jackie Goodman.

== Death and legacy ==
In 2005, Goodman's last year on the council, the Austin History Center Association invited her to donate her papers to the center’s archives.

In 2016, in recognition of her contributions during her tenure at City Council, Goodman was inducted into the Austin Women's Hall of Fame. The award noted, "From land use planning, environmental stewardship, social services and education to animal rights, civil liberties, libraries and neighborhoods, she found ways to give voice to underserved and underrepresented points of view".

Goodman died in June 2025 at the age of 79, while recovering from surgery earlier in the year. At her request, no formal funeral was held.
