= Reena Devi =

Indian politician

Reena Devi Bihar Legislative Council
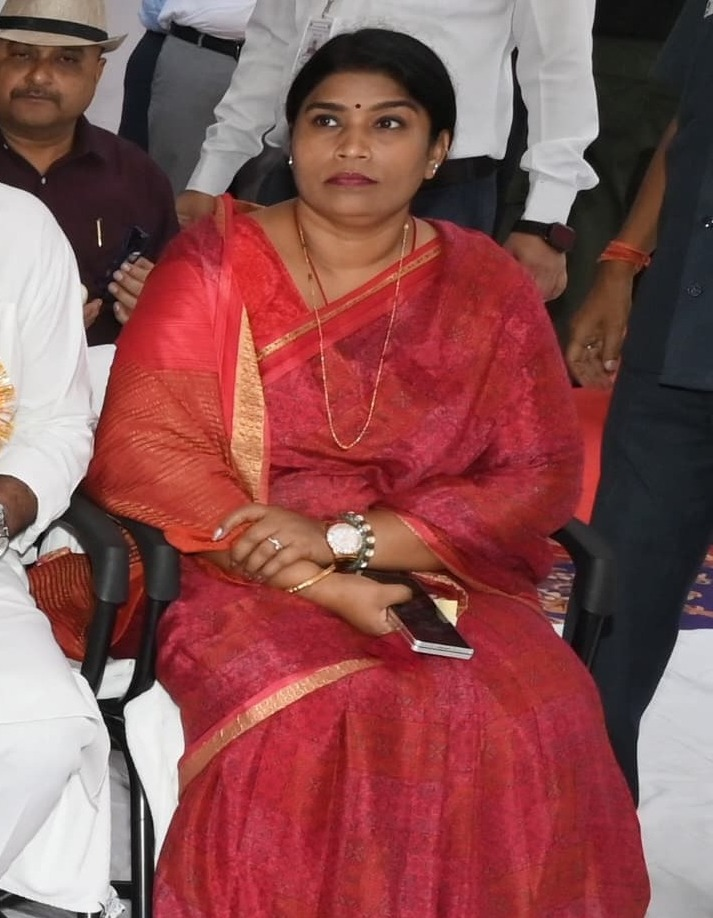

Bihar Legislative Council
- Incumbent
- Assumed office 2015
- Preceded by: Raju Yadav
- Constituency: Nalanda

Personal details
- Born: 4 November 1980 (age 45) Nalanda, Bihar
- Party: Janata Dal (United)
- Spouse: Raju Yadav
- Children: Divyanshu Yadav and Aditya Yadav
- Education: Post Graduate M.A., Patna College Patna 2013

Reena Devi, sometimes known as Reena Yadav, is an Indian politician from Janata Dal (United). She is the member of the Bihar Legislative Council from Nalanda. She has won 2 consecutive MLC elections and before her Raju Yadav, her husband has also held the same office once. She has also been the majority whip in the upper house of State of Bihar. Before Reena, her husband Rajesh Kumar Singh won the same seat and represented Nalanda in the Legislative Council. In the 2022 Bihar MLC elections, Reena won the Nalanda constituency in Bihar for a second term, retaining her seat by a margin of over 1462 votes.

== Political life ==
- Yadav won twice from Nalanda Local Authorities Constituencies in 2022.
- She was elected party Whip in Bihar Legislative Council in 2022.
