= Fulvia Furlan =

Italian long-distance runner

Personal information
- National team: Italy (1 caps 1988)
- Born: 24 July 1958 (age 67) Milan, Italy

Sport
- Country: Italy
- Sport: Athletics
- Events: Long-distance running; Cross country running
- Club: Pro Sesto Milano

Achievements and titles
- Personal bests: 1500 m: 4:25.3 (1985); Half marathon: 1:18:49 (1989)

Fulvia Furlan (born 24 July 1958) is a former Italian female long-distance runner and cross-country runner who competed at individual senior level at the World Athletics Cross Country Championships (1988).
