= Margery Clinton =

Scottish ceramist (1931–2005)

- Born: 1931; Glasgow, United Kingdom
- Died: 2005 (aged 73–74); Edinburgh, United Kingdom
- Known for: Ceramics
- Movement: Lustreware

Margery Clinton (1931–2005) was a Scottish ceramist and a specialist in reduction lustre glazes. She studied painting at the Glasgow School of Art between 1949 and 1953 and was part of the Young Glasgow group, whose inaugural exhibition was held at the McLellan Galleries in 1958. Clinton developed an interest in ceramics before going on to research reduction lustre glazes at the Royal College of Art in the early 1970s. It was there in London where she began research the lustre glass technique of Louis Comfort Tiffany.

In 1978 she set up a workshop at Newton Port, Haddington in Scotland and worked there in partnership with Jan Williamson until 1981. She was assisted by Evelyn Corbett for many years. Clinton continued there until 1995 when she moved to a new studio at Templelands, Dunbar.

Clinton undertook a number of notable architectural commissions later in her life, and her work with tiles was regarded as spectacular. She has been exhibited at the Tate, the Victoria and Albert Museum, the Glasgow Art Gallery and the Royal Museum of Scotland. Her tile work in public place is enduring and durable. Examples of Clinton's tile work can be seen in the Mary Erskine School in Edinburgh and even the staff toilets at the Scottish National Portrait Gallery. In her late work, Clinton worked with paperclay, added about 1.5% paper to clay, totally changing its character.

She authored Working with lustres (also titled Lustres), published by Batsford in 1991, now Anova Books, an accessible treatment of the techniques used in much of her signature work.

A comprehensive inventory of her recipes and research of lustres is held by the National Library of Scotland along with her correspondence, financial records, and working papers 1969 –95.

Her work is included in the collection of the Tate Museum.
