= Catherine Rooney =

Irish nationalist and republican

- Born: Catherine Byrne; 14 April 1896; Dublin, Ireland
- Died: 1971 (aged 74–75); Dublin, Ireland

Catherine Rooney (née Byrne; 1896–1971) was an Irish nationalist and republican active during the Easter Rising of 1916 and the War of Independence.

== Early life ==
Catherine Elizabeth Byrne was born on Dominick Street in Dublin on 14 April 1896 to Peter Byrne and Catherine Dowling. Her father was a coach trimmer in Dublin. She was one of 12 surviving children. She left school at 14 to work as a shop assistant. In 1915 when her brother Paddy joined the Irish Volunteers, she joined Cumann na mBan. She took part in all the drills and gained certificates in first aid.

== Easter Rising ==
On the Monday of Easter 1916, her brother was already out taking part when Sean Flood told her the Rising had begun. When she got home her mother told her to get her things and follow them. She went straight to the headquarters at the General Post Office. When she got there the men didn't want to let her in yet so she got a boost to a side window and kicked it in. The bandages she used for the first wounded were made from her petticoat.

Liam Clarke was her first patient, he had a head wound from an explosion which she patched up until he could be got to a First Aid Station at Father Matthew Hall. Thomas Corbally was one of her first patients as he was cut entering the GPO.

During the week of the Rising Rooney was sent on multiple missions. She was sent to the Hibernian Bank while under fire and later back to the GPO, to the Four Courts and on to Capel St. During her missions she was nearly shot, finding bullet holes in her beret. She had a variety of ways of carrying messages so they would not be found. On one trip to the Four Courts she tied the note up in her hair. She ended the week working in the King Street garrison. She managed to evade arrest when the rebels surrendered.

== After the Rising ==
After the Rising Rooney went with her sister to work in Glasgow. Since they knew no one there they soon joined the local Cumann and got involved again. Alec Carmichael had arranged for the women to visit home and transport ammunition, explosives and fuse. The day before travel Rooney was in a tram accident and the police were involved. Transport during the First World War was difficult but through careful application of stories and wearing the fuses on her arm in a sling as if injured, which was supported by the injuries from the tram accident, they managed to get through. Once they returned to Glasgow and waited a few months they managed to repeat the exercise. Later in 1918 she was holding ammunition and gunpowder for Joe Robinson who was under suspicion. In 1919 she returned home for the last time, bringing another round of ammunition and explosives.

Rooney moved home which was being used by the Volunteers for storing ammunition, having meetings and collecting anything needed as well as hiding men who were hiding from the authorities. She went on various activities like helping check out an ambush site in advance and being present during it to hide the guns for any men who fell.

The Byrne house was used as a first aid station and Rooney was the nurse on duty for the wounded men during Bloody Sunday.

Rooney married in 1922 in Dublin and died in March 1971.
