= Satu Levelä =

Finnish long-distance runner (born 1967)

Satu Levelä (born 8 October 1967) is a retired female long-distance runner from Finland.

Levelä was an All-American runner for the UTEP Miners track and field team, finishing 5th in the 3000 metres at the 1991 NCAA Division I Indoor Track and Field Championships.

== Achievements ==
| Year | Competition | Venue | Position | Event | Notes |
Representing Finland
| 1994 | European Championships | Helsinki, Finland | 38th | Marathon | 2:51.23 |
